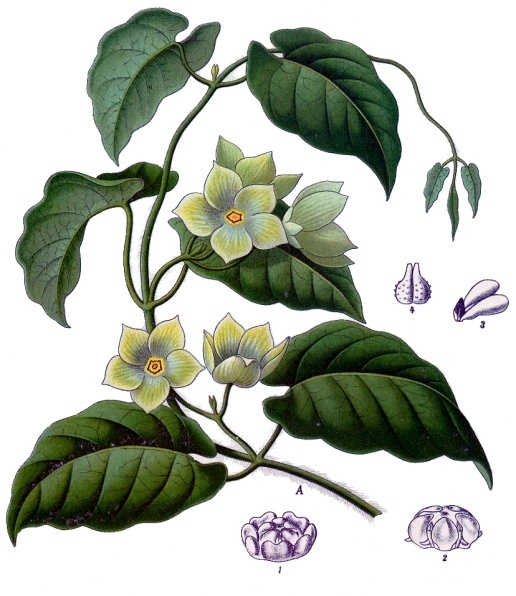
- Matelea denticulata

Scientific classification
- Kingdom: Plantae
- Clade: Embryophytes
- Clade: Tracheophytes
- Clade: Angiosperms
- Clade: Eudicots
- Clade: Asterids
- Order: Gentianales
- Family: Apocynaceae
- Subfamily: Asclepiadoideae; Burnett

Genera
- See text

= Asclepiadoideae =

Subfamily of plants

The Asclepiadoideae are a subfamily of flowering plants in the family Apocynaceae. Formerly, these plants together with those now in the Apocynaceae subfamilies Periplocoideae and Secamonoideae were treated as a separate family under the name Asclepiadaceae, e.g. by APG II, and known as the milkweed family.

They form a group of perennial herbs, twining shrubs, lianas or rarely trees but notably also contain a significant number of leafless stem succulents. The name comes from the type genus Asclepias (milkweeds).

There are 348 genera, with about 2,900 species. They are mainly located in the tropics to subtropics, especially in Africa and South America.

The florally-advanced tribe Stapelieae within this family contains several relatively familiar stem succulent genera, such as Orbea, Huernia, Stapelia and Hoodia. They are remarkable for the complex mechanisms which they have developed for pollination, independently parallel to the unrelated Orchidaceae, such as the grouping of their pollen into pollinia. The "fragrance" (or odor) of the flowers, often called "carrion flowers", attracts flies, the chief pollinators for these plants. Additionally, the color, appearance and texture of the flowers often is thought to resemble decaying flesh or raw meat to further entice pollination by flies.

Many new hybrids have been formed due to the unique fertilization method of the flowers.

== Taxonomy ==
Gilbert Thomas Burnett in 1835 is considered to be the first botanist to recognize a primary division of the family Apocynaceae using the name Asclepiadeae, an ending now used for tribes rather than subfamilies. In 2014, Endress, Liede-Schumann and Meve recognised five tribes within the subfamily. A molecular phylogenetic study in 2019 confirmed the distinctness of the five tribes, which were related as shown in the following cladogram:

- Asclepiadoideae
  - Fockeeae
  - - Asclepiadeae
    - - Eustegieae
      - - Ceropegieae
        - Marsdenieae

=== Tribes and genera ===
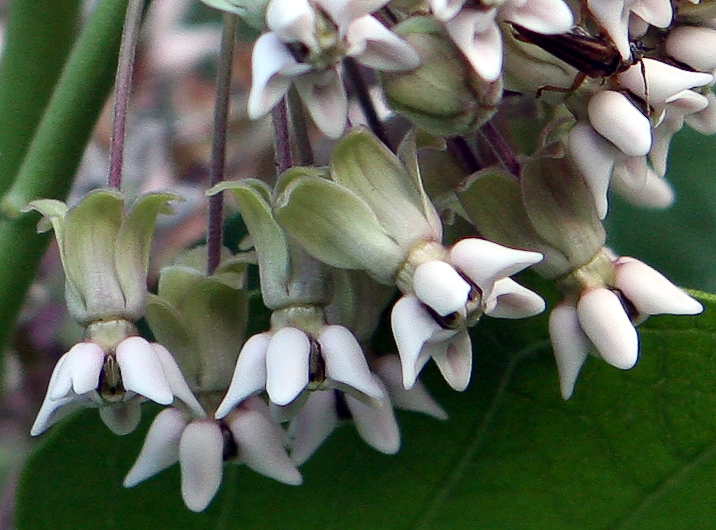
Asclepias syriaca

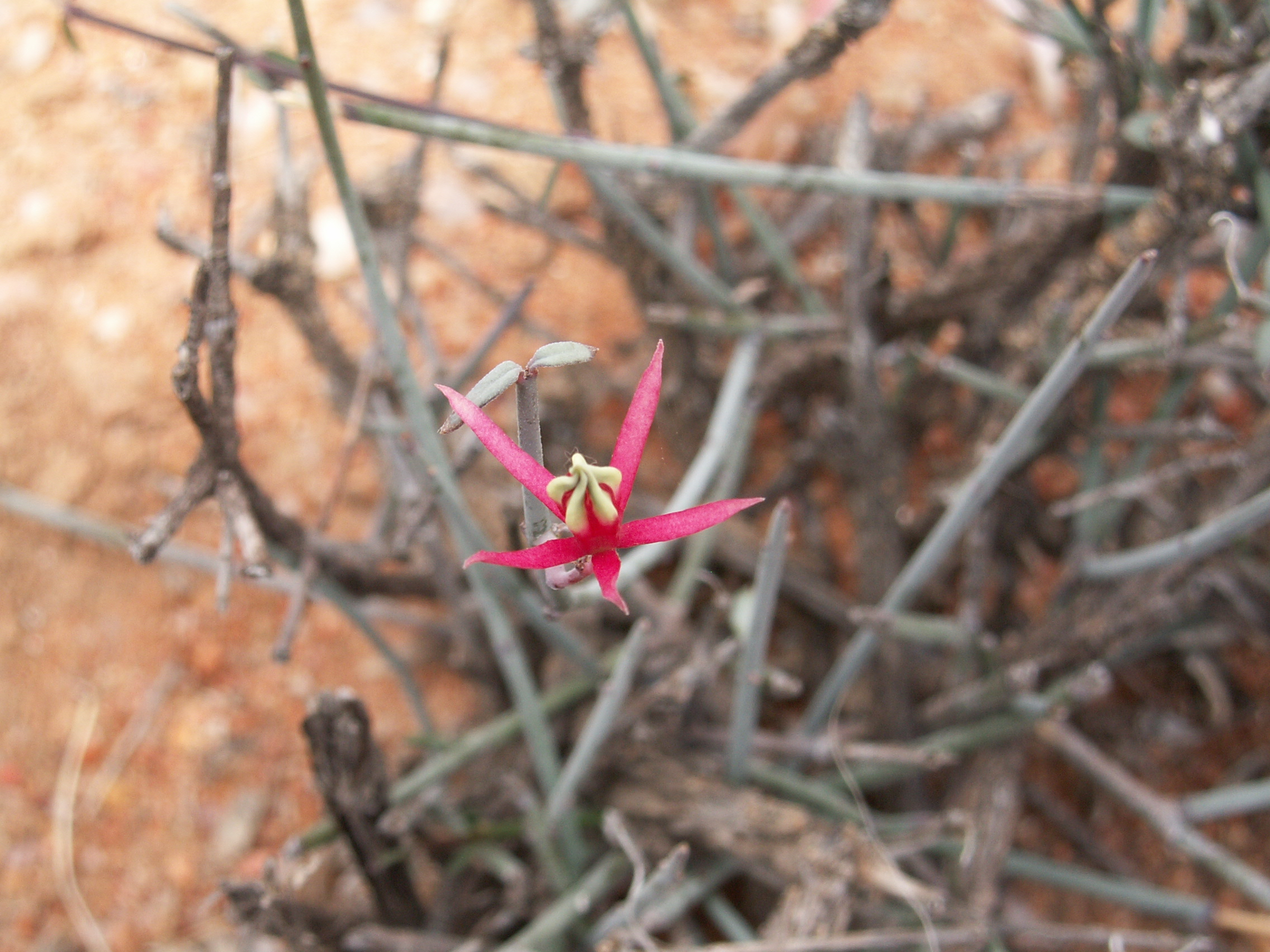
Microloma calycinum, Richtersveld, South Africa

The assignment of genera to tribes is based on Endress, Liede-Schumann and Meve (2014), with synonyms from Plants of the World Online as of December 2023. A full revision of the section Marsdenieae was published by Liede-Schumann et al in 2022 and those additional genera have that citation.

==== Asclepiadeae ====
- Araujia Brot.
- Asclepias L., including Aidomene Stopp, Odontostelma Rendle, Trachycalymma (K.Schum.)
- Aspidoglossum E.Mey.
- Aspidonepsis Nicholas
- Astephanus R.Br.
- Barjonia Decne.
- Blepharodon Decne.
- Calciphila Liede
- Calotropis R.Br.
- Cordylogyne E.Mey.
- Cynanchum L., including Adelostemma Hook.f., Glossonema Decne., Metaplexis R.Br., Pentarrhinum E.Mey., Seshagiria Ansari, Sichuania M.G.Gilbert
- Diplolepis R.Br.
- Ditassa R.Br.
- Fanninia Harv.
- Fischeria DC.
- Funastrum E.Fourn.
- Glossostelma Schltr.
- Gomphocarpus R.Br.
- Gonolobus Michx.
- Graphistemma (Champ.
- Gyrostelma E.Fourn.
- Hemipogon Decne.
- Holostemma R.Br.
- Hypolobus E.Fourn.
- Ibatia Decne.
- Jobinia E.Fourn.
- Kanahia R.Br.
- Lachnostoma Kunth
- Macroscepis Kunth
- Mahawoa Schltr.
- Margaretta Oliv.
- Matelea Aubl.
- Metastelma R.Br.
- Microloma R.Br.
- Minaria T.U.P.Konno
- Miraglossum Kupicha
- Monsanima Liede
- Morrenia Lindl.
- Nautonia Decne.
- Nephradenia Decne.
- Odontanthera Wight
- Oncinema Arn.
- Orthosia Decne.
- Oxypetalum R.Br.
- Oxystelma R.Br.
- Pachycarpus E.Mey.
- Parapodium E.Mey.
- Pentacyphus Schltr., including Tetraphysa Schltr.
- Pentastelma Tsiang
- Pentatropis R.Br.
- Peplonia Decne.
- Pergularia L.
- Petalostelma E.Fourn.
- Phaeostemma E.Fourn.
- Pherotrichis Decne.
- Philibertia Kunth, including Mitostigma Decne.
- Pseudolachnostoma Morillo
- Raphistemma Wall.
- Rhyssostelma Decne.
- Rhytidostemma Morillo
- Rojasia Malme
- Schizoglossum E.Mey.
- Schizostephanus Hochst.
- Schubertia Mart.
- Scyphostelma Baill.
- Solenostemma Hayne
- Stathmostelma K.Schum.
- Stelmagonum Baill.
- Stenostelma Schltr.
- Tassadia Decne., including Stenomeria Turcz.
- Tweedia Hook.
- Tylodontia Griseb.
- Vincetoxicum Wolf, including Merrillanthus Chun, Oncostemma K.Schum., Rhyncharrhena F.Muell.
- Widgrenia Malme
- Woodia Schltr.
- Xysmalobium R.Br.

==== Ceropegieae ====
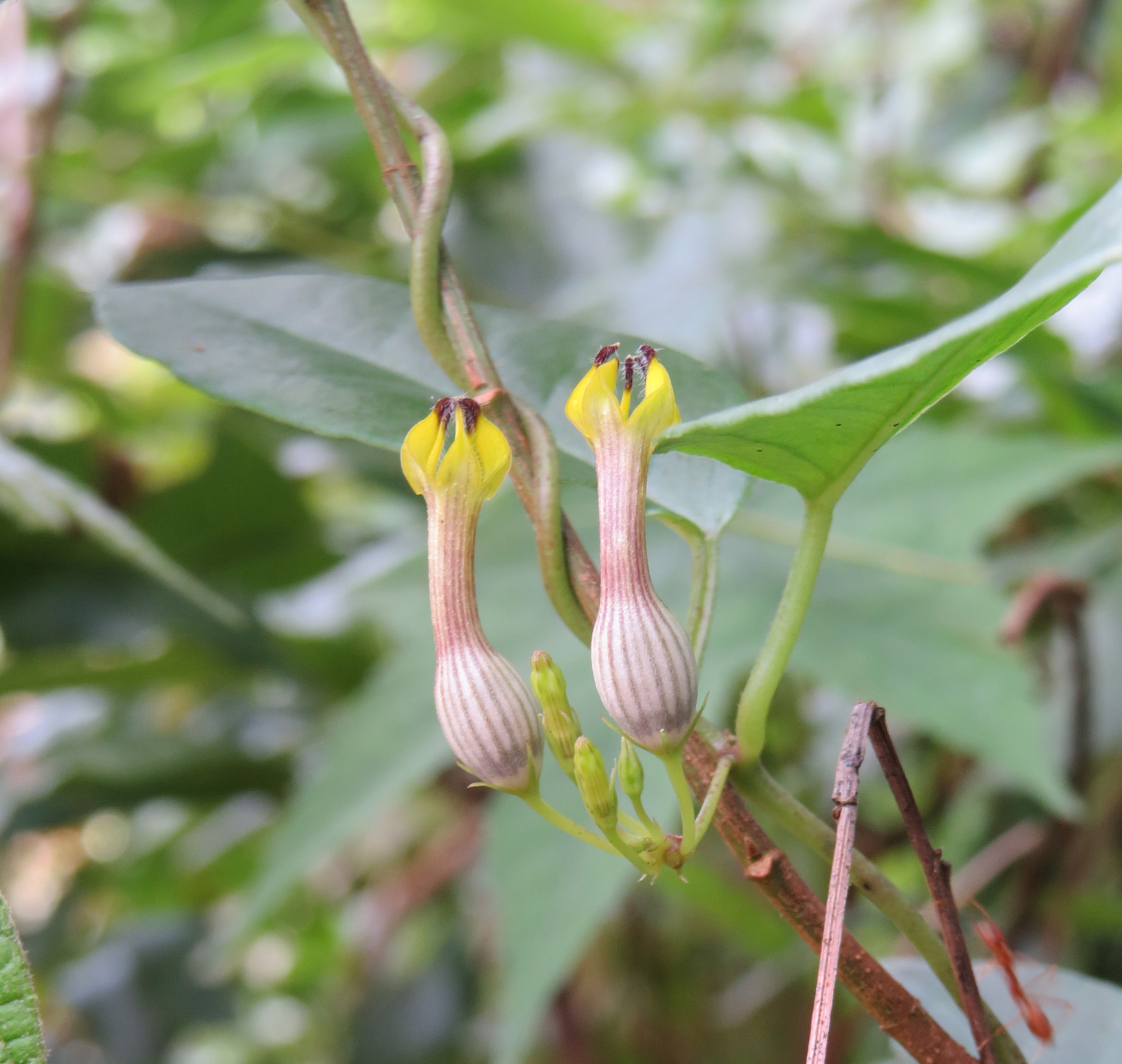
Ceropegia candelabrum

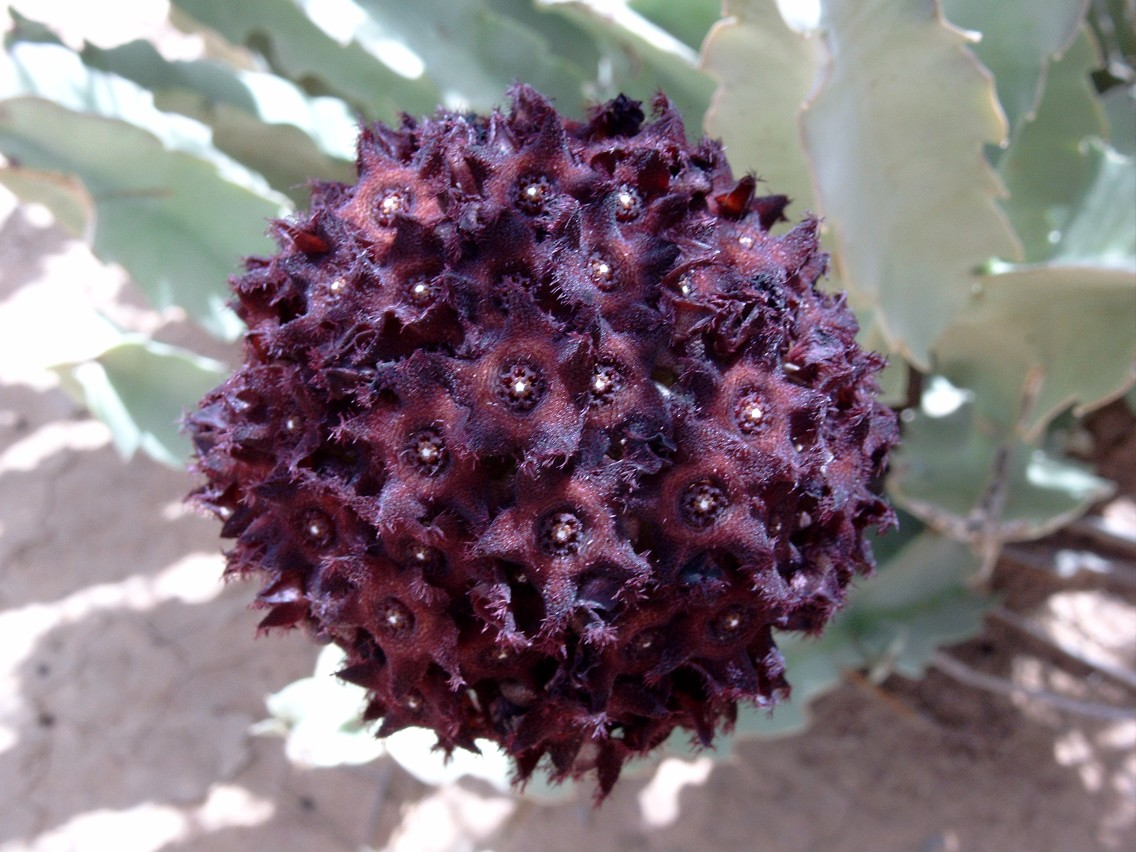
Caralluma acutangula, Burkina Faso

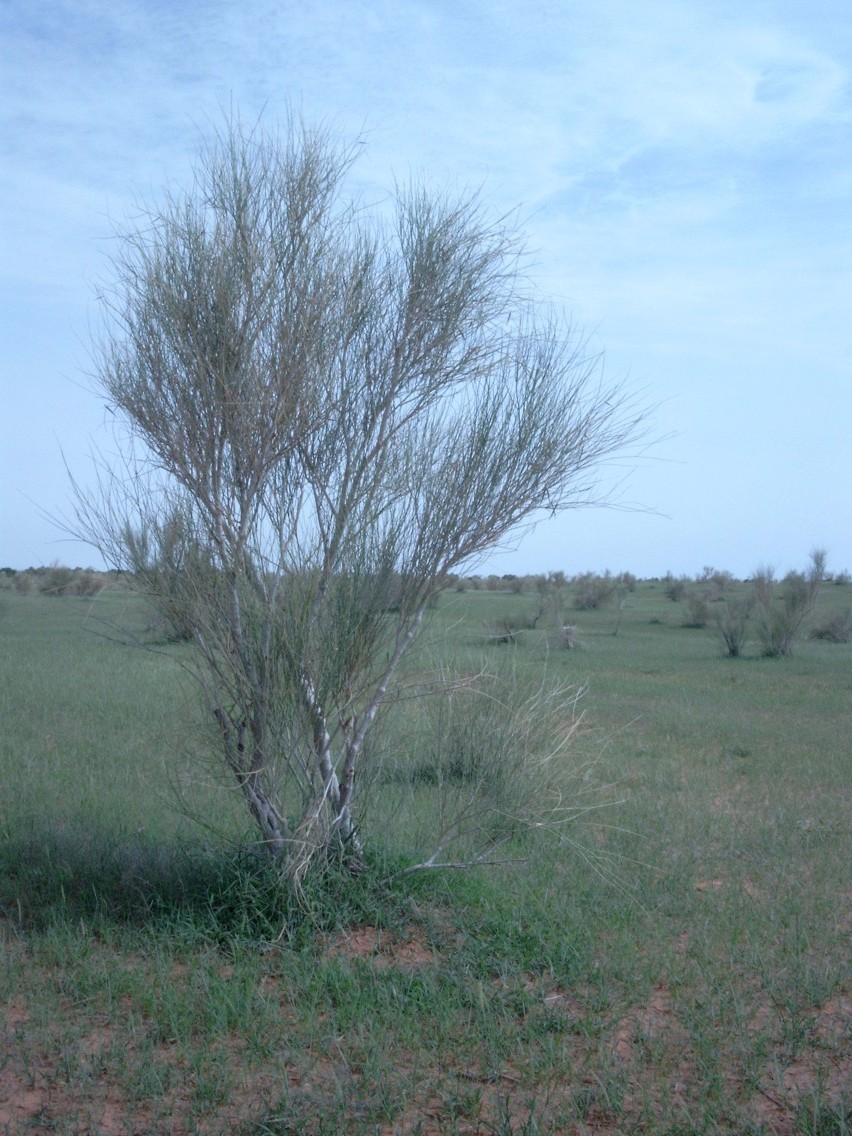
Leptadenia pyrotechnica, Burkina Faso

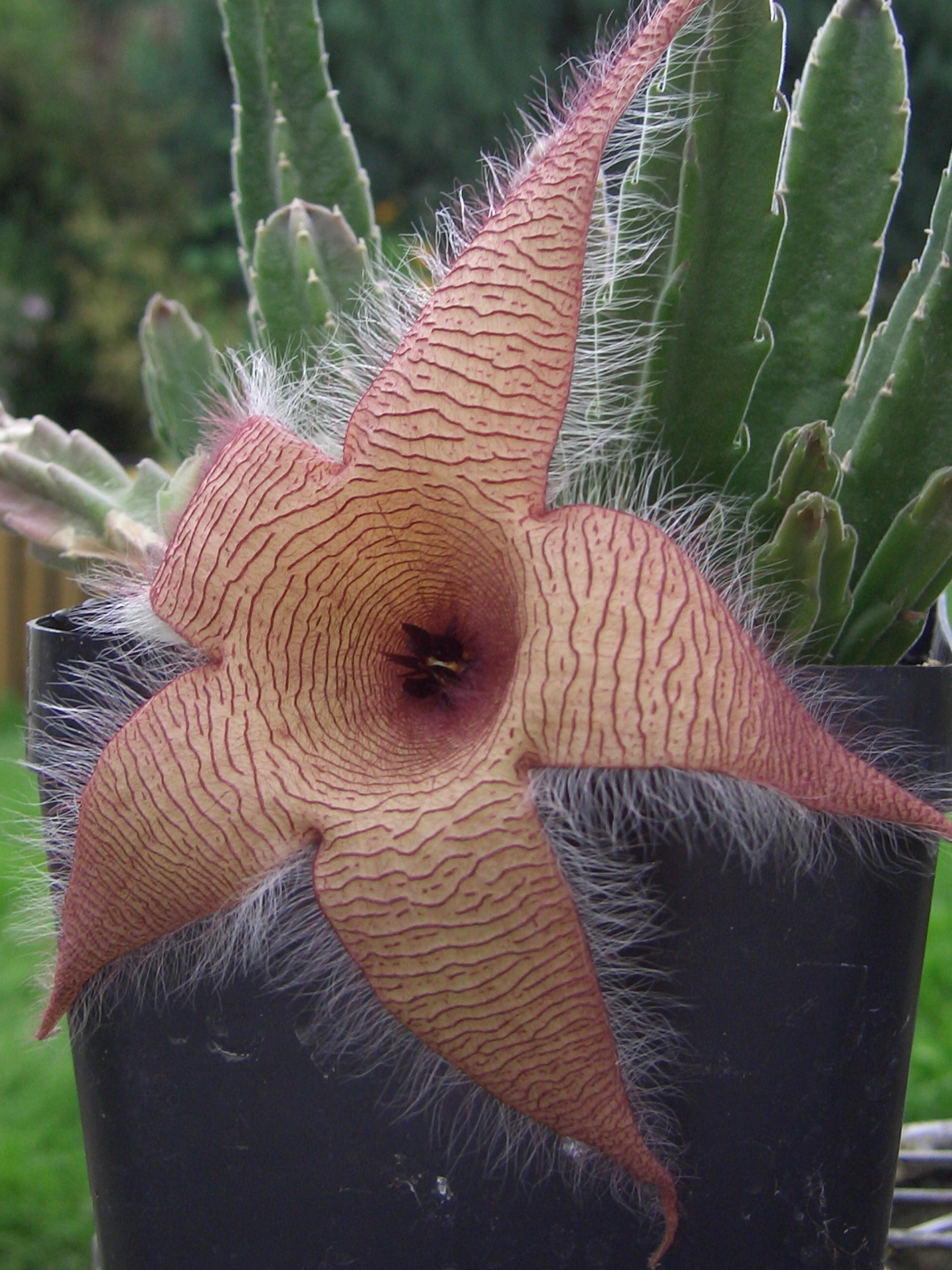
Stapelia gigantea

- Anisotoma Fenzl
- Apteranthes J.C.Mikan
- Australluma Plowes
- Baynesia Bruyns
- Boucerosia Wight
- Brachystelma Sims
- Caralluma R.Br.
- Caudanthera Plowes
- Ceropegia L.
- Conomitra Fenzl
- Desmidorchis Ehrenb.
- Duvalia Haw.
- Duvaliandra M.G.Gilbert
- Echidnopsis Hook.f.
- Edithcolea N.E.Br.
- Emplectanthus N.E.Br.
- Heterostemma Wight
- Hoodia Sweet
- Huernia R.Br.
- Larryleachia Plowes
- Lavrania Plowes
- Leptadenia R.Br.
- Monolluma Plowes
- Neoschumannia Schltr.
- Notechidnopsis Lavranos
- Ophionella Bruyns
- Orbea Haw., including Orbeanthus L.C.Leach
- Orthanthera Wight
- Pectinaria Haw.
- Pentasacme Wall.
- Piaranthus R.Br.
- Pseudolithos P.R.O.Bally, including Anomalluma Plowes
- Quaqua N.E.Br.
- Rhytidocaulon P.R.O.Bally
- Richtersveldia Meve
- Riocreuxia Decne.
- Sisyranthus E.Mey.
- Socotrella Bruyns
- Stapelia L.
- Stapelianthus Choux
- Stapeliopsis Pillans
- Tavaresia Welw.
- Tridentea Haw.
- Tromotriche Haw.
- Whitesloanea Chiov.

==== Eustegieae ====
- Emicocarpus R.Br.
- Eustegia K.Schum. & Schltr.

==== Fockeeae ====
- Cibirhiza Bruyns
- Fockea Endl.

==== Marsdenieae ====
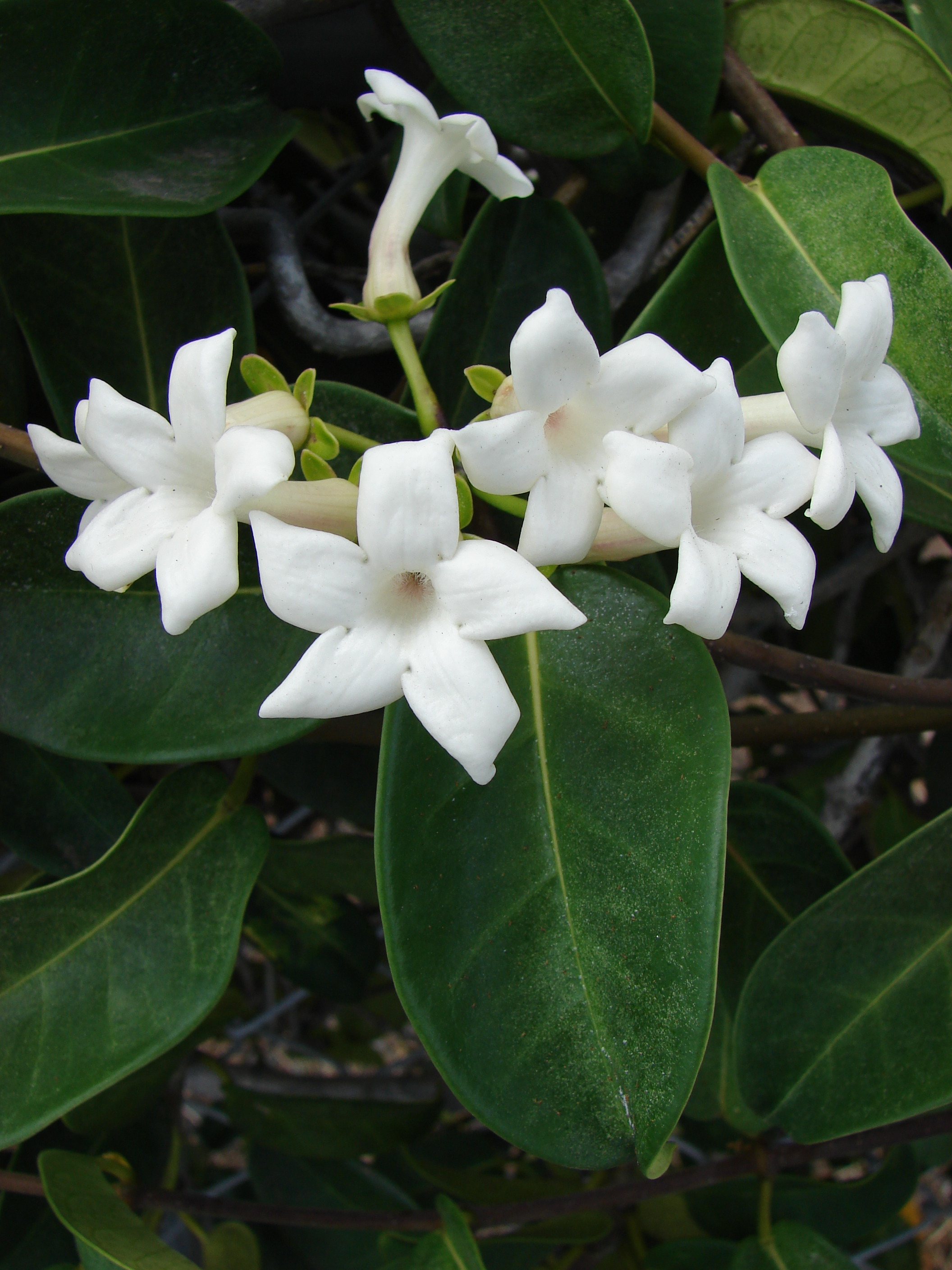
Stephanotis floribunda

- Anatropanthus Schltr.
- Anisopus N.E.Br.
- Asterostemma Decne.
- Campestigma Pierre
- Cionura Griseb.
- Cosmostigma Wight
- Dischidanthus Tsiang
- Dischidia R.Br.
- Dolichopetalum Tsiang
- Gongreos Rodda, Liede & Meve
- Gongronema (Endl.) Decne.
- Gongronemopsis S.Reuss, Liede & Meve
- Gunnessia P.I.Forst.
- Gymnema R.Br.
- Harmandiella Costantin
- Heynella Backer
- Hoya R.Br., including Cathetostemma Blume, Clemensiella Schltr.
- Jasminanthes Blume
- Leichhardtia R.Br.
- Lygisma Hook.f.
- Marsdenia R.Br.
- Oreosparte Schltr.
- Papuahoya Rodda & Simonsson
- Pycnorhachis Benth.
- Rhyssolobium E.Mey.
- Ruehssia H.Karst. ex Schltdl.
- Sarcolobus R.Br., including Quisumbingia Merr.
- Sicyocarpus Bojer
- Stephanotis Thouars, including Dregea E.Mey., Wattakaka Hassk.
- Stigmatorhynchus Schltr.
- Telosma Coville
- Treutlera Hook.f.

==== Other genera ====
These genera are not accepted within Asclepiadoideae by Endress et al. (2014), but are accepted by Plants of the World Online. Tribal placements below are from GRIN-Global, where given.

- Dalzielia Turrill - no molecular evidence but kept separate from Marsdenia in Marsdenieae.
- Decanema Decne. – Asclepiadeae (possible synonym of Cynanchum)
- Gymnemopsis Costantin - no molecular evidence but kept separate from Pseudosarcolobus and Harmandiella in Marsdenieae.
- Kerbera E.Fourn. – Asclepiadeae
- Periglossum Decne. – Asclepiadeae
- Polystemma Decne., including Microdactylon – Asclepiadeae (possible synonym of Matelea)
- Ptycanthera Decne. – Asclepiadeae (possible synonym of Matelea)
- Schistonema Schltr. – Asclepiadeae (possible synonym of Tweedia)
- Vailia Rusby – Asclepiadeae (possible synonym of Blepharodon)
