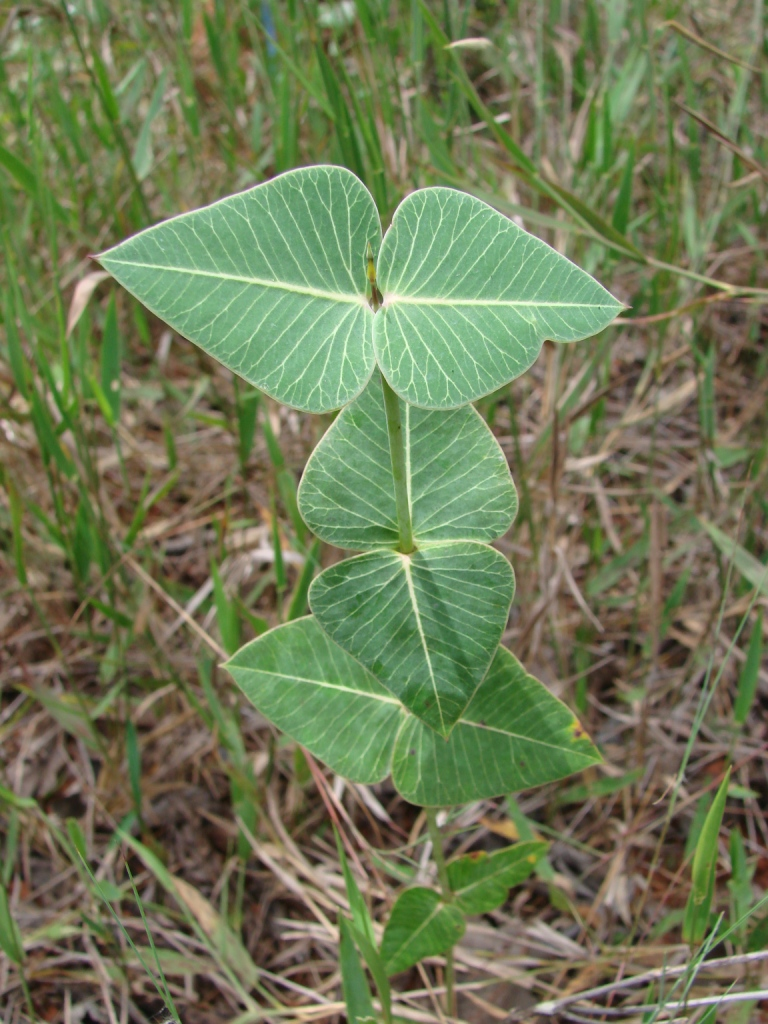
- Barjonia cymosa

Scientific classification
- Kingdom: Plantae
- Clade: Embryophytes
- Clade: Tracheophytes
- Clade: Spermatophytes
- Clade: Angiosperms
- Clade: Eudicots
- Clade: Asterids
- Order: Gentianales
- Family: Apocynaceae
- Subfamily: Asclepiadoideae
- Tribe: Asclepiadeae
- Genus: Barjonia; Decne.

= Barjonia =

Genus of Brazilian flowering plants

Barjonia is a genus of flowering plants in the family Apocynaceae, first described as a genus in 1844. They are native to South America.

Species

1. Barjonia chlorifolia Decne. - Brazil, Bolivia
2. Barjonia cymosa E.Fourn. - Brazil
3. Barjonia erecta (Vell.) K.Schum. - Goiás, Mato Grosso
4. Barjonia glazioui Marquete - Goiás, Distrito Federal
5. Barjonia grazielae Marquete - Goiás, Distrito Federal
6. Barjonia harleyi Fontella & Marquete - Bahia
7. Barjonia laxa Malme - Brazil, Bolivia

formerly included

transferred to Hemipogon, Minaria

1. B. acerosa now Hemipogon hemipogonoides
2. B. ditassoides now Minaria ditassoides
3. B. parva now Minaria parva
