= Anatropanthus =

Scientific classification
- Kingdom: Plantae
- Clade: Tracheophytes
- Clade: Angiosperms
- Clade: Eudicots
- Clade: Asterids
- Order: Gentianales
- Family: Apocynaceae
- Subfamily: Asclepiadoideae
- Tribe: Marsdenieae
- Genus: Anatropanthus; Schltr.
- Species: A. borneensis

Binomial name
- Anatropanthus borneensis Schltr.

Genus of plants

Anatropanthus is a species of plants in the family Apocynaceae first described as a genus in 1908. It contains only one known species, Anatropanthus borneensis , endemic to the Island of Borneo. This species has been subsumed into genus Hoya as of 2020 under the name Hoya insularis.
