= Hemipogon =

Hemipogon is the scientific name of two genera of organisms and may refer to:

- Hemipogon (moth), a genus of moths in the family Geometridae, now considered synonymous with the genus Idaea
- Hemipogon (plant), a genus of plants in the family Apocynaceae
