= Harmandiella =

Scientific classification
- Kingdom: Plantae
- Clade: Tracheophytes
- Clade: Angiosperms
- Clade: Eudicots
- Clade: Asterids
- Order: Gentianales
- Family: Apocynaceae
- Genus: Harmandiella; Costantin (1912)
- Species: H. cordifolia

Binomial name
- Harmandiella cordifolia Costantin (1912)

Synonyms
- Marsdenia harmandiella Omlor (1998)

Genus of flowering plants

Harmandiella cordifolia is a species of flowering plant in the dogbane family, Apocynaceae, subfamily Asclepiadoideae, tribe Marsdenieae. It is the sole species in genus Harmandiella. It is a climber native to Thailand, Laos, and Vietnam.
