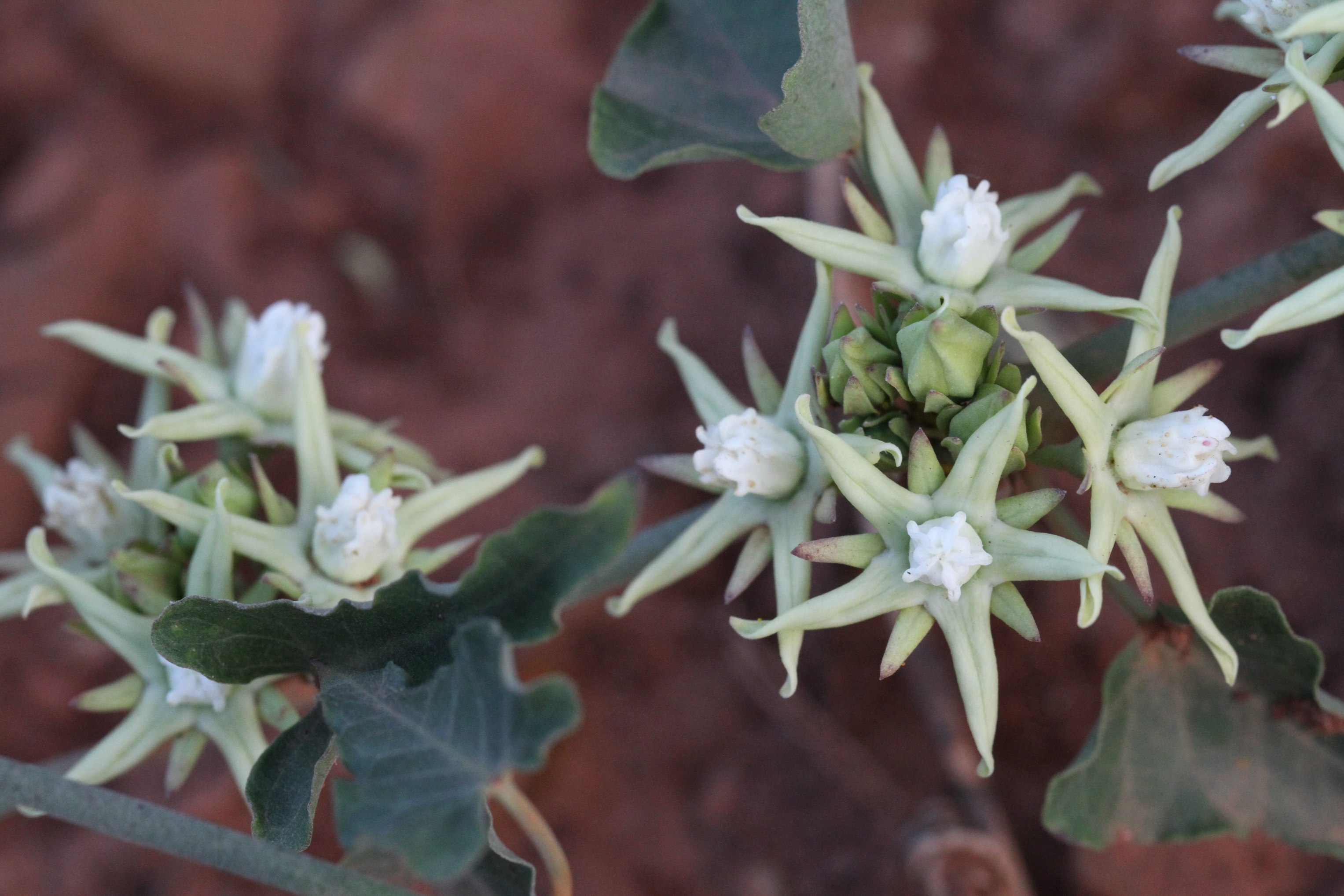
- Morrenia odorata

Scientific classification
- Kingdom: Plantae
- Clade: Embryophytes
- Clade: Tracheophytes
- Clade: Spermatophytes
- Clade: Angiosperms
- Clade: Eudicots
- Clade: Asterids
- Order: Gentianales
- Family: Apocynaceae
- Subfamily: Asclepiadoideae
- Tribe: Asclepiadeae
- Genus: Morrenia; Lindl.

Type species
- Morrenia odorata Lindl. 1838 not Hort. ex Kunze 1847

= Morrenia =

Genus of flowering neotropical plants

Morrenia is a genus of flowering plants in the family Apocynaceae, first described as a genus in 1838. It is native to South America.

Species

1. Morrenia brachystephana Griseb. - N Argentina
2. Morrenia hassleriana Malme - Gran Chaco in Paraguay
3. Morrenia herzogii Schltr. - Trockenwald in Bolivia
4. Morrenia intermedia T. Mey. - Argentina
5. Morrenia odorata (Hook. & Arn.) Lindl. - Brazil, Bolivia, Argentina, Paraguay, Uruguay
6. Morrenia scalae (Hicken) Goyder - Río Negro in Argentina
7. Morrenia stormiana (Morong) Malme - Brazil, Bolivia
8. Morrenia stuckertiana (Kurtz ex Heger) Malme - N Argentina
9. Morrenia variegata (Griseb.) T. Mey. - N Argentina

homonym

Morrenia odorata Hort. ex D.G. Kuntze not (Hook. & Arn.) Lindl. now Mikania glomerata
