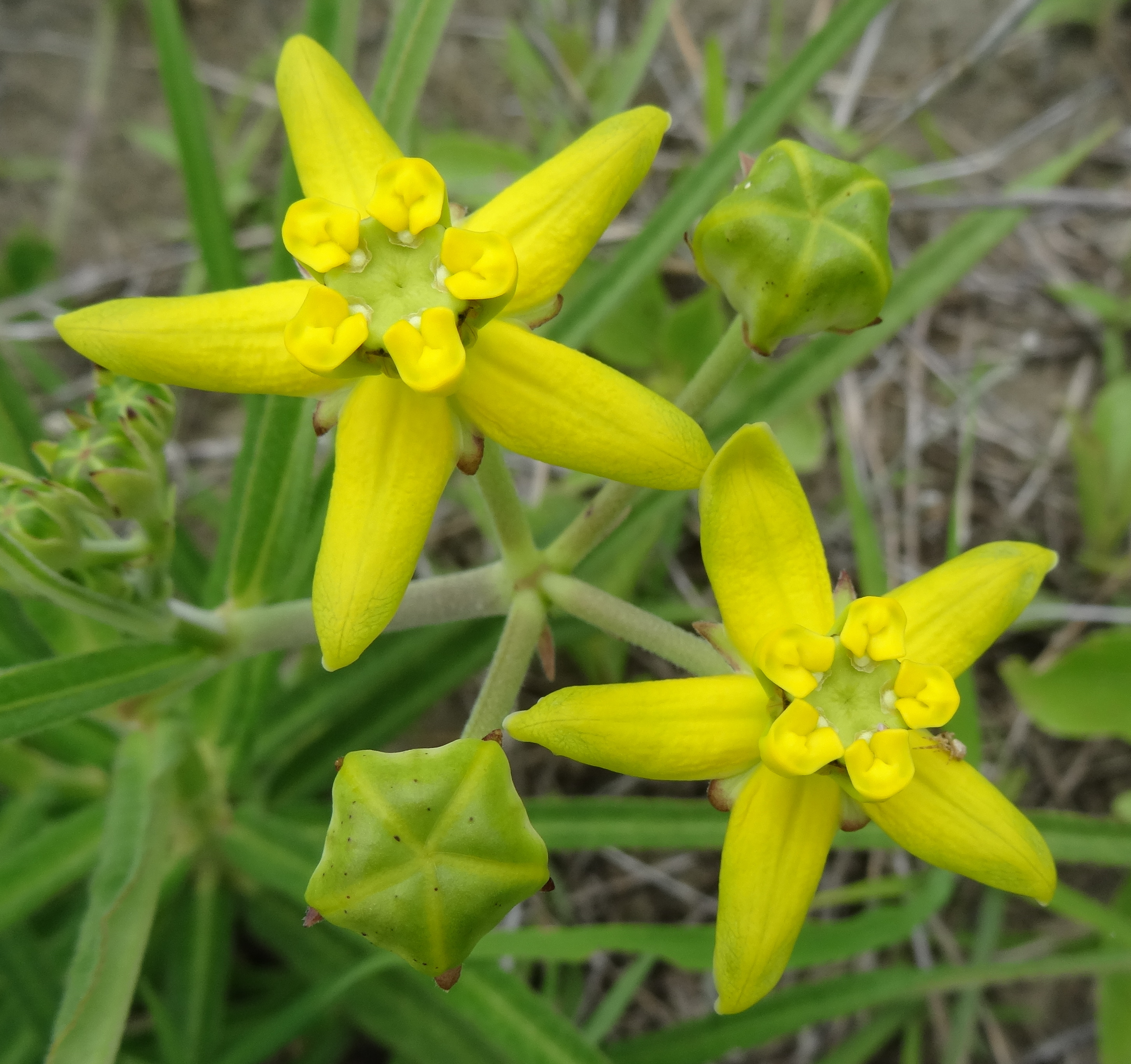
- Stathmostelma fornicatum

Scientific classification
- Kingdom: Plantae
- Clade: Tracheophytes
- Clade: Angiosperms
- Clade: Eudicots
- Clade: Asterids
- Order: Gentianales
- Family: Apocynaceae
- Subfamily: Asclepiadoideae
- Tribe: Asclepiadeae
- Genus: Stathmostelma; Schltr.

= Stathmostelma =

Genus of plants

Stathmostelma is a genus of plants in the family Apocynaceae, first described as a genus in 1893. It is native to 15 African countries starting in Cameroon to Ethiopia and Botswana.

Species

1. Stathmostelma angustatum K.Schum. - Ethiopia
2. Stathmostelma fornicatum (N.E.Br.) Bullock - Malawi
3. Stathmostelma gigantiflorum K. Schum. - Tanzania
4. Stathmostelma incarnatum K.Schum. - Angola, S Zaire
5. Stathmostelma nomadacridum Bullock - Tanzania
6. Stathmostelma pauciflorum K.Schum. - Mozambique
7. Stathmostelma propinquum (N.E.Br.) Schltr. - E Africa
8. Stathmostelma rhacodes K.Schum. - E Africa
9. Stathmostelma spectabile (N.E.Br.) Schltr. - E Africa
10. Stathmostelma welwitschii Britten & Rendle - Angola
11. Stathmostelma wildemanianum T.Durand & H.Durand - C Africa
12. Stathmostelma diversifolium Goyder - S. Ethiopia to N. Tanzania
13. Stathmostelma gigantiflorum K.Schum - Kenya to E. Zambia

formerly included

1. S. crassinerve, syn of Asclepias crassinervis
2. S. nuttii, syn of Asclepias nuttii
3. S. pedunculatum, syn of Asclepias aurea
4. S. verdickii, syn of Asclepias stathmostelmoides
