= Emplectanthus =

Scientific classification
- Kingdom: Plantae
- Clade: Tracheophytes
- Clade: Angiosperms
- Clade: Eudicots
- Clade: Asterids
- Order: Gentianales
- Family: Apocynaceae
- Subfamily: Asclepiadoideae
- Tribe: Ceropegieae
- Genus: Emplectanthus; N.E.Br.

Genus of plants

Emplectanthus is a genus of flowering plants belonging to the family Apocynaceae.

Its native range is Southern Africa.

Species:

- Emplectanthus cordatus N.E.Br.
- Emplectanthus dalzellii D.G.A.Styles
- Emplectanthus gerrardii N.E.Br.
