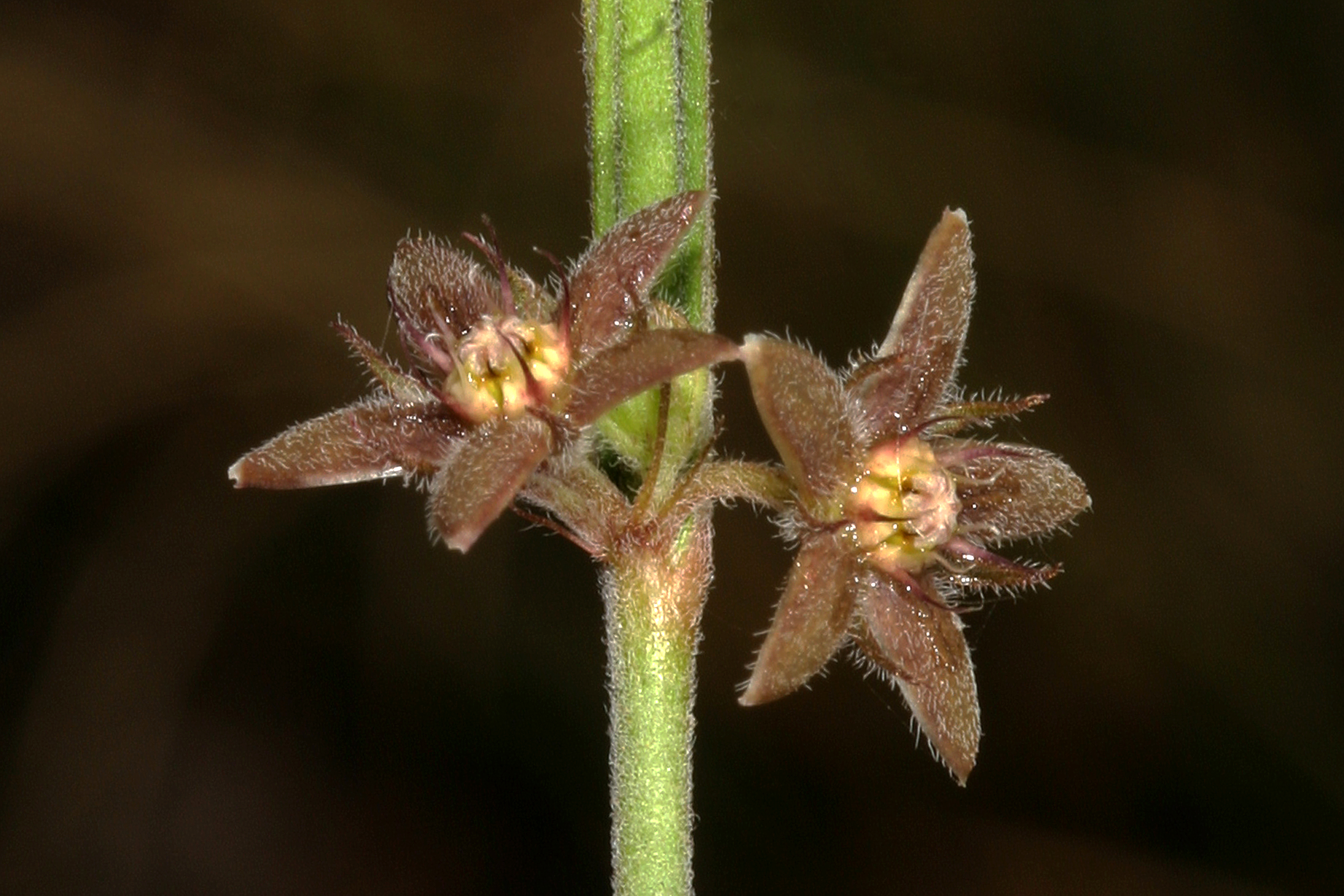
- Aspidoglossum biflorum flower

Scientific classification
- Kingdom: Plantae
- Clade: Embryophytes
- Clade: Tracheophytes
- Clade: Spermatophytes
- Clade: Angiosperms
- Clade: Eudicots
- Clade: Asterids
- Order: Gentianales
- Family: Apocynaceae
- Subfamily: Asclepiadoideae
- Tribe: Asclepiadeae
- Genus: Aspidoglossum; E.Mey.

Synonyms
- Rhinolobium Arn.

= Aspidoglossum =

Genus of African plants

Aspidoglossum is a genus of plants in the family Apocynaceae, first described as a genus in 1838. It is native to Africa.

Accepted species

1. Aspidoglossum angustissimum (K.Schum.) Bullock - tropical Africa
2. Aspidoglossum araneiferum (Schltr.) Kupicha - KwaZulu-Natal
3. Aspidoglossum biflorum E.Mey. - Eastern Cape Province
4. Aspidoglossum breve Kupicha - Malawi, Tanzania
5. Aspidoglossum carinatum (Schltr.) Kupicha - South Africa
6. Aspidoglossum connatum (N.E.Br.) Bullock - tropical Africa
7. Aspidoglossum crebrum Kupicha - Zimbabwe
8. Aspidoglossum delagoense (Schltr.) Kupicha - Mozambique
9. Aspidoglossum demissum Kupicha - KwaZulu-Natal
10. Aspidoglossum difficile Hilliard - KwaZulu-Natal
11. Aspidoglossum dissimile (N.E.Br.) Kupicha - South Africa
12. Aspidoglossum elliotii (Schltr.) Kupicha - East Africa
13. Aspidoglossum erubescens (Schltr.) Bullock - East Africa
14. Aspidoglossum eylesii (S.Moore) Kupicha - Zimbabwe, Zambia
15. Aspidoglossum fasciculare E.Mey. - Eastern Cape Province
16. Aspidoglossum flanaganii (Schltr.) Kupicha - South Africa
17. Aspidoglossum glabellum Kupicha - Zimbabwe
18. Aspidoglossum glabrescens (Schltr.) Kupicha - Mpumalanga
19. Aspidoglossum glanduliferum (Schltr.) Kupicha - Pondoland in Eastern Cape Province
20. Aspidoglossum gracile (E.Mey.) Kupicha - Western Cape Province
21. Aspidoglossum grandiflorum (Schltr.) Kupicha - Eastern Cape Province
22. Aspidoglossum heterophyllum E.Mey. - Western Cape Province
23. Aspidoglossum hirundo Kupicho - Mozambique
24. Aspidoglossum interruptum (E.Mey.) Bullock - Mozambique, South Africa
25. Aspidoglossum lamellatum (Schltr.) Kupicha - False Bay in South Africa
26. Aspidoglossum lanatum (Weim.) Kupicha - Zimbabwe
27. Aspidoglossum masaicum (N.E.Br.) Kupicha - East Africa
28. Aspidoglossum nyassae (Britten & Rendle) Kupicha - Malawi
29. Aspidoglossum ovalifolium (Schltr.) Kupicha - Eastern Cape Province
30. Aspidoglossum restioides (Schltr.) Kupicha - Western Cape Province
31. Aspidoglossum rhodesicum (Weim.) Kupicha - Zimbabwe
32. Aspidoglossum uncinatum (N.E.Br.) Kupicha - Western Cape Province
33. Aspidoglossum validum Kupicho - Mpumalanga, Limpopo
34. Aspidoglossum virgatum (E.Mey.) Kupicha - South Africa
35. Aspidoglossum woodii (Schltr.) Kupicha - KwaZulu-Natal
36. Aspidoglossum xanthosphaerum Hilliard - KwaZulu-Natal
