= Decanema =

Scientific classification
- Kingdom: Plantae
- Clade: Tracheophytes
- Clade: Angiosperms
- Clade: Eudicots
- Clade: Asterids
- Order: Gentianales
- Family: Apocynaceae
- Subfamily: Asclepiadoideae
- Tribe: Asclepiadeae
- Genus: Decanema; Decne.

Genus of plants

Decanema is a small genus in the dogbane family first described as a genus in 1838. The group is endemic to Madagascar.

Species

1. Decanema bojerianum Decne. - Madagascar
2. Decanema luteifluens Jum. & H.Perrier - Madagascar

formerly included

- Decanema grandiflorum Jum. & H.Perrier, synonym of Cynanchum grandidieri Liede & Meve.
