= Pentacyphus =

Scientific classification
- Kingdom: Plantae
- Clade: Tracheophytes
- Clade: Angiosperms
- Clade: Eudicots
- Clade: Asterids
- Order: Gentianales
- Family: Apocynaceae
- Subfamily: Asclepiadoideae
- Tribe: Asclepiadeae
- Genus: Pentacyphus; Schltr.

Type species
- Pentacyphus boliviensis (syn. of P. andinus) Schltr.

Synonyms
- Tetraphysa Schltr.

Genus of plants

Pentacyphus is a genus of plants in the family Apocynaceae, first described as a genus in 1906. It is native to South America (Bolivia, Colombia, Ecuador, Peru and Venezuela).

== Species ==
As of November 2023, Plants of the World Online accepted three species:

- Pentacyphus andinus (Ball) Liede – Bolivia, Peru
- Pentacyphus camargoi (Morillo) Meve & Liede – Colombia
- Pentacyphus lehmannii (Schltr.) Liede – Colombia, Ecuador, Venezuela

Formerly included

Pentacyphus tamanus (Morillo) Liede, synonym of Pentacyphus lehmannii subsp. tamanus
