= Cibirhiza =

Scientific classification
- Kingdom: Plantae
- Clade: Tracheophytes
- Clade: Angiosperms
- Clade: Eudicots
- Clade: Asterids
- Order: Gentianales
- Family: Apocynaceae
- Subfamily: Asclepiadoideae
- Tribe: Fockeeae
- Genus: Cibirhiza; Bruyns

Genus of plants

Cibirhiza is a genus of plants in the family Apocynaceae, first described as a genus in 1988. It is native to central and eastern Africa and to the Arabian Peninsula.

== Species ==
1. Cibirhiza albersiana Kunz, Meve & Liede - Tanzania, Zambia
2. Cibirhiza dhofarensis P.Bruyns - Oman
3. Cibirhiza spiculata Thulin & Goyder - E Ethiopia
