= Phaeostemma =

Scientific classification
- Kingdom: Plantae
- Clade: Tracheophytes
- Clade: Angiosperms
- Clade: Eudicots
- Clade: Asterids
- Order: Gentianales
- Family: Apocynaceae
- Subfamily: Asclepiadoideae
- Tribe: Asclepiadeae
- Genus: Phaeostemma; E.Fourn.

Genus of plants

Phaeostemma is a genus of flowering plants belonging to the family Apocynaceae.

Its native range is Northern South America, Southeastern and Southern Brazil to Northeastern Argentina.

Species:

- Phaeostemma brasiliensis Morillo
- Phaeostemma fucata (Woodson) Morillo & Krings
- Phaeostemma glaziovii E.Fourn.
- Phaeostemma hatschbachii Morillo
- Phaeostemma kelleri Morillo
- Phaeostemma riedelii E.Fourn.
- Phaeostemma surinamensis Morillo & Krings
