= Eustegia =

Scientific classification
- Kingdom: Plantae
- Clade: Tracheophytes
- Clade: Angiosperms
- Clade: Eudicots
- Clade: Asterids
- Order: Gentianales
- Family: Apocynaceae
- Subfamily: Asclepiadoideae
- Tribe: Eustegieae
- Genus: Eustegia; R.Br. 1810 not Raf. 1838

Genus of flowering plants

Eustegia is a genus of vines in the family Apocynaceae, first described as a genus with this name in 1810. It includes five species native to the Cape Provinces of South Africa.

== Species ==
Five species are accepted.

1. Eustegia filiformis (L.f.) Schult.
2. Eustegia fraterna N.E.Br.
3. Eustegia macropetala Schltr.
4. Eustegia minuta (L.f.) N.E.Br.
5. Eustegia plicata Schinz
