= Calciphila =

Scientific classification
- Kingdom: Plantae
- Clade: Embryophytes
- Clade: Tracheophytes
- Clade: Spermatophytes
- Clade: Angiosperms
- Clade: Eudicots
- Clade: Asterids
- Order: Gentianales
- Family: Apocynaceae
- Subfamily: Asclepiadoideae
- Tribe: Asclepiadeae
- Genus: Calciphila; Liede & Meve

Genus of flowering plants from Somalia

Calciphila is a genus of flowering plants belonging to the family Apocynaceae.

Its native range is Somalia.

Species:

- Calciphila galgalensis (Liede) Liede & Meve
  - A climbing subshrub found mainly in dry biomes and deserts.
- Calciphila gillettii Liede & Meve
  - A subshrub that is found mainly in dry biomes and deserts.
