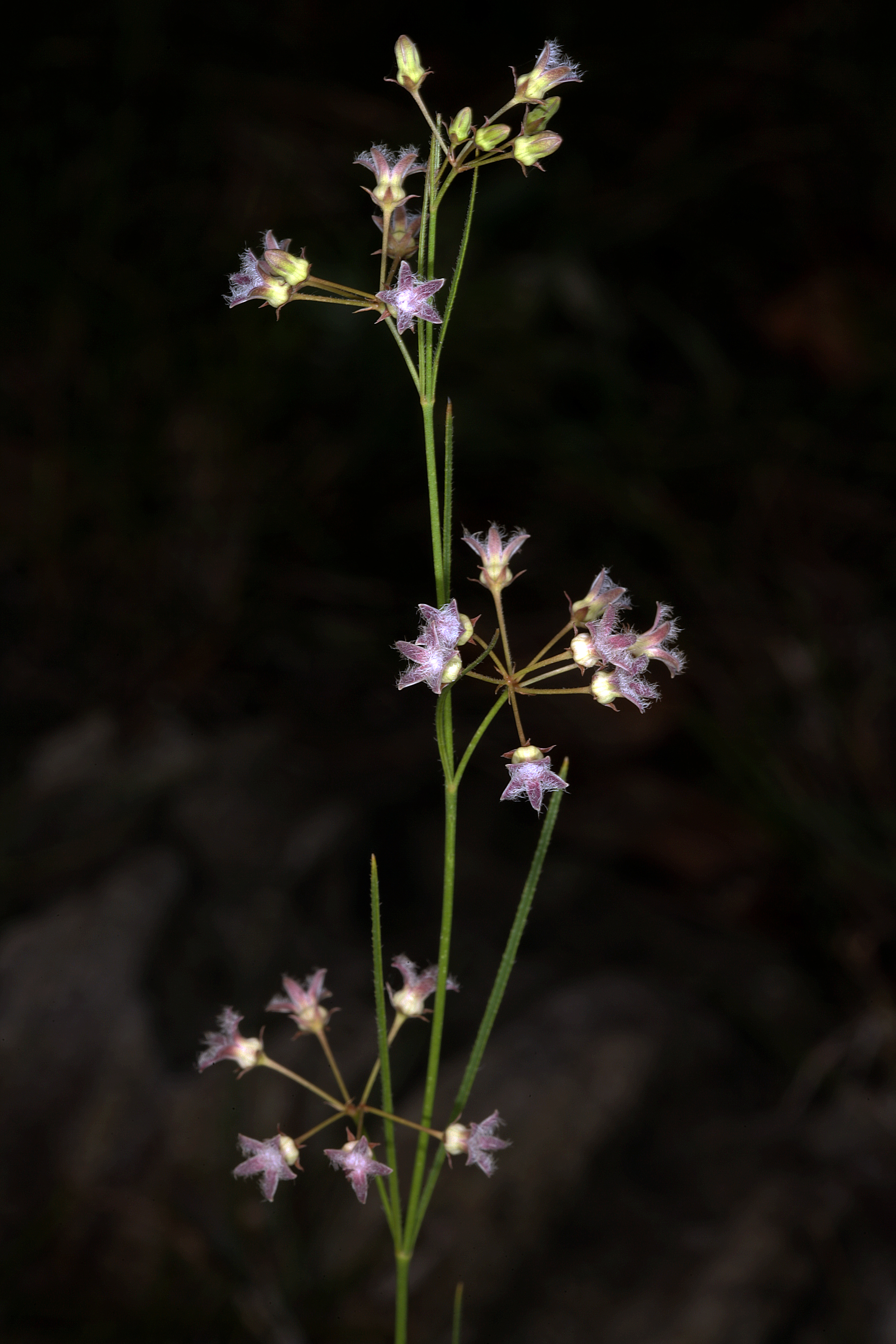
- Sisyranthus virgatus

Scientific classification
- Kingdom: Plantae
- Clade: Embryophytes
- Clade: Tracheophytes
- Clade: Spermatophytes
- Clade: Angiosperms
- Clade: Eudicots
- Clade: Asterids
- Order: Gentianales
- Family: Apocynaceae
- Subfamily: Asclepiadoideae
- Tribe: Ceropegieae
- Genus: Sisyranthus; E.Mey.

Type species
- Sisyranthus virgatus E.Mey.

= Sisyranthus =

Genus of plants

Sisyranthus is a group of plants in the family Apocynaceae first described as a genus in 1838. It is native to southern Africa.

Species

1. Sisyranthus anceps Schltr. - South Africa
2. Sisyranthus barbatus N.E.Br. - Eastern Cape Province
3. Sisyranthus compactus N.E.Br. - KwaZulu-Natal
4. Sisyranthus fanninii N.E.Br. - South Africa
5. Sisyranthus fimbriatus Schltr. - South Africa
6. Sisyranthus franksiae N.E.Br. - South Africa
7. Sisyranthus huttoniae S.Moore - South Africa
8. Sisyranthus imberbis Harv. - South Africa
9. Sisyranthus macer Schltr. - South Africa
10. Sisyranthus randii S.Moore - South Africa
11. Sisyranthus rhodesicus Weim. - Zimbabwe
12. Sisyranthus rotatus Schltr. - South Africa
13. Sisyranthus saundersiae N.E.Br. - KwaZulu-Natal
14. Sisyranthus schizoglossoides Schltr. - South Africa
15. Sisyranthus trichostomus K.Schum. - South Africa
16. Sisyranthus virgatus E.Mey. - South Africa
