= Aspidonepsis =

Scientific classification
- Kingdom: Plantae
- Clade: Embryophytes
- Clade: Tracheophytes
- Clade: Spermatophytes
- Clade: Angiosperms
- Clade: Eudicots
- Clade: Asterids
- Order: Gentianales
- Family: Apocynaceae
- Subfamily: Asclepiadoideae
- Tribe: Asclepiadeae
- Genus: Aspidonepsis; Nicholas & Goyder

Genus of African flowering plants

Aspidonepsis is a genus of flowering plants belonging to the family Apocynaceae.

Its native range is Southern Africa.

Species:

- Aspidonepsis cognata (N.E.Br.) Nicholas & Goyder
- Aspidonepsis diploglossa (Turcz.) Nicholas & Goyder
- Aspidonepsis flava (N.E.Br.) Nicholas & Goyder
- Aspidonepsis reenensis (N.E.Br.) Nicholas & Goyder
- Aspidonepsis shebae Nicholas & Goyder
