= Gyrostelma =

Scientific classification
- Kingdom: Plantae
- Clade: Tracheophytes
- Clade: Angiosperms
- Clade: Eudicots
- Clade: Asterids
- Order: Gentianales
- Family: Apocynaceae
- Subfamily: Asclepiadoideae
- Tribe: Asclepiadeae
- Genus: Gyrostelma; E.Fourn.
- Species: G. oxypetaloides

Binomial name
- Gyrostelma oxypetaloides E.Fourn.

Genus of plants

Gyrostelma is a monotypic genus of flowering plants belonging to the family Apocynaceae. The only species is Gyrostelma oxypetaloides.

Its native range is Central Brazil.
