= Ptycanthera =

Scientific classification
- Kingdom: Plantae
- Clade: Tracheophytes
- Clade: Angiosperms
- Clade: Eudicots
- Clade: Asterids
- Order: Gentianales
- Family: Apocynaceae
- Subfamily: Asclepiadoideae
- Tribe: Asclepiadeae
- Genus: Ptycanthera; Decne.

Genus of plants

Ptycanthera is a genus of flowering plants belonging to the family Apocynaceae.

Its native range is Cuba to Hispaniola.

Species:

- Ptycanthera oblongata (Griseb.) Schltr.
- Ptycanthera ovatifolia (Griseb.) Schltr.
