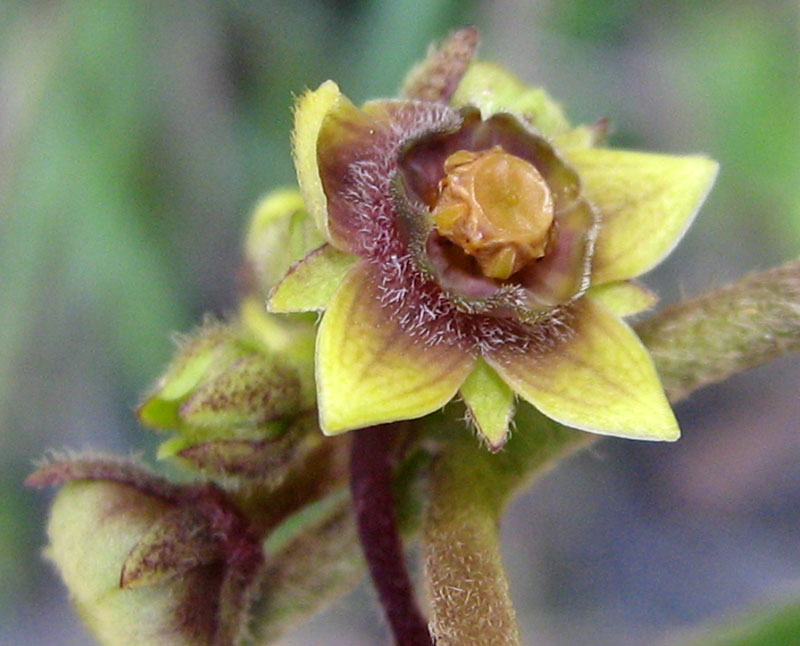
- Ibatia ganglinosa

Scientific classification
- Kingdom: Plantae
- Clade: Tracheophytes
- Clade: Angiosperms
- Clade: Eudicots
- Clade: Asterids
- Order: Gentianales
- Family: Apocynaceae
- Subfamily: Asclepiadoideae
- Tribe: Asclepiadeae
- Genus: Ibatia; Decne.

= Ibatia =

Genus of plants

Ibatia is a genus of flowering plants belonging to the family Apocynaceae.

Its native range is Panama to Tropical America.

Species:

- Ibatia aristeguietae (Morillo) Morillo
- Ibatia boliviensis (Schltr.) Morillo
- Ibatia ciliata E.Fourn.
- Ibatia cordata (Malme) Morillo
- Ibatia cumanensis (Willd. ex Schult.) Morillo
- Ibatia demuneri (Goes & Fontella) Morillo
- Ibatia dugandii (Krings) Morillo
- Ibatia elliptica (Rusby) Morillo
- Ibatia fiebrigii (Schltr.) Morillo
- Ibatia fontana (Saville & Krings) Morillo
- Ibatia friesii (Malme) Morillo
- Ibatia ganglinosa (Vell.) Morillo
- Ibatia harleyi (Fontella & Morillo) Morillo
- Ibatia laciniata (E.Fourn.) Morillo
- Ibatia lanosa E.Fourn.
- Ibatia maritima (Jacq.) Decne.
- Ibatia mollis Griseb.
- Ibatia morilloana (Fontella) Morillo
- Ibatia nigra (Decne.) Morillo
- Ibatia pacifica (Krings & Saville) Morillo
- Ibatia rubra (H.Karst.) Morillo
- Ibatia rusbyi Morillo
- Ibatia santosii (Fontella & Morillo) Morillo
- Ibatia schreiteri (T.Mey.) Morillo
- Ibatia venturii (Malme) Morillo
- Ibatia woodii Morillo
