= Tassadia =

Scientific classification
- Kingdom: Plantae
- Clade: Tracheophytes
- Clade: Angiosperms
- Clade: Eudicots
- Clade: Asterids
- Order: Gentianales
- Family: Apocynaceae
- Subfamily: Asclepiadoideae
- Tribe: Asclepiadeae
- Genus: Tassadia; Decne.

Synonyms
- Glaziostelma E.Fourn. (1885); Lorostelma E.Fourn. (1885); Madarosperma Benth. (1876); Sattadia E.Fourn. (1885); Stenomeria Turcz. (1852)

Genus of plants

Tassadia is a genus of plants in the family Apocynaceae, first described as a genus in 1844. It is native primarily to South America, with one species extending north into Central America, S Mexico, and Trinidad.

== Species ==
31 species are accepted:

1. Tassadia aristata (Benth. ex E.Fourn.) Fontella - NW Brazil
2. Tassadia berteroanum (Spreng.) W.D.Stevens - Suriname, Venezuela, N Brazil
3. Tassadia burchellii E.Fourn. - Brazil
4. Tassadia capitata W.D. Stevens - Bolivia, Brazil
5. Tassadia castellanosii Fontella - Amazonas State in Venezuela
6. Tassadia cordata Malme - Peru
7. Tassadia decaisneana Miq. - Guyana, Suriname
8. Tassadia decalepis (Turcz.) Liede & Meve – northern South America
9. Tassadia emygdioi Fontella - Venezuela
10. Tassadia fosteri (Morillo) Liede & Meve – Peru
11. Tassadia geniculata Fontella - Brazil
12. Tassadia grazielae Fontella - Peru, Bolivia
13. Tassadia guanchezii (Morillo) Liede & Meve – southeastern Colombia to Venezuela (Amazonas) and northern Brazil
14. Tassadia guianensis Decne. - Brazil, Ecuador, 3 Guianas
15. Tassadia ivonae Morillo - Amazonas + Bolívar States in S Venezuela
16. Tassadia kamaensis (Morillo) Morillo - Bolívar State in SE Venezuela
17. Tassadia lanceolata Decne. – Brazil (Minas Gerais)
18. Tassadia leptobotrys Decne. - Suriname, N Brazil
19. Tassadia manarae (Morillo) Liede & Meve - Venezuela
20. Tassadia martiana Decne. - Brazil
21. Tassadia medinae (Morillo) Morillo - Venezuela, N Brazil
22. Tassadia milanezii Fontella - Peru, NW Brazil
23. Tassadia obovata Decne. - widespread from Veracruz + Trinidad south to Bolivia
24. Tassadia ovalifolia (E.Fourn.) Fontella - Venezuela, N Brazil
25. Tassadia pentalepis (Turcz.) Liede & Meve – northwestern Venezuela to northern Peru
26. Tassadia propinqua Decne. - Venezuela, N Brazil, Guyana, Suriname
27. Tassadia richardiana (Alain) Liede & Mangelsdorff – Cuba
28. Tassadia rizzoana Fontella - N + NW Brazil
29. Tassadia strica (E.Fourn.) Liede & Rapini - southeastern Colombia to Venezuela (Amazonas) and Brazil (Amazonas)
30. Tassadia trailiana (Benth.) Fontella - Guyana, N Brazil, Amazonas State in Venezuela
31. Tassadia valioi Fontella - Peru, Ecuador
