= Dolichopetalum =

Scientific classification
- Kingdom: Plantae
- Clade: Tracheophytes
- Clade: Angiosperms
- Clade: Eudicots
- Clade: Asterids
- Order: Gentianales
- Family: Apocynaceae
- Subfamily: Asclepiadoideae
- Tribe: Marsdenieae
- Genus: Dolichopetalum; Tsiang
- Species: D. kwangsiense

Binomial name
- Dolichopetalum kwangsiense Tsiang

Genus of flowering plants

Dolichopetalum is a genus of plants in the family Apocynaceae, first described as a genus in 1973. It contains only one known species, Dolichopetalum kwangsiense, endemic to China, known from the Provinces of Guangxi, Guizhou, and Yunnan.
