= Campestigma =

Scientific classification
- Kingdom: Plantae
- Clade: Tracheophytes
- Clade: Angiosperms
- Clade: Eudicots
- Clade: Asterids
- Order: Gentianales
- Family: Apocynaceae
- Subfamily: Asclepiadoideae
- Tribe: Marsdenieae
- Genus: Campestigma; Pierre ex Costantin
- Species: C. purpurea

Binomial name
- Campestigma purpurea Pierre ex Costantin

Genus of plants

Campestigma is a species of plants in the family Apocynaceae first described as a genus in 1912. It contains only one known species, Campestigma purpurea, native to Laos and Vietnam.
