= Schizostephanus =

Scientific classification
- Kingdom: Plantae
- Clade: Tracheophytes
- Clade: Angiosperms
- Clade: Eudicots
- Clade: Asterids
- Order: Gentianales
- Family: Apocynaceae
- Subfamily: Asclepiadoideae
- Tribe: Asclepiadeae
- Genus: Schizostephanus; Hochst. ex Benth. & Hook.f.

Genus of plants

Schizostephanus is a genus of flowering plants belonging to the family Apocynaceae.

Its native range is Eritrea to Southern Africa.

== Species ==
Species:

- Schizostephanus alatus Hochst. ex K.Schum.
- Schizostephanus gossweileri (S.Moore) Liede
