= Schistonema =

Scientific classification
- Kingdom: Plantae
- Clade: Tracheophytes
- Clade: Angiosperms
- Clade: Eudicots
- Clade: Asterids
- Order: Gentianales
- Family: Apocynaceae
- Subfamily: Asclepiadoideae
- Tribe: Asclepiadeae
- Genus: Schistonema; Schltr.
- Species: S. weberbaueri

Binomial name
- Schistonema weberbaueri weberbaueri

Species of plant

Schistonema is a group of plants in the family Apocynaceae first described as a genus in 1906. It contains only one known species, Schistonema weberbaueri, native to the Cajamarca region of Peru.
