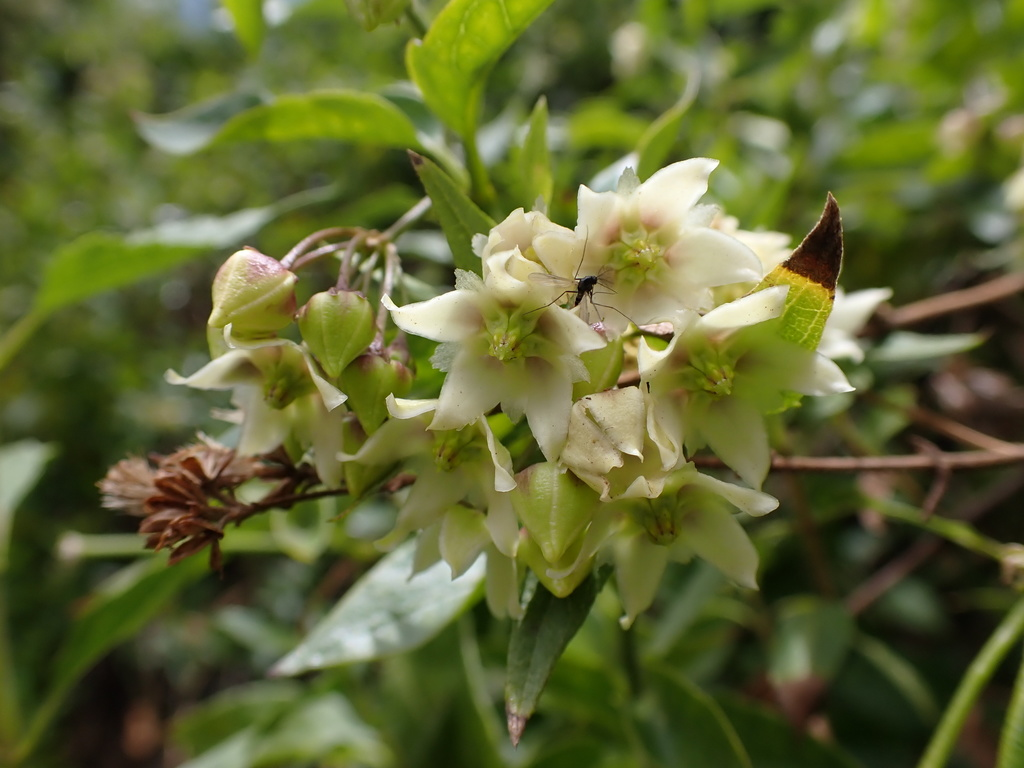

Scientific classification
- Kingdom: Plantae
- Clade: Tracheophytes
- Clade: Angiosperms
- Clade: Eudicots
- Clade: Asterids
- Order: Gentianales
- Family: Apocynaceae
- Subfamily: Asclepiadoideae
- Tribe: Asclepiadeae
- Genus: Jobinia; E.Fourn.

Synonyms
- Cyathostelma E.Fourn.

= Jobinia =

Genus of plants

Jobinia is a genus of flowering plants of the family Apocynaceae first described in 1885. It is native to South America and Central America.

== Species ==
As of November 2023, Plants of the World Online accepted the following species:

- Jobinia balslevii (Morillo) W.D.Stevens
- Jobinia campii (Morillo) W.D.Stevens
- Jobinia canoi (Morillo) Liede & Meve
- Jobinia chlorantha (K.Schum.) Malme – Ecuador, Bolivia
- Jobinia connivens (Hook. & Arn.) Malme – South Brazil
- Jobinia eulaxiflora (Lundell) W.D.Stevens – Guatemala
- Jobinia fontellana Liede & Meve
- Jobinia formosa (N.E.Br.) Liede & Meve
- Jobinia glossostemma (Lillo) Liede & Meve – Tucumán and Catamarca in Argentina
- Jobinia grandis (Hand.-Mazz.) Goes & Fontella – Brazil
- Jobinia hatschbachii Fontella & E.A.Schwarz – Paraná
- Jobinia latipes (Decne.) Liede & Meve
- Jobinia lindbergii E.Fourn. – South Brazil, Misiones Province in Argentina
- Jobinia longicoronata Goes & Fontella – Espírito Santo
- Jobinia mazzuchii (Speg.) Liede & Meve
- Jobinia neei (Morillo) Liede & Meve – Amazonas State in Venezuela
- Jobinia paranaensis Fontella & C.Valente – Paraná
- Jobinia peruviana Liede & Meve
- Jobinia samuelssonii (Malme) Liede & Meve
- Jobinia schizocorona (Liede & Meve) Liede & Meve
- Jobinia streptantha (Malme) Liede & Meve
- Jobinia tarmensis (Schltr.) Liede & Meve
- Jobinia tiarata (Malme) Liede & Meve
- Jobinia trifurcata (Griseb.) Liede & Meve
- Jobinia umbellata (Rusby) Liede & Meve
