= Widgrenia =

Scientific classification
- Kingdom: Plantae
- Clade: Embryophytes
- Clade: Tracheophytes
- Clade: Angiosperms
- Clade: Eudicots
- Clade: Asterids
- Order: Gentianales
- Family: Apocynaceae
- Subfamily: Asclepiadoideae
- Tribe: Asclepiadeae
- Genus: Oxypetalum
- Species: O. corymbosum

Binomial name
- Oxypetalum corymbosum (Malme) Liede & Meve

Synonyms
- Widgrenia corymbosa Malme; Melinia corymbosa (Malme) Fontella & Farinaccio; Melinia iberae J.L.Fontana

Former genus of flowering plants

Widgrenia is a former monotypic genus of flowering plants in the family Apocynaceae. Its sole species, Widgrenia corymbosa, is now accepted as Oxypetalum corymbosum (Malme) Liede & Meve. The species belongs to the subfamily Asclepiadoideae, tribe Asclepiadeae, and subtribe Oxypetalinae.

== Taxonomy ==
Swedish botanist Gustaf Oskar Andersson Malme established Widgrenia and described W. corymbosa in 1900. The genus was traditionally regarded as monotypic, and the names Melinia corymbosa and Melinia iberae were subsequently applied to the same species.

A 2015 molecular phylogenetic study by Sigrid Liede-Schumann and Ulrich Meve, based on four chloroplast DNA regions, found that Widgrenia was nested within the larger genus Oxypetalum. They consequently published the new combination Oxypetalum corymbosum. Plants of the World Online treats Widgrenia as a synonym of Oxypetalum and accepts O. corymbosum as the species name.

== Description and habitat ==
Oxypetalum corymbosum is an erect marsh plant with narrow, linear leaves. These characters distinguish it from the other Argentine species of Oxypetalum in a published identification key.

== Distribution ==
The species is native to South America, where its range includes eastern Bolivia, Paraguay, southern, south-eastern and west-central Brazil, and north-eastern Argentina, including Corrientes Province.
