= Periglossum =

Scientific classification
- Kingdom: Plantae
- Clade: Tracheophytes
- Clade: Angiosperms
- Clade: Eudicots
- Clade: Asterids
- Order: Gentianales
- Family: Apocynaceae
- Subfamily: Asclepiadoideae
- Tribe: Asclepiadeae
- Genus: Periglossum; Decne.

Genus of flowering plants

Periglossum is a genus of flowering plants in the family Apocynaceae, first described as a genus in 1844. It is native to southern Africa.

Species

1. Periglossum angustifolium DC. - South Africa
2. Periglossum kassnerianum Schltr. - South Africa
3. Periglossum mackenii Harv. - South Africa
4. Periglossum macrum Decne. - South Africa
5. Periglossum mossambicense Schltr. - Mozambique
