= Miraglossum =

Scientific classification
- Kingdom: Plantae
- Clade: Tracheophytes
- Clade: Angiosperms
- Clade: Eudicots
- Clade: Asterids
- Order: Gentianales
- Family: Apocynaceae
- Subfamily: Asclepiadoideae
- Tribe: Asclepiadeae
- Genus: Miraglossum; Kupicha

Type species
- Miraglossum pulchellum (Schltr.) Kupicha

Genus of plants

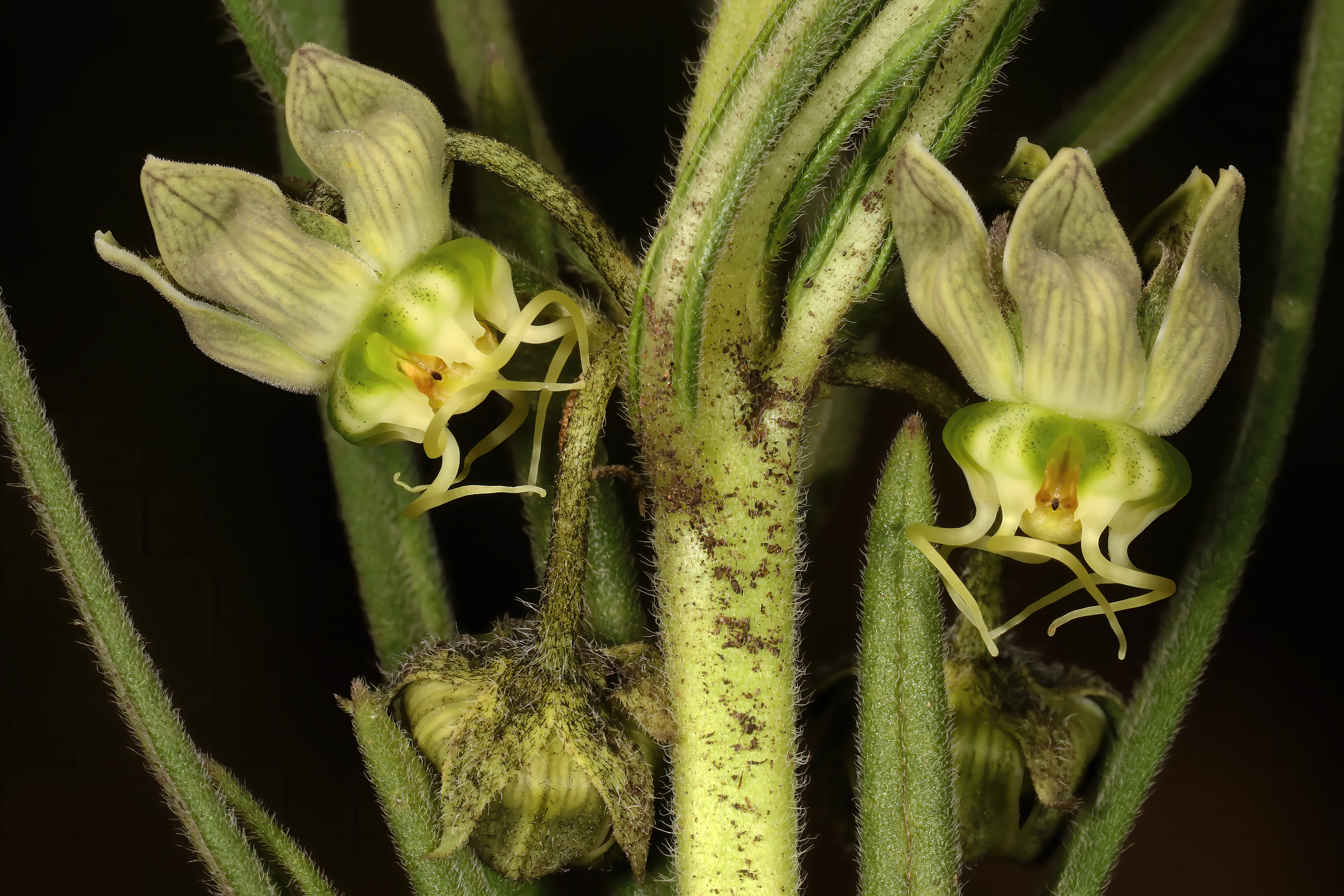
Miraglossum verticillare

Miraglossum is a genus of plants in the family Apocynaceae, first described as a genus in 1984. It is native to southern Africa.

Species

1. Miraglossum anomalum (N.E. Br.) Kupicha - South Africa
2. Miraglossum davyi (N.E. Br.) Kupicha - South Africa
3. Miraglossum laeve Kupicha - Limpopo, Mpumalanga, Gauteng
4. Miraglossum pilosum (Schltr.) Kupicha - KwaZulu-Natal
5. Miraglossum pulchellum (Schltr.) Kupicha - Eswatini, Gauteng
6. Miraglossum superbum Kupicha - KwaZulu-Natal
7. Miraglossum verticillare (Schltr.) Kupicha - KwaZulu-Natal
