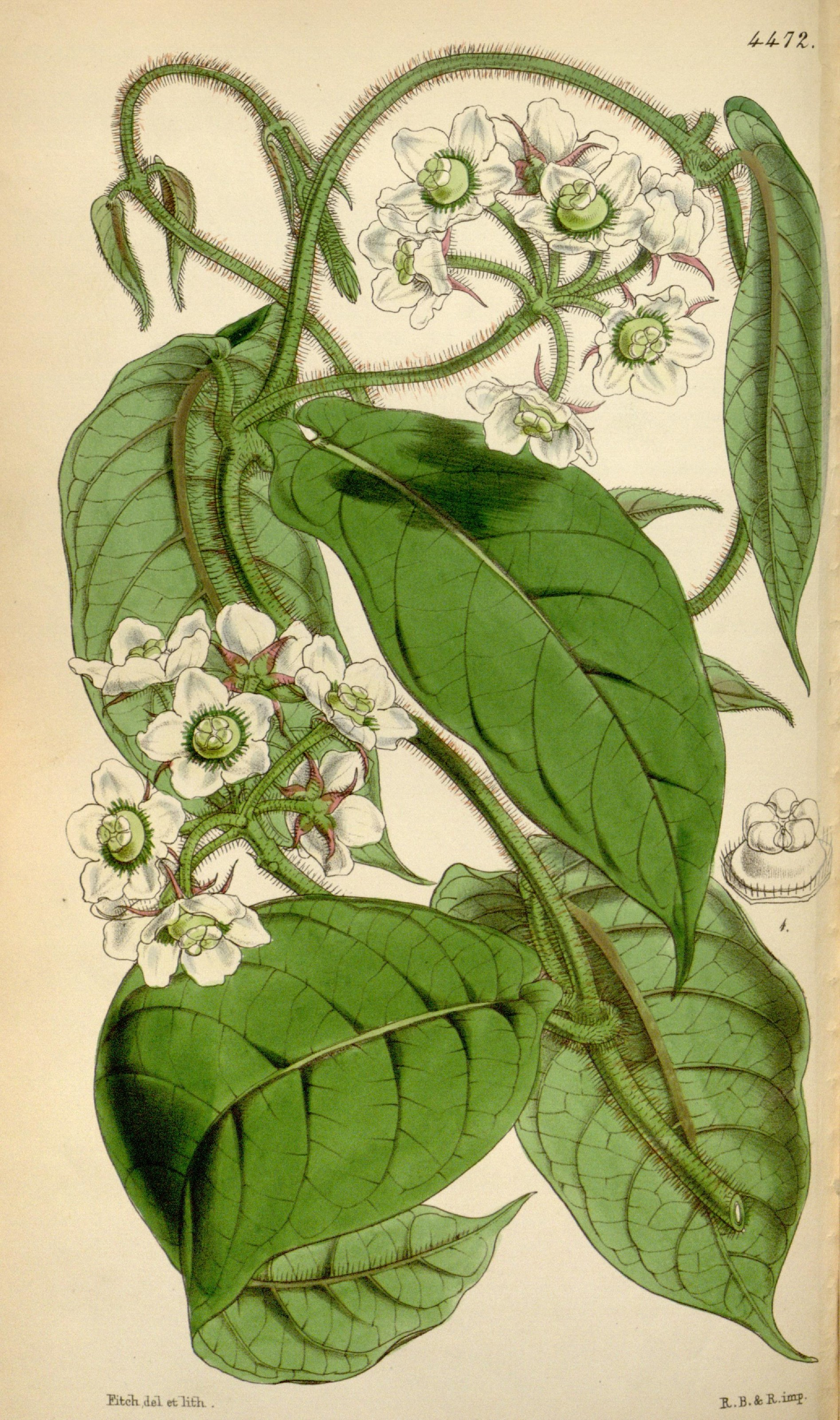
- Fischeria stellata Illustration from Curtis's Botanical Magazine

Scientific classification
- Kingdom: Plantae
- Clade: Embryophytes
- Clade: Tracheophytes
- Clade: Angiosperms
- Clade: Eudicots
- Clade: Asterids
- Order: Gentianales
- Family: Apocynaceae
- Subfamily: Asclepiadoideae
- Tribe: Asclepiadeae
- Genus: Fischeria; DC. 1813

Type species
- Fischeria scandens DC.

= Fischeria (plant) =

Genus of flowering plants

Fischeria is a plant genus in the family Apocynaceae, first described as a genus in 1813. It is native to South America, Central America, southern Mexico, and the West Indies. The genus is named in honour of Friedrich Ernst Ludwig von Fischer.

Species

1. Fischeria billbergiana (Beurl.) Morillo - Costa Rica, Panama, Colombia
2. Fischeria blepharopetala S.F.Blake - Costa Rica, Panama, Colombia
3. Fischeria brachycalyx L.O.Williams - Costa Rica, Panama
4. Fischeria panamensis Spellman - Costa Rica, Panama, Nicaragua
5. Fischeria polytricha Decne. - Brazil
6. Fischeria scandens DC. - S Mexico (Veracruz, Tabasco, Oaxaca, Puebla, Campeche, Quinana Roo, Chiapas), Central America, Ecuador, Bolivia, Cuba, Jamaica
7. Fischeria stellata (Vell.) E.Fourn. - Brazil, Venezuela, Colombia, Trinidad & Tobago, Ecuador, Peru, Bolivia, Paraguay, Misiones Province of Argentina

formerly included

1. F. aristolochiifolia, synonym of Gonolobus aristolochiifolius
2. F. cincta, synonym of Gonolobus stapelioides
3. F. heterophylla, synonym of Gonolobus heterophyllus
4. F. hispida, synonym of Gonolobus hispidus
5. F. setosa, synonym of Gonolobus setosus
