= Pherotrichis =

Scientific classification
- Kingdom: Plantae
- Clade: Tracheophytes
- Clade: Angiosperms
- Clade: Eudicots
- Clade: Asterids
- Order: Gentianales
- Family: Apocynaceae
- Subfamily: Asclepiadoideae
- Tribe: Asclepiadeae
- Genus: Pherotrichis; Decne.

Genus of flowering plants

Pherotrichis is a plant genus in the family Apocynaceae, first described as a genus in 1838. It is native to Mexico and Arizona.

Species

1. Pherotrichis leptogenia B.L.Rob. - Jalisco
2. Pherotrichis mixtecana Brandegee - Oaxaca
3. Pherotrichis schaffneri A.Gray - San Luis Potosí, Cochise County in Arizona

formerly included

moved to Matelea

- Pherotrichis villosa (Schult.) Meisn, synonym of Matelea balbisii (Decne.) Woodson.
