= Gymnemopsis =

Scientific classification
- Kingdom: Plantae
- Clade: Tracheophytes
- Clade: Angiosperms
- Clade: Eudicots
- Clade: Asterids
- Order: Gentianales
- Family: Apocynaceae
- Subfamily: Asclepiadoideae
- Tribe: Marsdenieae
- Genus: Gymnemopsis; Costantin

Type species
- Gymnemopsis pierrei Costantin

Genus of flowering plants

Gymnemopsis is a plant genus in the family Apocynaceae, first described as a genus in 1912. It is native to Indochina.

Species

1. Gymnemopsis calcicola Kerr - Thailand
2. Gymnemopsis pierrei Costantin - Vietnam
