= Parapodium (plant) =

Scientific classification
- Kingdom: Plantae
- Clade: Embryophytes
- Clade: Tracheophytes
- Clade: Spermatophytes
- Clade: Angiosperms
- Clade: Eudicots
- Clade: Asterids
- Order: Gentianales
- Family: Apocynaceae
- Subfamily: Asclepiadoideae
- Tribe: Asclepiadeae
- Genus: Parapodium; E.Mey.

Type species
- Parapodium costatum E.Mey.

Synonyms
- Rhombonema Schltr.

Genus of orchids from South Africa

Parapodium is a genus of flowering plants of the family Apocynaceae, first described as a genus in 1838. It is native to South Africa.

Species

1. Parapodium costatum E.Mey. - South Africa
2. Parapodium crispum N.E.Br. - South Africa
3. Parapodium simile N.E.Br. - South Africa
