= Mahawoa =

Scientific classification
- Kingdom: Plantae
- Clade: Tracheophytes
- Clade: Angiosperms
- Clade: Eudicots
- Clade: Asterids
- Order: Gentianales
- Family: Apocynaceae
- Subfamily: Asclepiadoideae
- Tribe: Asclepiadeae
- Genus: Mahawoa; Schltr.
- Species: M. montana

Binomial name
- Mahawoa montana Schltr.

Genus of plants

Mahawoa is a monotypic genus of flowering plants belonging to the family Apocynaceae. The only species is Mahawoa montana.

Its native range is Central Malesia.
