= Scyphostelma =

Scientific classification
- Kingdom: Plantae
- Clade: Tracheophytes
- Clade: Angiosperms
- Clade: Eudicots
- Clade: Asterids
- Order: Gentianales
- Family: Apocynaceae
- Subfamily: Asclepiadoideae
- Genus: Scyphostelma; Baill. (1890)

Synonyms
- Liedea W.D.Stevens (2005)

Genus of plants

Scyphostelma is a genus of plants in the dogbane family (Apocynaceae). It includes 28 species, which range from Costa Rica to Venezuela and Bolivia.

== Species ==
28 species are accepted:

- Scyphostelma beckii (Morillo) Liede & Meve
- Scyphostelma bifidum (Liede & Meve) Liede & Meve
- Scyphostelma brachyphyllum (K.Schum.) Liede & Meve
- Scyphostelma carmenaemiliae (Morillo) Liede & Meve
- Scyphostelma chimboracense (Morillo) Liede & Meve
- Scyphostelma confusum (R.W.Holm) Liede & Meve
- Scyphostelma ecuadorense (Schltr.) Liede & Meve
- Scyphostelma filisepalum (Standl.) Liede & Meve
- Scyphostelma granatensis Baill.
- Scyphostelma harlingii (Morillo) Liede & Meve
- Scyphostelma intricatum (K.Schum.) Liede & Meve
- Scyphostelma isidrense (Morillo) Liede & Meve
- Scyphostelma lechleri (Morillo) Liede & Meve
- Scyphostelma longecalicinum (Morillo) Liede & Meve
- Scyphostelma luteynii (Morillo) Liede & Meve
- Scyphostelma microphylla (Kunth) Liede & Meve
- Scyphostelma nubicola (Morillo) Liede & Meve
- Scyphostelma pichinchense (K.Schum.) Liede & Meve
- Scyphostelma rugosum (Turcz.) Morillo
- Scyphostelma ruizteranii (Morillo) Liede & Meve
- Scyphostelma serpyllifolium (Kunth) Liede & Meve
- Scyphostelma siderocalyx (Morillo) Liede & Meve
- Scyphostelma sodiroi (K.Schum.) Liede & Meve
- Scyphostelma tenellum (L.f.) Liede & Meve
- Scyphostelma trianae (Schltr.) Liede & Meve
- Scyphostelma veleziae (Morillo) Liede & Meve
- Scyphostelma velutinum (Morillo) Liede & Meve
- Scyphostelma wurdackii (Morillo) Liede & Meve
