= Oreosparte =

Scientific classification
- Kingdom: Plantae
- Clade: Tracheophytes
- Clade: Angiosperms
- Clade: Eudicots
- Clade: Asterids
- Order: Gentianales
- Family: Apocynaceae
- Subfamily: Asclepiadoideae
- Tribe: Marsdenieae
- Genus: Oreosparte; Schltr.
- Species: O. celebica

Binomial name
- Oreosparte celebica Schltr.

Genus of plants

Oreosparte is a monotypic genus of flowering plants belonging to the family Apocynaceae. The only species is Oreosparte celebica.

Its native range is Western and Central Malesia.
