= Treutlera =

Scientific classification
- Kingdom: Plantae
- Clade: Tracheophytes
- Clade: Angiosperms
- Clade: Eudicots
- Clade: Asterids
- Order: Gentianales
- Family: Apocynaceae
- Subfamily: Asclepiadoideae
- Tribe: Marsdenieae
- Genus: Treutlera; Hook.f.
- Species: T. insignis

Binomial name
- Treutlera insignis Hook.f.

Species of flowering plant

Treutlera is a monotypic genus of flowering plants belonging to the family Apocynaceae. It only contains one known species, Treutlera insignis.

It is native to Nepal, the East Himalaya and Assam in India.

The genus name of Treutlera is in honour of William John Treutler (1841–1915), a British doctor who also worked at Kew Gardens. The Latin specific epithet of insignis means significant. Both the genus and the species were first described and published in Hooker's Icon. Pl. Vol.15 on table 1425 in 1883.
