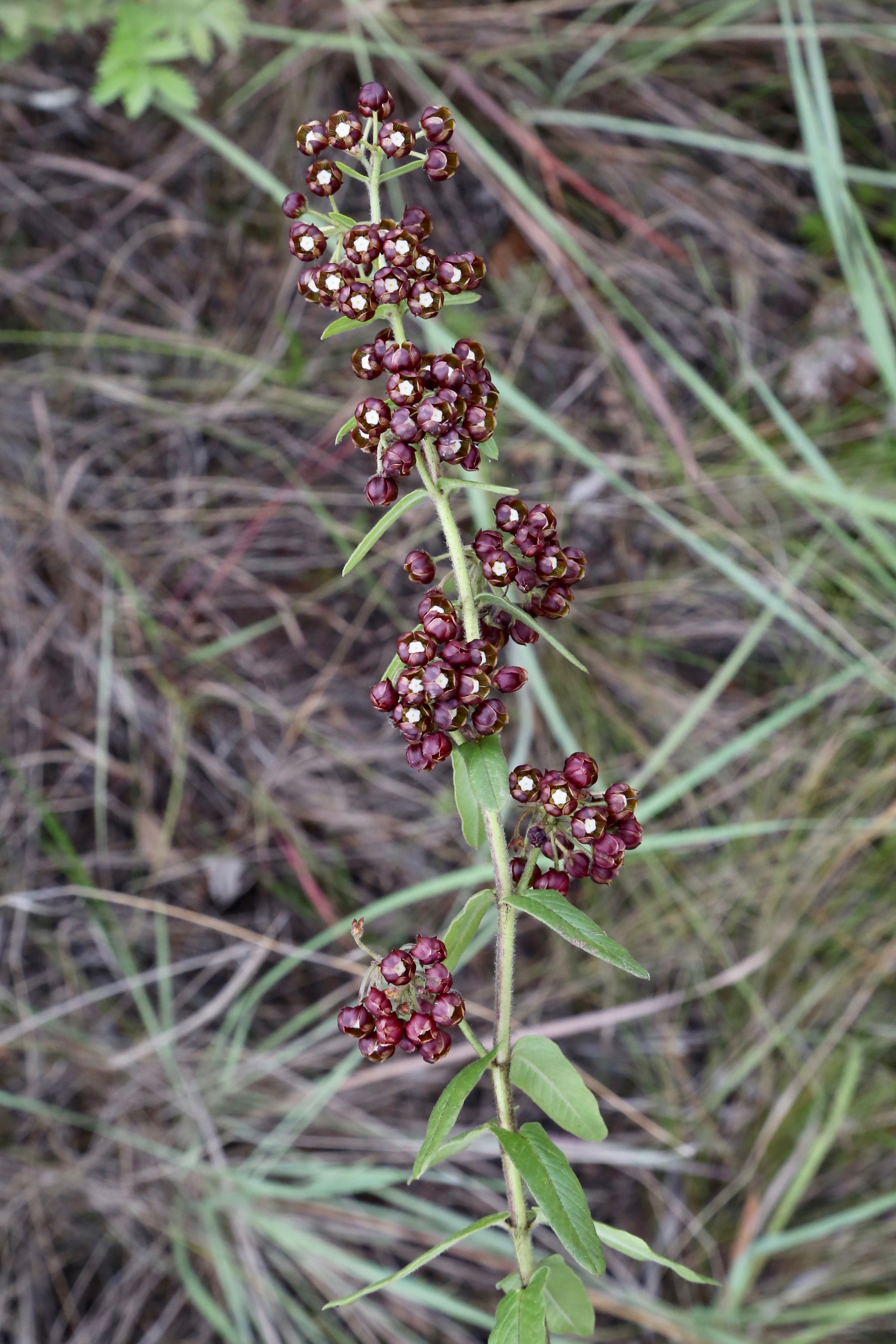

Scientific classification
- Kingdom: Plantae
- Clade: Embryophytes
- Clade: Tracheophytes
- Clade: Spermatophytes
- Clade: Angiosperms
- Clade: Eudicots
- Clade: Asterids
- Order: Gentianales
- Family: Apocynaceae
- Subfamily: Asclepiadoideae
- Tribe: Asclepiadeae
- Genus: Schizoglossum; E.Mey.

Synonyms
- Lagarinthus E.Mey.; Mackenia Harv.

= Schizoglossum =

Genus of plants

Schizoglossum is a genus of flowering plants belonging to the family Apocynaceae. It is characterized by a distinctive mechanism in which nectar is delivered onto the corolla through channels in the interstaminal corona. In some species, the interstaminal corona may function primarily as the outer boundary of the primary nectary just below the entrance to the guide rail.

Its native range is Southern Tropical and Southern Africa.

== Species ==
Species:

- Schizoglossum amatolicum Hilliard
- Schizoglossum angolense Schltr. & Rendle
- Schizoglossum aschersonianum Schltr.
- Schizoglossum atropurpureum E.Mey.
- Schizoglossum austromontanum Bester & Nicholas
- Schizoglossum barbatum Britton & Rendle
- Schizoglossum bidens E.Mey.
- Schizoglossum cordifolium E.Mey.
- Schizoglossum crassipes S.Moore
- Schizoglossum elingue N.E.Br.
- Schizoglossum flavum Schltr.
- Schizoglossum garcianum Schltr.
- Schizoglossum graminifolium C.Norman
- Schizoglossum hamatum E.Mey.
- Schizoglossum hilliardiae Kupicha
- Schizoglossum ingomense N.E.Br.
- Schizoglossum linifolium Schltr.
- Schizoglossum montanum R.A.Dyer
- Schizoglossum nitidum Schltr.
- Schizoglossum peglerae N.E.Br.
- Schizoglossum quadridens N.E.Br.
- Schizoglossum rubiginosum Hilliard
- Schizoglossum saccatum Bruyns
- Schizoglossum singulare Kupicha
- Schizoglossum stenoglossum Schltr.
- Schizoglossum viridulum K.Schum.
