= Oncinema =

Scientific classification
- Kingdom: Plantae
- Clade: Embryophytes
- Clade: Tracheophytes
- Clade: Spermatophytes
- Clade: Angiosperms
- Clade: Eudicots
- Clade: Asterids
- Order: Gentianales
- Family: Apocynaceae
- Subfamily: Asclepiadoideae
- Tribe: Asclepiadeae
- Genus: Oncinema; Arn.
- Species: O. lineare

Binomial name
- Oncinema lineare (L.f.) Bullock

Synonyms
- Apocynum lineare L.f.; Astephanus linearis (L.f.) R.Br.; Astephanus linearis (L.f.) R.Br. ex Schult.; Glossostephanus linearis (L.f.) E.Mey.; Oncinema roxburghii Arn.; Periploca capensis Roxb. ex Arn.

Genus of African flowering plants

Oncinema is a genus of plants in the family Apocynaceae first described as a genus in 1834. It contains only one known species, Oncinema lineare , native to South Africa.
