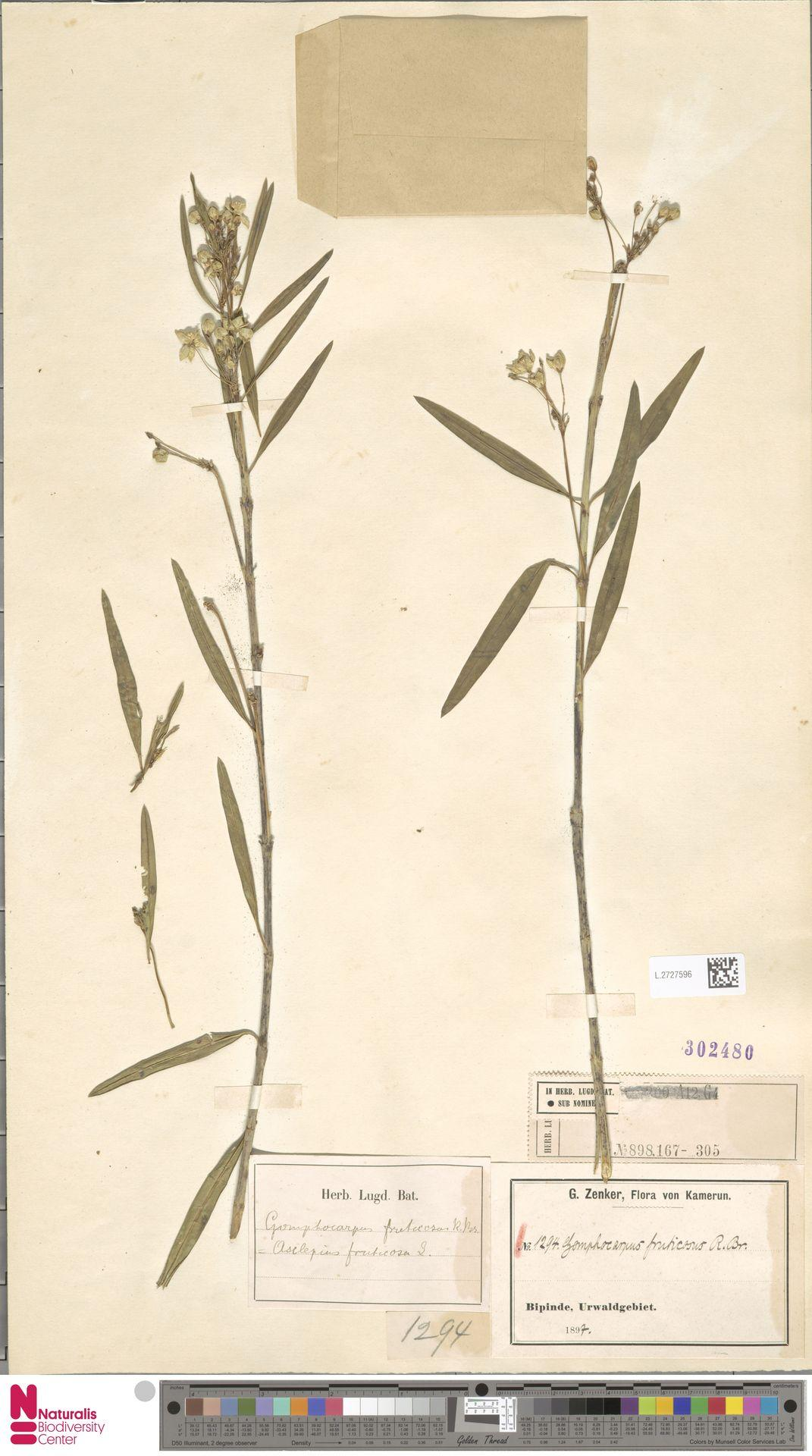
- Kanahia consimilis N.E.Br. (Kanahia laniflora)

Scientific classification
- Kingdom: Plantae
- Clade: Tracheophytes
- Clade: Angiosperms
- Clade: Eudicots
- Clade: Asterids
- Order: Gentianales
- Family: Apocynaceae
- Subfamily: Asclepiadoideae
- Tribe: Asclepiadeae
- Genus: Kanahia; R.Br.

Type species
- Kanahia laniflora (Forssk.) R.Br.

= Kanahia =

Genus of plants

Kanahia is a genus of flowering plants of the family Apocynaceae, first described as a genus in 1810. It is native to Africa and to the Arabian Peninsula.

Species

1. Kanahia carlsbergiana D.V.Field, Friis & M.G.Gilbert - Bale Region of Ethiopia
2. Kanahia delilii Kotschy ex Decne. - Mount Aquaro in Ethiopia
3. Kanahia forskalii Decne. - Yemen
4. Kanahia laniflora (Forssk.) R.Br. 1810 not G.Don 1837 nor K.Schum. 1895 - Arabia, Sudan, Ethiopia
5. Kanahia monroi S.Moore - Zimbabwe
