= Lygisma =

Scientific classification
- Kingdom: Plantae
- Clade: Tracheophytes
- Clade: Angiosperms
- Clade: Eudicots
- Clade: Asterids
- Order: Gentianales
- Family: Apocynaceae
- Subfamily: Asclepiadoideae
- Tribe: Marsdenieae
- Genus: Lygisma; Hook.f.

Type species
- Lygisma angustifolia (Wight) Hook.f.

Genus of plants

Lygisma is a plant genus in the family Apocynaceae, first described as a genus in 1883. It is native to southern China, Indochina, Malaysia, and the Himalayas.

Species

1. Lygisma angustifolia (Wight) Hook.f. - Himalayas
2. Lygisma flavum (Ridl.) Kerr - Peninsular Malaysia
3. Lygisma inflexum (Costantin) Kerr - Vietnam, Guangdong, Guangxi, Hainan
4. Lygisma nervosum Kerr - Thailand
