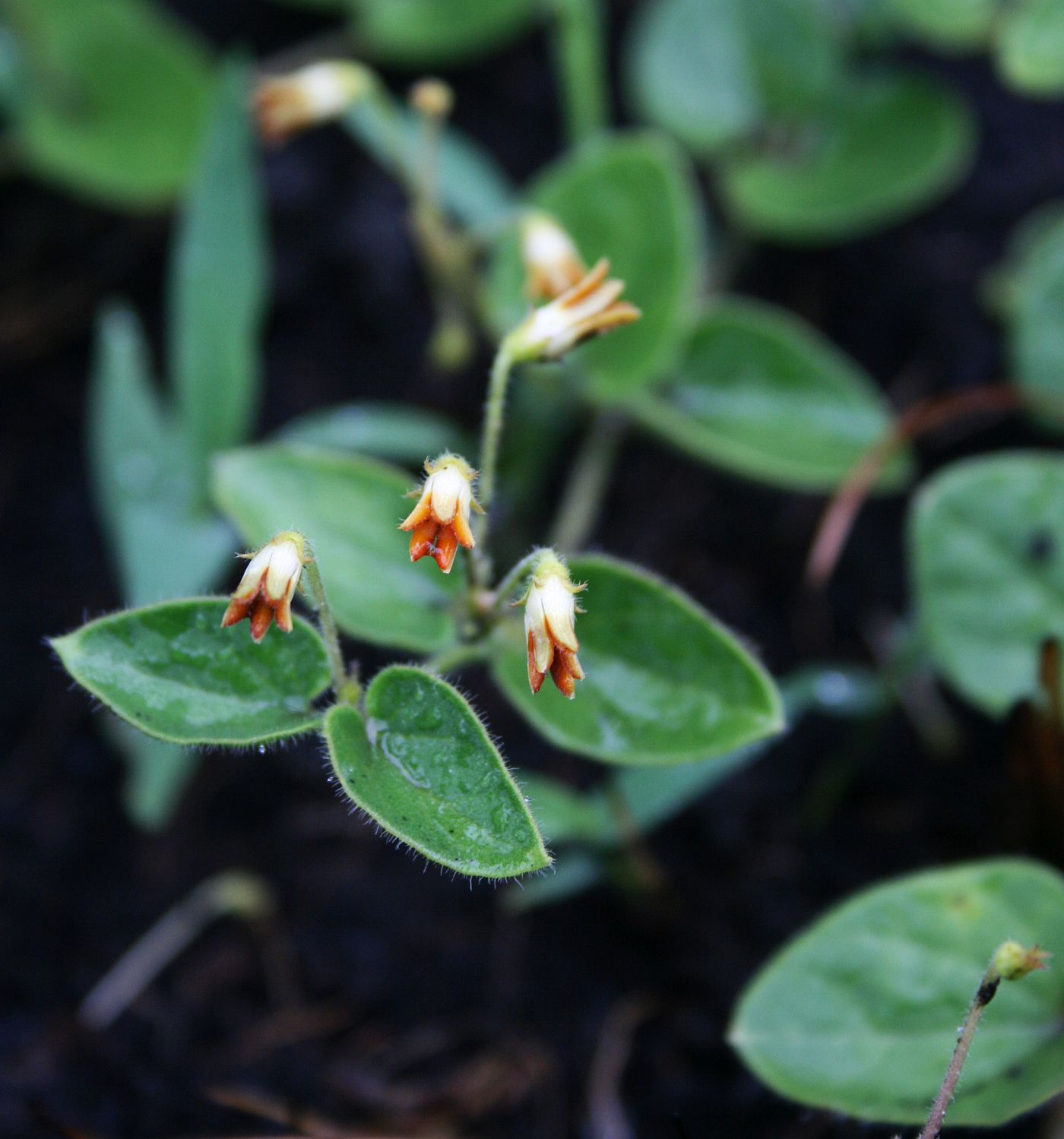
- Anisotoma pedunculata

Scientific classification
- Kingdom: Plantae
- Clade: Tracheophytes
- Clade: Angiosperms
- Clade: Eudicots
- Clade: Asterids
- Order: Gentianales
- Family: Apocynaceae
- Subfamily: Asclepiadoideae
- Tribe: Ceropegieae
- Genus: Anisotoma; Fenzl

Type species
- Anisotoma cordifolia Fenzl

= Anisotoma =

Genus of plants

Anisotoma is a genus of flowering plants formerly belonging to the plant family Asclepiadaceae, now considered to be part of the Apocynaceae, first described as a genus in 1844. They are native to South Africa

Species

1. Anisotoma cordifolia Fenzl - South Africa
2. Anisotoma pedunculata N.E.Br. - KwaZulu-Natal

Formerly included, transferred to Brachystelma

Anisotoma arnottii (Baker) Benth. & Hook.f. ex B.D.Jacks. synonym of Brachystelma arnottii Baker
