= Pycnorhachis =

Scientific classification
- Kingdom: Plantae
- Clade: Embryophytes
- Clade: Tracheophytes
- Clade: Angiosperms
- Clade: Eudicots
- Clade: Asterids
- Order: Gentianales
- Family: Apocynaceae
- Subfamily: Asclepiadoideae
- Tribe: Marsdenieae
- Genus: Pycnorhachis; Benth.
- Species: P. maingayi

Binomial name
- Pycnorhachis maingayi Hook.f.

Genus of plants

Pycnorhachis is a monotypic genus of flowering plants belonging to the family Apocynaceae. The only species is Pycnorhachis maingayi.

Its native range is Peninsular Malaysia.
