= Rhyssolobium =

Scientific classification
- Kingdom: Plantae
- Clade: Embryophytes
- Clade: Tracheophytes
- Clade: Spermatophytes
- Clade: Angiosperms
- Clade: Eudicots
- Clade: Asterids
- Order: Gentianales
- Family: Apocynaceae
- Subfamily: Asclepiadoideae
- Tribe: Marsdenieae
- Genus: Rhyssolobium; E.Mey.
- Species: R. dumosum

Binomial name
- Rhyssolobium dumosum E.Mey.

Synonyms
- Astephanus dumosus (E.Mey.) D.Dietr.

Genus of plants

Rhyssolobium is a genus of flowering plants of the family Apocynaceae, first described as a genus in 1838. It contains only one known species, Rhyssolobium dumosum, endemic to South Africa.
