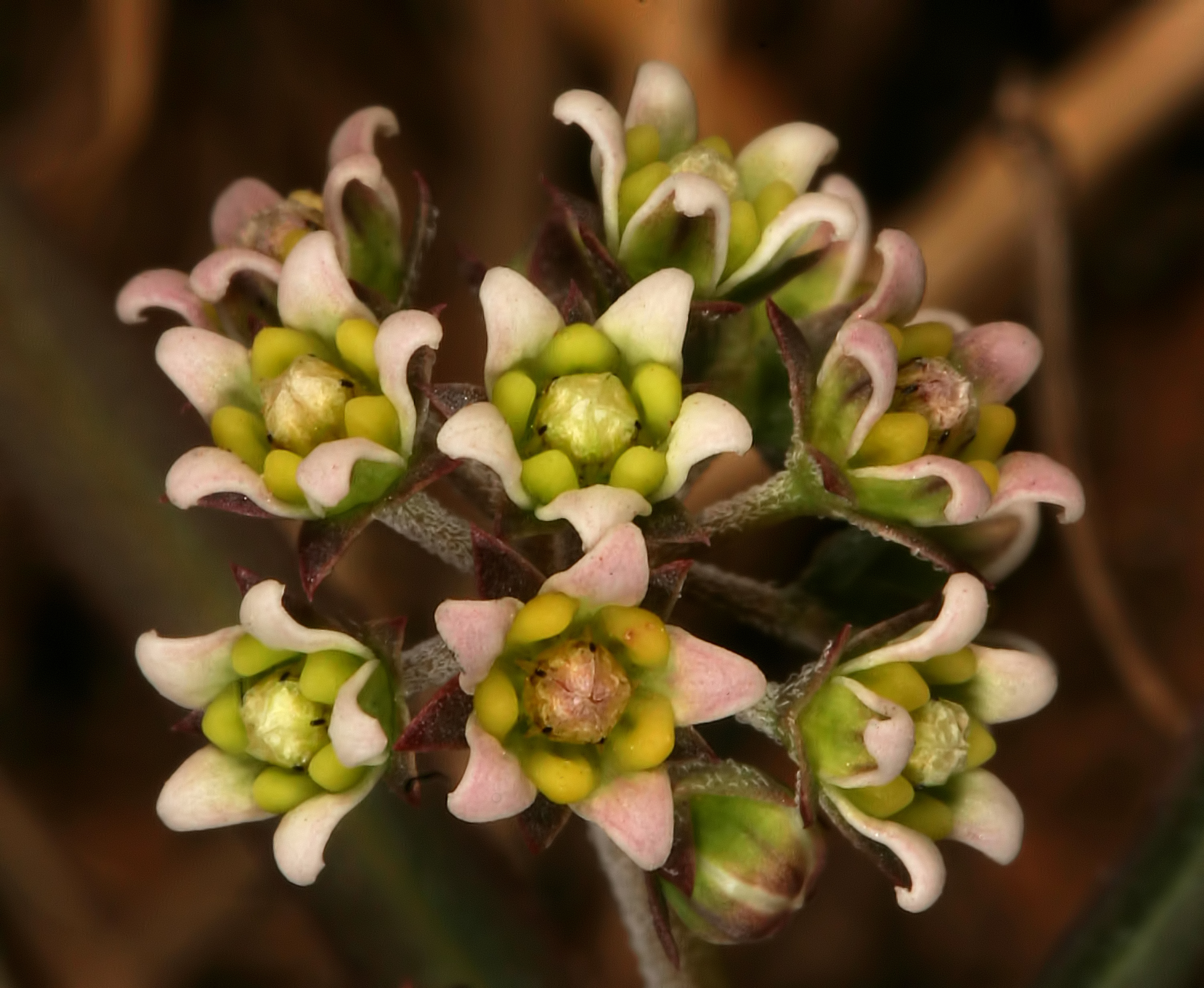
- Stenostelma umbelluliferum in South Africa

Scientific classification
- Kingdom: Plantae
- Clade: Tracheophytes
- Clade: Angiosperms
- Clade: Eudicots
- Clade: Asterids
- Order: Gentianales
- Family: Apocynaceae
- Subfamily: Asclepiadoideae
- Tribe: Asclepiadeae
- Genus: Stenostelma; Schltr. (1894)

Synonyms
- Krebsia Harv. (1868), nom. illeg.

= Stenostelma =

Genus of plants

Stenostelma is a genus of plants in the family Apocynaceae, first described as a genus in 1894. It is native to southern Africa, ranging from Mozambique, Zambia, and Namibia to South Africa.

Six species are accepted:

- Stenostelma capense Schltr. - South Africa (Cape Provinces, Free State, and Northern Provinces) to Botswana, Namibia, Zimbabwe, and Zambia
- Stenostelma corniculatum (E. Mey.) Bullock - South Africa, Lesotho, Eswatini, and Mozambique
- Stenostelma eustegioides (E.Mey.) Bester & Nicholas – Northern Provinces (Gauteng) to Free State and Cape Provinces
- Stenostelma ligulatum Bester & Nicholas – Northern Provinces of South Africa
- Stenostelma periglossoides (Schltr.) Bester & Nicholas – Free State, KwaZulu-Natal, and Northern Provinces of South Africa
- Stenostelma urceolatum Bester & Nicholas – KwaZulu Natal

formerly included

Stenostelma eminens (Harv.) Bullock, syn of Asclepias eminens (Harv.) Schltr.
