= Rojasia =

Scientific classification
- Kingdom: Plantae
- Clade: Tracheophytes
- Clade: Angiosperms
- Clade: Eudicots
- Clade: Asterids
- Order: Gentianales
- Family: Apocynaceae
- Subfamily: Asclepiadoideae
- Genus: Rojasia; Malme

Species
- See text.

Genus of plants

Rojasia is a group of plants in the family Apocynaceae first described as a genus in 1905. As of December 2022, Plants of the World Online accepted two species:

- Rojasia bornmuelleri (Schltr. ex Malme) Fontella, S.A.Cáceres & R.Santos
- Rojasia gracilis (Morong) Malme
