= Kerbera =

Scientific classification
- Kingdom: Plantae
- Clade: Tracheophytes
- Clade: Angiosperms
- Clade: Eudicots
- Clade: Asterids
- Order: Gentianales
- Family: Apocynaceae
- Tribe: Asclepiadeae
- Genus: Kerbera; E.Fourn.
- Species: K. eichleri

Binomial name
- Kerbera eichleri E.Fourn.

Synonyms
- Melinia eichleri (E.Fourn.) K.Schum.

Genus of plants

Kerbera is a genus of plants in the family Apocynaceae first established in 1885. It contains only one known species, Kerbera eichleri, endemic to Brazil (the states of Minas Gerais and Rio de Janeiro).

Some sources treat Kerbera as a synonym of Melinia, which may in turn treated as a synonym of Philibertia.
