= Glossostelma =

Scientific classification
- Kingdom: Plantae
- Clade: Tracheophytes
- Clade: Angiosperms
- Clade: Eudicots
- Clade: Asterids
- Order: Gentianales
- Family: Apocynaceae
- Subfamily: Asclepiadoideae
- Tribe: Asclepiadeae
- Genus: Glossostelma; Schltr.

Type species
- Glossostelma angolense Schltr.

Genus of flowering plants

Glossostelma is a plant genus in the family Apocynaceae, first described as a genus in 1895. It is native to Africa .

Species

1. Glossostelma angolense Schltr. - Angola
2. Glossostelma brevilobum Goyder - Zaïre, Burundi, Tanzania, Malawi
3. Glossostelma cabrae (De Wild.) Goyder - Zaïre
4. Glossostelma carsonii (N.E.Br.) Bullock - Gabon
5. Glossostelma ceciliae (N.E.Br.) Goyder - Zimbabwe, Mozambique
6. Glossostelma erectum (De Wild.) Goyder - Zaïre
7. Glossostelma lisianthoides (Decne.) Bullock - Angola
8. Glossostelma mbisiense Goyder - Tanzania
9. Glossostelma nyikense Goyder - Malawi, Zambia
10. Glossostelma rusapense Goyder - Zimbabwe
11. Glossostelma spathulatum (K.Schum.) Bullock - Angola
12. Glossostelma xysmalobioides (S.Moore) Bullock - Angola
