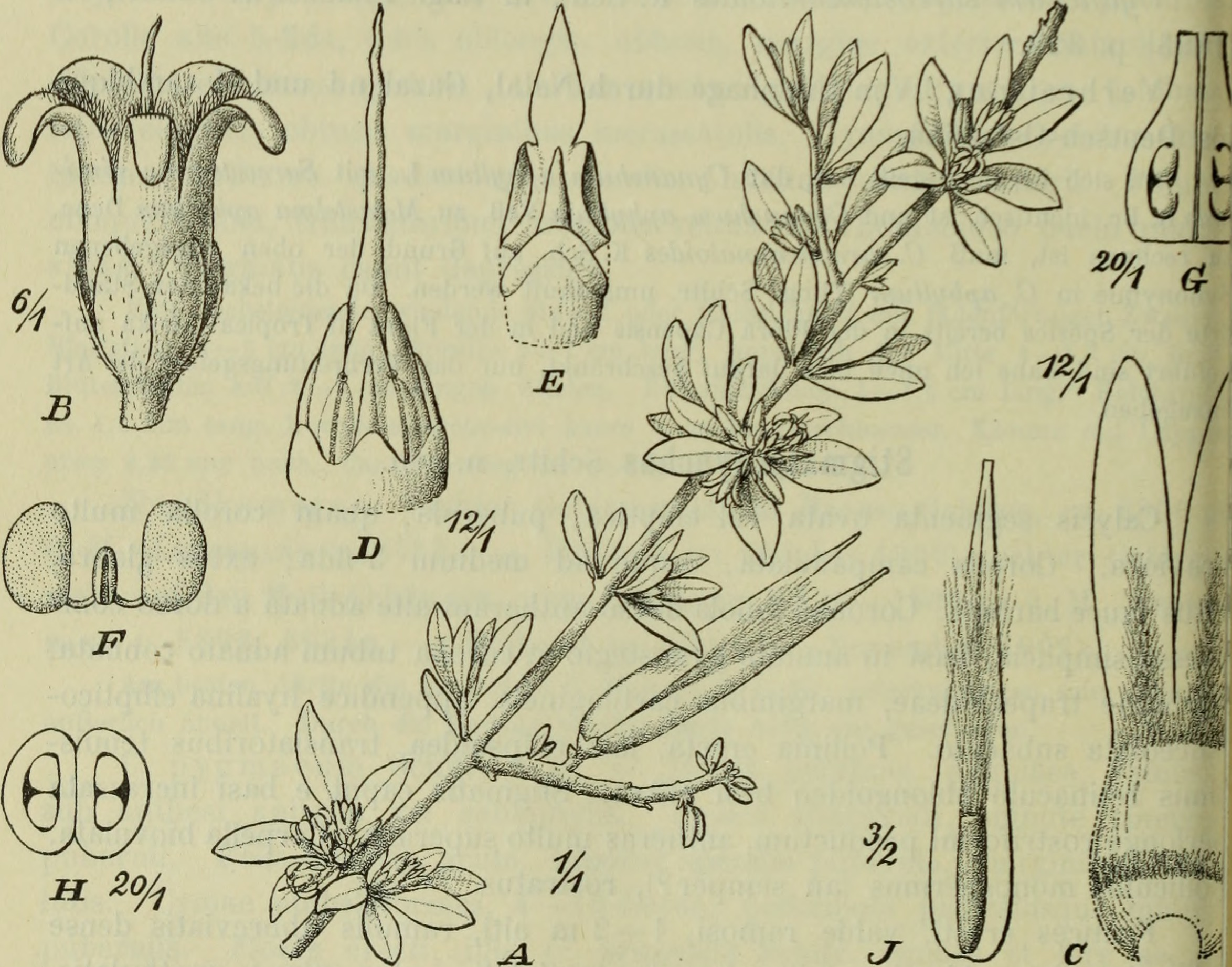
- Stimatorhynchus hereroensis

Scientific classification
- Kingdom: Plantae
- Clade: Tracheophytes
- Clade: Angiosperms
- Clade: Eudicots
- Clade: Asterids
- Order: Gentianales
- Family: Apocynaceae
- Subfamily: Asclepiadoideae
- Tribe: Marsdenieae
- Genus: Stigmatorhynchus; Schltr.

= Stigmatorhynchus =

Genus of plants

Stigmatorhynchus is a genus of plants in the Apocynaceae, first described as a genus in 1913. It is native to Africa.

Species

1. Stigmatorhynchus hereroensis Schltr. - Damaraland region of Namibia
2. Stigmatorhynchus steleostigma (K. Schum.) Schltr. - Somalia
3. Stigmatorhynchus umbelliferus (K. Schum.) Schltr. - Tanzania
