= Dalzielia =

Scientific classification
- Kingdom: Plantae
- Clade: Tracheophytes
- Clade: Angiosperms
- Clade: Eudicots
- Clade: Asterids
- Order: Gentianales
- Family: Apocynaceae
- Subfamily: Asclepiadoideae
- Tribe: Marsdenieae
- Genus: Dalzielia; Turrill
- Species: D. oblanceolata

Binomial name
- Dalzielia oblanceolata Turrill

Synonyms
- Marsdenia oblanceolata (Turrill) Omlor; Xysmalobium graniticola A.Chev., nom. nud.

Genus of flowering plants

Dalzielia is a genus of plants in the Apocynaceae first described as a genus in 1922. It contains only one known species, Dalzielia oblanceolata, native to tropical West Africa.
