= Monsanima =

Scientific classification
- Kingdom: Plantae
- Clade: Tracheophytes
- Clade: Angiosperms
- Clade: Eudicots
- Clade: Asterids
- Order: Gentianales
- Family: Apocynaceae
- Subfamily: Asclepiadoideae
- Tribe: Asclepiadeae
- Genus: Monsanima; Liede & Meve

Genus of plants

Monsanima is a genus of flowering plants belonging to the family Apocynaceae.

Its native range is Eastern Brazil.

Species:

- Monsanima morrenioides (Goyder) Liede & Meve
- Monsanima tinguaensis R.Santos & Fontella
