= Petalostelma =

Scientific classification
- Kingdom: Plantae
- Clade: Tracheophytes
- Clade: Angiosperms
- Clade: Eudicots
- Clade: Asterids
- Order: Gentianales
- Family: Apocynaceae
- Subfamily: Asclepiadoideae
- Tribe: Asclepiadeae
- Genus: Petalostelma; E.Fourn.

Type species
- Petalostelma martianum (Decne.) E.Fourn.

Synonyms
- Lagoa T.Durand; Zygostelma E.Fourn.

Genus of flowering plants

Petalostelma is a genus of flowering plants in the family Apocynaceae, first described as a genus in 1885. They are native to South America.

Species

1. Petalostelma bracteolatum (E.Fourn.) Fontella - Rio de Janeiro
2. Petalostelma calcaratum (Decne.) Fontella - Brazil
3. Petalostelma cearense Malme - Ceará
4. Petalostelma dardanoi Fontella - Pernambuco
5. Petalostelma martianum (Decne.) E.Fourn. - Brazil
6. Petalostelma robertii (S.Moore) Liede & Meve - Matto Grosso
7. Petalostelma sarcostemma (Lillo) Liede & Meve - Salta in Argentina, Chuquisaca in Bolivia
