= Hypolobus =

Scientific classification
- Kingdom: Plantae
- Clade: Tracheophytes
- Clade: Angiosperms
- Clade: Eudicots
- Clade: Asterids
- Order: Gentianales
- Family: Apocynaceae
- Subfamily: Asclepiadoideae
- Tribe: Asclepiadeae
- Genus: Hypolobus; E.Fourn.
- Species: H. infractus

Binomial name
- Hypolobus infractus E.Fourn.

Genus of plants

Hypolobus is a species of plants in the family Apocynaceae first described as a genus in 1885. It contains only one known species, Hypolobus infractus, endemic to the State of Bahia in Brazil.
