= Emicocarpus =

Conservation status
- Critically endangered, possibly extinct (IUCN 3.1)

Scientific classification
- Kingdom: Plantae
- Clade: Tracheophytes
- Clade: Angiosperms
- Clade: Eudicots
- Clade: Asterids
- Order: Gentianales
- Family: Apocynaceae
- Subfamily: Asclepiadoideae
- Tribe: Eustegieae
- Genus: Emicocarpus; K.Schum. & Schltr.
- Species: E. fissifolius

Binomial name
- Emicocarpus fissifolius K.Schum. & Schltr.

Genus of flowering plants

Emicocarpus is a species of plants in the family Apocynaceae first described as a genus in 1900. It contains only one known species, Emicocarpus fissifolius, native to tropical Africa.
