= Stelmagonum =

Scientific classification
- Kingdom: Plantae
- Clade: Tracheophytes
- Clade: Angiosperms
- Clade: Eudicots
- Clade: Asterids
- Order: Gentianales
- Family: Apocynaceae
- Subfamily: Asclepiadoideae
- Tribe: Asclepiadeae
- Genus: Stelmagonum; Baill.
- Species: S. hahnianum

Binomial name
- Stelmagonum hahnianum Baill.

Genus of plants

Stelmagonum hahnianum is a species of flowering plants belonging to the family Apocynaceae. It is the sole representative of the genus Stelmagonum.

Its native range is Southwestern Mexico. Ibatia holtonii was once placed in the genus as Stelmagonum holtonii.
