= Tylodontia =

Scientific classification
- Kingdom: Plantae
- Clade: Tracheophytes
- Clade: Angiosperms
- Clade: Eudicots
- Clade: Asterids
- Order: Gentianales
- Family: Apocynaceae
- Subfamily: Asclepiadoideae
- Tribe: Asclepiadeae
- Genus: Tylodontia; Griseb.

Genus of flowering plants

Tylodontia is a genus of flowering plants belonging to the family Apocynaceae.

Its native range is Cuba.

Species:

- Tylodontia cubensis Griseb.
- Tylodontia fuscula (C.Wright) Mangelsdorff, Meve & Liede
- Tylodontia stipitata Mangelsdorff, Meve & Liede
- Tylodontia urceolata (Griseb.) Mangelsdorff, Meve & Liede
