= Papuahoya =

Scientific classification
- Kingdom: Plantae
- Clade: Tracheophytes
- Clade: Angiosperms
- Clade: Eudicots
- Clade: Asterids
- Order: Gentianales
- Family: Apocynaceae
- Genus: Papuahoya; Rodda & Simonsson (2020)

Species
- Papuahoya bykulleana Simonsson & Rodda; Papuahoya neoguineensis Simonsson & Rodda; Papuahoya urniflora (P.I.Forst.) Rodda & Simonsson

Genus of flowering plants

Papuahoya is a genus of flowering plants in the family Apocynaceae. It includes three species endemic to New Guinea.

- Papuahoya bykulleana Simonsson & Rodda
- Papuahoya neoguineensis Simonsson & Rodda
- Papuahoya urniflora (P.I.Forst.) Rodda & Simonsson
