= Minaria =

Scientific classification
- Kingdom: Plantae
- Clade: Tracheophytes
- Clade: Angiosperms
- Clade: Eudicots
- Clade: Asterids
- Order: Gentianales
- Family: Apocynaceae
- Subfamily: Asclepiadoideae
- Tribe: Asclepiadeae
- Genus: Minaria; T.U.P.Konno & Rapini

Genus of flowering plants

Minaria is a genus of flowering plants in the family Apocynaceae, first described as a genus in 2006. They are native to Brazil and Bolivia in South America.

Species

1. Minaria abortiva (E.Fourn.) Rapini - Serra da Capivary in São Paulo
2. Minaria acerosa (Mart.) T.U.P.Konno & Rapini - Brazil, Bolivia
3. Minaria bifurcata (Rapini) T.U.P.Konno & Rapini - Minas Gerais
4. Minaria campanuliflora Rapini - Minas Gerais
5. Minaria cordata (Turcz.) T.U.P.Konno & Rapini - Brazil, Bolivia
6. Minaria decussata (Mart.) T.U.P.Konno & Rapini - Brazil
7. Minaria diamantinensis (Fontella) T.U.P.Konno & Rapini - Minas Gerais
8. Minaria ditassoides (Silveira) T.U.P.Konno & Rapini - Minas Gerais
9. Minaria grazielae (Fontella & Marquete) T.U.P.Konno & Rapini - Minas Gerais
10. Minaria harleyi (Fontella & Marquete) Rapini & U.C.S. Silva - Bahia
11. Minaria hemipogonoides (E.Fourn.) T.U.P.Konno & Rapini - Brazil
12. Minaria inconspicua (Rapini) Rapini - Minas Gerais
13. Minaria lourteigiae (Fontella) T.U.P.Konno & Rapini - Minas Gerais
14. Minaria magisteriana (Rapini) T.U.P.Konno & Rapini - Minas Gerais
15. Minaria micromeria (Decne.) T.U.P.Konno & Rapini - Brazil
16. Minaria monocoronata (Rapini) T.U.P.Konno & Rapini - Minas Gerais
17. Minaria parva (Silveira) T.U.P.Konno & Rapini - Minas Gerais
18. Minaria polygaloides (Silveira) T.U.P.Konno & Rapini - Minas Gerais
19. Minaria praetermissa W.D.Stevens & Arbeláez - Santa Cruz region in Bolivia
20. Minaria refractifolia (K.Schum.) T.U.P.Konno & Rapini - Brazil
21. Minaria semirii (Fontella) T.U.P.Konno & Rapini - Minas Gerais
22. Minaria volubilis Rapini & U.C.S. Silva - Bahia
