= Sicyocarpus =

Scientific classification
- Kingdom: Plantae
- Clade: Tracheophytes
- Clade: Angiosperms
- Clade: Eudicots
- Clade: Asterids
- Order: Gentianales
- Family: Apocynaceae
- Genus: Sicyocarpus; Bojer (1837)

Species
- Sicyocarpus cordifolius (Choux) S.Reuss, Liede & Meve; Sicyocarpus verrucosus Bojer

Genus of flowering plants

Sicyocarpus is a genus of flowering plants in family Apocynaceae. It includes two species native to Madagascar.

- Sicyocarpus cordifolius (Choux) S.Reuss, Liede & Meve
- Sicyocarpus verrucosus Bojer
