= Gongronemopsis =

Scientific classification
- Kingdom: Plantae
- Clade: Tracheophytes
- Clade: Angiosperms
- Clade: Eudicots
- Clade: Asterids
- Order: Gentianales
- Family: Apocynaceae
- Genus: Gongronemopsis; S.Reuss, Liede & Meve (2022)

Species
- 9; see text

Genus of plants

Gongronemopsis is a genus of flowering plants in the dogbane family, Apocynaceae. It includes nine species native to tropical Africa and Madagascar, the Indian subcontinent, Indochina, southern China, and the Philippines.

- Gongronemopsis angolensis (N.E.Br.) S.Reuss, Liede & Meve
- Gongronemopsis calesiana (Wight) S.Reuss, Liede & Meve
- Gongronemopsis cavalieri (H.Lév.) S.Reuss, Liede & Meve
- Gongronemopsis gazensis (S.Moore) S.Reuss, Liede & Meve
- Gongronemopsis latifolia (Benth.) S.Reuss, Liede & Meve
- Gongronemopsis obscura (Bullock) S.Reuss, Liede & Meve
- Gongronemopsis philippinensis (Schltr.) S.Reuss, Liede & Meve
- Gongronemopsis tenacissima (Roxb.) S.Reuss, Liede & Meve
- Gongronemopsis truncata (Jum. & H.Perrier) S.Reuss, Liede & Meve
