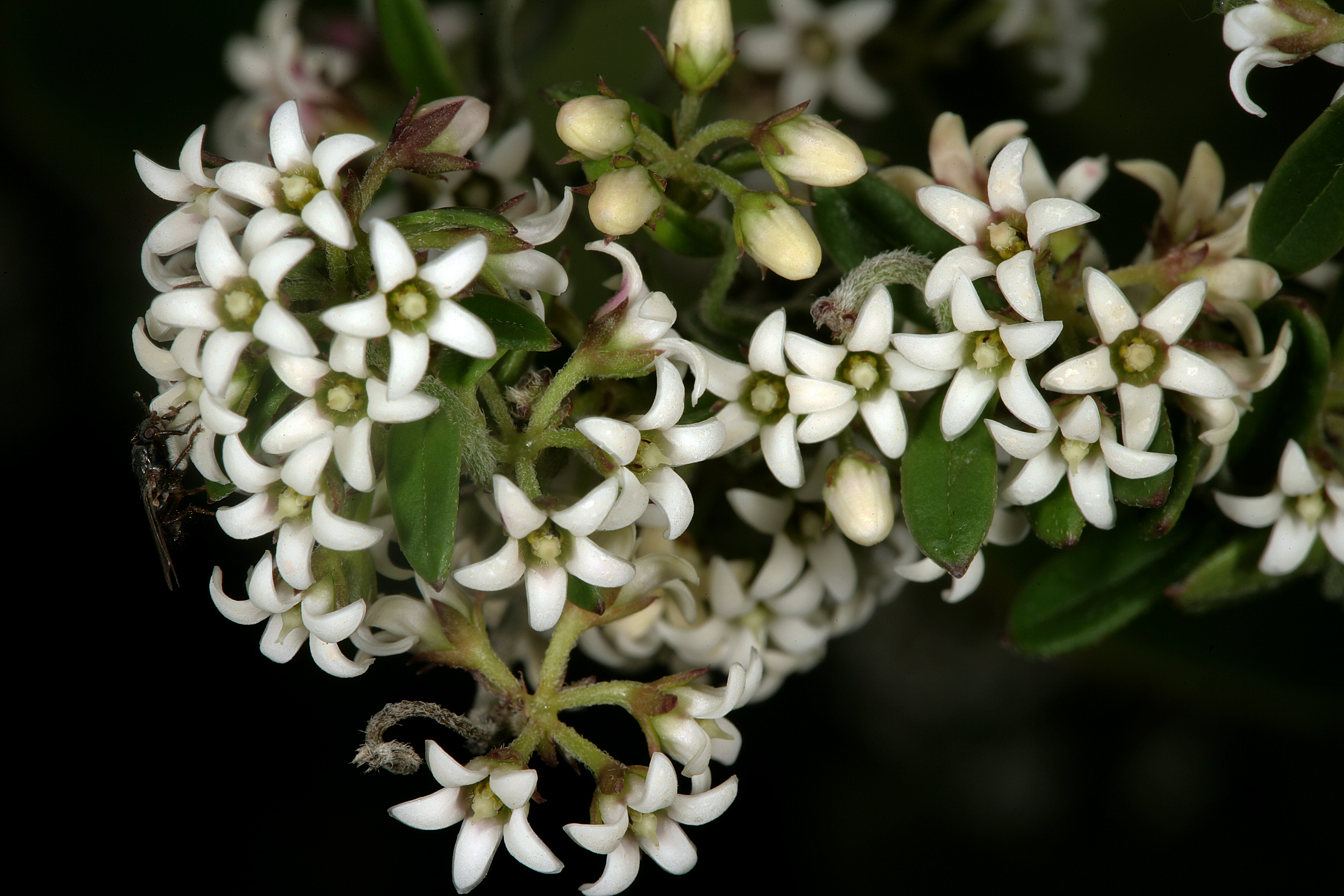
- Astephanus triflorus

Scientific classification
- Kingdom: Plantae
- Clade: Embryophytes
- Clade: Tracheophytes
- Clade: Spermatophytes
- Clade: Angiosperms
- Clade: Eudicots
- Clade: Asterids
- Order: Gentianales
- Family: Apocynaceae
- Subfamily: Asclepiadoideae
- Tribe: Asclepiadeae
- Genus: Astephanus; R.Br.

= Astephanus =

Genus of flowering plants

Astephanus is a genus of flowering plants in the family Apocynaceae, first described as a genus in 1810.

Species

The Plant List maintained by the Kew Gardens in London currently (September 2014) lists 53 species names that have been placed in the genus Astephanus since 1810. The majority of these are categorized as "unresolved," meaning that the appropriate classification is still open to debate. Only the following 3 are listed as "accepted."

1. Astephanus geminiflorus Decne. - Chile
2. Astephanus triflorus (L.f.) R.Br. - South Africa
3. Astephanus zeyheri Turcz. - South Africa
