= Gongreos =

Scientific classification
- Kingdom: Plantae
- Clade: Tracheophytes
- Clade: Angiosperms
- Clade: Eudicots
- Clade: Asterids
- Order: Gentianales
- Family: Apocynaceae
- Genus: Gongreos; Rodda, Liede & Meve (2022)

Species
- Gongreos filipes (Kerr) Rodda, Liede & Meve; Gongreos wallichii (Wight) Rodda, Liede & Meve

Genus of plants

Gongreos is a genus of flowering plants in the dogbane family, Apocynaceae. It includes two species of climbing shrubs or subshrubs native to tropical Asia, including Nepal, southern China, Thailand, Peninsular Malaysia, and Borneo.

- Gongreos filipes (Kerr) Rodda, Liede & Meve – southern China (Guangxi and southwestern Yunnan) and northern Thailand.
- Gongreos wallichii (Wight) Rodda, Liede & Meve – Nepal, Peninsular Malaysia, and Borneo
