= Hemipogon (plant) =

Scientific classification
- Kingdom: Plantae
- Clade: Tracheophytes
- Clade: Angiosperms
- Clade: Eudicots
- Clade: Asterids
- Order: Gentianales
- Family: Apocynaceae
- Subfamily: Asclepiadoideae
- Tribe: Asclepiadeae
- Genus: Hemipogon; Decne.

Genus of flowering plants

Hemipogon is a genus of flowering plants in the family Apocynaceae, first described as a genus in 1844. It is native to South America.

Species

1. Hemipogon abietoides E.Fourn. - Minas Gerais
2. Hemipogon acerosa Decne. - Brazil
3. Hemipogon carassensis (Malme) Rapini - Minas Geraes
4. Hemipogon furlanii (Fontella) Rapini - Minas Gerais
5. Hemipogon harleyi (Fontella) Goyder - Bahia
6. Hemipogon hatschbachii (Fontella & Marquete) Rapini - Minas Geraes
7. Hemipogon hemipogonoides (Malme) Rapini - Ecuador
8. Hemipogon irwinii Fontella & Paixao - Goiás
9. Hemipogon luteus E. Fourn. - Minas Gerais
10. Hemipogon peruvianus E. Fourn. - Peru
11. Hemipogon piranii (Fontella) Rapini - Minas Gerais
12. Hemipogon setaceus Decne. - Goiás

formerly included

transferred to Astephanus

1. Hemipogon exaltatus synonym of Astephanus sprucei
2. Hemipogon laxifolius synonym of Astephanus luteus
3. Hemipogon sprucei synonym of Astephanus sprucei
4. Hemipogon williamsii synonym of Astephanus sprucei
