= Pentasacme =

Scientific classification
- Kingdom: Plantae
- Clade: Tracheophytes
- Clade: Angiosperms
- Clade: Eudicots
- Clade: Asterids
- Order: Gentianales
- Family: Apocynaceae
- Genus: Pentasacme; Wall. ex Wight (1834)

Synonyms
- Spiladocorys Ridl. (1893)

Genus of flowering plants

Pentasacme, sometimes spelled Pentasachme, is a genus of flowering plants in the dogbane family (Apocynaceae). It contains six species which range from the Himalayas through Indochina to southern China and Peninsular Malaysia. The genus was first described in 1834.

== Species ==
- Pentasacme caudatum Wall. ex Wight – Nepal through Indochina to southern China and Peninsular Malaysia
- Pentasacme malipoense C.Liu & Y.H.Tan – China (Yunnan)
- Pentasacme pulcherrima Grierson & D.G.Long – Nepal and southern Bhutan
- Pentasacme shanense R.W.MacGregor & W.W.Sm. – Myanmar
- Pentasacme tubulosum C.Liu, X.J.Hu & Y.H.Tan – China (Yunnan)
- Pentasacme wallichii Wight – Himalayas to Bangladesh

=== Formerly included ===
moved to other genera (Cynanchum, Heterostemma):

- P. brachyantha now Cynanchum stauntonii
- P. esquirolii now Heterostemma esquirolii
- P. glaucescens now Cynanchum glaucescens
- P. stauntonii now Cynanchum stauntonii
