= List of subfamilies and genera of Apocynaceae =

This is a list of subfamilies and genera of the dogbane family Apocynaceae. A list of synonyms for the various genera is given here, together with supporting references.

== Subfamilies ==
Apocynoideae and Rauvolfioideae are part of Apocynaceae sensu stricto, whilst the other three subfamilies belong to the former Asclepiadaceae.

- Apocynoideae
- Asclepiadoideae
- Periplocoideae
- Rauvolfioideae
- Secamonoideae

== Genera ==
380 genera are currently accepted.

=== A ===
- Acokanthera G.Don
- Acomosperma K.Schum. ex Ule
- Adenium Roem. & Schult.
- Aganosma (Blume) G.Don
- Alafia Thouars
- Allamanda L.
- Allomarkgrafia Woodson
- Allowoodsonia Markgr.
- Alstonia R.Br.
- Alyxia R.Br.
- Amalocalyx Pierre
- Ambelania Aubl.
- Amphineurion (A.DC.) Pichon
- Amsonia Walter
- Ancylobothrys Pierre
- Anechites Griseb.
- Anemotrochus Mangelsdorff, Meve & Liede
- Angadenia Miers
- Anisopus N.E.Br.
- Anisotoma Fenzl
- Anodendron A.DC.
- Apocynum L.
- Apteranthes J.C.Mikan
- Araujia Brot.
- Artia Guillaumin
- Asclepias L.
- Asketanthera Woodson
- Aspidoglossum E.Mey.
- Aspidonepsis Nicholas & Goyder
- Aspidosperma Mart. & Zucc.
- Astephanus R.Br.
- Asterostemma Decne.
- Atherandra Decne.
- Atrostemma Morillo
- Australluma Plowes
- Austrochthamalia Morillo & Fontella

=== B ===
- Baharuia D.J.Middleton
- Bahiella J.F.Morales
- Baissea A.DC.
- Ballyanthus Bruyns
- Barjonia Decne.
- Baroniella Costantin & Gallaud
- Baseonema Schltr. & Rendle
- Batesanthus N.E.Br.
- Baynesia Bruyns
- Beaumontia Wall.
- Blepharodon Decne.
- Boucerosia Wight & Arn.
- Bousigonia Pierre
- Brachystelma R.Br. – synonym of Ceropegia
- Brargentina Morillo & H.A.Keller
- Bruceholstia Morillo
- Buckollia Venter & R.L.Verh.

=== C ===
- Caa H.A.Keller & Liede
- Calciphila Liede & Meve
- Callichilia Stapf
- Calocrater K.Schum.
- Calotropis R.Br.
- Calyptranthera Klack.
- Cameraria L.
- Campestigma Pierre ex Costantin
- Camptocarpus Decne.
- Caralluma R.Br.
- Carissa L.
- Carruthersia Seem.
- Carvalhoa K.Schum.
- Cascabela Raf.
- Catharanthus G.Don
- Caudanthera Plowes
- Cerbera L.
- Cerberiopsis Vieill. ex Pancher & Sebert
- Ceropegia L.
- Chamaeclitandra (Stapf) Pichon
- Chilocarpus Blume
- Chlorocyathus Oliv.
- Chloropetalum Morillo
- Chonemorpha G.Don
- Chthamalia Decne.
- Cibirhiza Bruyns
- Cionura Griseb.
- Cleghornia Wight
- Clitandra Benth.
- Condylocarpon Desf.
- Conomitra Fenzl
- Cordylogyne E.Mey.
- Cosmostigma Wight
- Couma Aubl.
- Craspidospermum Bojer ex A.DC.
- Crioceras Pierre
- Cristobalia Morillo, S.A.Cáceres & H.A.Keller
- Cryptolepis R.Br.
- Cryptostegia R.Br.
- Cycladenia Benth.
- Cyclocotyla Stapf
- Cylindropsis Pierre
- Cynanchum L.

=== D ===
- Dalzielia Turrill
- Decalepis Wight & Arn.
- Decanema Decne.
- Desmidorchis Ehrenb.
- Dewevrella De Wild.
- Dictyanthus Decne.
- Dictyophleba Pierre
- Diplolepis R.Br.
- Diplorhynchus Welw. ex Ficalho & Hiern
- Dischidanthus Tsiang
- Dischidia R.Br.
- Ditassa R.Br.
- Dolichopetalum Tsiang
- Duvalia Haw.
- Duvaliandra M.G.Gilbert
- × Duvaliaranthus Bruyns
- Dyera Hook.f.

=== E ===
- Echidnopsis Hook.f.
- Echites P.Browne
- Ectadium E.Mey.
- Ecua D.J.Middleton
- Edithcolea N.E.Br.
- Elytropus Müll.Arg.
- Emicocarpus K.Schum. & Schltr.
- Emplectanthus N.E.Br.
- Ephippiocarpa Markgr.
- Epigynum Wight
- Epistemma D.V.Field & J.B.Hall
- Eucorymbia Stapf
- Eustegia R.Br.

=== F ===
- Fanninia Harv.
- Farquharia Stapf
- Finlaysonia Wall.
- Fischeria DC.
- Fockea Endl.
- Forsteronia G.Mey.
- Funastrum E.Fourn.
- Funtumia Stapf

=== G ===
- Galactophora Woodson
- Geissospermum Allemão
- Genianthus Hook.f. – synonym of Secamone R.Br.
- Glossostelma Schltr.
- Gomphocarpus R.Br.
- Gongreos Rodda, Liede & Meve
- Gongronema (Endl.) Decne.
- Gongronemopsis S.Reuss, Liede & Meve
- Gonioma E.Mey.
- Goniostemma Wight
- Gonolobus Michx.
- Graciemoriana Morillo
- Gymnanthera R.Br.
- Gymnema R.Br.
- Gymnemopsis Costantin
- Gyrostelma E.Fourn.

=== H ===
- Hancornia Gomes
- Haplophyton A.DC.
- Harmandiella Costantin
- Hemidesmus R.Br.
- Hemipogon Decne.
- Heterostemma Wight & Arn.
- Heynella Backer
- Himatanthus Willd. ex Schult.
- Holarrhena R.Br.
- Hoodia Sweet ex Decne.
- × Hoodiapelia G.D.Rowley
- × Hoodiorbea G.D.Rowley
- × Hoodiotriche G.D.Rowley
- Hoya R.Br.
- Huernia R.Br.
- Hunteria Roxb.
- Hylaea J.F.Morales
- Hypolobus E.Fourn.

=== I ===
- Ibatia Decne.
- Ichnocarpus R.Br.
- Ischnolepis Jum. & H.Perrier
- Isonema R.Br.
- Ixodonerium Pit.

=== J ===
- Jasminanthes Blume
- Jobinia E.Fourn.

=== K ===
- Kamettia Kostel.
- Kanahia R.Br.
- Kerbera E.Fourn.
- Kibatalia G.Don
- Kopsia Blume

=== L ===
- Lachnostoma Kunth
- Lacmellea H.Karst.
- Landolphia P.Beauv.
- Larryleachia Plowes
- Laubertia A.DC.
- Lavrania Plowes
- Laxoplumeria Markgr.
- Leichhardtia R.Br.
- Lepinia Decne.
- Lepiniopsis Valenton
- Leptadenia R.Br.
- Leuconotis Jack
- Lygisma Hook.f.

=== M ===
- Maclaudia Venter & R.L.Verh.
- Macoubea Aubl.
- Macropharynx Rusby
- Macroscepis Kunth
- Mahawoa Schltr.
- Malouetia A.DC.
- Mandevilla Lindl.
- Manothrix Miers
- Margaretta Oliv.
- Marsdenia R.Br.
- Mascarenhasia A.DC.
- Matelea Aubl.
- Melodinus J.R.Forst. & G.Forst.
- Mesechites Müll.Arg.
- Metastelma R.Br.
- Meveampelos Morillo
- Micrechites Miq.
- Microloma R.Br.
- Microplumeria Baill.
- Microstelma Baill. ex Morillo
- Minaria T.U.P.Konno & Rapini
- Miraglossum Kupicha
- Molongum Pichon
- Mondia Skeels
- Monolluma Plowes
- Monsanima Liede & Meve
- Morilloa Fontella, Goes & S.A.Cáceres
- Mortoniella Woodson
- Motandra A.DC.
- Mucoa Zarucchi
- Myriopteron Griff.

=== N ===
- Nautonia Decne.
- Neobracea Britton
- Neocouma Pierre
- Neoschumannia Schltr.
- Nephradenia Decne.
- Nerium L.
- Notechidnopsis Lavranos & Bleck

=== O ===
- Ochrosia Juss.
- Odontadenia Benth.
- Odontostephana Alexander
- Oncinema Arn.
- Oncinotis Benth.
- Ophionella Bruyns
- Orbea Haw.
- × Orbelia G.D.Rowley
- Oreosparte Schltr.
- Orinoquia Morillo
- Orthanthera Wight – synonym of Leptadenia R.Br.
- Orthopichonia H.Huber
- Orthosia Decne.
- Oxypetalum R.Br.
- Oxystelma R.Br.

=== P ===
- Pachycarpus E.Mey.
- Pachypodium Lindl.
- Pacouria Aubl.
- Papuahoya Rodda & Simonsson
- Papuechites Markgr.
- Parahancornia Ducke
- Parapodium E.Mey.
- Parepigynum Tsiang & P.T.Li
- Parsonsia R.Br.
- Pattalias S.Watson
- Pectinaria Haw.
- Pentacyphus Schltr.
- Pentalinon Voigt
- Pentasacme Wall. ex Wight
- Pentatropis R.Br. ex Wight & Arn.
- Pentopetia Decne.
- Peplonia Decne.
- Pergularia L.
- Periglossum Decne.
- Periploca Tourn. ex L.
- Peruviasclepias Morillo
- Pervillaea Decne.
- Petalostelma E.Fourn.
- Petchia Livera
- Phaeostemma E.Fourn.
- Pherotrichis Decne.
- Philibertia Kunth
- Phyllanthera Blume
- Piaranthus R.Br.
- Picralima Pierre
- Pinochia M.E.Endress & B.F.Hansen
- Plectaneia Thouars
- Pleiocarpa Benth.
- Pleioceras Baill.
- Plumeria Tourn. ex L.
- Polystemma Decne.
- Pottsia Hook. & Arn.
- Prestonia R.Br.
- Pruskortizia Morillo
- Pseudolachnostoma Morillo
- Pseudolithos P.R.O.Bally
- Pseudosarcolobus Costantin
- Pteralyxia K.Schum.
- Ptycanthera Decne.
- Pycnobotrya Benth.
- Pycnorhachis Benth.

=== Q ===
- Quaqua N.E.Br.

=== R ===
- Raphionacme Harv.
- Rauvolfia Plum ex L.
- Rhabdadenia Müll.Arg.
- Rhazya Decne.
- Rhigospira Miers
- Rhodocalyx Müll.Arg.
- Rhyssolobium E.Mey.
- Rhytidocaulon P.R.O.Bally
- Rhytidostemma Morillo
- Richtersveldia Meve & Liede
- Riocreuxia Decne.
- Riparoampelos Morillo
- Rojasia Malme
- Rotundanthus Morillo
- Ruehssia H.Karst.

=== S ===
- Saba (Pichon) Pichon
- Sacleuxia Baill.
- Sarcolobus R.Br.
- Sarcorrhiza Bullock
- Schistonema Schltr.
- Schizoglossum E.Mey.
- Schizostephanus Hochst. ex Benth. & Hook.f.
- Schizozygia Baill.
- Schlechterella K.Schum.
- Schubertia Mart.
- Scyphostelma Baill.
- Secamone R.Br.
- Secamonopsis Jum.
- Secondatia A.DC.
- Sicyocarpus Bojer
- Sindechites Oliv.
- Sinomarsdenia P.T.Li & J.J.Chen
- Sisyranthus E.Mey.
- Skytanthus Meyen
- Socotrella Bruyns & A.G.Mill.
- Solenostemma Hayne
- Spirolobium Baill.
- Spongiosperma Zarucchi
- × Staparesia G.D.Rowley
- Stapelia L.
- Stapelianthus Choux ex A.C.White & B.Sloane
- Stapeliopsis Pillans
- × Stapvalia D.M.Cumming
- Stathmostelma K.Schum.
- Stelmagonum Baill.
- Stenostelma Schltr.
- Stephanostegia Baill.
- Stephanostema K.Schum.
- Stephanotis Thouars
- Stigmatorhynchus Schltr.
- Stipecoma Müll.Arg.
- Stomatostemma N.E.Br.
- Strempeliopsis Benth.
- Streptocaulon Wight & Arn.
- Streptoechites D.J.Middleton & Livsh.
- Strophanthus DC.
- Suberogerens Morillo

=== T ===
- Tabernaemontana Plum. ex L.
- Tabernanthe Baill.
- Tacazzea Decne.
- Talayotea L.O.Alvarado
- Tassadia Decne.
- Tavaresia Welw.
- Telectadium Baill.
- Telosma Coville
- Temnadenia Miers
- Tetragonocarpus Hassk.
- Thenardia Kunth
- Thevetia L.
- Thoreauea J.K.Williams
- Thyrsanthella (Baill.) Pichon
- Tintinnabularia Woodson
- Topea H.A.Keller
- Toxocarpus Wight & Arn.
- Trachelospermum Lem.
- Treutlera Hook.f.
- Trichosandra Decne.
- × Tridentapelia G.D.Rowley
- Tridentea Haw.
- Tromotriche Haw.
- Tweedia Hook. & Arn.
- Tylodontia Griseb.

=== U ===
- Urceola Roxb.
- Urostephanus B.L.Rob. & Greenm.

=== V ===
- Vahadenia Stapf
- Vailia Rusby
- Vallaris Burm.f.
- Vallesia Ruiz & Pav.
- Vinca L.
- Vincetoxicum Wolf
- Voacanga Thouars
- Vulcanoa Morillo

=== W ===
- White-sloanea Chiov.
- Willughbeia Roxb.
- Woodia Schltr.
- Wrightia R.Br.

=== X ===
- Xysmalobium R.Br.

=== Z ===
- Zygostelma Benth.
