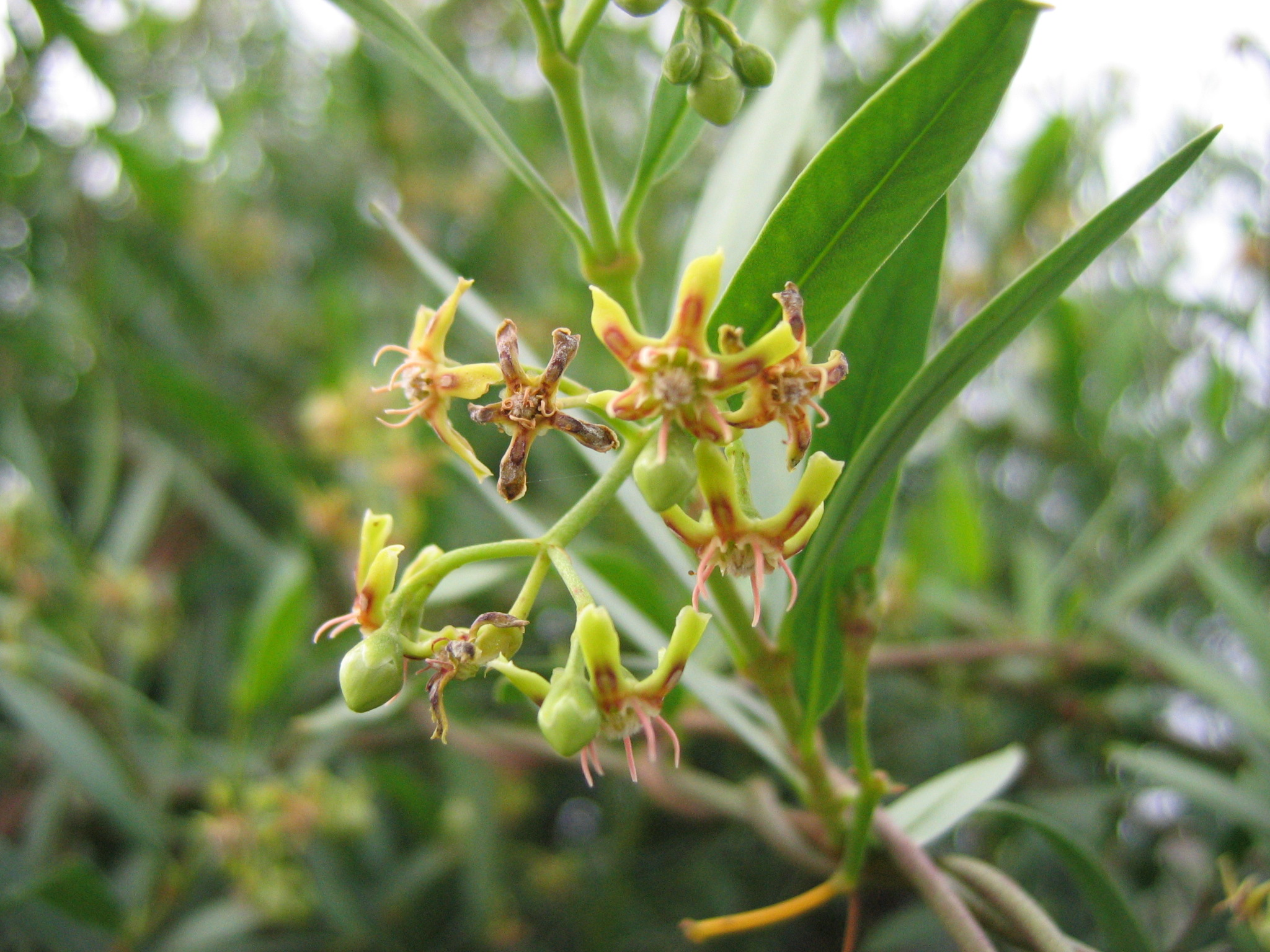
- Periploca laevigata flowers

Scientific classification
- Kingdom: Plantae
- Clade: Tracheophytes
- Clade: Angiosperms
- Clade: Eudicots
- Clade: Asterids
- Order: Gentianales
- Family: Apocynaceae
- Subfamily: Periplocoideae; Endl.

Genera
- See text

= Periplocoideae =

Subfamily of flowering plants

Periplocoideae is a subfamily of the dogbane plant family, Apocynaceae. It was not divided into tribes as of 2014. It was previously included in the family Asclepiadaceae before that family was split into three subfamilies, Asclepiadoideae, Periplocoideae and Secamonoideae and all were placed with the plants already included in the Apocynaceae, now the subfamilies Rauvolfioideae and Apocynoideae.

== Genera ==
In 2014, the subfamily was circumscribed to contain the following genera:

- Atherandra Decne.
- Baroniella Costantin & Gallaud
- Baseonema Schltr. & Rendle
- Batesanthus N.E.Br.
- Buckollia Venter & R.L.Verh.
- Camptocarpus Decne.
- Cryptolepis R.Br.
- Cryptostegia R.Br.
- Decalepis Wight & Arn.
- Ectadium E.Mey.
- Epistemma D.V.Field & J.B.Hall
- Finlaysonia Wall.
- Gymnanthera R.Br.
- Hemidesmus R.Br.
- Ischnolepis Jum. & H.Perrier
- Kappia Venter, A.P.Dold & R.L.Verh., syn. of Chlorocyathus Oliv.
- Maclaudia Venter & R.L.Verh.
- Mondia Skeels
- Myriopteron Griff.
- Parquetina Baill.
- Pentopetia Decne.
- Periploca L.
- Petopentia Bullock
- Phyllanthera Blume
- Raphionacme Harv.
- Sacleuxia Baill. (sometimes included in Cryptolepis)
- Sarcorrhiza Bullock
- Schlechterella K.Schum.
- Stomatostemma N.E. Br. (sometimes included in Cryptolepis)
- Streptocaulon Wight & Arn.
- Tacazzea Decne.
- Telectadium Baill.
- Zygostelma Benth.
