= Neoschumannia kamerunensis =

Conservation status
- Critically Endangered (IUCN 3.1)

Scientific classification
- Kingdom: Plantae
- Clade: Tracheophytes
- Clade: Angiosperms
- Clade: Eudicots
- Clade: Asterids
- Order: Gentianales
- Family: Apocynaceae
- Genus: Neoschumannia
- Species: N. kamerunensis

Binomial name
- Neoschumannia kamerunensis Schltr.

Species of plant

Neoschumannia kamerunensis is a species of plant in the family Apocynaceae. It is found in Cameroon, Central African Republic, and Ivory Coast. Its natural habitat is subtropical or tropical moist lowland forests. It is threatened by habitat loss.
