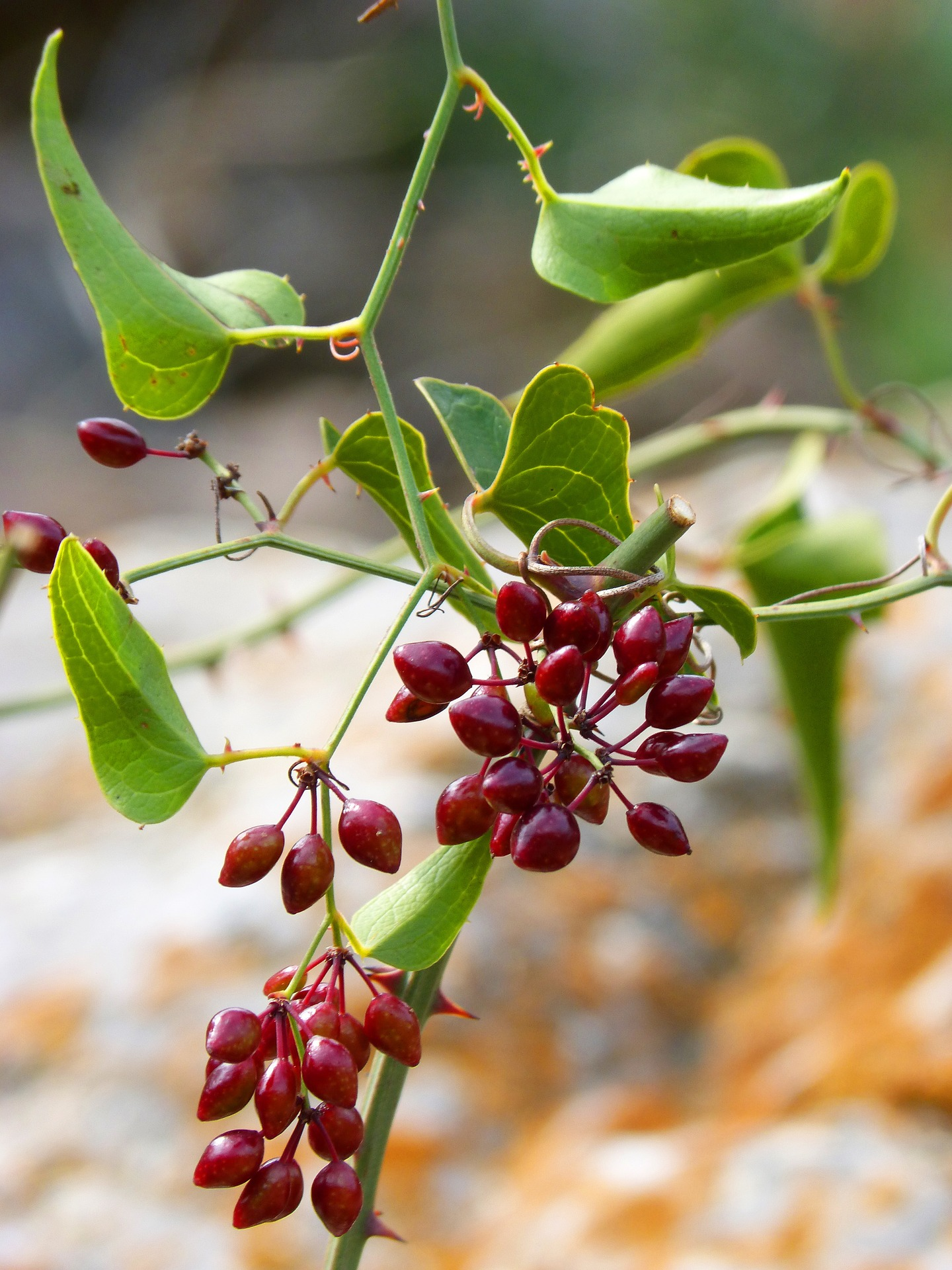

Scientific classification
- Kingdom: Plantae
- Clade: Tracheophytes
- Clade: Angiosperms
- Clade: Monocots
- Order: Liliales
- Family: Smilacaceae
- Genus: Smilax
- Species: S. ornata

Binomial name
- Smilax ornata Lem.

Synonyms
- Smilax grandifolia Regel 1856, not Buckley 1843 nor Voigt 1845 nor Poepp. ex A. DC. 1878; Smilax ornata Hook. 1889 not Lem. 1865; Smilax regelii Killip & C.V.Morton; Smilax utilis Hemsl. 1899, not C.H. Wright 1895

= Smilax ornata =

Species of flowering plant

Smilax ornata is a perennial trailing vine with prickly stems that is native to Mexico and Central America. Common names include sarsaparilla, Honduran sarsaparilla, and Jamaican sarsaparilla.

It is known in Spanish as zarzaparrilla, which is derived from the words zarza meaning "bramble" (from Basque sartzia "bramble"), and parrilla, meaning "little grape vine".

== Uses ==
=== Food ===
Smilax ornata is used as the basis for a soft drink known as sarsaparilla. It is also a primary ingredient in old fashioned-style licorice, in conjunction with sassafras, which was more widely available prior to studies of its potential health risks.

=== Traditional medicine ===
Smilax ornata was considered by Native Americans to have medicinal properties, and was a popular European treatment for syphilis when it was introduced from the New World. In Guatemala, Smilax ornata was used in traditional medicine as a decoction of the roots. From 1820 to 1910, it was registered in the U.S. Pharmacopoeia as a treatment for syphilis.

== Chemical constituents gallery ==
Triterpenes, a constituent of sarsaparilla

Sarsaparilloside, a constituent of sarsaparilla

Sarsaparilla R1, a constituent of sarsaparilla

Sarsaparilla R2, a constituent of sarsaparilla

Parillin, a constituent of sarsaparilla

== See also ==
- Hemidesmus indicus, Indian sarsaparilla
- Aralia nudicaulis, wild sarsaparilla or false sarsaparilla
- Sweet sarsaparilla (Smilax glyciphylla), a vine native to eastern Australia
