= Heterostemma maculatum =

Scientific classification
- Kingdom: Plantae
- Clade: Tracheophytes
- Clade: Angiosperms
- Clade: Eudicots
- Clade: Asterids
- Order: Gentianales
- Family: Apocynaceae
- Genus: Heterostemma
- Species: H. maculatum

Binomial name
- Heterostemma maculatum (Kerr) Rodda

Synonyms
- Dittocerus maculatum Kerr

Species of flowering plant

Heterostemma maculatum is a species of flowering plant in the family Apocynaceae. It is a climbing shrub which can be found in certain regions of Thailand and parts of west central Myanmar, specifically in mountainous tropical regions.
