= Charles Sacleux =

French missionary and linguist

Charles Sacleux CSSp
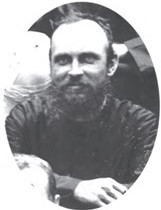
- Sacleux in 1897

Personal life
- Born: 5 July 1856 Enquin, France
- Died: 16 May 1943 (aged 86) Grasse, France

Religious life
- Religion: Roman Catholic
- Order: Spiritans
- Ordination: 1878

Charles Joseph Sacleux, CSSp (1856–1943) was a French Catholic missionary and linguist. He is known also as a botanist, having collected a herbarium of over 2,000 plants in East Africa and Zanzibar.

== Life ==
Sacleux was born on 5 July 1856 in Enquin, Pas-de-Calais in northern France, the second of three sons born to Auguste Sacleux, who died when he was five, and his wife, Marie Firmine Bayart. Charles joined the junior seminary at Arras in 1869 before spending a year at senior seminary beginning in 1874. He joined the Holy Ghost Fathers in 1875 and was ordained a priest in 1878.

Sacleux went to Zanzibar in 1879 and was posted to Bagamoyo and began studying Swahili in depth. He spent almost twenty years on the East African coast. Sacleux's work on Swahili is notable for being one of the few accounts of Swahili prior to its standardization and the influence of English.

In 1898, he returned to France, and took a teaching position in Chevilly. He died in Grasse on 16 May 1943.

In 1890, the botanist Henri Ernest Baillon published Sacleuxia, a genus of flowering plants from Kenya and Tanzania, in the family Apocynaceae and named in Charles Sacleux's honor.

== Works ==
Sacleux wrote:

- Essai de phonétique avec son application à l'étude des idiomes' (1905)
- Grammaire des dialectes swahilis (1909)
- Dictionnaire swahili-français (1939). Online version (open access)

His dictionary of the Comorian language was published in 1979 in two volumes by Mohamed Ahmed Chamanga and Noël Jacques Gueunier.
