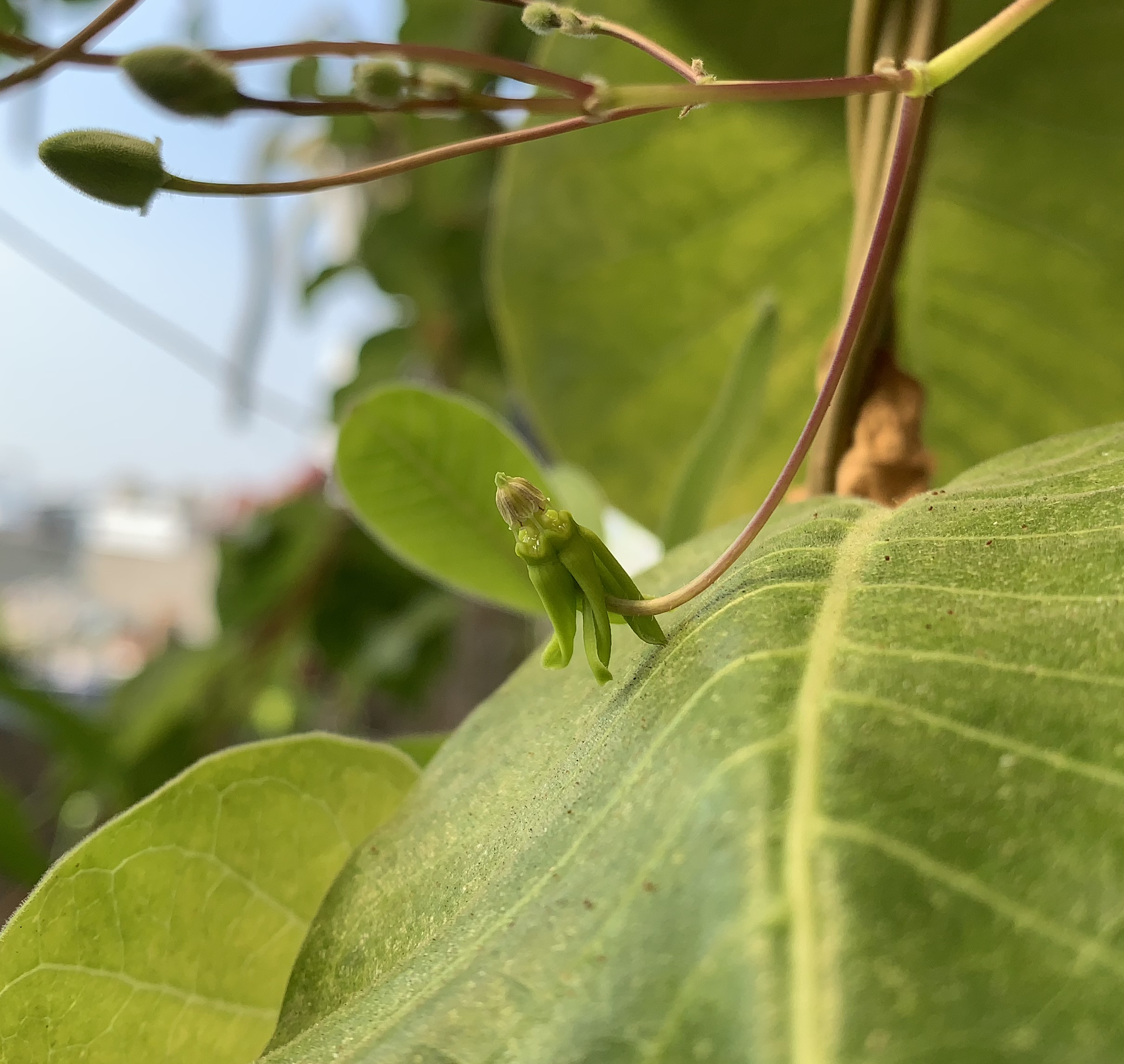

Scientific classification
- Kingdom: Plantae
- Clade: Tracheophytes
- Clade: Angiosperms
- Clade: Eudicots
- Clade: Asterids
- Order: Gentianales
- Family: Apocynaceae
- Subfamily: Periplocoideae
- Genus: Baseonema; Schltr. & Rendle
- Species: B. gregorii

Binomial name
- Baseonema gregorii Schltr. & Rendle

= Baseonema =

Genus of flowering plants

Baseonema is a genus of flowering plants belonging to the family Apocynaceae. The only species is Baseonema gregorii.

Its native range is Eastern Tropical Africa.
