= Neoschumannia =

Scientific classification
- Kingdom: Plantae
- Clade: Tracheophytes
- Clade: Angiosperms
- Clade: Eudicots
- Clade: Asterids
- Order: Gentianales
- Family: Apocynaceae
- Subfamily: Asclepiadoideae
- Tribe: Ceropegieae
- Genus: Neoschumannia; Schltr.

Genus of plants

Neoschumannia is a genus of plant in family Apocynaceae, first described as a genus in 1905. It is native to Africa.

Species

1. Neoschumannia cardinea (S. Moore) Meve - Zimbabwe
2. Neoschumannia kamerunensis Schltr. - Cameroon
