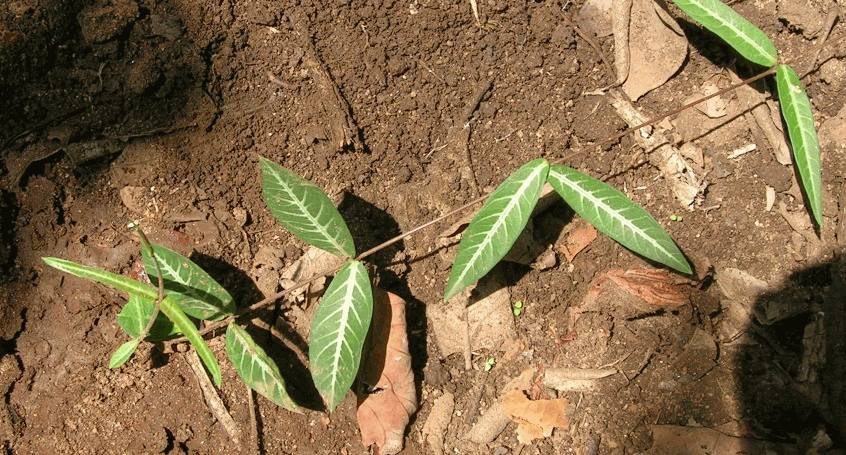

Scientific classification
- Kingdom: Plantae
- Clade: Tracheophytes
- Clade: Angiosperms
- Clade: Eudicots
- Clade: Asterids
- Order: Gentianales
- Family: Apocynaceae
- Genus: Hemidesmus
- Species: H. indicus

Binomial name
- Hemidesmus indicus (L.) R.Br.

Synonyms
- Periploca indica

= Hemidesmus indicus =

Indian sarsaparilla

Species of flowering plant

Hemidesmus indicus, Indian sarsaparilla, is a species of plant found in South Asia. It occurs over the greater part of India, from the upper Gangetic plain eastwards to Assam and in some places in central, western and South India.

The root is a substitute for sarsaparilla (the dried root of the tropical species of Smilax, Smilacaceae; in India Smilax aspera L., and Smilax ovalifolia Roxb.). It should be distinguished from Mexican sarsaparilla Smilax aristolochiifolia Mill. and Jamaican sarsaparilla Smilax ornata Hook.f..

== Names ==
In India, it is called ananthamoola, also known locally in Southern India as naruneendi or nannari.

== Description ==
It is a slender, twining, sometimes prostrate or semi-erect climber. Roots are woody and aromatic. The stem is numerous, slender, terete, thickened at the nodes. The leaves are opposite, short-petioled, very variable, elliptic-oblong to linear-lanceolate. The flowers are greenish outside, purplish inside, crowded in sub-sessile axillary cymes.

== Traditional uses ==
Hemidesmus indicus is used to make beverages like nannari sharbat, and is used in traditional medicine.

In southern states of India (particularly Tamil Nadu), the pickled roots are served along with rice dishes.

== Chemical constituents ==
The major component of the essential oil of the roots is the fragrant phenolic compound 2-hydroxy-4-methoxybenzaldehyde, a positional isomer of vanillin.

The roots of H. indicus contain hexatriacontane, lupeol, its octacosanoate, α-amyrin, β-amyrin, its acetate and sitosterol. It also contains new coumarino-lignoid-hemidesminine, hemidesmin I and hemidesmin II50, six pentacyclic triterpenes including two oleanenes, and three ursenes. The stem contains calogenin acetylcalogenin-3-0-β-D-digitoxopyrannosyl-0-β-D-digitoxopyronsyl-0-β-D-digitoxopyranoside. It also afforded 3-keto-lup-12-en-21 28-olide along with lupanone, lupeol-3-β-acetate, hexadecanoic acid, 4-methoxy-3-methoxybenzalaldehyde and 3-methoxy-4-5methoxybenzalaldehydglycosides-indicine and hemidine. The leaves contain tannins, flavonoids, hyperoside, rutin and coumarino. Leucoderma lignoids such as hemidesminine, hemidesmin I and hemidesmin II are rare group of naturally occurring compounds present in leaves.
