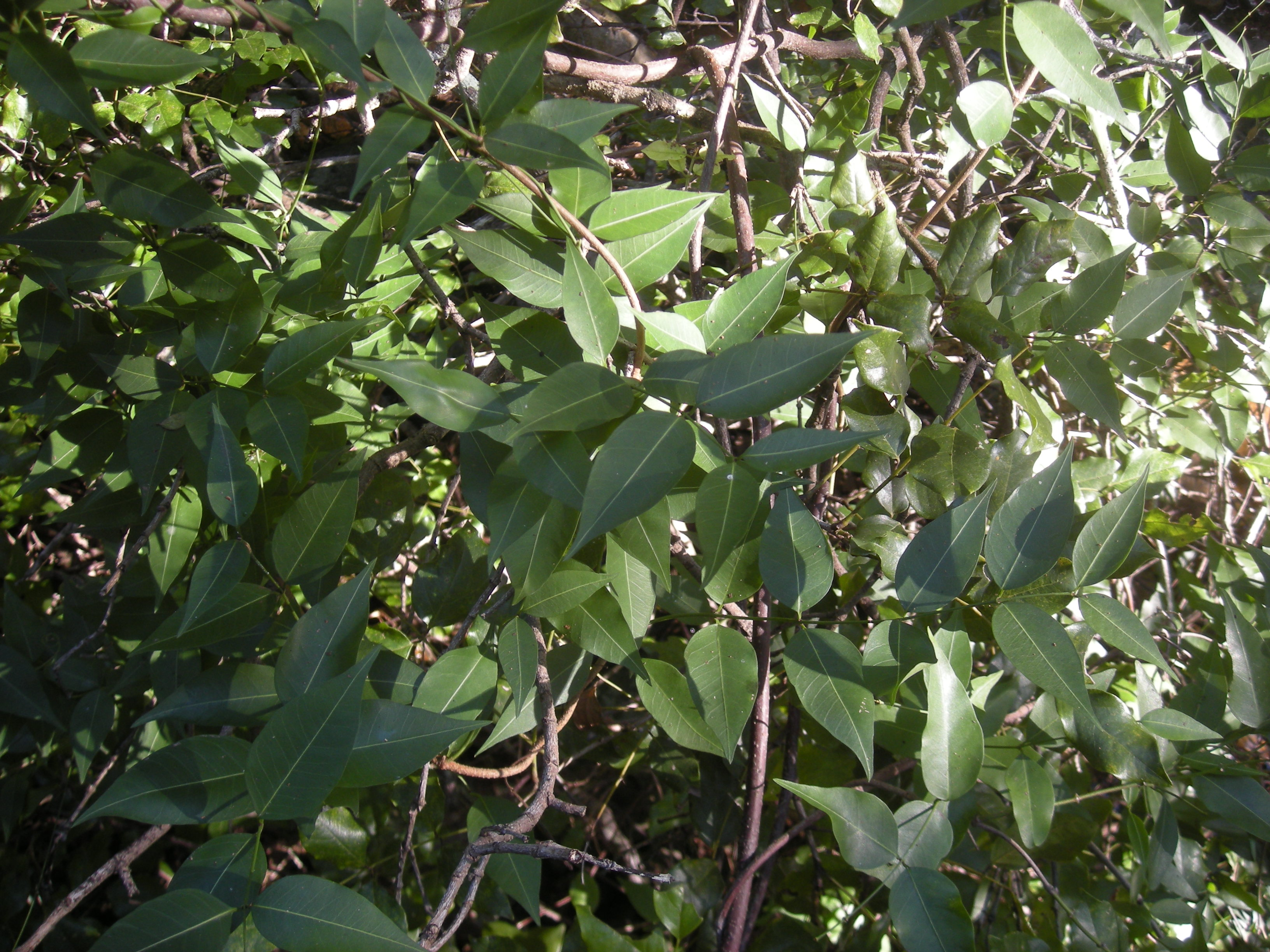

Scientific classification
- Kingdom: Plantae
- Clade: Tracheophytes
- Clade: Angiosperms
- Clade: Eudicots
- Clade: Asterids
- Order: Gentianales
- Family: Apocynaceae
- Genus: Gymnanthera
- Species: G. oblonga

Binomial name
- Gymnanthera oblonga (Burm.f.) P.S.Green

Synonyms
- Gymnanthera nitida R.Br.; Jasminum oblongum N.L.Burman; Dicerolepis paludosa Blume; Gymnanthera nitida R.Br.; Gymnanthera paludosa (Blume) K. Schumann; Parechites bowringii Hance; Trachelospermum bowringii (Hance) Hemsley

= Gymnanthera oblonga =

Species of plant

Gymnanthera oblonga is a species of vine in the family Apocynaceae (previously Asclepiadaceae) from northern Australia, southeast Asia (Cambodia, Indonesia, Malaysia, Philippines, Thailand, Vietnam), New Guinea, and southern China (Guangdong, Hainan).
