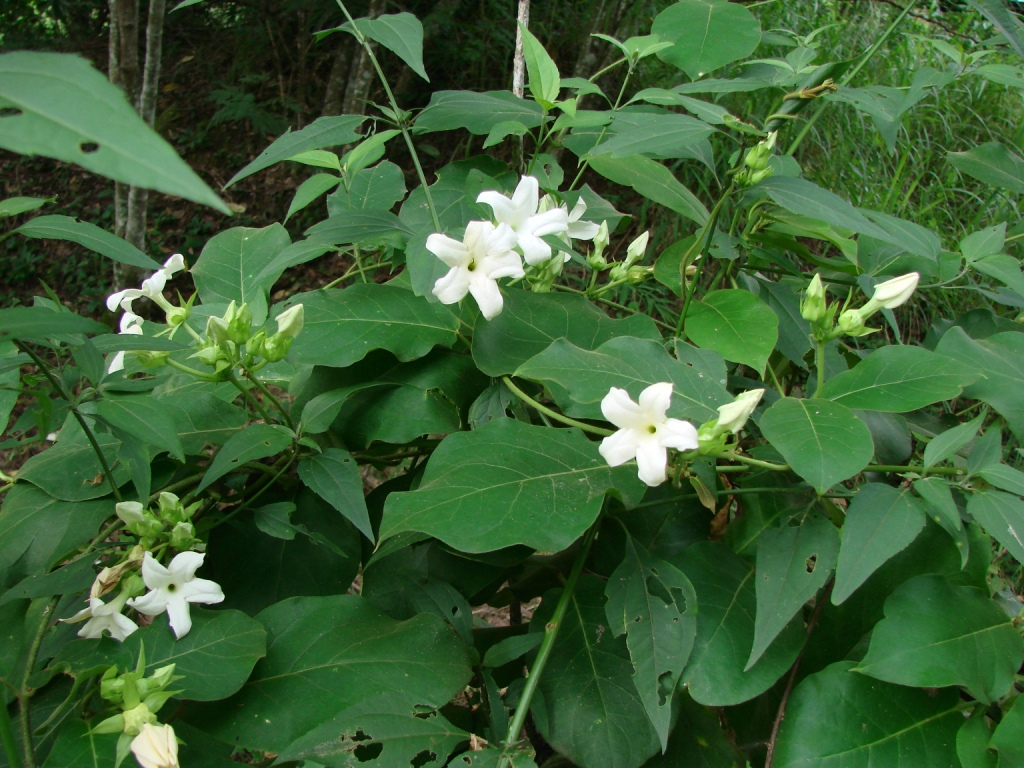
- Schubertia grandiflora

Scientific classification
- Kingdom: Plantae
- Clade: Tracheophytes
- Clade: Angiosperms
- Clade: Eudicots
- Clade: Asterids
- Order: Gentianales
- Family: Apocynaceae
- Subfamily: Asclepiadoideae
- Tribe: Asclepiadeae
- Genus: Schubertia; Mart. 1824 not Blume 1826 (Araliaceae, nom. illeg.) nor Mirb. 1812 (Cupressaceae, nom. rej.)

= Schubertia =

Genus of flowering plants

Schubertia is a genus of flowering plants in the family Apocynaceae, first described as a genus in 1810. It is native to South America.

The name Schubertia has been used three times in botany, with this genus in the Apocynaceae the only one retaining the name. Species names created using the other two homonyms have all been changed in accordance with international botanical custom (see below).

Species

1. Schubertia grandiflora Mart. - Argentina, Bolivia, Paraguay, Brazil, Peru
2. Schubertia morilloana Fontella - Minas Gerais, Bahia
3. Schubertia multiflora Mart. - Piauí, Bahia, Pernambuco
4. Schubertia schreiteri Descole & T. Mey. - Chuquisaca in Bolivia; Jujuy + Salta in Argentina

formerly included

moved to other genera (Araujia, Cryptomeria, Glyptostrobus, Harmsiopanax, Macroscepis, Matelea, Sequoia, Taxodium, Widdringtonia)

1. S. aculeata now Harmsiopanax aculeatus (Araliaceae)
2. S. capensis now Widdringtonia nodiflora (Cupressaceae)
3. S. disticha now Taxodium distichum (Cupressaceae)
4. S. graveolens now Araujia graveolens
5. S. hamata now Matelea longiflora
6. S. japonica now Cryptomeria japonica (Cupressaceae)
7. S. longiflora now Glyptostrobus pensilis (Cupressaceae)
8. S. sempervirens now Sequoia sempervirens (Cupressaceae)
9. S. tristis now Macroscepis hirsuta
