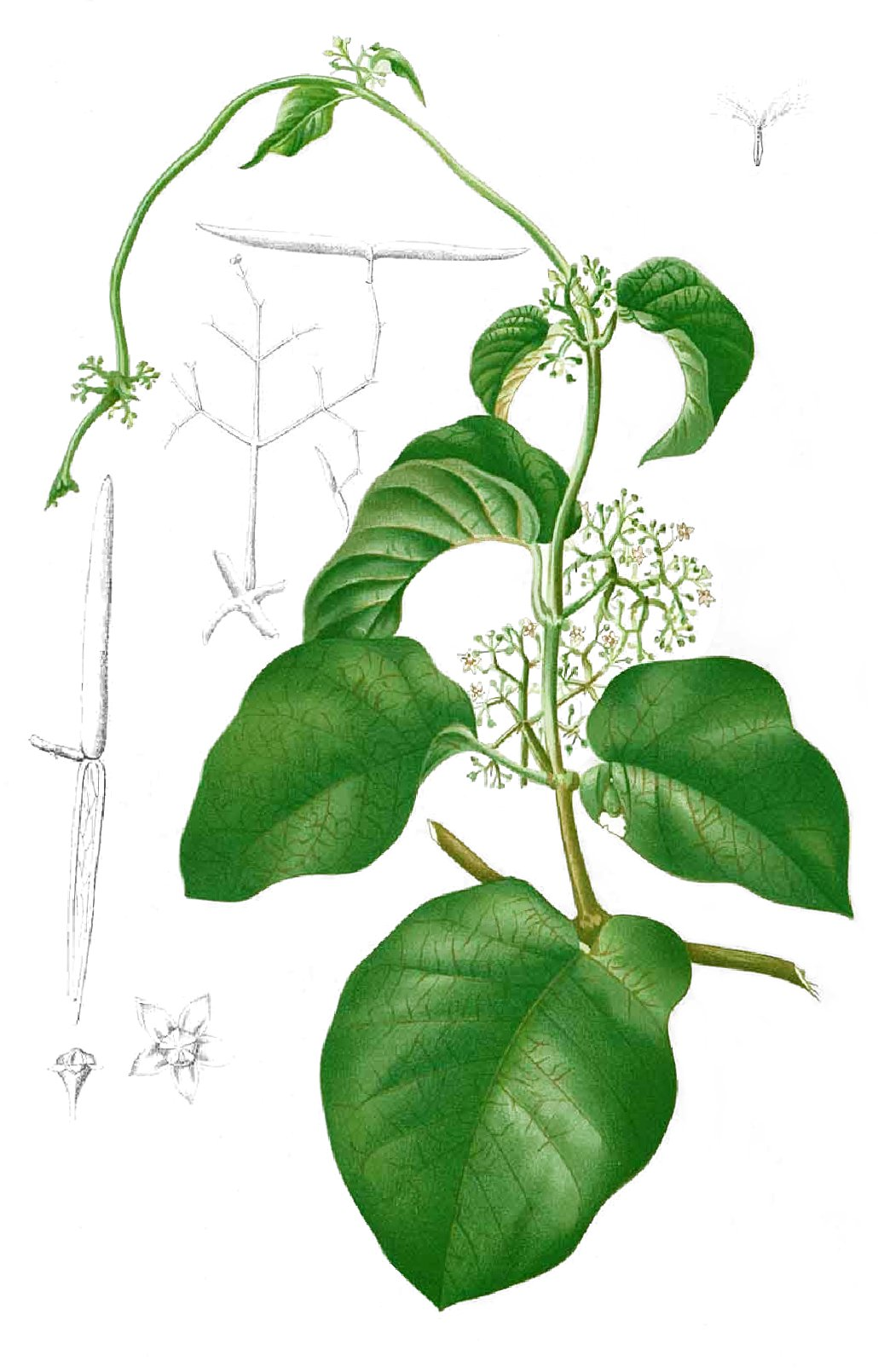
- Streptocaulon baumii

Scientific classification
- Kingdom: Plantae
- Clade: Tracheophytes
- Clade: Angiosperms
- Clade: Eudicots
- Clade: Asterids
- Order: Gentianales
- Family: Apocynaceae
- Subfamily: Periplocoideae
- Genus: Streptocaulon; Wight & Arn. 1834

= Streptocaulon =

Genus of plants

Streptocaulon is a genus of plants in the family Apocynaceae, first described as a genus in 1834. It is native to India, China and Southeast Asia.

Species

1. Streptocaulon albicans (Poir.) G. Don - E India
2. Streptocaulon baumii Decne. - Luzon + Mindoro in Philippines
3. Streptocaulon corymbosum (Elmer) Elmer - Luzon in Philippines
4. Streptocaulon cumingii (Turcz.) Fern.-Vill. - Luzon in Philippines
5. Streptocaulon juventas (Lour.) Merr. - India, Indochina
6. Streptocaulon parviflorum (Poir.) G. Don - E India

formerly included

moved to other genera (Calotropis, Cryptolepis, Myriopteron, Periploca, Strophanthus, Vincetoxicum)

1. S. calophyllum now Periploca calophylla
2. S. chinense now Cryptolepis sinensis
3. S. cochinchinense now Calotropis gigantea
4. S. divaricatum now Strophanthus divaricatus
5. S. extensum now Myriopteron extensum
6. S. horsfieldii now Myriopteron extensum
7. S. virgatum now Vincetoxicum virgatum
