= Bahiella =

Scientific classification
- Kingdom: Plantae
- Clade: Tracheophytes
- Clade: Angiosperms
- Clade: Eudicots
- Clade: Asterids
- Order: Gentianales
- Family: Apocynaceae
- Subfamily: Apocynoideae
- Tribe: Echiteae
- Genus: Bahiella; J.F.Morales

Type species
- Bahiella blanchetii (A.DC.) J.F.Morales

Genus of plants

Bahiella is a genus of plants in the family Apocynaceae first described as a genus in 2006. The entire group is endemic to the State of Bahia in northeastern Brazil, the state after which the genus is named.

Species

- Bahiella blanchetii (A.DC.) J.F.Morales
- Bahiella infundibuliflora J.F.Morales
