= Thoreauea =

Scientific classification
- Kingdom: Plantae
- Clade: Tracheophytes
- Clade: Angiosperms
- Clade: Eudicots
- Clade: Asterids
- Order: Gentianales
- Family: Apocynaceae
- Genus: Thoreauea; J.K.Williams

Genus of flowering plants

Thoreauea is a genus of flowering plants belonging to the family Apocynaceae.

It is native to southern Mexico.

The genus name of Thoreauea is in honour of Henry David Thoreau (1817–1862), an American naturalist, essayist, poet and philosopher. It was first described and published in Lundellia Vol.5 on page 47 in 2002.

== Known species ==
According to Royal Botanic Gardens, Kew:

- Thoreauea aberrans J.F.Morales
- Thoreauea guerrerensis Diego & Lozada-Pérez
- Thoreauea paneroi J.K.Williams
