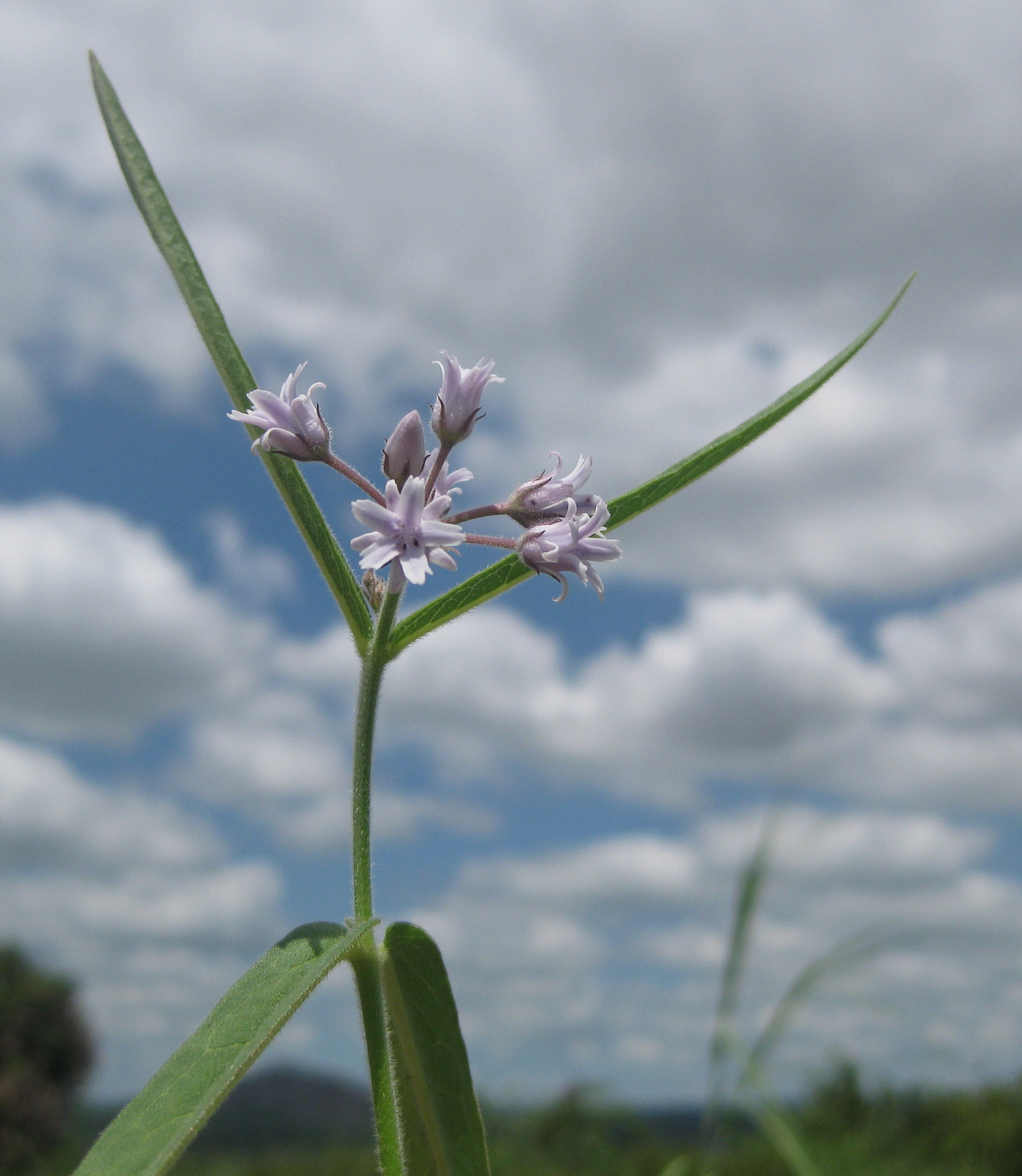

Scientific classification
- Kingdom: Plantae
- Clade: Tracheophytes
- Clade: Angiosperms
- Clade: Eudicots
- Clade: Asterids
- Order: Gentianales
- Family: Apocynaceae
- Subfamily: Asclepiadoideae
- Tribe: Asclepiadeae
- Genus: Margaretta; Oliv.
- Species: M. rosea

Binomial name
- Margaretta rosea Oliv.

= Margaretta =

Genus of plants

Margaretta is a genus of plants in the family Apocynaceae first described as a genus in 1875. A dozen names have been proposed as species within Margaretta, but at present only one, Margaretta rosea, is categorized as "accepted" by The Plant List. Most of the rest are "unresolved," in other words, of uncertain affinity. Margaretta rosea is native to Uganda in eastern Africa.
