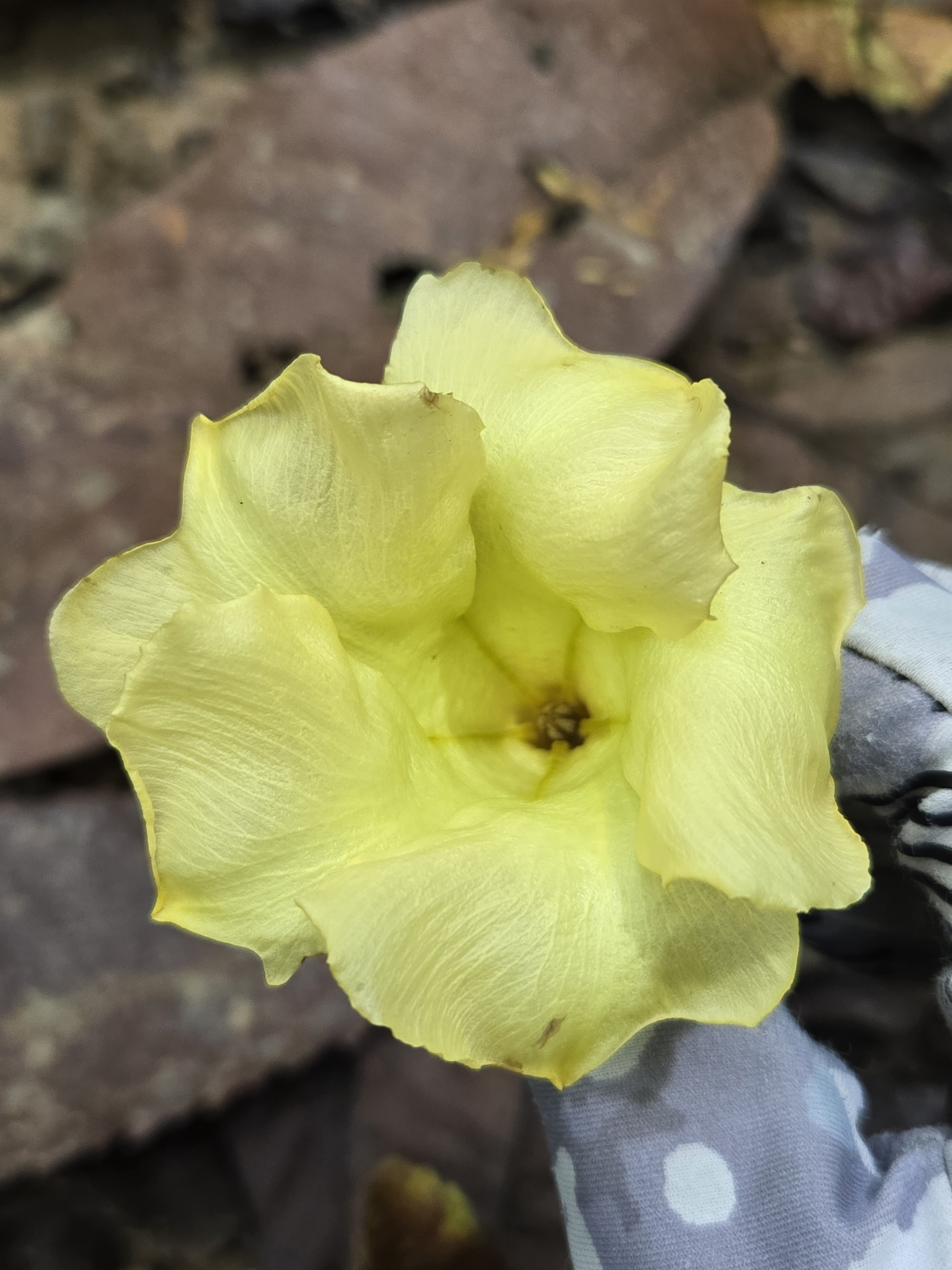
- Macropharynx isthmica in Panama

Scientific classification
- Kingdom: Plantae
- Clade: Embryophytes
- Clade: Tracheophytes
- Clade: Spermatophytes
- Clade: Angiosperms
- Clade: Eudicots
- Clade: Asterids
- Order: Gentianales
- Family: Apocynaceae
- Subfamily: Apocynoideae
- Tribe: Echiteae
- Genus: Macropharynx; Rusby

Synonyms
- Peltastes Woodson

= Macropharynx =

Genus of plants

Macropharynx is a genus of plants in the family Apocynaceae, first described as a genus in 1927. It is native to South America and Central America.

Based on a phylogenetic analysis, the genus Peltastes was merged into Macropharynx in 2017.

== Species ==
14 species are currently accepted:

- Macropharynx abnorma J.F.Morales, M.E.Endress & Liede – northern Peru
- Macropharynx anomala Woodson – Ecuador
- Macropharynx colombiana (Woodson) J.F.Morales, M.E.Endress & Liede – northern Colombia and northwestern Venezuela
- Macropharynx conflictiva (J.F.Morales) J.F.Morales, M.E.Endress & Liede – northern Peru
- Macropharynx gigantea (Woodson) J.F.Morales, M.E.Endress & Liede – Peru and northern Bolivia
- Macropharynx isthmica (Woodson) J.F.Morales, M.E.Endress & Liede – Costa Rica to northwestern Venezuela
- Macropharynx meyeri (C.Ezcurra) Xifreda – northwestern Argentina
- Macropharynx peltata (Vell.) J.F.Morales, M.E.Endress & Liede – northeastern Brazil to northern Argentina
- Macropharynx peruviana (Woodson) J.F.Morales, M.E.Endress & Liede – Peru
- Macropharynx pulchra (Miers) J.F.Morales, M.E.Endress & Liede – eastern Brazil
- Macropharynx renteriae A.H.Gentry – Costa Rica, Honduras, Colombia, and Ecuador
- Macropharynx spectabilis (Stadelm.) Woodson – Colombia, Venezuela, Guyana, Suriname, northwestern Brazil, Peru, and Ecuador
- Macropharynx steyermarkii (Markgr.) J.F.Morales – northwestern Venezuela
- Macropharynx venusta (J.F.Morales) J.F.Morales, M.E.Endress & Liede – Ecuador
