= Caa =

Scientific classification
- Kingdom: Plantae
- Clade: Tracheophytes
- Clade: Angiosperms
- Clade: Eudicots
- Clade: Asterids
- Order: Gentianales
- Family: Apocynaceae
- Genus: Caa; H.A.Keller & Liede (2020)
- Species: C. balansae

Binomial name
- Caa balansae (Morillo & Fontella) H.A.Keller & Liede (2020)

Synonyms
- Matelea balansae Morillo & Fontella (2012)

Genus of flowering plants

Caa balansae is a species of flowering plant in the dogbane family, Apocynaceae. It is the sole species in genus Caa. It is a liana native to Paraguay to Misiones Province of northeastern Argentina.
