= Manothrix =

Scientific classification
- Kingdom: Plantae
- Clade: Tracheophytes
- Clade: Angiosperms
- Clade: Eudicots
- Clade: Asterids
- Order: Gentianales
- Family: Apocynaceae
- Subfamily: Asclepiadoideae
- Genus: Manothrix; Miers

Genus of plants

Manothrix is a genus of plants in the family Apocynaceae, first described as a genus in 1878. The entire genus is endemic to Brazil.

In 1993, Cecilia Carmen Xifreda published an analysis of the two species of the genus and concluded that Manothrix nodosa = Mesechites trifidus (Apocynaceae) and Manothrix valida = Hillia parasitica (Rubiaceae). Mesechites trifidus and Hillia parasitica were both described before Manothrix, so have priority as names.

Species

1. Manothrix nodosa Miers
2. Manothrix valida Miers
