= Cristobalia (plant) =

Scientific classification
- Kingdom: Plantae
- Clade: Tracheophytes
- Clade: Angiosperms
- Clade: Eudicots
- Clade: Asterids
- Order: Gentianales
- Family: Apocynaceae
- Genus: Cristobalia; Morillo, S.A.Cáceres & H.A.Keller (2016)

Species
- Four species; see text

Genus of plants

Cristobalia is a genus of flowering plants in the dogbane family (Apocynaceae). It includes four species which are native to Bolivia, Paraguay, southern Brazil, Uruguay, and northern Argentina in South America.

- Cristobalia australis (Malme) H.A.Keller & Liede – southern Brazil, northern Argentina, and Uruguay
- Cristobalia bella Morillo, H.A.Keller & S.A.Cáceres – northeastern Argentina (Corrientes and Misiones)
- Cristobalia hirsutissima (Schltr.) Morillo, S.A.Cáceres & H.A.Keller – southwestern Bolivia and northwestern Argentina (Salta)
- Cristobalia hispida (Hook. & Arn.) H.A.Keller & Liede – northern Argentina
