= Carruthersia =

Scientific classification
- Kingdom: Plantae
- Clade: Tracheophytes
- Clade: Angiosperms
- Clade: Eudicots
- Clade: Asterids
- Order: Gentianales
- Family: Apocynaceae
- Subfamily: Apocynoideae
- Tribe: Malouetieae
- Genus: Carruthersia; Seem.

Type species
- Carruthersia scandens (Seem.) Seem.

Genus of flowering plants

Carruthersia is a genus of plants in the family Apocynaceae first described as a genus in 1866. It is native to the Philippines and to certain islands of the Western Pacific.

Species

- Carruthersia glabra D.J.Middleton - Samar Island in Philippines
- Carruthersia latifolia Gillespie - Fiji, Tonga
- Carruthersia pilosa (A.DC.) Fern.-Vill. - Philippines, Solomon Islands, possibly Vanuatu
- Carruthersia scandens (Seem.) Seem. - Fiji
