= Laubertia =

Scientific classification
- Kingdom: Plantae
- Clade: Tracheophytes
- Clade: Angiosperms
- Clade: Eudicots
- Clade: Asterids
- Order: Gentianales
- Family: Apocynaceae
- Subfamily: Apocynoideae
- Tribe: Echiteae
- Genus: Laubertia; A.DC.

Synonyms
- Streptotrachelus Greenm.

Genus of flowering plants

Laubertia, a genus of plants in the family Apocynaceae, was first described 1844. They are native to Mexico, Central America, and South America.

Species

- Laubertia boissieri A.DC. - Venezuela, Colombia, Ecuador, Peru, Bolivia
- Laubertia contorta (M.Martens & Galeotti) Woodson - Mexico from Chiapas north to Sinaloa and San Luis Potosí
- Laubertia peninsularis Woodson - Belize
