= Allowoodsonia =

Scientific classification
- Kingdom: Plantae
- Clade: Tracheophytes
- Clade: Angiosperms
- Clade: Eudicots
- Clade: Asterids
- Order: Gentianales
- Family: Apocynaceae
- Subfamily: Apocynoideae
- Tribe: Malouetieae
- Genus: Allowoodsonia; Markgr.
- Species: A. whitmore

Binomial name
- Allowoodsonia whitmore Markgr.

Genus of flowering plants

Allowoodsonia is a plant genus in the family Apocynaceae, first described in 1967. It contains only one known species, Allowoodsonia whitmorei, endemic to the Solomon Islands in the SW Pacific.
