= Anechites =

Scientific classification
- Kingdom: Plantae
- Clade: Tracheophytes
- Clade: Angiosperms
- Clade: Eudicots
- Clade: Asterids
- Order: Gentianales
- Family: Apocynaceae
- Genus: Anechites; Griseb.

Genus of flowering plants

Anechites is a genus of flowering plants belonging to the family Apocynaceae.

Its native range is the Caribbean, Central America, and Western South America to Venezuela.

Species:

- Anechites nerium (Aubl.) Urb.
