= Brargentina =

Scientific classification
- Kingdom: Plantae
- Clade: Tracheophytes
- Clade: Angiosperms
- Clade: Eudicots
- Clade: Asterids
- Order: Gentianales
- Family: Apocynaceae
- Genus: Brargentina; Morillo & H.A.Keller (2016)
- Species: B. bornmuelleri

Binomial name
- Brargentina bornmuelleri (Schltr. ex Malme) Morillo & H.A.Keller (2016)

Synonyms
- Gyrostelma bornmuelleri Schltr. ex Malme (1933); Rojasia bornmuelleri (Schltr. ex Malme) Fontella, S.A.Cáceres & R.Santos (2014)

Genus of flowering plants

Brargentina bornmuelleri is a species of flowering plant in the dogbane family, Apocynaceae. It is a perennial native to Paraguay, northeastern Argentina, and southern Brazil. It is the sole species in genus Brargentina.
