= Meveampelos =

Scientific classification
- Kingdom: Plantae
- Clade: Tracheophytes
- Clade: Angiosperms
- Clade: Eudicots
- Clade: Asterids
- Order: Gentianales
- Family: Apocynaceae
- Subfamily: Asclepiadoideae
- Tribe: Asclepiadeae
- Subtribe: Gonolobinae
- Genus: Meveampelos; Morillo

Species
- Meveampelos bicolor (Britton & P.Wilson) Morillo; Meveampelos ekmanii (Urb.) Morillo

Genus of flowering plants

Meveampelos is a genus of flowering plants in the family Apocynaceae. It includes two species endemic to Cuba.

- Meveampelos bicolor (Britton & P.Wilson) Morillo
- Meveampelos ekmanii (Urb.) Morillo
