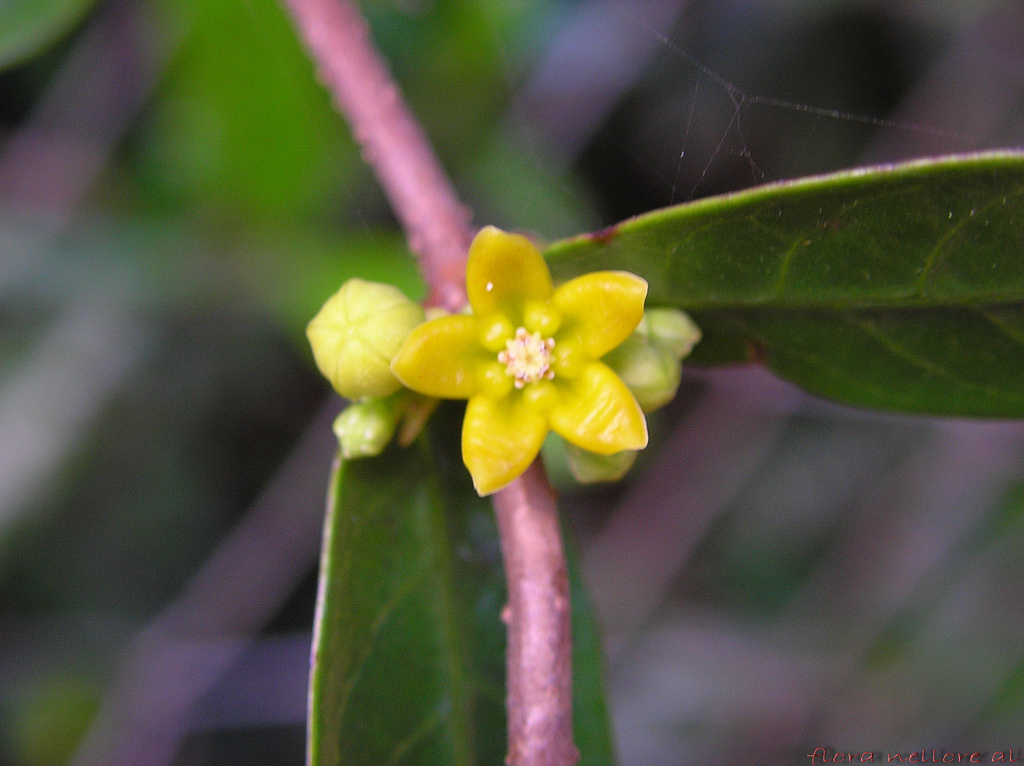
- Hemidesmus indicus var. indicus

Scientific classification
- Kingdom: Plantae
- Clade: Tracheophytes
- Clade: Angiosperms
- Clade: Eudicots
- Clade: Asterids
- Order: Gentianales
- Family: Apocynaceae
- Subfamily: Periplocoideae
- Genus: Hemidesmus; R.Br. 1810

= Hemidesmus =

Genus of flowering plants

Hemidesmus is a genus of plants in the family Apocynaceae, first described in 1810. It is native to the Indian Subcontinent.

Species

1. Hemidesmus cordatus (Poir.) Schult. - India
2. Hemidesmus indicus (L.) R. Br. ex Schult. - Pakistan, India, Bangladesh

formerly included

1. Hemidesmus indicus var. pubescens Hook.f., syn of Finlaysonia wallichii (Wight) Venter
2. Hemidesmus pubescens Wight & Arn., syn of Finlaysonia wallichii (Wight) Venter
3. Hemidesmus wallichii Wight, syn of Finlaysonia wallichii (Wight) Venter
