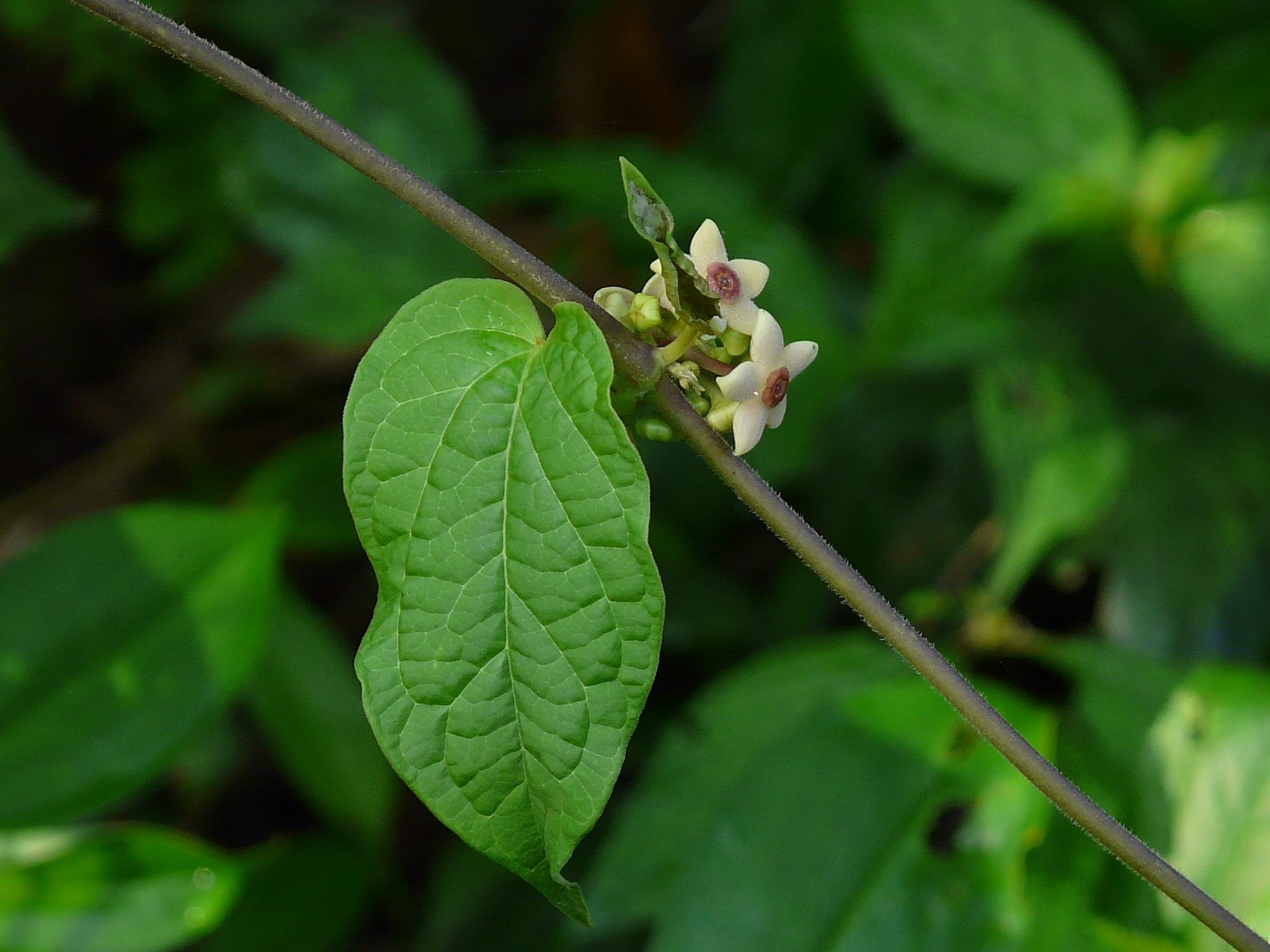
- Heterostemma dalzellii

Scientific classification
- Kingdom: Plantae
- Clade: Tracheophytes
- Clade: Angiosperms
- Clade: Eudicots
- Clade: Asterids
- Order: Gentianales
- Family: Apocynaceae
- Subfamily: Asclepiadoideae
- Tribe: Ceropegieae
- Genus: Heterostemma; Wight & Arn. (1834)

Synonyms
- Dittoceras Hook.f. (1883); Oianthus Benth. (1876); Symphysicarpus Hassk. (1857)

= Heterostemma =

Genus of flowering plants

Heterostemma is a genus of plants in the family Apocynaceae, first described in 1834. It is native to India, China, Taiwan, Southeast Asia, Australia, and certain islands in the Pacific.

== Species ==
45 species are currently accepted:

1. Heterostemma acuminatum Decne. – Java
2. Heterostemma alatum Wight & Arn. – Indian subcontinent and Myanmar
3. Heterostemma andersonii (Hook.f.) Rodda – eastern Himalayas (Sikkim to Darjeeling)
4. Heterostemma angustilobum Schltr. – Philippines (Mindanao)
5. Heterostemma barikianum P.Agnihotri, D.Husain, P.Katiyar, D.Sahoo, Rodda & T.Husain – Manipur, Myanmar, and Thailand
6. Heterostemma beddomei (Hook.f.) Swarupan. & Mangaly – southwestern India
7. Heterostemma bicanthaceum Meve, Gâteblé & Liede – New Caledonia
8. Heterostemma brownii Hayata – southern China including Taiwan
9. Heterostemma carnosum Rodda – eastern New Guinea
10. Heterostemma collinum Schltr. – New Guinea
11. Heterostemma cucphuongense T.B.Tran & Rodda – Vietnam
12. Heterostemma cuspidatum Decne. – Philippines
13. Heterostemma dalzellii Hook.f. – western India
14. Heterostemma deccanense (Talbot) Swarupan. & Mangaly – southwestern India (Maharashtra and Kerala)
15. Heterostemma disciflorum (Hook.f.) Swarupan. & Mangaly – southern India (Andhra Pradesh and Karnataka)
16. Heterostemma esquirolii (H.Lév.) Tsiang – Thailand and southern China
17. Heterostemma ficoides A.Kidyoo – Thailand
18. Heterostemma fimbriatum King & Gamble – Peninsular Malaysia (Perak)
19. Heterostemma garrettii (Kerr) Rodda – Thailand
20. Heterostemma grandiflorum Costantin – Vietnam and southern China
21. Heterostemma herbertii Elmer – Philippines (Luzon)
22. Heterostemma kaniense Schltr. – New Guinea
23. Heterostemma lobulatum Y.H.Li & Konta – Yunnan
24. Heterostemma maculatum (Kerr) Rodda – Thailand
25. Heterostemma magnificum P.I.Forst. – Australia (Northern Territory)
26. Heterostemma membranifolium (Lauterb. & K.Schum.) Schltr. – Bismarck Archipelago
27. Heterostemma menghaiense (H.Zhu & H.Wang) M.G.Gilbert & P.T.Li - Yunnan, Hainan, and Taiwan
28. Heterostemma montanum Schltr. – New Guinea
29. Heterostemma oblongifolium Costantin – Vietnam, Laos, southern China
30. Heterostemma pingtaoi Shao Y.He & J.Y.Lin – Hainan
31. Heterostemma piperifolium King & Gamble – southern Indochina (Vietnam, Cambodia, and Thailand) and Peninsular Malaysia
32. Heterostemma samoense (A. Gray) P.I. Forst. – Samoa
33. Heterostemma saolaense Rodda & T.A.Le – Vietnam
34. Heterostemma siamicum Craib – Thailand, Vietnam, southern China (southern Yunnan and Guangxi)
35. Heterostemma sinicum Tsiang – Hainan
36. Heterostemma stellatum Hook.f. – eastern Himalayas and Assam
37. Heterostemma suberosum Costantin – Vietnam
38. Heterostemma succosum Kerr – Thailand
39. Heterostemma tanjorense Wight & Arn. – India and Sri Lanka
40. Heterostemma trilobatum A.Kidyoo & Thaithong – Thailand
41. Heterostemma tsoongii Tsiang - southern China (Guangxi, Fujian, and Hainan)
42. Heterostemma urceolatum Dalzell – southwestern India (Maharashtra and Karnataka)
43. Heterostemma vasudevanii Swarupan. & Mangaly – India (Kerala)
44. Heterostemma wallichii Wight & Arn. - Yunnan, Nepal, Assam, and Bhutan
45. Heterostemma xuansonense T.B.Tran & J.Hw.Kim – Vietnam
