= Peruviasclepias =

Scientific classification
- Kingdom: Plantae
- Clade: Tracheophytes
- Clade: Angiosperms
- Clade: Eudicots
- Clade: Asterids
- Order: Gentianales
- Family: Apocynaceae
- Tribe: Asclepiadeae
- Subtribe: Gonolobinae
- Genus: Peruviasclepias; Morillo (2015)
- Species: P. aliciae

Binomial name
- Peruviasclepias aliciae (Morillo) Morillo (2015)

Synonyms
- Matelea aliciae Morillo (1986 publ. 1987)

Genus of flowering plants

Peruviasclepias aliciae is a species of flowering plant in the dogbane family, Apocynaceae. It is the sole species in genus Peruviasclepias. It is a climber endemic to Peru.

The species was first described as Matelea aliciae in 1986 by Gilberto Morillo, and published the following year. In 2015 Morillo renamed it Peruviasclepias aliciae, placing it in its own monotypic genus.
