= Morilloa =

Scientific classification
- Kingdom: Plantae
- Clade: Tracheophytes
- Clade: Angiosperms
- Clade: Eudicots
- Clade: Asterids
- Order: Gentianales
- Family: Apocynaceae
- Genus: Morilloa; Fontella, Goes & S.A.Cáceres

Genus of plants

Morilloa is a genus of flowering plants belonging to the family Apocynaceae.

Its native range is Eastern Brazil.

Species:

- Morilloa carassensis (Malme) Fontella, Goes & S.A.Cáceres
- Morilloa furlanii (Fontella) Fontella, Goes & S.A.Cáceres
- Morilloa lutea (E.Fourn.) Fontella, Goes & S.A.Cáceres
- Morilloa piranii (Fontella) Fontella, Goes & S.A.Cáceres
