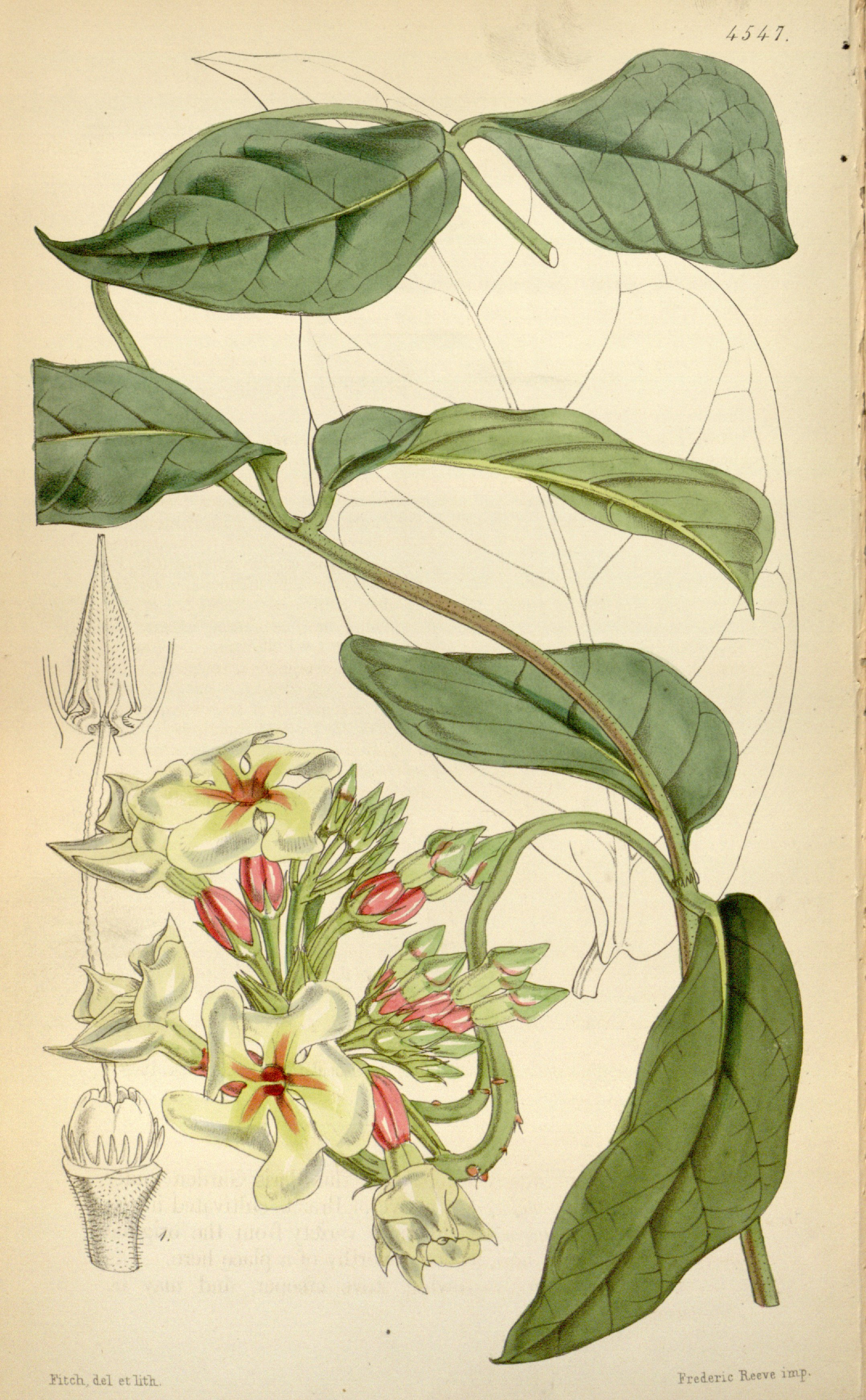
- Temnadenia odorifera

Scientific classification
- Kingdom: Plantae
- Clade: Tracheophytes
- Clade: Angiosperms
- Clade: Eudicots
- Clade: Asterids
- Order: Gentianales
- Family: Apocynaceae
- Subfamily: Apocynoideae
- Tribe: Echiteae
- Genus: Temnadenia; Miers

= Temnadenia =

Genus of plants

Temnadenia is a genus of flowering plants in the family Apocynaceae, first described as a genus in 1878. It is native to South America.

Species

- Temnadenia odorifera (Vell.) J.F.Morales - Brazil
- Temnadenia ornata (Hoehne) Woodson - Bolivia, Peru, W Brazil
- Temnadenia stenantha Woodson - Boyacá region of Colombia
- Temnadenia violacea (Vell.) Miers - Brazil

formerly included

1. Temnadenia annularis = Prestonia annularis
2. Temnadenia cordata = Mandevilla oaxacana
3. Temnadenia corrugulata = Prestonia solanifolia
4. Temnadenia glaucescens = Mandevilla oaxacana
5. Temnadenia lasiocarpa = Mandevilla hirsuta
6. Temnadenia leptoloba = Prestonia quinquangularis
7. Temnadenia lobbiana = Mandevilla hirsuta
8. Temnadenia meyeri = Macropharynx meyeri
9. Temnadenia palustris = Mandevilla hirsuta
10. Temnadenia parviflora = Prestonia parviflora
11. Temnadenia quinquangularis = Prestonia quinquangularis
12. Temnadenia riedelii = Prestonia riedelii
13. Temnadenia secundiflora = Mandevilla subsagittata
14. Temnadenia semidigyna = Echites semidigynus
15. Temnadenia solanifolia = Prestonia solanifolia
16. Temnadenia tenuicula = Prestonia solanifolia
17. Temnadenia tomentosa = Mandevilla hirsuta
18. Temnadenia xanthostoma = Mandevilla coccinea
