= Urostephanus =

Scientific classification
- Kingdom: Plantae
- Clade: Tracheophytes
- Clade: Angiosperms
- Clade: Eudicots
- Clade: Asterids
- Order: Gentianales
- Family: Apocynaceae
- Subfamily: Asclepiadoideae
- Tribe: Asclepiadeae
- Subtribe: Gonolobinae
- Genus: Urostephanus; B.L.Rob. & Greenm.

Genus of plant

Urostephanus is a genus of flowering plants in the dogbane family Apocynaceae. Its species are found in Mexico, Guatemala, and Honduras. Originally described in 1895, it was resurrected from the non‑monophyletic milkvine genus Matelea in 2024.

== Species ==
The following species are accepted:

- Urostephanus araneosus (Donn.Sm.) Gonz.-Martínez, Lozada-Pérez & L.O.Alvarado
- Urostephanus balrog (Gonz.-Martínez, Lozada-Pérez & L.O.Alvarado) Gonz.-Martínez
- Urostephanus cornutus (Gonz.-Martínez, Lozada-Pérez & L.O.Alvarado) Gonz.-Martínez
- Urostephanus gonoloboides B.L.Rob. & Greenm.
- Urostephanus jaimesiae (Gonz.-Martínez, Lozada-Pérez & L.O.Alvarado) Gonz.-Martínez
- Urostephanus lokii (Gonz.-Martínez, Lozada-Pérez & L.O.Alvarado) Gonz.-Martínez
- Urostephanus medusae (Woodson) Gonz.-Martínez, Lozada-Pérez & L.O.Alvarado
- Urostephanus patalensis (Donn.Sm.) Gonz.-Martínez, Lozada-Pérez & L.O.Alvarado
- Urostephanus porphyranthus (Standl.) Gonz.-Martínez, Lozada-Pérez & L.O.Alvarado
