= Talayotea =

Scientific classification
- Kingdom: Plantae
- Clade: Tracheophytes
- Clade: Angiosperms
- Clade: Eudicots
- Clade: Asterids
- Order: Gentianales
- Family: Apocynaceae
- Genus: Talayotea; L.O.Alvarado (2021)

Species
- Talayotea caudata (A.Gray) L.O.Alvarado; Talayotea trachyantha (Greenm.) L.O.Alvarado

Genus of flowering plants

Talayotea is a genus of flowering plants in the dogbane family, Apocynaceae. It includes two species endemic to Mexico.
