= Pseudosarcolobus =

Scientific classification
- Kingdom: Plantae
- Clade: Tracheophytes
- Clade: Angiosperms
- Clade: Eudicots
- Clade: Asterids
- Order: Gentianales
- Family: Apocynaceae
- Subfamily: Asclepiadoideae
- Tribe: Marsdenieae
- Genus: Pseudosarcolobus; Costantin
- Species: P. barbatus

Binomial name
- Pseudosarcolobus barbatus (Collett & Hemsl.) Rodda

Synonyms
- Gymnema barbatum (Collett & Hemsl.) Kerr; Marsdenia barbata Collett & Hemsl. (1890) (basionym); Pseudosarcolobus villosus Costantin

Genus of flowering plants

Pseudosarcolobus is a genus of flowering plant in the family Apocynaceae. It includes a single species, Pseudosarcolobus barbatus, a climber native to Myanmar, Thailand, and Vietnam.
