= Odontostephana =

Scientific classification
- Kingdom: Plantae
- Clade: Tracheophytes
- Clade: Angiosperms
- Clade: Eudicots
- Clade: Asterids
- Order: Gentianales
- Family: Apocynaceae
- Subfamily: Asclepiadoideae
- Tribe: Asclepiadeae
- Subtribe: Gonolobinae
- Genus: Odontostephana; Alexander

Genus of flowering plants

Odonotostephana is a genus of flowering plants in the family Apocynaceae. It includes seven species native to the central and eastern United States, ranging from Texas and Kansas to Florida and Pennsylvania.

== Species ==
Seven species are accepted.

- Odontostephana baldwyniana (Sweet) Alexander
- Odontostephana carolinensis (Jacq.) Alexander
- Odontostephana decipiens Alexander
- Odontostephana flavidula (Chapm.) Alexander
- Odontostephana floridana (Vail) Alexander
- Odontostephana hirtelliflora (McDonnell & Fishbein) Morillo
- Odontostephana obliqua (Jacq.) Alexander
