= Schlechterella =

Scientific classification
- Kingdom: Plantae
- Clade: Tracheophytes
- Clade: Angiosperms
- Clade: Eudicots
- Clade: Asterids
- Order: Gentianales
- Family: Apocynaceae
- Subfamily: Periplocoideae
- Genus: Schlechterella; K.Schum.

Synonyms
- Triodoglossum Bullock

Genus of plants

Schlechterella is a genus of plants in the family Apocynaceae (the dogbane family). It is native to Africa, found in Ethiopia, Kenya, Mozambique, Somalia, Tanzania and Uganda.

As of July 2024, the genus contained two species:

- Schlechterella abyssinica (Chiov.) Venter & R.L.Verh.
- Schlechterella africana (Schltr.) K.Schum.

The genus was circumscribed by Karl Moritz Schumann in H.G.A.Engler & K.A.E.Prantl, Nat. Pflanzenfam., Gesamtregister: on page 462 in 1899.

The genus name of Schlechterella is in honour of Friedrich Richard Rudolf Schlechter (1872–1925), who was a German taxonomist, botanist, and author of several works on orchids.
