= Sacleuxia =

Scientific classification
- Kingdom: Plantae
- Clade: Tracheophytes
- Clade: Angiosperms
- Clade: Eudicots
- Clade: Asterids
- Clade: Lamiids
- Order: Gentianales
- Family: Apocynaceae
- Genus: Sacleuxia; Baill.

Synonyms
- Gymnolaema Benth.; Macropelma K.Schum.

Genus of flowering plants

Sacleuxia is a genus of flowering plants in the family Apocynaceae. It is also in the Periplocoideae subfamily.

It is native to Kenya and Tanzania in eastern Tropical Africa.

The genus name of Sacleuxia is in honour of Charles Sacleux (1856–1943), a French Catholic missionary and linguist. He is known also as a botanist, having collected a herbarium of over 2000 plants in East Africa and Zanzibar. It was first described and published in Hist. Pl. Vol.10 on page 265 in 1890.

The genus is recognized by the United States Department of Agriculture and the Agricultural Research Service, but they note it could be a possible synonym of Cryptolepis R. Br.

== Known species ==
According to Kew;

- Sacleuxia newii (Benth.) Bullock
- Sacleuxia tuberosa (E.A.Bruce) Bullock
