= Acomosperma =

Scientific classification
- Kingdom: Plantae
- Clade: Tracheophytes
- Clade: Angiosperms
- Clade: Eudicots
- Clade: Asterids
- Order: Gentianales
- Family: Apocynaceae
- Genus: Acomosperma; K.Schum. ex Ule
- Species: A. rivularis

Binomial name
- Acomosperma rivularis K.Schum. ex Ule

Genus of flowering plants

Acomosperma is a genus of flowering plants in the family Apocynaceae. It includes a single species, Acomosperma rivularis, a rhizomatous geophyte endemic to northern Peru.
