= Topea =

Scientific classification
- Kingdom: Plantae
- Clade: Tracheophytes
- Clade: Angiosperms
- Clade: Eudicots
- Clade: Asterids
- Order: Gentianales
- Family: Apocynaceae
- Genus: Topea; H.A.Keller

Genus of flowering plants

Topea is a genus of flowering plants belonging to the family Apocynaceae.

Its native range is Northeastern Argentina.

Species:

- Topea micrantha (H.A.Keller) H.A.Keller
- Topea patens (H.A.Keller) H.A.Keller
