= Papuechites =

Scientific classification
- Kingdom: Plantae
- Clade: Tracheophytes
- Clade: Angiosperms
- Clade: Eudicots
- Clade: Asterids
- Order: Gentianales
- Family: Apocynaceae
- Subfamily: Apocynoideae
- Tribe: Apocyneae
- Genus: Papuechites; Markgr.
- Species: P. aambe

Binomial name
- Papuechites aambe (Warb.) Markgr.

Synonyms
- Anodendron aambe Warb.; Strophanthus aambe Warb.; Ichnocarpus bertieroides Wernham ex S.Moore

Genus of plants

Papuechites is a genus of flowering plants in the family Apocynaceae, first described as a genus in 1925. It contains only one known species, Papuechites aambe, native to New Guinea, the Bismarck Archipelago, and the Indonesian Province of Maluku.

formerly included

- Papuechites novoguineensis (K.Schum.) Markgr. = Micrechites novoguineensis K.Schum.
- Papuechites warianus (Schltr.) Markgr. = Micrechites warianus (Schltr.) D.J.Middleton
