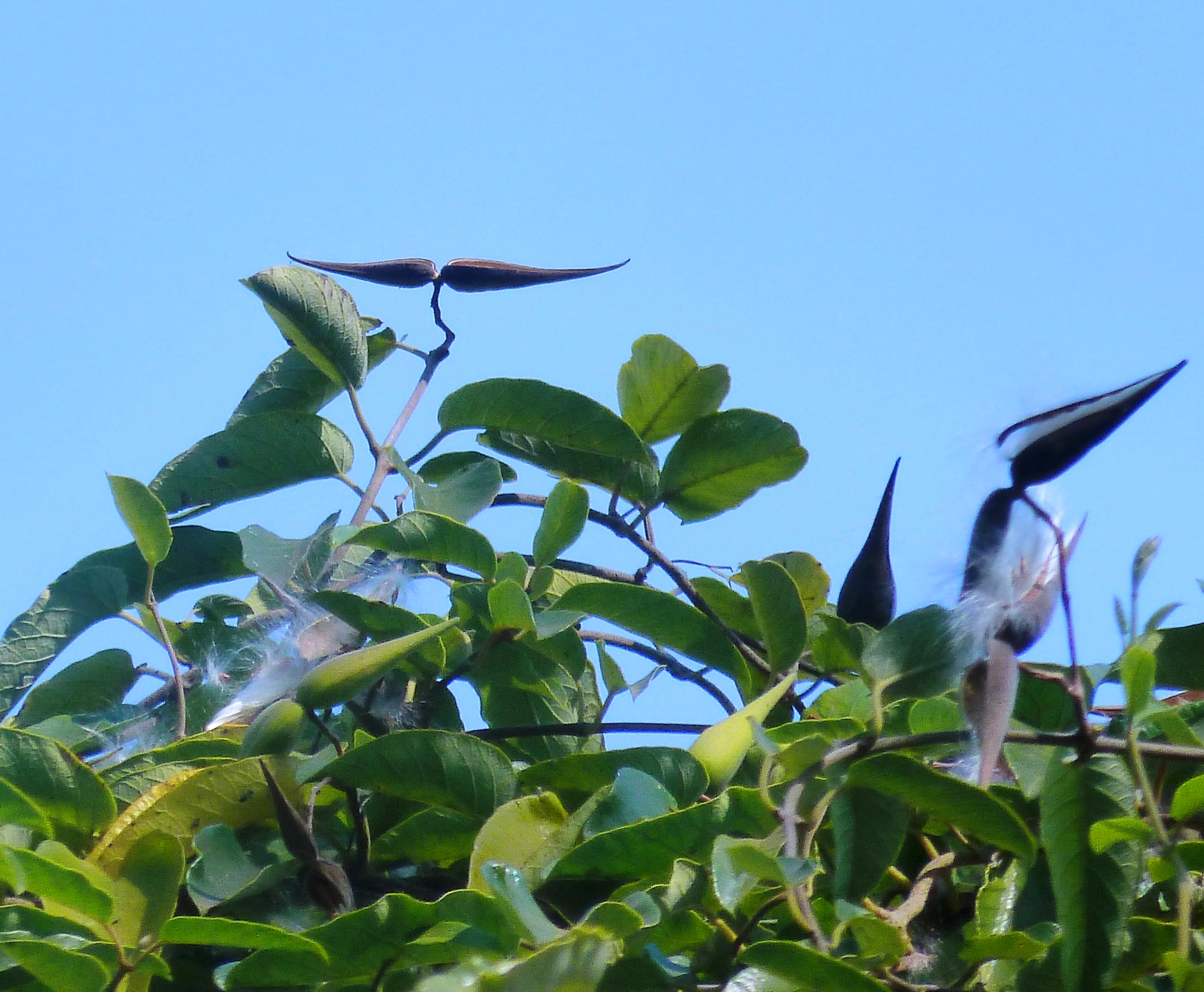
- T. apiculata foliage, fruit and seeds

Scientific classification
- Kingdom: Plantae
- Clade: Tracheophytes
- Clade: Angiosperms
- Clade: Eudicots
- Clade: Asterids
- Order: Gentianales
- Family: Apocynaceae
- Subfamily: Periplocoideae
- Genus: Tacazzea; Decne.

Type species
- Tacazzea venosa Decne.

= Tacazzea =

Genus of plants

Tacazzea is a genus of plants in the family Apocynaceae, first described in 1890. It is native to Africa.

Species

1. Tacazzea africana (Schltr.) N.E.Br. - Kenya
2. Tacazzea apiculata Oliv. - from Tanzania to Angola
3. Tacazzea conferta N.E.Br. - from Ethiopia to Zambia
4. Tacazzea pedicellata K.Schum. - Zaire, Congo-Brazzaville, Gabon
5. Tacazzea rosmarinifolia (Decne.) N.E.Br. - tropical Africa
6. Tacazzea venosa Decne. - Ethiopia

formerly included

moved to other genera (Buckollia, Ischnolepis)

1. Tacazzea natalensis N.E.Br., synonym of Ischnolepis natalensis (Schltr.) Bullock
2. Tacazzea tomentosa E.A.Bruce, synonym of Buckollia tomentosa (E.A.Bruce) Venter & R.L.Verh.

species of uncertain affinities

1. Tacazzea amplifolia
2. Tacazzea bagshawei
3. Tacazzea barteri
4. Tacazzea brazzaeana
5. Tacazzea floribunda
6. Tacazzea laxiflora
7. Tacazzea martini
8. Tacazzea nigritana
9. Tacazzea oleander
10. Tacazzea salicina
11. Tacazzea thollonii
12. Tacazzea verticillata
13. Tacazzea viridis
14. Tacazzea volubilis

== Gallery ==
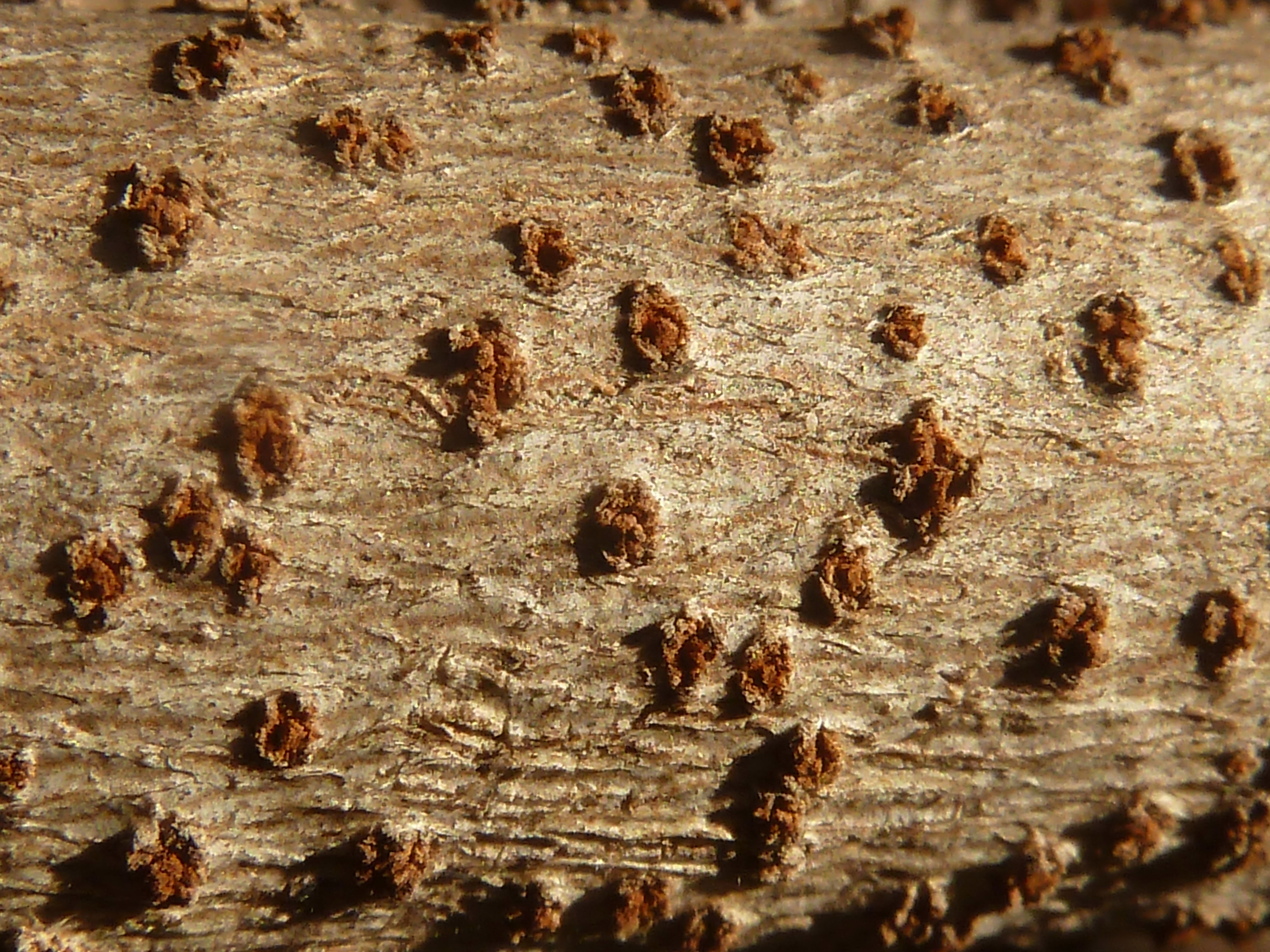
lenticels on bark

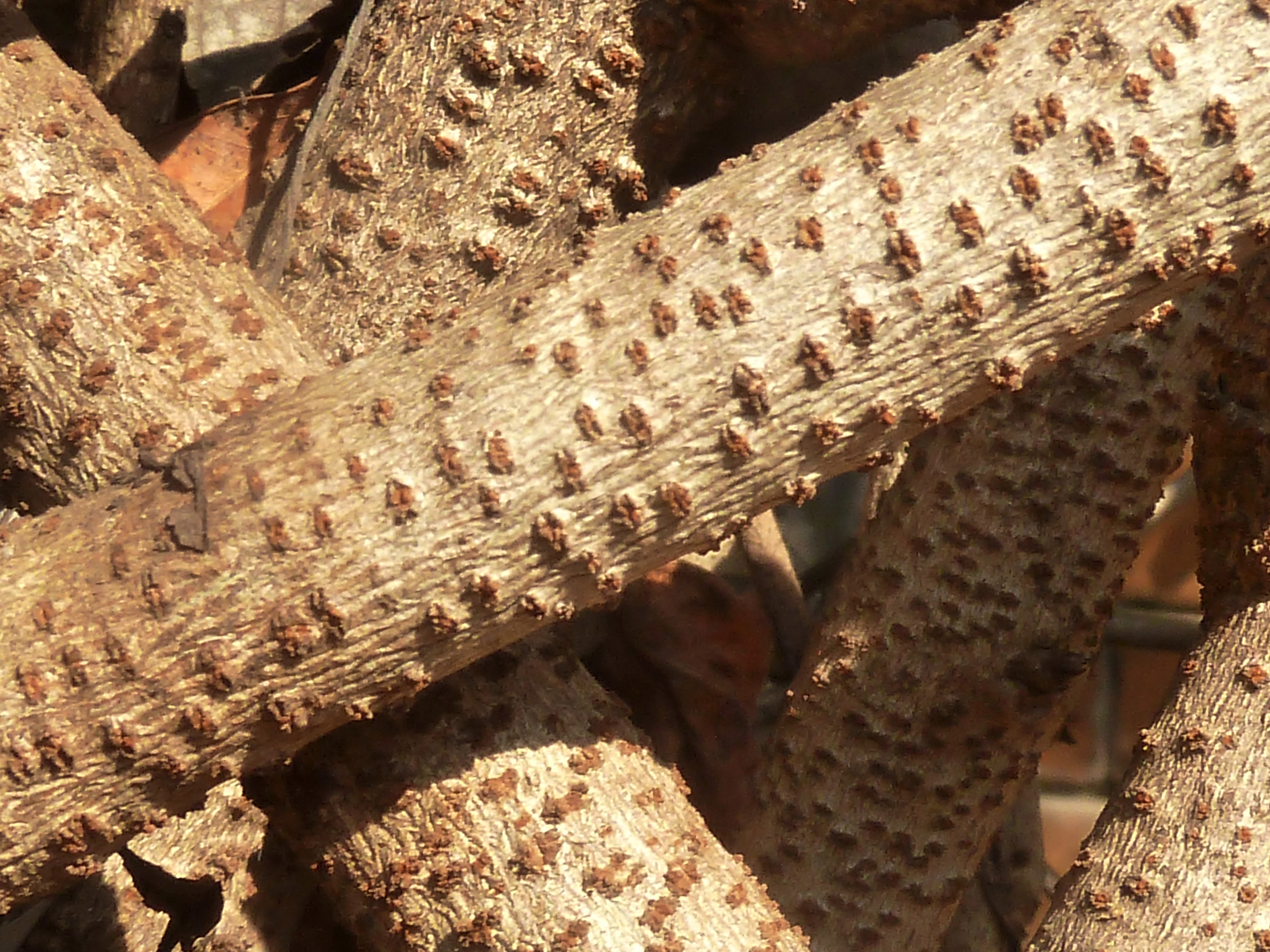
stems

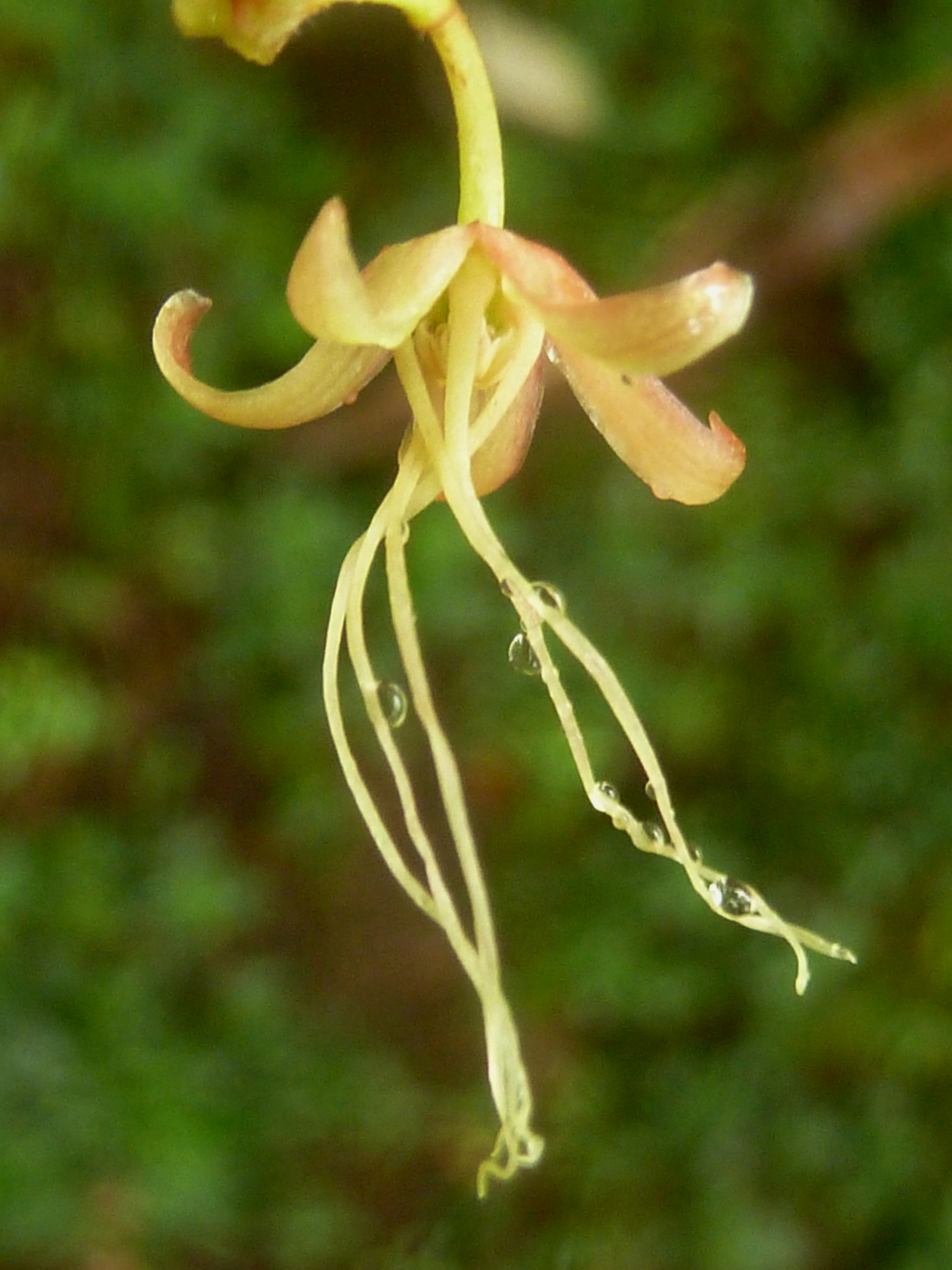
flower

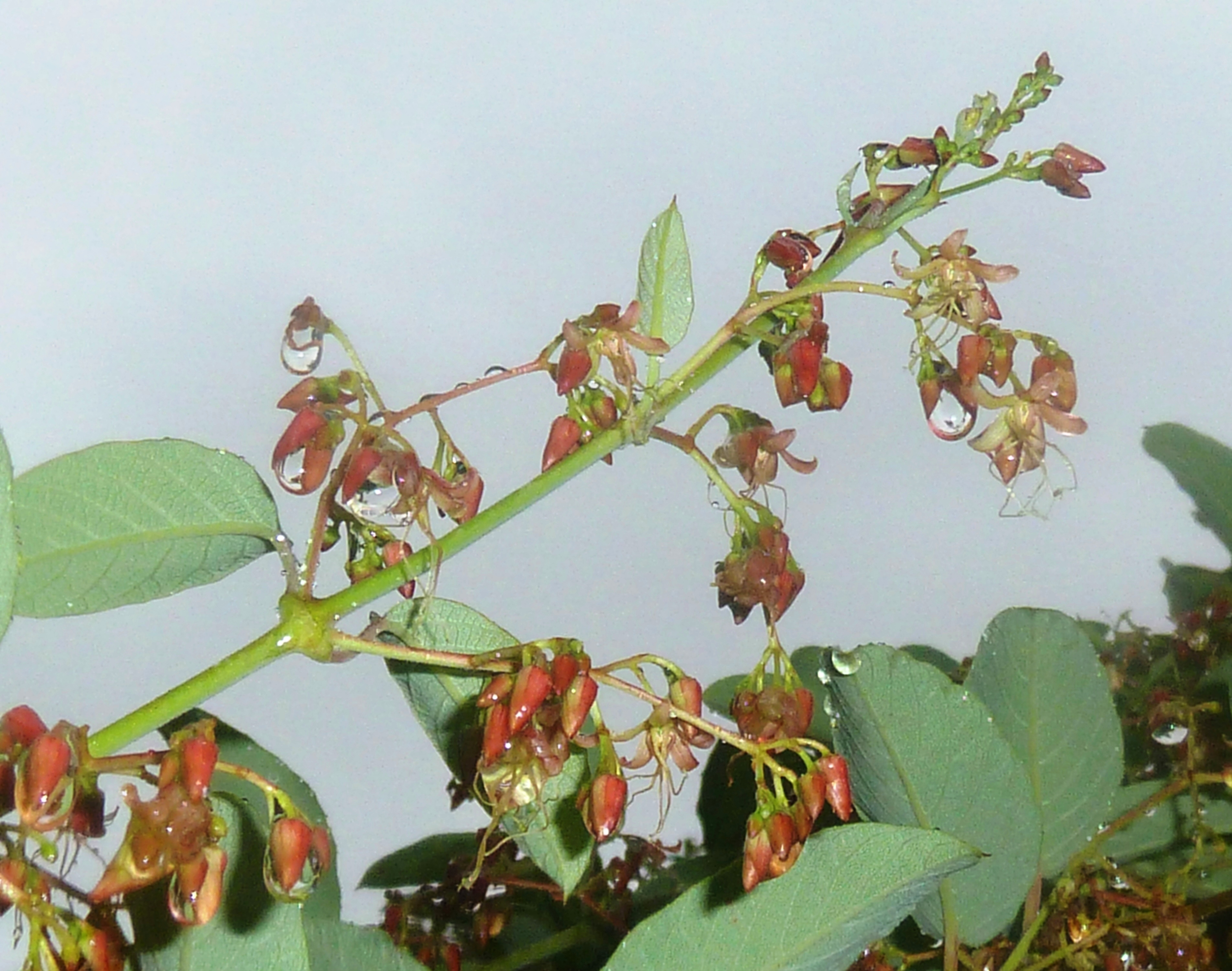
inflorescences
