= Parepigynum =

Conservation status
- Endangered (IUCN 3.1)

Scientific classification
- Kingdom: Plantae
- Clade: Tracheophytes
- Clade: Angiosperms
- Clade: Eudicots
- Clade: Asterids
- Order: Gentianales
- Family: Apocynaceae
- Subfamily: Apocynoideae
- Tribe: Apocyneae
- Genus: Parepigynum; Tsiang & P.T.Li
- Species: P. funingense

Binomial name
- Parepigynum funingense Tsiang & P.T.Li

Genus of plants

Parepigynum is a genus of liana in the family Apocynaceae, first described as a genus in 1973. It contains only one known species, Parepigynum funingense, native to Guizhou and Yunnan Provinces in China.

The species is listed as endangered.
