= Anemotrochus =

Scientific classification
- Kingdom: Plantae
- Clade: Tracheophytes
- Clade: Angiosperms
- Clade: Eudicots
- Clade: Asterids
- Order: Gentianales
- Family: Apocynaceae
- Genus: Anemotrochus; Mangelsdorff, Meve & Liede

Genus of flowering plants

Anemotrochus is a genus of flowering plants belonging to the family Apocynaceae.

Its native range is Caribbean.

Species:

- Anemotrochus eggersii (Schltr.) Mangelsdorff, Meve & Liede
- Anemotrochus viridivenius (Alain) Mangelsdorff, Meve & Liede
- Anemotrochus yamanigueyensis Mangelsdorff, Meve & Liede
