= Austrochthamalia =

Scientific classification
- Kingdom: Plantae
- Clade: Tracheophytes
- Clade: Angiosperms
- Clade: Eudicots
- Clade: Asterids
- Order: Gentianales
- Family: Apocynaceae
- Genus: Austrochthamalia; Morillo & Fontella (2013)

Species
- Austrochthamalia boliviana Morillo & Fontella; Austrochthamalia purpurea (Decne.) Morillo & Fontella; Austrochthamalia teyucuarensis H.A.Keller

Genus of flowering plants

Austrochthamalia is a genus of flowering plants in the dogbane family, Apocynaceae. It includes three species native to South America, ranging from Bolivia to southeastern Brazil and northeastern Argentina.
