= Tetragonocarpus =

Scientific classification
- Kingdom: Plantae
- Clade: Tracheophytes
- Clade: Angiosperms
- Clade: Eudicots
- Clade: Asterids
- Order: Gentianales
- Family: Apocynaceae
- Genus: Tetragonocarpus; Hassk. (1857)
- Species: T. teysmannii

Binomial name
- Tetragonocarpus teysmannii Hassk. (1857)

Synonyms
- Marsdenia teysmannii (Hassk.) Boerl. (1899)

Genus of flowering plants

Tetragonocarpus teysmannii is a species of flowering plant in the dogbane family, Apocynaceae. It is the sole species in genus Tetragonocarpus. It is a climbing subshrub or shrub native to Java and the Lesser Sunda Islands.

The species was first described by Justus Carl Hasskarl in 1857.
