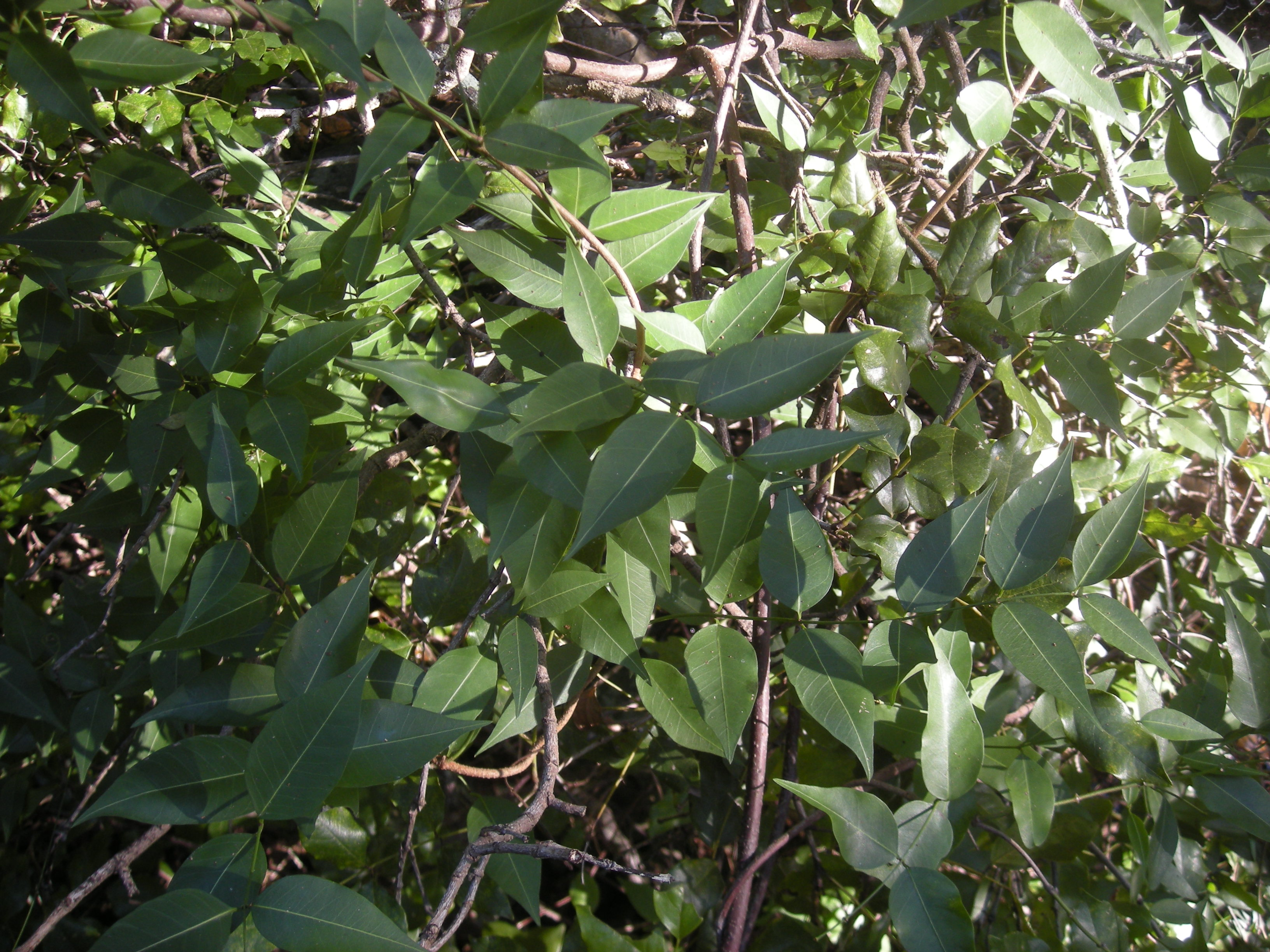
- Gymnanthera oblonga

Scientific classification
- Kingdom: Plantae
- Clade: Tracheophytes
- Clade: Angiosperms
- Clade: Eudicots
- Clade: Asterids
- Order: Gentianales
- Family: Apocynaceae
- Subfamily: Periplocoideae
- Genus: Gymnanthera; R.Br.

= Gymnanthera =

Genus of plants

Gymnanthera is a genus of vines in the family Apocynaceae (previously Asclepiadaceae), first described as a genus in 1810. It is native to China, Southeast Asia, and Australia.

Selected species

- Gymnanthera cunninghamii (Benth.) P.I.Forst. - Enderby Island + Dampier Archipelago of Western Australia
- Gymnanthera oblonga (Burm.f.) P.S.Green - S China (Guangdong, Hainan), Cambodia, Indonesia, Malaysia, New Guinea, Philippines, Thailand, Vietnam; Australia
