= Pacouria =

Scientific classification
- Kingdom: Plantae
- Clade: Tracheophytes
- Clade: Angiosperms
- Clade: Eudicots
- Clade: Asterids
- Order: Gentianales
- Family: Apocynaceae
- Genus: Pacouria; Aubl.

Genus of plants

Pacouria is a genus of flowering plants belonging to the family Apocynaceae.

Its native range is Southern Tropical America.

Species:

- Pacouria boliviensis (Markgr.) A.Chev.
- Pacouria guianensis Aubl.
