= Dewevrella =

Scientific classification
- Kingdom: Plantae
- Clade: Embryophytes
- Clade: Tracheophytes
- Clade: Spermatophytes
- Clade: Angiosperms
- Clade: Eudicots
- Clade: Asterids
- Order: Gentianales
- Family: Apocynaceae
- Subfamily: Apocynoideae
- Tribe: Baisseeae
- Genus: Dewevrella; De Wild.
- Species: D. cochliostema

Binomial name
- Dewevrella cochliostema De Wild.

Genus of plants

Dewevrella is a genus of plants first described in 1907. It contains only one known species, Dewevrella cochliostema, native to central Africa (Gabon, Republic of Congo, Democratic Republic of the Congo).

A second species, Dewevrella congensis Wernham, was described in 1920, based on a type specimen consisting of only a few twigs. Status and placement of this name remain unresolved.
