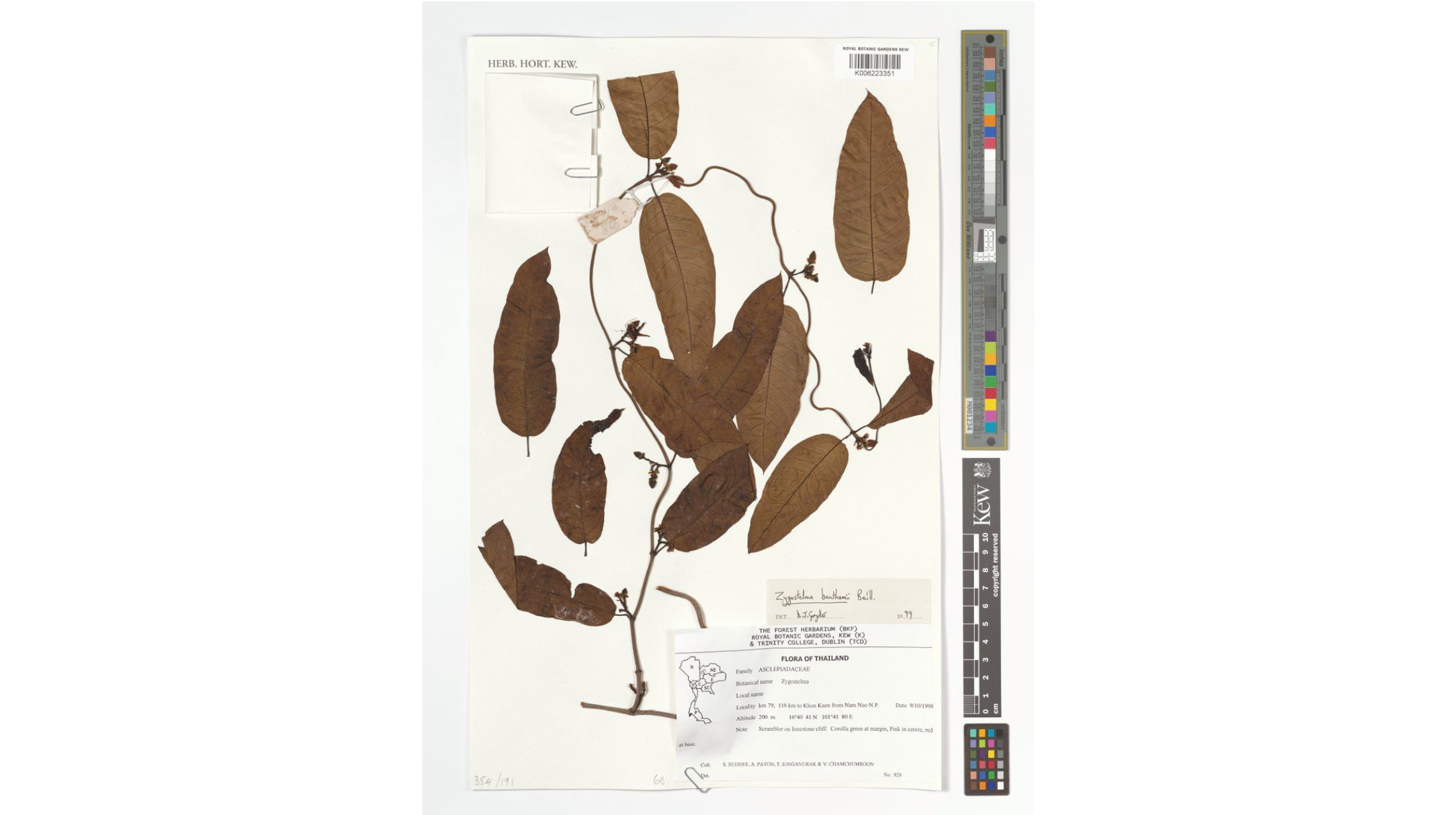

Scientific classification
- Kingdom: Plantae
- Clade: Tracheophytes
- Clade: Angiosperms
- Clade: Eudicots
- Clade: Asterids
- Order: Gentianales
- Family: Apocynaceae
- Subfamily: Periplocoideae
- Genus: Zygostelma; Benth.
- Species: Z. benthamii

Binomial name
- Zygostelma benthamii Baill.

= Zygostelma =

Genus of plants

Zygostelma benthamii is a species of flowering plant in the Periplocoideae subfamily of the family Apocynaceae native to Southeast Asia. It is the only species in the genus Zygostelma and was first formally named in 1890.

The major component of the essential oil of the roots is the fragrant phenolic compound 2-hydroxy-4-methoxybenzaldehyde, a positional isomer of vanillin.

Used in folk medicine in Thailand. Stems analgesic against headache and lumbo-sacral pain. Root as a carminative, heart tonic, antispasmodic and against vertigo.
