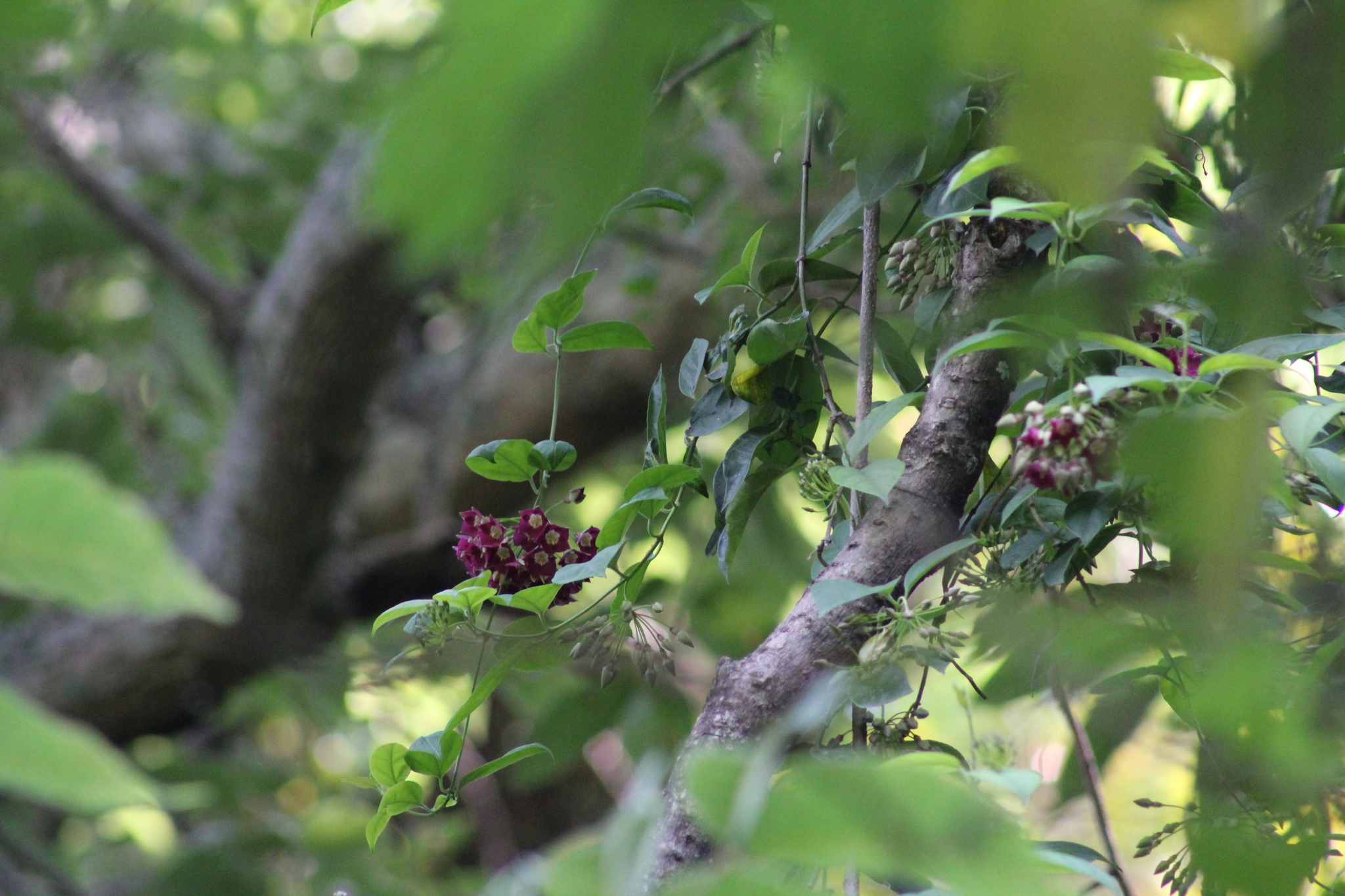
- Thenardia floribunda

Scientific classification
- Kingdom: Plantae
- Clade: Tracheophytes
- Clade: Angiosperms
- Clade: Eudicots
- Clade: Asterids
- Order: Gentianales
- Family: Apocynaceae
- Subfamily: Apocynoideae
- Tribe: Echiteae
- Genus: Thenardia; Kunth

= Thenardia =

Genus of flowering plants

Thenardia is a genus of flowering plants in the family Apocynaceae, first described as a genus in 1819. It is native to Mexico and Honduras.

Species

- Thenardia chiapensis J.K.Williams - Chiapas, Oaxaca, Honduras
- Thenardia floribunda Kunth - Colima, Guerrero, México State, Michoacán, Oaxaca, Jalisco, Morelos
- Thenardia galeottiana Baill. - Chiapas, Oaxaca, Guerrero

Formerly included

- Thenardia corymbosa = Forsteronia schomburgkii
- Thenardia laurifolia = Forsteronia laurifolia
- Thenardia scabra = Parsonsia scabra
- Thenardia umbellata = Forsteronia umbellata
