= Finlaysonia =

Scientific classification
- Kingdom: Plantae
- Clade: Tracheophytes
- Clade: Angiosperms
- Clade: Eudicots
- Clade: Asterids
- Order: Gentianales
- Family: Apocynaceae
- Subfamily: Periplocoideae
- Genus: Finlaysonia; Wall.

Species
- See text

Synonyms
- Atherolepis Hook.f.; Gongylosperma King & Gamble; Gurua Buch.-Ham. ex Wight; Meladerma Kerr; Stelmacrypton Baill.; Stelmocrypton H.E.Baillon, 1889

Genus of Apocynaceae plants

Finlaysonia is a genus of flowering plants in the dogbane family Apocynaceae, found from Sri Lanka, India, through Southeast Asia, New Guinea, northern Australia, the Philippines, and Palau. They tend to be vines or climbers and prefer to live on limestone, alongside rivers, or in mangrove swamps.

== Species ==
Species currently accepted by The Plant List are as follows:

- Finlaysonia curtisii (King & Gamble) Venter
- Finlaysonia insularum (King & Gamble) Venter
- Finlaysonia khasiana (Kurz) Venter
- Finlaysonia lanuginosa (Ridl.) Venter
- Finlaysonia obovata Wall.
- Finlaysonia pierrei (Costantin) Venter
- Finlaysonia wallichii (Wight) Venter
