= Phyllanthera =

Scientific classification
- Kingdom: Plantae
- Clade: Tracheophytes
- Clade: Angiosperms
- Clade: Eudicots
- Clade: Asterids
- Order: Gentianales
- Family: Apocynaceae
- Genus: Phyllanthera; Blume

Genus of plants

Phyllanthera is a genus of flowering plants belonging to the family Apocynaceae.

Its native range is Melanesia to Northeastern Australia.

== Species ==
Species:

- Phyllanthera bifida Blume
- Phyllanthera grayi (P.I.Forst.) Venter
- Phyllanthera lancifolia (P.I.Forst.) Venter
- Phyllanthera multinervosa (P.I.Forst.) Venter
- Phyllanthera nymanii (K.Schum.) Venter
- Phyllanthera papillata (P.I.Forst.) Venter
- Phyllanthera perakensis King & Gamble
- Phyllanthera piforsteriana W.N.Takeuchi
- Phyllanthera sumatrana (Blume) Venter
- Phyllanthera takeuchiana P.I.Forst.
