= Epistemma =

Scientific classification
- Kingdom: Plantae
- Clade: Tracheophytes
- Clade: Angiosperms
- Clade: Eudicots
- Clade: Asterids
- Order: Gentianales
- Family: Apocynaceae
- Genus: Epistemma; D.V.Field & J.B.Hall

Genus of plants

Epistemma is a genus of flowering plants belonging to the family Apocynaceae.

Its native range is Western Tropical Africa to Uganda.

Species:

- Epistemma assianum D.V.Field & J.B.Hall
- Epistemma decurrens H.Huber
- Epistemma neuerburgii Eb.Fisch. & Venter
- Epistemma rupestre H.Huber
