= Sarcorrhiza =

Scientific classification
- Kingdom: Plantae
- Clade: Tracheophytes
- Clade: Angiosperms
- Clade: Eudicots
- Clade: Asterids
- Order: Gentianales
- Family: Apocynaceae
- Genus: Sarcorrhiza; Bullock

Genus of plants

Sarcorrhiza is a genus of flowering plants belonging to the family Apocynaceae.

Its native range is Ivory Coast, Congo, Eastern Tanzania.

== Species ==
Species:

- Sarcorrhiza epiphytica Bullock
