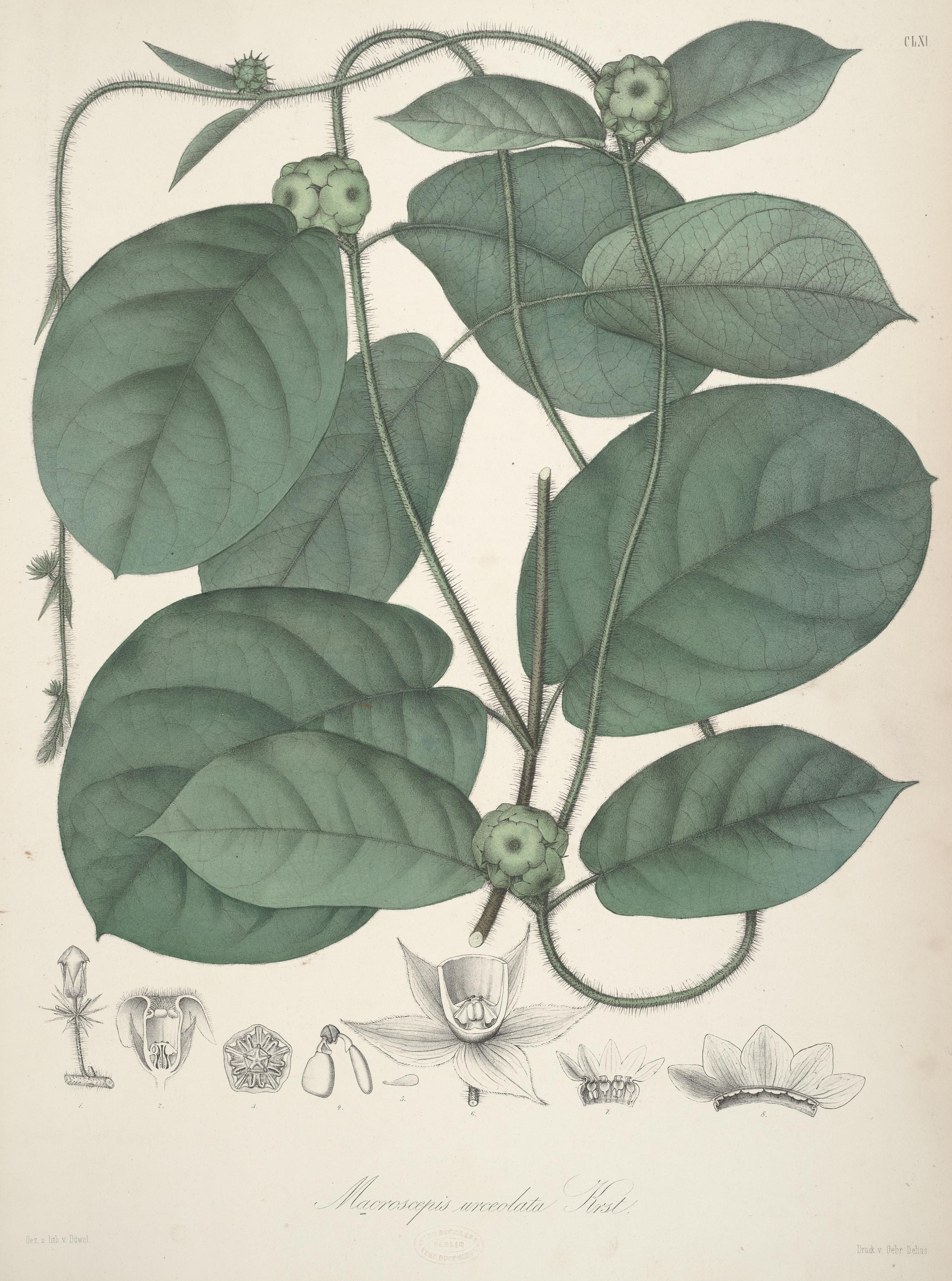
- Macroscepis urceolata

Scientific classification
- Kingdom: Plantae
- Clade: Tracheophytes
- Clade: Angiosperms
- Clade: Eudicots
- Clade: Asterids
- Order: Gentianales
- Family: Apocynaceae
- Subfamily: Asclepiadoideae
- Tribe: Asclepiadeae
- Genus: Macroscepis; Kunth

Type species
- Macroscepis obovata (syn of M. diademata) Kunth

= Macroscepis =

Genus of plants

Macroscepis is a genus of plants in the family Apocynaceae, first described as a genus in 1819. It is native to Latin America and the West Indies.

Species

1. Macroscepis aurea E.Fourn. - S Brazil, NW Argentina
2. Macroscepis diademata (Ker Gawl.) W.D.Stevens - Mexico
3. Macroscepis elliptica N.E.Br. - Brazil
4. Macroscepis hirsuta (Vahl) Schltr. - Trinidad, Panama, Costa Rica, Colombia, Ecuador, Venezuela
5. Macroscepis magnifica Malme - Serra de Caracol in São Paulo
6. Macroscepis pleistantha Donn.Sm. - Chiapas, Guatemala, El Salvador, Honduras, Nicaragua, Costa Rica
7. Macroscepis selloana E.Fourn. - Brazil
8. Macroscepis urceolata H.Karst. - Colombia, Venezuela

formerly included

moved to Gonolobus, Matelea, Oxypetalum

1. Macroscepis dutrae now Gonolobus dutrae
2. Macroscepis longiflora now Matelea longiflora
3. Macroscepis retusa now Oxypetalum retusum
