= Maclaudia =

Conservation status
- Near Threatened (IUCN 3.1)

Scientific classification
- Kingdom: Plantae
- Clade: Tracheophytes
- Clade: Angiosperms
- Clade: Eudicots
- Clade: Asterids
- Order: Gentianales
- Family: Apocynaceae
- Genus: Maclaudia; Venter & R.L.Verh.
- Species: M. felixii

Binomial name
- Maclaudia felixii Venter & R.L.Verh.

Species of plants

Maclaudia is a monotypic genus of flowering plants belonging to the family Apocynaceae. It only contains one known species, Maclaudia felixii Venter & R.L.Verh.

Its native range is western and western central Tropical Africa. It is found in the countries of Cameroon and Guinea.

The genus name of Maclaudia is in honour of Charles Maclaud (1866–1933), French doctor and zoologist; plant and animal collector. The Latin specific epithet of felixii refers to botanist Henri Jacques-Félix, (1907-2008) (Jacq.-Fél.) who is also honoured in the naming of Pitcairnia feliciana. In Paris, Botanists Venter & R.L.Verh. had been studying unknown specimens of plants collected by Maclaud in 1907 from Guinea. In 1937, Henri Jacques-Félix found more specimens of the same plant. Venter & R.L.Verh. realised that they had found a new genus and species and then named it after the 2 plant collectors from the region. Both genus and species were then first described and published by Venter & R.L.Verh. in Bot. J. Linn. Soc. Vol.115 on pages 58–59 in 1994.

It grows in forests and savannah.

It is threatened by farming activities and mining & quarrying actions.
