= Telectadium =

Scientific classification
- Kingdom: Plantae
- Clade: Tracheophytes
- Clade: Angiosperms
- Clade: Eudicots
- Clade: Asterids
- Order: Gentianales
- Family: Apocynaceae
- Genus: Telectadium; Baill.

Genus of flowering plants

Telectadium is a genus of flowering plants belonging to the family Apocynaceae.

Its native range is Indo-China.

Species:

- Telectadium dongnaiense Pierre ex Costantin
- Telectadium edule Baill.
- Telectadium linearicarpum Pierre
