= Atherandra =

Scientific classification
- Kingdom: Plantae
- Clade: Tracheophytes
- Clade: Angiosperms
- Clade: Eudicots
- Clade: Asterids
- Order: Gentianales
- Family: Apocynaceae
- Genus: Atherandra; Decne.
- Species: A. acutifolia

Binomial name
- Atherandra acutifolia Decne.

Genus of flowering plants

Atherandra is a genus of flowering plants belonging to the family Apocynaceae. The only species is Atherandra acutifolia.

Its native range is Indo-China to Western Malesia.
