= Myriopteron =

Scientific classification
- Kingdom: Plantae
- Clade: Tracheophytes
- Clade: Angiosperms
- Clade: Eudicots
- Clade: Asterids
- Order: Gentianales
- Family: Apocynaceae
- Subfamily: Periplocoideae
- Genus: Myriopteron; Griff.
- Species: M. extensum

Binomial name
- Myriopteron extensum (Wight) K. Schum.

Synonyms
- Myriopteron paniculatum Griff.; Streptocaulon extensum Wight & Arn.; Streptocaulon extensum var. paniculatum (Griff.) Kurz; Streptocaulon horsfieldii Miq.; Myriopteron horsfieldii (Miq.) Hook.f.

Genus of flowering plants

Myriopteron is a species of plants in the family Apocynaceae first described as a genus in 1844. It contains only one known species, Myriopteron extensum, native to Southeast Asia, India, and southern China. It can be found in Bangladesh.
