= Ectadium =

Scientific classification
- Kingdom: Plantae
- Clade: Embryophytes
- Clade: Tracheophytes
- Clade: Spermatophytes
- Clade: Angiosperms
- Clade: Eudicots
- Clade: Asterids
- Order: Gentianales
- Family: Apocynaceae
- Genus: Ectadium; E.Mey.

Genus of plants

Ectadium is a genus of flowering plants belonging to the family Apocynaceae. Its native range is from Namibia to South Africa.

Species:

- Ectadium rotundifolium (H.Huber) Venter & Kotze
- Ectadium virgatum E.Mey.
