= Rudolf Schlechter =

German botanist (1872–1925)

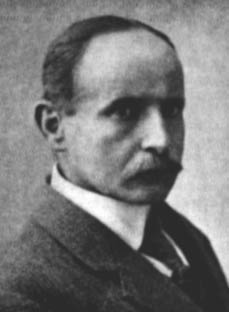
- Rudolf Schlechter
- Born: Friedrich Richard Rudolf Schlechter; 16 October 1872; Berlin, Germany
- Died: 16 November 1925 (aged 53); Berlin, Germany
- Scientific career
- Fields: Botanist
- Author abbrev. (zoology): Schltr.

Friedrich Richard Rudolf Schlechter (16 October 1872 – 16 November 1925) was a German taxonomist, botanist, and author of several works on orchids.

He went on botanical expeditions in Africa, Indonesia, New Guinea, South and Central America and Australia.

His vast herbarium was destroyed during the bombing of Berlin in 1945.

== Early life ==
Rudolf Schlechter was born on 16 October 1872 in Berlin, the third of six children; his father Hugo Schlechter was a lithographer. After finishing school at the Friedrich Wilhelm Gymnasium he started a horticulture education at a gardening market. He later worked at the University of Berlin garden. There he worked as an assistant till the autumn of 1891. His brother was Max Schlechter (1874–1960), was a German trader and collector of natural history specimens.

== Career ==
Schlechter began his career of botanical fieldwork by leaving Europe in 1891 to journey to Africa; he later traveled across Indonesia and Australia. Throughout his career he has focused on expanding his research collection of orchids. He was a leader of expeditions in German Africa, investigating the Caoutchouc industry, but continually collecting plant specimens. He also lived extensively in German New Guinea in the first decade of the new century. Before World War I he settled in Berlin, marrying his wife Alexandra Schlechter and becoming curator of Berlin's botanical garden in Dahlem. He is estimated to have proposed one thousand new species in the family Orchidaceae alone. In his 1901-1902 expedition he discovered 230 orchid species, while on his 1907-1910 expedition he discovered 1,100 additional orchid species.

== Works ==
- Die Orchideen von Deutsch-Neu-Guinea, 1914
- Die Orchideen, ihre Beschreibung, Kultur und Züchtung, 1915
- Orchideologiae sino-japonicae prodromus, 1919
- Orchidaceae Powellianae Panamenses, 1922
- Die Orchideenflora der südamerikanischen Kordillerenstaaten (written with Rudolf Mansfeld), 1919–1929
- Monographie und Iconographie der Orchideen Europas und des Mittelmeergebietes (written with G. Keller), 1925–1943
- Blütenanalysen neuer Orchideen (published by R. Mansfeld), 1930–1934

== Honours ==
Several genera of plants have been named in his honour, Schlechterella (in the Apocynaceae family),Schlechterina (in the Passifloraceae family), and also Rudolfiella Hoehne, (in the Orchidaceae family).
