= Pentopetia =

Scientific classification
- Kingdom: Plantae
- Clade: Tracheophytes
- Clade: Angiosperms
- Clade: Eudicots
- Clade: Asterids
- Order: Gentianales
- Family: Apocynaceae
- Subfamily: Periplocoideae
- Genus: Pentopetia; Decne.

Type species
- Pentopetia androsaemifolia Decne.

Genus of flowering plants

Pentopetia is a plant genus in the family Apocynaceae, first described as a genus in 1844.

The genus should not be confused with the related genus with a similar name, Petopentia.

Species

all are endemic to Madagascar

1. Pentopetia androsaemifolia Decne.
2. Pentopetia bidens Jum. & H.Perrier
3. Pentopetia boivinii Costantin & Gallaud
4. Pentopetia cotoneaster Decne.
5. Pentopetia dasynema Choux
6. Pentopetia elastica Jum. & H.Perrier
7. Pentopetia glaberrima Choux
8. Pentopetia grevei (Baill.) Venter
9. Pentopetia lutea Klack. & Civeyrel
10. Pentopetia mollis Jum. & H. Perrier
11. Pentopetia ovalifolia (Costantin & Gallaud) Klack.
12. Pentopetia pinnata Costantin & Gallaud

Formerly included

Moved to other genera (Cryptolepis, Ischnolepis, Secamone)

1. P. albicans now Cryptolepis albicans
2. P. graminifolia now Ischnolepis graminifolia
3. P. linearifolia now Secamone geayi
4. P. natalensis now Ischnolepis natalensis
