= Alfred Riocreux =

French painter

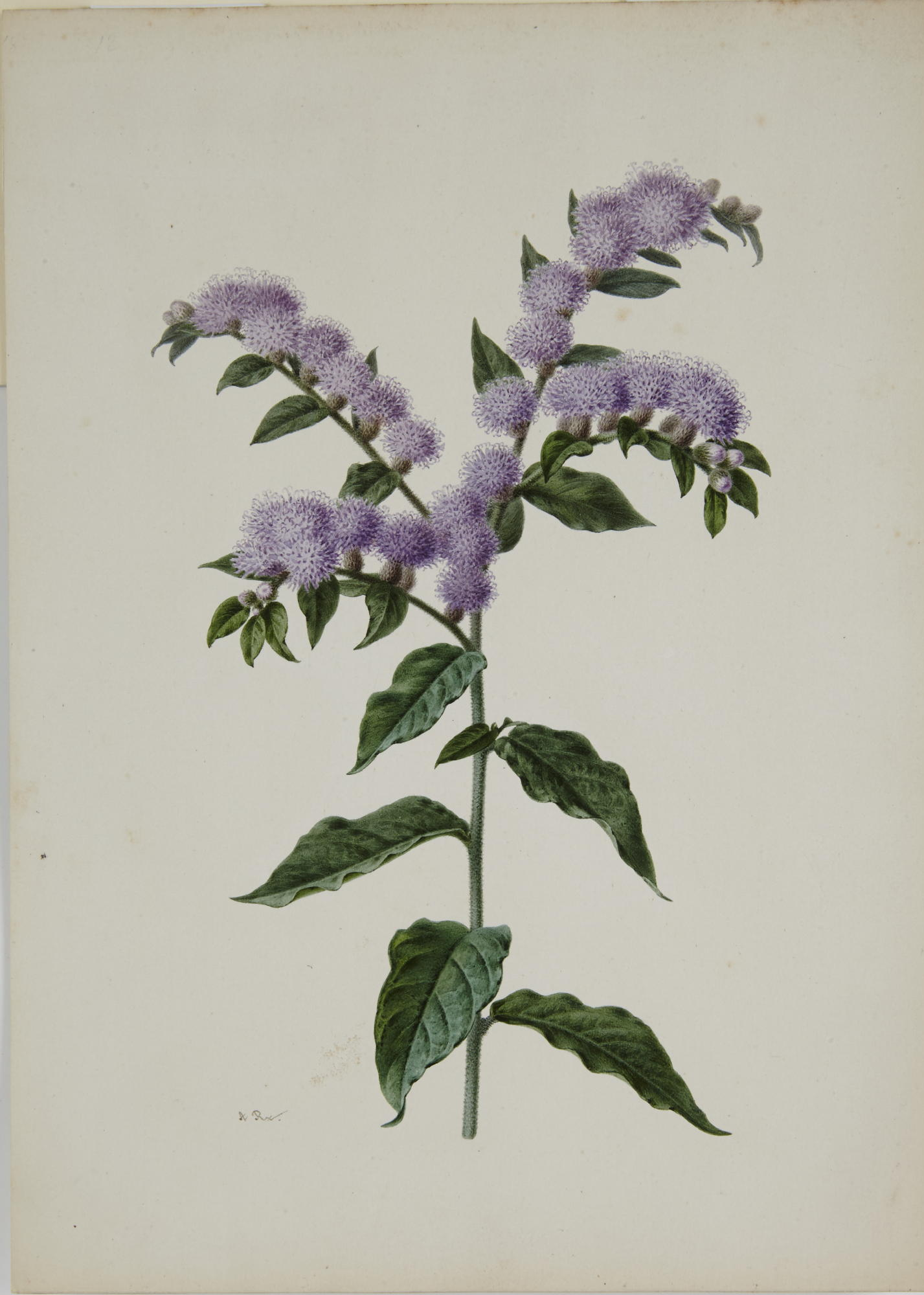
Cyrtocymura scorpioides by Alfred Riocreux

Alfred Riocreux (1820 Sevres - 1912 Paris), a French scientific illustrator and described as the "most distinguished botanical artist of his day".

Alfred's father was Denis-Désiré Riocreux (1791–1872), a porcelain painter at the 'Manufacture Royale de Porcelain' at Sèvres, and one of Pierre-Joseph Redouté's (1759–1840) last pupils. His failing eyesight obliged him to abandon porcelain painting, and in 1815 to take up the position of Keeper of the Musee de Ceramique at Sèvres. Tutored by his father, Riocreux soon became skilled in drawing and painting. Alfred also worked at the Sèvres factory and his work, which included botanical drawings, was exhibited at the Paris Salon in 1837, 1838 and 1855. In 1870 he was awarded the Chevalier de la Legion d'Honneur. In 1856 he became a member of the Société Impériale et Centrale d’Horticulture.

His interest in botanical illustration was furthered through meeting the botanist Adolphe Theodore Brongniart. It seems probable that Brongniart first introduced Riocreux to the Museum d'Histoire Naturelle, where he befriended the botanist and author Joseph Decaisne, who later named the genus Riocreuxia in his honour, and in turn, introduced him to Gustave Thuret. He also used Riocreux's talents to illustrate the nine volumes of "Le Jardin Fruitier du Muséum" (1858–1875). This led to more illustrating for other botanists, such as Étienne Fiacre Louis Raoul's "Choix de Plantes de la Nouvelle-Zélande" (1846), W.B. Hemsley's "Handbook of Hardy Trees, Shrubs, and Herbaceous Plants" (1873) and Gustave Thuret's "Notes Algologiques" (1876–1880) and "Etudes Phycologiques" (1878), the latter being highly acclaimed. His illustrations were also used in the journals "La Revue Horticole and Annales des Sciences Naturelles". Édouard André chose Riocreux to arrange the engravings for C.S. Sargent's "Silva of North America", in twelve volumes from 1890 to 1899. Working from Paris, Riocreux supervised the production of the six hundred plates drawn in pencil by Charles Edward Faxon (1846–1918) and engraved by Philibert and Eugene Picart. Thirty of Riocreux's original plates for "Choix de Plantes de la Nouvelle-Zélande" are held by the Herbarium at Kew. He was an early exponent of using a microscope for botanical dissections. His work may be seen at the Fitzwilliam Museum in Cambridge.

A collection of 86 drawings by Riocreux (four of which are shown below) was once held by the Arnold Arboretum at Harvard University - C.S. Sargent was its first director during 1872–1927. The collection was described as "exceedingly rare and exquisitely illustrated...bound in crushed Levant, beautifully tooled, no date".

== Gallery ==
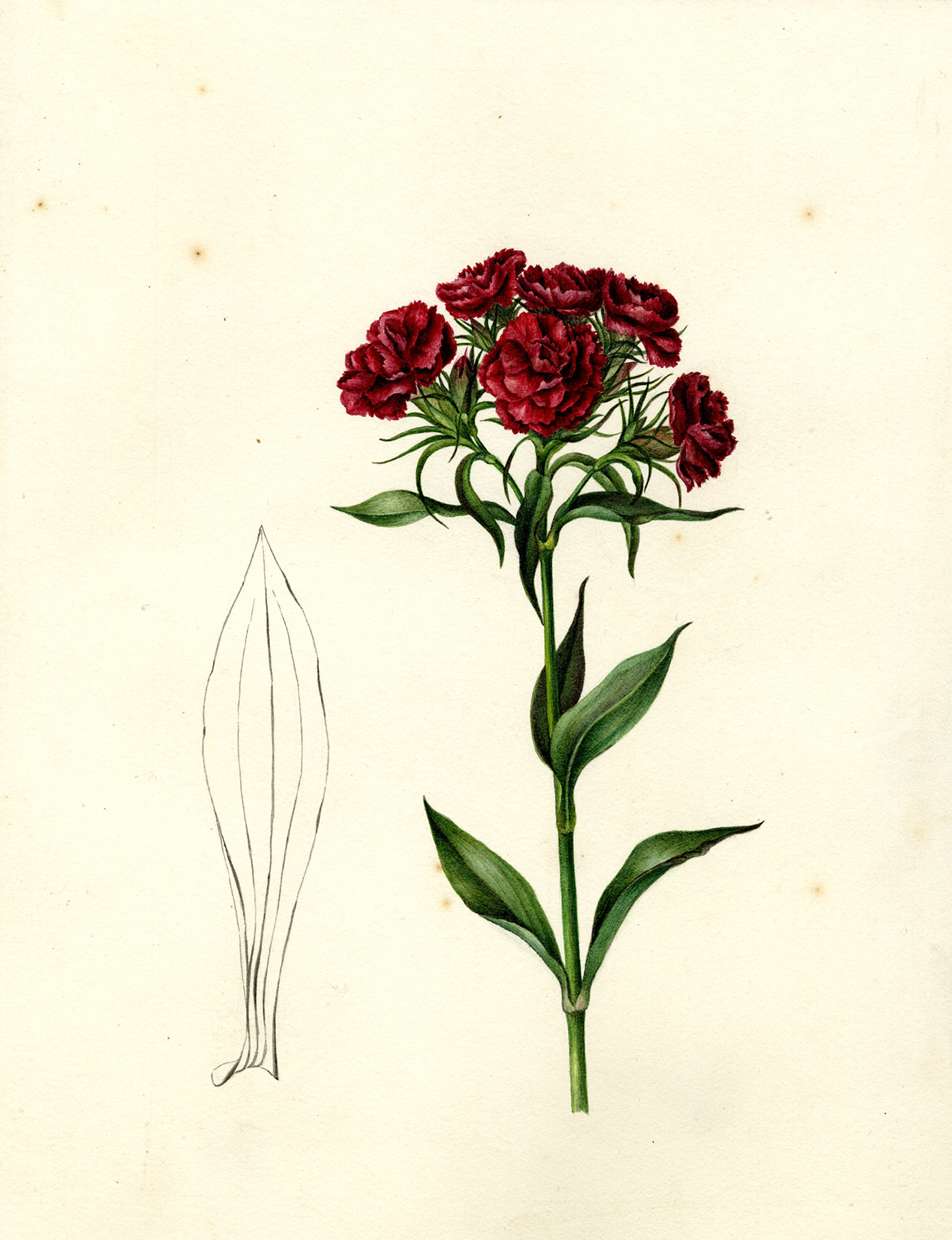
Dianthus barbatus

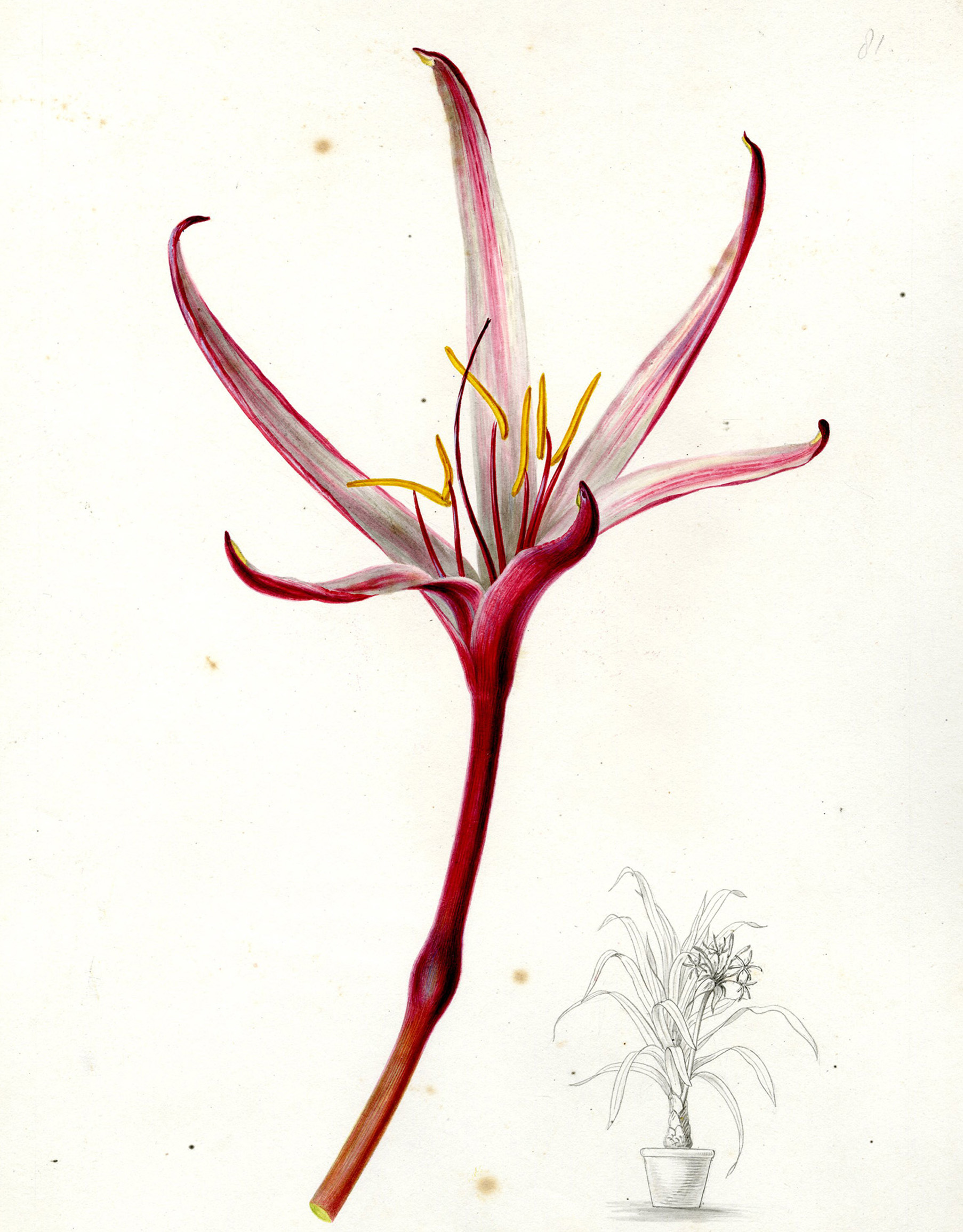
Crinum amabile

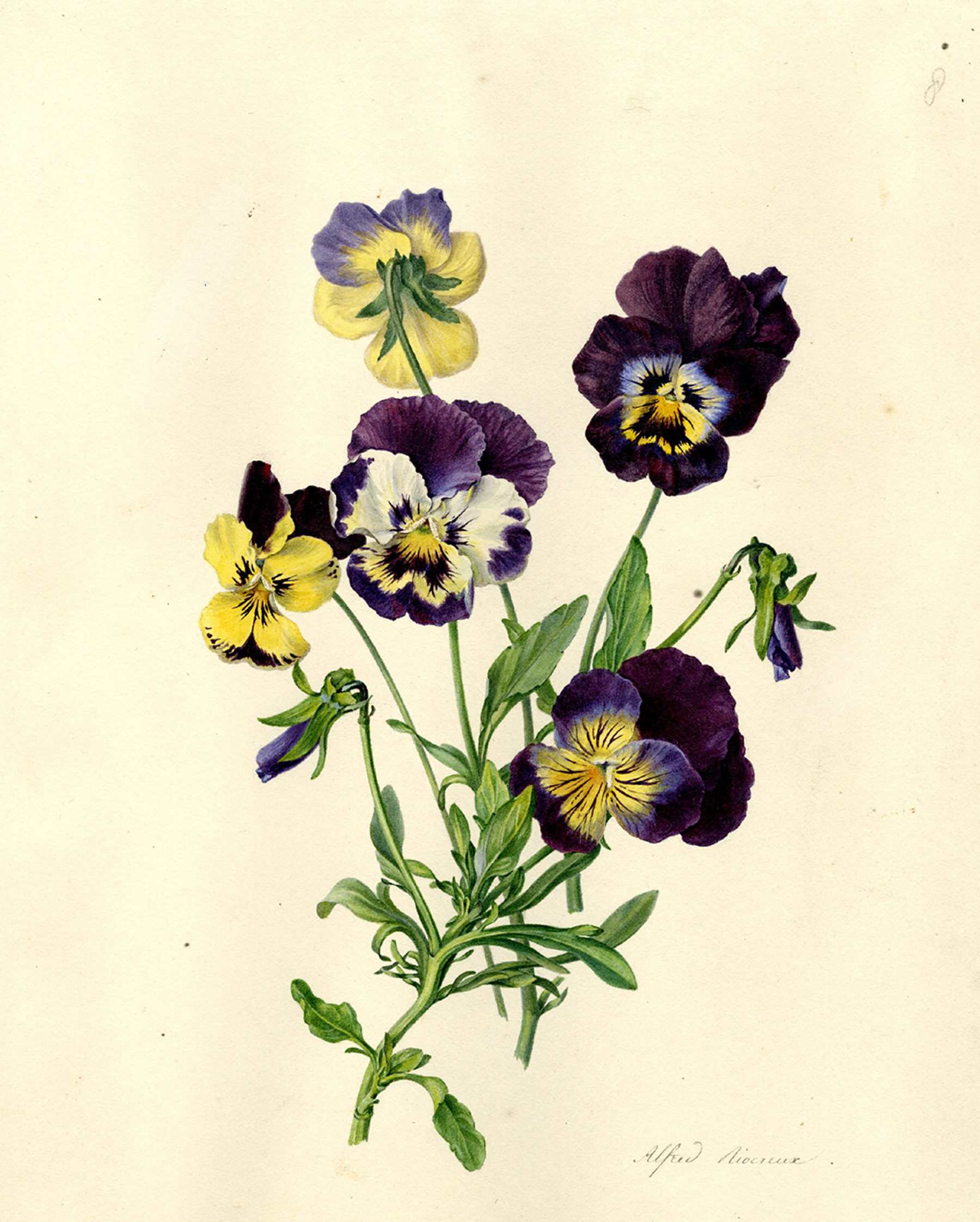
Viola (Garden Varieties) of lutea and curtisii

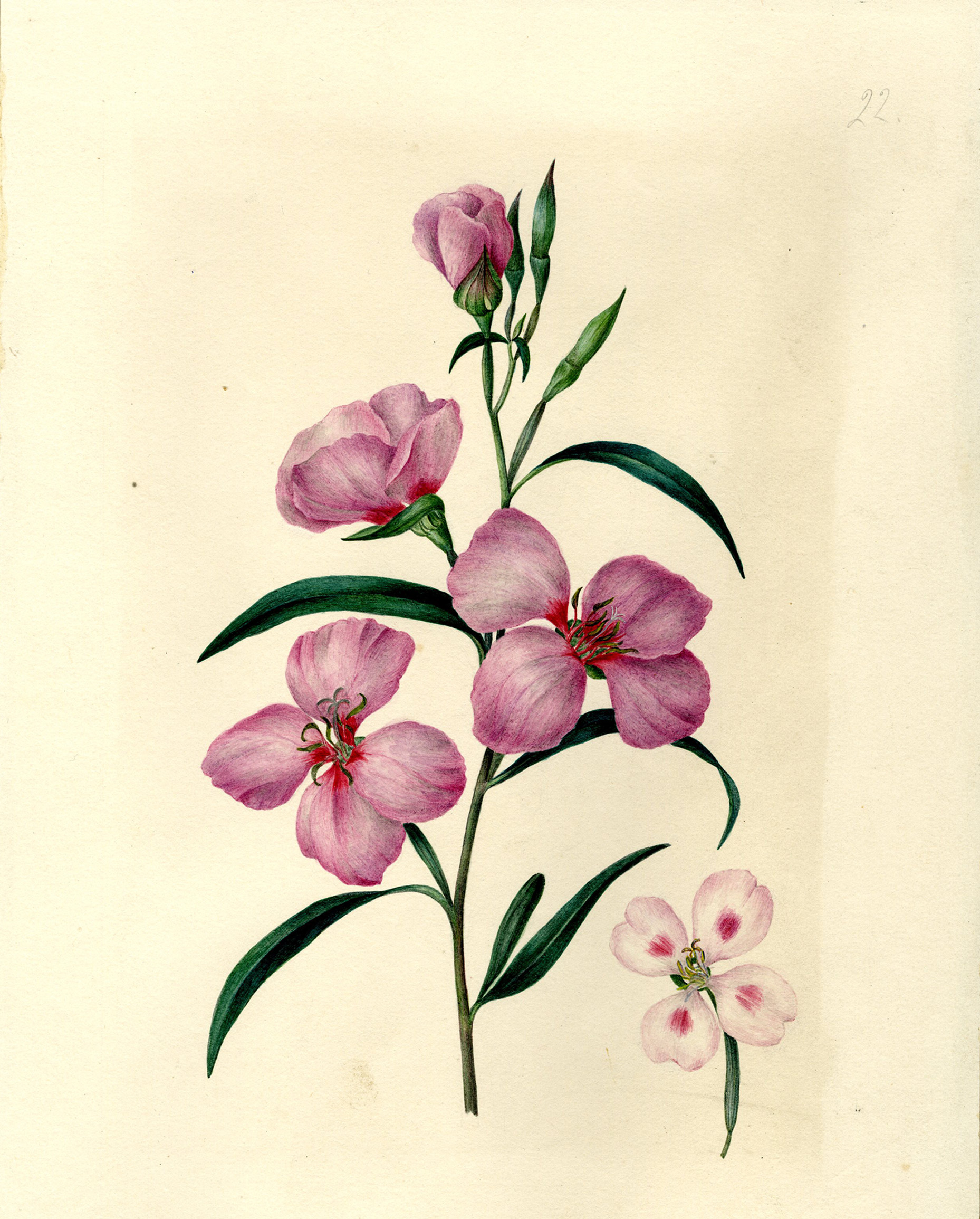
Clarkia rubicunda
