= Lepinia taitensis =

Conservation status
- Endangered (IUCN 3.1)

Scientific classification
- Kingdom: Plantae
- Clade: Tracheophytes
- Clade: Angiosperms
- Clade: Eudicots
- Clade: Asterids
- Order: Gentianales
- Family: Apocynaceae
- Genus: Lepinia
- Species: L. taitensis

Binomial name
- Lepinia taitensis Decne. (1849)

Species of plant

Lepinia taitensis is a species of plant in the family Apocynaceae. It is a shrub or tree endemic to the islands of Moorea and Tahiti in the Society Islands of French Polynesia. The IUCN Red List assesses the species as Endangered.

The species was described in 1849 by Joseph Decaisne.
