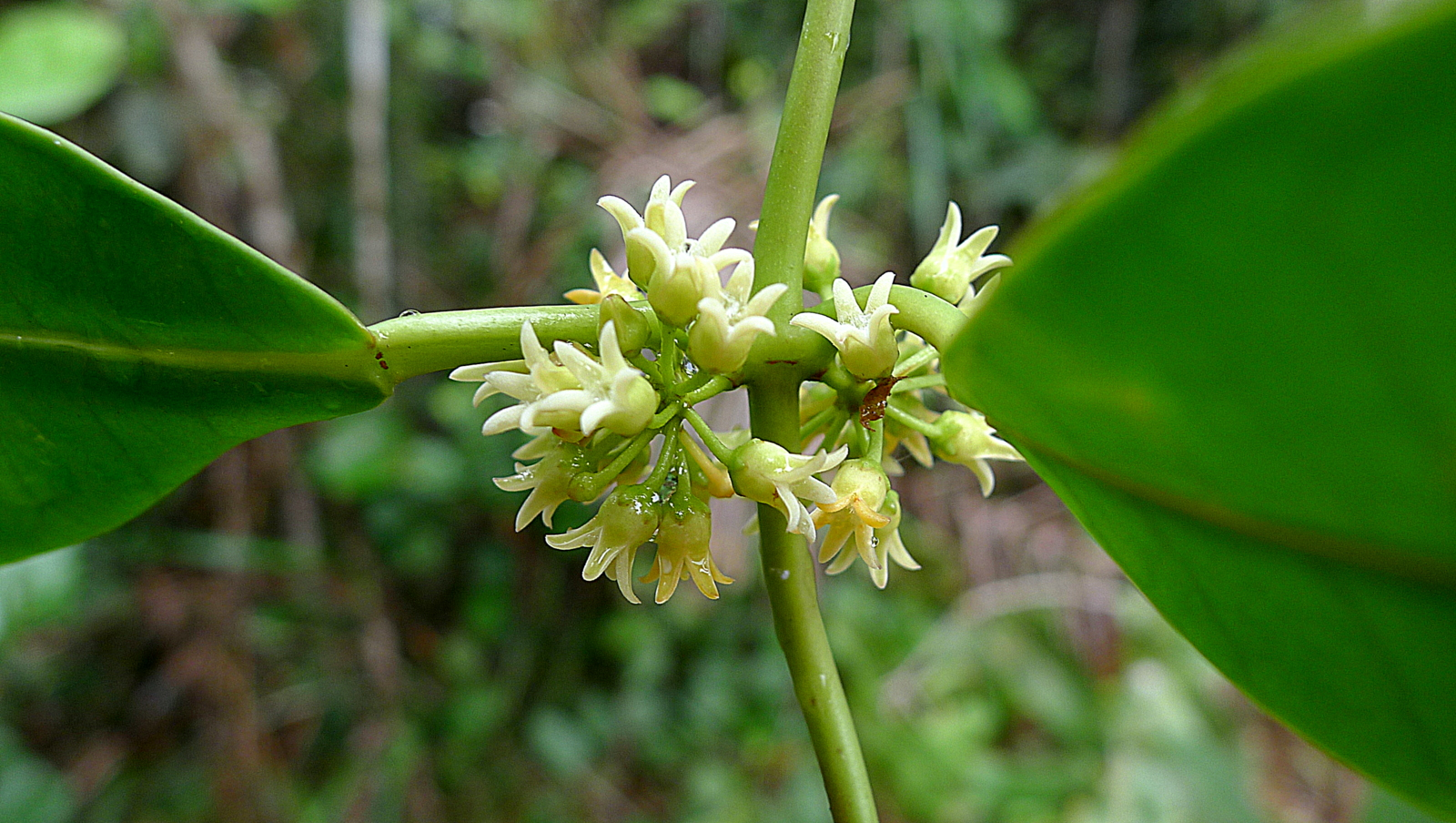
- Peplonia bradeana

Scientific classification
- Kingdom: Plantae
- Clade: Embryophytes
- Clade: Tracheophytes
- Clade: Spermatophytes
- Clade: Angiosperms
- Clade: Eudicots
- Clade: Asterids
- Order: Gentianales
- Family: Apocynaceae
- Subfamily: Asclepiadoideae
- Tribe: Asclepiadeae
- Genus: Peplonia; Decne. (1844)

Type species
- Peplonia nitida Decne.

Synonyms
- Gonioanthela Malme (1927); Macroditassa Malme (1927)

= Peplonia =

Genus of flowering plants

Peplonia is a group of plants in the family Apocynaceae first described as a genus in 1844. The entire genus is endemic to Brazil.

== Species ==
Nine species are accepted:

1. Peplonia adnata (E.Fourn.) U.C.S.Silva & Rapini – Peru, Bolivia, Paraguay, and Brazil
2. Peplonia asteria (Vell.) Fontella & E.A. Schwarz - Brazil
3. Peplonia axillaris (Vell.) Fontella & Rapini - Brazil
4. Peplonia bradeana (Fontella & E.A. Schwarz) Fontella & Rapini - Espírito Santo
5. Peplonia hatschbachii (Fontella & de Lamare) Fontella & Rapini - Paraná
6. Peplonia hilariana E.Fourn. - Brazil
7. Peplonia macrophylla (Malme) U.C.S.Silva & Rapini - Brazil (Bahia to Rio de Janeiro)
8. Peplonia organensis (E.Fourn.) Fontella & Rapini - Brazil
9. Peplonia riedelii (E.Fourn.) Fontella & Rapini - Rio de Janeiro

formerly included

moved to Blepharodon

- Peplonia amazonica Benth., synonym of Blepharodon amazonicum (Benth.) Fontella & Marquete
