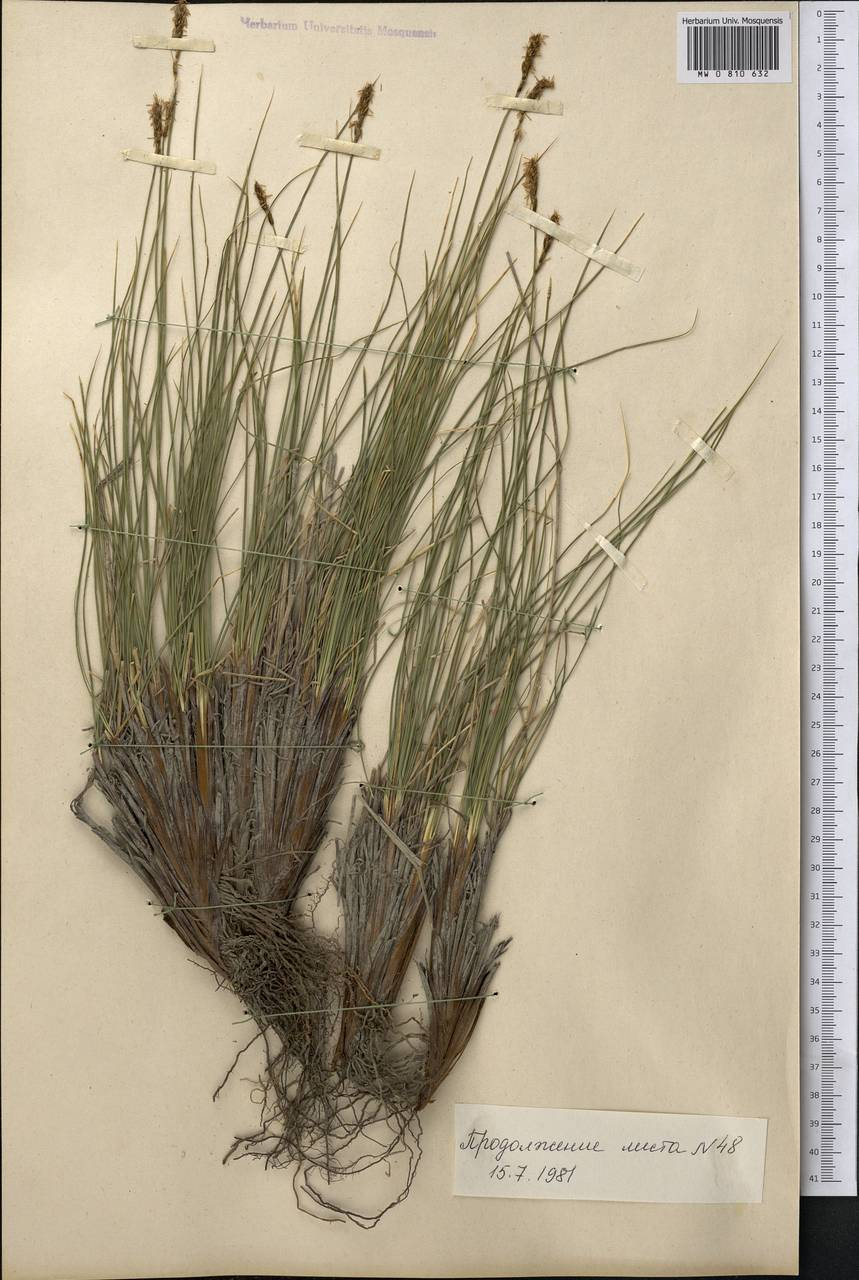

Scientific classification
- Kingdom: Plantae
- Clade: Tracheophytes
- Clade: Angiosperms
- Clade: Monocots
- Clade: Commelinids
- Order: Poales
- Family: Cyperaceae
- Genus: Carex
- Species: C. capillifolia

Binomial name
- Carex capillifolia (Decne.) S.R.Zhang

Synonyms
- Carex ninae Melnikov; Carex ovczinnikovii (T.V.Egorova) Melnikov; Carex owerinii Melnikov; Elyna capillifolia Decne.; Elyna macrolepis (Meinsh.) Fomin & Woronow; Elyna spicata Boiss.; Kobresia brunnescens Boeckeler; Kobresia capillifolia (Decne.) C.B.Clarke; Kobresia capilliformis N.A.Ivanova; Kobresia elata Boeckeler; Kobresia macrolepis Meinsh.; Kobresia ovczinnikovii T.V.Egorova; Kobresia thomsonii Maxim. ex N.A.Ivanova; Kobresia yushuensis Y.C.Yang

= Carex capillifolia =

Species of sedge

Carex capillifolia is a tussock-forming perennial in the family Cyperaceae. It is endemic to the Caucasus in the north east south to Afghanistan through the Himalaya north to Mongolia and into central parts of China including the provinces of Qinghai and Xinjiang.

== See also ==
- List of Carex species
