= Dubitatio =

Scientific classification
- Kingdom: Fungi
- Division: Ascomycota
- Class: Dothideomycetes
- Order: Pleosporales
- Family: Massariaceae
- Genus: Dubitatio; Speg. (1882)

Type species
- Dubitatio dubitationum Speg. (1882)

Synonyms
- Spegazzinula Sacc. (1883); Passerinula Sacc. (1875)

Genus of fungi

Dubitatio is a fungal genus in the family Massariaceae. According to the 2007 Outline of Ascomycota, the placement of the genus in this family is uncertain. This is a monotypic genus, containing the single species Dubitatio dubitationum, found in temperate South America.
