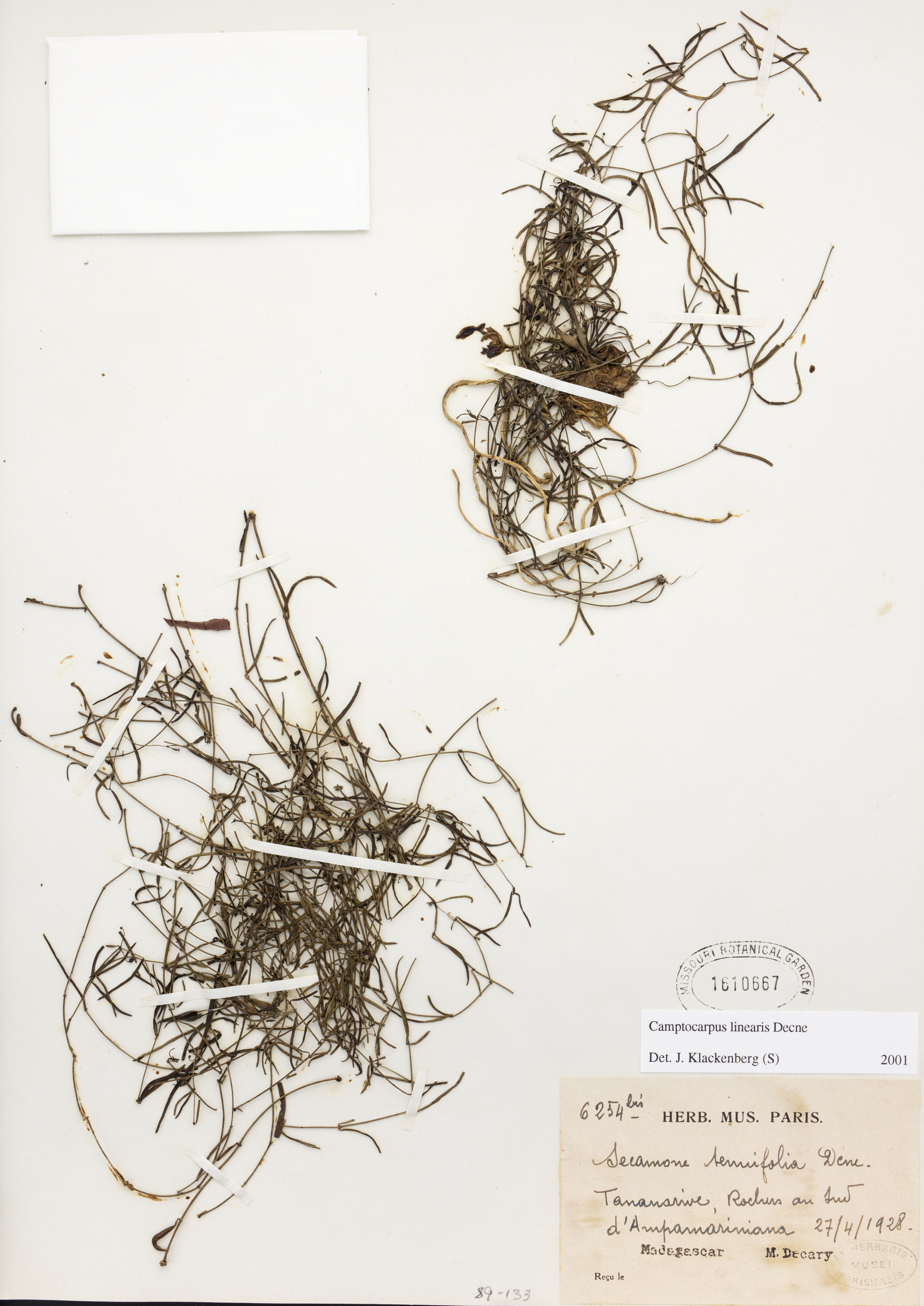
- Photograph of a herbarium specimen of Camptocarpus linearis

Scientific classification
- Kingdom: Plantae
- Clade: Tracheophytes
- Clade: Angiosperms
- Clade: Eudicots
- Clade: Asterids
- Order: Gentianales
- Family: Apocynaceae
- Genus: Camptocarpus
- Species: C. linearis

Binomial name
- Camptocarpus linearis Decne.

Synonyms
- Symphytonema lineare (Decne.) Choux; Tanulepis linearis (Decne.) Choux

= Camptocarpus linearis =

Species of flowering plant

Camptocarpus linearis is a species of plant in the Apocynaceae family. It is endemic to Madagascar. Joseph Decaisne, the botanist who first formally described the species, named it after its narrow (linearis in Latin) leaves.

== Description ==
It is a shrub-like plant that is woody only at the base. It has notably slender stems that are 0.5–1 millimeters in diameter. The length between leaves or branches is about 2.5 centimeters. Its lance-shaped, very narrow, linear leaves are 1 millimeter wide by 2.5 centimeters long. The tips and base of the leaves taper to a point. Its short, rudimentary petioles are 2 millimeters long. Its short, sparse Inflorescences occur at the junction between the leaves and stem and have 1–3 flowers. The inflorescences have very short peduncles that are 1 millimeters long, and pedicels that 2 millimeters long. Its very small flowers are 1 millimeter long.

=== Reproductive biology ===
The pollen of Camptocarpus linearis is shed as permanent tetrads.

=== Distribution and habitat ===
It has been observed growing at elevations of 900 to 1600 meters.
