= Decaisnella =

Scientific classification
- Kingdom: Fungi
- Division: Ascomycota
- Class: Dothideomycetes
- Order: Pleosporales
- Family: Massariaceae
- Genus: Decaisnella; Fabre

Type species
- Decaisnella spectabilis Fabre

Genus of fungi

Decaisnella is a genus of fungi in the family Massariaceae.

The genus name of Decaisnella is in honour of Joseph Decaisne (1807–1882), who was a French botanist and agronomist.

The genus was circumscribed by Jean-Henri Casimir Fabre in Ann. Sci. Nat. Bot. ser.6 Vol.9 on page 112 in 1879.
