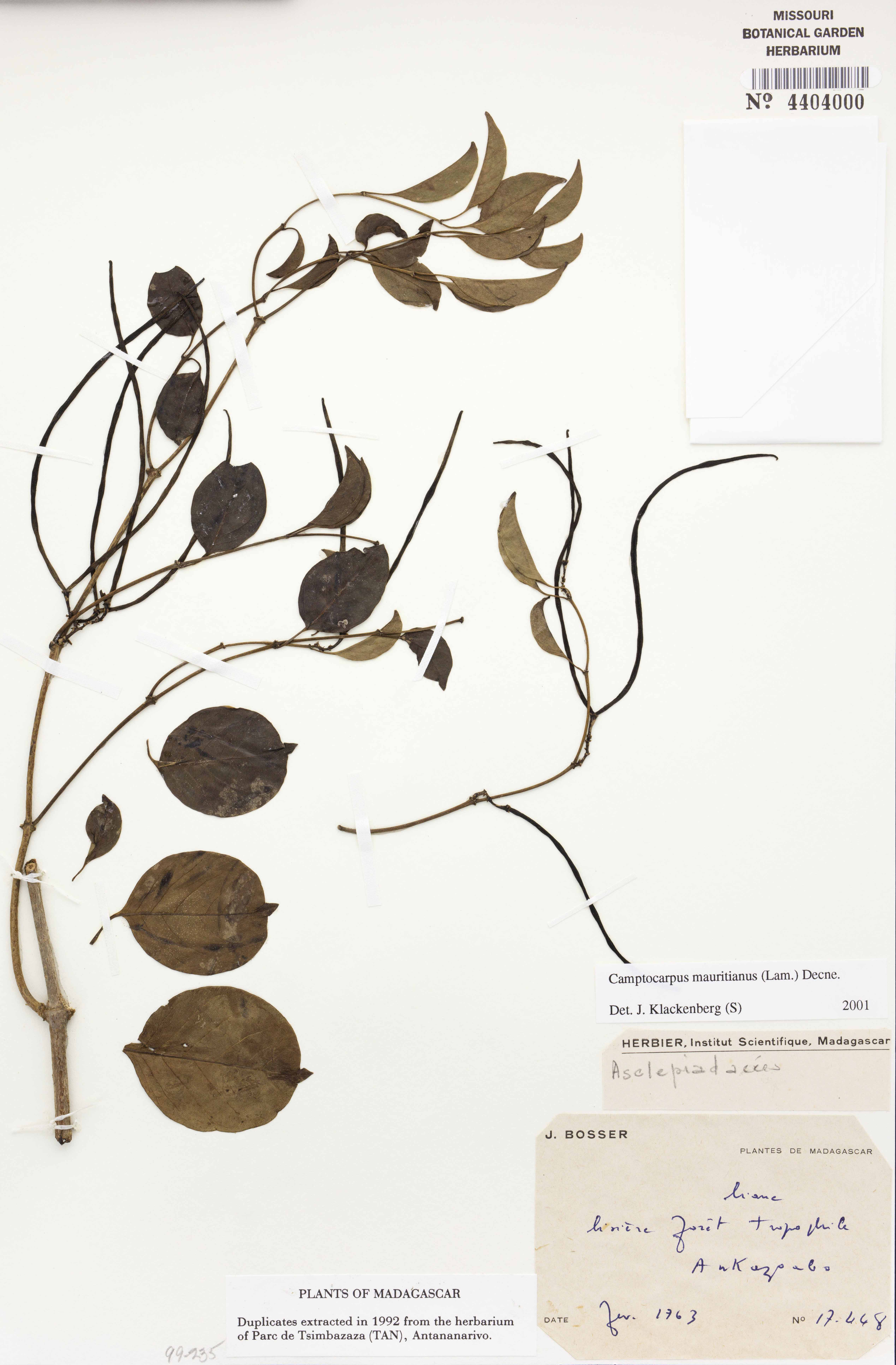
- Photograph of a herbarium specimen of Camptocarpus mauritianus

Scientific classification
- Kingdom: Plantae
- Clade: Tracheophytes
- Clade: Angiosperms
- Clade: Eudicots
- Clade: Asterids
- Order: Gentianales
- Family: Apocynaceae
- Genus: Camptocarpus
- Species: C. mauritianus

Binomial name
- Camptocarpus mauritianus (Lam.) Decne.

Synonyms
- Cynanchum mauritianum Lam.; Secamone mauritiana (Lam.) G.Don; Streptocaulon mauritianum (Lam.) G.Don; Camptocarpus bojeri Jum. & H.Perrier; Camptocarpus bojerianus Decne.; Camptocarpus mauritianus var. madagascariensis Costantin & Gallaud; Periploca mauritiana Poir.; Vincetoxicum mauritianum (Poir.) Kuntze

= Camptocarpus mauritianus =

Species of flowering plant

Camptocarpus mauritianus is a species of plant in the Apocynaceae family. It is native to Comoros, Madagascar and Réunion. Jean-Baptiste Lamarck, the naturalist who first formally described the species named it, using the synonym Cynanchum mauritianum, after the region of the Indian Ocean that includes the island of Mauritius, although the type specimen he examined did not list a specific location.

== Description ==
It is a climbing plant. Its hairless, oval to egg-shaped to lance-shaped leaves are 5–6 by 1.6–1.8 centimeters. The tips of its leaves sometimes come to a long, tapering point. The leaves have 4–16 pairs of secondary veins emanating from their midribs. Its petioles are 6 millimeters long. At the junction between the petioles and the stem are tufts of red hairs that remain after the leaves have fallen. Its Inflorescences occur at the junction between the leaves and stem, or at the ends of stems and branches. The inflorescences have peduncles that are 1 millimeters long, and pedicels, including secondary and tertiary pedicels, that 5 millimeters long. Its flowers are 9 millimeter wide when open. Its flowers have 5 sepals that are 1.5 millimeters long. Inside, but alternating with the sepals are 5 flattened glandular scales, about as wide as the sepals. Three of the five scales are larger than the other two. The 5 slightly firm petals form a bell-shaped structure with free lobes about halfway up their length that overlap from left to right. The flowers have a ring-like structure between the petals and its stamen called a corona. The foot of the corona is fused to the base of the petals. Its corona has thread-like lobes that are bent backwards, and occur in pairs that alternate with the petals. Its hairless stamen are closely spaced with filaments that are almost as wide as the anthers. The red, triangular anthers are 0.6 millimeters long and positioned close together above the pistils. The pistils have expanded stigmas. Its slender, tapering fruit open horizontally.

=== Reproductive biology ===
The pollen of Camptocarpus linearis is shed as permanent tetrads.

=== Distribution and habitat ===
It has been observed growing in dry to mildly humid habitats at elevations up to 1999 meters.

== Uses ==
It has been reported as being used as a medicinal plant in Mauritius.
