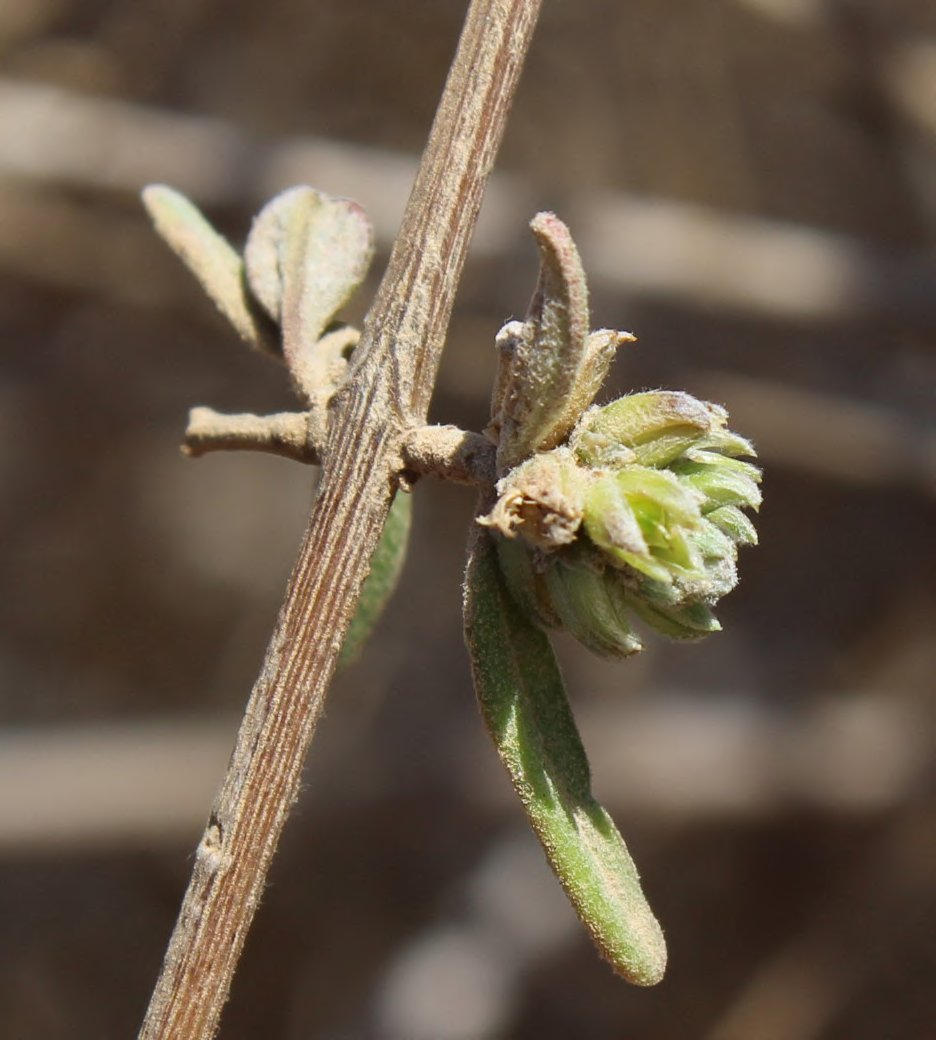
- Botanical illustration of Camptocarpus crassifolius

Scientific classification
- Kingdom: Plantae
- Clade: Tracheophytes
- Clade: Angiosperms
- Clade: Eudicots
- Clade: Asterids
- Order: Gentianales
- Family: Apocynaceae
- Genus: Camptocarpus
- Species: C. crassifolius

Binomial name
- Camptocarpus crassifolius Decne.

Synonyms
- Symphytonema crassifolium (Decne.) Choux; Tanulepis crassifolia (Decne.) Choux; Camptocarpus madagascariensis (Schltr.) Venter; Symphytonema madagascariense Schltr.; Tanulepis madagascariensis (Schltr.) Choux

= Camptocarpus crassifolius =

Species of flowering plant

Camptocarpus crassifolius is a species of plant in the Apocynaceae family. It is endemic to Madagascar. Joseph Decaisne, the botanist who first formally described the species, named it after its thick (crassus in Latin) leaves (-folius in Latin).

== Description ==
It is a climbing plant. The upper portion of the stems are wavy and slender with diameters of 0.6–0.8 millimeters while the lower portions are firmer and thicker with diameters up to 1.2 millimeters. The length between leaves or branches is 5–8 centimeters. Its wedge to egg-shaped leaves are 25–30 by 6–8 millimeters with the broader part closer to the tip. The tips of its leaves are blunt with a short sharp point that is 0.2 millimeters long. The base of the leaves are variably tapering from 10° to 25°. Its short petioles are 2.5 millimeters long. Its Inflorescences occur at the junction between the leaves and stem and have rudimentary branches with 1–3 flowers. The inflorescences have very short peduncles that are 3 millimeters long, and flowers that are 4 millimeters long. Its flowers have 5 overlapping, rounded sepals. The bottom third of its 5 petals are fused at their base forming tube. The tooth-shaped, broad lobes of the petals have blunt tips and do not reach the top of the stamens.

=== Reproductive biology ===
The pollen of Camptocarpus crassifolius is shed as permanent tetrads.

=== Distribution and habitat ===
It has been observed growing at elevations of up to 450 meters.
