= Asterostemma =

Asterostemma may refer to:

- Asterostemma depressa, an extinct species of mammals in the family Chlamyphoridae
- Asterostemma (plant), a genus of flowering plants in the family Apocynaceae
