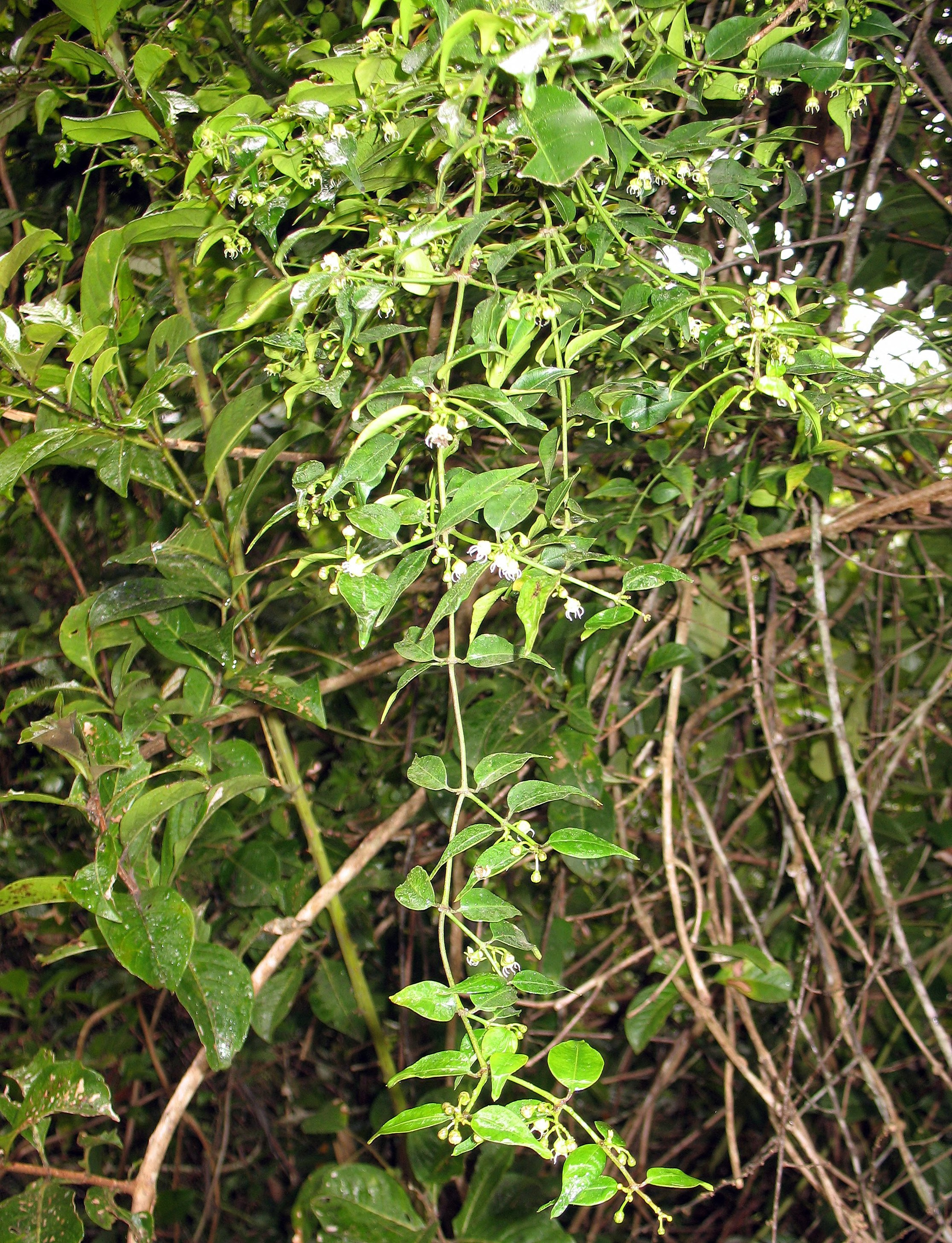
- Camptocarpus acuminatus

Scientific classification
- Kingdom: Plantae
- Clade: Tracheophytes
- Clade: Angiosperms
- Clade: Eudicots
- Clade: Asterids
- Order: Gentianales
- Family: Apocynaceae
- Genus: Camptocarpus; Decne.

= Camptocarpus =

Genus of flowering plants

Camptocarpus is a genus of flowering plants belonging to the family Apocynaceae. (Note: Not to be confused with the beetle genus Camptocarpus)

Its native range is the islands of the western Indian Ocean – Comoros, Madagascar, Rodrigues, and Réunion.

Species:

- Camptocarpus acuminatus (Choux) Venter
- Camptocarpus cornutus Klack.
- Camptocarpus crassifolius Decne.
- Camptocarpus decaryi (Choux) Venter
- Camptocarpus lanceolatus Klack.
- Camptocarpus linearis Decne.
- Camptocarpus mauritianus (Lam.) Decne.
- Camptocarpus semihastatus (Decne.) Klack.
- Camptocarpus sphenophyllus (Balf.f.) Venter
