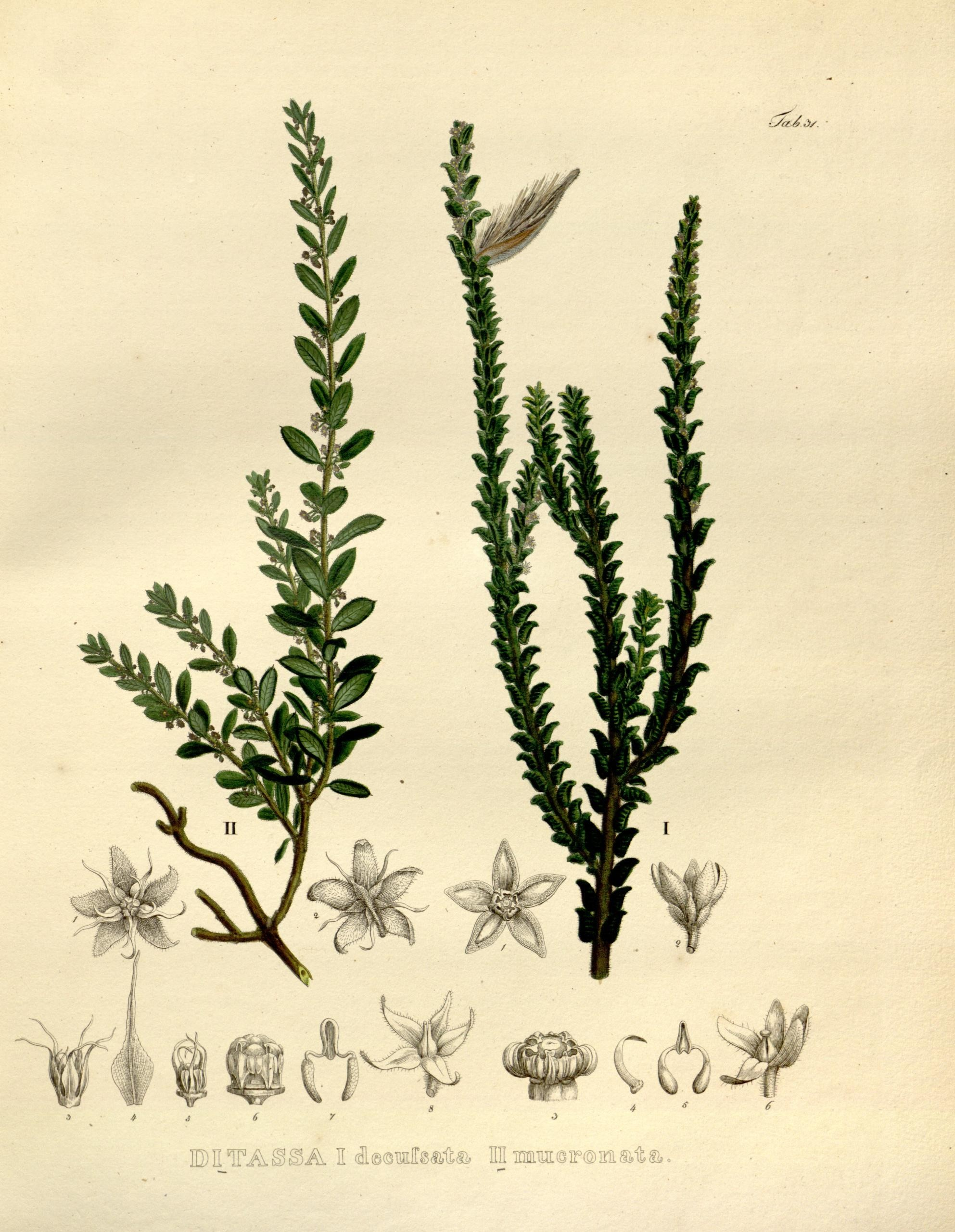
- Ditassa decussata (right) (syn of Minaria decussata); Ditassa mucronata (left)

Scientific classification
- Kingdom: Plantae
- Clade: Tracheophytes
- Clade: Angiosperms
- Clade: Eudicots
- Clade: Asterids
- Order: Gentianales
- Family: Apocynaceae
- Subfamily: Asclepiadoideae
- Tribe: Asclepiadeae
- Genus: Ditassa; R.Br.

= Ditassa =

Genus of flowering plants

Ditassa is a genus of plant in the family Apocynaceae, first described as a genus in 1810. It is native to South America.

Species

1. Ditassa acerifolia - S Venezuela
2. Ditassa aequicymosa - São Paulo
3. Ditassa albiflora - Peru
4. Ditassa albonerva - Lara in Venezuela
5. Ditassa anderssonii - Ecuador
6. Ditassa auriflora - Minas Gerais
7. Ditassa auyantepuiensis - Venezuela
8. Ditassa ayangannensis - Guyana
9. Ditassa banksii - Rio Janeiro
10. Ditassa bicolor - Minas Gerais
11. Ditassa blanchetii - Brazil
12. Ditassa bolivarensis - Bolívar in Venezuela
13. Ditassa buntingii - Amazonas in Venezuela
14. Ditassa capillaris - São Paulo, Bahia
15. Ditassa carnevalii - Amazonas in Venezuela
16. Ditassa caucana - Colombia
17. Ditassa ciliata - Amazonas in Venezuela
18. Ditassa cipoensis - Minas Gerais
19. Ditassa colellae - Bolivar in Venezuela
20. Ditassa conceptionis - Brazil
21. Ditassa congesta - Brazil
22. Ditassa cordeiroana - Minas Gerais
23. Ditassa crassa - Peru
24. Ditassa crassifolia - Brazil
25. Ditassa dardanoi - Brazil
26. Ditassa dolichoglossa - Bahia
27. Ditassa duartei - Espírito Santo
28. Ditassa duidae - Cerro Duida in Venezuela
29. Ditassa edmundoi - Serra de S. Luiz de Purunã in Paraná
30. Ditassa emmerichii - Brazil
31. Ditassa endoleuca - Colombia, Ecuador
32. Ditassa eximia - Brazil
33. Ditassa farneyi - Brazil
34. Ditassa fasciculata - Brazil
35. Ditassa fiebrigii - Bolivia
36. Ditassa foldatsii - Amazonas in Venezuela
37. Ditassa fontellae - Brazil
38. Ditassa franciscoi - Venezuela, Colombia
39. Ditassa fulva - Brazil
40. Ditassa gardneri - Brazil
41. Ditassa gillespieae - Guyana
42. Ditassa glaziovii - Brazil
43. Ditassa gracilipes - Peru
44. Ditassa gracilis - São Paulo
45. Ditassa hastata - Brazil
46. Ditassa hispida - Bahia
47. Ditassa imbricata - Rio de Janeiro
48. Ditassa insignis - Minas Gerais
49. Ditassa itambensis - Minas Gerais
50. Ditassa jahnii - Mérida in Venezuela
51. Ditassa juliani - Amazonas in Venezuela
52. Ditassa laevis - Brazil
53. Ditassa lanceolata - Peru, Brazil
54. Ditassa lenheirensis - Minas Gerais
55. Ditassa leonii - Minas Gerais
56. Ditassa liesneri - Amazonas in Venezuela
57. Ditassa lindemanii - Suriname
58. Ditassa linearis - Brazil
59. Ditassa lisae - Lara in Venezuela
60. Ditassa longicaulis - Brazil
61. Ditassa longiloba - Colombia
62. Ditassa longisepala - Brazil
63. Ditassa macarenae - Sierra de la Macarena in Colombia
64. Ditassa mandonii - Bolivia
65. Ditassa maranhensis - Maranhão
66. Ditassa maricaensis - Rio de Janeiro
67. Ditassa mattogrossensis - Mato Grosso
68. Ditassa megapotamica - Uruguay, S Brazil
69. Ditassa mucronata - Morro de Villa Rica in Minas Gerais
70. Ditassa multinervia - Amazonas in Venezuela
71. Ditassa myrtilloides - Serra Moeda in Minas Gerais
72. Ditassa nigrescens - Guyana
73. Ditassa niruri - Brazil
74. Ditassa nitida - Brazil
75. Ditassa obcordata - Minas Gerais
76. Ditassa oberdanii - Espírito Santo
77. Ditassa obovata - Bolivar in Venezuela
78. Ditassa obscura - Serra de Araxa in Paranaíba
79. Ditassa oliva-estevae - Amazonas in Venezuela
80. Ditassa ottohuberi - Amazonas in Venezuela
81. Ditassa oxyphylla - Venezuela, N Brazil
82. Ditassa paranensis - Paraná
83. Ditassa pauciflora - Guyana, N Brazil
84. Ditassa pedunculata - Minas Gerais
85. Ditassa perijensis - Magdalena in Colombia
86. Ditassa peruviana - Peru
87. Ditassa poeppigii - Brazil
88. Ditassa pohliana - Brazil
89. Ditassa racemosa - Chuquisaca in Bolivia
90. Ditassa ramosa - Brazil
91. Ditassa retusa - Brazil
92. Ditassa roraimensis - Guyana, SE Venezuela, N Brazil
93. Ditassa rotundifolia - Bahia
94. Ditassa salzmannii - Brazil
95. Ditassa schlechteri - Bolivia
96. Ditassa sillensis - N Venezuela
97. Ditassa silveirae - Serra do Cipó in Minas Gerais
98. Ditassa sipapoana - Amazonas in Venezuela
99. Ditassa sobradoi - Amazonas in Venezuela
100. Ditassa subalpina - Bolivia
101. Ditassa subulata - Margarita Island, Venezuelan West Indies
102. Ditassa subumbellata - Rio de Janeiro
103. Ditassa succedanea - Minas Gerais
104. Ditassa sucrensis - Venezuela
105. Ditassa surinamensis - Tafelberg in Suriname
106. Ditassa tamayoi - Zulia in Venezuela
107. Ditassa tassadioides - Sierra de Santa Cruz in Bolivia
108. Ditassa taxifolia - Guyana
109. Ditassa tomentosa - Rio de Janeiro
110. Ditassa umbellata - Rio de Janeiro
111. Ditassa velutina - Brazil
112. Ditassa venamensis - Bolivar in Venezuela
113. Ditassa verticillata - Amazonas in Venezuela
114. Ditassa violascens - Cuzco in Peru
115. Ditassa warmingii - Brazil
116. Ditassa weberbaueri - Chachapoyas Province in Peru
117. Ditassa xeroneura - Amazonas in Venezuela

formerly included

transferred to other genera (Blepharodon, Cynanchum, Metastelma, Minaria, Oxypetalum, Tassadia)

1. D. abortiva now Minaria abortiva
2. D. acerosa now Minaria acerosa
3. D. angustifolia now Cynanchum morilloi
4. D. anomala now Metastelma burchellii
5. D. aristata now Tassadia aristata
6. D. bifurcata now Minaria bifurcata
7. D. blepharodontoides now Blepharodon glaucescens
8. D. bonariensis now Cynanchum bonariense
9. D. burchellii now Metastelma burchellii
10. D. cordata now Minaria cordata
11. D. cordata var. abortiva now Minaria abortiva
12. D. decussata now Minaria decussata
13. D. diamantinensis now Minaria diamantinensis
14. D. ditassoides now Minaria ditassoides
15. D. ericoides now Minaria acerosa
16. D. glaucescens now Blepharodon glaucescens
17. D. grazielae now Minaria grazielae
18. D. hemipogonoides now Minaria hemipogonoides
19. D. humilis now Oxypetalum humile
20. D. inconspicua now Minaria inconspicua
21. D. lourteigiae now Minaria lourteigiae
22. D. magisteriana now Minaria magisteriana
23. D. manicata now Blepharodon manicatum
24. D. micromeria now Minaria micromeria
25. D. monocoronata now Minaria monocoronata
26. D. oblongifolia now Minaria abortiva
27. D. parva now Minaria parva
28. D. passerinoides Mart. not Decne. now Minaria decussata
29. D. passerinoides Decne. not Mart. now Minaria cordata
30. D. polygaloides now Minaria polygaloides
31. D. refractifolia now Minaria refractifolia
32. D. semirii now Minaria semirii
33. D. virgata now Minaria cordata
