= Nephradenia =

Scientific classification
- Kingdom: Plantae
- Clade: Embryophytes
- Clade: Tracheophytes
- Clade: Spermatophytes
- Clade: Angiosperms
- Clade: Eudicots
- Clade: Asterids
- Order: Gentianales
- Family: Apocynaceae
- Subfamily: Asclepiadoideae
- Tribe: Asclepiadeae
- Genus: Nephradenia; Decne.

Type species
- Nephradenia acerosa Decne.

Genus of neotropical flowering plants

Nephradenia is a genus of plants in the family Apocynaceae, first described as a genus in 1844. They are native to South America.

Species

1. Nephradenia acerosa Decne. - Goiás
2. Nephradenia asparagoides (Decne.) E.Fourn. - Bahia
3. Nephradenia filipes Malme - Serra da Chapada in Matto Grosso
4. Nephradenia linearis Benth. ex E.Fourn. - N Brazil, Ecuador, Venezuela

formerly included

transferred to other genera (Blepharodon, Marsdenia)

1. Nephradenia fruticosa synonym of Marsdenia fruticosa
2. Nephradenia linearis synonym of Blepharodon lineare
3. Nephradenia neriifolia synonym of Blepharodon gomphocarpoides
