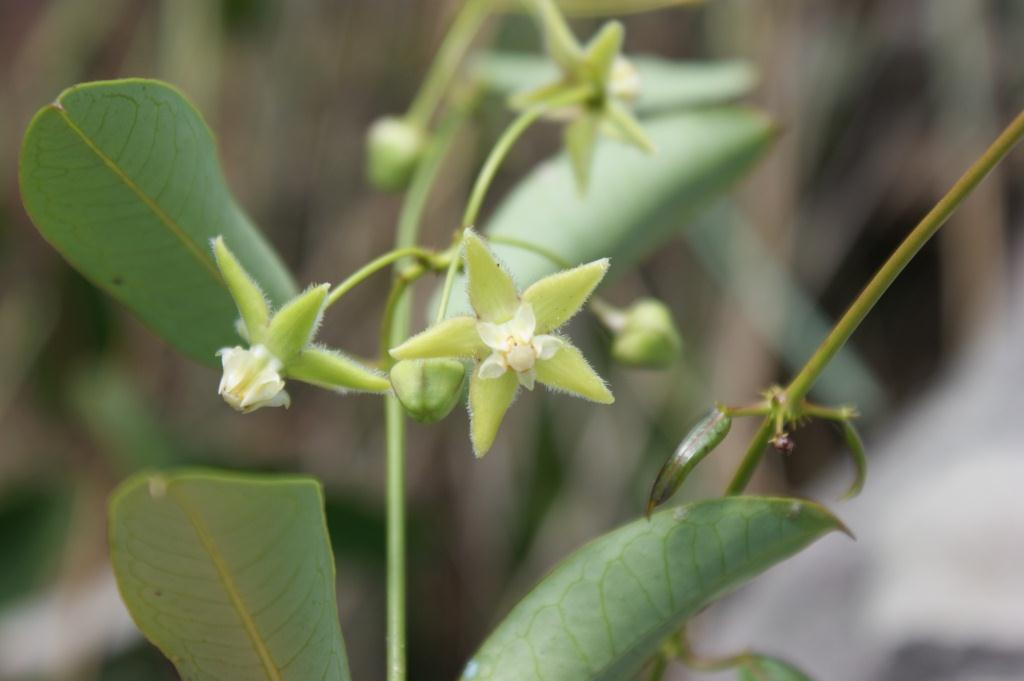
- Blepharodon pictum

Scientific classification
- Kingdom: Plantae
- Clade: Embryophytes
- Clade: Tracheophytes
- Clade: Spermatophytes
- Clade: Angiosperms
- Clade: Eudicots
- Clade: Asterids
- Order: Gentianales
- Family: Apocynaceae
- Subfamily: Asclepiadoideae
- Tribe: Asclepiadeae
- Genus: Blepharodon; Decne.

Type species
- Blepharodon lineare (Decne.) Decne.

Synonyms
- Anomotassa K.Schum.; Ptycholepis Griseb.

= Blepharodon =

Genus of neotropical flowering plants

Blepharodon is a genus of plant in the family Apocynaceae, first described as a genus in 1844. They are native primarily to South America, with one species extending into Central America and Mexico.

Species

1. Blepharodon amazonicum - NW Brazil
2. Blepharodon ampliflorum - NW Brazil
3. Blepharodon angustifolium - Paraguay
4. Blepharodon bicolor - Brazil
5. Blepharodon bicuspidatum - Brazil
6. Blepharodon colombianum - Colombia
7. Blepharodon costae - Bahia
8. Blepharodon crabronum - Serrania de Santiago de Chiquitos in Bolivia
9. Blepharodon cuatrecasasii - Sierra Nevada de Santa Marta in Colombia
10. Blepharodon glaucescens - Guyana
11. Blepharodon gomphocarpoides
12. Blepharodon grandiflorum - Colombia
13. Blepharodon harlingii - Ecuador
14. Blepharodon hatschbachii - Ponte de Pedra in Mato Grosso
15. Blepharodon hirsutum - Rio de Contas in Bahia
16. Blepharodon juliani - Bolívar State in SE Venezuela
17. Blepharodon lineare - Peru, Bolivia, Paraguay
18. Blepharodon maigualidae - Amazonas State in S Venezuela
19. Blepharodon manicatum - Piauí
20. Blepharodon mucronatum - from Tamaulipas + Nayarit south to Colombia + Venezuela
21. Blepharodon perijaense - Sierra de Perijá in Colombia
22. Blepharodon philibertioides - Cerro San Miserate in Bolivia
23. Blepharodon pictum - Bolivia, Brazil, Venezuela, Suriname, Fr Guiana
24. Blepharodon polydori - Colombia
25. Blepharodon reflexum - Paraguay, Brazil
26. Blepharodon salicinum - Brazil, Bolivia, Colombia
27. Blepharodon suberectum - Cauca region in Colombia
28. Blepharodon tillettii - Guyana
29. Blepharodon ulei - Guyana, S Venezuela, N Brazil

formerly included

transferred to other genera (Ditassa, Minaria, Nephradenia)

1. B. asparagoides now Nephradenia asparagoides
2. B. ciliatum now Ditassa ciliata
3. B. polygaloides now Minaria polygaloides
4. B. viscidum now Nephradenia linearis
5. Blepharodon bolivianum now Vailia mucronata
6. Blepharodon peruvianum now Vailia mucronata
