= Trichosandra =

Scientific classification
- Kingdom: Plantae
- Clade: Tracheophytes
- Clade: Angiosperms
- Clade: Eudicots
- Clade: Asterids
- Order: Gentianales
- Family: Apocynaceae
- Genus: Trichosandra; Decne.

Genus of flowering plants

Trichosandra is a genus of flowering plants belonging to the family Apocynaceae.

Its native range is Mascarenes.

Species:

- Trichosandra borbonica Decne.
