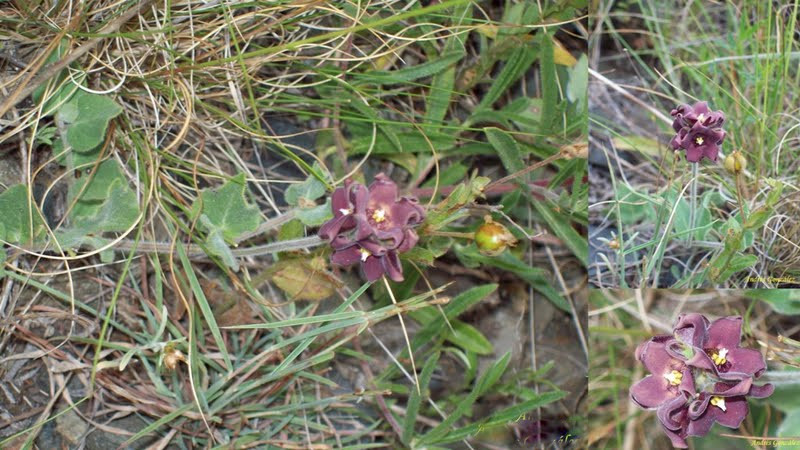

Scientific classification
- Kingdom: Plantae
- Clade: Tracheophytes
- Clade: Angiosperms
- Clade: Eudicots
- Clade: Asterids
- Order: Gentianales
- Family: Apocynaceae
- Subfamily: Asclepiadoideae
- Tribe: Asclepiadeae
- Genus: Rhyssostelma; Decne.
- Species: R. nigricans

Binomial name
- Rhyssostelma nigricans Decne.

= Rhyssostelma =

Genus of flowering plants

Rhyssostelma is a species of plants in the family Apocynaceae first described as a genus in 1844. It contains only one known species, Rhyssostelma nigricans, endemic to Argentina.
