= Anna Murray Vail =

American botanist

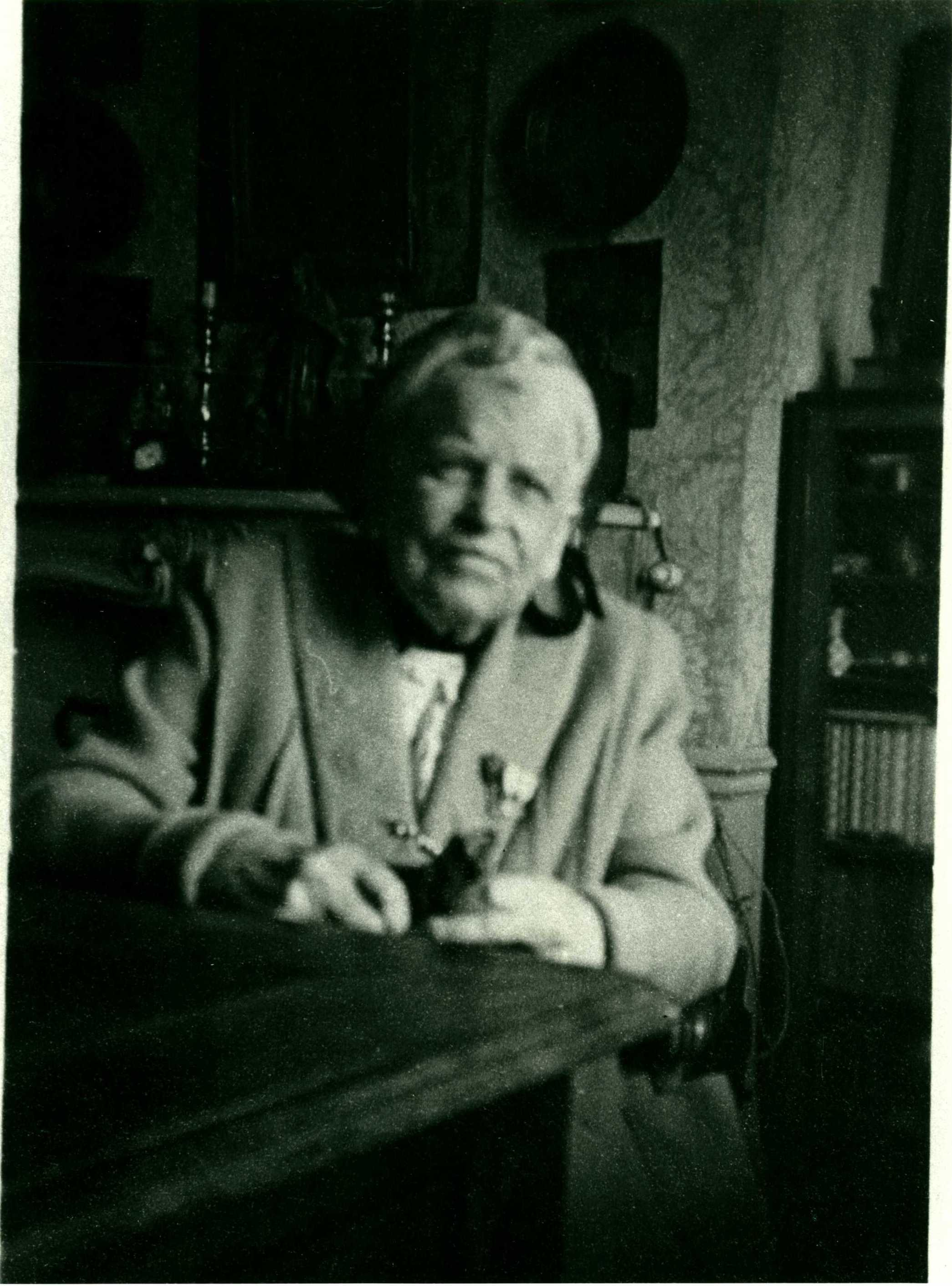
- Born: January 7, 1863; New York City
- Died: December 18, 1955 (aged 92); Vieux Logis
- Resting place: Héricy
- Scientific career
- Fields: Botany; Library science
- Workplaces: New York Botanical Garden

Anna Murray Vail (January 7, 1863 – December 18, 1955) was an American botanist and the first librarian of the New York Botanical Garden. She was a student and collaborator of botanist and geologist Nathaniel Lord Britton, with whom she helped to found the New York Botanical Garden.

== Early life ==
Anna was born on New York's east side, the first child of David Olyphant Vail and Cornelia Georgina (Nina) Van Rensselear. On her mother's side, she is descended from two of New York's elite Dutch families, the Van Rensselears and Van Cortlandts. Her great-great-grandfather was General Robert Van Rensselaer, who fought at Fort Ticonderoga during the American Revolution under the orders of his mother's brother-in-law, General Philip Schuyler. Her younger sister, Cornelia, married the painter Henry Golden Dearth.

Vail's father, David Olyphant Vail, was the son of Benjamin C. and Eliza Ann (née Archer) Vail. David O. Vail's connection to the Olyphant family is through his maternal grandmother, Ann Mckenzie (1782 – November 5, 1857). Her first husband was Zeno Archer, whom she married in 1803. Their daughter was Eliza Ann who married Benjamin Vail. Following Zeno's death, Ann McKenzie Archer married David W.C. Olyphant.

David O. Vail is listed as a "merchant" on an 1862 ship manifest and in a Van Rensselaer family history is described as "...resident partner of the house of Olyphant & Company at Shanghai, China." His death notice describes him as being "...lately of China...", but it is not clear where or of what he died in 1865 at age 32. His middle name, Olyphant, and the fact that he worked for Olyphant & Company reflect his connection to that family on his mother's side. Olyphant and Company, founded in 1827 by David WC Olyphant and Charles N. Talbot, was one of the pioneers of the Old China Trade.

== Professional activities ==
Vail's early education was in Europe, but by 1895 she had returned to the United States, where she worked at Columbia University with Nathaniel Lord Britton, who co-founded the New York Botanical Garden with his wife Elizabeth Gertrude Britton. In January 1900, Vail became the first librarian of the New York Botanical Garden library, a post she held until September 1907. While in New York, she authored over a dozen scientific papers. Her notes, preserved in the Archives and Manuscripts collection of the New York Botanical Garden, include sketches of some of the plants she studied.

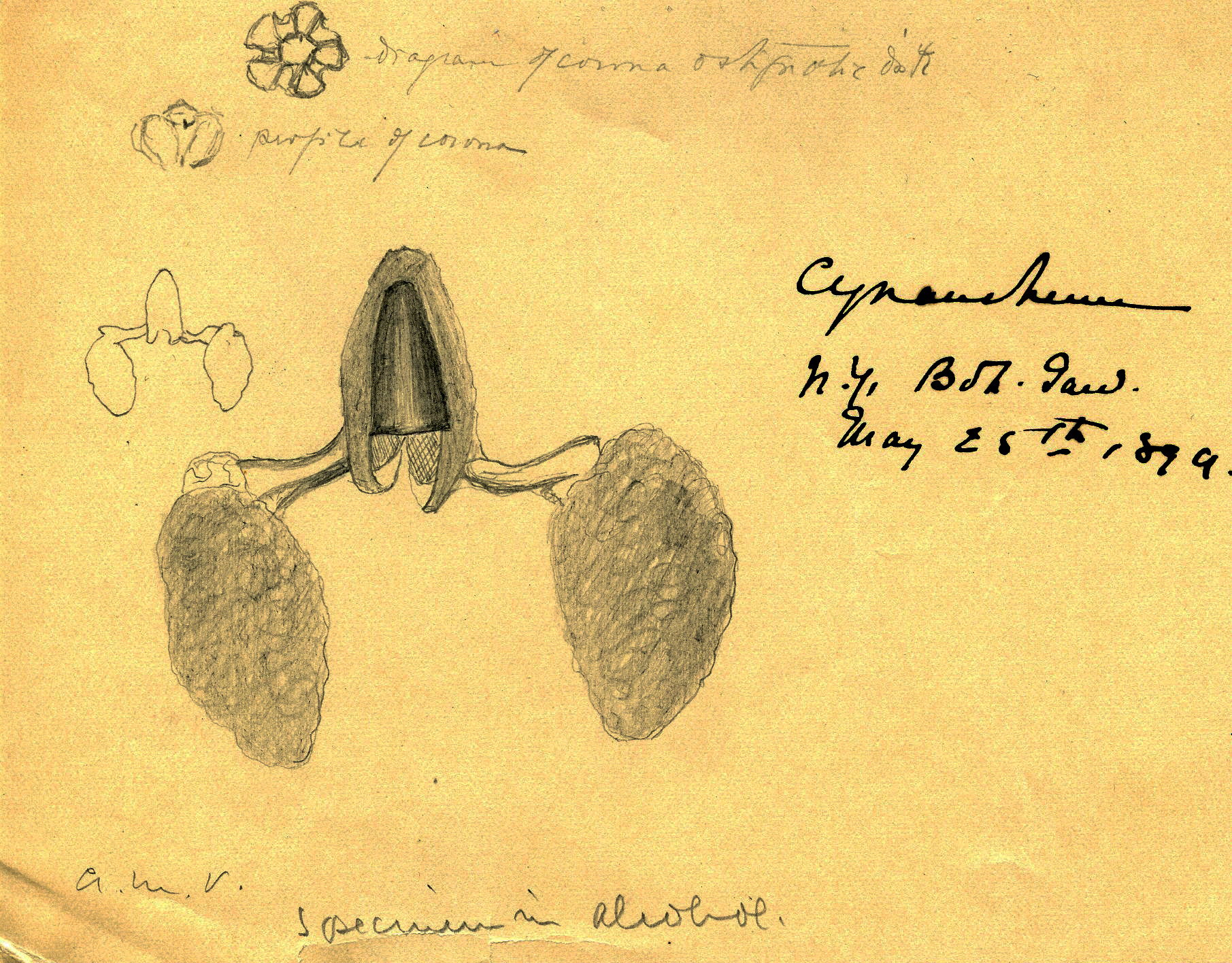
Pen & ink sketch of Cynanchum sp by Anna Murray Vail. This was created by Ms. Vail in 1899 when she was librarian at the New York Botanical Garden.

In 1898, botanist Henry Hurd Rusby published Vailia, which is a monotypic genus of flowering plants belonging to the family Apocynaceae and named in Anna Murray Vail's honor.

In 1903, Vail traveled to Paris, France, for an auction of the botanical literature of the late Professor Claude Thomas Alexis Jordan. She obtained over 400 items, including ten volumes of John Sibthorp's Flora graeca.

Vail wrote on numerous botanical topics; for example, her 1898 co-authored work (with Elizabeth Gertrude Britton, among others), details "New or Rare Mosses," such as Anacamptodon Splachnoides.

An account in the records of the New York Botanical Garden presents Vail's resignation from the Garden's Library as resulting from her indignation of being accused of smoking cigarettes in the library. However, this account is disputed by a letter in the files of Nathaniel Lord Britton dated September 28, 1907, which mentions her departure as being due to an extended separation from her mother, who was living in France.

In 1911, Vail moved to France. During World War I, she became active in the American Fund for French Wounded, eventually becoming its treasurer. A letter to the head of the organization, Mrs. Schuyler Van Rensselaer, was published in The New York Times. An excerpt from the letter reads:

Every department of the Red Cross has borrowed nurses and aids, and we of the American Fund have given everything we had for the emergency. If it gets worse, I shall offer my own services, for I can make beds and clean up, and no part of the work will terrify me, even if I am not a trained nurse.

== Later life and death ==
While living in France, Vail acquired a house in Héricy, where she lived for the rest of her life continuing her work as a librarian until blindness forced her to retire. She died in Vieux Logis on December 18, 1955, and is buried in the municipal cemetery at Héricy.

== Bibliography ==
- Vail, Anna Murray. A Study of the Genus Galactia in North America. Bull. of the Torrey Botanical Club. 22:500 – 511, 1895.
- MacDougal, Daniel T, Vail, Anna M., Shull, George H. and Small, John K. Mutants and hybrids of the oenotheras. Carnegie Institution of Washington, Publication No. 24. Papers of Station for Experimental Evolution at Cold Spring Harbor, New York. No. 2., 1905.
- Vail, Anna Murray. Onagra grandiflora (Ait.), a species to be included in the North American Flora. Torreya 5:9–10, 1905.
- MacDougal, Daniel T, Vail, Anna M and Shull, George H. Mutations, variations and relationships of the oenotheras. Carnegie Institution of Washington Publication No. 81. Papers of the Station for Experimental Evolution, No. 9. Carnegie Institution of Washington, Washington, DC 1907.
- Vail, Anna Murray. "An Undescribed Species of Kallstroemia from New Mexico." Bulletin of the Torrey Botanical Club. No. 24, no. 4, pp. 206–207, 1897.
- Britton, NL and Vail, Anna Murray. An enumeration of the plants collected by M.E. Penard in Colorado during the summer of 1892. Contributions from the Herbarium of Columbia College; no. 75, New York: Columbia College, 1895.
- Vail, Anna Murray. Jane Colden, an early New York botanist. Torreya 7:21–34. 28 F 1907.
- Vail, Anna Murray. The June flora of a Long Island swamp. Bulletin of the Torrey Botanical Club, 22, p. 374–378.
- Vail, Anna Murray. Studies in the Leguminosae. I, II, III. Reprinted from Bulletin of the Torrey Botanical Club, 23: 139–141, 30 Ap. 1896; 24: 14–18, January 28, 1897; 26: 106–117, March 18, 1899. New York: [Columbia University], 1899.
- Vail, Anna Murray. Contributions to the botany of Virginia. Memoirs of the Torrey Botanical Club v. 2, no. 2, 1890.
- Vail, Anna Murray. A preliminary list of the species of the genus Meibomia, Heist., occurring in the United States and British America. Bulletin of the Torrey Botanical Club, vol. XIX, no. 4, April, 1892.
- Vail, Anna Murray. A revision of the North American species of the genus Cracca. Bulletin of the Torrey Botanical Club, vol. XXII, no. 1, Jan. 1895
- Vail, Anna Murray. A study of the genus Psoralea in America. Bulletin of the Torrey Botanical Club, v. 21, no. 3, March 24, 1894
- Vail, Anna Murray. Report on a Trip to France and Holland by Miss A.M. Vail, Librarian. Journal of the New York Botanical Garden, v. 4, No. 45, September 1903
- Vail, A. (1897). Studies in the Asclepiadaceae.-I. Bulletin of the Torrey Botanical Club, 24(6), 305–310.
- Vail, Anna Murray. "Studies in the Asclepiadaceae.-II." Bulletin of the Torrey Botanical Club, vol. 25, no. 1, 1898, pp. 30–39.
- Vail, Anna Murray. "Studies in the Asclepiadaceae-VI. Notes on the Genus Rouliniella." Bulletin of the Torrey Botanical Club, vol. 29, no. 12, 1902, pp. 662–668.
- Vail, Anna Murray. "Studies in the Asclepiadaceae-VII. A New Species of Vincetoxicum from Alabama." Bulletin of the Torrey Botanical Club, vol. 30, no. 3, 1903, pp. 178–179.
- Vail, Anna Murray. "Studies in the Asclepiadaceae-VIII. A New Species of Asclepias from Kansas and Two Possible Hybrids from New York." Bulletin of the Torrey Botanical Club, vol. 31, no. 9, 1904, pp. 457–460.
- Vail, Anna Murray. "A Preliminary List of the North American Species of Malpighiaceae and Zygophyllaceae." Bulletin of the Torrey Botanical Club, vol. 22, no. 5, 1895, pp. 228–231.
- Britton, Elizabeth G., Anna Murray Vail, D. A. Burnett, E. Classon, George G. Kennedy, and George N. Best. "New or Rare Mosses." The Bryologist 1, no. 2 (1898): 41–43.
- Vail, Anna Murray et al. "NOTES ON THE SPRING FLORA OF SOUTHWESTERN VIRGINIA." Memoirs of the Torrey Botanical Club, vol. 2, no. 2, 1890, pp. 27–56.
- Small, John K., and Anna Murray Vail. "Report of the Botanical Exploration of Southwestern Virginia During the Season of 1892." Memoirs of the Torrey Botanical Club, vol. 4, no. 2, 1893, pp. 93–201.
- Vail, Anna Murray. "Notes on Covillea and Fagonia." Bulletin of the Torrey Botanical Club, vol. 26, no. 6, 1899, pp. 301–302.

== See also ==
- Timeline of women in science
