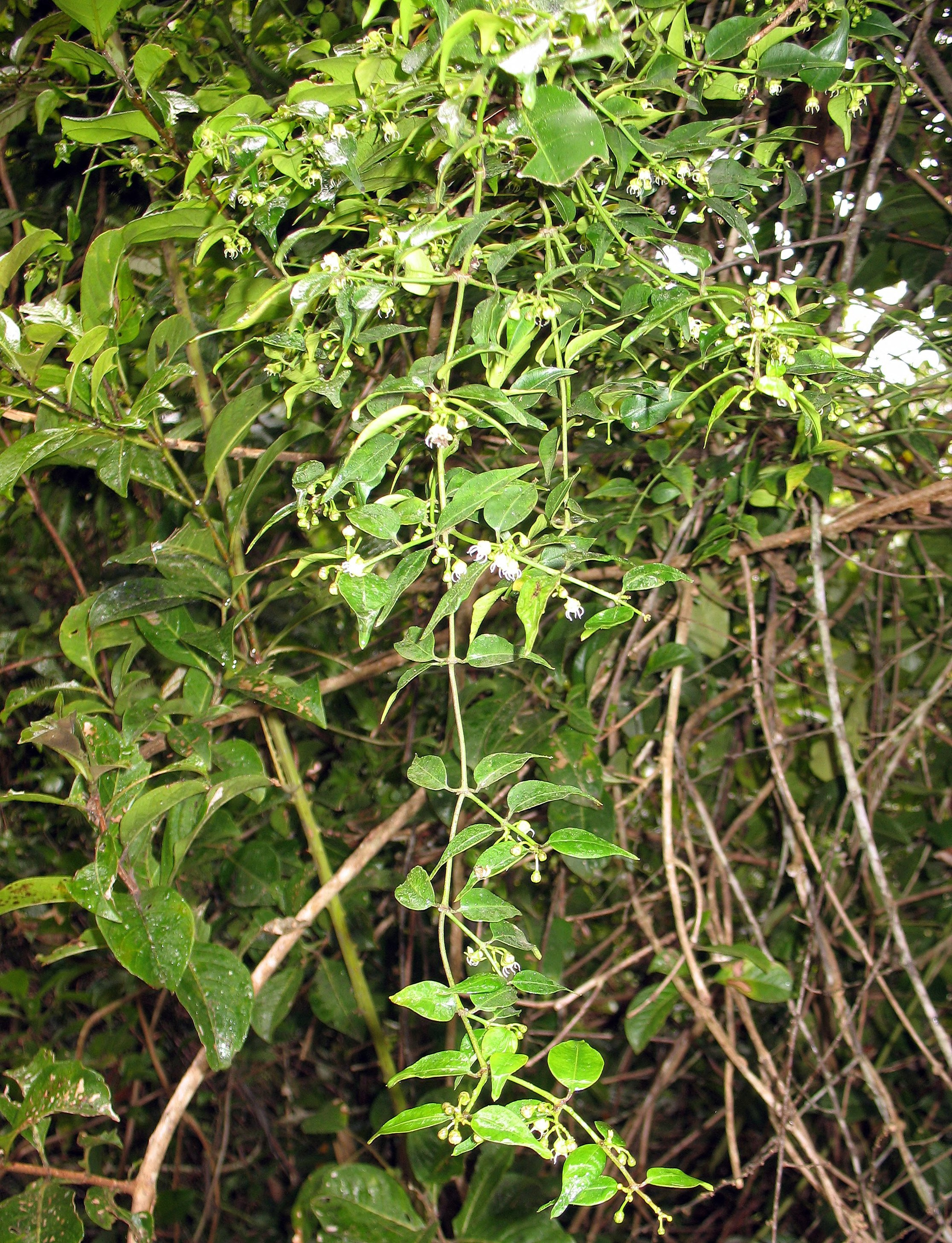
- Photograph of Camptocarpus acuminatus

Conservation status
- Vulnerable (IUCN 3.1)

Scientific classification
- Kingdom: Plantae
- Clade: Tracheophytes
- Clade: Angiosperms
- Clade: Eudicots
- Clade: Asterids
- Order: Gentianales
- Family: Apocynaceae
- Genus: Camptocarpus
- Species: C. acuminatus

Binomial name
- Camptocarpus acuminatus (Choux) Venter

Synonyms
- Tanulepis acuminata Choux

= Camptocarpus acuminatus =

Species of flowering plant

Camptocarpus acuminatus is a species of plant in the Apocynaceae family. It is endemic to the Madagascar. Pierre Choux, the botanist who first formally described the species, named it after the tapering (acuminatus in Latin) tips of its leaves, using the synonymous name Tanulepis acuminata.

== Description ==
It is a woody climbing plant. The oval to disc-shaped leaves are 27–41 by 13–19 millimeters. Its leaves taper to a distinctive tip. Its petioles are 3–5 millimeters long. It has small flowers that are 2.4–2.5 millimeters long. Its 5 petals are fused at the base forming a tube. The flowers have a structure between the petals and the stamen called a corona. The base of the corona forms a ring that is fused with the base of the petals and the stamen. Its corona has 5 thread-like lobes that are radially aligned with the stamen. Its flowers have 5 stamen.

=== Reproductive biology ===
The pollen of Camptocarpus acuminatus is shed as permanent tetrads.

=== Distribution and habitat ===
It has been observed growing in humid forests at elevations of 600 to 1200 meters.
