= Lepinia =

Scientific classification
- Kingdom: Plantae
- Clade: Tracheophytes
- Clade: Angiosperms
- Clade: Eudicots
- Clade: Asterids
- Order: Gentianales
- Family: Apocynaceae
- Subfamily: Rauvolfioideae
- Tribe: Alyxieae
- Subtribe: Alyxiinae
- Genus: Lepinia; Decne.

Genus of plants

Lepinia is a genus of plant in the family Apocynaceae first described as a genus in 1849. It is native to various islands in the Pacific Ocean.

Species

1. Lepinia marquisensis Lorence & W.L.Wagner - Fatu Hiva in the Marquesas
2. Lepinia ponapensis Hosok. - Pohnpei in the Caroline Islands
3. Lepinia solomonensis Hemsl. - New Guinea, Solomon Islands
4. Lepinia taitensis Decne. - Moorea + Tahiti in the Society Islands
