= Nautonia =

Scientific classification
- Kingdom: Plantae
- Clade: Embryophytes
- Clade: Tracheophytes
- Clade: Spermatophytes
- Clade: Angiosperms
- Clade: Eudicots
- Clade: Asterids
- Order: Gentianales
- Family: Apocynaceae
- Subfamily: Asclepiadoideae
- Tribe: Asclepiadeae
- Genus: Nautonia; Decne.
- Species: N. nummularia

Binomial name
- Nautonia nummularia Decne.

Genus of flowering plants from Brazil

Nautonia is a group of plants in the family Apocynaceae first described as a genus in 1844. It contains only one known species, Nautonia nummularia, native to Brazil.
