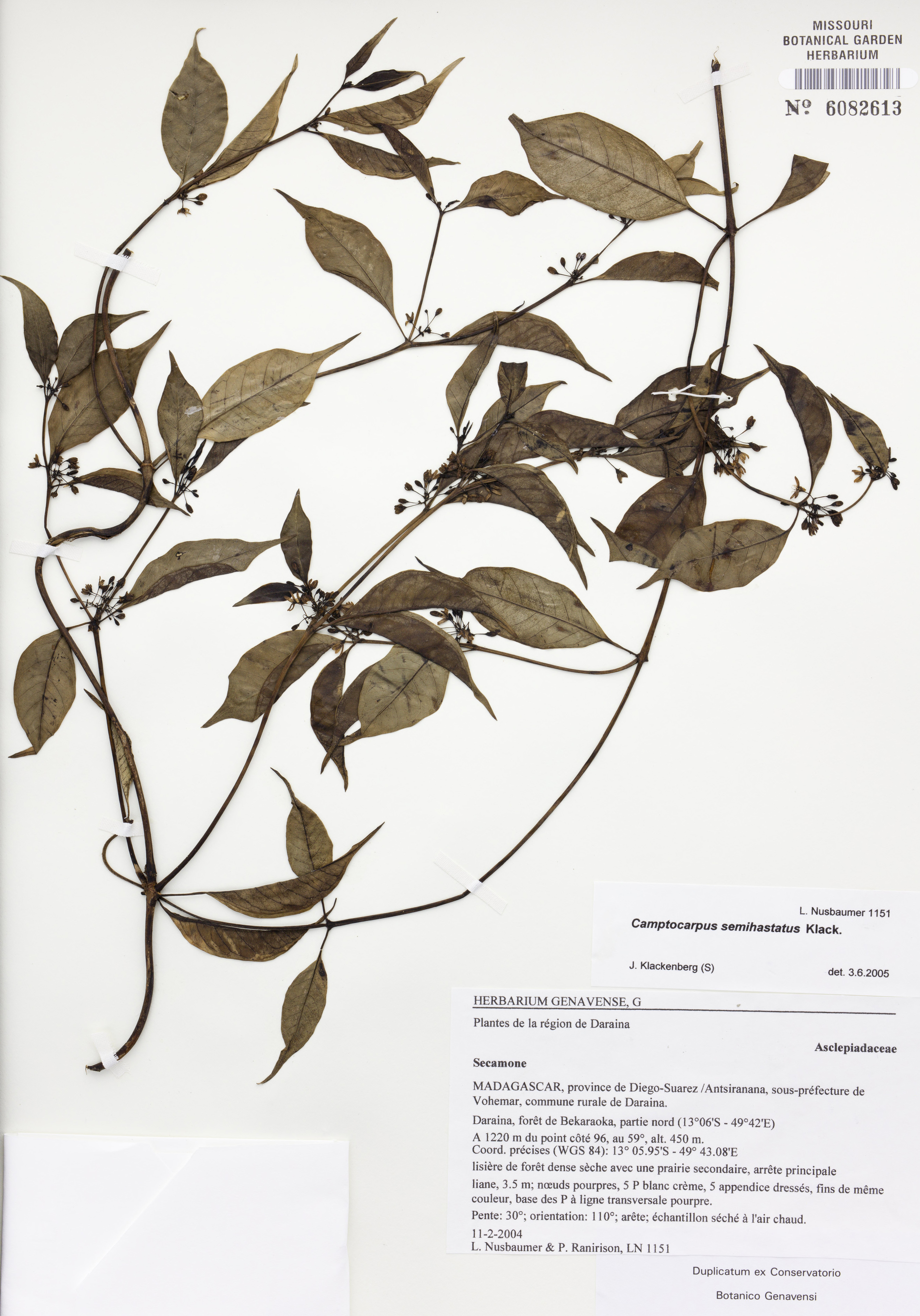
- Photograph of a herbarium specimen of Camptocarpus semihastatus

Conservation status
- Least Concern (IUCN 3.1)

Scientific classification
- Kingdom: Plantae
- Clade: Tracheophytes
- Clade: Angiosperms
- Clade: Eudicots
- Clade: Asterids
- Order: Gentianales
- Family: Apocynaceae
- Genus: Camptocarpus
- Species: C. semihastatus

Binomial name
- Camptocarpus semihastatus Klack.

Synonyms
- Harpanema acuminatum Decne.

= Camptocarpus semihastatus =

Species of flowering plant

Camptocarpus semihastatus is a species of plant in the Apocynaceae family. It is native to Madagascar. Jens Klackenberg, the botanist who formally described the species named it after the distinct coronal lobes of its flowers that resemble half the head of a spear (hasta in Latin).

== Description ==
It is a climbing plant. Its elliptical to egg-shaped leaves are 3.5–7 by 1–3 millimeters. The tips of its leaves sometimes come to a long, tapering point. The bases of the leaves are wedge-shaped to tapering. Its petioles are 3–13 millimeters long. Its many flowered, branching Inflorescences occur at the junction between the leaves and stem. Each flower is on a pedicels that is 3–6 millimeters long. The pedicels have bracts that are 1 millimeter long. Its flowers have 5 hairless sepals that are connected at the base with broad, egg-shaped lobes that are 0.7–1 by 0.7–1 millimeters. The sepals have pointed tips. The 5 hairless, white to rose-colored petals are fused at their base to form a 0.8–1.2 millimeter tube with oblong lobes that are 2.8–3.4 by 1.1–1.6 millimeters. The petals have rounded tips. The flowers have a ring-like structure between the petals and its stamen called a corona. Its corona has 5 thread-like lobes that are 2–3 millimeters long with appendages at the top that point inwards. Its stamen have very short, 0.1 millimeter-long, filaments and 0.5–0.6 millimeter long anthers. The anthers have a recurved appendix at their base. The connective tissue between the chambers of the anther extends up into a rounded tip. Its pistils have broad, cone-shaped stigma.

=== Reproductive biology ===
The pollen of Camptocarpus linearis is shed as permanent tetrads.

=== Distribution and habitat ===
It has been observed growing in forest and shrub habitats at elevations of 500 to 1499 meters.
