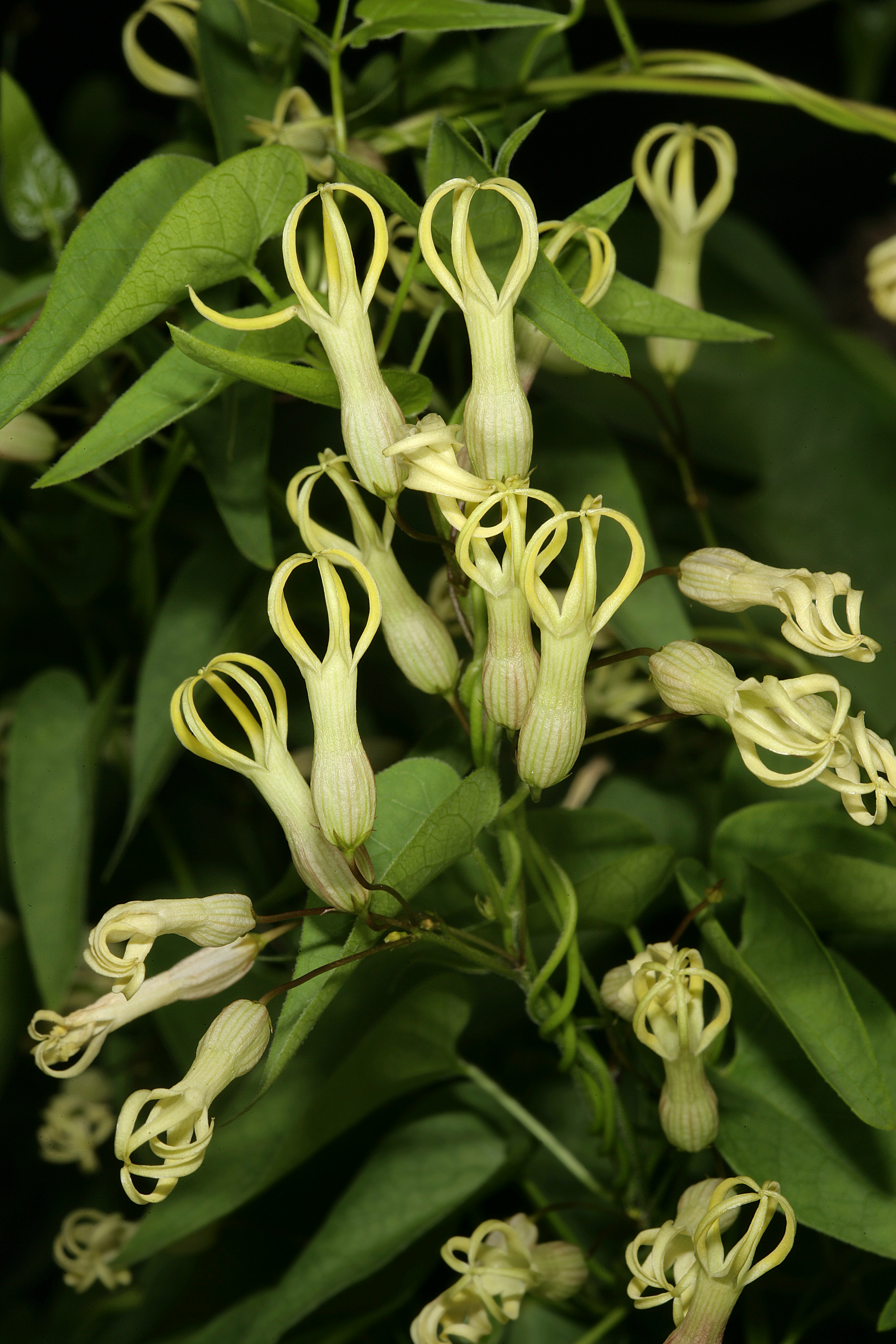
- Riocreuxia polyantha

Scientific classification
- Kingdom: Plantae
- Clade: Tracheophytes
- Clade: Angiosperms
- Clade: Eudicots
- Clade: Asterids
- Order: Gentianales
- Family: Apocynaceae
- Subfamily: Asclepiadoideae
- Tribe: Ceropegieae
- Genus: Riocreuxia; Decne. 1844

Type species
- Riocreuxia torulosa

= Riocreuxia =

Genus of plants

Riocreuxia is a plant genus in the family Apocynaceae, and named in honour of the botanical illustrator Alfred Riocreux (1820-1912). It was first described as a genus in 1844 and is native to Africa.

== Species ==
Species from the Plant List

Image	Name	Distribution
	Riocreuxia aberrans R.A.Dyer	Limpopo, Mpumalanga
	Riocreuxia alexandrina (Huber) R.A.Dyer	South Africa
	Riocreuxia bolusii N.E.Br.	South Africa
	Riocreuxia burchellii K.Schum.	South Africa
	Riocreuxia chrysochroma (H.Huber) Radcl.-Sm.	Tanzania
	Riocreuxia flanaganii Schltr.	South Africa
	Riocreuxia picta Schltr.	South Africa
	Riocreuxia polyantha Schltr.	South Africa
	Riocreuxia splendida K.Schum.	Tanzania
	Riocreuxia torulosa Decne.	South Africa
	Riocreuxia woodii N.E.Br.	South Africa
