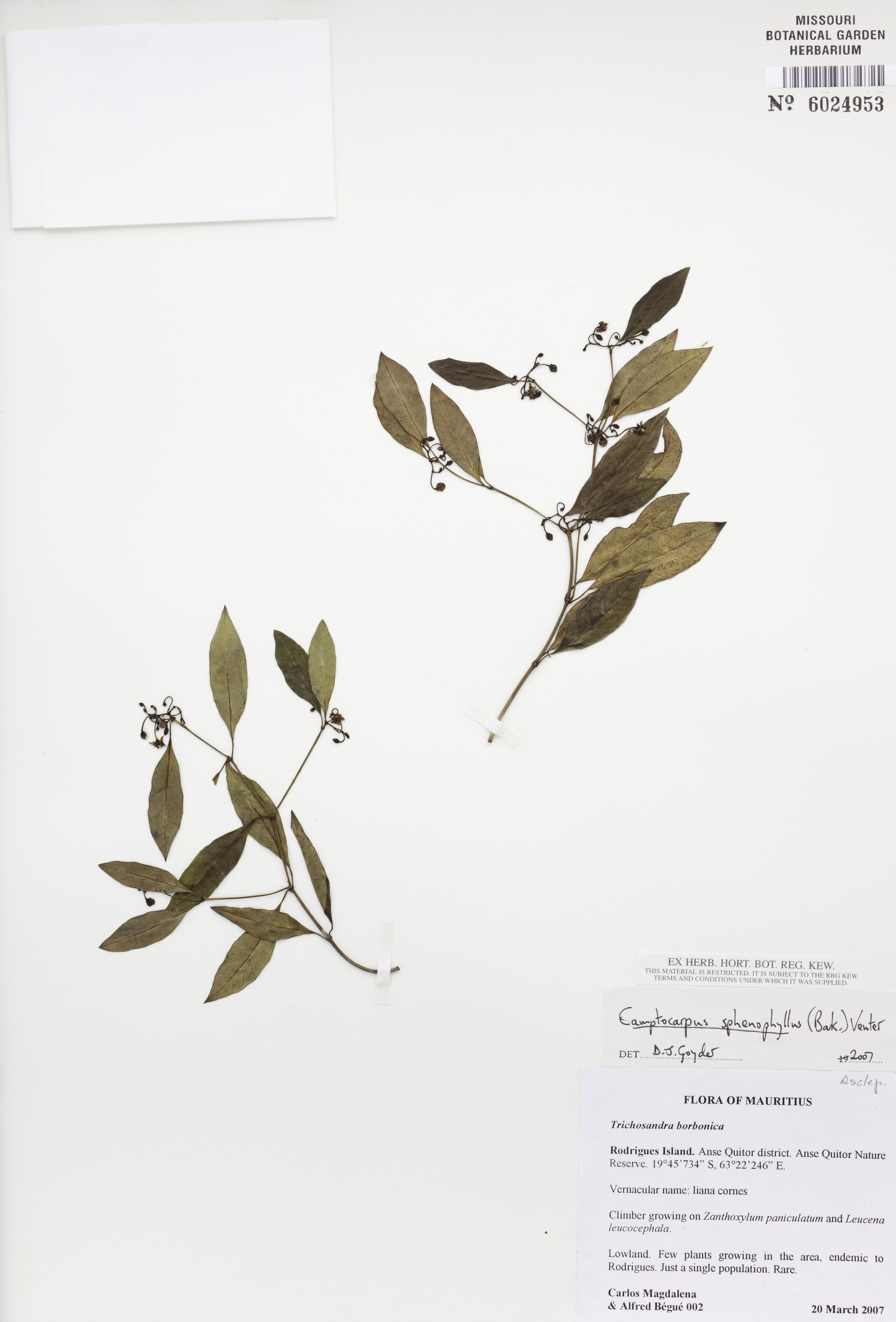
- Photograph of a herbarium specimen of Camptocarpus sphenophyllus

Scientific classification
- Kingdom: Plantae
- Clade: Tracheophytes
- Clade: Angiosperms
- Clade: Eudicots
- Clade: Asterids
- Order: Gentianales
- Family: Apocynaceae
- Genus: Camptocarpus
- Species: C. sphenophyllus

Binomial name
- Camptocarpus sphenophyllus (Balf.f.) Venter

Synonyms
- Tanulepis sphenophylla Balf.f.

= Camptocarpus sphenophyllus =

Species of flowering plant

Camptocarpus sphenophyllus is a species of plant in the Apocynaceae family. It is endemic to the island of Rodrigues. Isaac Bayley Balfour, the naturalist who first formally described the species named it, using the synonym Tanulepis sphenophylla, after its wedge-shaped leaves (Latinized forms of Greek σφην-, sphen- and φύλλον, phúllon).

== Description ==
It is a climbing plant. Its slender branches are cylindrical. Its hairless, membranous, oblong to lance-shaped leaves are 5.1–7.6 by 0.8–1.2 centimeters. The tips of its leaves come point and the bases are wedge-shaped. Its petioles are 6–9 millimeters long. Its inflorescences occur at the junction between the leaves and stem and have sparse flowers. The inflorescences have negligible peduncles, and wavy pedicels, that 1.3–1.9 centimeters long. Its flowers have 5 small sepals that are 1 millimeter long, fused at their base, with triangular lobes. Its 5 hairless, greenish petals are fused at the base, 3.1 millimeters long, with lance-shaped lobes. The flowers have a ring-like structure between the petals and its stamen called a corona. The foot of the corona is fused to the base of the stamen. Its corona has 5 tongue-shaped lobes that are 1 millimeter long with blunt tips. Its anthers and stigma are fused to form a structure called a gynostegium that is 1 by 1 millimeters Its smooth, cylindrical fruit are up to 7.6 centimeters long with pointed tips.

=== Reproductive biology ===
The pollen of Camptocarpus linearis is shed as permanent tetrads.

=== Distribution and habitat ===
It has been observed growing in valleys and on hills.
