= Massaria =

Scientific classification
- Kingdom: Fungi
- Division: Ascomycota
- Class: Dothideomycetes
- Order: Pleosporales
- Family: Massariaceae
- Genus: Massaria; De Not.

Type species
- Massaria inquinans (Tode) De Not.

Synonyms
- Aglaospora De Not.; Bathystomum Füisting; Phaeomassaria Spegazzini, 1880

Genus of fungi

Massaria is a genus of fungi in the family Massariaceae.

The genus name of Massaria is in honour of Giuseppe Filippo Massara (1792–1839), who was an Italian doctor and botanist, working in Sondrio.

The genus was circumscribed by Giuseppe De Notaris in Giorn. Bot. Ital. vol.1 (Issue 1) on page 333 in 1844.

== Known species ==
As accepted by GBIF;

- Massaria abdita Kirschst.
- Massaria aceris (Schulzer) Sacc. & Traverso
- Massaria aesculi Tul. & C.Tul.
- Massaria alangii A.Pande
- Massaria alni G.H.Otth ex Jacz.
- Massaria anomia (Fr.) Petr.
- Massaria antoniae Fabre
- Massaria argentinensis Speg.
- Massaria ariae Voglmayr & Jaklitsch
- Massaria aucupariae Voglmayr & Jaklitsch
- Massaria bambusina Teng
- Massaria batumensis Siemaszko
- Massaria berberidis Oudem.
- Massaria bihyalina Höhn.
- Massaria bolivarii Gonz.Frag.
- Massaria calligoni Frolov
- Massaria campestris Voglmayr & Jaklitsch
- Massaria canariensis Petr.
- Massaria carpinicola Tul. & C.Tul.
- Massaria conspurcata (Wallr.) Sacc.
- Massaria corticola (Fuckel) L.Holm
- Massaria crypta (Fr.) Fr.
- Massaria destreae Oudem.
- Massaria eryngiana Delacr.
- Massaria eucalypti Tassi
- Massaria fagicola Allesch.
- Massaria ferulicola Koshk.
- Massaria fimeti Pers.
- Massaria gigantispora Voglmayr & Jaklitsch
- Massaria ginkgoi Lar.N.Vassiljeva & Melnik
- Massaria himalayensis S.K.Bose
- Massaria immersa C.Moreau & M.Moreau
- Massaria inquinans (Tode) De Not.
- Massaria japonica I.Miyake
- Massaria kamatii Tilak & S.B.Kale
- Massaria lantanae G.H.Otth ex Shoemaker & P.M.LeClair
- Massaria lini Hollós
- Massaria macra (Vestergr.) Voglmayr & Jaklitsch
- Massaria macrospora F.L.Tai & C.T.Wei
- Massaria malbrancheana (Sacc.) De Not.
- Massaria mediterranea Voglmayr & Jaklitsch
- Massaria mirabilis Lar.N.Vassiljeva
- Massaria moenana Ade
- Massaria moricola I.Miyake
- Massaria navicellae Lar.N.Vassiljeva
- Massaria parva Voglmayr & Jaklitsch
- Massaria petrakii Tilak, S.B.Kale & S.V.S.Kale
- Massaria phillyreae Petr.
- Massaria platani Ces., 1861
- Massaria platanioides Rehm
- Massaria platanoidea Voglmayr & Jaklitsch
- Massaria pomacearum Höhn.
- Massaria pruni Wehm.
- Massaria pupula (Fr.) Sacc.
- Massaria rhyponta (Mont.) Sacc.
- Massaria salilliformis Wehm.
- Massaria scoparia Rehm
- Massaria shearii Petr.
- Massaria sorbi Hazsl.
- Massaria sphaerelloidea Alcalde
- Massaria texana Rehm
- Massaria theicola Petch
- Massaria tilakii Mhaskar & V.G.Rao
- Massaria ulmi Fuckel
- Massaria vindobonensis Voglmayr & Jaklitsch
- Massaria vomitoria Berk. & M.A.Curtis
- Massaria xanthoxyli (Peck) Petr.
- Massaria zanthoxyli (Peck) Petr.
- Massaria zelkovae Teng
