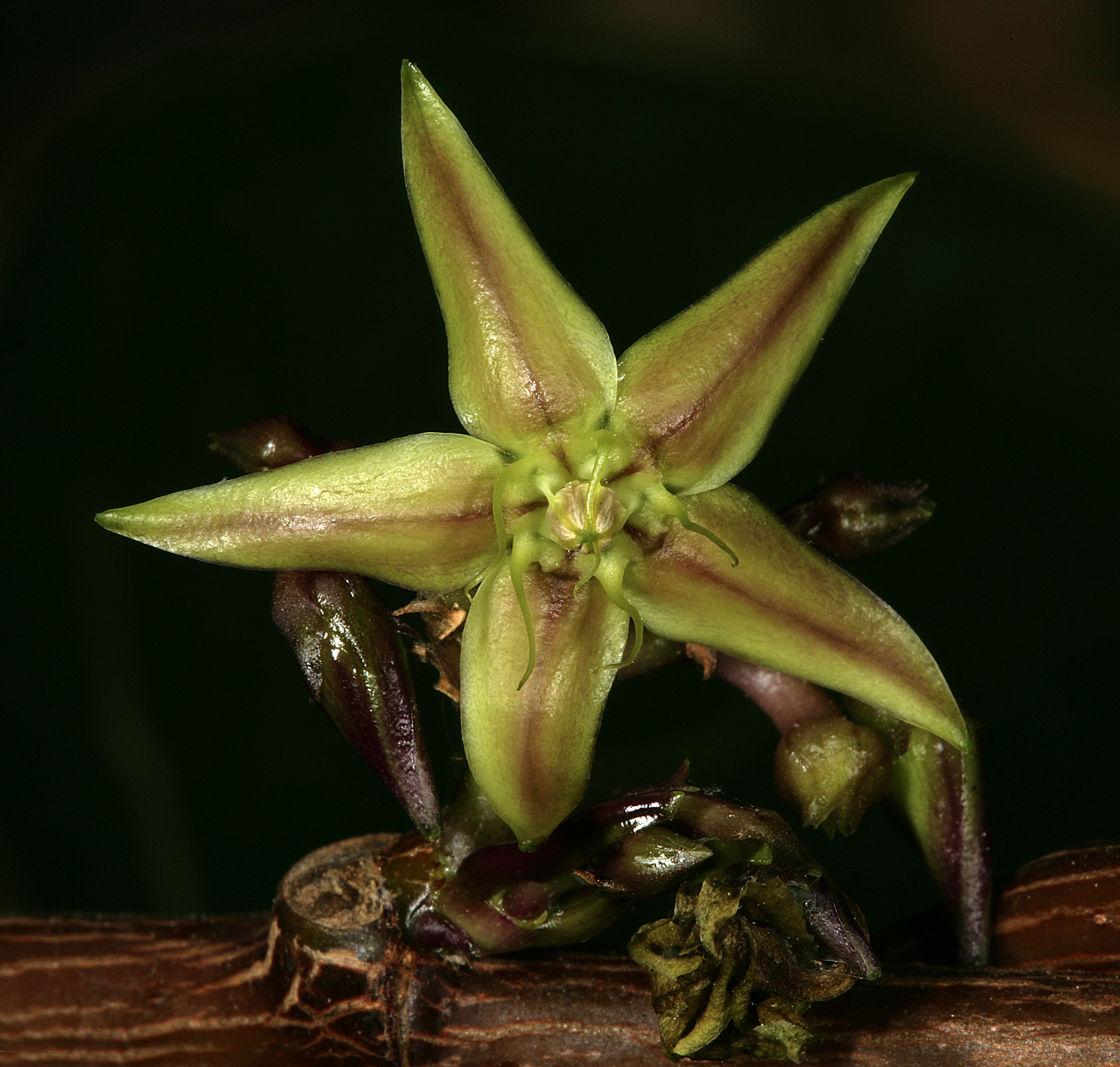

Conservation status
- Least Concern (IUCN 3.1)

Scientific classification
- Kingdom: Plantae
- Clade: Tracheophytes
- Clade: Angiosperms
- Clade: Eudicots
- Clade: Asterids
- Order: Gentianales
- Family: Apocynaceae
- Subfamily: Periplocoideae
- Genus: Ischnolepis
- Species: I. graminifolia

Binomial name
- Ischnolepis graminifolia (Costantin & Gallaud) Klack. (1999)

Synonyms
- Pentopetia graminifolia Costantin & Gallaud (1907); Ischnolepis tuberosa Jum. & H.Perrier (1909)

= Ischnolepis graminifolia =

Species of flowering plant

Ischnolepis graminifolia is a species of flowering plant in the dogbane family, Apocynaceae. It is a tuberous shrub endemic to Madagascar.
