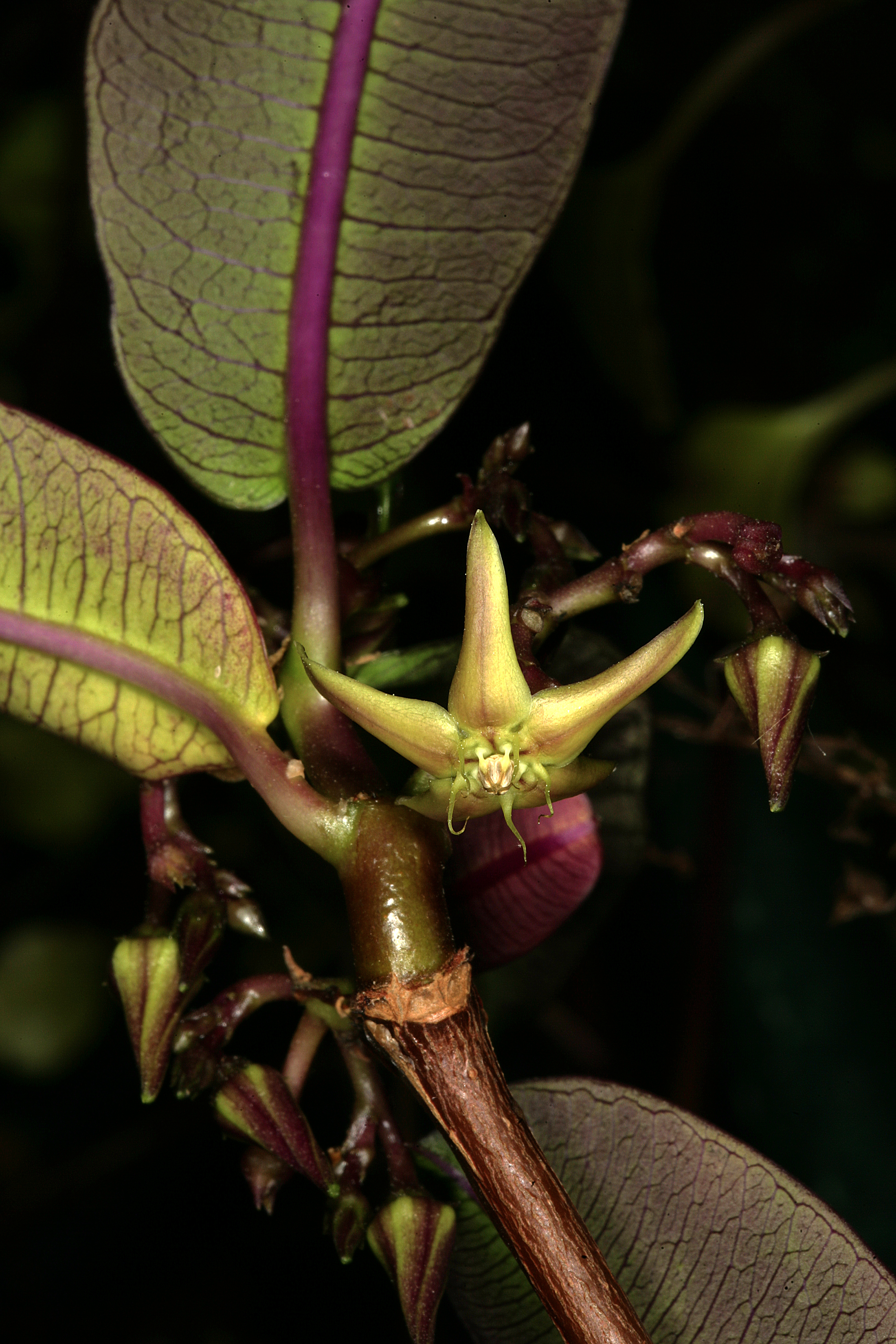
- Flower and leaves
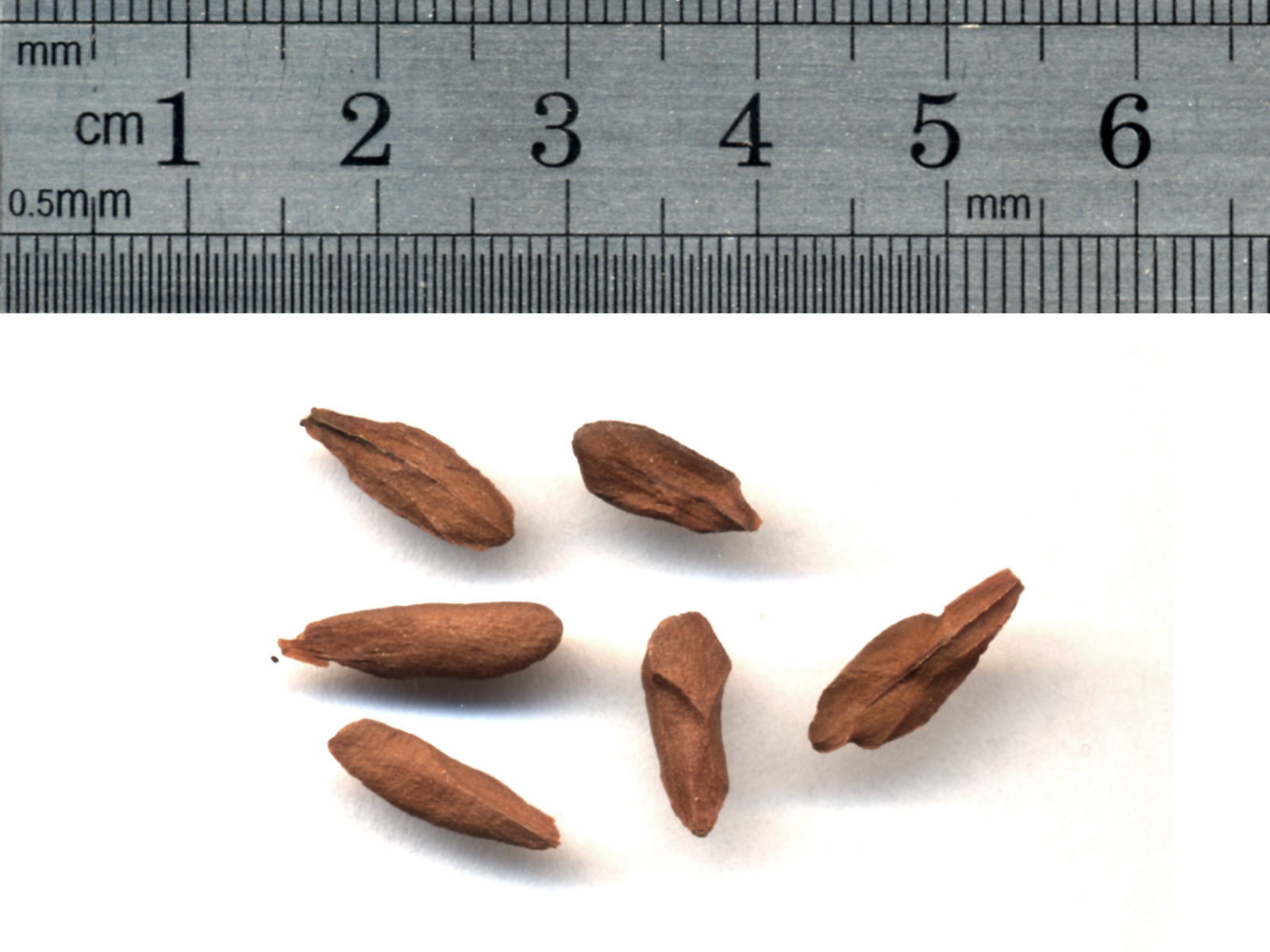
- Seeds

Scientific classification
- Kingdom: Plantae
- Clade: Tracheophytes
- Clade: Angiosperms
- Clade: Eudicots
- Clade: Asterids
- Order: Gentianales
- Family: Apocynaceae
- Subfamily: Periplocoideae
- Genus: Ischnolepis
- Species: I. natalensis

Binomial name
- Ischnolepis natalensis (Schltr.) Venter (2001)

Synonyms
- Pentopetia natalensis Schltr. (1894); Petopentia natalensis (Schltr.) Bullock (1954); Tacazzea natalensis (Schltr.) N.E.Br. (1907)

= Ischnolepis natalensis =

Genus of flowering plants

Ischnolepis natalensis is a climbing geophyte vine, commonly known as propeller vine, in the family Apocynaceae. It is native to Eastern Cape and KwaZulu-Natal provinces of South Africa.

It was formerly placed in the monotypic genus Petopetia, which was first described as a genus in 1954.
