= Ischnolepis =

Scientific classification
- Kingdom: Plantae
- Clade: Tracheophytes
- Clade: Angiosperms
- Clade: Eudicots
- Clade: Asterids
- Order: Gentianales
- Family: Apocynaceae
- Subfamily: Periplocoideae
- Genus: Ischnolepis; Jum. & H.Perrier

Synonyms
- Petopentia Bullock (1954)

Genus of flowering plants

Ischnolepis is a species of plants in the family Apocynaceae first described as a genus in 1909.

It contains two species:

- Ischnolepis graminifolia (Costantin & Gallaud) Klack. – Madagascar
- Ischnolepis natalensis (Schltr.) Venter – South Africa
