= Asterostemma repandum =

Scientific classification
- Kingdom: Plantae
- Clade: Tracheophytes
- Clade: Angiosperms
- Clade: Eudicots
- Clade: Asterids
- Order: Gentianales
- Family: Apocynaceae
- Subfamily: Asclepiadoideae
- Tribe: Marsdenieae
- Genus: Asterostemma; Decne. (1838)
- Species: A. repandum

Binomial name
- Asterostemma repandum Decne. (1838)

Genus of flowering plants

Asterostemma is a genus of flowering plants belonging to the family Apocynaceae. The genus contains a single species, Asterostemma repandum. It is native to eastern Java.
