= Vailia =

Scientific classification
- Kingdom: Plantae
- Clade: Tracheophytes
- Clade: Angiosperms
- Clade: Eudicots
- Clade: Asterids
- Order: Gentianales
- Family: Apocynaceae
- Subfamily: Asclepiadoideae
- Tribe: Asclepiadeae
- Genus: Vailia; Rusby
- Species: V. mucronata

Binomial name
- Vailia mucronata Rusby

Synonyms
- Blepharodon bolivianum Malme; Blepharodon peruvianum Schltr.

Species of flowering plant

Vailia is a monotypic genus of flowering plants belonging to the family Apocynaceae. It just contains one species, Vailia mucronata Rusby.

It is native to Bolivia, Ecuador and Peru.

The genus name of Vailia is in honour of Anna Murray Vail (1863–1955), an American botanist and first librarian of the New York Botanical Garden. The Latin specific epithet of mucronata means sharp-edged, from mucro, sword-point or edge. Both the genus and the species were first described and published in Bull. Torrey Bot. Club Vol.25 on page 500 in 1898.
