= Charles Edward Faxon =

American botanical artist (1846–1918)

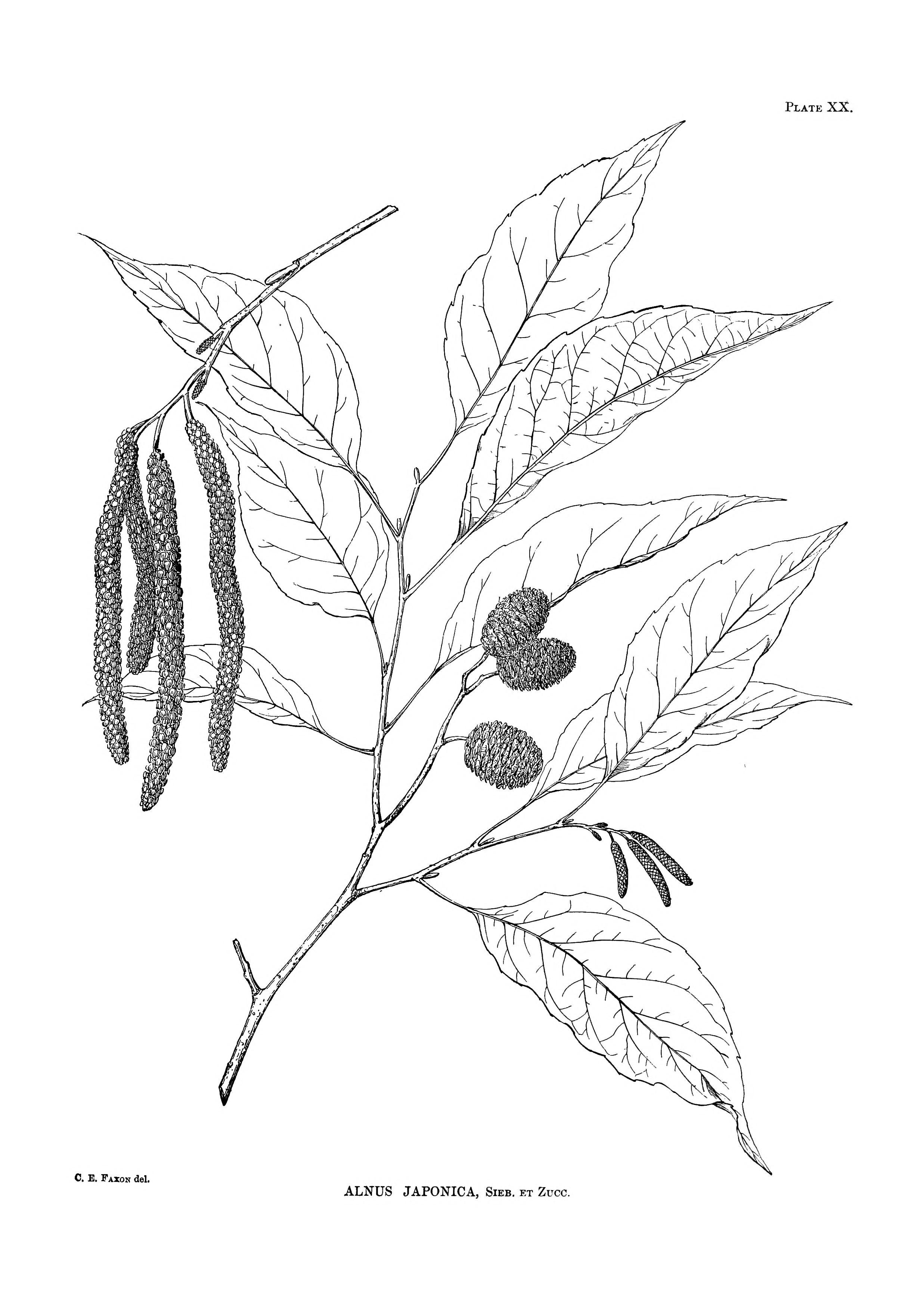
Alnus japonica Sieb. et Zucc

Charles Edward Faxon (January 21, 1846 – February 6, 1918) was an American botanical artist and instructor of botany born in Jamaica Plain, Massachusetts. The standard author abbreviation Faxon is used to indicate this person as the author when citing a botanical name.

In 1867 he received his degree in civil engineering from Lawrence Scientific School in Cambridge. From 1879 to 1884, he taught classes in botany at the Bussey Institute.

Faxon was knowledgeable in regards to the flora of New England, and in 1882 joined the staff at the Arnold Arboretum. Here he took charge of development of the herbarium and library. He worked closely with Charles Sprague Sargent (1841–1927), the director of the arboretum.

== Publications ==
Faxon created 744 plates for illustration of Sargent's "Silva of North America". In addition to these drawings, he provided the illustrative work for the following publications by Sargent:

- "Manual of the Trees of North America (exclusive of Mexico)", (664 illustrations).
- "Garden and Forest", (285 illustrations).
- "Forest Flora of Japan", (1894).
- "Trees and Shrubs: Illustrations of New Or Little Known Ligneous Plants", (1902–13).
