= Massariaceae =

Scientific classification
- Kingdom: Fungi
- Division: Ascomycota
- Class: Dothideomycetes
- Order: Pleosporales
- Family: Massariaceae; Nitschke (1869)

Type genus
- Massaria De Not. (1844)

Genera
- Massaria; Massarioramusculicola; Paramassaria

Family of fungi

The Massariaceae are a family of fungi in the order Pleosporales. It contains 3 genera and 33 species. Taxa in the family have a cosmopolitan distribution, but are better known in more temperate zones. Although the family is poorly known, it has been suggested that they are saprobic in wood and bark, with a few species being weak pathogens.
