= Joseph Decaisne =

French botanist and agronomist (1807-1882)

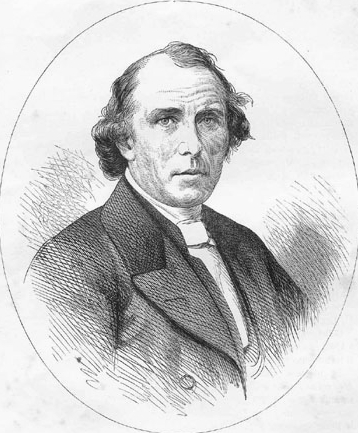
- Born: March 7, 1807; Brussels, France (now Belgium)
- Died: January 8, 1882 (aged 74); Paris, France
- Known for: Founding member of the Société botanique de France
- Scientific career
- Fields: Botany, Agronomy, Horticulture, Phycology
- Institutions: Muséum national d'histoire naturelle College de France Jardin des Plantes
- Academic advisors: Adrien-Henri de Jussieu
- Author abbrev. (botany): Decne.

Joseph Decaisne (7 March 1807 – 8 January 1882) was a French botanist and agronomist. He became an aide-naturaliste to Adrien-Henri de Jussieu (1797–1853), who served as the chair of rural botany. It was during this time that he began to study plants brought back by various travelers like those of Victor Jacquemont (1801–1832) from Asia. Decaisne used applied research, most notably on the agronomy of the madder, the yam and the ramie. He was also interested in algae.

== Biography ==
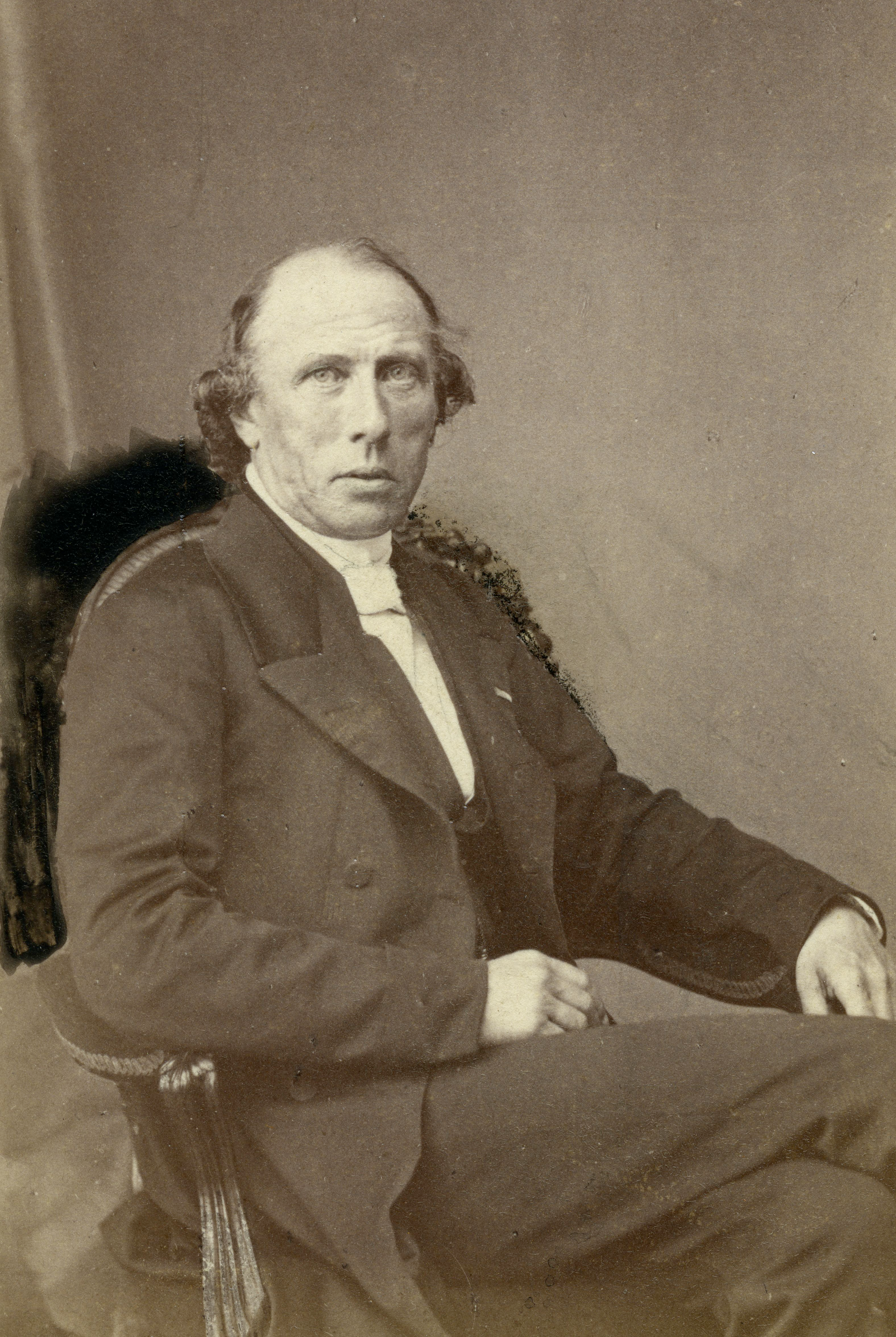
Around 1870

Although born in Brussels, Belgium, he exercised his activity exclusively in Paris. He entered in 1824 as a gardener at the Muséum national d'histoire naturelle (French museum of natural history) and became, in 1832, head of the carré des semis section. He also worked at the Jardin des Plantes and collaborated with Asa Gray.

In 1847 he chaired Statistical Agriculture department in the College de France.

In 1850, Decaisne followed Charles-François Brisseau de Mirbel (1776–1854) as the chair of horticulture at the Museum. In 1854 he participated in the creation of the Société botanique de France.

The genera Decaisnea Hook.f. & Thomson (Lardizabalaceae), Decaisnea Brongn. syn. of Prescottia Lindl., Decaisnina Tiegh. (Loranthaceae), Decaisnella (genus of fungi in the family Massariaceae), and Decaisnea Lindl. syn. of Tropidia Lindl. (Orchidaceae), were named in his honour.

He died in Paris on 8 January 1882.

== Contributions to plant taxonomy ==
He described the following genera of flowering plants: Capanea (now part of Kohleria) and Chrysothemis of the family Gesneriaceae; Sautiera (Acanthaceae); Lepinia, Rhazya (Apocynaceae); Vancouveria (with C.Morren) (Berberidaceae); Ostryopsis (Betulaceae); Dipterygium (Capparidaceae); Brassaiopsis, Cuphocarpus*, Dendropanax*, Didymopanax*, Fatsia*, Oreopanax*, Stilbocarpa*, (* with Planch.) (Araliaceae); Berneuxia (Diapensiaceae); Scyphogyne (Ericaceae); Akebia, Boquila (Lardizabalaceae); Galtonia (Liliaceae s.l. or Hyacinthaceae); Treculia Decne. ex Trecul (Moraceae; Camptotheca (Nyssaceae or Cornaceae); Ephippiandra (Monimiaceae); Pseudais (Thymelaeaceae); Allardia, Lecocarpus, Wollastonia DC. ex Decne. (Asteraceae); Gymnotheca (Saururaceae); Bougueria (Plantaginaceae); Docynia (Rosaceae); Seetzenia R.Br. ex Decne.(Zygophyllaceae); Deherainia (Theophrastaceae); Lopholepis (now a synonym of Perotis )(Poaceae); Asterostemma, Atherandra, Baeolepis Decne. ex Moq., Barjonia, Blepharodon, Calostigma, Camptocarpus, Decabelone, Decanema, Dictyanthus, Glossonema, Gongronema (Endl.) Decne., Harpanema, Hemipogon, Hoodia Sweet ex Decne., Ibatia, Macropetalum Burch. ex Decne., Melinia, Mitostigma (now part of Philibertia), Nautonia, Nephradenia, Orthosia, Pentopetia, Peplonia, Periglossum, Pherotrichis, Polystemma, Ptycanthera, Pycnoneurum, Pycnostelma Bunge ex Decne., Rhyssostelma, Riocreuxia, Tacazzea, Tassadia, Trichosandra (Asclepiadaceae or Apocynaceae s.l.); Amorphophallus Blume ex Decne. (Araceae) and Leptopus (Euphorbiaceae s.l. or Phyllanthaceae).

== Works ==
- Le jardin fruitier du Museum (The fructiferous garden of the Museum) in 9 volumes (1858–1875)
- Traité général de botanique descriptive et analytique (General Treatise of descriptive and analytic botany), Paris, Firmin-Didot, 1876 [in collaboration with Emmanuel Le Maout] English edition 1873.
- Mexicanas plantas (Plants of Mexico, 1872–1886 [in collaboration with others]. (available at Botanicus.org)

== Bibliography ==
- Le Maout, Emmanuel; Decaisne, Joseph (1873) [1867]. Hooker, Joseph Dalton (ed.). A General System of Botany, Descriptive and Analytical in two parts [Traité général de botanique]. trans. Frances Harriet Hooker. London: Longmans Green.
