= Stonecrop Gardens =

Public garden

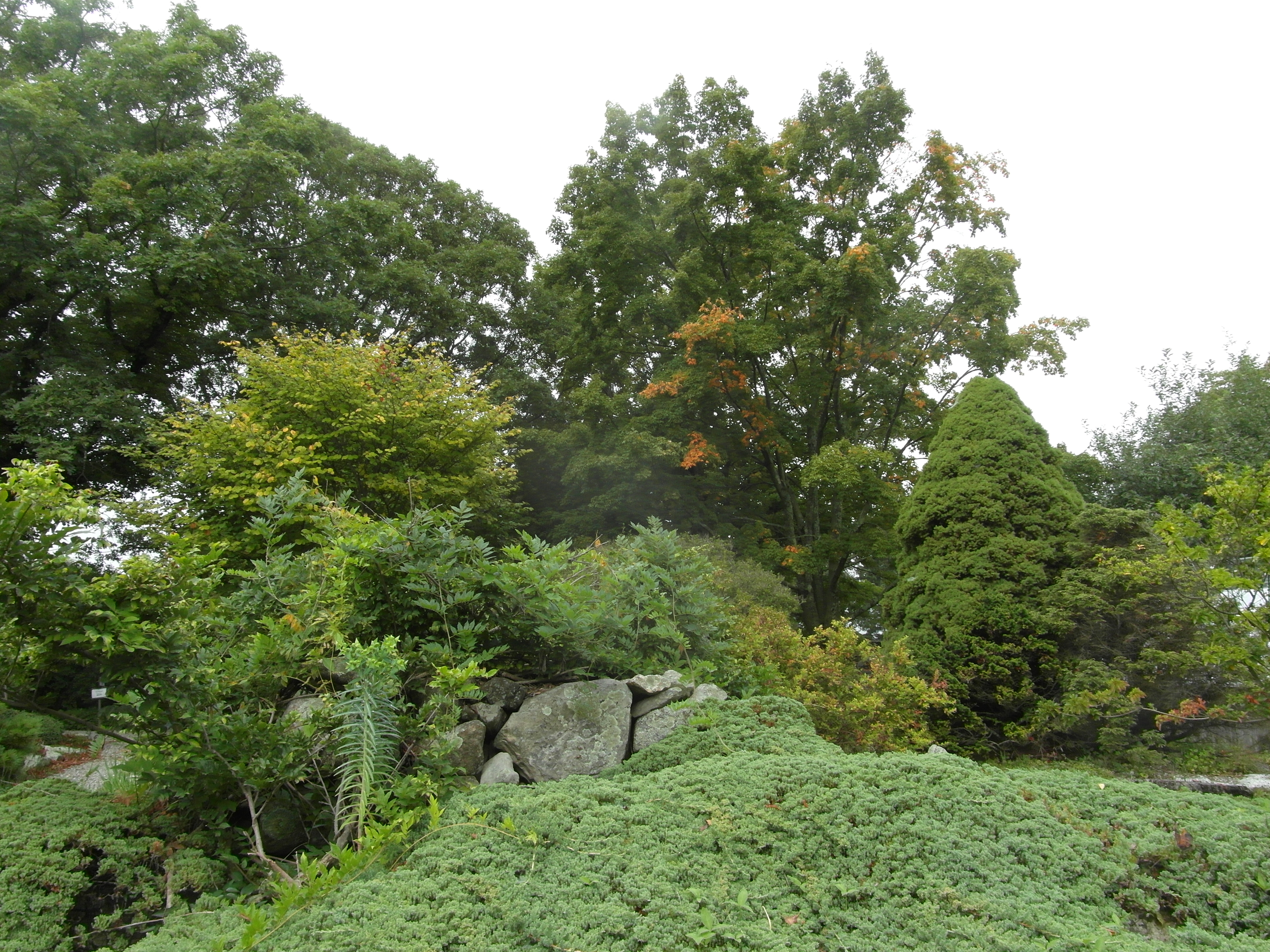
- Stonecrop Gardens
- Formation: 1992
- Founder: Frank Cabot
- Type: Nonprofit public garden
- Location: Cold Spring, New York, U.S.
- Coordinates: 41°26′33″N 73°52′09″W
- Members: The Garden Conservancy
- Key people: Caroline Burgess
- Website: www.stonecrop.org/visitor-information/

Stonecrop Gardens is a public garden in Cold Spring, New York, U.S. Formerly the home of Anne and Frank Cabot, the founder of The Garden Conservancy, the ground became a public garden in 1992, directed by Caroline Burgess. A variety of gardens include woodland and water gardens, a bamboo grove, stone beds with alpine flowers, systematic flower beds and an enclosed English flower garden.

== History ==
Stonecrop Gardens began as the private property of garden designers Anne and Frank Cabot, who built a manor house as their private residence, in Cold Spring, New York, in 1958. Frank Cabot founded The Garden Conservancy in 1989 and after his death the property was passed to a nonprofit corporation, which uses the house as the headquarters for running the gardens.

Commissioned by the Cabots, the English horticulturalist Caroline Burgess helped, from the mid-1980s, to transform the gardens to a public garden which was opened in 1992. She has remained the director and kept diversifying the display gardens. The gardens are shown on tours among other public gardens of the area.

== Gardens ==
Stonecrop Gardens are located in the Hudson Highlands at a height of 1,100 feet (340 m). They show, across an area of 12 acres (4.9 ha), a variety of landscape gardens and a vegetable garden. They are reached by an unpaved road.

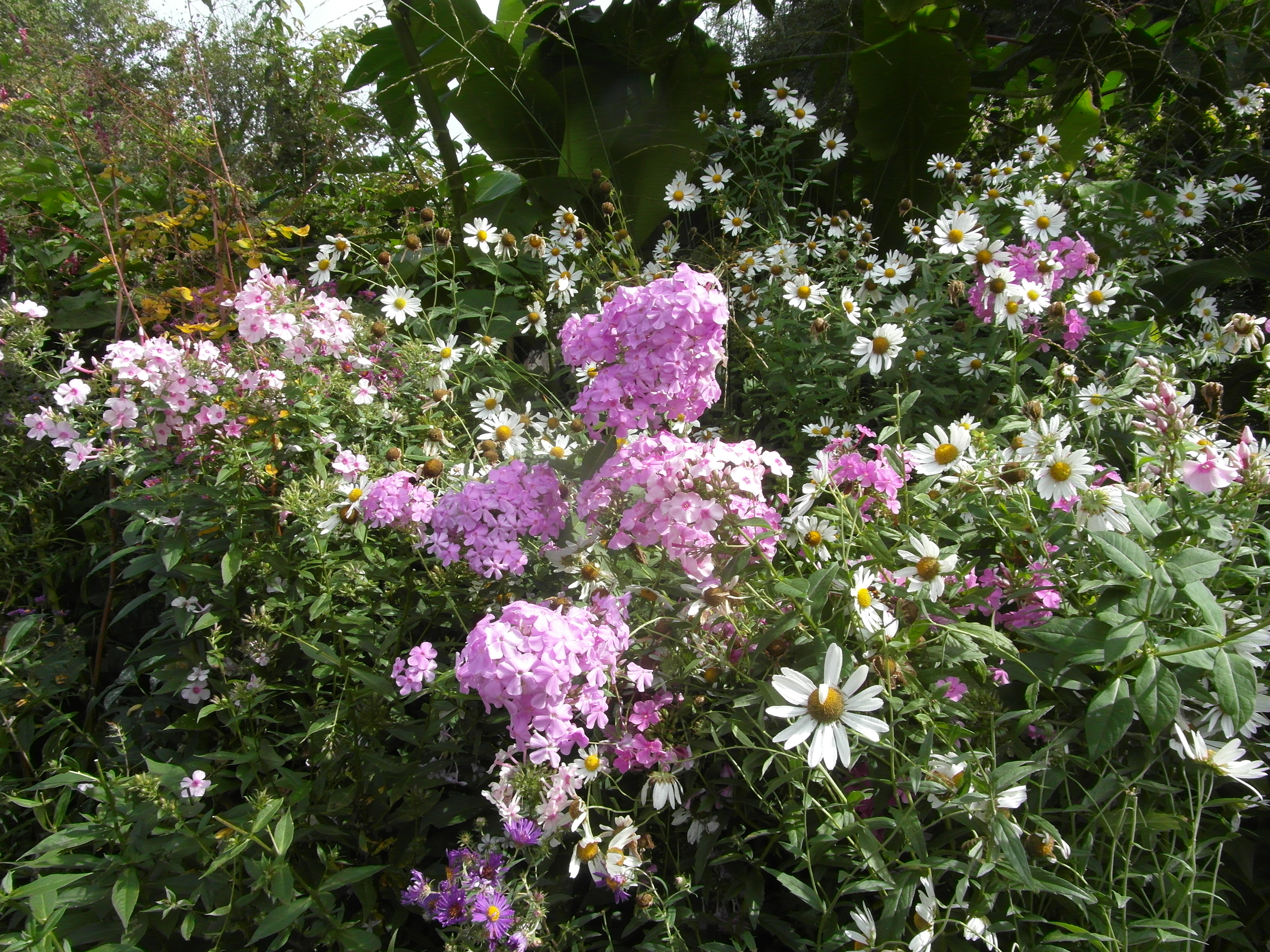
Flowerbeds

The grounds include woodland and water gardens, a grass garden and a bamboo grove, a rock garden and stone beds with alpine flowers and flower beds of perennials. Blooming plants include Ruta graveolens, Salvia uliginosa and Oxypetalum coeruleum. Systematic order flower beds show more than 50 plant families. An enclosed English flower garden, called "inner sanctum", is enclosed by walls covered with shrubs and roses. Beds of lilies show more than 75 varieties in many colors and shapes. A vegetable garden is protected by a scarecrow named Miss Gertrude Jekyll, after the garden designer who created more than 400 gardens in Europe, especially the UK, and the U.S. The gardens also feature a conservatory and a "display alpine house".
