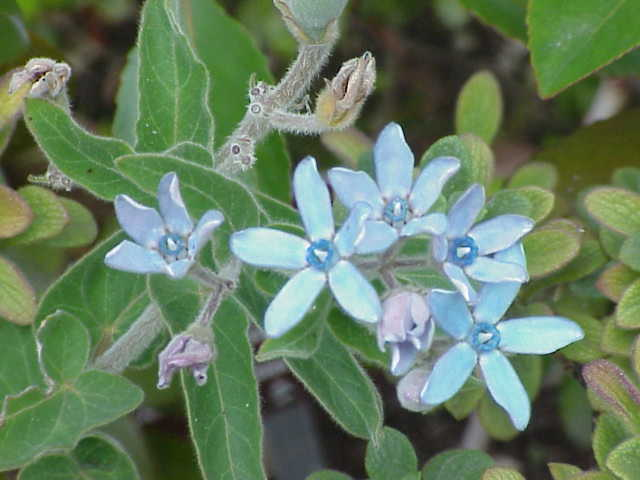
- Oxypetalum coeruleum, flowers

Scientific classification
- Kingdom: Plantae
- Clade: Embryophytes
- Clade: Tracheophytes
- Clade: Angiosperms
- Clade: Eudicots
- Clade: Asterids
- Order: Gentianales
- Family: Apocynaceae
- Subfamily: Asclepiadoideae
- Tribe: Asclepiadeae
- Genus: Oxypetalum; R.Br., conserved name

Synonyms
- Amblyopetalum (Griseb.) Malme; Bustelma E.Fourn., Fl. Bras. 6(4): 288 (1885); Calostigma Decne.; Corollonema Schltr.; Cystostemma E.Fourn., Fl. Bras. 6(4): 204 (1885); Dactylostelma Schltr.; Gothofreda Vent., nom. rej.; Metoxypetalum Morillo; Pachyglossum Decne.; Rhyssostelma Decne.; Schistogyne Hook. & Arn.; Schizostemma Decne.; Widgrenia Malme

= Oxypetalum =

Genus of neotropical flowering plants

Oxypetalum is a genus of flowering plants in the family Apocynaceae, first described with this name in 1810. The genus is native to South America.

Oxypetalum coeruleum is cultivated as an ornamental.

== Species ==
As of November 2023, Plants of the World Online accepted the following species:

- Oxypetalum acerosum Malme – Paraguay
- Oxypetalum aequaliflorum E.Fourn. – Brazil
- Oxypetalum albicans Schltr. – Brazil
- Oxypetalum alpinum (Vell.) Fontella & E.A.Schwarz – Brazil
- Oxypetalum appendiculatum Mart. – Paraguay, Brazil
- Oxypetalum arachnoideum E.Fourn. – Rio de Janeiro
- Oxypetalum arenicola Hauman ex Lillo – Argentina
- Oxypetalum argentinum Malme – Argentina
- Oxypetalum arnottianum H.Buek – Brazil
- Oxypetalum attenuatum (Rusby) Malme – Bolivia
- Oxypetalum aurantiacum Malme ex Chodat & Hassl. – Paraguay
- Oxypetalum balansae Malme – Paraguay
- Oxypetalum banksii R.Br. ex Schult. – Bahia
- Oxypetalum barberoanum T.Mey. – Paraguay
- Oxypetalum boliviense Schltr. – Bolivia
- Oxypetalum boudetii Fontella & Goes – Brazil (Espírito Santo)
- Oxypetalum brachystemma Malme – Argentina, Bolivia
- Oxypetalum brachystephanum (Malme) Malme – Paraguay
- Oxypetalum brussae H.A.Keller & Andrés González – Uruguay
- Oxypetalum capitatum Mart. – Brazil, Bolivia, Venezuela, Guyana, Suriname
- Oxypetalum ceratostemma Malme – Paraguay
- Oxypetalum charrua T.Mey. – Brazil, Argentina, Chile
- Oxypetalum chodatianum Malme – Paraguay
- Oxypetalum coalitum E.Fourn. – Brazil
- Oxypetalum coccineum -Griseb. – Argentina
- Oxypetalum coeruleum (D.Don ex Sweet) Decne. – Argentina
- Oxypetalum commersonianum (Decne.) Fontella & E.A.Schwarz – Uruguay
- Oxypetalum confusum Malme – Rio Grande do Sul
- Oxypetalum cordifolium (Vent.) Schltr. – widespread from Cuba + San Luis Potosí south to Peru
- Oxypetalum corymbosum (Malme) Liede & Meve – eastern Bolivia to Paraguay, northeastern Argentina (Corrientes), and eastern Brazil
- Oxypetalum costae Occhioni – Rio de Janeiro
- Oxypetalum crispum Wight ex Hook. & Arn. – Bolivia, S Brazil
- Oxypetalum dactylostelma Goyder – Bolivia
- Oxypetalum deltoideum E.Fourn. – Brazil (Rio de Janeiro)
- Oxypetalum dombeyanum Decne. – Peru and Bolivia
- Oxypetalum dusenii Malme – Paraná
- Oxypetalum ekblomii Malme – Matto Grosso
- Oxypetalum erectum Mart. – Minas Gerais
- Oxypetalum erianthum Decne. – Goiás
- Oxypetalum erostre E.Fourn. – Brazil
- Oxypetalum fiebrigii (Malme) Goyder & Rapini – Bolivia, Argentina
- Oxypetalum filamentosum Malme – Paraguay
- Oxypetalum flavopurpureum Goyder & Fontella – Bolivia, Peru
- Oxypetalum foliosum Mart. – São Paulo
- Oxypetalum fontellae S.A.Cáceres – northern Argentina
- Oxypetalum fuscum Goyder & Fontella – Bolivia
- Oxypetalum glabrescens Malme – Paraguay
- Oxypetalum glaziovianum Loes. – Brazil
- Oxypetalum glaziovii (E.Fourn.) Fontella & Marquete – Brazil
- Oxypetalum globosum C.Ezcurra & C.M.Martín – Argentina (Salta)
- Oxypetalum glomeratum E.Fourn. – Brazil (Minas Gerais)
- Oxypetalum gracile T.Mey. – N Argentina
- Oxypetalum guaraniticum (Malme) Malme – Argentina
- Oxypetalum gyrophyllum Farinaccio & Mello-Silva – Rio de Janeiro, São Paulo
- Oxypetalum habrogynum Farinaccio – Parque Nacional da Serra da Canastra in Minas Gerais
- Oxypetalum harleyi (Fontella & Goyder) Farin. – NE Brazil
- Oxypetalum helios Farinaccio – Parque Nacional da Serra da Canastra in Minas Gerais
- Oxypetalum heptalobum Goyder & Rapini – Bolivia
- Oxypetalum hilarianum E.Fourn. – Rio Grande do Sul in Brazil, Misiones in Argentina
- Oxypetalum hoehnei Malme – Paraná
- Oxypetalum humile (Morong) Hassl. – Paraguay
- Oxypetalum incanum E.Fourn. – São Paulo
- Oxypetalum insigne (Decne.) Malme – São Paulo
- Oxypetalum jacobinae Decne. – Bahia
- Oxypetalum joergensenii T.Mey – Argentina
- Oxypetalum kassneri H.A.Keller & Funez – Brazil (Santa Catarina)
- Oxypetalum kleinii Fontella & Marquete – Santa Catarina
- Oxypetalum kuhlmannianum Occhioni – Minas Gerais
- Oxypetalum laciniatum Rapini & Farinaccio – Brazil (Bahia)
- Oxypetalum lanatum Decne. ex E.Fourn. – Serra dos Órgãos in Rio de Janeiro
- Oxypetalum leonii Malme – Minas Gerais
- Oxypetalum lineare Decne. – São Paulo
- Oxypetalum lividum Farinaccio – Peru
- Oxypetalum longipedunculatum (Malme) Goyder & Rapini – northwestern Argentina
- Oxypetalum lutescens E.Fourn. – Rio de Janeiro
- Oxypetalum lynchianum T.Mey. – Chaco in Argentina
- Oxypetalum macrolepis (Hook. & Arn.) Decne. – southern Brazil, Paraguay, Uruguay, and northeastern Argentina
- Oxypetalum malmei Hoehne – Paraná
- Oxypetalum marambaiense Occhioni – Brazil (Rio de Janeiro)
- Oxypetalum marchesii C.Ezcurra & A.González – Uruguay
- Oxypetalum marginatum Malme – Brazil (Mato Grosso do Sul, São Paulo, and Paraná) and Paraguay (Sierra de Maracayú)
- Oxypetalum marianae H.A.Keller & Funez – Brazil (Santa Catarina)
- Oxypetalum martii E.Fourn. – Bahia
- Oxypetalum megapotamicum Spreng. – southern Brazil, Uruguay, and northeastern Argentina
- Oxypetalum melinioides Goyder – Minas Gerais
- Oxypetalum microphyllum Hook. & Arn. – Mountains of Rio Jacquy in Brazil
- Oxypetalum minarum E.Fourn. – Brazil
- Oxypetalum molle Hook. & Arn. – Santa Catarina
- Oxypetalum montanum Mart. – Jiambe da Villa do Principe in Brazil
- Oxypetalum morilloanum Fontella – Santa Catarina
- Oxypetalum mosenii (Malme) Malme – Rio Grande do Sul
- Oxypetalum multiflorum (Malme) Malme – Brazil (Minas Gerais)
- Oxypetalum muticum E.Fourn. – Brazil
- Oxypetalum nanum Malme – Paraguay
- Oxypetalum nigricans (Decne.) Liede & Meve – Uruguay
- Oxypetalum nitidum Malme – São Paulo
- Oxypetalum obtusifolium Malme – Paraná
- Oxypetalum ophiuroideum Malme – Sierra de Maracayú in Paraguay
- Oxypetalum ostenii Malme – Argentina
- Oxypetalum pachyglossum Decne. – Bahia, São Paulo
- Oxypetalum pachygynum Decne. – Minas Gerais
- Oxypetalum pannosum Decne. – Brazil
- Oxypetalum pardense E.Fourn. – Brazil
- Oxypetalum parviflorum (Decne.) Decne. – Rio Grande do Sul
- Oxypetalum patulum E.Fourn. – Brazil
- Oxypetalum pearsonii (Rusby) Goyder & Fontella – Rurrenabaque in Bolivia
- Oxypetalum pentasetum (Rusby) Goyder & Rapini – Yungas in Bolivia
- Oxypetalum pilosum Malme – Pedra Bonita in Brazil
- Oxypetalum polyanthum (Hoehne) Rapini – Brazil
- Oxypetalum pubescens (Malme) Goyder & Rapini – northwestern Argentina
- Oxypetalum radinsii H.A.Keller – Argentina (Misiones)
- Oxypetalum rariflorum Malme – Brazil (Paraná and Rio Grande do Sul)
- Oxypetalum reflexum Malme – Sierra de Amambay in Paraguay
- Oxypetalum regnellii (Malme) Malme – Minas Gerais
- Oxypetalum reitzii Fontella and Marquete – Santa Catarina
- Oxypetalum retusum (Markgr.) Goyder – Peru
- Oxypetalum rojasianum Malme – Paraguay
- Oxypetalum rusticum Rapini – Espinhaço Range in Minas Gerais
- Oxypetalum schenkii K.Schum. – Brazil (Rio de Janeiro)
- Oxypetalum schottii Fourn. – Brazil (Rio de Janeiro)
- Oxypetalum schulzii Malme – northeastern Argentina and Uruguay
- Oxypetalum solanoides Hook. & Arn. – Buenos Aires Province in Argentina
- Oxypetalum stipatum Malme – Brazil
- Oxypetalum strictum Mart. – Brazil
- Oxypetalum subcapitatum Malme – Sierra de Maracayú in Paraguay
- Oxypetalum subhirtellum Miq. – Brazil (Minas Gerais)
- Oxypetalum sublanatum Malme – southeastern and southern Brazil and Argentina (Misiones)
- Oxypetalum suboppositum Malme – Paraguay
- Oxypetalum sylvestre (Hook. & Arn.) Goyder & Rapini – southern Brazil (Rio Grande do Sul), Paraguay, Uruguay, and northeastern Argentina
- Oxypetalum teyucuarense Farinaccio & H.A.Keller – northeastern Argentina (Misiones)
- Oxypetalum timbense H.A.Keller – southern Brazil (Santa Catarina)
- Oxypetalum tomentosum Wight ex Hook. & Arn. – Maldonado in Uruguay
- Oxypetalum tubatum Malme – Paraná
- Oxypetalum tucumanense (T.Mey.) Goyder & Rapini – Argentina (Jujuy, Tucumán)
- Oxypetalum urceolatum Farinaccio & Goyder – Bolivia
- Oxypetalum venustum H.A.Keller – northeastern Argentina (Corrientes)
- Oxypetalum warmingii (E.Fourn.) Fontella & Marquete – Brazil
- Oxypetalum weberbaueri Schltr. – Peru
- Oxypetalum wightianum Hook. & Arn. – Brazil

formerly included

moved to other genera (Cynanchum, Morrenia, Philibertia, Tassadia, Tweedia)

1. O. andinum now Tweedia andina
2. O. angustifolium now Tweedia birostrata
3. O. berteroanum now Tassadia berteroanum
4. O. brevipes now Tweedia birostrata
5. O. brunonis now Tweedia brunonis
6. O. echegarayi now Tweedia echegarayi
7. O. kingii now Tweedia echegarayi
8. O. niveum now Philibertia nivea
9. O. rusbyi now Cynanchum rusbyi
10. O. scalae now Morrenia scalae
11. O. variegatum now Morrenia variegata
