= Tenório Jr. =

Francisco Tenório Júnior
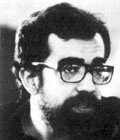
- undated photo of Francisco Tenório Júnior

Background information
- Also known as: Tenório Jr. Tenorinho
- Born: Francisco Tenório Cerqueira Júnior; July 4, 1940; Rio de Janeiro, Brazil
- Died: c. March 1976 (age 35) Buenos Aires, Argentina
- Genres: Bossa Nova, Jazz, Samba, MPB
- Occupation: Musician
- Instrument: Piano
- Years active: 1960–1976

Francisco Tenório Júnior (born July 4, 1940 in Rio de Janeiro – disappeared and dead in March, 1976) was a Brazilian musician and composer. Despite recording only one album as a solo artist, he was considered one of the best pianists of his generation, and his fame as a virtuoso creator has increased over the years.

Tenório Júnior went missing under mysterious circumstances in Argentina during the first year of that country's last civil-military dictatorship: in March 1976, while on tour at Buenos Aires with Toquinho and Vinícius de Moraes, he went out one night to buy cigarettes, and he was never seen again; it was quickly surmised that he might have been rounded up by the dictatorship's security forces and supposedly kidnapped, being subsequently thrown in jail, tortured and murdered.

== Biography ==
Born and raised in the neighborhood of Laranjeiras, in Rio de Janeiro, he was considered one of the most important musicians of bossa nova. Simultaneously with his development as a musician Tenório Júnior was studying (but didn't finish) medicine at the National School of Medicine, and quickly became in the 1970s one of the Brazilian professionals most sought after by artists. He used to perform at Beco das Garrafas (Alley of the Bottles), a place in Copacabana famous for being one of the redoubts in which bossa nova emerged.

His piano can be heard on anthological albums of Brazilian music such as Arte Maior (1963) by Leny Andrade (with the "Tenório Jr. Trio"), Edison Machado é Samba Novo (1964) by Edison Machado, O LP (1964) by Os Cobras, Vagamente (1964) by Wanda Sá and Desenhos (1966) by Victor Assis Brasil.

== Disappearance ==
In 1976, after a show in Buenos Aires, in which he accompanied with a great performance the famous musicians Vinicius de Moraes and Toquinho, Tenório Júnior disappeared without a trace. At first, it was not known whether he was in any prison or if he died in Argentina. At the time several versions ran, as quoted by singer Elis Regina in an interview to Folha de S.Paulo on 3 June 1979, that he had been seen in jail in La Plata City; this was never confirmed.

Ten years after his disappearance, Claudio Vallejos, a former corporal and member of the Naval Information Service, the Secret Service of the Argentine Navy, revealed to the defunct magazine Senhor (n° 270, May 1986), that Tenório Júnior had been approached on the street by a military patrol and arrested. According to Vallejos, Brazilian authorities had been informed of the kidnapping and death of Tenório Júnior. Vallejos said Tenório Júnior was imprisoned in the ESMA (Navy Mechanics School); a notorious clandestine center and apparatus of repression of the Argentine Navy that existed between 1976 and 1979 and, according to reports and complaints, was the scene of almost five thousand murders.

In the book Operación Condor: Pacto Criminal (Operation Condor: Criminal Pact), launched in Mexico in 2001, the journalist Stella Calloni says Tenório Júnior was tortured by Brazilian and Argentine officials, including a Brazilian Army major Souza Vieira Baptista. The story of Calloni converges with the interview Claudio Vallejos published in the magazine Senhor, in which the former Argentine military claimed that Brazilian agents had been present during the execution of Tenório Júnior, which occurred nine days after his arrest. The executor could have been the infamous Alfredo Astiz, a frigate former captain of the Argentine Navy also implicated in the murder and forced disappearance of dozens of people and sentenced to life imprisonment in 2011 for crimes against humanity, carried on by Astiz during Argentina's last military dictatorship.

Francisco Tenório Júnior was 35 years old at the time of his disappearance, leaving behind four children and his wife, Carmen Cerqueira Magalhaes, who was pregnant at the time of his disappearance. His fifth child was born one month after his disappearance.

=== Investigation ===
The National Commission on the Disappearance of Persons confirmed that Tenório Júnior's death took place in March 1976 in Buenos Aires. The Commission was created by President Raúl Alfonsín on 15 December 1983, shortly after the return of democracy, to investigate the fate of the desaparecidos (victims of forced disappearance) and other human rights violations during the military dictatorship. Its final report, Nunca Más (Never Again), gave details of the Commission's investigation research and was published in Spanish. It was delivered to Alfonsín on 20 September 1984.

=== Identification ===
In 13 September 2025, the Argentinian Forensical Anthropology Team announced having identified Tenório Jr's body through its fingerprints. In 20 March 1976, a dead body was found in a vacant lot in Don Torcuato, in Tigre partido, with several bullet wounds. At the time, the coroner did not consider an autopsy necessary, and the body was buried without identification in the Benavidez cemetery. In 2025 the fingerprints in the body's registry were compared and matched with Tenório's Brazilian registry.

== Legacy ==
Soon after the disappearance of Tenório Júnior, the Brazilian filmmaker Rogerio Lima produced the 16 mm short film Balada para Tenório (A ballad for Tenório), which chronicled the disappearance of Tenório Júnior and interviews his family and friends.

In 1986, when former Argentinian corporal Claudio Vallejos came to Brazil and gave a revealing interview to Senhor, the production house Videcom of São Paulo, along with Rogério Lima, managed to record his testimony, which was used as the basis for a documentary about Tenório Júnior, which chronicles the tragedy that befell on the musician. Vallejos was arrested as determined by the then Minister of Justice, Paulo Brossard, days after the publication of the interview. In August 1987, in a new interview with Senhor, the former agent said he suffered during his brief imprisonment, threats of men in federal police and received the recommendation not to insist on references to the omission of the Brazilian embassy and the involvement of Brazilian agents in the death of Tenório Júnior.

The documentary had its premiere at the 1986 Film and Video Festival of Rio de Janeiro, one day before the premiere Claudio Vallejos was expelled from Brazil, after three months in prison, without having been subjected to a process. In the video, the lawyer Luiz Eduardo Greenhalgh stated he believes that Tenório Júnior died in prison and that he had been arrested by mistake, "He was in the wrong place at the wrong time carrying an ID from the Musicians Union". According to people close to the pianist, Tenório Júnior, although being the son of a police chief, had never expressed political and ideological preferences. In an interview in 2003, Toquinho said that Tenório Júnior physical appearance may have contributed to his arrest: "Tenorio was of a unique kind, very tall, with beard, long hair, wore a long cloak, was mistaken for someone else".

In 1996, the Videcom documentary was updated with unpublished archive images, reedited and presented by the public TV network TV Cultura of São Paulo.

Claudio Vallejos returned to Brazil (supposedly around 2002) and settled in the region Chapecó in Santa Catarina. He was arrested in 2010 for embezzlement and forgery. Released some time later, he was again arrested for larceny in January 2012. His arrest had been requested to Interpol by the Argentine federal prosecutor who handles the criminal proceedings linked to Operation Condor, the military-political alliance between the dictatorships of Argentina, Brazil, Chile and Uruguay in the 1970s and 1980s, which was sponsored by the United States government. When the identity of Vallejos was confirmed, the prosecutor petitioned the Brazilian government for his extradition to Argentina. On 27 March 2013, Vallejos was delivered by Federal Police to Argentine police at the airport in Florianópolis.

Fernando Trueba and Javier Mariscal released the animated feature film They Shot the Piano Player (Dispararon Al Pianista), about Tenório's disappearance, in 2022. As Trueba, had for years plans for a feature film about Tenório he used interviews he had done as script research, as the basis for the animation. A journalist (fictional character) played by Jeff Goldblum, follows Tenorio's music career and interviews musicians, family and friends in way to tell the musician's tragic story.

Now, with this identification of Tenório's body, buried in 1976 as a homeless person, 50 years of uncertainty have been resolved.

Although the exact identity of the killers is unknown, forensic experts estimated that Tenório Jr.'s death occurred up to 48 hours before the Argentine police found him. This means that the murder occurred the same night Tenório Jr. disappeared on the streets of Buenos Aires. Therefore, both Claudio Vallejos's testimony and the assumptions raised in the books and articles cited here about his arrest and torture at the "Escuela de Mecánica de la Armada (ESMA)" proved unfounded.

Tenório Jr. was shot five times shortly after his capture, undoubtedly at the hands of Argentine security forces.

== See also ==
- List of people who disappeared mysteriously: 1910–1990

== Discography ==
=== As leader ===
- Embalo (1964) featuring; "Embalo" (3:10), "Inútil Paisagem" 2:26, "Nebulosa" 1:54, "Samadhi" (3:08), "Sambinha" (2:45), "Fim de Semana Em Eldorado" (4:10), "Néctar" (2:35), "Nuvens" (Clouds) (3:56), "Consolação" (2:26), "Estou Nessa Agora" (1:36), "Carnaval Sem Assunto" (2:02)

=== As accompanist ===
- Edison Machado é Samba Novo (1963), accompanying Edison Machado
- O LP (1964), with Os Cobras
- Vagamente (1964), accompanying Wanda Sá
- Doris Monteiro (1964), accompanying Doris Monteiro
- Índia (1973), accompanying Gal Costa
- Beto Guedes - Danilo Caymmi - Novelli - Toninho Horta (1973), accompanying the eponymous musicians
- Missa Breve (1973), accompanying Edu Lobo
- Egberto Gismonti (1973), accompanying Egberto Gismonti
- Academia de Danças (1974), accompanying Egberto Gismonti
- Nós (1974), accompanying Johnny Alf
- Bossa Nova nos "States" (1962), accompanying Juarez Araújo
- A Arte Maior de Leny Andrade (1964), accompanying Leny Andrade
- Minas (1975), accompanying Milton Nascimento
- Nana Caymmi (1975), accompanying Nana Caymmi
- Samba Nova Concepção (1964), (Various Artists)
- Desenhos (1966), accompanying Victor Assis Brasil
