= Joseph P. Day =

American businessman (1873–1944)

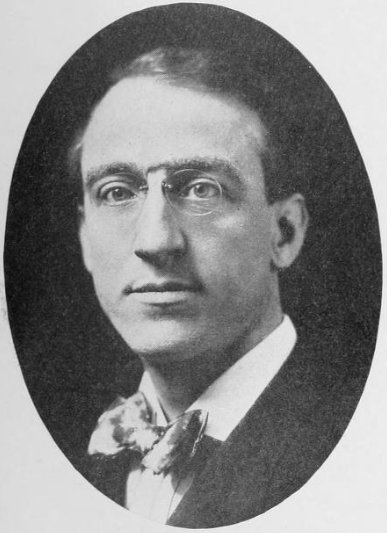
- Born: September 2, 1873; New York City, US
- Died: April 10, 1944 (aged 70); New York City, US
- Occupations: Real estate broker, auctioneer

Joseph Paul Day (September 2, 1873 – April 10, 1944) was a real estate broker and pioneer auctioneer active in New York City from 1895 until his death.

== Early life ==
Day was born in New York City to John W. Day, a successful producer of soda water and Catherine A. (née Hayes). His father died when Joseph was 5, and his mother died 9 years later, forcing him to quit public school at age 14 to work as a clerk in a wholesale dry goods outfit.

== Career ==
Day worked briefly for an insurance and real estate company before opening his own real estate company at the age of 21 with offices at 98 Fifth Avenue in Manhattan. His business grew rapidly, necessitating moves to progressively larger offices. He auctioned land on Manhattan Beach as early as 1904. In 1907 he sold 2,000 lots in New York in six auctions, one of the most successful lot sales ever held in New York City. He sold $100 million of real estate between 1907 and 1909. A year later he sold $81 million worth of real estate.

On October 11, 1910, Day held the first real estate auction at night at the Terrace Garden at 58th Street near 3rd Avenue in New York. That night he sold 297 Bronx lots on Hunts Point Avenue and adjoining streets for the developers of Hunts Point Estate.

He announced plans in 1916 to build 114 homes and many amenities at Brooklyn's Manhattan Beach. The project was completed in the 1920s and was featured on the cover of Life Magazine as "Life Goes to a Party at Joseph Day's Manhattan Beach Baths". It was billed as the "World's Largest Privately Owned Playground."

During his career, Day sold about one-third of the Bronx and one-third of Queens, plus was involved in many sales in Brooklyn, Westchester, and North New Jersey. He also developed a project in San Clemente, California, that included 500 buildings and 1,000 residences.

Day was a driving force in the real estate market of New York City. An article on William Hassler (1887–1921), who photographically mapped of the city of New York after the consolidation of the five Boroughs in 1898, mentions Day. Hassler utilized the Cirkut camera apparatus to do the laborious work. His primary client from 1911 to 1921 was Joseph P. Day Realtors and Auctioneers.

By 1933, Day was an early, vocal and substantial proponent of long-term mortgages.

== Family life ==
Joseph P. Day and Pauline (née Pope) married in 1898. Their children were Joseph P. Jr., Bernard P., Charles P., and Fairfield P., and Pauline Pope French and Lora Taylor Pope Barrett. The family had two main homes, a city home in Gramercy Park, and the family estate called Pleasant Days in Short Hills, New Jersey. Pleasant Days was later renamed Greenwood Gardens by a subsequent owner and is open to the public. Pauline Day died in 1932 and Joseph P. Day remarried to Louisa Young Cole in 1942.

Day died at Flower Hospital in Manhattan on April 10, 1944.
