= The John Fairey Garden =

Coordinates: 30.05608°N 96.03824°W

The John Fairey Garden, formerly known as the Peckerwood Garden, is a forty-acre Garden Conservancy and ArbNet certified garden located in Waller County, Texas in the United States, founded by John G. Fairey. Over three thousand plants, many collected during the more than 100 expeditions to Mexico, many acquired through exchanges with botanical gardens and nurseries, exist in diverse naturalistic settings which is one of the hallmarks of John Fairey's landscape designs. Other design hallmarks include aesthetic use of pea gravel, steel hardscaping, a colonial blue stucco wall, stucco fountain wall, and art. The garden is home to over 60 species of oak, including rare species.

== Location ==
The garden is located south of Hempstead, Texas between Austin and Houston three miles south of Hwy 290 at 20559 FM 359 Rd. It is located at the confluence of three Texas geographic zones: the Gulf coast prairie region to the south, the pine and flatland woods to the east, and the Blackland prairie and post oak clay pan to the west and north.
