= Vitinho (Portuguese character) =

Portuguese mascot

Vitinho is a character created by Angola-born author José Maria Pimentel and used as a mascot for Milupa's Miluvit from the mid-1980s to 2004. Its success came in October 1986, when RTP ordered the creation of an animated short to air during the children's watershed, airing until 1997.

Currently, Pimentel is the sole owner of the character, as Milupa ceased all localized advertising activities, per an order issued by the German parent in 2004.

== History ==
The character was created in 1984 by José Maria Pimentel, at the initiative of advertiser Mariana Botelho Neves, with the launch of Milupa's product Miluvit, which was targeted at older children, in an attempt to increase the company's demographics. The character was thought up in at least ten minutes, with rural appearance, walking barefoot (inspired by his Angolan childhood and the Huckleberry Finn character by Mark Twain) and her newly born oldest daughter.

In 1986, RTP ordered an animated film to air during primetime, approved by director of programs Carlos Pinto Coelho and children's programming consultant Maria Alberta Menéres. The premiere happened in October of that year (for years, it was erroneously believed to be on February 2) airing after the evening telenovela and the newly introduced segment Uma História ao Fim do Dia, which aired at around 9pm. Pimentel was in charge of the scripts of the four films, as well as its animation.

The first and most remembered of the four was sung by Isabel Campelo. Vitinho's parents were voiced by Maria Helena d'Eça Leal and José Nuno Martins (which at the time was a director at RTP), while Vitinho himself (laughing and yawning) was voiced by Gonçalo Mendes Martins, son of Milupa's Portuguese administrator, João Mendes Martins. The success of the animation led to the release of merchandising, eclipsing the original purpose of the character. With this, Milupa opted to sell advertising rights to RTC, enabling special conditions for primetime advertising of its products.

Seeing that the first film was already wasted, a second song and animation were commissioned, with the new jingle sung by Dulce Neves. The animation included an anthropomorphic pillow, which gave the role of a mother to the character, eventually becoming a piece of merchandise of its own right, with an image of Vitinho and the pillow printed onto it.

In 1990, Vitinho became the mascot of the first two seasons of Arca de Noé, the Portuguese version of Waku Waku Animal Land, and appeared in the cover of the game show's disc, holding a photo of Carlos Alberto Moniz, its presenter. However, the timeslot occupied for the animated short was reserved to other characters in 1990–1991. Following this phase, work on the third film began, the first to be entirely produced in Portugal, as the previous two were animated in Spain. The accompanying song was sung by Eugénia Melo e Castro.

The fourth and last film, produced in 1992, was supposed to be accompanied by Cantiga d'Embalar, composed and sung by Paulo de Carvalho and Lena d'Água. However, RTC's administrator João David Nunes, rejected it, causing the animation to be reset in record time in order to accommodate a new original jingle by Paulo de Carvalho. The single also featured the rejected song as its B-side. Simultaneously, a second CD, Êxitos da Pequenada, was released by Sony Music's kids label, featuring songs from children's groups such as Popeline and Onda Choc, which were mostly covers of existing songs.

Before making each new film, interviews were conducted in primary schools, in which the previous Vitinho videos were shown and children mentioned which aspects of the routine they didn't like. This put weight in the second film, where the pillow was seen as a mother.

In its last few years on air, the fourth film left RTP1 and was only seen on RTP2, where it remained until 1997. Until the creation of Os Patinhos in 1998, there was no animated short to put children to bed.

In 2004, Milupa's German parent centralized all marketing activities, ending local communication efforts. This meant that Vitinho had to be withdrawn as its mascot. After that, José Maria Pimentel became its sole owner, subsequently launching O Grande Livro do Vitinho in 2017.

== Google Doodle ==
In early 2011, Pimentel received a call from Google Portugal to create its first fully-localized Google Doodle, which was put for February 2. In 2017, while Pimentel was doing research for O Grande Livro do Vitinho, he discovered that the animated short only made its first airing on October 16, 1986, which contradicted the information Google gave.

== Criticism ==
The first film almost took the character to the courts, because, although the film had no references to Milupa's cereals, both parties involved (it and RTP) were accused of hidden advertising by the National Consumer Defence Institute (DECO). A source of the institute later said that "Vitinho was safe because Portuguese justice delays". The idea was suggested by António Costa, who would soon become prime minister of Portugal from 2015 to 2024.

== In popular culture ==
On May 15, 2012, Canal Q released a parody known as Vitó, which aired at 10:30pm before its flagship program Inferno. The character was adjusted to the context of the financial crisis Portugal was facing at the time, at age 30, still living with his parents and facing life problems. The idea for the short film emerged in a dinner where Nuno Soares received word from Canal Q executives to create "a sort of Vitinho" which put the title character working precariously at a call center and criticizing work, post-university internships, transport strikes and the lack of money.
