= José Maria Pimentel =

Portuguese-Angolan writer and illustrator

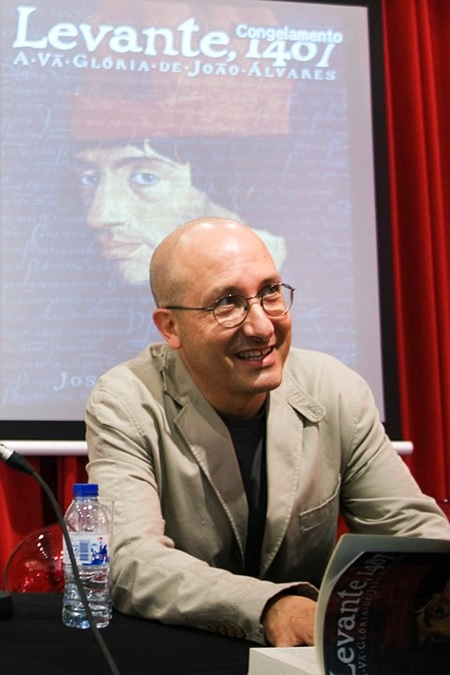
José Maria Pimentel, 2010

José Maria Pimentel (Luanda, 23 June 1956) is a Portuguese-Angolan writer and illustrator. He created the famous RTP1 character Vitinho.

== Works ==
- Levante 1487 – A Vã Glória de João Álvares, 2010
- O Grande Livro do Vitinho, 2017
- Vitinho– Um dia eu vou ser grande!, 2017
- Vitinho – É a dormir que se cresce!, 2017
- Vitinho – Perigo! Zona de Acidentes!, 2018
