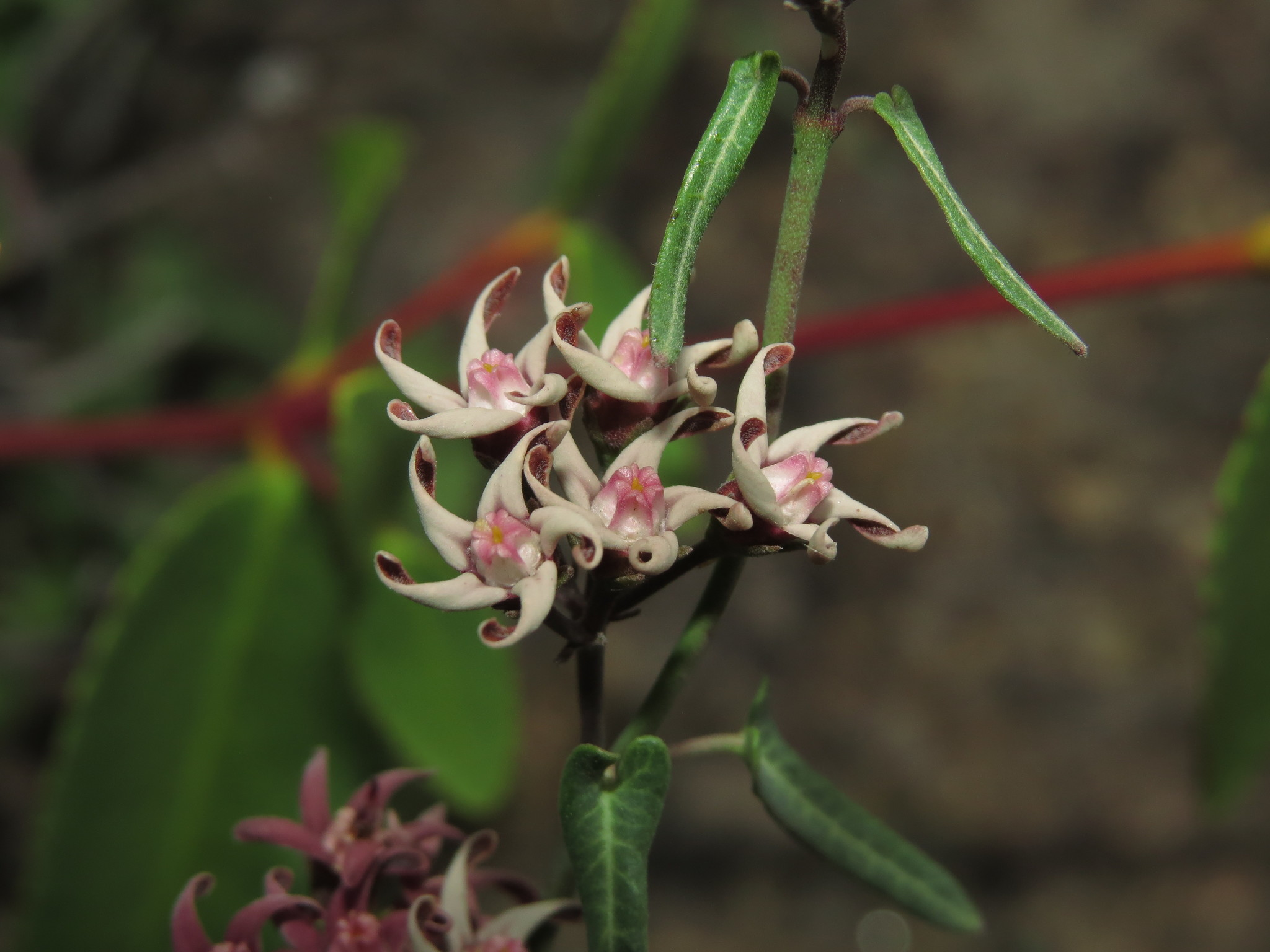
- Tweedia birostrata in Chile

Scientific classification
- Kingdom: Plantae
- Clade: Tracheophytes
- Clade: Angiosperms
- Clade: Eudicots
- Clade: Asterids
- Order: Gentianales
- Family: Apocynaceae
- Subfamily: Asclepiadoideae
- Tribe: Asclepiadeae
- Genus: Tweedia; Hook. & Arn.

Type species
- Tweedia birostrata (Hook. & Arn.) Hook. & Arn.

= Tweedia =

Genus of flowering plants

Tweedia is a genus of flowering plants in the family Apocynaceae, first described as a genus in 1835. The genus is native to South America. An ornamental plant, Oxypetalum coeruleum, formerly included in this genus is commonly referred to as "tweedia".

== Species ==
Current species include:

1. Tweedia andina (Phil.) G.H.Rua – Chile
2. Tweedia aucaensis G.H. Rua – Argentina
3. Tweedia australis (Malme) C. Ezcurra – Argentina
4. Tweedia birostrata (Hook. & Arn.) Hook. & Arn. – Chile
5. Tweedia brunonis Hook. & Arn. – Argentina, Bolivia, Paraguay
6. Tweedia echegarayi (Hieron.) Malme – Argentina
7. Tweedia solanoides (Hook. & Arn.) Chittenden – Argentina, Brazil, Paraguay, Uruguay

formerly included:

1. Tweedia coerulea, syn of Oxypetalum coeruleum
2. Tweedia floribunda, syn of Oxypetalum solanoides
3. Tweedia macrolepis, syn of Oxypetalum macrolepis
4. Tweedia versicolor, syn of Oxypetalum coeruleum
