= Os Patinhos =

Portuguese animated series

Os Patinhos is the name of an animated property created by Rui Cardoso of Animanostra in 1997; which became popular in 1998 after being adopted by RTP1 as an interstitial short played at the 9pm watershed (airing there until 2000; since then it aired on RTP2 until at least 2009). With the primetime success, the property gained a large amount of merchandise at the turn of the millennium.

The rights to the characters are currently held by animation studio Toonelada.

== History ==
The interstitial originated in 1997 when RTP ordered Animanostra animator Rui Cardoso and musician Paulo Curado an animation based on Todos os Patinhos, a Portuguese children's song, into an animation played on the pre-school educational program O Jardim da Celeste, which aired on RTP's channels. The animation featured a theatrical performance interpreted and watched by ducks, following the original version of the song and featuring three ducks wearing bathing suits. The animation caught the attention of RTP's children's director Teresa Paixão, who suggested the return of a bedtime slot for children on RTP1 to the channel's director of programming Maria Elisa. RTP had interstitials designed to put children in bed for roughly thirty years at the time, Vitinho being the most successful to date.

With this plan in mind, RTP ordered Animanostra a second version, which included adapted lyrics and visuals for the context, with the lyrics including key concepts of a child's bedtime routine: putting the pajamas, washing teeth, telling a story and turning off the light. The revised short aired for the first time in October 1998, and aired after Telejornal and Contra-Informação (at the time, it was among the most popular programs among children), at around 9:30pm. By April 1999, the animated short had an average audience of 14% and a share of 32%.

The success of the short caused RTP's commercial arm, RTC, to release CD and cassette versions of the song, released ahead of Christmas. This was followed by a larger wave of merchandise, which Animanostra's founder, Humberto Santana, was not aware of. RTP also refused to reveal exact revenue figures derived from its merchandise.

For the 1999/2000 Christmas and New Year season, seasonal versions were created, which Animanostra viewed as something not to tire from the usual version of the song, adding that "repetition is not a problem for children".

The success in Portugal caused RTC to put up the title for sale, promoting it to foreign buyers as Bedtime Singing Fluffy Ducklings. However, it faced problems: certain countries like Sweden imposed restrictions on children's advertising, making a segment like that impossible to air there; by November 1999, RTC was inking three contracts with companies in Spain and Turkey to release merchandise there.

During 1999, a substantial amount of bootleg merchandise involving the character was apprehended by the authorities.

== Criticism ==
The song received some criticism, including a verse about washing teeth, when, in reality, ducks don't have teeth. A father phoned RTP accusing the animation of delivering false information on animal anatomy. A scene near the end of the original animation, where the green xylophonist duck is taken away by a cane, was criticized for its violence, but Teresa Paixão believed that "it's a joke like any other".
