= Animanostra =

Portuguese animation studio

Animanostra is a Portuguese animation company founded in 1991 by Humberto Santana. The company mainly produces works for television and cinema, as well as co-productions with foreign firms.

== History ==
Humberto Santana founded the company in 1991 and its first work for television was A Maravilhosa Expedição às Ilhas Encantadas (Quest for the Enchanted Islands), a free adaptation of the Portuguese Age of Discoveries, in 1992. In 1998, the company released A Demanda do R, an all-animal animated series where an evil wizard removed the letter R from the alphabet, causing misunderstanding between its inhabitants; two friends enter the Land of Letters to recover it.

In 1997, it was tasked to produce an animation based on Todos os Patinhos, a Portuguese children's song, for O Jardim da Celeste, RTP's preschool education series. After catching the attention of Teresa Paixão, who recommended it to air in the 9pm children's watershed, the studio made a bedtime version of it, which started airing on RTP1 in October 1998, creating a new IP, Os Patinhos. Humberto Santana was not aware of the success of the animated short; within a few months, it had amassed a high amount of merchandising.

After a substantial growth in the 90s, delays in ICAM funds affected Portuguese animation studios, including Animanostra. The company had left ICAM in April and had no contract with them. In the previous year, at Cinanima, Santana criticized the fact that the animation industry lacked diversified funding sources which "ruined whatever globalization perspective" for its productions. In 2002, the company was in talks with Nuno Markl to produce an adult animated concept, PornoSilva, a Flash animated series about a suburban adult film production company.

In February 2024, the company, owing to its co-production of the theatrical film They Shot the Piano Player was nominated for a Cartoon Movie award for best animation studio.

== Filmography ==
- 1992: Quest for the Enchanted Islands (40x5, RTP)
- 1993: Poemas Pintados (13x2, RTP)
- 1993: Tóni Casquinha (2x30)
- 1993: Oscar (3x30)
- 1994: Elmer (2x1)
- 1994: Johnny With No Fear/João Sem Medo (five-minute pilot)
- 1995: Ginjas (three two-minute pilots)
- 1995: Para Bom Entendedor/For Good Understanding (one-minute pilot)
- 1996: O Jardim da Celeste (segments for season 1, RTP)
- 1997: A Família Barata/The Barata Family (four-minute pilot)
- 1997: O Jardim da Celeste (segments for season 2, RTP)
- 1997: The Missing R (13x13, RTP)
- 1998: Os Patinhos (six animated shorts for RTP)
- 2001: O que D(in)is Machado (30-minute documentary for RTP)
- 2002: A Estrela de Gaspar (26-minute special for RTP)
- 2002: Two Diaries and a Tile (animated short)
- 2002: Angelitos (120x1, RTP and TV Cultura)
- 2003: Ficções do Assombro (6x6)
- 2004: As Aventuras de Móli (13x4)
- 2004: Without Breathing (animated short)
- 2004: As Aventuras do Patinho (10x2, RTP)
- 2006: The Guilt (animated short)
- 2006: Stories from Molero (6x6)
- 2006: The Night Shift (8x5)
- 2006: Tomorrow, No Doubt (animated short)
- 2006: A Ilha das Cores (segments for season 1, RTP)
- 2006: Silence (animated short)
- 2006: Zé Pimpão, The Speedy (animated short)
- 2006: Woman (6x5'30")
- 2007: Januário and the War (animated short)
- 2008: Eu Quero Ser (26x4, RTP)
- 2008: Journal of a Record's Inspector (animated short)
- 2008: Birds (animated short)
- 2009: A Ilha das Cores (segments for season 2, RTP)
- 2009: A Step Could Be a World (animated short)
- 2009: Something Important (animated short)
- 2009: As Aventuras de Móli 3D (three-minute CGI pilot for an animated feature film)
- 2009: Overcome Fears (6x2)
- 2010: Foxy & Meg (26x3)
- 2010: Dog Memory (animated short)
- 2011: Fado of a Grown Man (animated short)
- 2011: Ginjas (26x1, RTP)
- 2011: My Music (animated short)
- 2011: Unintended (animated short)
- 2012: The Refugee (animated short)
- 2012: Fado in the Night (animated short)
- 2012: Cata Livros (23x1)
- 2013: Figurões (four-minute pilot)
- 2016: Garatujo/Doodle (animated short)
- 2016: The Countryside by the Sea (animated short)
- 2016: Final Call (animated short)
- 2017: Bird's Heart (five-minute TV special pilot)
- 2018: October 28 (animated short)
- 2018: Because This Is My Craft (animated short)
- 2018: Ratio Between Two Volumes (animated short)
- 2019: This Is Not a Hat (26-minute TV special)
- 2019: Tide (animated short)
- 2019: So But Not So (animated short)
- 2020: Table (animated short)
- 2021: The Doctor's Wife (animated short)
- 2022: Octopus (animated short)
- 2022: Something I Said (animated short)
- 2022: Kafka's Doll (animated short)
- 2023: A Bear Named Wojtek (28-minute special; animation services)
- 2023: Páscoa (animated short)
- 2023: They Shot the Piano Player (feature film)
- 2023: The Rock and the Wave (25x2; animated miniseries aired during the 50th anniversary of the Carnation Revolution)
- 2024: Ups! (animated short)
- 2024: Nwavu, the Blind Man (animated short)
- 2025: Silver Salts (animated short)
