= They Shot the Piano Player =

2023 animated film

- Promotional release poster
- Spanish: Dispararon al pianista
- Directed by: Fernando Trueba; Javier Mariscal
- Written by: Fernando Trueba
- Produced by: Cristina Huete; Serge Lalou; Sophie Cabon; Bruno Felix; Janneke Van Der Kerkhof; Femke Wolting; Humberto Santana
- Starring: Jeff Goldblum
- Edited by: Arnau Quiles
- Animation by: Carlos León Sancha
- Production companies: Fernando Trueba PC; Gao Shan Pictures; Les Films D’ici; Prima Linea; Submarine; Animanostra; Tondero Producciones
- Distributed by: BTeam Pictures (Spain); Dulac Distribution (France); Films4You (Portugal)
- Release dates: September 6, 2023 (Telluride); October 6, 2023 (Spain); March 21, 2024 (Portugal)
- Running time: 103 minutes
- Countries: Spain; France; Netherlands; Portugal; Peru
- Languages: Portuguese; English; Spanish
- Budget: €6,216,000
- Box office: €509,000

They Shot the Piano Player (Spanish: Dispararon al pianista) is a 2023 adult animated docudrama film directed by Fernando Trueba and Javier Mariscal. Centred around the real-life disappearance and murder of Brazilian bossa nova pianist Tenório Jr. in 1976, the film stars Jeff Goldblum as Jeff Harris, an American music journalist investigating Tenório's case.

The film's soundtrack includes music by João Gilberto, Caetano Veloso, Gilberto Gil, Vinicius de Moraes and Paulo Moura, with some of the musicians also appearing in the voice cast as themselves testifying about Tenório's importance and influence as part of Goldblum's character investigation.

The film had its world premiere at the 50th Telluride Film Festival on 6 September 2023, and was released theatrically in Spain on 6 October 2023.

== Plot ==
Bossa Nova's origin story, deeply changed by the numerous military coups in Latin America, especially those in Argentina and Brazil, is portrayed through non-fiction interviews with Brazilian Popular Music singers, songwriters and music critics.

The film follows Jeff Harris, a New York City music journalist, traveling to Rio de Janeiro hoping to find answers on the mysterious disappearance of Brazilian pianist Tenório Jr. and his influence in Bossa Nova.

== Cast ==
- Jeff Goldblum as Jeff Harris
- Tony Ramos as João
- Abel Ayala as Claudio Vellejos
- Roberta Wallach as Jessica
- Ângela Rabello as Suzana de Moraes
- Stephen Hughes as John Rowles
- Alejandra Flechner as Dõna Haydee
- Vinicius de Moraes as himself (archive footage)
- Malena Barretto as herself
- Raymundo Bittencourt as himself
- Alberico Campana as himself
- Umberto Contardi as himself
- Chico Buarque as himself
- João Donato as himself
- João Gilberto as himself (archive footage)
- Edu Lobo as himself
- Gilberto Gil as himself
- Milton Nascimento as himself
- Toquinho as himself
- Caetano Veloso as himself

== Distribution ==
An excerpt screened as work in progress at the 2023 Annecy International Animation Film Festival, before having its official world premiere at the 50th Telluride Film Festival.

It also screened at various film festivals, including Toronto, Cinéfest Sudbury, Vancouver, San Sebastián, Calgary and BFI London, before its commercial premiere in October.

In May 2023, Sony Pictures Classics acquired distribution rights to the film for the United States, Canada, Latin America, Scandinavia, India, the Middle East, Turkey, Southeast Asia (excluding Taiwan and South Korea) and airlines within the aforementioned territories. The film was released in a limited one-week awards-qualifying run in select theaters in New York and Los Angeles from November 24 to 30, 2023, with a wider release in February 2024.

In Portugal, the film was distributed by Films4You and premiered in theaters on March 21, 2024.

In Japan, the film was co-distributed by Gonzo and 2Metertainmment and premiered in theaters on April 11, 2025.

== Reception ==
=== Critical response ===
On the review aggregator website Rotten Tomatoes, 74% of 35 critics' reviews are positive, with an average rating of 6.4/10. The website's consensus reads: "They Shot the Piano Player presents a moving look at a fascinating true story, although its aesthetic inventiveness isn't matched by its narrative approach." Metacritic, which uses a weighted average, assigned the film a score of 73 out of 100, based on 11 critics, indicating "generally favorable" reviews.

=== Top ten lists ===
The film appeared on a critics' top ten list of the best Spanish films of 2023:

- 8th — El Confidencial (consensus)

=== Accolades ===
Year	Award	Category	Nominee(s)	Result	Ref.
2023	29th Forqué Awards	Best Animation Film		Nominated	
2024	16th Gaudí Awards	Best Animated Film		Nominated	
2024	38th Goya Awards	Best Animated Film		Nominated	
2024	11th Platino Awards	Best Animated Film		Nominated	
