= Geraes =

Studio album by Milton Nascimento
- Released: December 1976
- Recorded: 1976
- Genre: MPB
- Length: 45:55 (original); 54:00 (1994 reissue)
- Label: EMI
- Producer: Ronaldo Bastos

Milton Nascimento chronology
Minas (1975)	Geraes (1976)	Milton (1977)

Professional ratings
Review scores
Source	Rating
AllMusic	4.5/5 stars
80 Minutos	5/5 stars

Geraes is the eighth studio album by Brazilian singer, guitarist, and composer Milton Nascimento. The album played a strong role in connecting Nascimento's music with the American public; at the time he was already known worldwide. It features Mercedes Sosa in "Volver A Los 17", Chico Buarque in "O Que Será (À Flor da Pele)", Clementina de Jesus in "Circo Marimbondo", and the Chileans from Grupo Agua, discovered by Milton, in the tracks "Caldera", "Promessas do Sol", and "Minas Geraes", the closing track. The album cover, by Cafi, shows the same drawing of the Três Pontas Mountains and train shown in the insert of Nascimento's previous album Minas (1975) that now stands out in the Geraes cover and vinyl insert with envelope paper. The album's 1994 CD reissue features two tracks from a compact disc Milton made with Chico Buarque in 1977 for the Philips label: "Primeiro de Maio" and "Cio da Terra", which was re-recorded by Pena Branca & Xavantinho, Sérgio Reis and Mercedes Sosa herself.

== Track listing ==
Geraes
No.	Title	Writer(s)	Featuring	Length
1.	"Fazenda"	Nelson Angelo		2:40
2.	"Calix Bento"	Tavinho Moura		3:30
3.	"Volver a los 17"	Violeta Parra	Mercedes Sosa	5:10
4.	"Menino"	Milton Nascimento, Ronaldo Bastos		2:47
5.	"O Que Será (À Flor da Pele)"	Chico Buarque	Chico Buarque	4:10
6.	"Carro de Boi"	Maurício Tapajós, Cacaso		3:40
7.	"Caldera (instrumental)"	Nelson Araya	Grupo Agua	4:25
8.	"Promessas do Sol"	Milton Nascimento, Fernando Brant	Grupo Agua	5:00
9.	"Viver de Amor"	Toninho Horta e Ronaldo Bastos		2:34
10.	"A Lua Girou"	Milton Nascimento		3:42
11.	"Circo Marimbondo"	Milton Nascimento, Ronaldo Bastos	Clementina de Jesus	2:55
12.	"Minas Geraes"	Novelli, Ronaldo Bastos	Grupo Agua	5:13

Bonus tracks from the 1994 CD reissue, featuring two tracks from the 6069 185 compact called "Chico & Milton" from 1977
No.	Title	Writer(s)	Length
13.	"Primeiro de Maio"	Chico Buarque, Milton Nascimento	4:49
14.	"O Cio da Terra"	Chico Buarque, Milton Nascimento	3:55

== Musicians ==
- Accordion: Dominguinhos;
- Afochê: Georgiana de Moraes;
- Agogô: Chico Batera;
- Basson: Noel Devos;
- Cello: Alceu de Almeida Reis, Giorgio Bariolla, Jorge Kundert Ranevsky (Iura), Márcio Eymard Mallard, Peter Dauelsberg, Watson Clis;
- Charango: Polo Cabrera;
- Cor anglais: Braz Limongi;
- Choir: Bebel Gilberto, Beto Guedes, Chico Buarque, Fernando Lepoarce, Francis Hime, Lizzie Bravo, Milton Nascimento, Miúcha, Nelson Angelo, Novelli, Piii, Tavinho Moura, Toninho Horta, Totó;
- Cuíca: Marçal;
- Drums: Robertinho Silva, Edison Machado;
- Electric and acoustic bass: Novelli, Luiz Alves, Renato Sbragia;
- Electric Guitar: Toninho Horta, Nelson Angelo;
- Flute: Celso Woltzenlogel, Danilo Caymmi, Mauro Senise, Paulo Guimarães, Paulo Jobim, Raul Mascarenhas, Nano Stuven
- Guitars: Luiz Gonsalez Carpena (Lucho), Milton Nascimento, Nelson Angelo, Nelson Araya, Oscar Pérez, Tavinho Moura;
- Maestro: Francis Hime;
- Percussion: Chico Batera, Luiz Alves, Toninho Horta, Robertinho Silva;
- Piano: Milton Nascimento, Francis Hime, Novelli, Toninho Horta
- Organ: João Donato, Toninho Horta;
- Repique: Doutor;
- Surdo: Robertinho Silva;
- Tamborim: Elizeu, Lima;
- Trumpet: Formiga (José Pinto);
- Viola: Arlindo Figueiredo Penteado, Murilo Loures, Nelson de Macedo;
- Viola caipira: Nelson Angelo;
- Violin: Aizik Meilach Geller, Alfredo Vidal, André Charles Guetta, Andréa Bueno Salinas, Francisco Perrota, Gentil Dias, Giancarlo Pareschi, João Daltro de Almeida, Jorge Faini, José Alves da Silva, José Dias de Lana, Nathercia Teixeira da Silva, Paschoal Perrota, Ricardo Wagner, Salvador Piersanti, Walter Hack, Wilson Teodoro;

== Personnel ==
- Artistic director: Milton Miranda;
- Agent: Paulo Pilla;
- Backstage: Ivanzinho;
- Base arrangements: Milton Nascimento and friends;
- Coffee breaks: Nonato;
- Cover: Cafi, Noguchi, Ronaldo Bastos;
- Cutting: Osmar Furtado;
- Design: Milton Nascimento;
- Editing: Landimar;
- Musical Supervision: Milton Nascimento;
- Production coordinator: Mariozinho Rocha;
- Producer: Ronaldo Bastos;
- Production assistant: Toninho Vicente;
- Photo: Cafi;
- Recordings: Roberto e Darcy;
- Remix: Nivaldo Duarte;
