= Canastra Mountains =

Range of hills in Minas Gerais, Brazil

Coordinates: 20°20′58″S 46°38′18″W

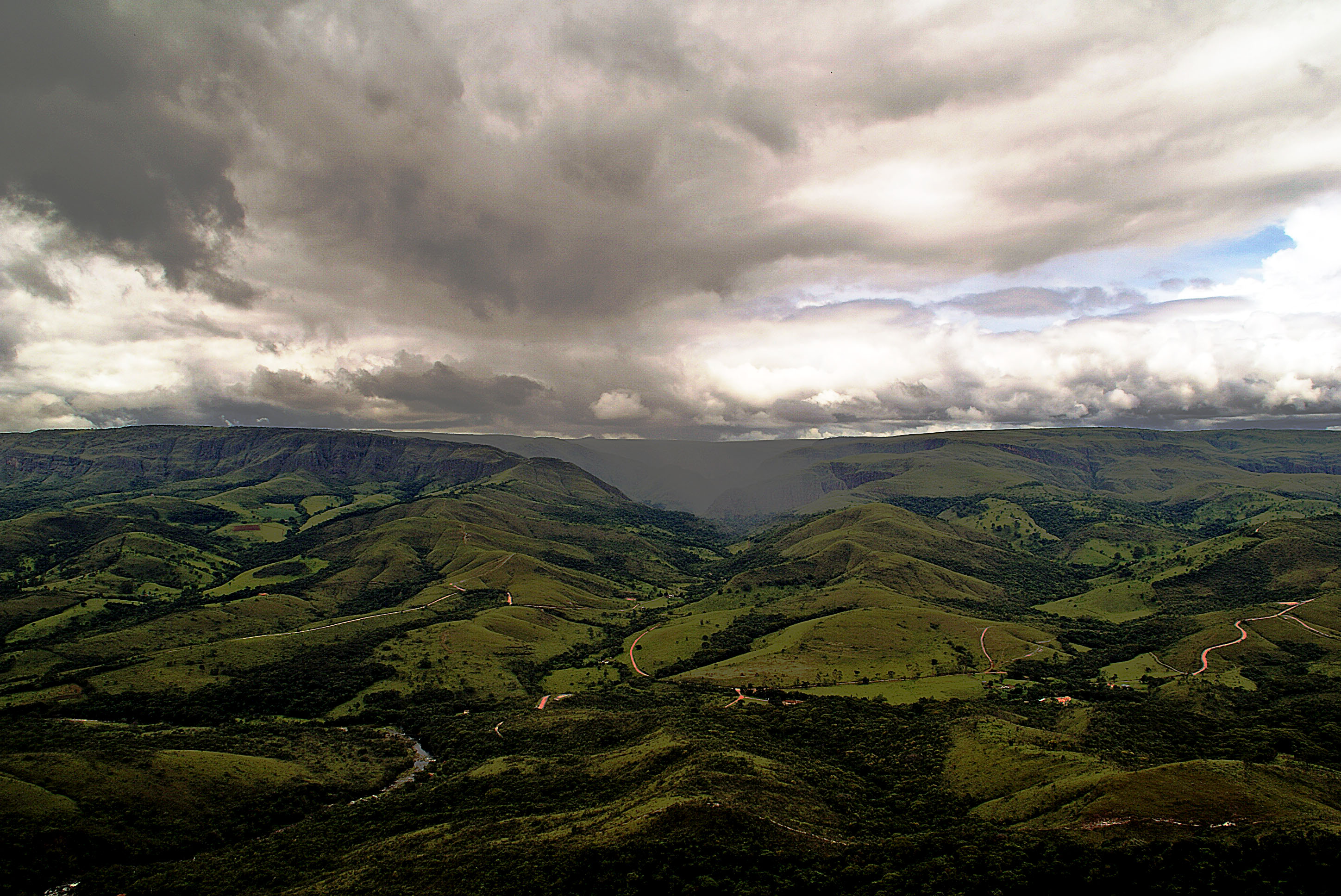

Naming
- Native name: Serra da Canastra (Portuguese)

Geography
- Location within Brazil
- Country: Brazil
- State: Minas Gerais

The Canastra Mountains (Serra da Canastra) are a range of hills in the Minas Gerais state of southeastern Brazil. The headwaters of the São Francisco River begin at this range and it is the location of the Serra da Canastra National Park and the Casca d'Anta waterfall. The altitude ranges from 900 m to 1,496 m. Kimberlite sites in this range have proven to be a rich source of diamonds.

The São Francisco River also is the 4th longest river in South America, passing through tons of states like Pernambuco, Bahia, etc..

The river ends at the coasts of states Alagoas and Sergipe.

== See also ==
- Três Pontas Mountains
