= Francis Cabot =

American horticulturist (1925–2011)

Francis Cabot CM CQ
- Born: Francis Higginson Cabot Jr. August 6, 1925; New York, New York, U.S.
- Died: November 19, 2011 (age 86); La Malbaie, Quebec, Canada
- Education: Harvard College (1949)
- Occupations: Financier and gardener
- Known for: The Garden Conservancy
- Notable work: Stonecrop Gardens
- Spouse: Anne Perkins (m. 1949)
- Children: Currie Cabot Barron; Marianne Cabot Welch; Colin Cabot
- Parent(s): Francis Higginson Cabot Sr. Currie D. Mathews

Francis Higginson Cabot, CM CQ (August 6, 1925 – November 19, 2011) was an American financier, gardener and horticulturist. He founded The Garden Conservancy in 1989.

== Early life ==
He was a member of the New York branch of the prominent Cabot family. After WWII service in the United States Army (when he saw Japanese gardens for the first time), Cabot graduated in 1949 from Harvard College, where he was active in Hasty Pudding Theatricals and was one of the four founders of the a cappella singing group, the Harvard Krokodiloes.

== Career ==
After college, he began constructing a garden on private property in Cold Spring, New York, above the Hudson River, beginning a lifelong passion for horticulture. Cabot was appointed chairman of the New York Botanical Garden in the Bronx from 1973 to 1976.

In 1989, he founded the nonprofit Garden Conservancy, after noting that two-thirds of America's great gardens had been destroyed by development. The Conservancy began with "four acres of giant cactuses, succulents and native species" in Walnut Creek, California, the life's work of gardener Ruth Bancroft. The organization's Open Days program has opened more than three hundred private gardens to the public throughout the United States and has been active in the preservation of seventeen important private gardens for posterity, including the rehabilitation of the gardens at Alcatraz.

Cabot became renowned for his personal gardens around the world. His garden in Cold Spring, known as Stonecrop Gardens, was opened to the public in 1992 and is now one of the premier public gardens in the United States, encompassing sixty-three acres. Its components were influenced and improved in the 1980s by horticulturist Caroline Burgess, who became the garden's director, having previously worked with legendary English gardener Rosemary Verey.

Cabot's private garden in the Charlevoix region of Quebec covers more than 20 acres (81,000 m^{2}) and is called Les Quatre Vents. He is credited with introducing a number of plants and grasses to North America, including Japanese blood grass. Les Quatre Vents has thematics fields like "Le lac Libellule", "le Pavillon japonnais de méditation", "le Pigeonnier", "le pont chinois de lune", "le kiosque à musique", "le potager" and more.

In 2001, he wrote the book The Greater Perfection: The Story of the Gardens at Les Quatre Vents, which was the recipient of the 2003 Annual Literature Award of the Council on Botanical and Horticultural Libraries and which the Oxford Companion to Gardens referred to as "one of the best books ever written about the making of a garden by its creator."

Cabot was also very involved in the preservation of old mills. Heritage Charlevoix, his foundation, bought "Le Moulin La Rémi" in Baie-Saint-Paul, also in Charlevoix. He invested money to rebuild this building.

== Personal life ==
In 1949, Cabot married Anne Perkins. They had three children: Colin Cabot, Currie Cabot, and Marianne Cabot. Their Stonecrop Gardens became a public garden in 1992.

In 2000, Cabot was made a Chevalier of the National Order of Quebec. He was awarded the Veitch Memorial Medal of the Royal Horticultural Society in 2002. In 2005, he was made an honorary Member of the Order of Canada. Winterthur Museum, Garden and Library awarded him the Henry Francis du Pont Award in 2003.

Shortly before his death, Cabot was interviewed at length for the documentary film The Gardener by Sebastien Chabot (2016), explaining his philosophy of gardens and the history of his own garden. Cabot died of idiopathic pulmonary fibrosis at his summer home in La Malbaie, Quebec, on November 19, 2011. He was 86.
