= Oxypetalum dactylostelma =

Scientific classification
- Kingdom: Plantae
- Clade: Tracheophytes
- Clade: Angiosperms
- Clade: Eudicots
- Clade: Asterids
- Order: Gentianales
- Family: Apocynaceae
- Genus: Oxypetalum
- Species: O. dactylostelma

Binomial name
- Oxypetalum dactylostelma Goyder

Synonyms
- Dactylostelma boliviense Schltr.

Species of plant

Oxypetalum dactylostelma is a species of flowering plant in the family Apocynaceae, native to Bolivia. It was first described in 1895 as Dactylostelma boliviense and transferred to Oxypetalum in 2004.
