= Três Pontas Mountains =

Mountain range located in Minas Gerais, Brazil

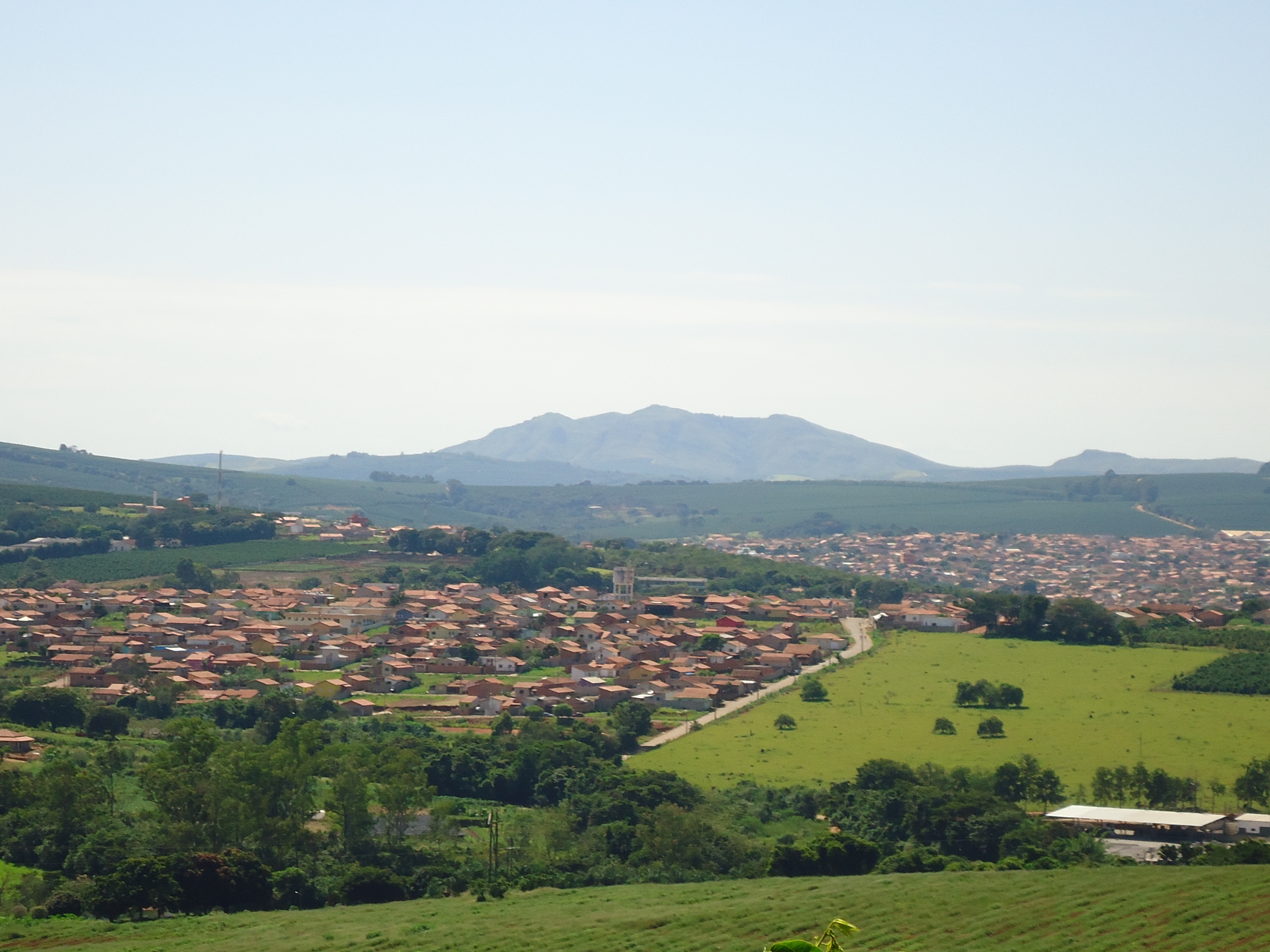
- View of the Três Pontas Mountains

Highest point
- Elevation: 1,234 m (4,049 ft)
- Coordinates: 21°23′37″S 45°23′21″W

Naming
- Native name: Serra de Três Pontas (Portuguese)

Geography
- Location within Brazil

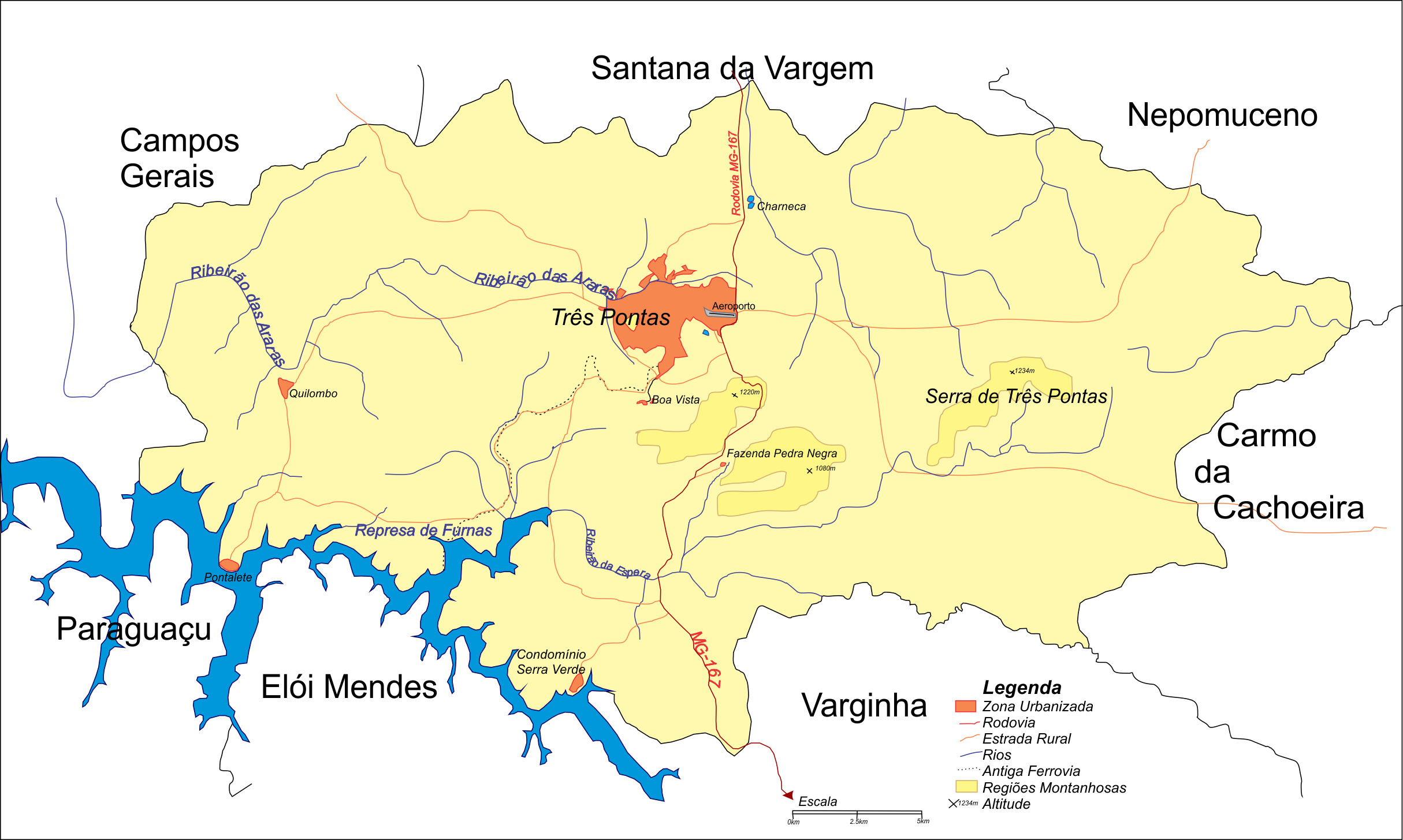
- Country: Brazil
- State: Minas Gerais
- Region: Southeast

Geology
- Rock age: Precambrian
- Mountain type: Mountain range

The Três Pontas Mountains is a geological formation located in the Brazilian municipality of Três Pontas, in the southern region of Minas Gerais. Its altitude, which reaches a maximum of 1,234 metres (4,049 ft) above sea level, stands out in relation to the surrounding terrain, with altitudes varying around 900 metres (3,000 ft). Although it seems like an isolated mountain system, the mountain range is considered an extension of the Bocaina Mountains, located about 38 kilometres (24 mi) away in the municipality of Lavras, which, in turn, is considered a counterfort of the Mantiqueira Mountains.

It is basically a rocky massif formed mainly by quartzite and covered with a thin layer of soil resulting from the disintegration of the rocks. The altitude, climate, and rocky composition of the mountain range provide for the formation of peculiar herbaceous structures, characteristic of high-altitude regions. Covered by altitude fields and rupestrian fields, the plant species are quite differentiated from the regions around the mountain. In addition, in the drainage furrows there are forest formations.

Since the beginning of the settlement of the region, around the 18th century, the mountain range was used as a reference point for travelers and muleteers. Slaves also used it as a refuge, building a quilombo (the Cascalho Quilombo) in its vicinity, but it was destroyed shortly thereafter. Its peculiar shape gave birth to the city of Três Pontas and has always been part of the culture of the municipality, being present in municipal symbols and in its cultural productions.

== Geological structure ==
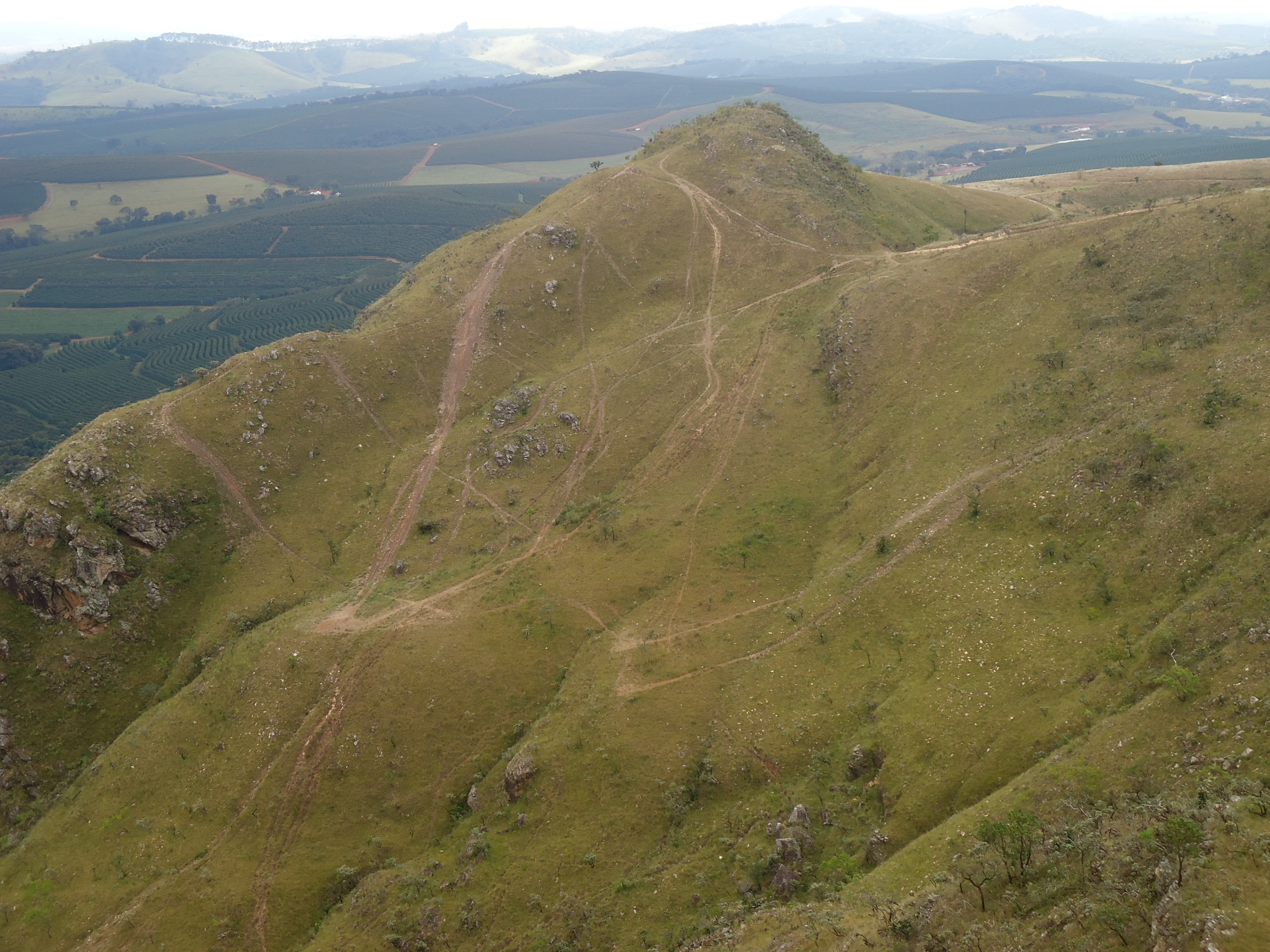
Detail of the mountain, showing some rocky outcroppings

The mountain range originated during the Precambrian period and is basically formed by metaquartzite in association with sericite-schist. The quartzite rocks are quite resistant to weathering, and that is why there is only a thin layer of gravel and sand covering the mountain, resulting from the disaggregation and subsequent fragmentation of the rock components, which form the Leptosol soil, of small thickness, stony, dry and with low fertility. In the vicinity of the mountain there are also yellow-red Acrisols, haplic Cambisol and litholic Neosol.

== Vegetation ==
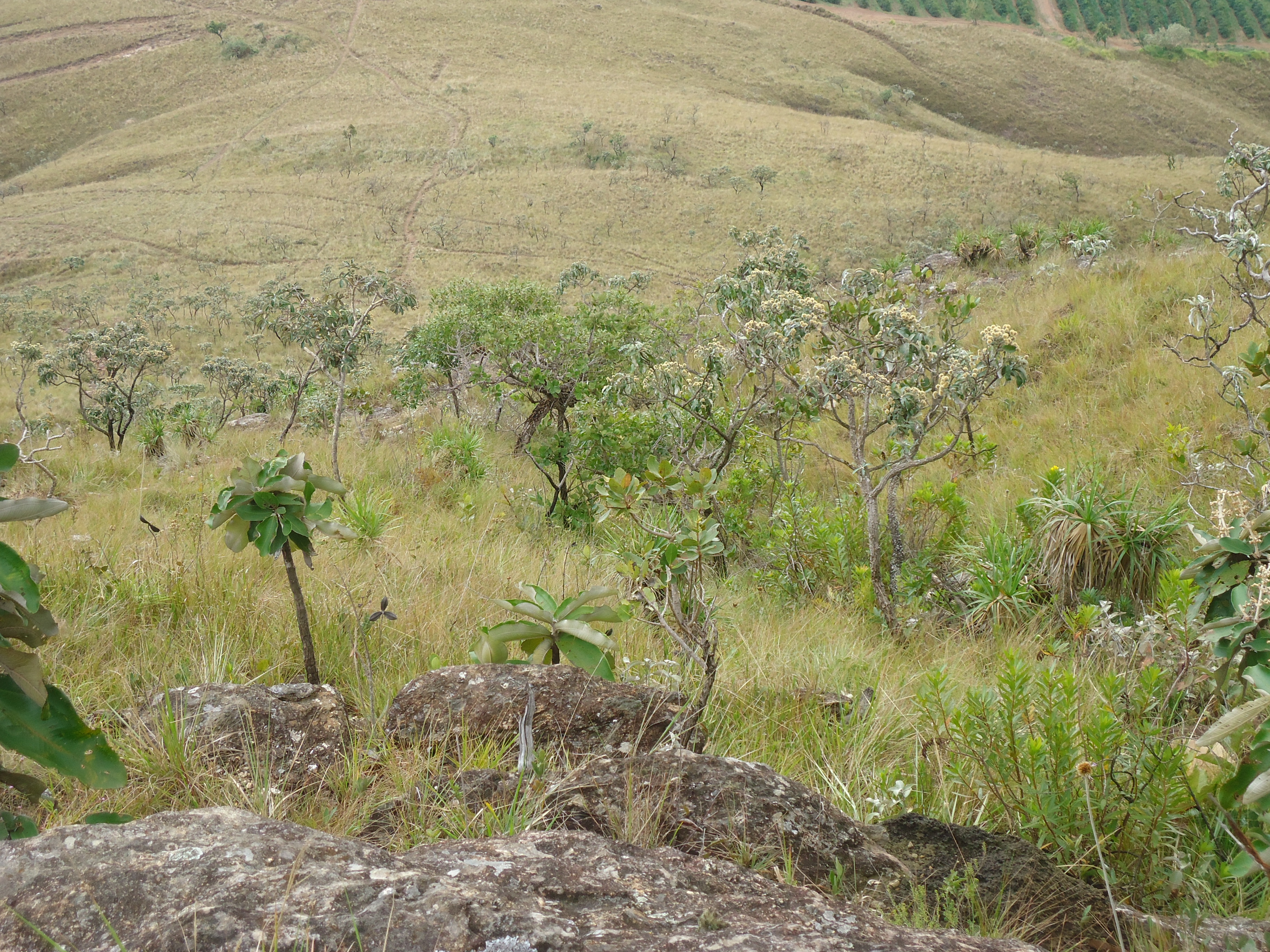
Vegetation of the Três Pontas Mountains

The altitude, location and mild climate (type Cwb of the Köppen-Geiger climate classification) allow for the existence of peculiar vegetation in the Três Pontas Mountains. Lithophyte formations are found on the rock walls, characterized by plants that grow directly on the rocks, formed by representatives of the groups of Velloziaceae, Bromeliaceae, Orchidaceae, pteridophytes, mosses and lichens.

In areas of flattened topography in the mountains there are vegetation formations that characterize the altitude fields and, in the steepest regions, there are the rupestrian fields. These formations are characterized by the presence of a stratum consisting of low grasses, with thin and tough leaves, in addition to the presence of plants of the Cyperaceae and Eriocaulaceae families. In areas with quartzite outcroppings there are also colonies of Velloziaceae, Asteraceae, Malpighiaceae, Vochysiaceae, and Cactaceae. The first family (Velloziaceae) are the most notable in the area, especially on its south-southeast slope. During a certain season the plants produce purplish, red, yellow, or white flowers. Among other genera and species of plants that stand out in the highlands for the beauty and peculiarity of their flowers are Paepalanthus and Syngonanthus. The altitude fields are part of the Atlantic Forest, while the rupestrian fields belong to the Cerrado. The mountains therefore characterize a transition zone between these two biomes.

In the furrows that make up the drainage network of the mountain system there is a frequent occurrence of forest formations. In these narrow strips are found several native species such as perobas, aroeiras (Astronium fraxinifolium and Lithraea molleoides) ipês, quaresmeiras and jacaranda trees.

== Historical and cultural importance ==
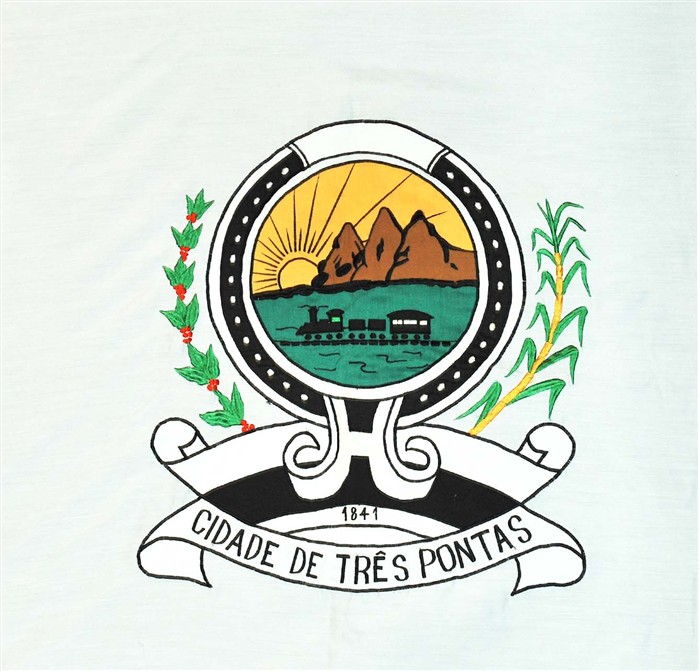
Flag of Três Pontas, with the representation of the mountain

During the first half of the 13th century, the region was little known. The first travelers and muleteers passing through the region used the peculiarly shaped mountain as a reference point during their expeditions. Runaway slaves also passed through the area.

In 1746, a sort of large quilombola confederation spread over a large area, including the municipality of Três Pontas, and its central point was the Ambrósio Quilombo, near Cristais. With its destruction, the runaway slaves spread throughout the region, and some of them headed for the hills, where they formed the Cascalho Quilombo, which was probably extinguished between 1743 and 1746. However, stone walls possibly built by the slaves during their stay in the region exist in the hills.

The mountain range, due to its peculiar shape, gave its name to the municipality of which it is a part and is considered one of the main characteristics of Três Pontas. In its coat of arms, created in 1930, the "Maria Fumaça" train, the rising sun, and the Três Pontas mountain range are highlighted. Years later, in 1976, the singer Milton Nascimento released his album Geraes, which carried on its cover a drawing extolling the mountain and which later came to be used as a symbol of the city.

== Gallery ==
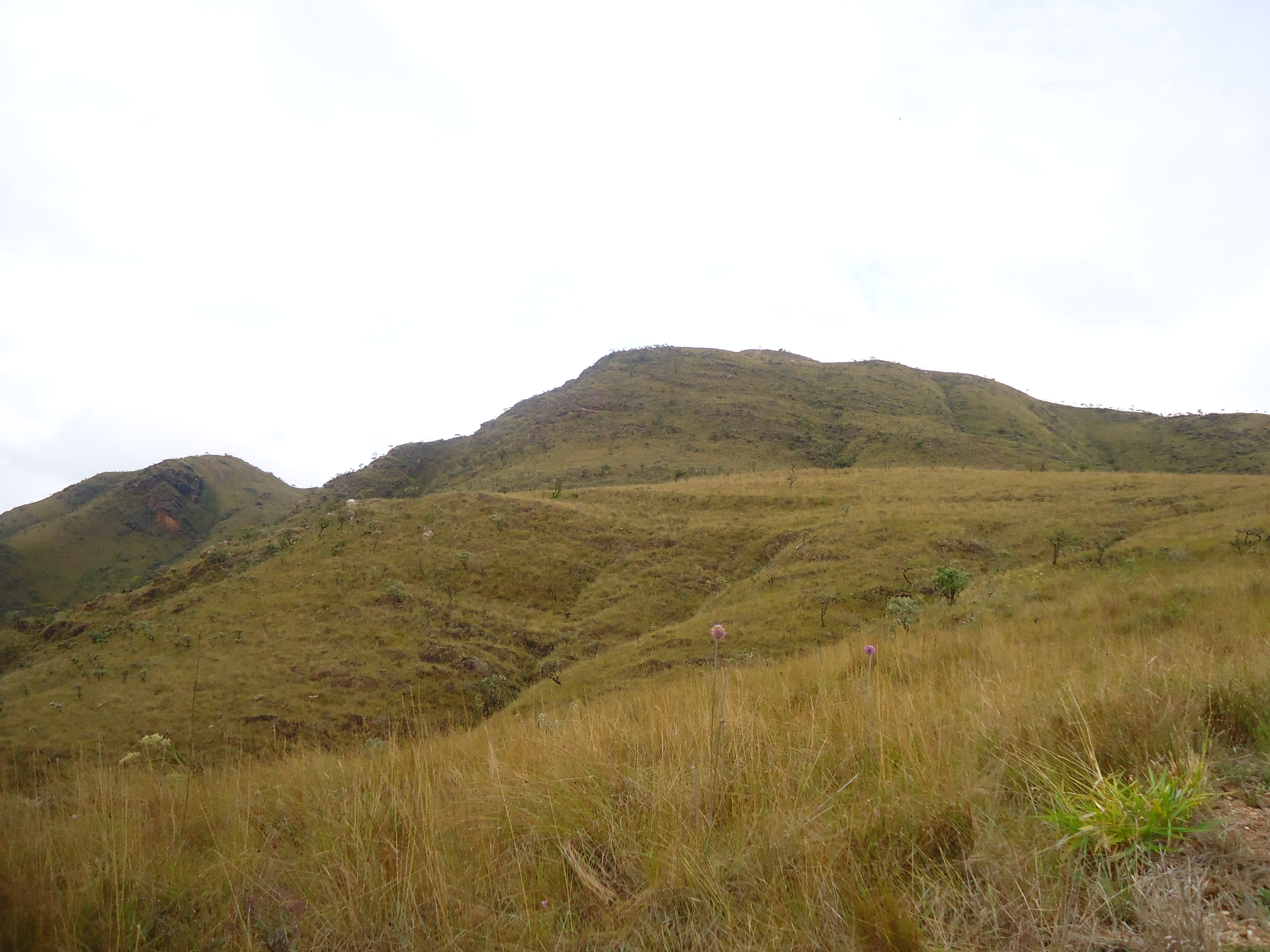
View of the lower part of the mountain

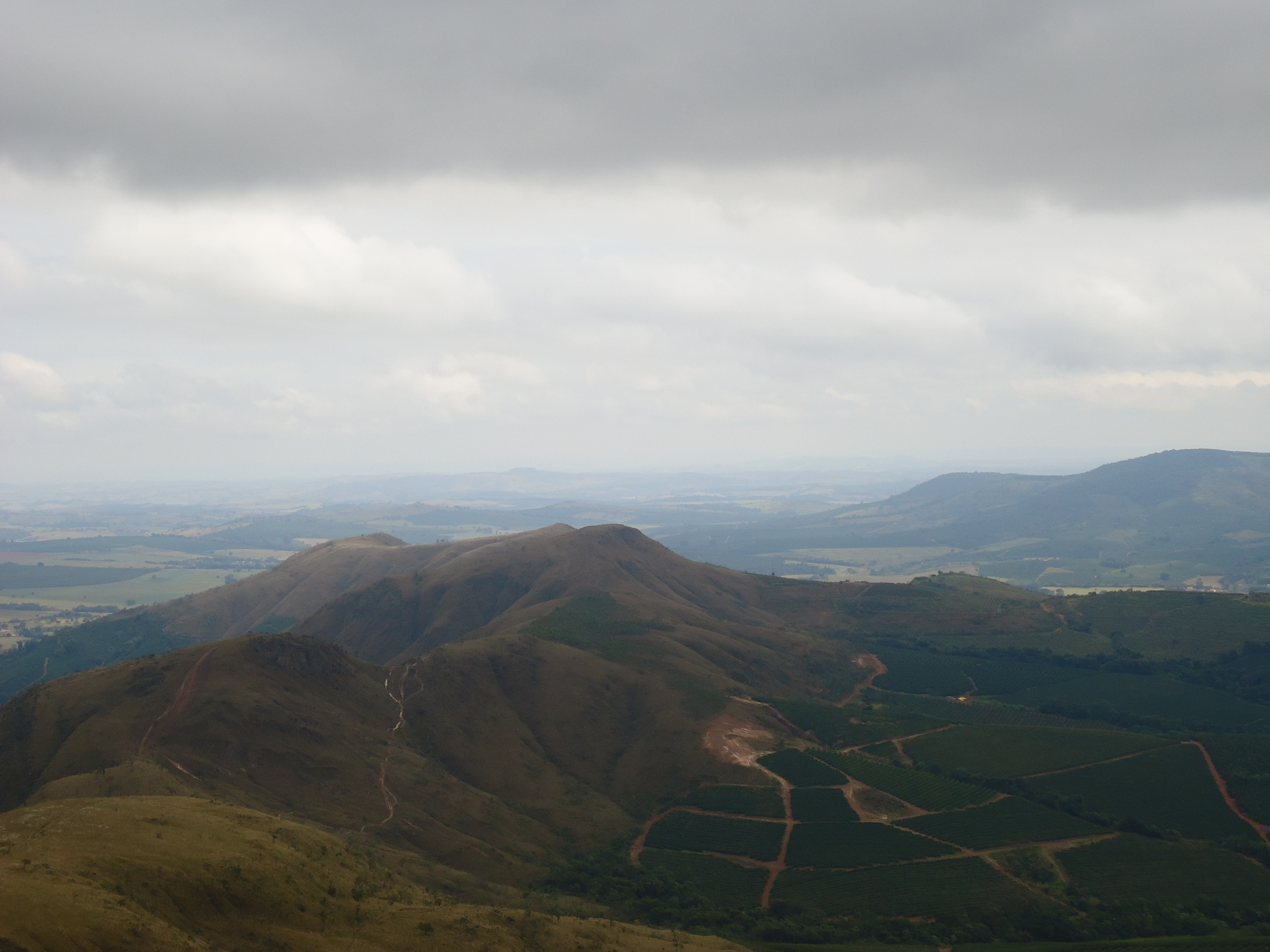
View of the range from its highest point

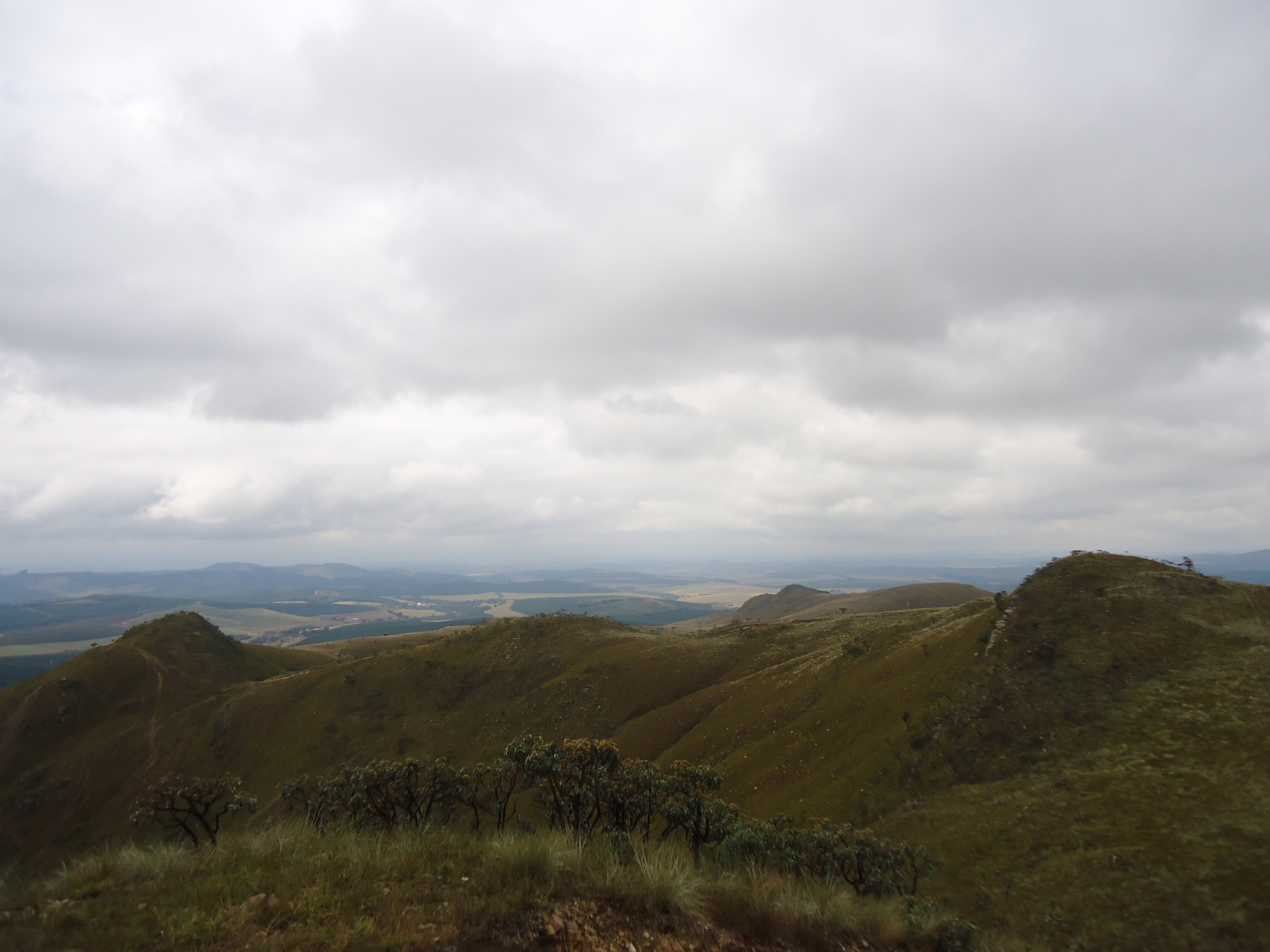
Partial view of the mountain

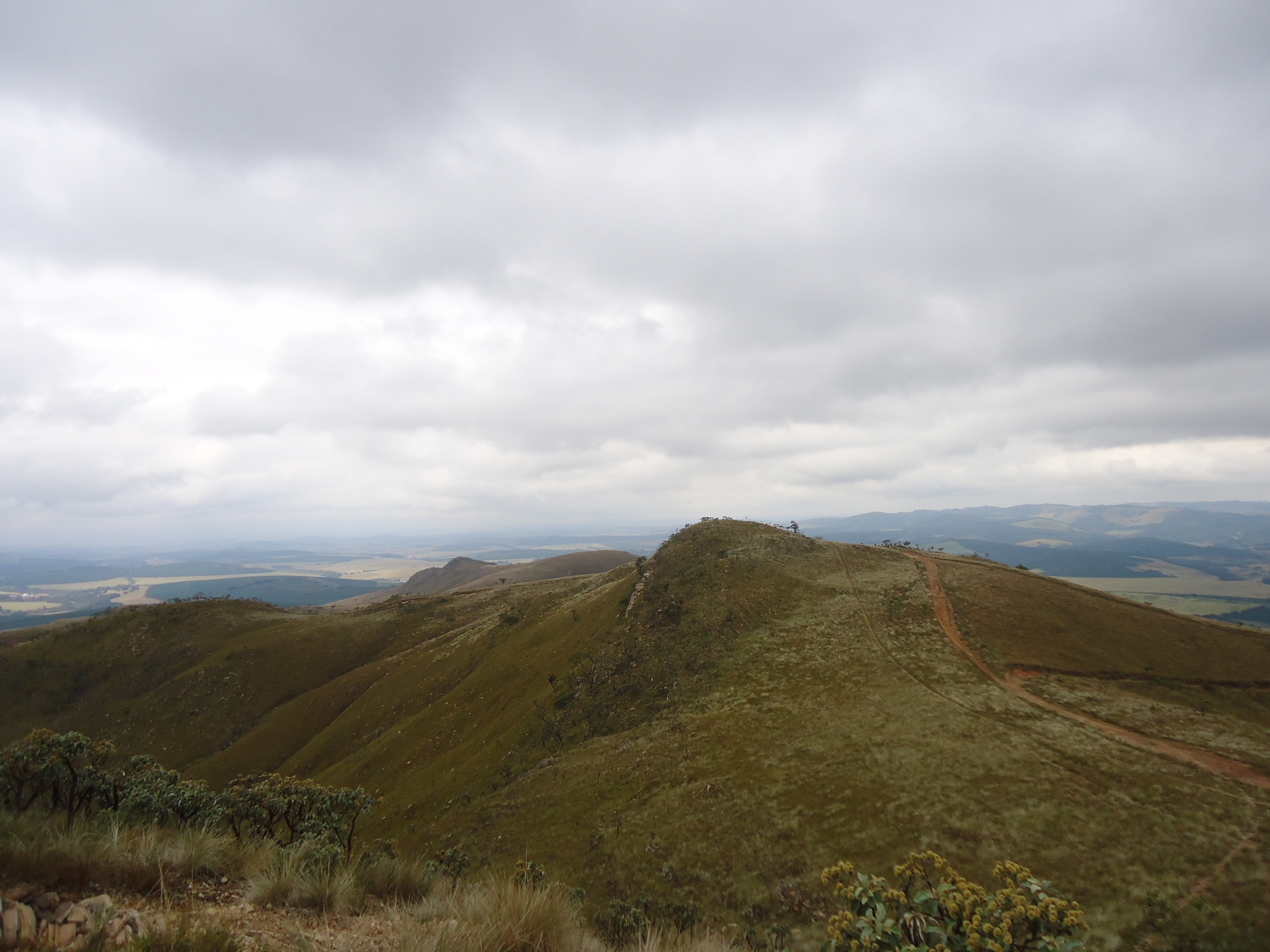
Partial view of the mountain

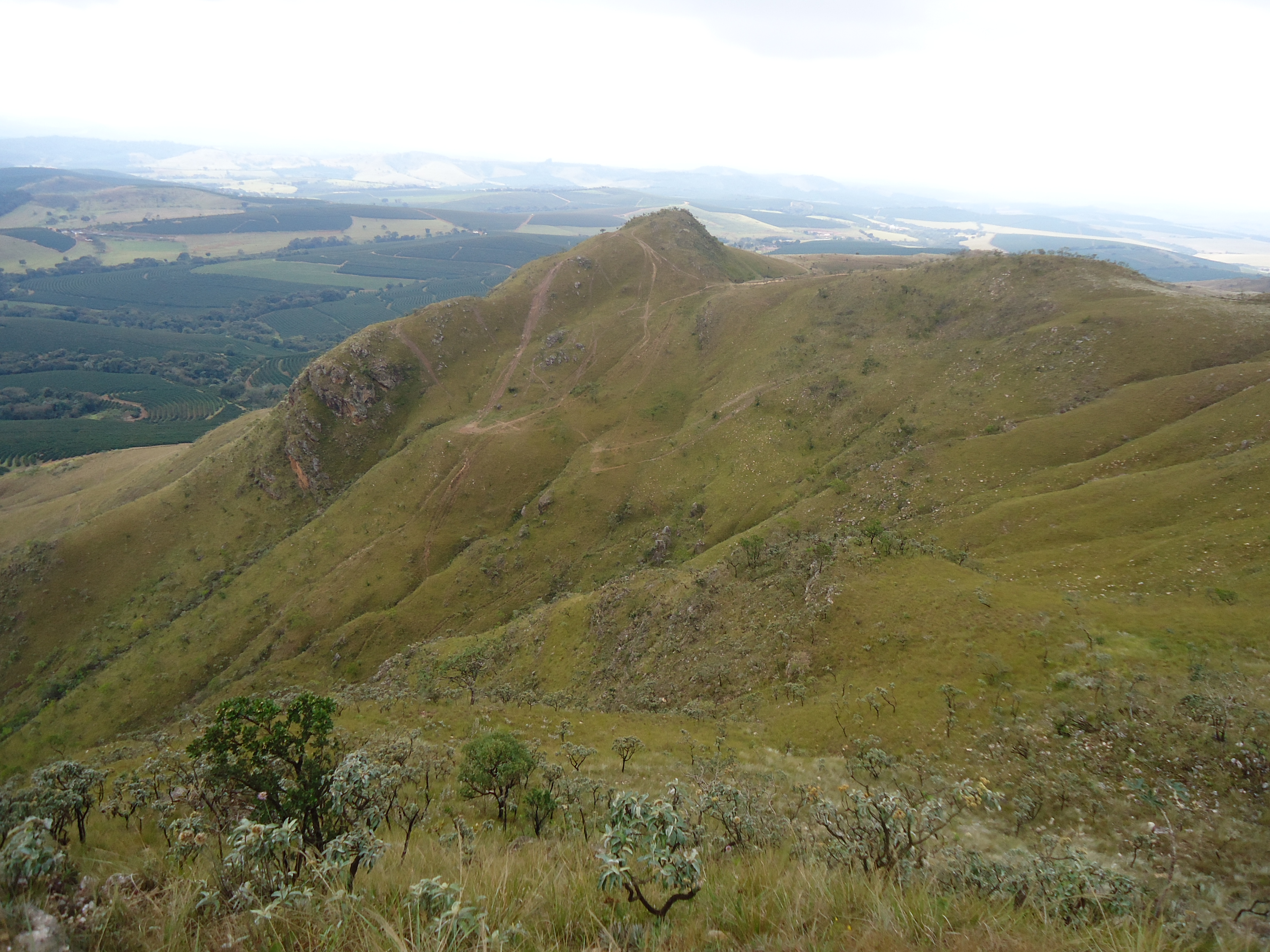
Partial view of the mountain

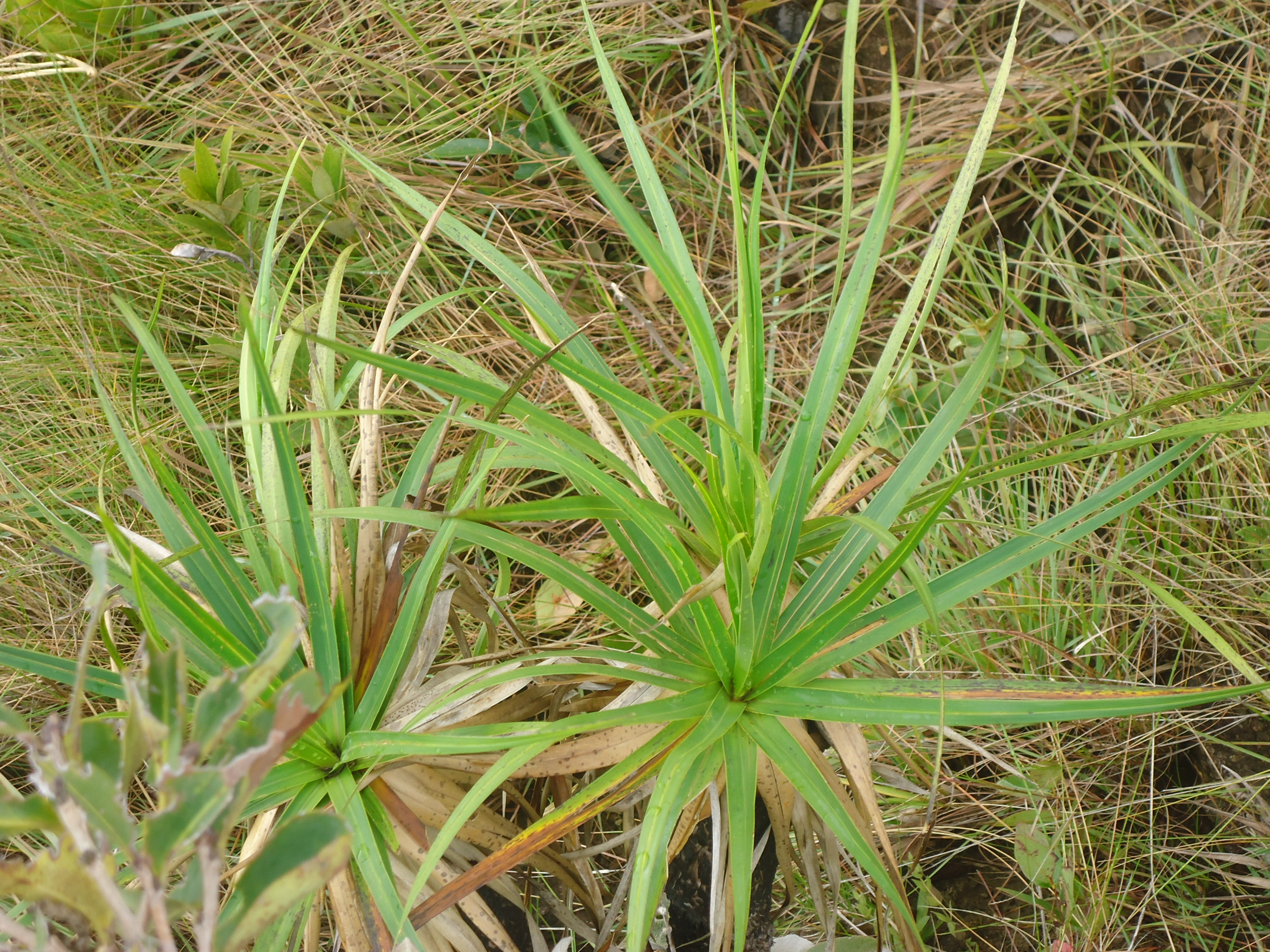
Plants in the mountains

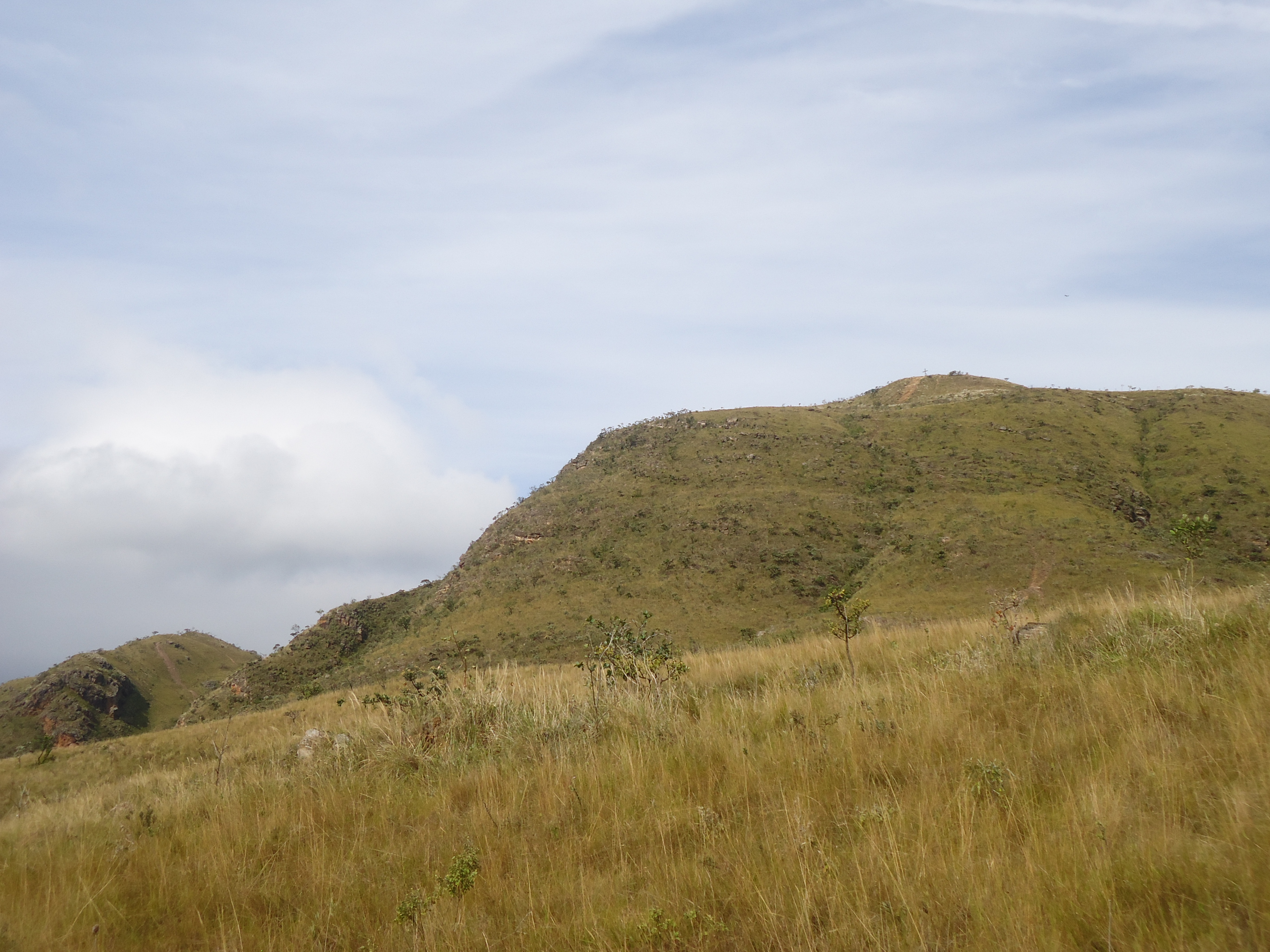
View of the fields at the top of the mountain

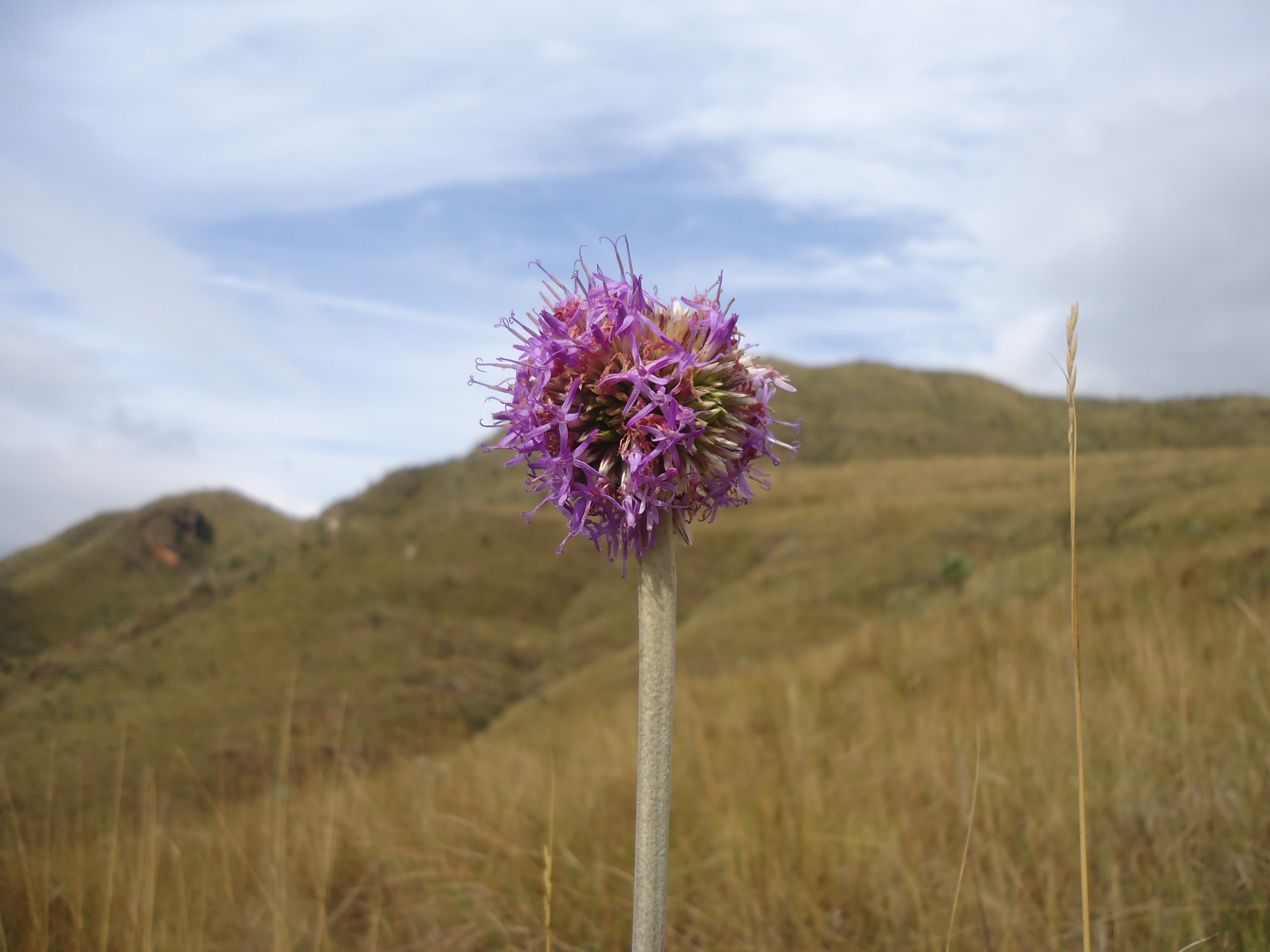
Typical flower of the Três Pontas Mountains

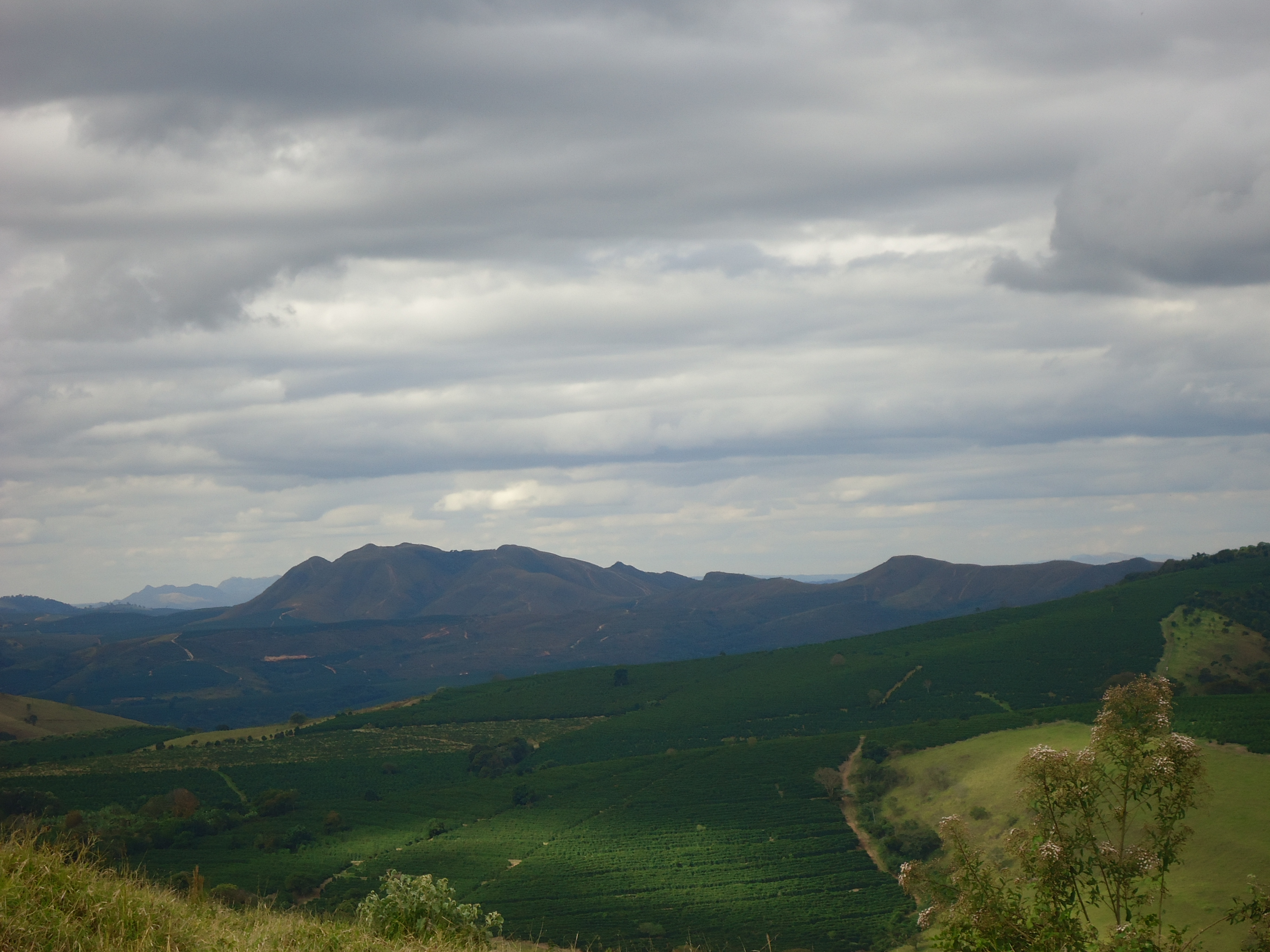
View of the mountain from afar

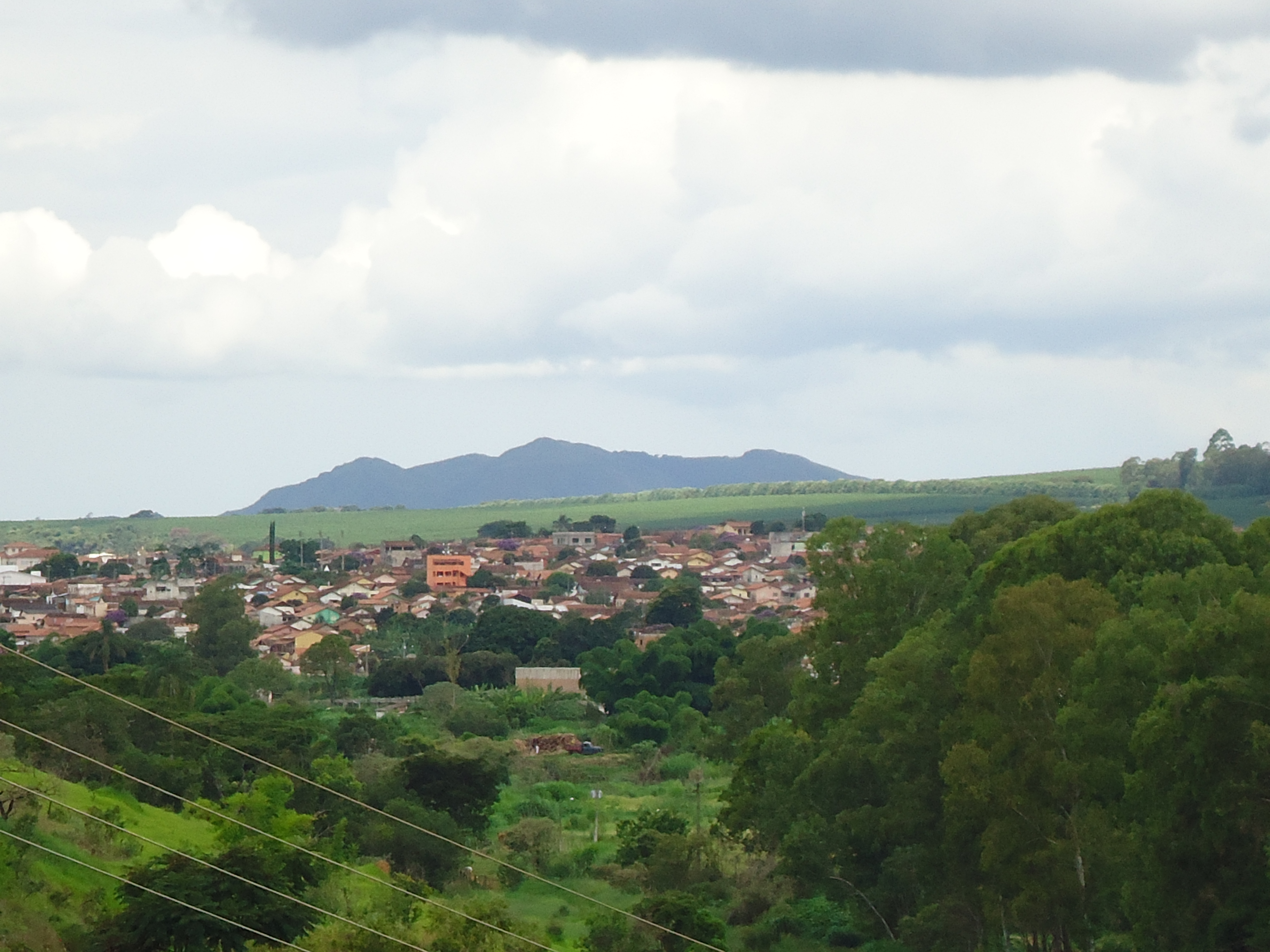
The mountain seen from the urban area

== See also ==
- Mantiqueira Mountains
- Bocaina Mountains
- Cerrado
- Atlantic Forest
- Rupestrian fields
- Family
- Genus
