= Greenwood Gardens =

Coordinates: 40.7442°N 74.3075°W

Greenwood Gardens is a 28-acre (11 ha) formal Italianate garden located in Short Hills in Essex County, New Jersey. It is located at 274 Old Short Hills Rd, Short Hills, NJ 07078.

== History ==
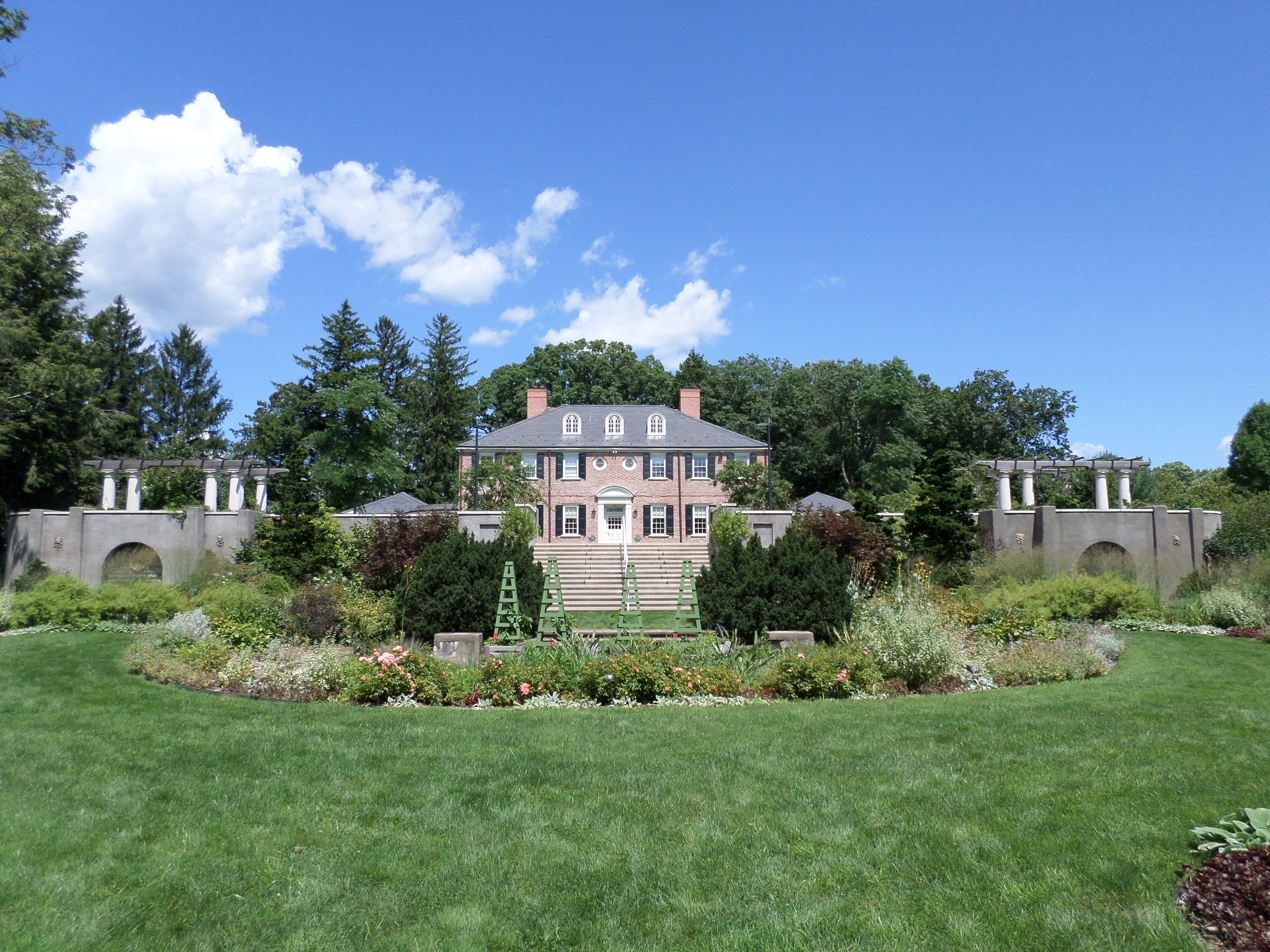
The Greenwood House and Gardens (August 2016)

Joseph Day, a prominent real estate auctioneer, purchased 79 acres (32 ha) of land in 1906, dubbed "Pleasant Days". Construction on Day's home was designed by William W. Renwick and built by Rafael Guastavino's Guastavino Fireproof Construction Company. The home was an Italiante mansion with 28 rooms. The main style of architecture includes tile and stucco. The property also included gardens, terraces, and pergolas built with local stone and decorated with tiles. There are more buildings on the property, all of which are still around today. One such property is called the Carriage House and was used as a stable.

The property remained with Days until his death in 1944, whereupon a majority of the land was purchased by Peter B. Blanchard Jr. and was rechristened The Greenwoods. Blanchard's stewardship of the land saw significant aesthetic and horticultural changes, beginning with the demolition of the Days' Mediterranean-style mansion and the construction of a Colonial-Revival style home. He had a deep love for nature, often walking at the South Mountain Reservation and teaching Biology. Blanchard wrote Greenwood: A Garden Path to Nature and the Past where he recalled stories of the Day and Blanchard families at Greenwood Gardens.The Blanchard's were also primarily responsible for the growth and diversification of the namesake gardens on the property, planting hundreds of ornamental trees and shrubs.

After Peter Blanchard died in 2000 and in accordance with his wishes, Greenwood Gardens was designated a nonprofit organization in 2002 and is one of 16 gardens nationwide that is supported by The Garden Conservancy. The following years saw the beginnings of a comprehensive renovation of the property; efforts were made to refurbish the forecourt, retaining walls and many of the statues and assorted ornamentation.

In 2019, new construction began on the Reflecting Pool Terrace to recreate the original pool from the 1920s. When the garden reopened after the pandemic in 2020, 4,300 people visited the gardens in a span of two months.

== Notable features ==
Greenwood Gardens is home to several unique architectural and artistic creations. Two of the most prominent works of art on the property are a wrought iron gate featuring a bird, vines and assorted plants created by Samuel Yellin, and a bronze statue of a boy holding two geese created by Emilio Angela. In addition to the main house the property boasts a summerhouse and teahouse constructed in 1920, and several cottages meant to house workers to maintain the grounds.

== Admission ==
Prospective visitors can gain access to the garden through a one-time admission fee, or by becoming a member of the Gardens. Greenwood Gardens hosts periodic events including educational tours and musical events. In 2026, the Gardens announced they would host a series of music and dance performances.
