= The Garden Conservancy =

American nonprofit organization

- Formation: 1989
- Founder: Francis Cabot
- Purpose: To preserve, share, and celebrate America's gardens
- Headquarters: Greenwich, Connecticut
- Region served: United States
- President: James Brayton Hall
- Website: www.gardenconservancy.org

The Garden Conservancy is a leading nonprofit organization working to preserve, share, and celebrate America's gardens and diverse gardening traditions. Through national programs, strategic partnerships, and public engagement, the Conservancy raises awareness of the vital role gardens play in the country’s cultural, historical, and environmental fabric. The organization is based in Greenwich, Connecticut.

== History and Mission ==
Since its establishment in 1989, the Garden Conservancy has supported the preservation of more than 100 significant gardens across the United States and developed a range of public programs to promote education and engagement with gardening. Its initiatives focus on helping both emerging and established gardens thrive as long-term community assets, drawing on expertise in design, restoration, and garden management.

The Conservancy was founded by Francis H. Cabot, who was inspired to create the organization after visiting Ruth Bancroft’s dry garden in Walnut Creek, California. The visit led to the recognition of a broader need to protect privately owned gardens with horticultural or design significance.

Leadership

Antonia Adezio served as the Garden Conservancy's founding president from 1989 to 2012. Working with founder Francis H. Cabot, she helped establish the organization's national preservation activities and oversaw the introduction of the Open Days program in 1995. During her tenure, the Conservancy expanded its activities across the United States.

Jenny du Pont succeeded Adezio in 2013 and served until August, 2016. During her presidency, the Conservancy continued its garden preservation and public education programs and published Outstanding American Gardens: A Celebration of 25 Years of the Garden Conservancy.

James Brayton Hall became president and chief executive officer on June 1, 2017. He previously served as deputy director of the Norton Museum of Art and executive director of the Providence Preservation Society. His tenure has included the development of preservation and grant-making initiatives, as well as the organization's relocation from Garrison, New York, to Greenwich, Connecticut.

== Programs ==
=== Open Days ===
Launched in 1995, Open Days has grown into the Conservancy’s flagship public program and the largest private garden-visiting initiative in the United States. It provides access to thousands of privately owned gardens across the country, many of which are not otherwise open to visitors. By 2025, the program had showcased more than 4,500 gardens in over 40 states. A 2024 New York Times profile described the program as “quietly unlocking some of the most impressive gardens in the country,” highlighting its role in expanding public appreciation of garden design and horticulture.

=== Garden Preservation ===
The Garden Conservancy has worked with more than 100 gardens to preserve their horticultural, historical, and cultural value. Its preservation efforts involve advising on restoration, assisting with nonprofit transitions, and helping with long-term sustainability. The Conservancy has provided support to gardens including Alcatraz Island (California), Ruth Bancroft Garden (California), Greenwood Gardens (New Jersey), John P. Humes Japanese Stroll Garden (New York), The John Fairey Garden (Texas), and Van Vleck House and Gardens (New Jersey).

The Garden Conservancy has also been involved with historic properties such as The Chase Garden in Washington, The Fells in New Hampshire, Montrose in North Carolina, Rocky Hills in New York, Steepletop in New York, and Yew Dell Gardens in Kentucky.

=== Documentary Films ===
Through the Suzanne & Frederic Rheinstein Garden Documentary Film Program, the Conservancy produces films that explore gardens as cultural landscapes. Recent projects include Earth, I Thank You: The Garden & Legacy of Anne Spencer, which premiered at the Smithsonian National Museum of African American History and Culture in 2025.

Another film, A Garden in Conversation: Louise Agee Wrinkle’s Southern Woodland Sanctuary, focused on ecological gardening practices.

=== Public Programs and Education ===
The Conservancy organizes lectures, symposia, webinars, and the Garden Futures Summit, a forum for exploring the cultural and environmental significance of gardens. The inaugural Garden Futures Summit was held in New York City in 2023 and brought together designers, horticulturists, architects, and cultural leaders to discuss the future of gardens in public life.

=== Grants ===
The Garden Conservancy awards grants to support garden preservation and innovation. Its programs include the Garden Futures Fund, which supports innovative, community-centered projects. It also supports the Jean and John Greene Prize, which recognizes excellence in garden preservation. Past recipients of the Greene Prize include McKee Botanical Garden in Vero Beach, Florida; Ganna Walska Lotusland in Montecito, California; Wethersfield Estate & Garden in Amenia, New York; Untermyer Park and Gardens in Yonkers, New York; and Filoli in Woodside, California.

== See also ==
- Francis Cabot
- Anne Spencer House
- Ganna Walska Lotusland
- McKee Botanical Garden
- Greenwood Gardens
