= Minas (album) =

Studio album by Milton Nascimento
- Released: 1975
- Recorded: October 1975
- Genre: MPB
- Length: 40:22
- Label: Odeon
- Producer: Ronaldo Bastos

Milton Nascimento chronology
| Native Dancer (1975) | Minas (1975) | Geraes (1976) |

Professional ratings
Review scores
| Source | Rating |
|---|---|
| AllMusic | 4.5/5 stars |
| The Rolling Stone Record Guide | 4/5 stars |

Minas is the seventh studio album by Brazilian singer-songwriter Milton Nascimento, released in 1975 through Odeon Records. The album was recorded in October 1975 in Rio de Janeiro. The title of the album originates from a friend of Nascimento, who observed that "Minas" matched the first letters of his full name. The album was popular upon its release in Brazil and continues to rank as one of Nascimento's best-selling albums.

== Track listing ==
Side one
| No. | Title | Writer(s) | Length |
|---|---|---|---|
| 1. | "Minas" | Novelli | 2:31 |
| 2. | "Fé Cega, Faca Amolada" | Milton Nascimento; Ronaldo Bastos | 4:35 |
| 3. | "Beijo Partido" | Toninho Horta | 3:50 |
| 4. | "Saudade dos Aviões da Panair (Conversando no Bar)" | Fernando Brant; Nascimento | 4:27 |
| 5. | "Gran Circo" | Márcio Borges; Nascimento | 3:32 |
| Total length: | | | 18:55 |

Side two
| No. | Title | Writer(s) | Length |
|---|---|---|---|
| 1. | "Ponta de Areia" | Brant; Nascimento | 4:30 |
| 2. | "Trastevere" | Nascimento; Bastos | 4:20 |
| 3. | "Idolatrada" | Brant; Nascimento | 4:45 |
| 4. | "Leila (Venha ser Feliz)" | Nascimento | 3:27 |
| 5. | "Paula e Bebeto" | Veloso; Nascimento | 2:15 |
| 6. | "Simples" | Nelson Ângelo | 2:10 |
| Total length: | | | 21:27 |

== Bibliography ==
- Grasse, Jonathon (19 April 2022). Hearing Brazil: Music and Histories in Minas Gerais. New York: Simon & Schuster.
