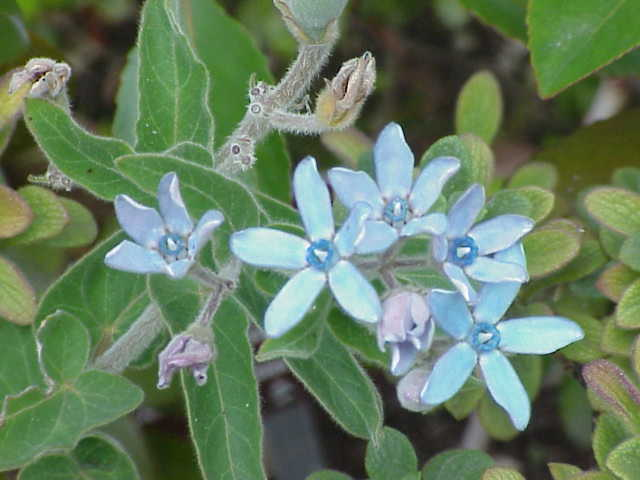

Scientific classification
- Kingdom: Plantae
- Clade: Tracheophytes
- Clade: Angiosperms
- Clade: Eudicots
- Clade: Asterids
- Order: Gentianales
- Family: Apocynaceae
- Genus: Oxypetalum
- Species: O. coeruleum

Binomial name
- Oxypetalum coeruleum (D. Don ex Sweet) Decne.

Synonyms
- Tweedia caerulea D. Don ex Sweet; Tweedia versicolor Hook.

= Oxypetalum coeruleum =

Species of flowering plant

Oxypetalum coeruleum is a species of flowering plant, native to South America from southern Brazil to Uruguay. The synonymous name Tweedia caerulea is also used. Growing to 100 cm (39 in) long, it is a straggling evergreen perennial with heart shaped, gray-green, downy leaves. It is grown for its clear pale blue, star-shaped flowers, which are long lasting and cut well. The summer flowers age to purple and are followed by 30 cm (12 in) long, boat-shaped seed pods. The seeds have downy parachute-like tufts (cypsela).

The cultivar 'Alba' has white flowers, while 'Rosea' has pink flowers.

Oxypetalum coeruleum requires full sun in a well-drained soil that is dry. Propagation is via seed. With a minimum temperature range of 3–5 °C (37–41 °F), it can be grown outdoors in a frost-free, sheltered environment. Alternatively it can be grown as an annual.

This plant has gained the Royal Horticultural Society's Award of Garden Merit.
