= Lepidoptera migration =

Migration of butterflies or moths

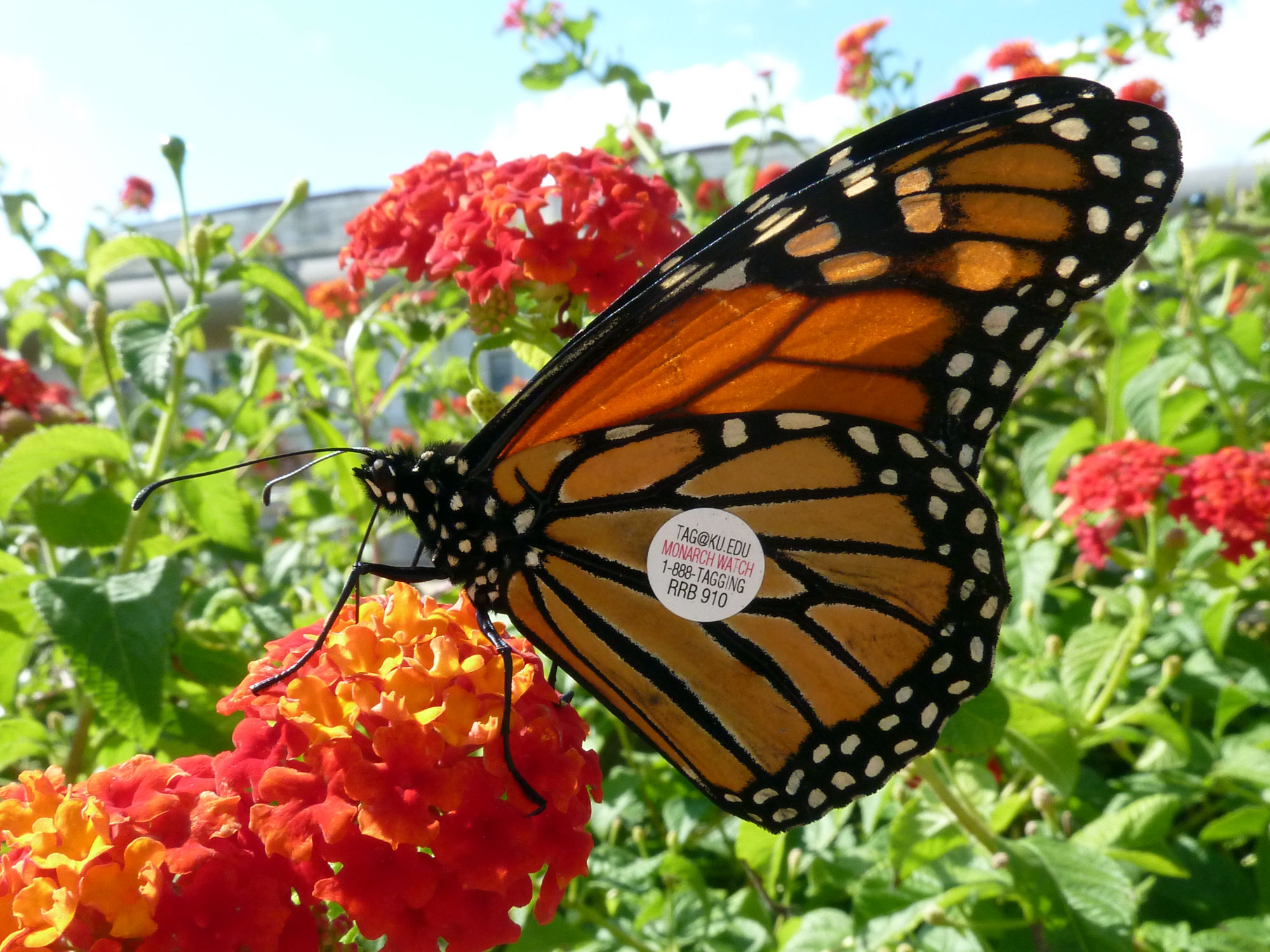
Monarch butterfly tagged to track its migration

Danaus plexippus migration map in North America

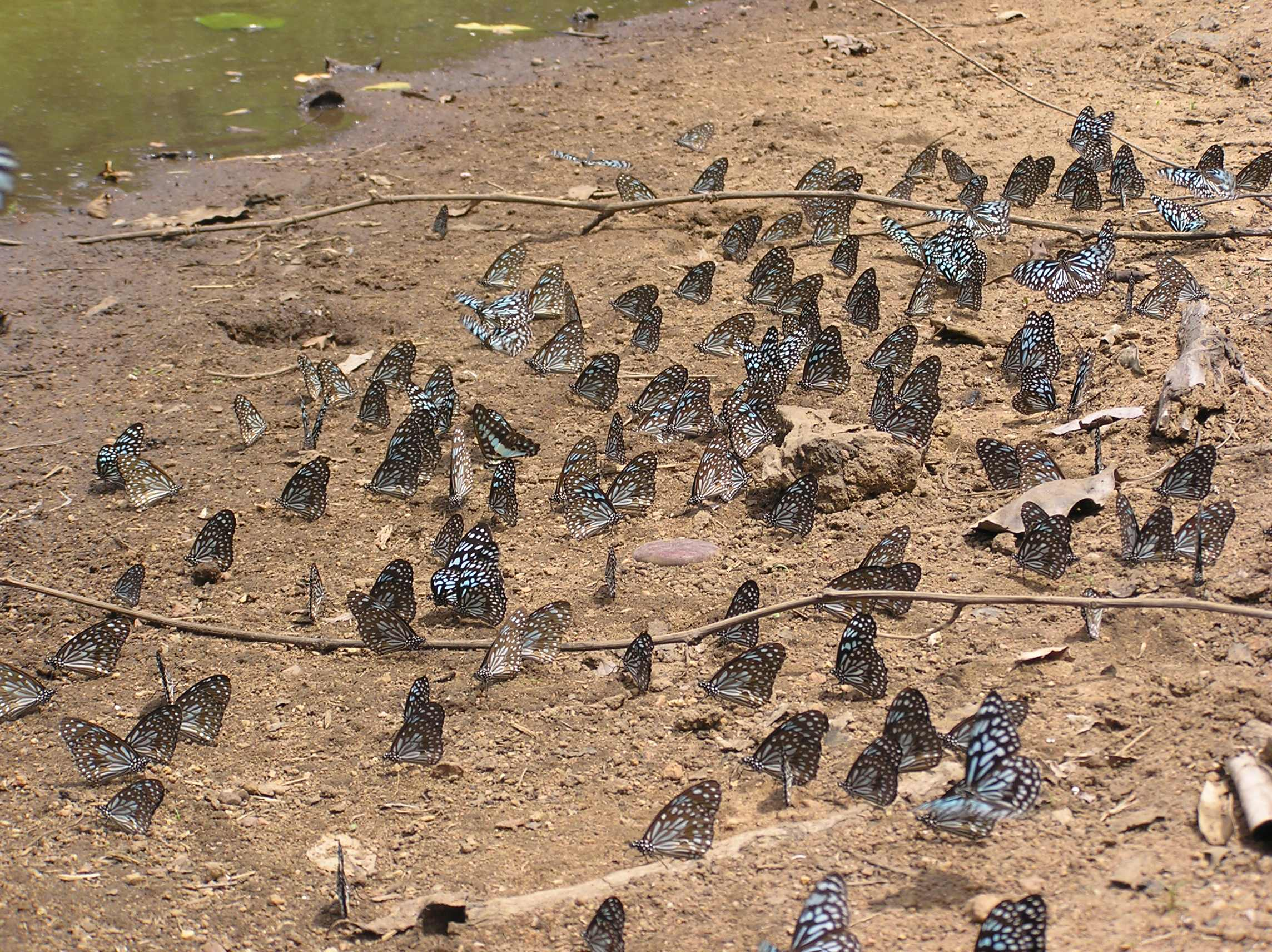
Tirumala septentrionis migrate in millions between Eastern Ghats and Western Ghats in India.

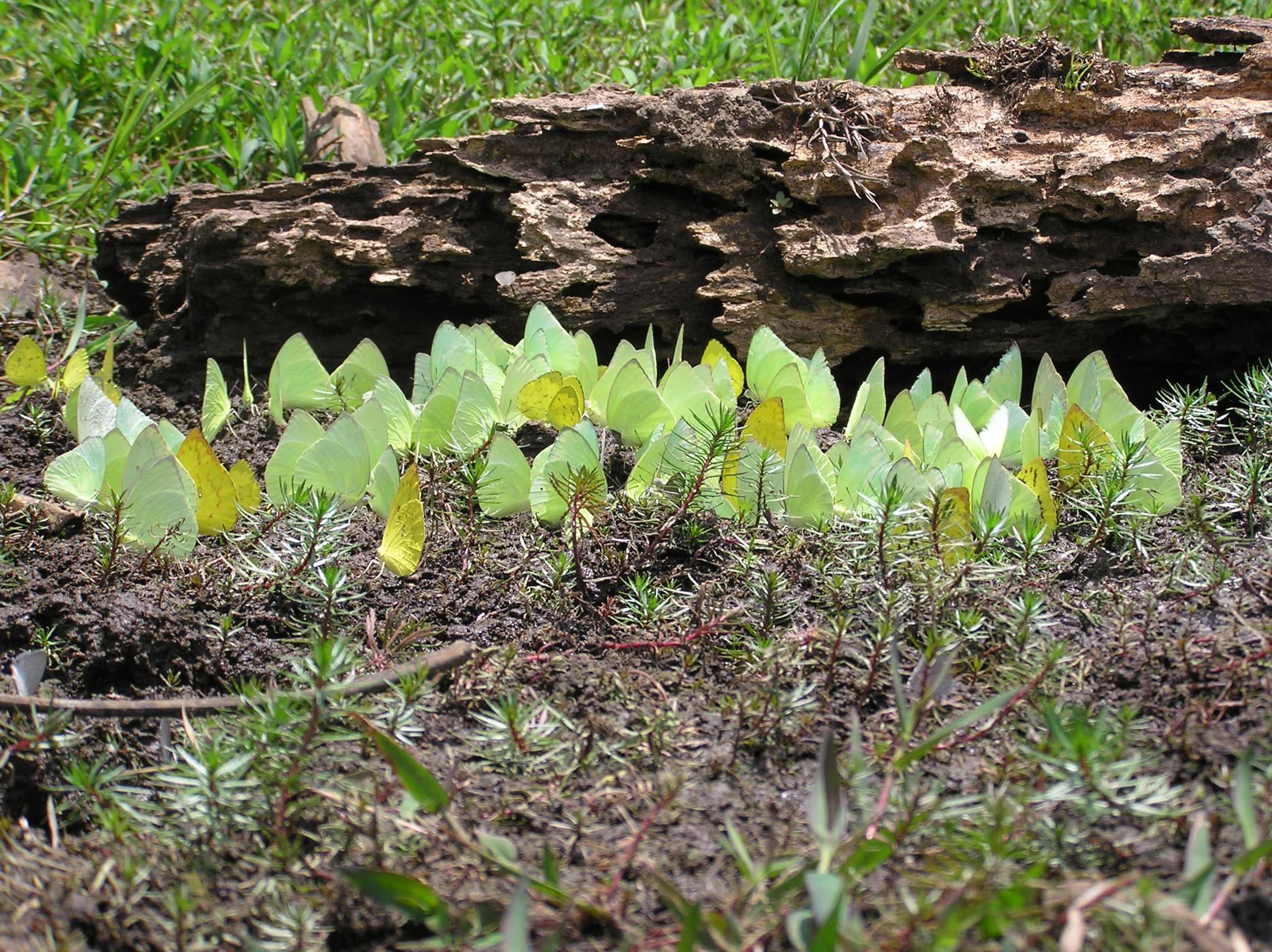
Catopsilia pomona migrate regularly in South India and Himalayas.

Many populations of Lepidoptera (butterflies or moths) migrate, sometimes long distances, to and from areas which are only suitable for part of the year. Lepidopterans migrate on all continents except Antarctica, including from or within subtropical and tropical areas. By migrating, these species can avoid unfavorable circumstances, including weather, food shortage or over-population. In some lepidopteran species, all individuals migrate; in others, only some migrate.

The best-known lepidopteran migration is that of the eastern population of the monarch butterfly which migrates from southern Canada to wintering sites in central Mexico. In late winter/early spring, the adult monarchs leave the Transvolcanic mountain range in Mexico for a more northern climate. Mating occurs and the females begin seeking out milkweed to lay their eggs, usually first in northern Mexico and southern Texas. The caterpillars hatch and develop into adults that move north, where more offspring can go as far as central Canada until next migratory cycle.

The Danaids in South India are prominent migrants, between the Eastern Ghats and Western Ghats. Three species will be involved in this, namely Tirumala septentrionis, Euploea core and Euploea sylvester. Sometimes they are joined by lemon pansy (Junonia lemonias), common emigrant (Catopsilia pomona), tawny coster (Acraea terpsicore) and blue tiger (Tirumala limniace).

== Definition ==
Migration in Lepidoptera means a regular, predictable movement of a population from one place to another, determined by the seasons. There is no unambiguous definition of migratory butterfly or migratory moth, and this also applies to proposals to divide them into classes. Migration means different things to behavioral scientists and ecologists. The former emphasize the act of moving whereas the latter discriminate between whether the movement has been ecologically significant or not. Migration may be viewed as "a behavioural process with ecological consequences".

Migration in Lepidoptera takes place in two of the three modes of migration identified by Johnson (Johnson, 1969). In the first mode (also Johnson's first), the Lepidoptera move in one direction in their short life-span and do not return. An example is the pierid butterfly, Ascia monuste, which breeds in Florida but sometimes migrates along the coast up to 160 kilometers to breed in more suitable areas.

In the second mode (Johnson's third), migration takes place to a place of hibernation or aestivation where they undergo diapause and the same generation survives to return. The classic example is that of the nymphalid monarch butterfly (Danuas plexippus).

=== Adventive ===
Species that are recorded in unexpected areas (adventive species) are not considered to be migratory species, because these did not leave their habitat on their own strength. Examples are species that are imported as egg or caterpillar alongside of their host plants or individuals that were reared by a collector but have escaped. An example of an introduced species is Galleria mellonella, which is found all over the world, because it is reared as food for captive birds and reptiles. At times it is difficult to decide if a species is adventive or migratory. Migratory species like Chrysodeixis chalcites and Helicoverpa armigera would be able to reach western Europe on their own, but are also common in greenhouses.

=== Seasonal migration ===
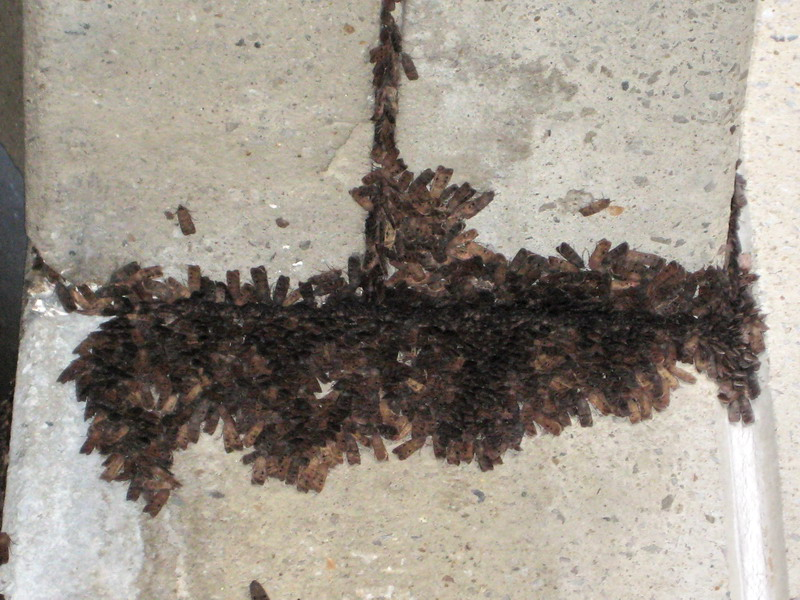
Australian species Agrotis infusa spends the summer as an imago in the Australian Alps, and is sometimes found in buildings in large numbers.

Lepidoptera migration is often seasonal. With species of which all individuals migrate, the population moves between areas in the summer and winter season or the dry and wet season.

For species of which only part of the population migrates, seasonal migration is hard to determine. They can maintain themselves in part of their habitat but also reach areas where they cannot establish a permanent population. They only live there in the season that is most favorable for the species. Some of the species have the habit of returning to their permanent residence at the end of the season.

==== Difference with bird migration ====
An important difference with bird migration is that an individual butterfly or moth usually migrates in one direction, while birds migrate back and forth multiple times within their lifespan. This is due to the short lifespan as an imago. Amazingly the monarch receives no navigation instruction for the migration from their parents, unlike birds. Species that migrate back and forth, usually do so in different generations. There are however, some exceptions:

- The famous migration of the monarch butterfly in North America. This species migrates back and forth in one generation, though it completes only part of the journey in both directions in that generation. No individual completes the entire journey which is spread over a number of generations. The imago of the last summer generation is born in North America, migrates to Mexico, Florida, or California and stays there for the winter. After the winter it migrates back to the north to reproduce. In a couple of generations, the monarch migrates north to Canada.
- The migration of the bogong moth in Australia. This species migrates from south-eastern Australia to the Australian Alps in the summer to avoid the heat. After the summer it returns to reproduce.

== Flight behaviour ==
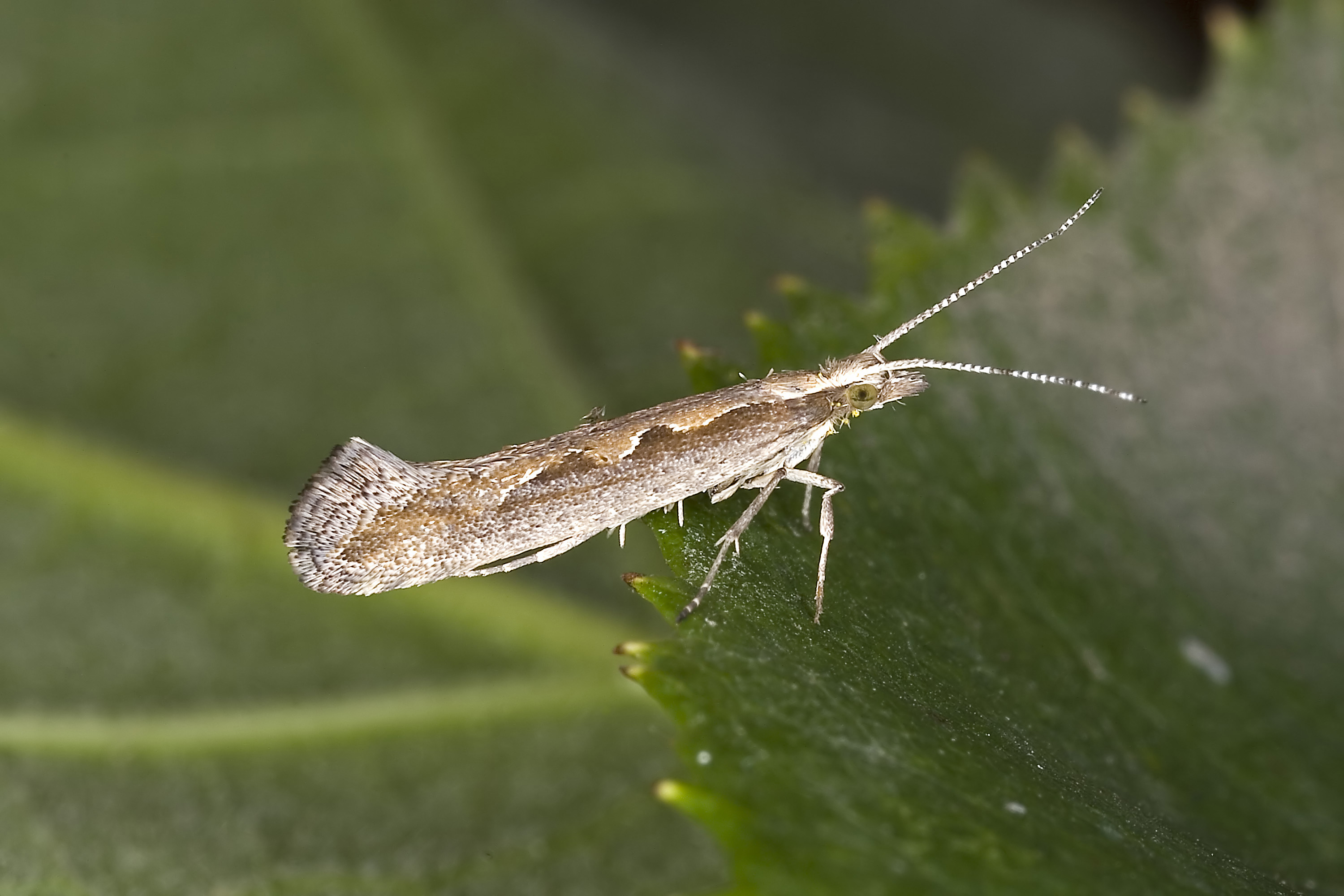
The small diamondback moth is a migratory species which can be found at altitudes of a 100 meters. It is capable of covering over 3,000 kilometers.

Migratory Lepidoptera are, in most cases, excellent flyers. Species like Vanessa atalanta are capable of managing a fierce headwind. In case of headwind, they usually fly low and are more goal-oriented. During migration, some species can be found at high altitudes, ranging to up to two kilometers. This is especially noteworthy for day-flying species like Vanessa atalanta, since the temperatures on these altitudes are low and day-flying species depend on the outside temperature to stay warm. It is thought that Vanessa atalanta produces enough body warmth during flight since it has also been recorded migrating at night.

In the case of transcontinental migration where distances are large, the flying speed of the butterfly (of the order of 3 metres per second or less) is inadequate for timely completion of journey. The migration is carried out by relying on heavy winds; a persistent wind speed of 10 metres per second being able to provide a displacement of 300 to 400 kilometers in a single day. For example, the painted lady (Vanessa cardui) migrates from Africa to Spain aided by tail winds.

That the migratory species are good flyers, is not the same as saying they are robust flyers. The small diamondback moth is also a migratory species that migrates 3,000 kilometers and can be found up to altitudes of 100 meters or more.

Vanessa cardui migration between North Africa and Europe

=== Navigation ===
To be able to migrate over long distances, species must be able to navigate. There are several ways they do this.

Landscape: Lepidoptera use coastal lines, mountains, but also roads to orient themselves. Above sea it has been observed that the flight direction is much more accurate if the landscape on the coast is still visible.

Celestial navigation: Butterflies are known to be capable of navigation with the help of the Sun. They can also navigate by using polarized light. The polarization of the Sun's light changes with the angle of the rays, hence they can also navigate with cloudy weather. There are indications that they can even make corrections depending on the time on a day. Diamondback moths are known to fly in a straight trajectory which is not dependent on the angle of the Sun's rays. Tests have been performed to interfere with the biological clock of certain species by keeping them in the dark and then observing if they would choose for other flight paths. The conclusion was that some species did, and others did not. Research on monarchs demonstrates that with removal of antennae, the location of the circadian clock, individuals do not localize in any one direction during flight as they do with antennae intact. Night flyers cannot use sun light for navigation. Most of these species rely on the Moon and stars instead.

Earth's magnetic field: A number of moths use the Earth's magnetic field to navigate, as a study of the stray heart and dart suggests. Another study, this time of the migratory behaviour of the silver Y, showed that this species, even at high altitudes, can correct its course with changing winds, and prefers flying with favourable winds, which suggests a great sense of direction. A study in Panama of Aphrissa statira, which migrate in large groups annually, found that this species loses its navigational capacity when exposed to a magnetic field, suggesting they use the Earth's magnetic field to determine their direction of flight in migration.

=== Multigeneration migration ===
Some species of Lepidoptera are able to migrate over multiple generations. Painted ladies (Vanessa cardui) are known for the longest migration on Earth, approximately 9000 miles round trip (nearly double that of the Monarch butterfly). This journey may take up to six generations of Painted Ladies, though some individuals have been recorded to fly a staggering 4200km. Genetic analysis of pollen grains transported by hundreds of butterflies collected across ten countries allowed researchers to track down the origin of a migration event that took place over 9 months from 2018 to 2019. Most likely, the butterfly outbreak originated in northern Arabia and the Middle East, when vegetation was unusually abundant in late 2018 to early 2019. Their migration to eastern Europe, apparently spanned two or three generations and finally reached western Europe during the summer of 2019.

== Areas where migratory butterflies and moths can be found ==
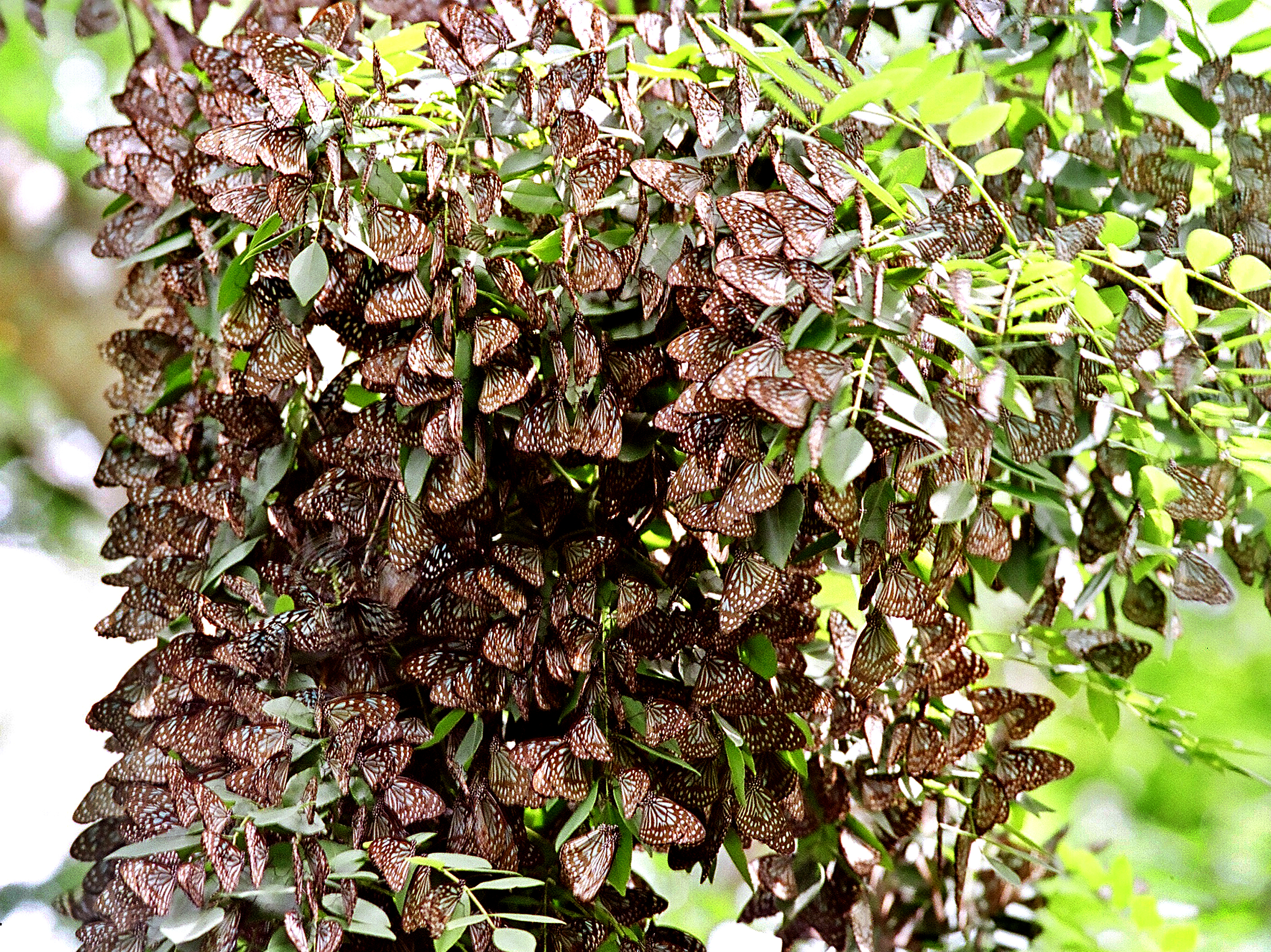
Blue tiger (Tirumala limniace) butterflies resting while migrating, Western Ghats, South India.

Migratory Lepidoptera can be found on all continents, migrating within or from the Tropics and Subtropics. North, they can be found up to Spitsbergen, above the Arctic Circle. Some migratory Lepidoptera have spread over most of the world. Some of these are pest insects, such as the diamondback moth, Helicoverpa armigera, and Trichoplusia ni.

=== Examples of migratory Lepidoptera ===
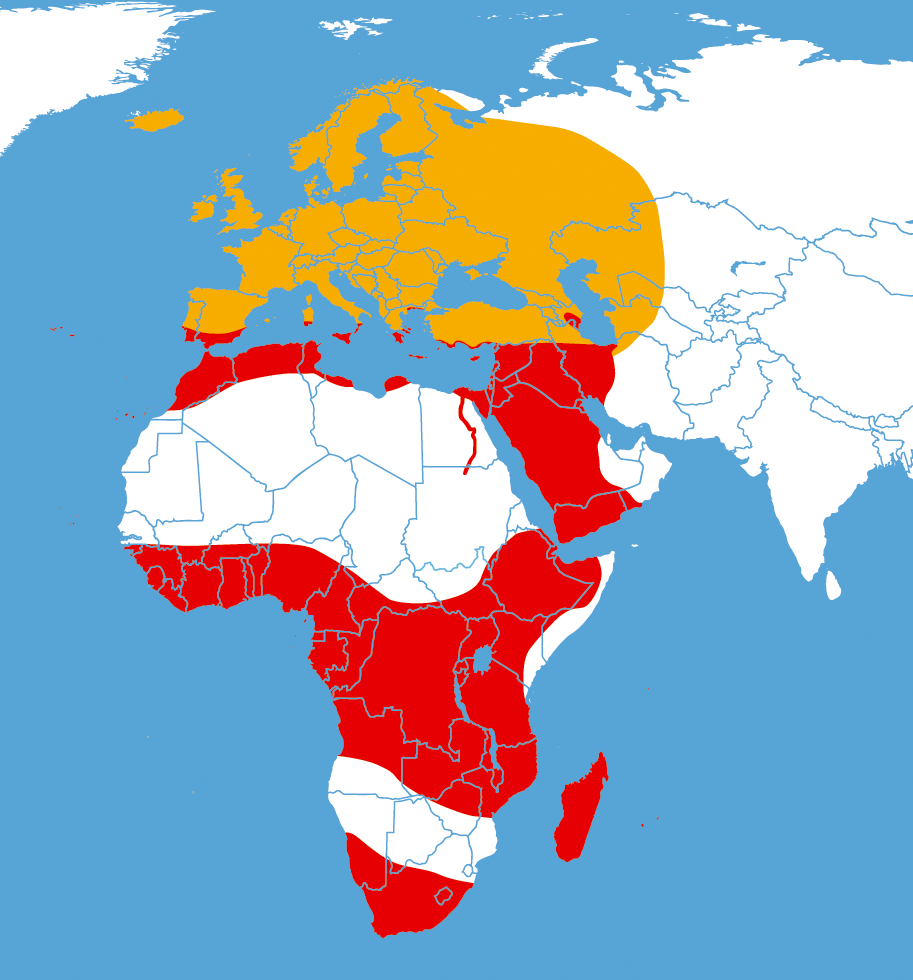
Distribution map of Acherontia atropos. Red, all year. orange, summer

- In the Indian subcontinent, migrating Lepidoptera are common just before the monsoon season. Over 250 species are known to migrate during this period.
- On Madagascar, Chrysiridia rhipheus migrates between populations of four plant species of the genus Omphalea, the host plant of this species. The three western Omphalea species live in dry coniferous forests, the eastern species is found in the rainforest and is the only species that is green year round.
- Rhodometra sacraria is normally found in Africa, large parts of Asia and southern Europe. At times, it migrates north and can reach central and northern Europe.
- Vanessa cardui is found all over the world, except South America, at altitudes of up to 3,000 meters above sea level. Its home, however, are subtropical steppe areas.
- Vanessa atalanta is known to migrate between the Mediterranean region and northern Europe.
- The Australian painted lady (Vanessa kershawi) periodically migrates down the coast of Australia. Occasionally, in periods of strong migration in Australia, these butterflies have been known to migrate to New Zealand. The bogong moth also migrates biannually towards and from the Australian Alps.
- Several South and Central American species of Uraniidae display a great peak in migratory behavior in certain years. In the years with a great number of migrating individuals, there are "population explosions". Individuals migrate to the south and east. There is no real re-migration to speak off. These moths feed on Omphalea species. These can be found in scattered populations all across South and Central America, but only part of the areas where they are found are a permanent habitat for these moths. Research suggests that the cause of the migration peak is an increase in toxicity when much of a single plant is eaten and decreasing toxicity when only small amounts of a certain plant are eaten.
- The migration of Euploea core, Euploea sylvester, Tirumala septentrionis, and Tirumala limniace between the Western Ghats and Eastern Ghats in India cover up to 350 to 400 km. This migration happens twice a year. The most probable reasons seem to be the heavy monsoons, reproductive diapause, and a lack of host plants, nectar and alkaloidal resource availability.
- The gatekeeper butterfly (Pyronia tithonus) from southern and eastern Britain has been expanding to northern Britain over the past three decades, despite their preference for warmer conditions.
- The clouded yellow (Colias croceus) migrates between Europe and Siberia to Northern Africa and Southern Asia.
- In North America, the true armyworm moth (Mythimna unipuncta) and the black cutworm moth (Agrotis ipsilon) migrate north in the spring to escape dangerously warm temperatures and migrate south in the fall to avoid extremely cold weather. The reproductive systems in both females and males are less developed during the south-bound migration and calling behavior increases in the north-bound migration, indicating that mating is more favored in the summer.
- Anagrapha falcifera (a celery looper) is another migratory moth in the United States.
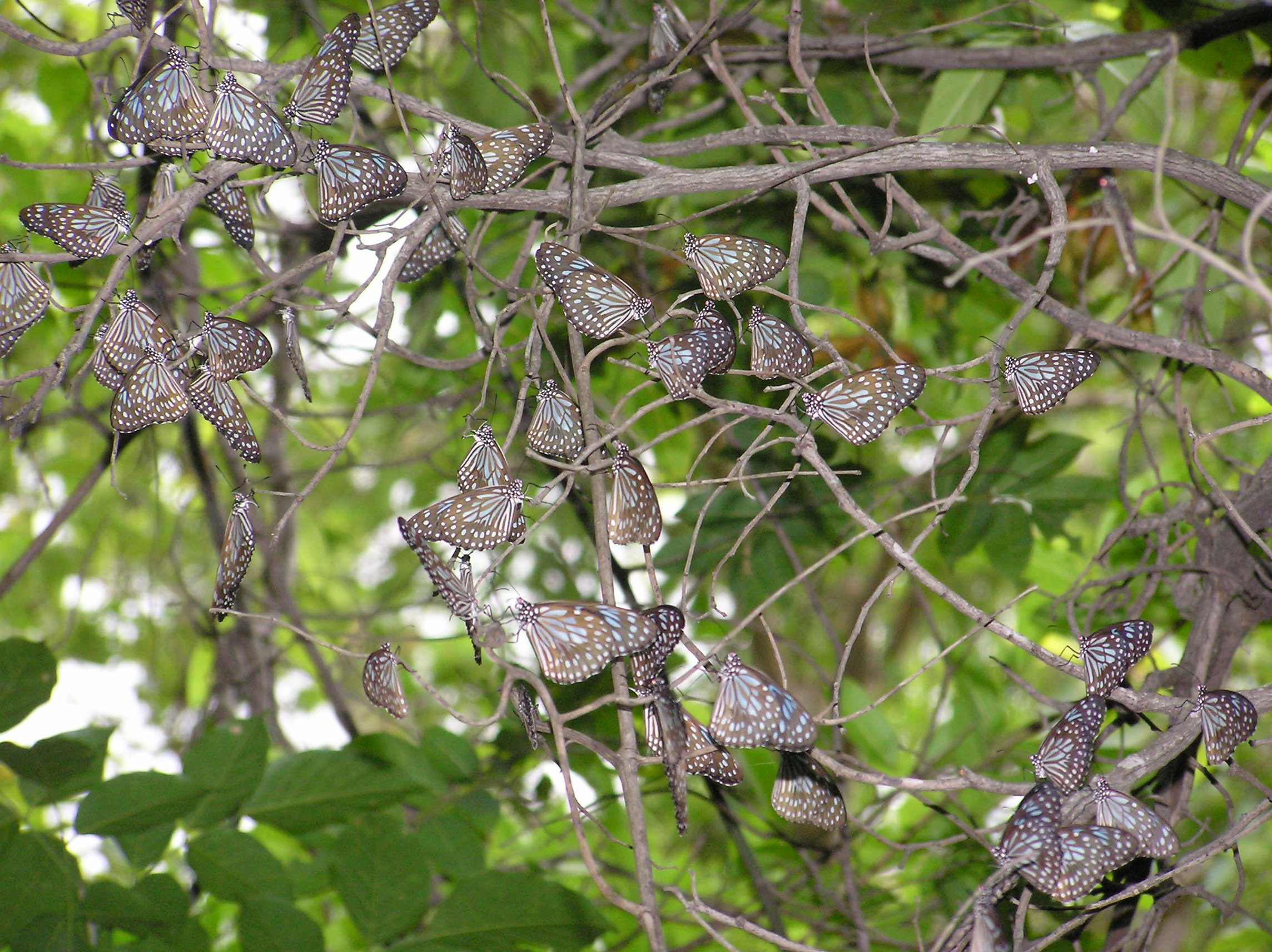
Tirumala septentrionis

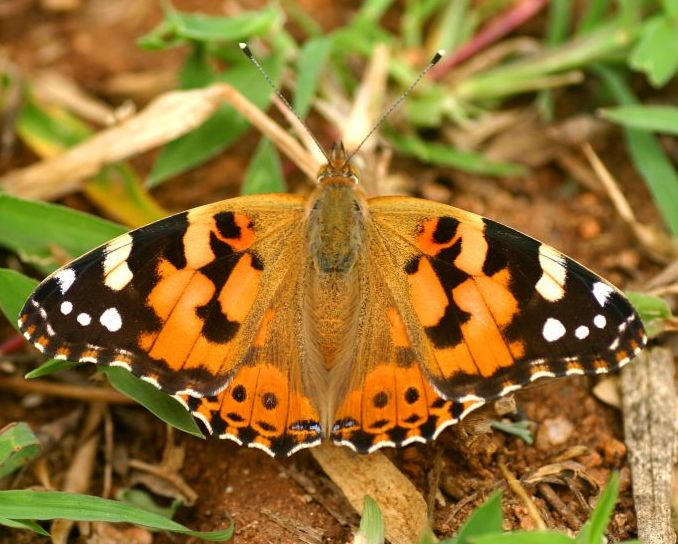
Vanessa cardui

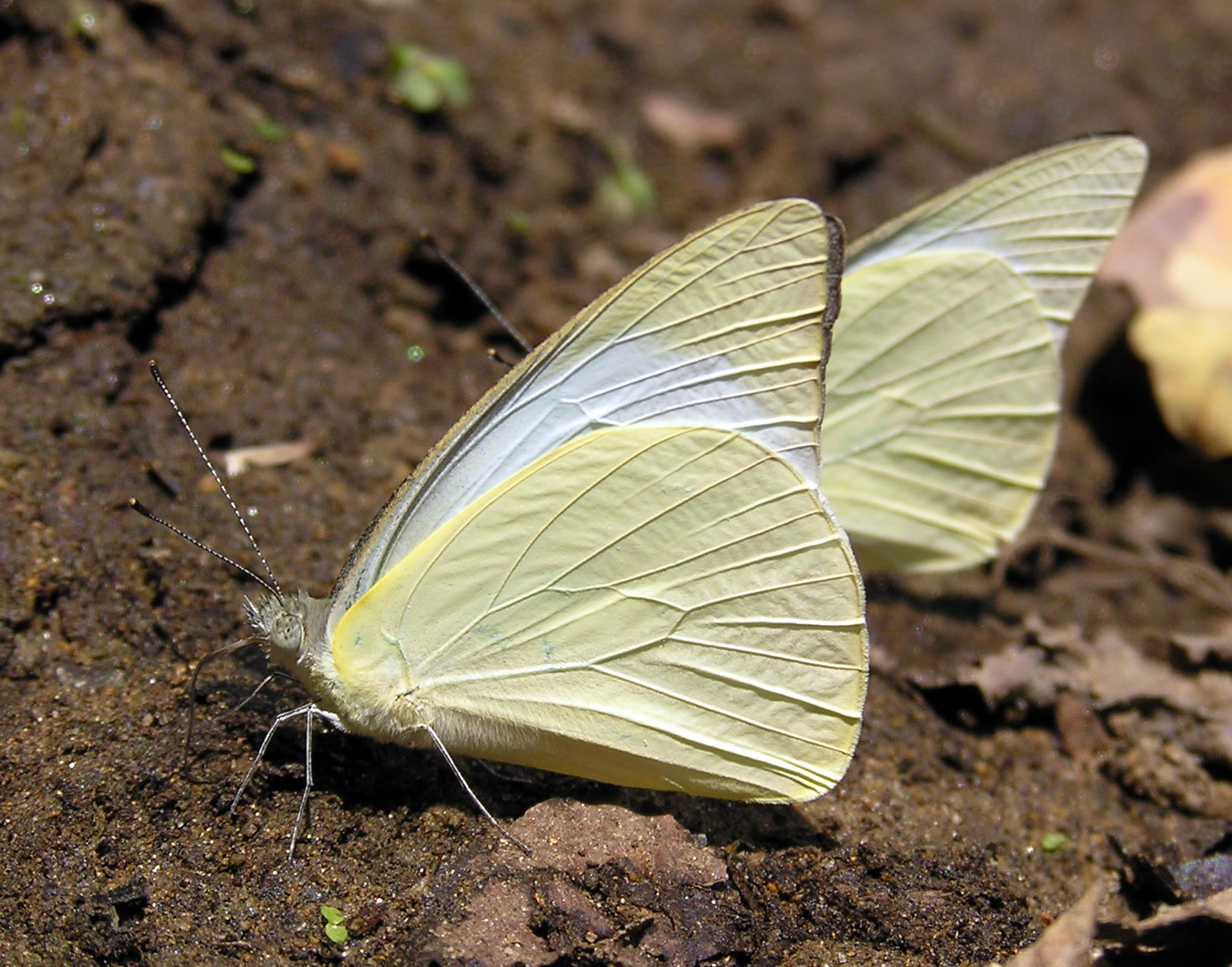
Appias albina

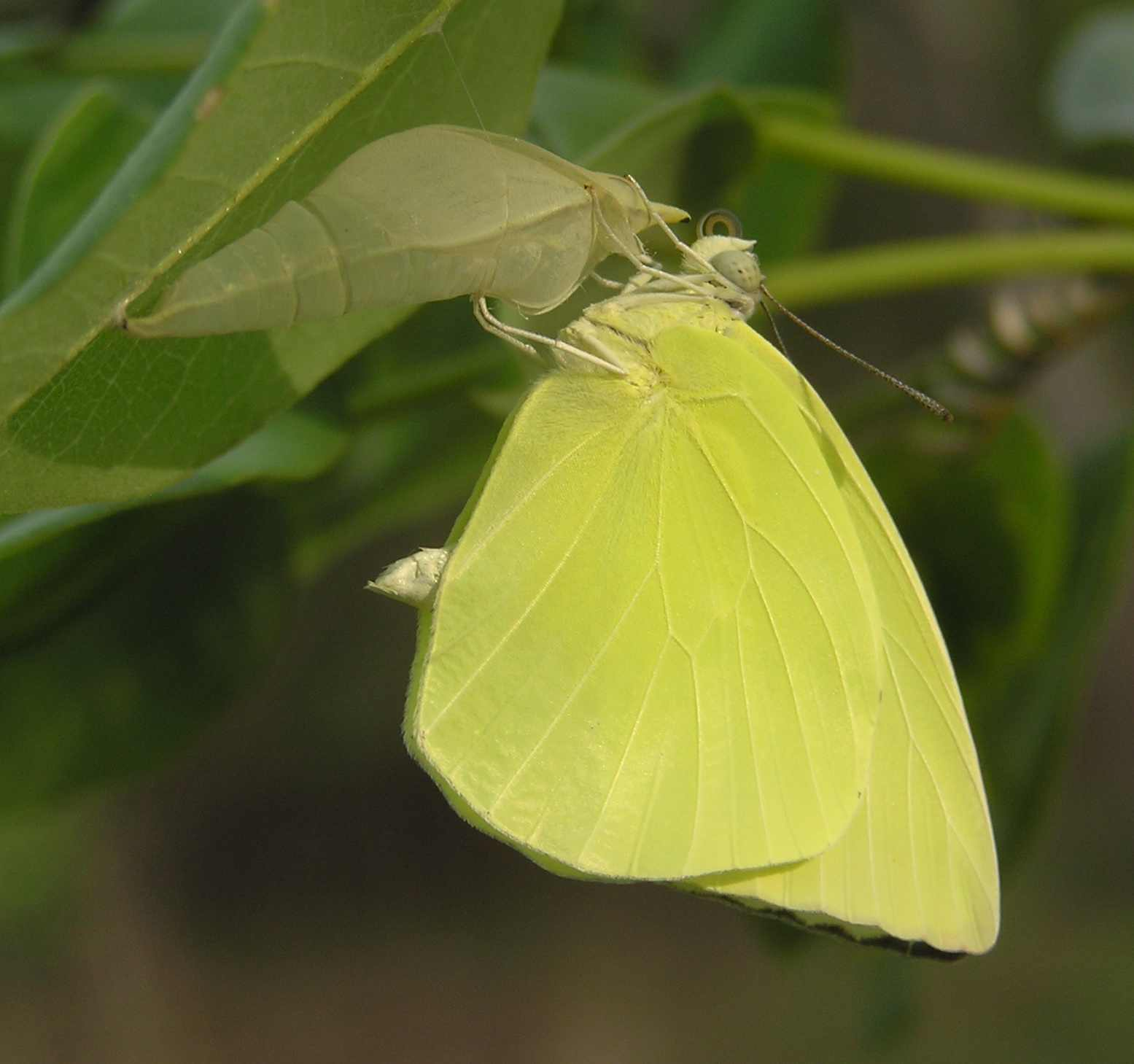
Catopsilia pomona

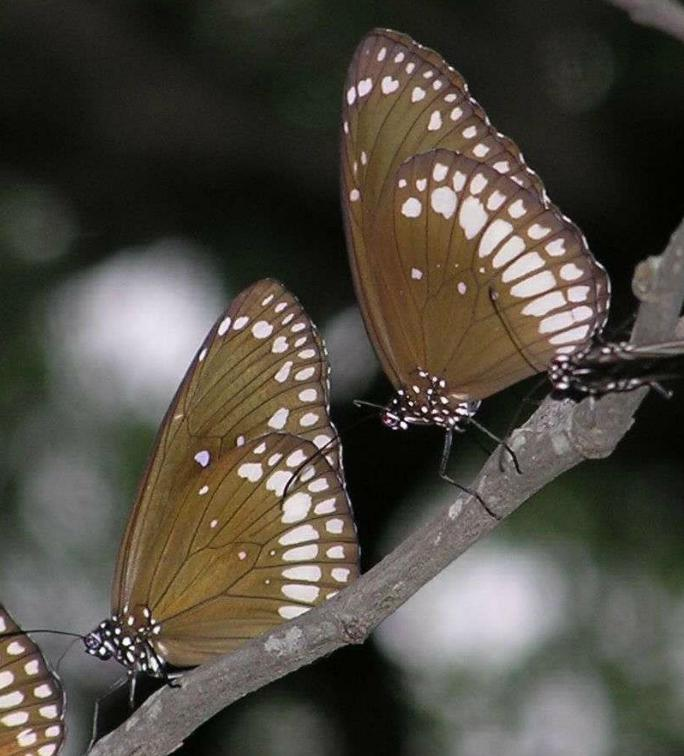
Euploea core

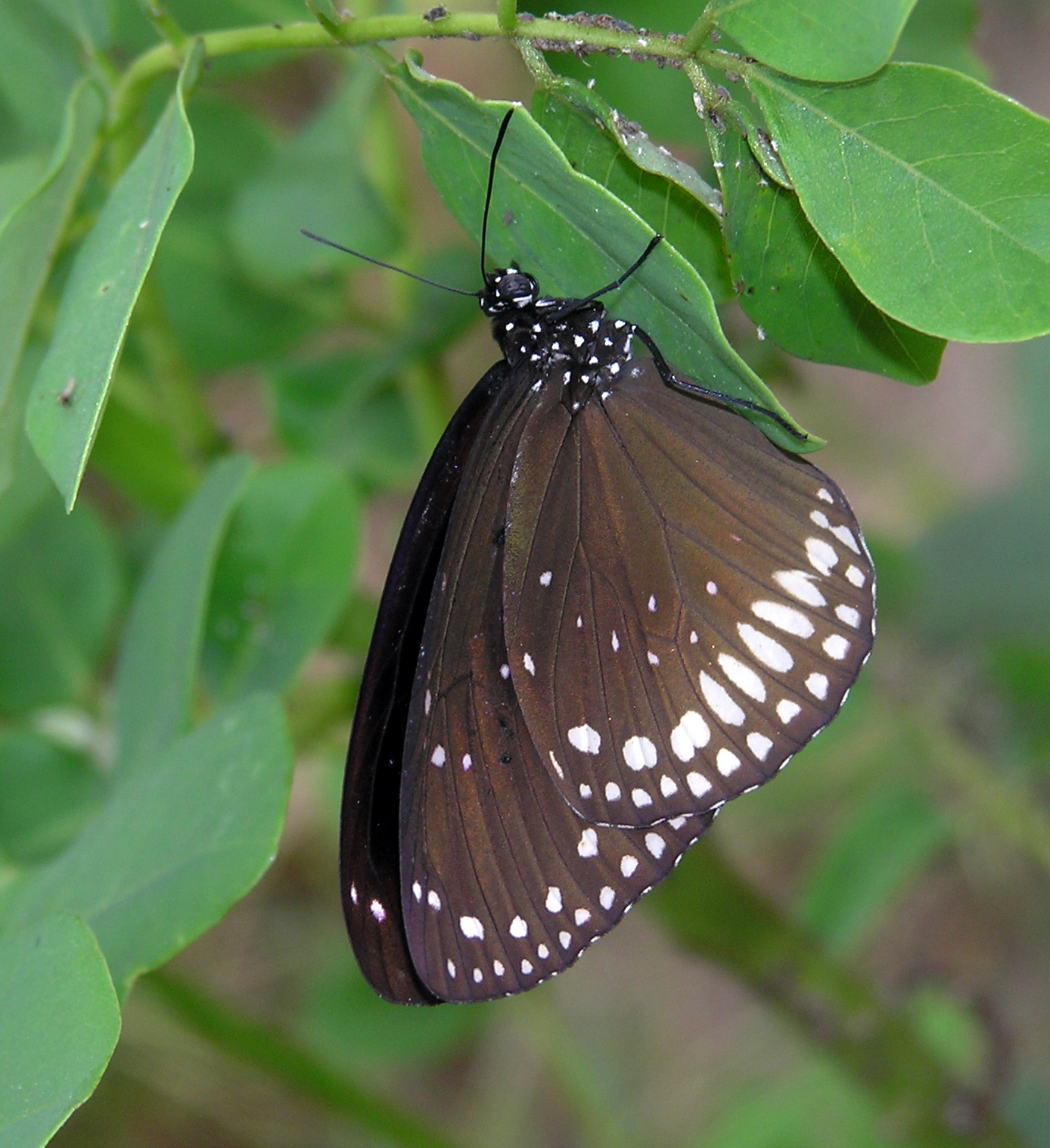
Euploea sylvester

==== Example species: Macroglossum stellatarum ====
The green areas are the areas where Macroglossum stellatarum can survive year round. In the blue areas it can be found in summer. In the yellow area it is found in winter

Macroglossum stellatarum is a moth that is recorded in the subtropical part of the Palearctic realm year round. In summer, the species disperses north up to Scandinavia and Iceland. In winter it migrates further south, deeper into Africa and to the Indian subcontinent.

In the Netherlands and Belgium, there are 100 to 200 records per year in an average year. In warm summers however, like 2005 and 2006, several thousand are recorded. In mild winters, small numbers can survive this far north, but these numbers are insufficient to call it a real population.

== Causes ==
Usually, butterflies and moths migrate to escape from potentially harmful circumstances. Examples of this are a shortage of proper food plants, an unfavorable climate, like cold or extreme rain or overpopulation.

=== Migration and evolution ===
A phenomenon like migration is an evolutionary development. By migrating, the species has survived the process of natural selection. There are a number of advantages and disadvantages to migration. An example of this is the protozoan Ophryocystis elektroscirrha a parasite of the monarch. Severely infected individuals are weak, unable to expand their wings, or unable to eclose, and have shortened lifespans, but parasite levels vary in populations. This is not the case in laboratory or commercial rearing, where after a few generations, all individuals can be infected. Infection with this parasite creates an effect known as culling whereby migrating monarchs that are infected are less likely to complete the migration. This results in overwintering populations with lower parasite loads.

== Recording ==
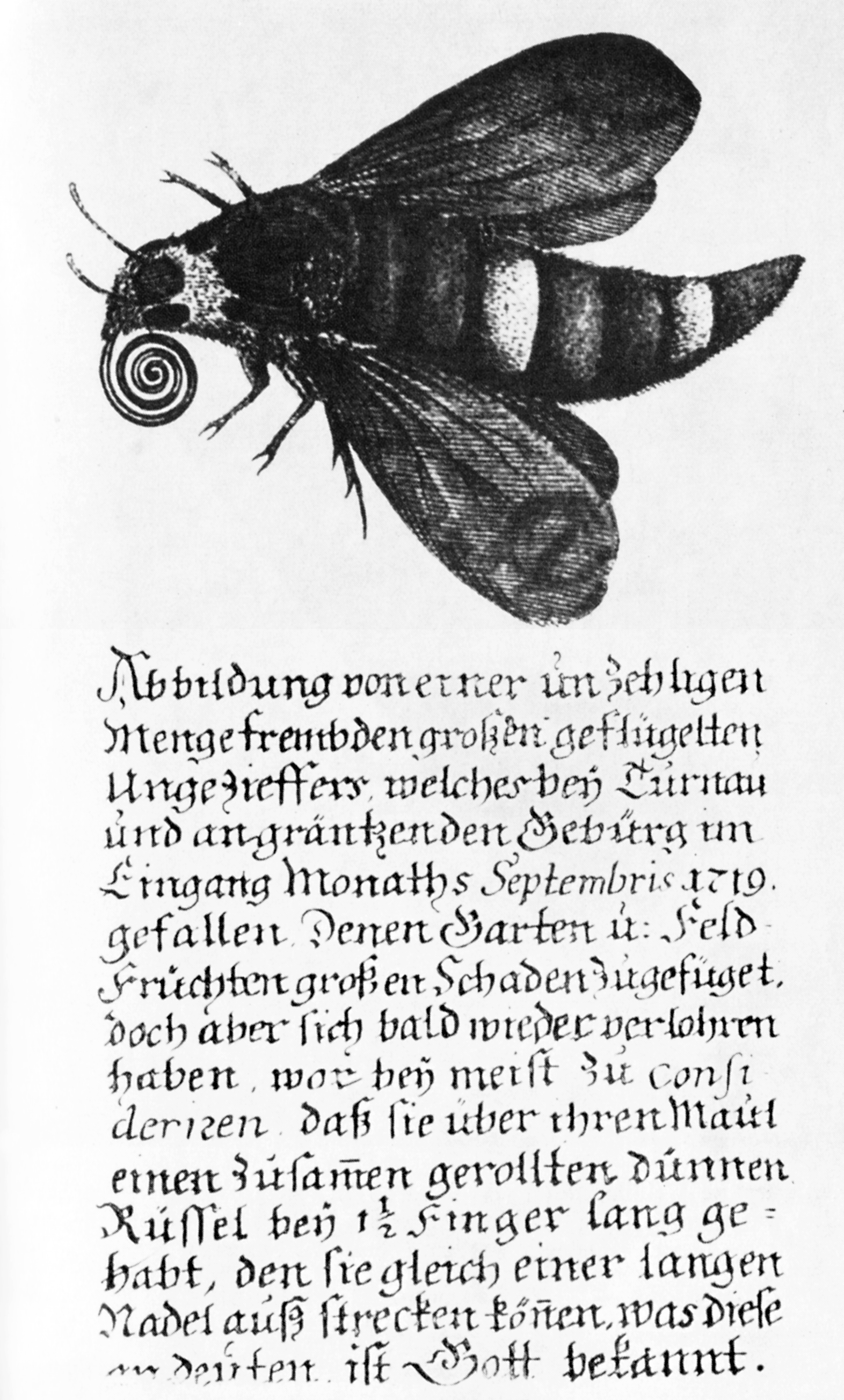
Record of a massive appearance of (presumably) Agrius convolvuli in 1719 near Turnau.

Butterflies (and to a lesser extent moths) migrating in large numbers are a noteworthy sight, which is easy to observe and track. There are several historic records about migrating butterflies. There are records dating back to 1100 about migrating butterflies (probably a Pieris species) from Bavaria to the Duchy of Saxony and from 1248 about the migration of yellow butterflies in Japan.

When flying at high altitudes, spotting migrating butterflies or moths can be hard. Low flying species are easily spotted or caught using a light trap. When individuals fly too high for these methods, air balloons equipped with nets are used at times. Alternatively, radar is used to monitor migration.

Another registration technique is marking the wings with tiny stickers, a technique comparable with bird ringing. This technique has not proven to be very successful though. Advances in technology might make it possible to equip individuals with micro transmitters in the future.

== Migration and climate change ==
Global warming has caused an increase of migratory butterflies and moths that reach north-western European countries like the Netherlands, Belgium and the United Kingdom. Research in the United Kingdom confirms that an increasing number of migrants reach the country. Because one would expect that migratory species can adapt to new circumstances quite well, the researches warn for new species that can have a negative impact on native species and possible damage to both health (species like the oak processionary) and agriculture.

== Effects of migration change and falling numbers ==
Changes in migration patterns can have serious implications for the surrounding environment. Butterflies are considered a keystone species; their residence in a habitat is a key indicator of the health of the ecosystem. Butterflies serve a multitude of purposes within an ecosystem including promoting genetic diversity through pollination and serving as a food source for many birds.

Agriculturally, butterflies are important pollinators and are responsible for pollinating many herbs are root vegetables. An estimated 90% of the food we consume is affected by pollination, and more directly, approximately 75% of flowering plants. The loss of butterflies could lead to a decline in agricultural production and quality of crops, as the pollination of crops via butterflies promotes genetic diversity which can help crops adapt to fight off new pests and diseases. Agricultural practices like using pesticides and grazing have negative impact on butterfly numbers.

A loss in butterflies also means a loss in biological wealth. Butterflies are known as the "flying flower' as they are beautiful and carry a large aesthetic value. Dwindling numbers and the following decline of ecosystems will lead to greater loss of biological wealth over time, as without pollinators many plants will not grow or bloom.

Many scientists have analyzed data, revealing that the Monarch butterfly population has declined significantly since the 1980s and the 1990s. The causes of the recent decline are lodging, falling trees, global warming, reduction of milkweed to breeding places, and the drought in areas butterflies roost. However, the biggest limiting factors to the species' is climate change. Warmer temperatures over time are changing weather patterns and disrupting the usual balance of nature. This poses many risks to human beings and all other forms of life on Earth.

Some examples of threatened or endangered American butterflies include:

- Karner Blue, they are most commonly found in the midwest and the cause of their decline is the loss of lupine plant.
- Palos Verdes, they are most commonly found in Los Angeles and their cause of decline is disruption of habitats by humans.
- Pawnee Montane Skipper, they are most commonly found in Colorado, their cause of decline is due to the destruction of habitat by humans .
- Oregon Silverspot, they are most commonly found in Oregon, their cause of decline is due to habitat loss.

The solutions are simple, the include but are not limited to educational material to educate young children, The Monarch Act of 2021, butterfly sanctuaries, limiting the use of pesticides and herbicides while farming, and planting the native milkweed.

- Butterflies
- Butterfly house (conservatory)
- Conservation biology
- Insect migration
- Monarch butterfly conservation in California
- Monarch butterfly migration
- Hummingbird hawk-moth
