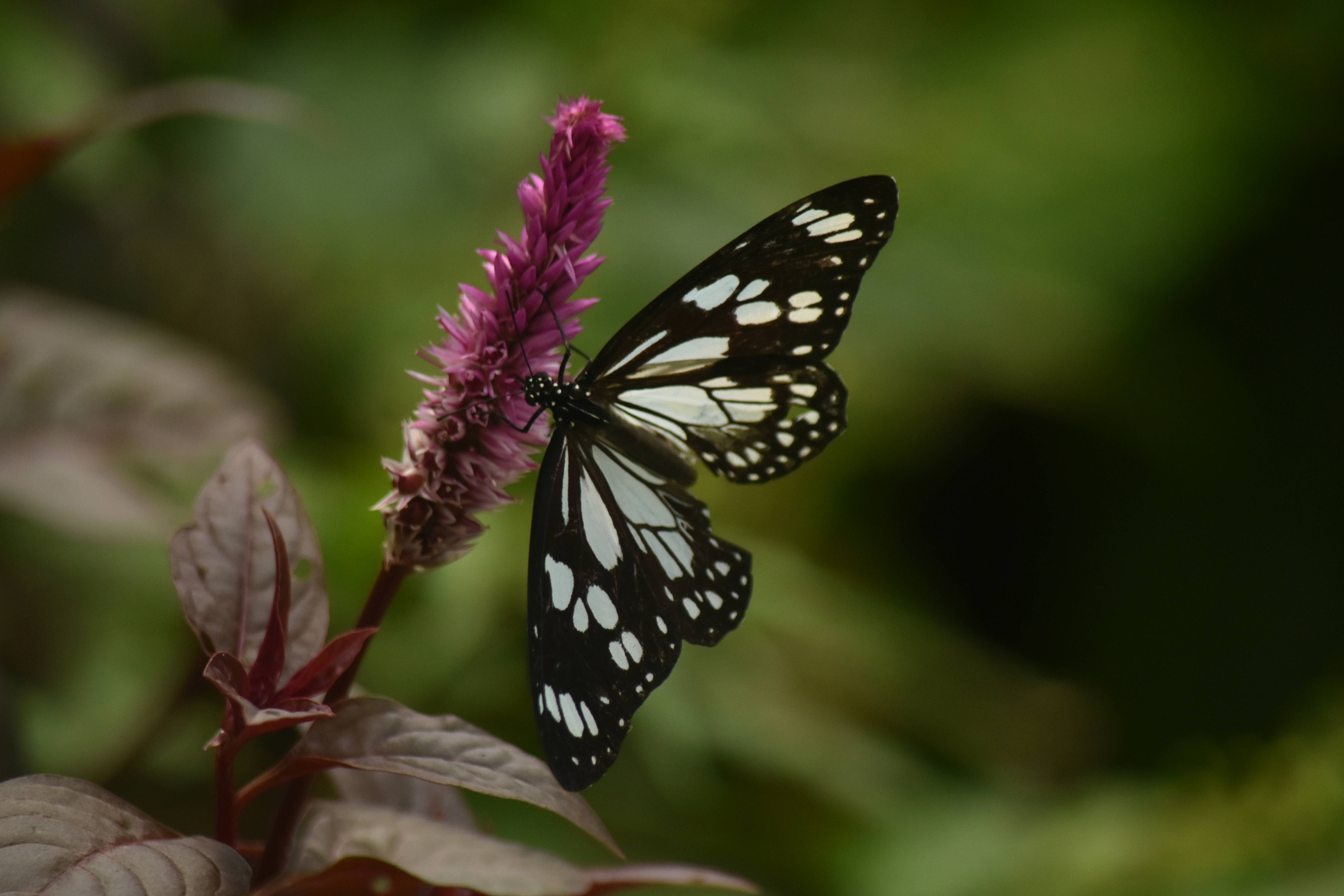
- Datu Odin Sinsuat, Maguindanao del Norte, Philippines

Scientific classification
- Kingdom: Animalia
- Phylum: Arthropoda
- Clade: Pancrustacea
- Class: Insecta
- Order: Lepidoptera
- Family: Nymphalidae
- Genus: Tirumala
- Species: T. tumanana

Binomial name
- Tirumala tumanana Semper, 1886

= Tirumala tumanana =

Species of butterfly

Tirumala tumanana is a butterfly species within the Danainae subfamily of the family Nymphalidae. The butterfly is found in the southern Philippines, in Sarangani, Balut and Mindanao. It was first described by Georg Semper in 1886. Tirumala tumanana was originally considered a subspecies of Tirumala choaspes or Tirumala limniace due to morphological similarities, but a 2012 study has established that it is a distinct species.

== Description ==
The forewings feature a subapical band composed of three bluish-white spots, and the underside of the wings is dark. The phallus of T. tumanana is wide from base to apex, with a curve near the apex and a linear series outgrowths resembling thorns.

== Distribution and habitat ==
Tirumala tumanana is endemic to the southern Philippines, where it inhabits forested areas at altitudes ranging from 350 to 1,900 meters. It is primarily found in the provinces of South Cotabato and Davao del Sur, including the T'boli region. Additionally, it occurs on the islands of Sarangani and Balut. There are also historical records from Dapitan in the Zamboanga Peninsula, suggesting that the species may have once had a broader range.

== Conservation status ==
The IUCN currently lists Tirumala tumanana as Vulnerable.

== Taxonomy and systematics ==
Tirumala tumanana was originally described as a distinct species by Georg Semper in 1886. Over the years, it was downgraded to a subspecies of Tirumala choaspes or Tirumala limniace. However, after a 2012 morphological and molecular study examining the male genitalia and wings, T. tumanana has been reinstated as a distinct species.
