= Tirumala alba =

Conservation status
- Data Deficient (IUCN 2.3)

Scientific classification
- Kingdom: Animalia
- Phylum: Arthropoda
- Clade: Pancrustacea
- Class: Insecta
- Order: Lepidoptera
- Family: Nymphalidae
- Genus: Tirumala
- Species: T. alba

Binomial name
- Tirumala alba Chou & Gu, 1994

Species of butterfly

Tirumala alba is a species of nymphalid butterfly in the Danainae subfamily. It is endemic to Hainan, China.
