= Crow tiger =

Conservation status
- Vulnerable (IUCN 2.3)

Scientific classification
- Kingdom: Animalia
- Phylum: Arthropoda
- Clade: Pancrustacea
- Class: Insecta
- Order: Lepidoptera
- Family: Nymphalidae
- Genus: Tirumala
- Species: T. euploeomorpha

Binomial name
- Tirumala euploeomorpha (Howarth, Kawazoé & Sibatani, 1976)

Species of butterfly

The crow tiger (Tirumala euploeomorpha) is a species of nymphalid butterfly in the Danainae subfamily. It is endemic to the Solomon Islands.

== Morphology ==
Male specimens of the crow tiger are dark shades of brown in color over the span of their entire body, mixed with some white markings on the "occiput, apex and surrounds of eyes", and a thin line of white on the thorax. It has lateral and ventral white markings on its body that are common within this group. It has a fore wing length of 40-44 mm, and its wings appear to have a white to dark brown gradient moving inward towards the body. The underside of the wings is quite similar to the above characteristics, but paler due to a lack of brown-colored clouding at the base of the veins in the wings.

No female specimens of this species have been morphologically described.

Examination of genitalia has revealed a close relation to D. (T.) hamata hamata.
