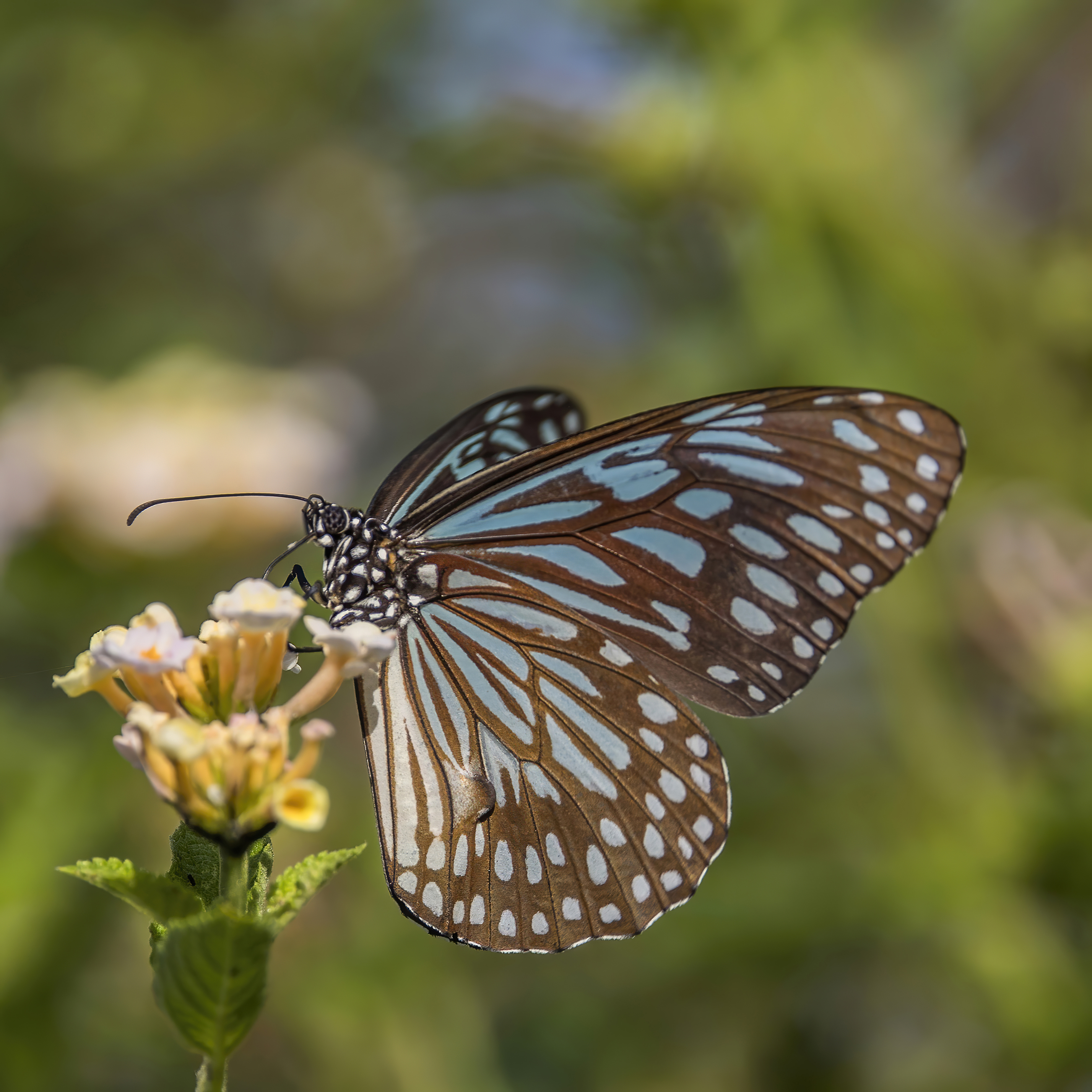
- male, Thailand

Conservation status
- Least Concern (IUCN 2.3)

Scientific classification
- Domain: Eukaryota
- Kingdom: Animalia
- Phylum: Arthropoda
- Class: Insecta
- Order: Lepidoptera
- Family: Nymphalidae
- Genus: Tirumala
- Species: T. gautama

Binomial name
- Tirumala gautama (Moore, 1877)

= Tirumala gautama =

Scarce blue tiger

Species of butterfly

Tirumala gautama, the scarce blue tiger, is a butterfly species found in India and Southeast Asia that belongs to the "crows and tigers", that is, the danaid group of the brush-footed butterflies family.

== Description ==
Upperside fuliginous black with semi-hyaline bluish-white streaks and spots. Forewing: a long narrow streak generally extended to spot beyond and a short curved broader upper streak in interspace 1; cell with two narrow streaks joined at base, and an irregular spot sometimes divided into three at apex, the upper of the two basal streaks generally extended to the apical spot; a curved discal series of streaks, broad and elongate in interspace 2, short, almost rectangular, in interspace 3, narrow and elongate in the interspaces to the costa; finally, an irregular, somewhat crooked subterminal row of spots and a terminal more regular series of dots. Hindwing: two streaks, joined at base in cell, with short, slender, detached streak between their apices; interspace 1b white; 1a, 1, 2 and 3 with two streaks, joined at base in each; 4 to 8 with single broad short streaks; beyond these, subterminal and terminal rows of spots. Underside similar, hyaline markings clearer. Antennae black; head and thorax black, spotted and streaked with bluish white; abdomen fuscous, ochraceous beneath. Male secondary sex-mark in form 1.

Race gautamoides (Nicobar Islands) smaller than gautama, Moore, with comparatively narrower wings. Forewing: upper streak in cell very short and ill-defined. Hindwing: streaks in cell much broader, the lower one with a projection in form of a hook or spur.
