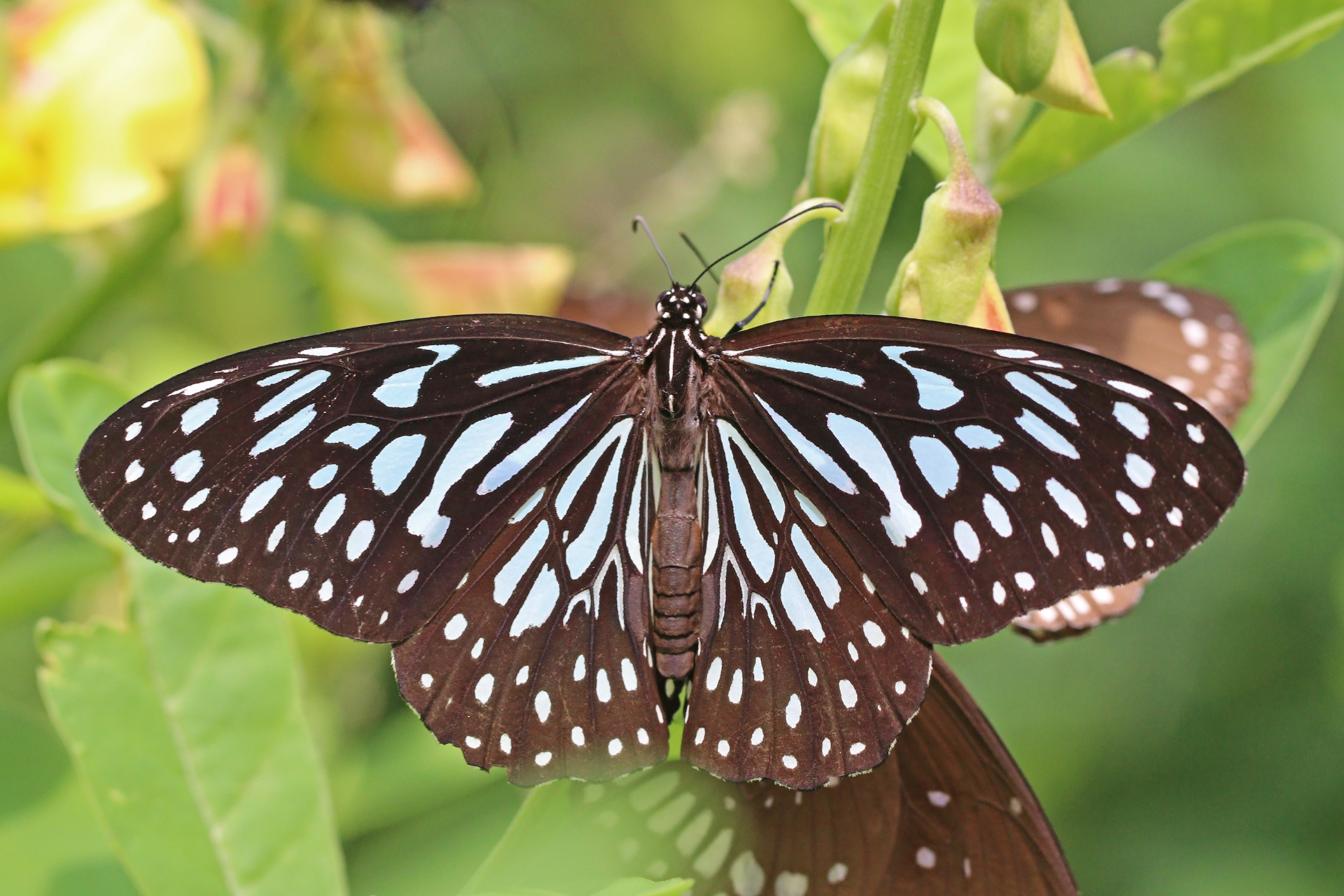

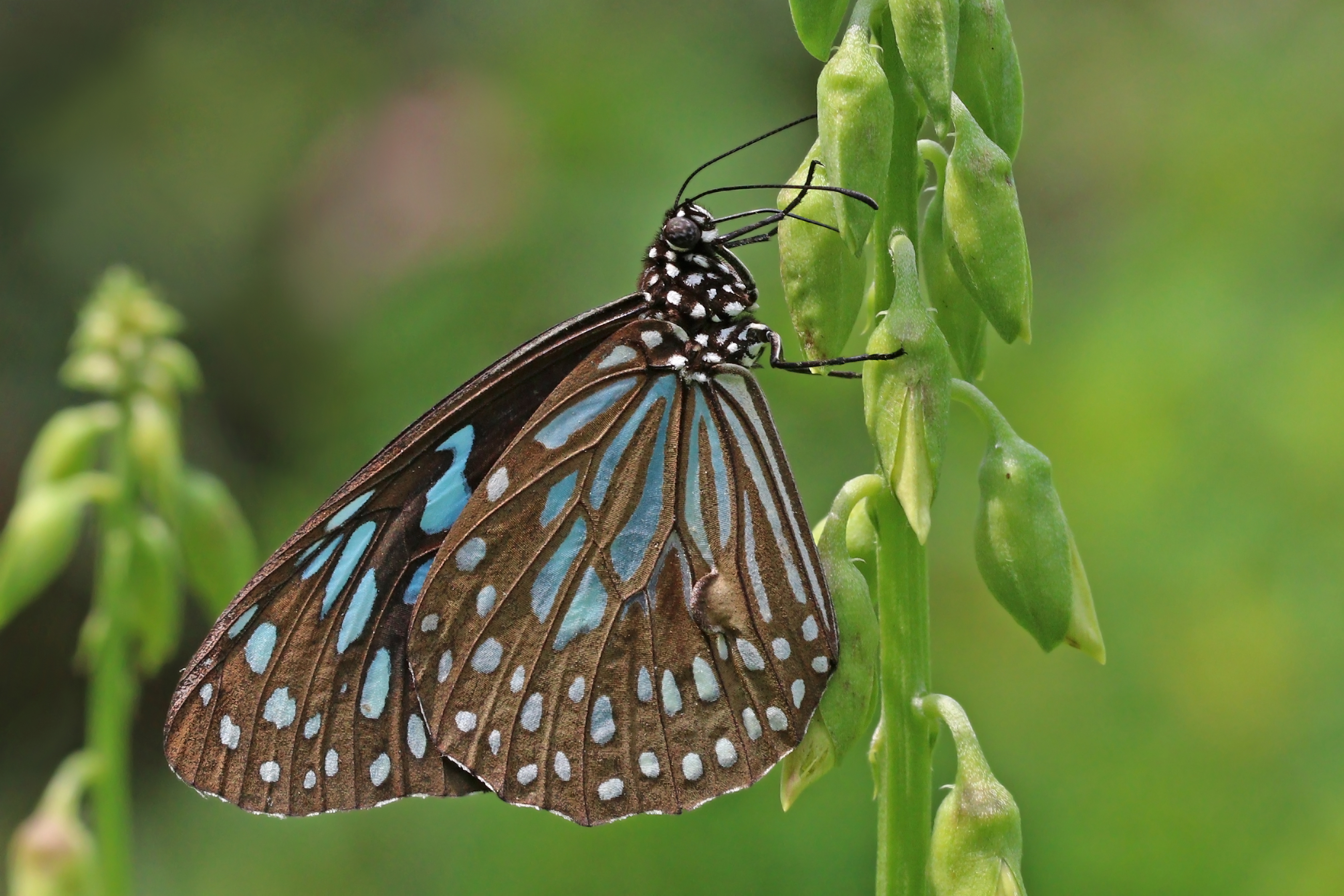
- Male underside both T. s. dravidarum Kerala, India

Scientific classification
- Kingdom: Animalia
- Phylum: Arthropoda
- Clade: Pancrustacea
- Class: Insecta
- Order: Lepidoptera
- Family: Nymphalidae
- Genus: Tirumala
- Species: T. septentrionis

Binomial name
- Tirumala septentrionis (Butler, 1874)

= Tirumala septentrionis =

Dark blue tiger

Species of butterfly

Tirumala septentrionis, the dark blue tiger, is a danaid butterfly found in the Indian subcontinent and Southeast Asia.

== Description ==
Tirumala septentrionis has a wingspan from 80–115 mm. The species closely resembles Tirumala limniace, but is sufficiently distinct to be easily recognized, even on the wing. Wings on any butterfly can show strong variations and genetics. For instance, the Dark Blue Tiger butterfly has a large wingspan because of the environment it grew up in, causing it to fly at large distances. Large sized wings were found in a low latitude area as well. Compared to T. limniace, its upperside is darker and the semihyaline markings are narrower, more distinct, and of a bluer tint. In the forewing, in interspace 1 the two streaks are narrower, never coalescent, and the upper streak forms an oval detached spot; the short streaks above vein 5 are outwardly never truncate, always acute. In the hindwing, the two streaks of the discoidal cell united at base are wide apart at their apices, with the lower streak never formed into a hook. On the underside, this species is generally darker, the apex of the forewing and the whole of the ground colour of the hindwing not being of the conspicuous golden brown that they are in T. limniace.

== Distribution ==
The Himalayas from Simla to Sikkim, into Assam, Myanmar, Cambodia and Southeast Asia; Odisha; West Bengal, southern India, the Western Ghats and Nilgiris; Sri Lanka.

== Habits ==
This species is one of the most dominant, making up 78% of the population during the migratory season in southern India, where many species undertake migration. Both males and females seem to migrate in equal proportions.

== Life cycle ==
Caterpillar is similar to that of T. limniace (see Journal of the Bombay Natural History Society x, 1896, p. 240). It is said by MacKinnon and de Nicéville to feed on Vallaris dichotoma (Journal of the Bombay Natural History Society xi, 1807, p. 212). Other species include Cosmostigma racemosa, Heterostemma brownii and Cocculus species.

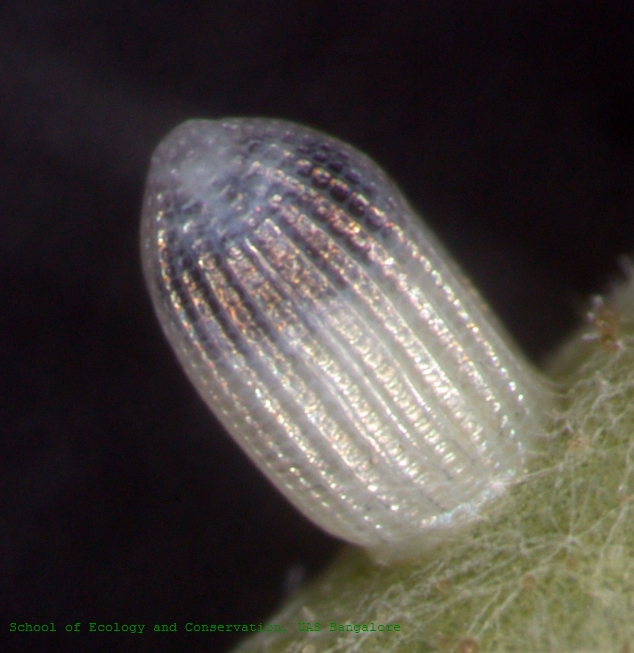
Egg

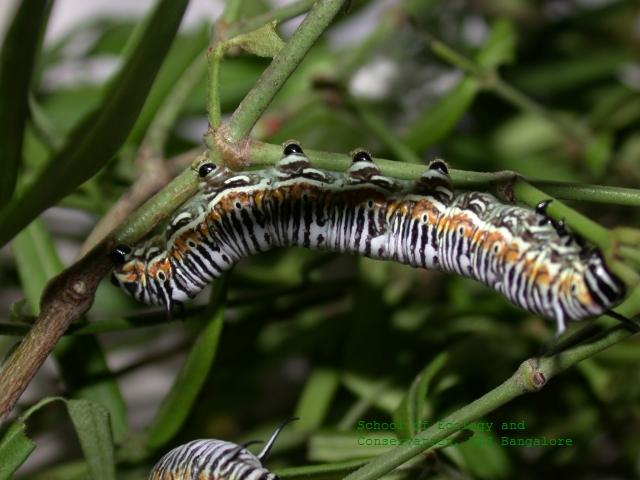
Caterpillar

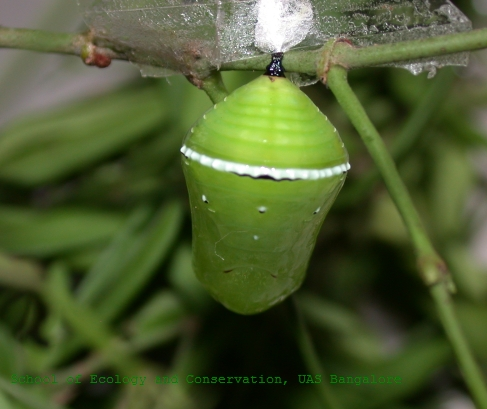
Pupa

== See also ==
- List of butterflies of India
- List of butterflies of India (Nymphalidae)
