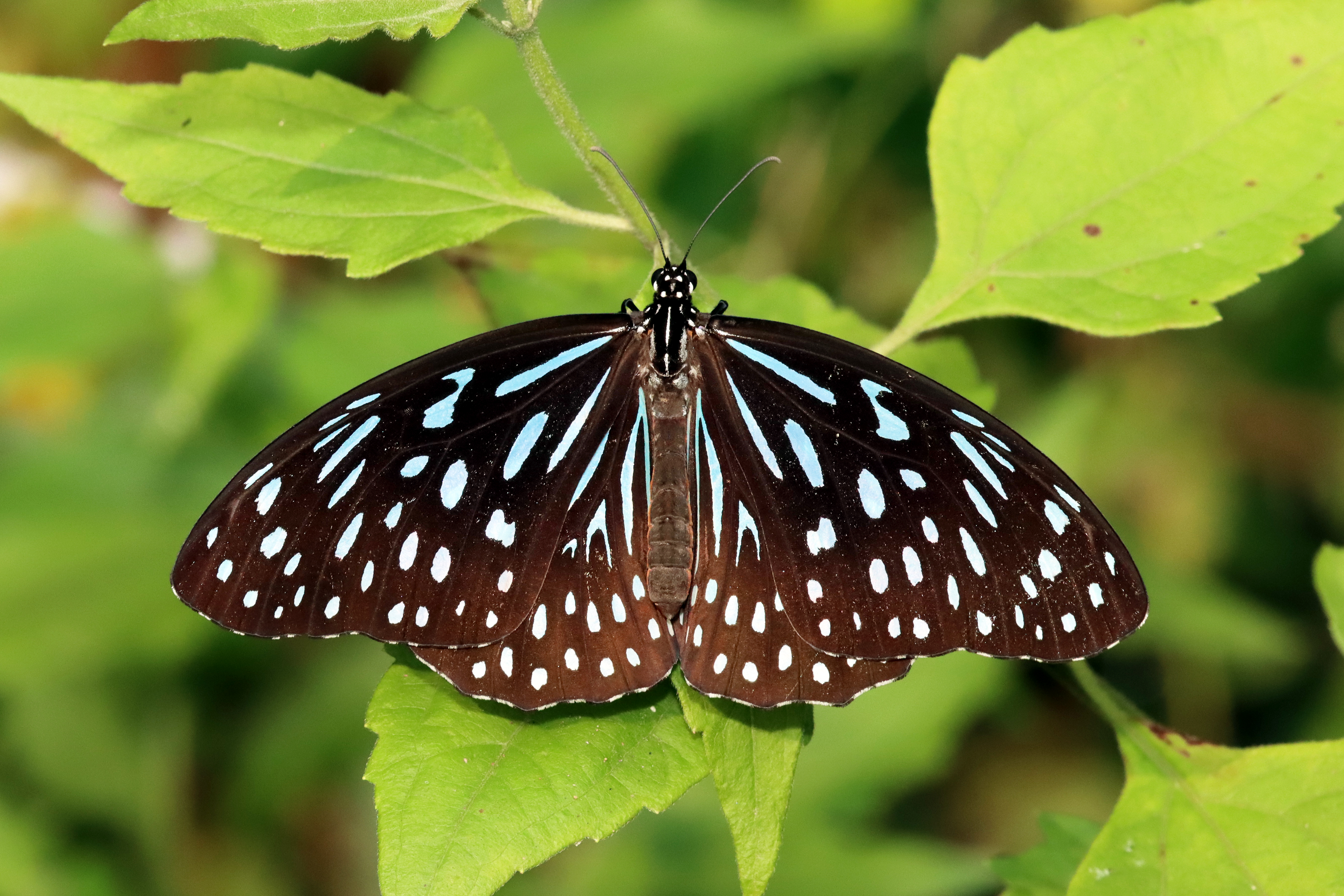
- Tirumala septentrionis
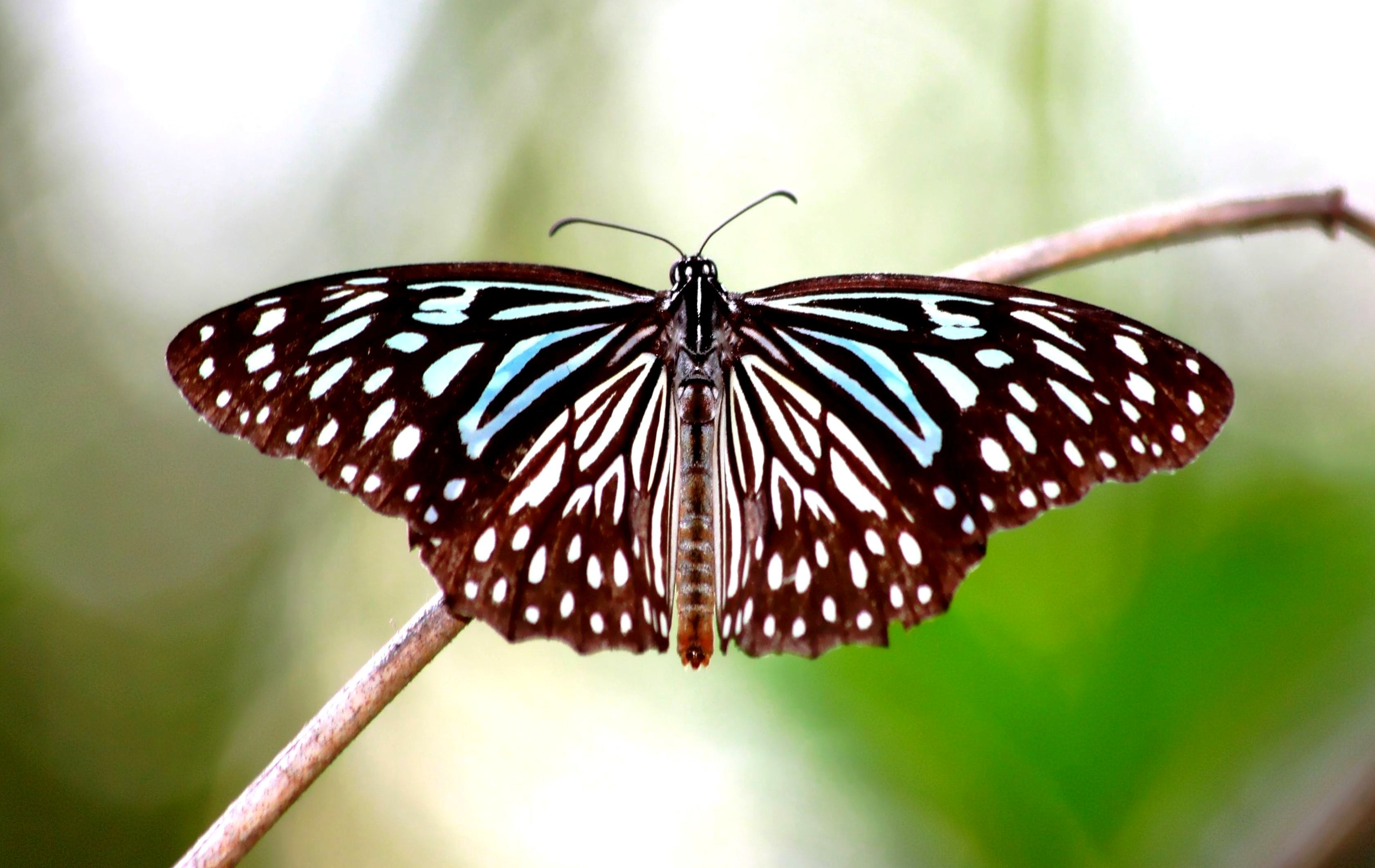
- Tirumala gautama

Scientific classification
- Kingdom: Animalia
- Phylum: Arthropoda
- Class: Insecta
- Order: Lepidoptera
- Family: Nymphalidae
- Subtribe: Danaina
- Genus: Tirumala; Moore, [1880]

Synonyms
- Melinda Moore, 1883; Elsa Honrath, 1892

= Tirumala (butterfly) =

Genus of butterflies

Tirumala is a genus of brush-footed butterflies erected by Frederic Moore in 1880. Its species are distributed in Africa, Asia, and Australia.

== Species ==
Butterfly	Caterpillar	Name	Common name	Distribution
		Tirumala formosa (Godman, 1880)	forest monarch	Cameroon, Ethiopia, Kenya and Tanzania
		Tirumala petiverana (Doubleday, [1847])	blue monarch	Zimbabwe.
		Tirumala gautama (Moore, 1877)	scarce blue tiger	India and Southeast Asia
		Tirumala euploeomorpha (Howarth, Kawazoé & Sibatani, 1976)	crow tiger	Solomon Islands.
		Tirumala choaspes (Butler, 1866)		Sula Islands
		Tirumala limniace (Cramer, [1775])	blue tiger	South Asia and Southeast Asia
		Tirumala septentrionis (Butler, 1874)	dark blue tiger	Sikkim, into Assam, Myanmar, Cambodia and Southeast Asia; Odisha; West Bengal, southern India, the Western Ghats and Nilgiris; Sri Lanka
		Tirumala hamata (MacLeay, 1826)	deep blue monarch, blue wanderer	the Philippines to Australia
		Tirumala ishmoides Moore, 1883		Visayan Islands, the Philippines
		Tirumala alba Chou & Gu, 1994		China.
