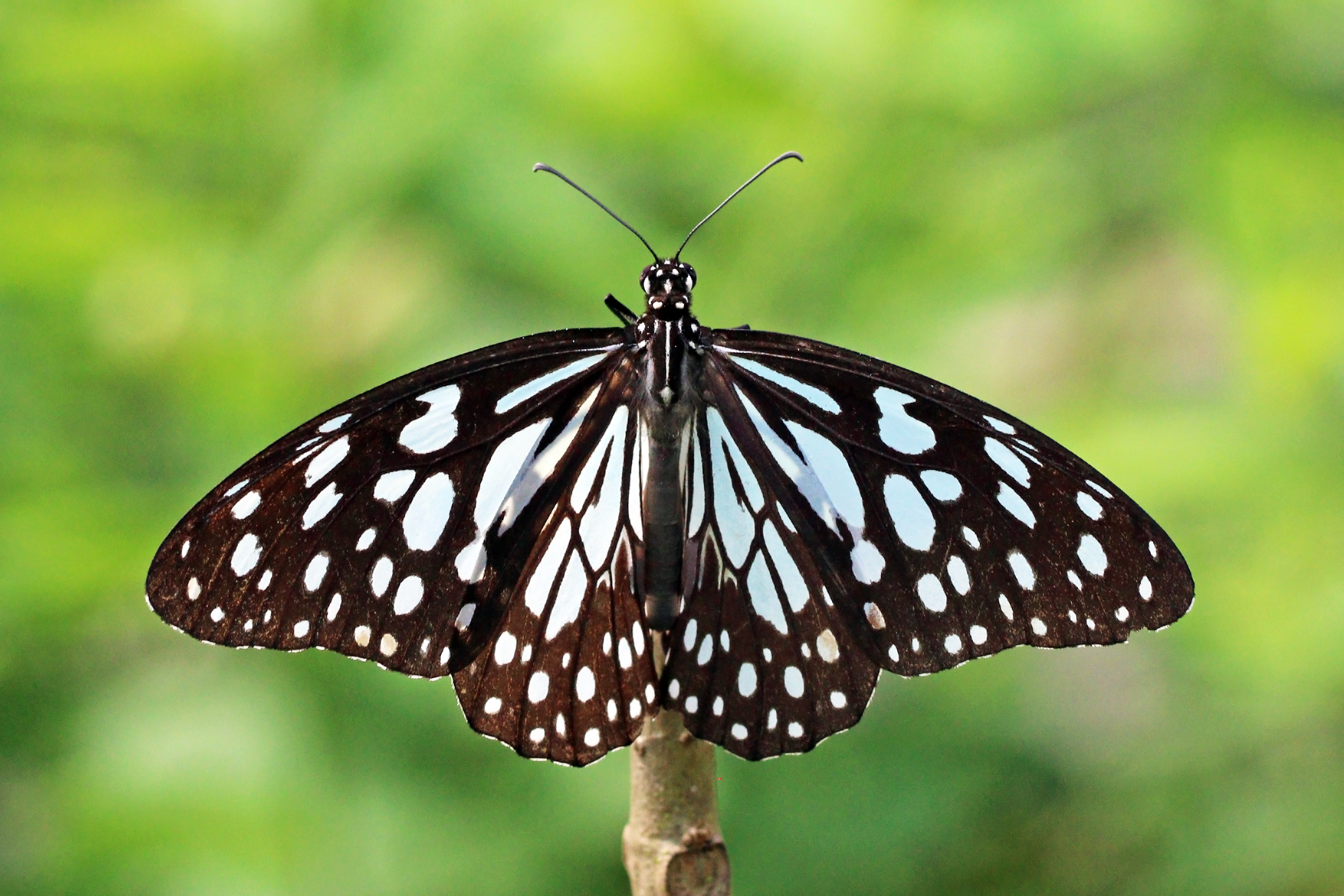

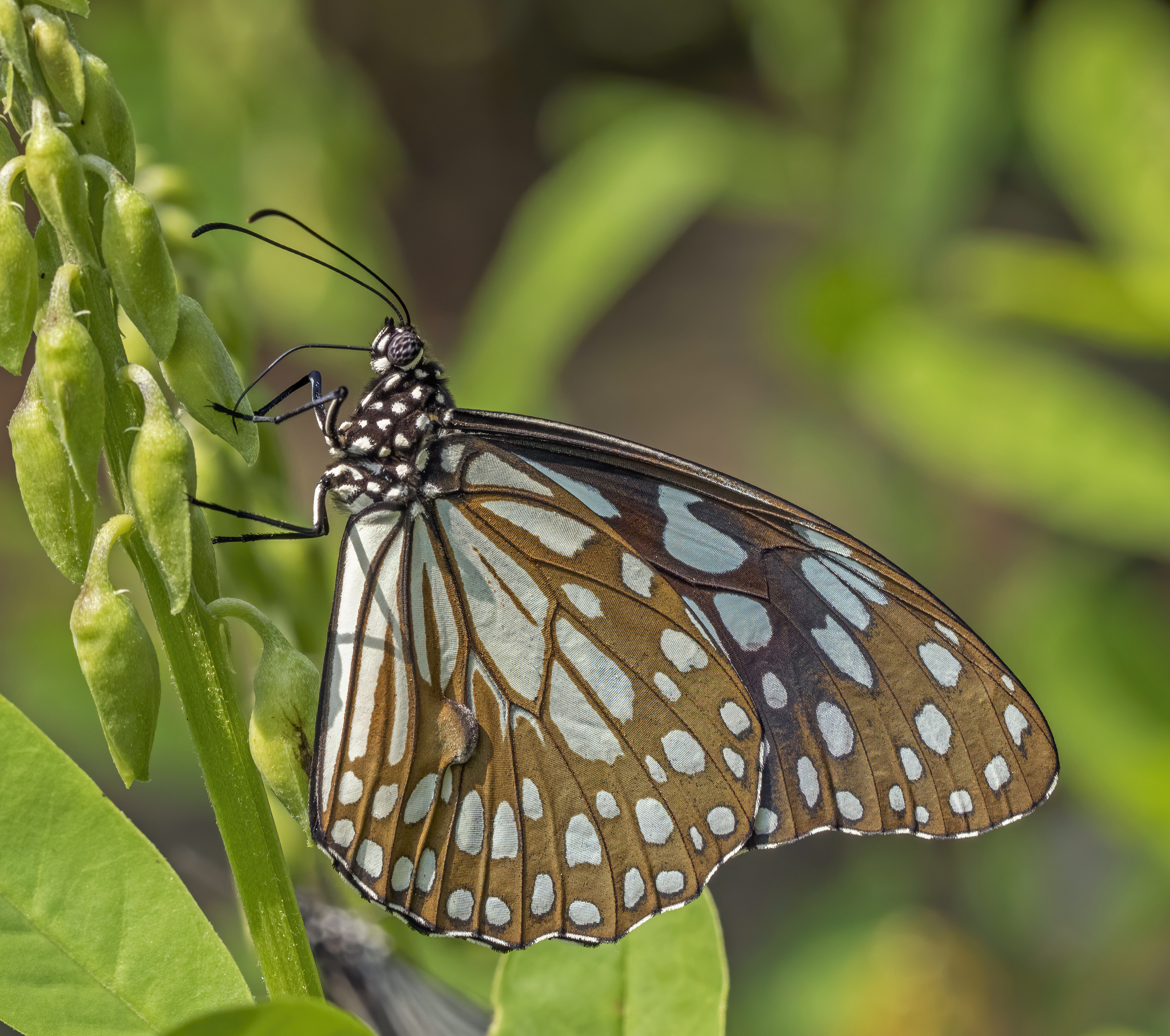
- Underside of male both in Kerala, India

Scientific classification
- Kingdom: Animalia
- Phylum: Arthropoda
- Class: Insecta
- Order: Lepidoptera
- Family: Nymphalidae
- Genus: Tirumala
- Species: T. limniace

Binomial name
- Tirumala limniace (Cramer, [1775])

Subspecies
- See text
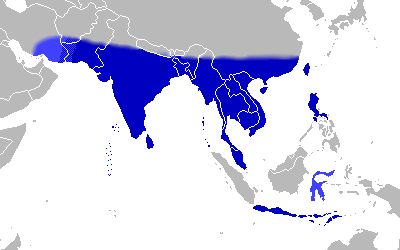

Synonyms
- Papilio limniace Cramer, [1775]; Danais limniace fruhstorferi van Eecke, 1915; Danaida limniace kuchingana Moulton, 1915

= Tirumala limniace =

Blue tiger

Species of butterfly from Asia

Tirumala limniace, the blue tiger, is a species of butterfly found in South Asia, and Southeast Asia that belongs to the brush-footed butterfly family, Nymphalidae. More specifically it is part of the crows and tigers or danaid group. This butterfly shows gregarious migratory behaviour in southern India. In some places, it may be found in congregations with Danaus genutia, Tirumala septentrionis, Euploea sylvester, Euploea core, Parantica aglea, and at high elevations, with Parantica nilgiriensis, on Crotalaria.

== Description ==
Tirumala limniace is a small butterfly with wide wings. It has a wingspan of 90 to 100 millimeters, with the males being smaller than the females. The upper side of the wing is dark brown to black and patterned with bluish-white, semi-transparent spots and lines. The blue of the bluish-white spots consists of the pigment pterobilin. In general, all butterflies can directly absorb heat from the sun via their wings to facilitate autonomous flight. Studies on blue tiger butterflies show that high-intensity light significantly increased flight activity. Blue tiger butterflies have a wing surface color that is composed of both light and dark colors. The dark areas on the wing surfaces are the heat absorption areas that allow for the facilitation of autonomous flight.

In cell 1b of the forewing, which, like all the others, is an area on the wing bounded by veins, run two strips, sometimes connected, after which there is a large spot. A stripe runs from the base of the discoid cell, followed by a large spot that is notched from the wing tip (apex). A large oval spot sits at the base of cell 2, a significantly smaller spot is at the base of cell 3, followed by a small spot. Five short stripes can be seen in the post-disk region on the leading edge, only two of which are clearly defined. Two rows of irregular points run submarginally, the inner ones being larger than the outer ones. There is a stripe in cell 1a on the hind wing. A strip that divides from the base also runs through cells 1b and 1c. In the discoid cell there is a wide dividing strip. The lower branch hooks or has a short spur-like base. At the base of cells 2 and 3 there is a thin, V-shaped arch. In cells 2 and 5 there is a strong, wide stripe at the base. Two rows of scattered, irregular points also run submarginally, the inner ones being larger than the outer ones.

The males differ from the females by a black pocket filled with scented scales in cell 1c, near the discoid cell on the upper side of the hind wings. The pockets are only created after hatching while the moth inflates its wings by turning up scented flakes. They play an important role in courtship, along with tufts of hair that can be turned out on the abdomen. The hairs sprout almost only from the rear third of the tuft of hair, a typical feature of the Danaini genera grouped under the clade Danaina.

The underside of the forewing is black, only the apex, like the underside of the hind wings, is olive-brown. The pattern largely corresponds to the top.

The antennae are black, as are the head and thorax, these two still bearing white dots and lines. The top of the abdomen is dark, the underside is pale brownish yellow colored with white shimmering underneath at the segment boundaries

== Life cycle ==
=== Food plants ===
The butterfly larvae generally feed on plants of family Asclepiadaceae. The recorded host plants are:

- Asclepias
- Calotropis
- Crotalaria spp.
- Epibaterium spp.
- Glycine max
- Heterostemma cuspidatum
- Hoya viridiflora
- Marsdenia tenacissima
- Wattakaka volubilis (syn. Drega volubilis)

=== Larva ===
Yellowish white; 3rd and 12th segments, each with a pair of fleshy filaments, black and greenish white; each of the segments with four transverse black bars, the second bar on all broader than the others, bifurcated laterally, a yellow longitudinal line on each side; head, feet and claspers spotted with black. The larva is around 1.21 centimetres (0.48 in) in length and weighs around 5 milligrams (0.077 gr) initially, but grows double that size and four times that weight within 48 hours.

=== Pupa ===
"Green with golden scattered spots and beaded dorsal crescent". (Frederic Moore quoted in Bingham)

== Range ==
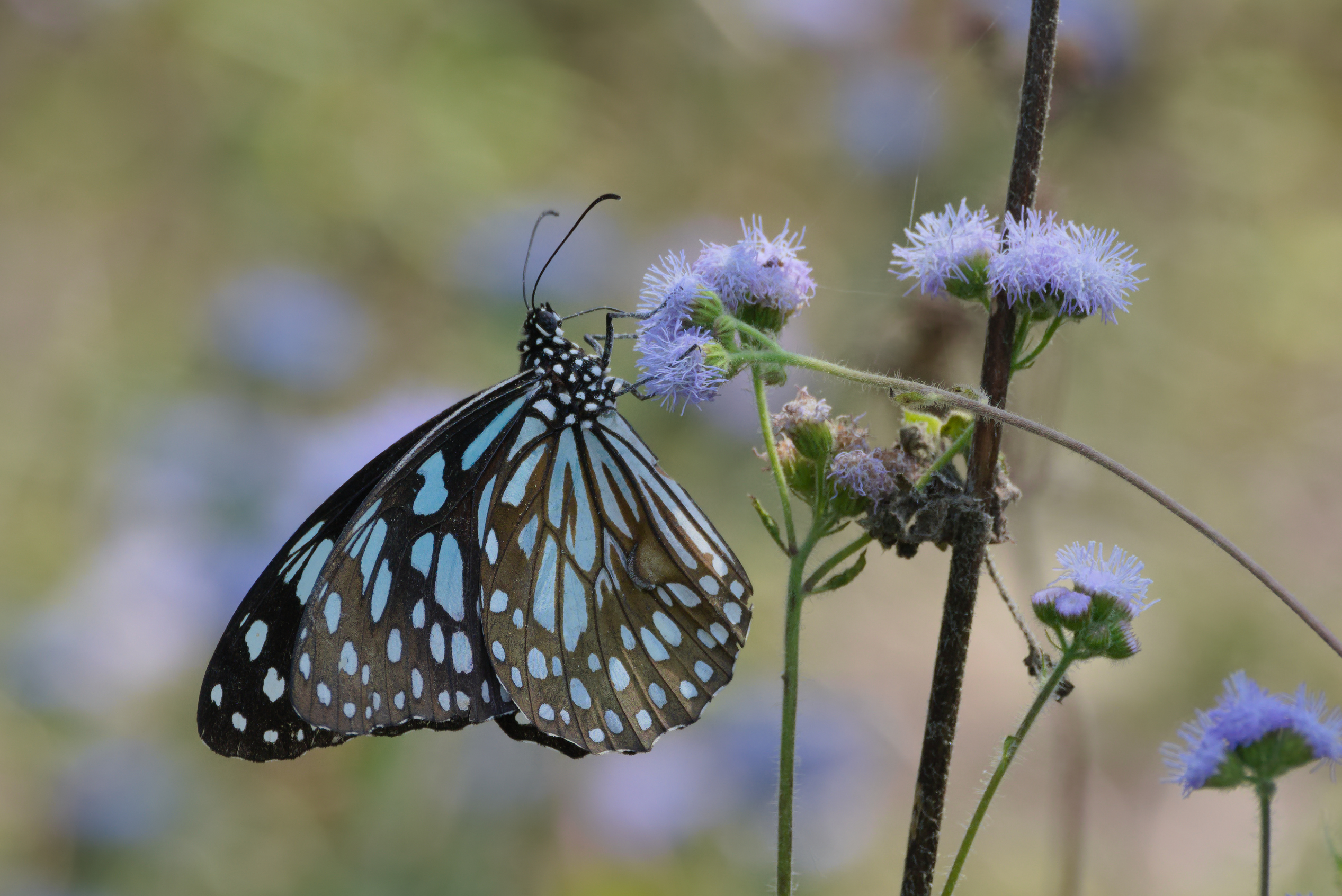
Blue tiger butterfly in Dehradun district, Uttarakhand, North India

The species is distributed in South Asia and Southeast Asia. In 2019, a single adult specimen was reported from the Balearic Islands, marking it the first record of the species in Europe.

== Subspecies ==
Listed alphabetically:

- T. l. bentenga (Martin, 1910) – Selajar
- T. l. conjuncta Moore, 1883 – Java, Bali, Kangean, Bawean, Lesser Sunda Islands
- T. l. exotica (Gmelin, 1790) – United Arab Emirates
- T. l. ino (Butler, 1871) – Sula
- T. l. leopardus (Butler, 1866) – Ceylon, India - southern Burma
- T. l. limniace (Cramer, [1775]) – southern China, Indochina, Hainan, Taiwan
- T. l. makassara (Martin, 1910) – southern Sulawesi
- T. l. orestilla (Fruhstorfer, 1910) – Philippines (Luzon)
- T. l. vaneeckeni (Bryk, 1937) – Timor, Wetar

== Habits ==
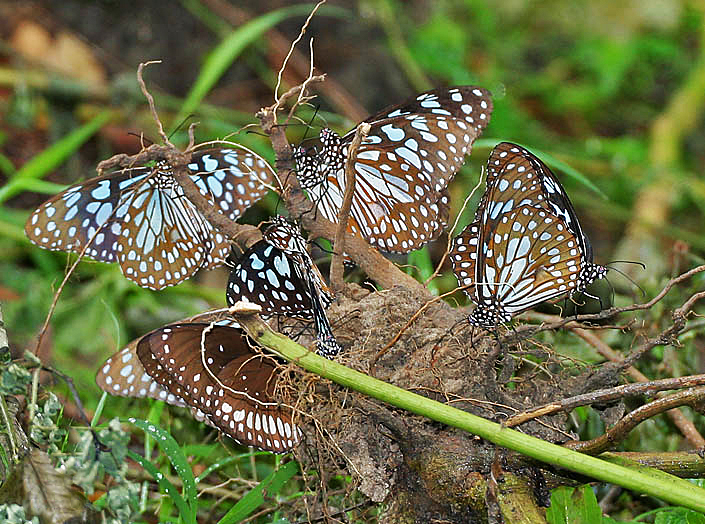
Blue Tigers congregating with a common crow butterfly in Kolkata, West Bengal, India

This species migrates extensively during the monsoons in southern India. The migratory populations have been observed to consist nearly entirely of males. It is also known to mud-puddle during migration.

== Gallery of life cycle ==
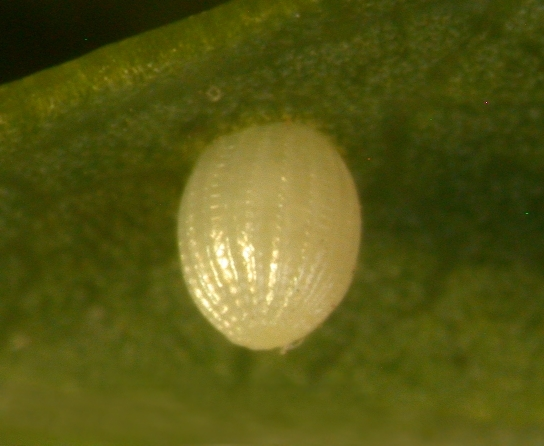
Egg

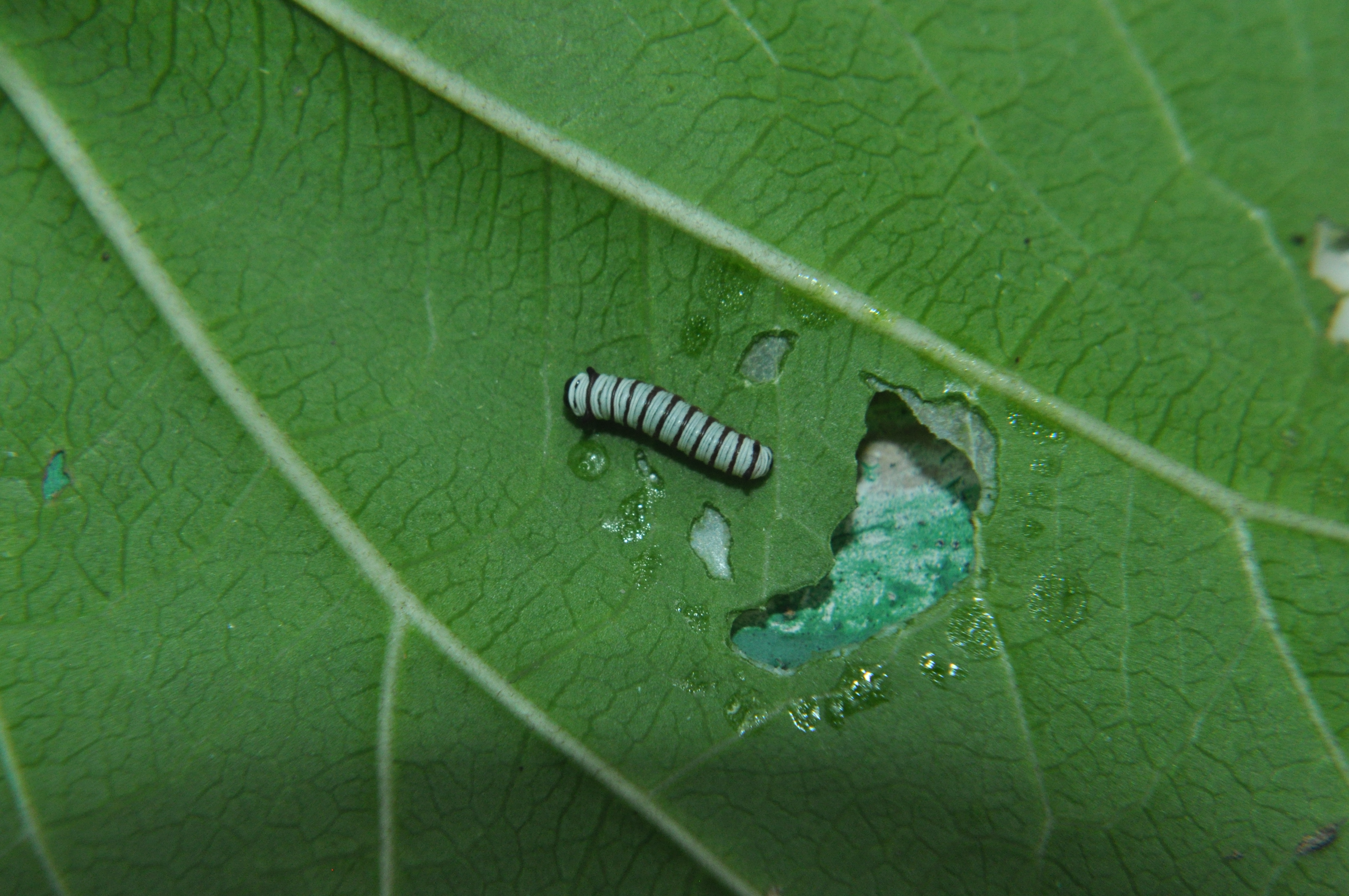
Larva (first instar)

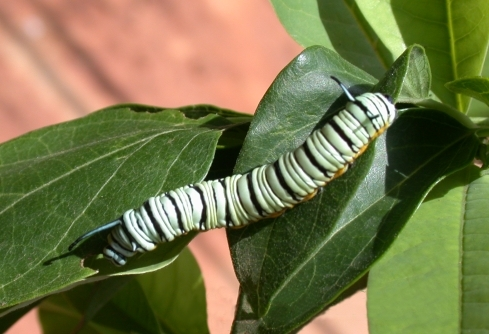
Larva

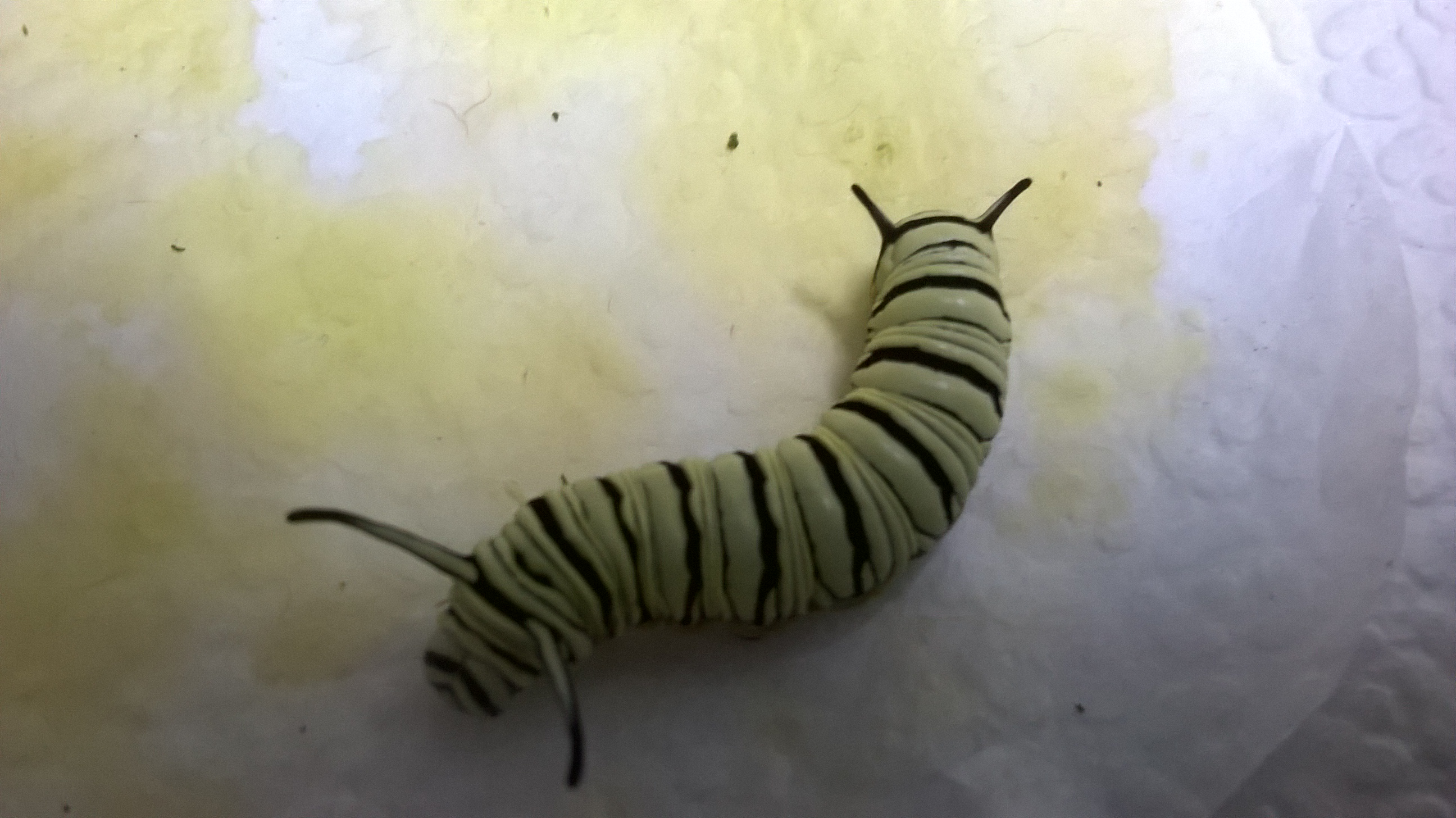
Larva (last instar)

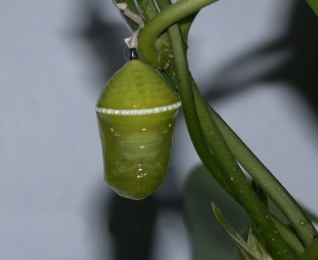
Pupa

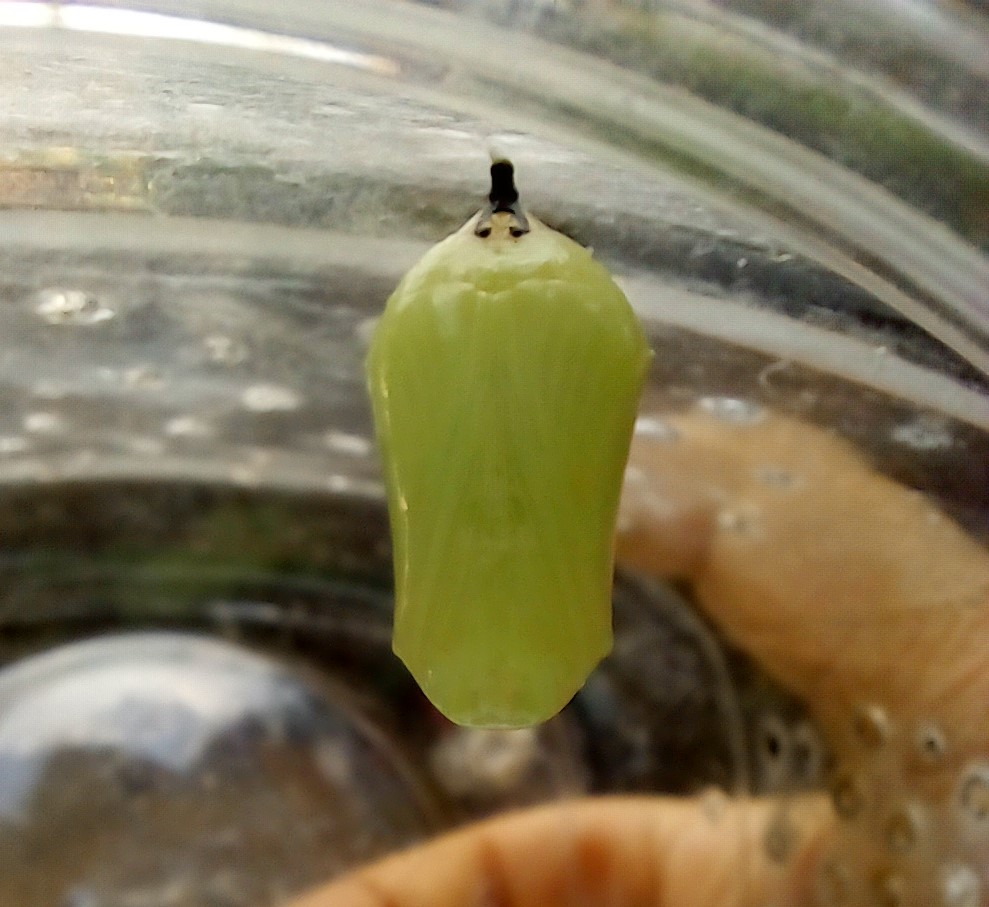
Pupa

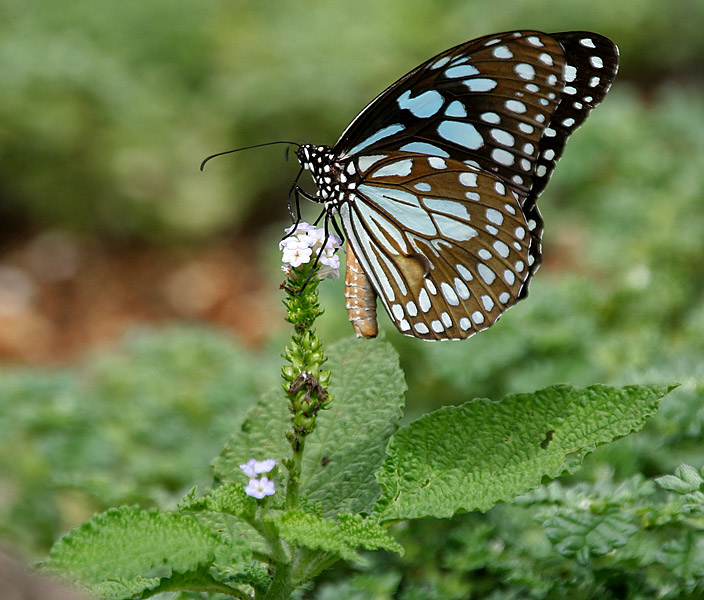
Imago on Indian turnsole (Heliotropium indicum) at Pocharam Lake, Andhra Pradesh, India

== See also ==
- List of butterflies of India
- List of butterflies of India (Nymphalidae)
