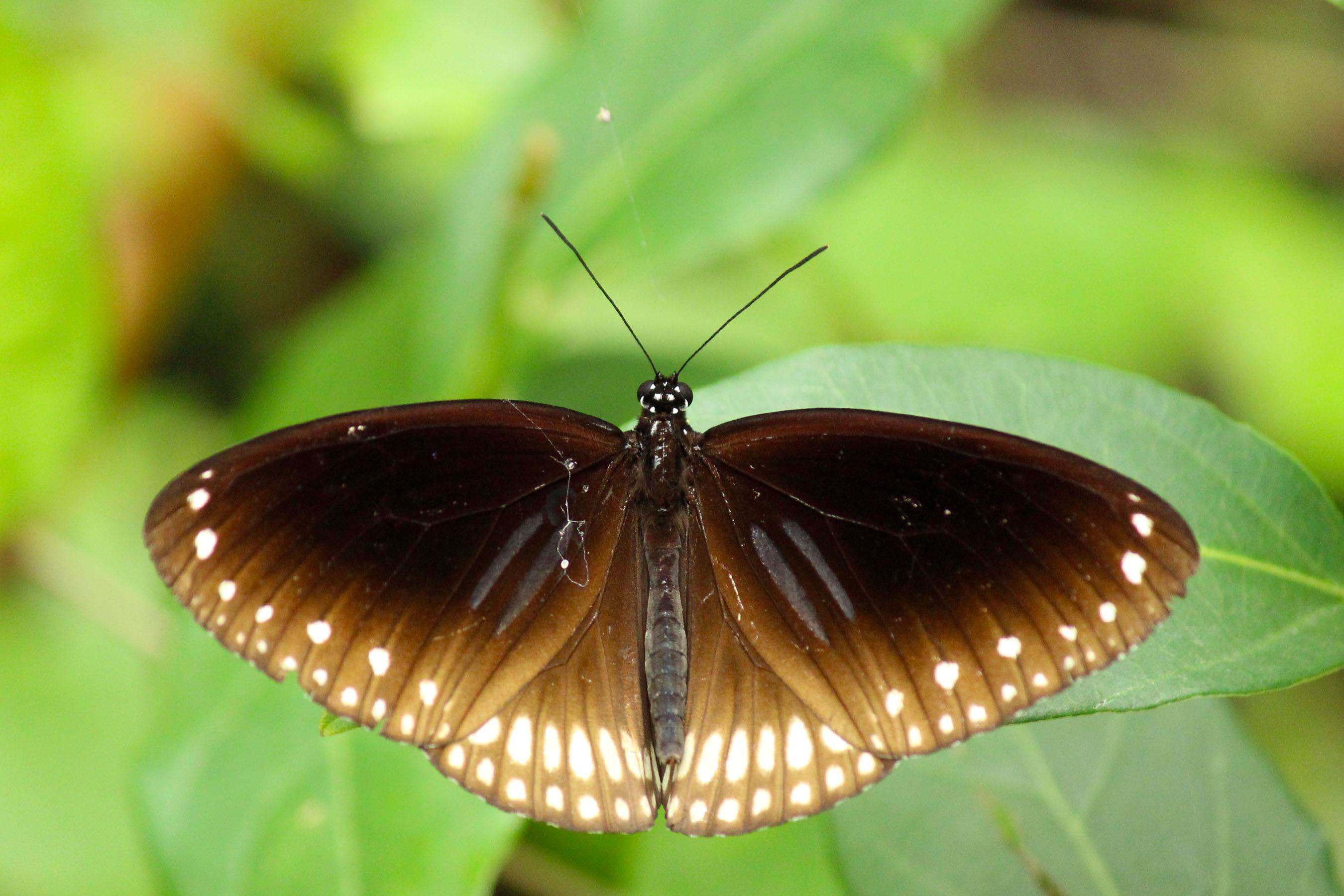

Scientific classification
- Kingdom: Animalia
- Phylum: Arthropoda
- Clade: Pancrustacea
- Class: Insecta
- Order: Lepidoptera
- Family: Nymphalidae
- Genus: Euploea
- Species: E. sylvester

Binomial name
- Euploea sylvester (Fabricius, 1793)

Synonyms
- Danais coreta Godart, 1819; Euploea coreoides Moore, 1877

= Euploea sylvester =

Double-branded crow

Species of butterfly

Euploea sylvester, the double-branded crow, also known as the two-brand crow in Australia, is a butterfly found in South Asia, Southeast Asia and parts of Australia that belongs to the crows and tigers, that is, the danaid group of the brush-footed butterflies family.

Several races of the butterfly are recognized. Race pelor is found in Australia.

== Subspecies ==
The subspecies of Euploea sylvester are:

- E. s. coreta (Godart, 1819) - India (South), Sri Lanka
- E. s. harrisii C. Felder & R. Felder, 1865 - Cambodia, Thailand, Laos, Vietnam, Malaysia (Peninsula), Singapore. [Myanmar?]
- E. s. hopei (C. Felder & R. Felder, 1865) - India (Sikkim, Assam) Myanmar, [Doubtful: Indo-China?, Peninsular Malaya?]
- E. s. pelor Doubleday, 1847 - Australia (Northern Territory, Western [Northwest])
- E. s. swinhoei Wallace, 1866 - Taiwan
- E. s. sylvester (Fabricius, 1793) - Australia (Queensland) "Cape York - Rockhampton, Torres Strait Islands".

== Description ==
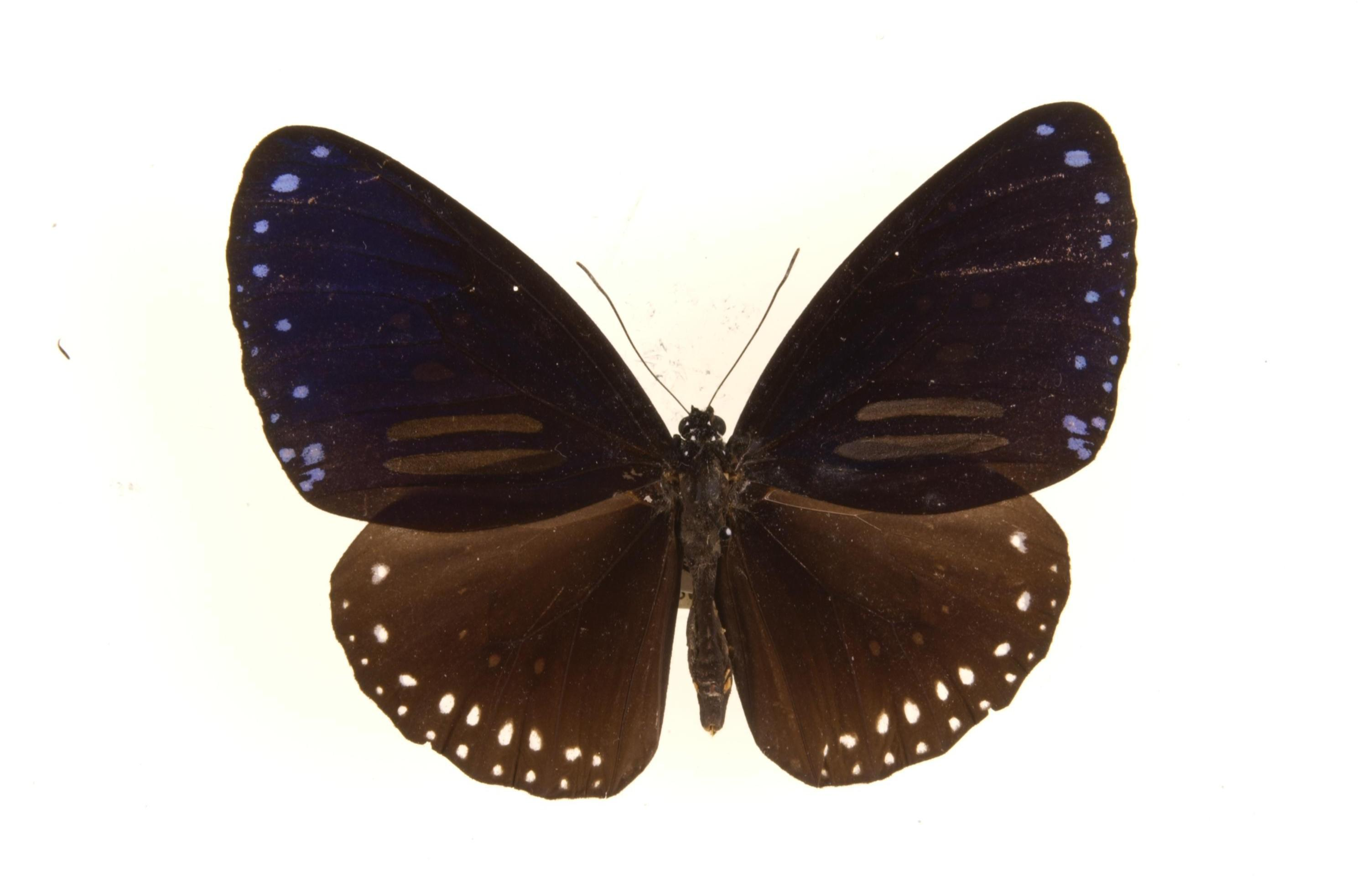
Museum specimen from Malaya

In shape, colour, and markings, it very closely resembles Euploea core. Males, however, can be distinguished at once by the presence of two brands instead of a single one on the forewing. Of the females Lionel de Nicéville says, females of E. coreta can be separated from the females of E. core by the following points: "First by the outline of the forewing being more entire; in core it is slightly but perceptibly scalloped- Second, by the underside of the forewing having a complete series of six spots, one between each pair of nervules outside the cell; in core two of these spots, those above the discoidal nervules (veins 5 and 6), are always wanting. Third, the two brands on the interno-median area (interspace 1) of the forewing in the male are faintly but quite perceptibly to be traced in the female in the same position."

== Larval food plants ==
The double-banded crow feeds on plants of the families Apocynaceae (dogbanes and oleanders) including Parsonsia, Hoya, and Cynanchum, Asclepiadaceae (milkweeds) including Marsdenia and Moraceae (figs) including Ficus obliqua, Ficus microcarpa, Ficus racemosa, Gymnema sylvestre and Ichnocarpus frutescens

== Gallery ==
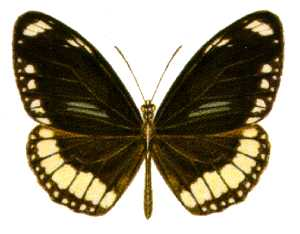
E. s. pelor In Australia

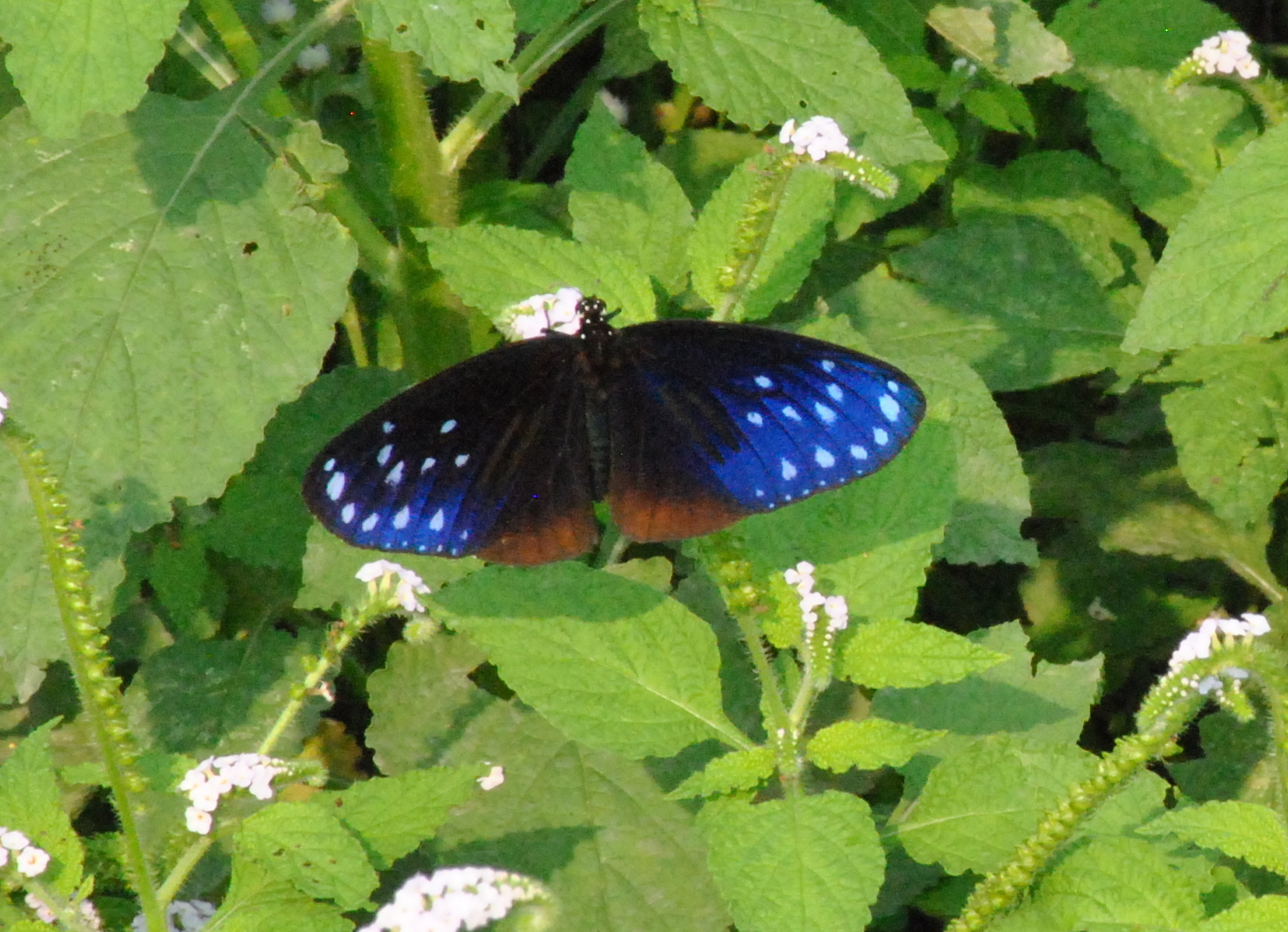
E. s. hopei In Buxa Tiger Reserve, West Bengal, India

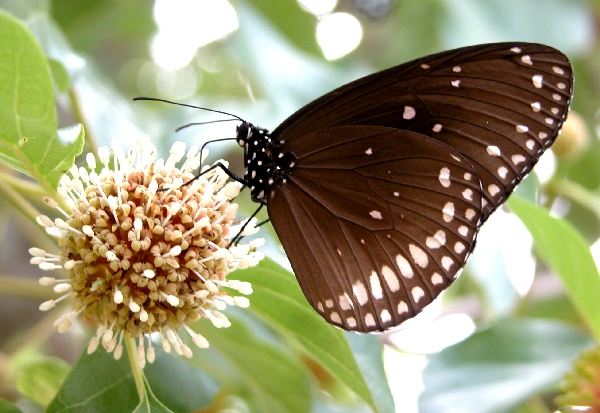
E. s. coreta In Bangalore, Karnataka, India

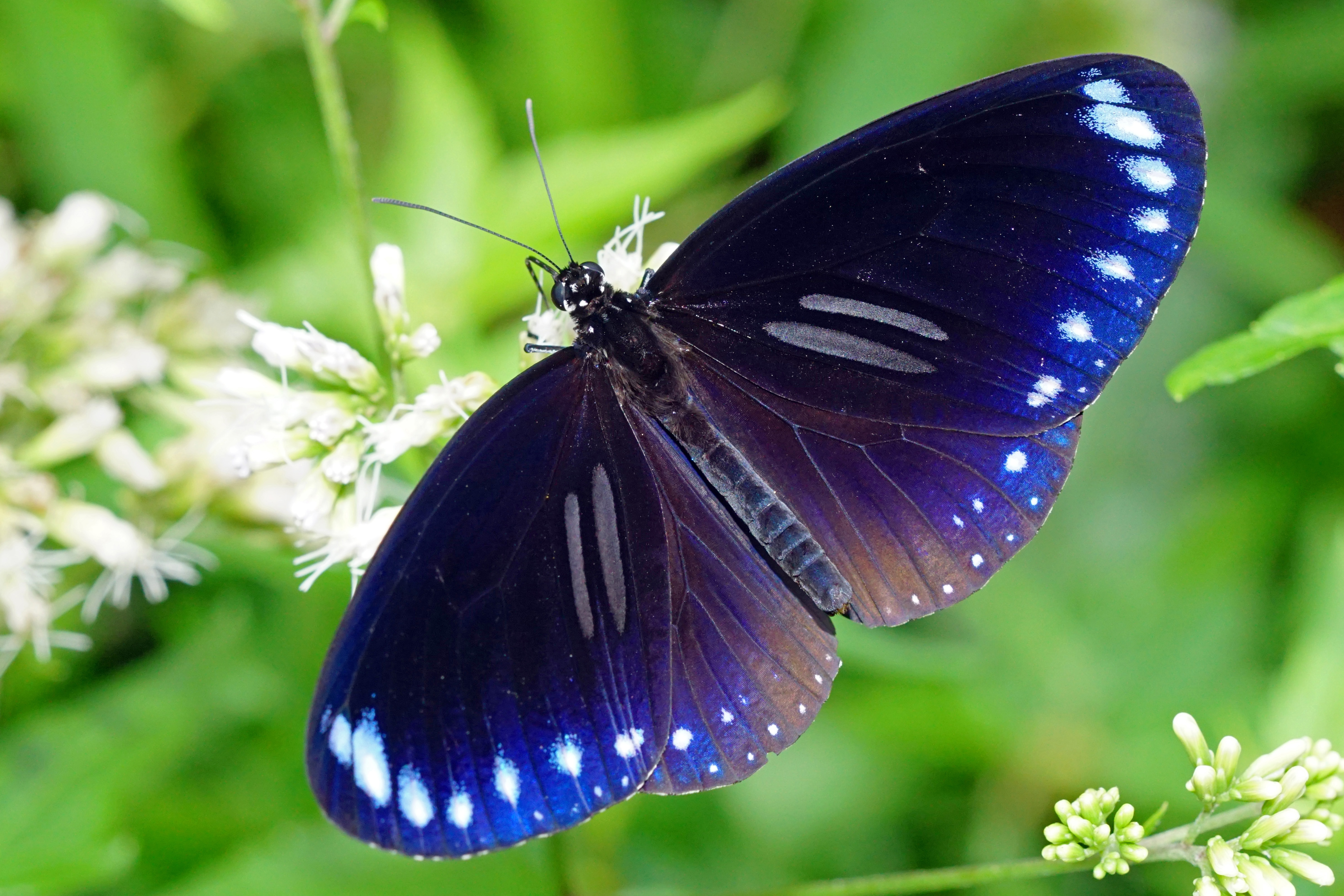
Male E. s. swinhoei in Taiwan

== See also ==
- Danainae
- Nymphalidae
- List of butterflies of India
- List of butterflies of India (Nymphalidae)
