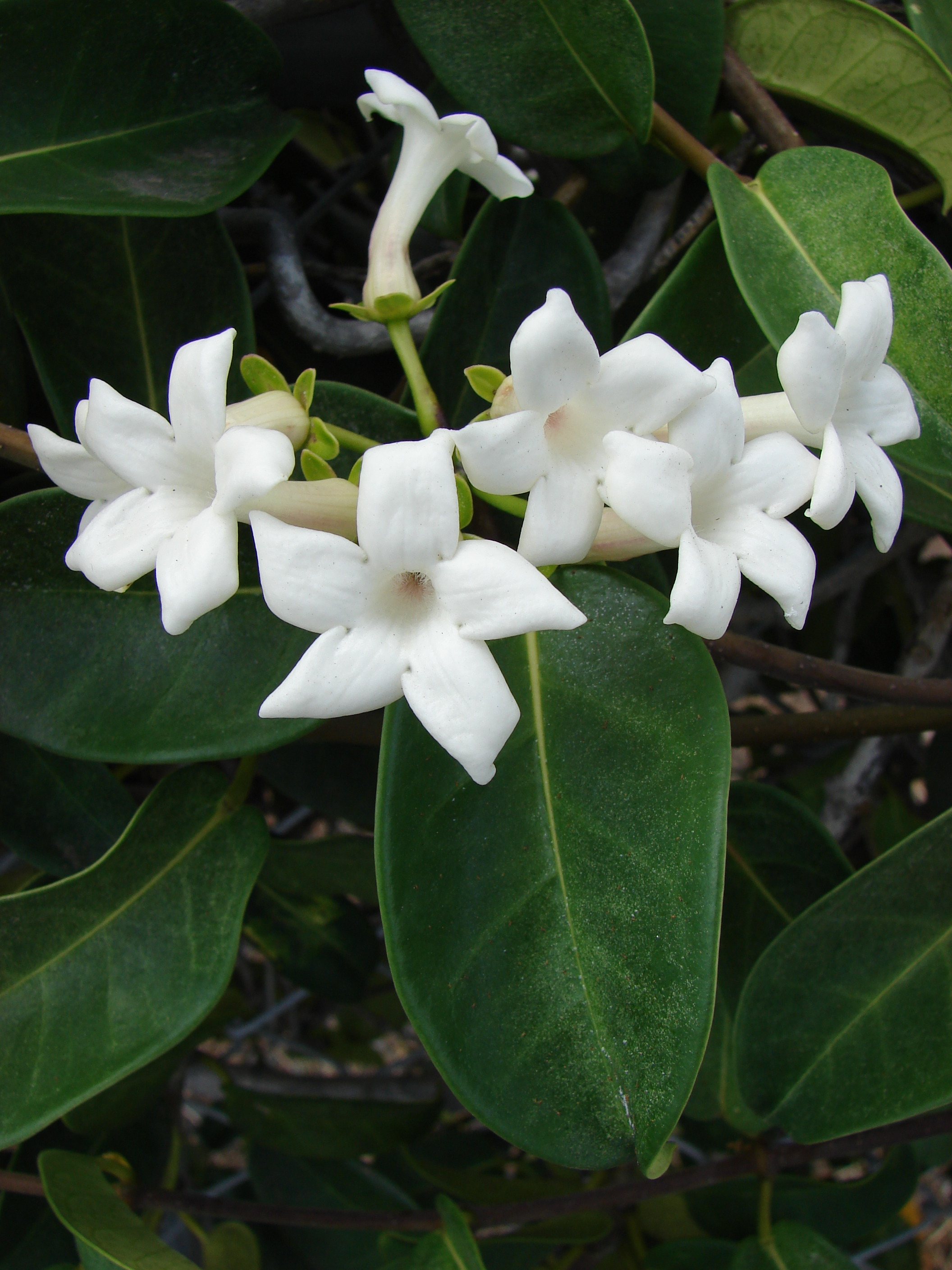
- Marsdenia floribunda

Scientific classification
- Kingdom: Plantae
- Clade: Tracheophytes
- Clade: Angiosperms
- Clade: Eudicots
- Clade: Asterids
- Order: Gentianales
- Family: Apocynaceae
- Subfamily: Asclepiadoideae
- Tribe: Marsdenieae
- Genus: Marsdenia; R.Br.

Type species
- Marsdenia tinctoria, nom. cons. R.Br.

Synonyms
- Conocalpis Bojer ex Decne.; Koelreuteria Medik., nom. illeg.

= Marsdenia =

Genus of plants

Marsdenia is a genus of plants in the family Apocynaceae first described as a genus in 1810. It is named in honor of the plant collector and Secretary of the Admiralty, William Marsden. The plants are native to tropical regions in Asia, Africa, Australia, and the Americas.

== Species ==
As of February 2026, Plants of the World Online accepted the following 69 species:

- Marsdenia brachyloba M.G.Gilbert & P.T.Li
- Marsdenia brunoniana Wight & Arn.
- Marsdenia burmanica Wen B.Xu & J.Y.Shen
- Marsdenia calcicola Kerr
- Marsdenia carnosa Lace
- Marsdenia celebica (Miq.) Boerl.
- Marsdenia chirindensis Goyder
- Marsdenia crocea (Zipp. ex Span.) Hook.f. ex Boerl.
- Marsdenia cryptostemma Choux
- Marsdenia cyanescens Costantin
- Marsdenia cynanchoides Schltr.
- Marsdenia elephantina Schltr.
- Marsdenia epedunculata Rodda
- Marsdenia eriocarpa Hook.f.
- Marsdenia eriocaulis Kerr
- Marsdenia formosana Masam.
- Marsdenia fulva Schltr.
- Marsdenia glabra Costantin
- Marsdenia glomerata Tsiang
- Marsdenia griffithii Hook.f.
- Marsdenia hainanensis Tsiang
- Marsdenia hamiltonii Wight
- Marsdenia iriomotensis Masam.
- Marsdenia jenkinsii Hook.f.
- Marsdenia kaniensis Schltr.
- Marsdenia klossii S.Moore
- Marsdenia koi Tsiang
- Marsdenia lachnostoma Benth.
- Marsdenia laurifolia (Decne.) Kloppenb.
- Marsdenia leiocarpa King & Prain
- Marsdenia lucida Edgew. ex Madden
- Marsdenia mahaweeensis Kloppenb.
- Marsdenia mayottae W.D.Stevens, Labat & F.Barthelat
- Marsdenia medogensis P.T.Li
- Marsdenia minima (P.I.Forst.) Schneidt, Liede & Meve
- Marsdenia mollis Schltr.
- Marsdenia oculata Schltr.
- Marsdenia officinalis Y.Tsiang & P.T.Li
- Marsdenia oreophila W.W.Sm.
- Marsdenia papuana Schltr.
- Marsdenia pergulariiformis Schltr.
- Marsdenia pierrei Costantin
- Marsdenia pseudotinctoria Tsiang
- Marsdenia pulchella Hand.-Mazz.
- Marsdenia purpurella Fernando & Rodda
- Marsdenia quadrialata Choux
- Marsdenia raziana Yogan. & Subr.
- Marsdenia rotata Schltr.
- Marsdenia roylei Wight
- Marsdenia sarcodantha Schltr.
- Marsdenia schneideri Tsiang
- Marsdenia scortechinii King & Gamble
- Marsdenia sinensis Hemsl.
- Marsdenia stenantha Hand.-Mazz.
- Marsdenia stenocentra Bakh.f.
- Marsdenia sultanis Schltr.
- Marsdenia taylorii Schltr. & Rendle
- Marsdenia tenii M.G.Gilbert & P.T.Li
- Marsdenia thailandica Rodda
- Marsdenia tinctoria R.Br.
- Marsdenia tirunelvelica A.N.Henry & Subr.
- Marsdenia tomentosa C.Morren & Decne.
- Marsdenia tonkinensis Costantin
- Marsdenia vohiborensis Choux
- Marsdenia warburgii Schltr.
- Marsdenia wariana Schltr.
- Marsdenia yarlungzangboensis C.Liu, J.D.Ya & Y.H.Tan
- Marsdenia yuei M.G.Gilbert & P.T.Li
- Marsdenia yunnanensis (H.Lév.) Woodson

=== Former species ===
Species transferred to other genera (such as Anisopus, Blepharodon, Cionura, Cynanchum, Dischidanthus, Dischidia, Gongronema, Gymnema, Jasminanthes, Leichhardtia, Lygisma, Matelea, Pergularia, Sarcolobus, Secamonopsis, Sinomarsdenia, Sinomenium, Stephanotis, Stigmatorhynchus, and Vincetoxicum) include:

- M. abyssinica, now Stephanotis abyssinica
- M. acuminata (Wall.) I.M.Turner, now Gymnema acuminatum
- M. acuminata (Brongn.) Choux, now Stephanotis acuminata
- M. acuta, now Sinomenium acutum
- M. angustifolia, now Lygisma angustifolia
- M. australis, now Leichhardtia australis
- M. batesii, now Anisopus mannii
- M. bicolor, now Matelea bicolor
- M. bicoronata, now Anisopus bicoronata
- M. billardieri, now Parsonia flexuosa
- M. brachystephana, now Sarcolobus brachystephanus
- M. brevifolia, now Gymnema brevifolium
- M. brunoniana, now Pergularia brunoniana
- M. calesiana, now Pergularia calesiana
- M. cinerascens, now Tylophora cinerascens
- M. clausa, now Pergularia clausa
- M. crinita, now Stephanotis crinita
- M. cundurango, now Ruehssia cundurango subsp. cundurango
- M. dissitiflora, now Gymnema dissitiflorum
- M. efulensis, now Anisopus efulensis
- M. elliptica, now Ruehssia elliptica
- M. erecta, now Cionura erecta
- M. ericoides, now Leichhardtia ericoides
- M. faulknerae, now Stephanotis faulknerae
- M. flavescens, now Leichhardtia flavescens
- M. gazensis, now Gongronemopsis gazense
- M. geminata, now Gymnema sylvestre
- M. glabriflora, now Gongronemopsis latifolia
- M. gracilis, now Blepharodon mucronatum
- M. grandiflora (Decne.) Choux 1923 not C.Norman 1929, now Stephanotis grandiflora
- M. hamiltonii, now Pergularia hamiltonii
- M. harmandiella, now Harmandiella cordifolia
- M. hirta, now Gymnema hirtum
- M. javanica, now Cynanchum javanicum
- M. incisa, now Sinomarsdenia incisa
- M. lactifera, now Gymnema lactiferum
- M. lanceolata, now Stephanotis volubilis
- M. leonensis, now Gongronemopsis latifolia
- M. leptophylla, now Leichhardtia viridiflora subsp. viridiflora
- M. littoralis, now Gymnema littorale
- M. lloydii, now Leichhardtia lloydii
- M. longiflora, now Stephanotis longiflora
- M. mackeeorum, now Leichhardtia mackeeorum
- M. madagascariensis, now Secamonopsis madagascariensis
- M. matudae, now Cynanchum peraffine
- M. muelleri, now Gymnema muelleri
- M. neriifolia, now Blepharodon gomphocarpoides
- M. obscura, now Gongronema obscurum
- M. parasita, now Dischidia parasita
- M. picta, now Blepharodon pictum
- M. pilosa, now Jasminanthes pilosa
- M. pleiadenia, now Gymnema pleiadenium
- M. racemosa, now Gongronema latifolium
- M. rhynchogyna, now Anisopus mannii
- M. rostrata, now Pergularia rostrata
- M. rostrata var. dunnii, now Gymnema dunnii
- M. rostrifera, now Anisopus rostrifera
- M. schimperi, now Stephanotis schimperi
- M. stelostigma, now Stephanotis stelostigma
- M. suaveolens, now Leichhardtia suaveolens
- M. suborbicularis, now Gymnema suborbiculare
- M. sylvestris, now Gymnema sylvestre
- M. syringifolia, now Gymnema syringifolium
- M. taylorii, now Gongronema taylorii
- M. thouarsii, now Stephanotis thouarsii
- M. tikalana, now Gonolobus glaberrimus
- M. tricholepis, now Gymnema tricholepis
- M. trinervis, now Gymnema trinerve
- M. tubulosa, now Leichhardtia tubulosa
- M. umbellifera, now Stigmatorhynchus umbelliferus
- M. urceolata, now Dischidanthus urceolatus
- M. velutina, now Tylophora velutina
- M. vincaeflora, now Stephanotis vincaeflora
- M. viridiflora, now Pergularia viridiflora
- M. volubilis, now Stephanotis volubilis
- M. woodburyana, now Ruehssia woodburyana
