= Secamonopsis microphylla =

Scientific classification
- Kingdom: Plantae
- Clade: Tracheophytes
- Clade: Angiosperms
- Clade: Eudicots
- Clade: Asterids
- Order: Gentianales
- Family: Apocynaceae
- Genus: Secamonopsis
- Species: S. microphylla

Binomial name
- Secamonopsis microphylla Civeyrel & Klack.

Species of herb

Secamonopsis microphylla is a plant species endemic to southern Madagascar. It is a trailing or erect herb up to 1.5 m tall. Leaves are narrowly oblong, up to 10 mm long. Flowers in groups of 1–3, yellow, tubular, up to 1.2 mm long.

The only other species in the genus is Secamonopsis madagascariensis, also indigenous to Madagascar. It is taller, often twining, with larger leaves than S. microphylla.
