= Anisopus =

Several genera share the name Anisopus:

- Anisopus (fly), Meigen, 1803, in the family Anisopodidae
- Anisopus (plant), N.E.Br 1895, in the family Apocynaceae
- Ovalipes, a genus of crab, formerly Anisopus De Haan, 1833, a junior homonym of Anisopus Meigen, 1803
