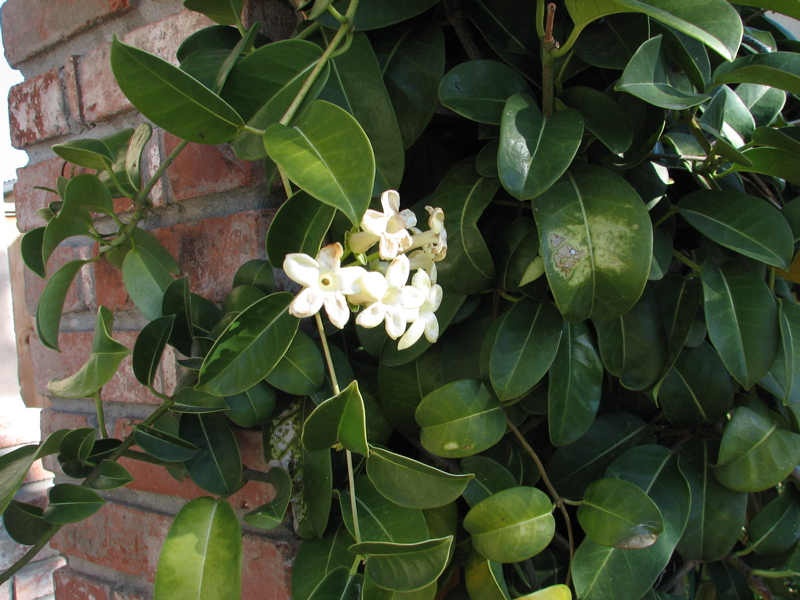
- Stephanotis floribunda

Scientific classification
- Kingdom: Plantae
- Clade: Embryophytes
- Clade: Tracheophytes
- Clade: Angiosperms
- Clade: Eudicots
- Clade: Asterids
- Order: Gentianales
- Family: Apocynaceae
- Subfamily: Asclepiadoideae
- Tribe: Marsdenieae
- Genus: Stephanotis; Thouars, 1806

Type species
- Stephanotis thouarsii Brongn.

Synonyms
- Chlorochlamys Miq. (1869); Dregea E.Mey. (1838), nom. cons.; Isaura Comm. ex Poir. (1813), nom. superfl.; Pterophora Harv. (1838); Pterygocarpus Hochst. (1843); Traunia K.Schum. (1895); Wattakaka Hassk. (1857)

= Stephanotis =

Genus of plants

Stephanotis is a genus of flowering plants first described in 1806. The name derives from the Greek στεφανωτής (stephanōtís) meaning, by sense, “fit for a crown”—from στέφανος (stéphanos), “crown”. It contains evergreen, woody-stemmed lianas with a scattered distribution in several tropical and subtropical regions.

Stephanotis are grown for their strongly perfumed, waxy, tubular, usually white flowers. Leaves are opposite, ovate to elliptic, and leathery. Stephanotis is a beautiful but difficult plant - it hates sudden changes in temperature, needs constant cool conditions in winter and is attractive to scale and mealy bug. The stems of Stephanotis can reach 10 ft (3.0 m) or more, but it is usually sold twined around a wire hoop. The heavily scented waxy flowers appear in summer.

The best known species is Stephanotis floribunda (Madagascar jasmine), which is cultivated as a tropical or hothouse ornamental, and whose flowers are a popular element in wedding bouquets.

The Stephanotis has grown in popularity over the past few years, along with some of the other spring flowering vines. It is known by a few different names such as "Madagascar jasmine" and "bridal veil".

== Species ==
15 species are accepted.

1. Stephanotis abyssinica (Hochst.) S.Reuss, Liede & Meve – tropical Africa
2. Stephanotis acuminata Brongn. – Madagascar
3. Stephanotis arabica (Decne.) S.Reuss, Liede & Meve – Yemen
4. Stephanotis brevisquama (Jum. & H.Perrier) S.Reuss, Liede & Meve – Madagascar
5. Stephanotis crinita (Oliv.) S.Reuss, Liede & Meve – tropical Africa
6. Stephanotis ernstmeyeri S.Reuss, Liede & Meve – southern Mozambique and South Africa
7. Stephanotis faulknerae (Bullock) S.Reuss, Liede & Meve – southeastern Kenya, northeastern Tanzania, and central Mozambique
8. Stephanotis floribunda Jacques – Madagascar
9. Stephanotis grandiflora Decne. – Madagascar
10. Stephanotis macrantha (Klotzsch) S.Reuss, Liede & Meve – Kenya to Mozambique and Namibia
11. Stephanotis rubicunda (K.Schum.) S.Reuss, Liede & Meve – Cameroon to Somalia, Mozambique, and Botswana
12. Stephanotis schimperi (Decne.) S.Reuss, Liede & Meve – Nigeria to Somalia and Tanzania, Angola, and the southwestern Arabian Peninsula
13. Stephanotis stelostigma (K.Schum.) S.Reuss, Liede & Meve – southern Ethiopia, Somalia, and Kenya
14. Stephanotis thouarsii Brongn. – Madagascar
15. Stephanotis volubilis (L.f.) S.Reuss, Liede & Meve – northeastern Pakistan to southern China and Java

formerly included

transferred to other genera (Jasminanthes, Marsdenia)

1. Stephanotis chinensis now Marsdenia chinensis
2. Stephanotis chunii now Jasminanthes chunii
3. Stephanotis floribunda now Marsdenia floribunda
4. Stephanotis maingayi now Marsdenia maingayi
5. Stephanotis mucronata now Jasminanthes mucronata
6. Stephanotis nana now Marsdenia stenantha
7. Stephanotis pilosa now Jasminanthes pilosa
8. Stephanotis saxatilis now Jasminanthes saxatilis
9. Stephanotis yunnanensis now Marsdenia stenantha

== See also ==
- Dregea sinensis
