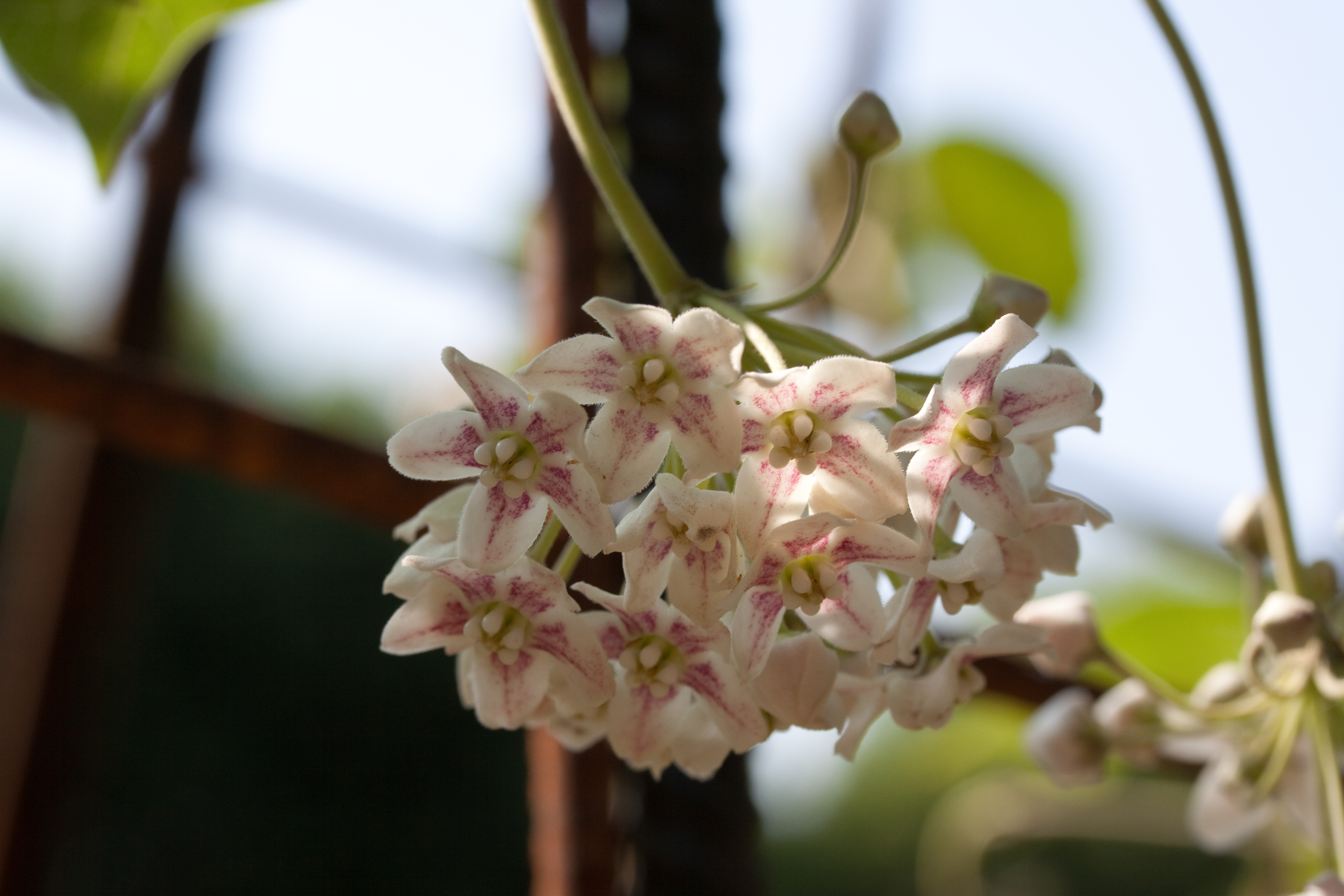

Scientific classification
- Kingdom: Plantae
- Clade: Embryophytes
- Clade: Tracheophytes
- Clade: Angiosperms
- Clade: Eudicots
- Clade: Asterids
- Order: Gentianales
- Family: Apocynaceae
- Genus: Dregea
- Species: D. sinensis

Binomial name
- Dregea sinensis Hemsl.

Synonyms
- Wattakaka sinensis (Hemsl.) Stapf

= Dregea sinensis =

Species of plant

Dregea sinensis is a species of plant in the family Apocynaceae that is native to north-central, south-central and southeastern China and Tibet. The species is regarded as "unplaced" by Plants of the World Online as of December 2023; the genus Dregea has been synonymized with Stephanotis. In 2026, the new genus Kushengia was made to accommodate Dregea sinensis as Kushengia sinensis (Hemsl.) Liede & Z.X.Ren and Dregea yunnanensis as Kushengia yunnanensis (Tsiang) Liede & Z.X.Ren. The genus name Kushengia comes from the local name of Kushengia sinensis in Kunming, Yunnan - “kǔ shéng”, meaning “bitter rope”.
