= Marsdenia brachyloba =

Scientific classification
- Kingdom: Plantae
- Clade: Tracheophytes
- Clade: Angiosperms
- Clade: Eudicots
- Clade: Asterids
- Order: Gentianales
- Family: Apocynaceae
- Genus: Marsdenia
- Species: M. brachyloba

Binomial name
- Marsdenia brachyloba M.G.Gilbert & P.T.Li

Species of plant

Marsdenia brachyloba is a plant in the family Apocynaceae. It is native to China.
