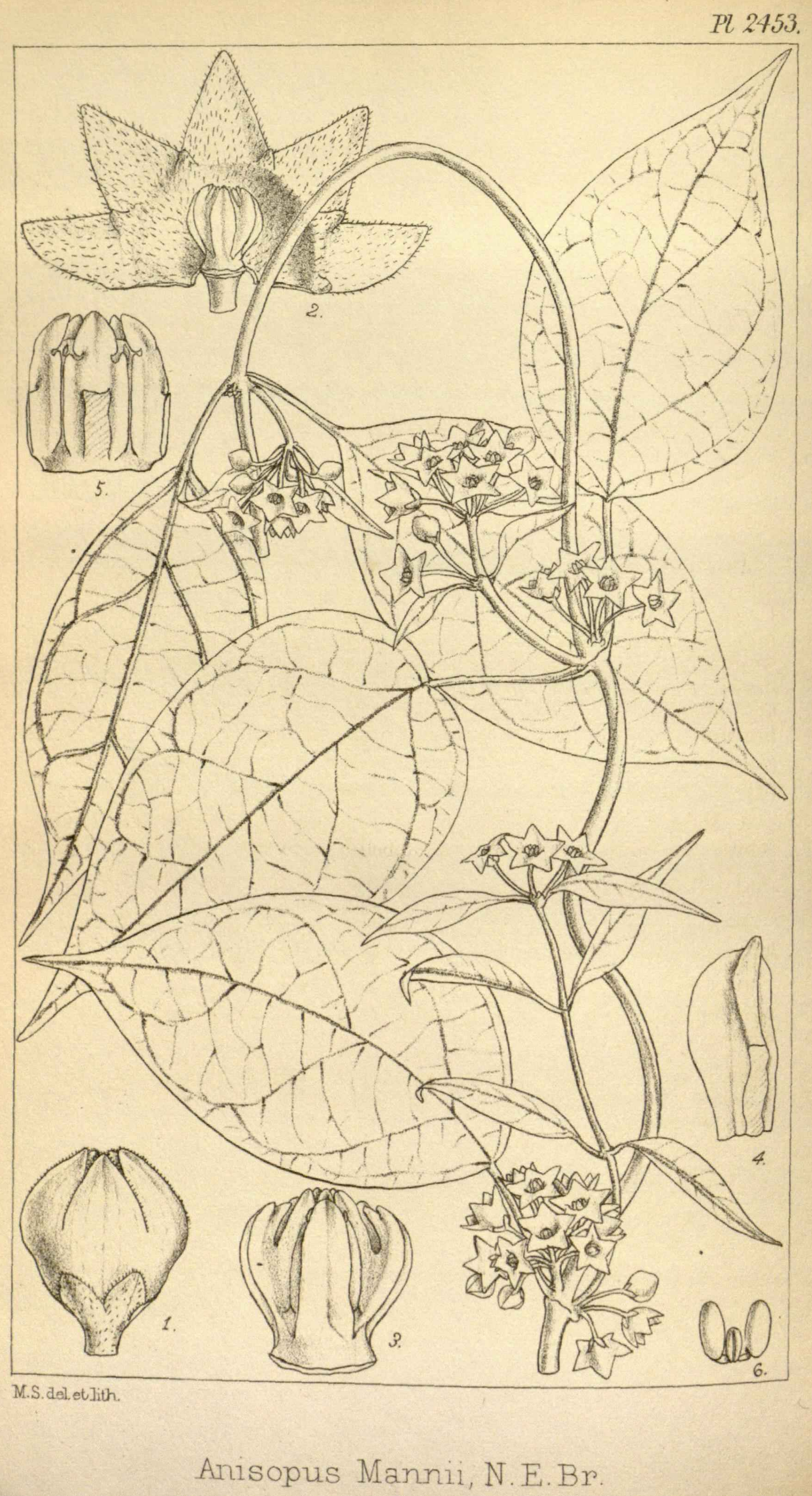
- Anisopus mannii lithograph by Matilda Smith.

Scientific classification
- Kingdom: Plantae
- Clade: Tracheophytes
- Clade: Angiosperms
- Clade: Eudicots
- Clade: Asterids
- Order: Gentianales
- Family: Apocynaceae
- Genus: Anisopus
- Species: A. mannii

Binomial name
- Anisopus mannii N.E.Br.

Synonyms
- Anisopus batesii S.Moore; Anisopus bicornatus (K.Schum.) N.E.Br.; Anisopus bicoronata (K. Schum.) N.E.Br.; Anisopus rostriferus (N.E.Br.) Bullock; Marsdenia batesii (S.Moore) S.Moore; Marsdenia bicoronata K. Schum.; Marsdenia rhynchogyna K. Schum.; Marsdenia rostrifera N.E.Br.

= Anisopus mannii =

Species of plant

Anisopus mannii is a perennial herbaceous shrub in the subfamily Asclepiadoideae of the family Apocynaceae — commonly referred to as the dogbane family. The flowering species grows in the tropical environments of central Africa, and is renown in traditional Nigerian medicine for treating sexual impotence, the common cold, diarrhea, and most notably, its potent hypoglycemic effect. Recent research has been conducted, looking in to the species' potential anti-diabetic, anti-inflammatory, analgesic, antimicrobial, and antioxidant bioactivities and mechanisms of action.

== Etymology ==
The species' anti-diabetic qualities yielded the names Sakayau and Kashe Zaki meaning "sweet killer" or "destroying sweetness" in the Hausa language used in Northern Nigeria.

== Taxonomy and related species ==
Taxonomic synonyms of the species include Anisopus batesii, A. bicornatus, A. bicoronata, A. rostriferus, Marsdenia batesii, M. bicoronata, M. rhynchogyna, M. rostrifera. Much of the taxonomical redundancy seen in A. mannii likely stems from a few minor failures of its founding taxonomist—Nicholas Edward Brown. N.E. Brown's failure to recognize the "generic unity" between species from the genera Marsdenia and Anisopus—especially in misidentifying specific features/outgrowths of the corolla, corona, tubercule, and pedicel shape.

== Description ==
Anisopus mannii possesses slightly green flowers in globose lateral umbelliform cymes. This description refers to the flower's determinate inflorescences (consisting of multiple pedicels). The species is also observed to be a strong climber.

Features are largely conserved among the species of the genus Anisopus (including A. mannii). Characteristics such as a deep green leaf color, with a yellow tinge (linked with aluminum accumulation) have been observed, in addition to maroon flowers with a greenish tinge. Differences in Anisopus flower color is one of the few indicators of distinction between the cream/white shaded flowers seen in some less related Marsdenia species.

== Distribution and habitat ==
The species is native to Africa, especially prominent in the central and western tropical regions. A. mannii spans the modern day countries of Cameroon, Equatorial Guinea, Ghana, Liberia, Gabon, the Ivory Coast, Nigeria, the Democratic Republic of the Congo, the Central African Republic, and Senegal. Species in the genus Anisopus are generally found in closed rain forest environments.

== Chemical composition ==
Proton NMR, carbon NMR, and IR spectroscopic techniques have unveiled a series of bioactive compounds found in Anisopus mannii. A novel chemical structure, "anisopusine"— a 1,7-naphthyridine alkaloid — was extracted from the dichloromethane soluble extract of the plant's bark. Along with the novel molecule, [6]-gingerdione, [6]-dehydrogingerdione, 5α-hydroxy-lup-20(29)-en-3β-yl eicosanoate, and ferulic acid were isolated from the acetone extract of the species' bark.

== Traditional uses ==
In traditional medicine in Nigeria, various parts of the plant have been used to treat elevated blood sugar levels, piles (hemorrhoids), diarrhea, infectious diseases, warding off sexual impotence, treating wounds, and to promote lactation.

In the southwest province of Cameroon, A. mannii, was utilized as a traditional fish poisoning agent. This fishing method is also employed using a variety of other bioactive plant species.
