= Stephanotis arabica =

Scientific classification
- Kingdom: Plantae
- Clade: Tracheophytes
- Clade: Angiosperms
- Clade: Eudicots
- Clade: Asterids
- Order: Gentianales
- Family: Apocynaceae
- Genus: Stephanotis
- Species: S. arabica

Binomial name
- Stephanotis arabica (Decne.) S.Reuss, Liede & Meve

Synonyms
- Dregea arabica Decne.; Marsdenia arabica (Decne.) Omlor; Marsdenia robusta Balf.f.

Species of plant

Stephanotis arabica, synonyms including Dregea arabica and Marsdenia robusta, is a species of flowering plant in the family Apocynaceae, native to Socotra and mainland Yemen. It was first described by Joseph Decaisne in 1844.

== Conservation ==
Marsdenia robusta was assessed as "vulnerable" in the 2004 IUCN Red List, where it is said to be native only to Socotra. As of December 2023, M. robusta was regarded by Plants of the World Online as a synonym of Stephanotis arabica, which is also found in mainland Yemen.
