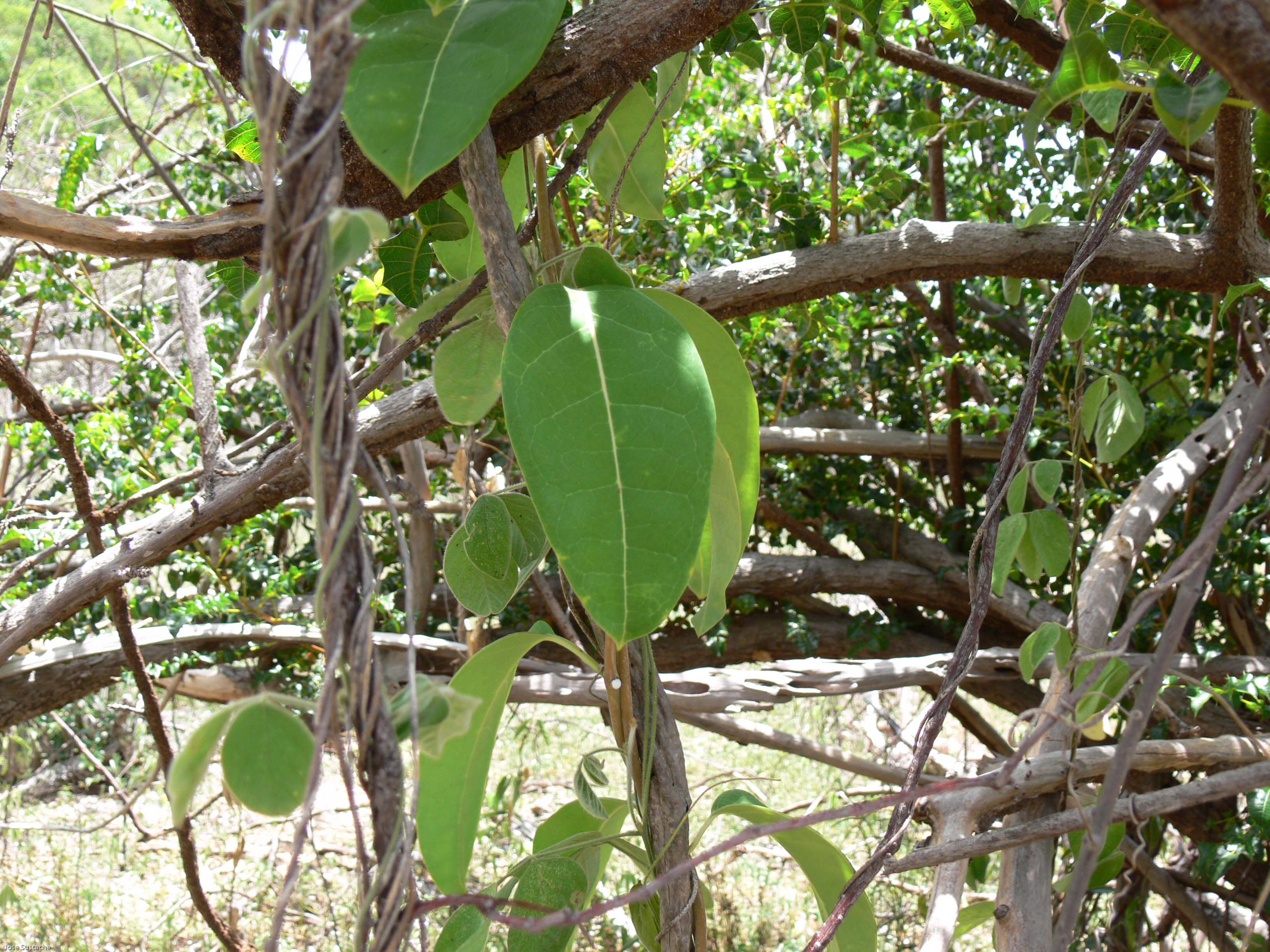
- Ruehssia woodburyana, Puerto Rico

Scientific classification
- Kingdom: Plantae
- Clade: Tracheophytes
- Clade: Angiosperms
- Clade: Eudicots
- Clade: Asterids
- Order: Gentianales
- Family: Apocynaceae
- Subfamily: Asclepiadoideae
- Tribe: Marsdenieae
- Genus: Ruehssia; H.Karst.

Synonyms
- Baxtera Rchb.; Ecliptostelma Brandegee; Elcomarhiza Barb.Rodr.; Harrisonia Hook.; Loniceroides Bullock; Pseudomarsdenia Baill.; Pseusmagennetus Ruschenb.; Sphinctostoma Benth.; Verlotia E.Fourn.

= Ruehssia =

Genus of plants

Ruehssia is a genus of plants in the family Apocynaceae. It is also in the Asclepiadoideae subfamily and Marsdenieae tribe.

Its native range is tropical and subtropical South America. It is found in Argentina (north-eastern and north-western), Belize, Bolivia, Brazil (north, north-eastern, south, south-eastern and west-central), Colombia, Costa Rica, Cuba, Dominican Republic, Ecuador, El Salvador, French Guiana, Guatemala, Guyana, Haiti, Honduras, Jamaica, the Leeward Islands, Mexico (north-eastern, south-eastern and south-western), Nicaragua, Panamá, Paraguay, Peru, Suriname, Trinidad and Tobago, Uruguay, Venezuela and the Windward Islands.

The genus name of Ruehssia is in honour of Carl Andreas Rühsz (1805–1880), the German consul in Puerto Cabello, Venezuela. He was a supporter of art and science. It was first described in 1849.

== Species ==
As of February 2026, Plants of the World Online accepted the following species:

- Ruehssia affinis (A.Rich.) Morillo
- Ruehssia altissima (Jacq.) F.Esp.Santo & Rapini
- Ruehssia amorimii (Morillo) F.Esp.Santo & Rapini
- Ruehssia amylacea (Barb.Rodr.) F.Esp.Santo & Rapini
- Ruehssia asclepioidea (Rusby) Liede & H.A.Keller
- Ruehssia asplundii (Morillo & Spellman) Liede & H.A.Keller
- Ruehssia astephanoides (A.Gray) L.O.Alvarado
- Ruehssia avacanoeira (F.Esp.Santo) F.Esp.Santo & Rapini
- Ruehssia bahiensis I.C.Oliveira & F.Esp.Santo
- Ruehssia beatricis (Morillo) Liede & H.A.Keller
- Ruehssia beckii (Morillo) Morillo
- Ruehssia bergii (Morillo) F.Esp.Santo & Rapini
- Ruehssia bourgaeana (Baill.) L.O.Alvarado
- Ruehssia brasiliensis (Decne.) F.Esp.Santo & Rapini
- Ruehssia breviramosa (Rapini & Fontella) F.Esp.Santo & Rapini
- Ruehssia caatingae (Morillo) F.Esp.Santo & Rapini
- Ruehssia calcaria (F.Esp.Santo) F.Esp.Santo & Rapini
- Ruehssia calichicola (Carnevali & Juárez-Jaimes) L.O.Alvarado
- Ruehssia callosa (Juárez-Jaimes & W.D.Stevens) L.O.Alvarado
- Ruehssia campanulata (Griseb.) Morillo & Mora Méndez
- Ruehssia carterae (W.D.Stevens & Juárez-Jaimes) L.O.Alvarado
- Ruehssia carvalhoi (Morillo & Carnevali) F.Esp.Santo & Rapini
- Ruehssia castillonii (Lillo ex T.Mey.) H.A.Keller & Liede
- Ruehssia clausa (R.Br.) Liede, S.Reuss & Meve
- Ruehssia colombiana (Morillo) Liede & H.A.Keller
- Ruehssia condensiflora (S.F.Blake) Liede & H.A.Keller
- Ruehssia coulteri (Hemsl.) L.O.Alvarado
- Ruehssia crassipes (Hemsl.) Morillo & Mora Méndez
- Ruehssia cubensis (Turcz.) Liede, S.Reuss & Meve
- Ruehssia cuixmalensis (Juárez-Jaimes & L.O.Alvarado) L.O.Alvarado
- Ruehssia cundurango (Triana) Liede & H.A.Keller
- Ruehssia cuneata (L.O.Williams) Morillo & Mora Méndez
- Ruehssia dictyophylla (Urb.) Acev.-Rodr.
- Ruehssia dorothyae (Fontella & Morillo) F.Esp.Santo & Rapini
- Ruehssia dressleri (Spellman) Morillo & Mora Méndez
- Ruehssia dussii (Schltr.) Acev.-Rodr.
- Ruehssia ecuadorensis (Morillo & Spellman) Liede & H.A.Keller
- Ruehssia edulis (S.Watson) L.O.Alvarado
- Ruehssia ekmanii (Alain) Acev.-Rodr.
- Ruehssia elliptica (Decne.) Acev.-Rodr.
- Ruehssia engleriana (W.Rothe) Morillo & Mora Méndez
- Ruehssia ferreyrae (Morillo) Morillo
- Ruehssia fontellana (Morillo & Carnevali) F.Esp.Santo & Rapini
- Ruehssia fruticosa (Donn.Sm.) L.O.Alvarado
- Ruehssia fusca (C.Wright ex Griseb.) Liede, S.Reuss & Meve
- Ruehssia gallardoae (Lozada-Pérez) Lozada-Pérez
- Ruehssia gilgiana (W.Rothe) Morillo & Mora Méndez
- Ruehssia gillespieae (Morillo) Liede & H.A.Keller
- Ruehssia gonavensis (Urb.) Morillo
- Ruehssia gualanensis (Donn.Sm.) L.O.Alvarado
- Ruehssia guanchezii (Morillo) Liede & H.A.Keller
- Ruehssia guaranitica (Malme) Liede & H.A.Keller
- Ruehssia gymnemoides (W.Rothe) L.O.Alvarado
- Ruehssia haitiensis (Urb.) Acev.-Rodr.
- Ruehssia hassleriana (Malme) Liede & H.A.Keller
- Ruehssia hatschbachii (Morillo) F.Esp.Santo & Rapini
- Ruehssia heringeri (Fontella) F.Esp.Santo & Rapini
- Ruehssia hilariana (E.Fourn.) F.Esp.Santo & Rapini
- Ruehssia hiriartiana (Juárez-Jaimes & W.D.Stevens) L.O.Alvarado
- Ruehssia lanata (Paul G.Wilson) L.O.Alvarado
- Ruehssia lauretiana (Woodson) F.Esp.Santo & Rapini
- Ruehssia laxiflora (Donn.Sm.) Gonz.-Martínez & Lozada-Pérez
- Ruehssia linearis (Decne.) Liede, S.Reuss & Meve
- Ruehssia longiflora (A.Rich.) Liede, S.Reuss & Meve
- Ruehssia loniceroides (Hook.) F.Esp.Santo & Rapini
- Ruehssia ludani (Juárez-Jaimes & Saynes) L.O.Alvarado
- Ruehssia macfadyenii (Rendle) Acev.-Rodr.
- Ruehssia macieliana (Fontella & Paixão) Morillo
- Ruehssia macroglossa (Schltr.) Acev.-Rodr.
- Ruehssia macrophylla (Humb. & Bonpl. ex Schult.) H.Karst.
- Ruehssia magallanesiana (Juárez-Jaimes) L.O.Alvarado
- Ruehssia magalloniae García-Mend., D.Sandoval & L.O.Alvarado
- Ruehssia malmeana (W.Rothe) F.Esp.Santo & Rapini
- Ruehssia mayana (Lundell) L.O.Alvarado
- Ruehssia megalantha (Goyder & Morillo) F.Esp.Santo & Rapini
- Ruehssia mexicana (Decne.) L.O.Alvarado
- Ruehssia microcarpa (Juárez-Jaimes & Lozada-Pérez) L.O.Alvarado
- Ruehssia minutiflora (F.Esp.Santo) F.Esp.Santo & Rapini
- Ruehssia mollis (Brandegee) L.O.Alvarado
- Ruehssia montana (Malme) F.Esp.Santo & Rapini
- Ruehssia naiguatensis (Morillo) Liede & H.A.Keller
- Ruehssia nana (Rapini & Fontella) F.Esp.Santo & Rapini
- Ruehssia neomanarae (Morillo) F.Esp.Santo & Rapini
- Ruehssia neriifolia (Decne.) L.O.Alvarado
- Ruehssia nicaraguensis (W.D.Stevens) Morillo & Mora Méndez
- Ruehssia nicoyana (Pittier) Morillo & Mora Méndez
- Ruehssia nitida (Poir.) Acev.-Rodr.
- Ruehssia nubicola (Alain) Acev.-Rodr.
- Ruehssia oaxacana (Morillo) L.O.Alvarado
- Ruehssia olgamarthae (W.D.Stevens) Morillo & Mora Méndez
- Ruehssia oligantha (K.Schum.) Liede & H.A.Keller
- Ruehssia otoniensis (Fontella & Morillo) F.Esp.Santo & Rapini
- Ruehssia paganuccii (F.Esp.Santo & A.P.B.Santos) F.Esp.Santo & Rapini
- Ruehssia paraguaiensis (Morillo) Liede & H.A.Keller
- Ruehssia paraibana (F.Esp.Santo & A.P.B.Santos) F.Esp.Santo & Rapini
- Ruehssia parvifolia (Brandegee) L.O.Alvarado
- Ruehssia phallica (F.Esp.Santo) F.Esp.Santo & Rapini
- Ruehssia pickelii (Fontella & Morillo) F.Esp.Santo & Rapini
- Ruehssia pinetorum (Standl. & L.O.Williams) Gonz.-Martínez & Lozada-Pérez
- Ruehssia popoluca (Juárez-Jaimes & A.Campos) L.O.Alvarado
- Ruehssia pringlei (S.Watson) L.O.Alvarado
- Ruehssia propinqua (Hemsl.) L.O.Alvarado
- Ruehssia pseudoedulis (Woodson) Morillo & Mora Méndez
- Ruehssia quirinopolensis I.L.Morais & F.Esp.Santo
- Ruehssia riparia (Morillo & Spellman) F.Esp.Santo & Rapini
- Ruehssia robinsonii (J.R.Johnst.) Liede & H.A.Keller
- Ruehssia rotheana (Woodson) Liede & H.A.Keller
- Ruehssia rubrofusca (E.Fourn.) F.Esp.Santo & Rapini
- Ruehssia rupestris (F.Esp.Santo) F.Esp.Santo & Rapini
- Ruehssia rzedowskiana (Juárez-Jaimes & W.D.Stevens) L.O.Alvarado
- Ruehssia salaschiblii (L.O.Alvarado & K.Maya M.) K.Maya M.
- Ruehssia saturejifolia (A.Rich.) Liede, S.Reuss & Meve
- Ruehssia schlechteriana (W.Rothe) L.O.Alvarado
- Ruehssia serpentina (F.Esp.Santo) F.Esp.Santo & Rapini
- Ruehssia sessilifolia (E.Fourn.) F.Esp.Santo & Rapini
- Ruehssia silverstonei Morillo
- Ruehssia smithii (Morillo) Liede & H.A.Keller
- Ruehssia spiralis (W.Rothe) Liede & H.A.Keller
- Ruehssia sprucei (W.Rothe) F.Esp.Santo & Rapini
- Ruehssia stephanotidifolia (Woodson) L.O.Alvarado
- Ruehssia stevensiana (Juárez-Jaimes) L.O.Alvarado
- Ruehssia steyermarkii (Woodson) L.O.Alvarado
- Ruehssia suberosa (E.Fourn.) F.Esp.Santo & Rapini
- Ruehssia suffruticosa (Alain) Acev.-Rodr.
- Ruehssia sumiderensis Lozada-Pérez, Ram.-Mar. & Gonz.-Martínez
- Ruehssia tholiformis (Juárez-Jaimes & L.O.Alvarado) L.O.Alvarado
- Ruehssia thomasii (Morillo) F.Esp.Santo & Rapini
- Ruehssia tolimensis (Morillo) Liede & H.A.Keller
- Ruehssia tressensiae (S.A.Cáceres & Morillo) H.A.Keller & Liede
- Ruehssia trisegmentata (F.Esp.Santo & A.P.B.Santos) F.Esp.Santo & Rapini
- Ruehssia trivirgulata (Bartlett) L.O.Alvarado
- Ruehssia troyana (Urb.) Acev.-Rodr.
- Ruehssia tubularis (L.O.Williams) L.O.Alvarado
- Ruehssia ulei (Schltr. & W.Rothe) F.Esp.Santo & Rapini
- Ruehssia umbellata (Griseb.) Liede, S.Reuss & Meve
- Ruehssia undulata (Jacq.) Liede & H.A.Keller
- Ruehssia veronicae (W.D.Stevens) L.O.Alvarado
- Ruehssia vinciflora (Griseb.) Liede, S.Reuss & Meve
- Ruehssia virgultorum (E.Fourn.) F.Esp.Santo & Rapini
- Ruehssia weberbaueri (Schltr. & W.Rothe) Liede & H.A.Keller
- Ruehssia weddellii (E.Fourn.) F.Esp.Santo & Rapini
- Ruehssia woodburyana (Acev.-Rodr.) Goyder
- Ruehssia xerohylica (Dugand) Liede & H.A.Keller
- Ruehssia yamanigueyensis Mangelsdorff
- Ruehssia zehntneri (Fontella) F.Esp.Santo & Rapini
- Ruehssia zimapanica (Hemsl.) L.O.Alvarado
