= Dischidanthus =

Scientific classification
- Kingdom: Plantae
- Clade: Tracheophytes
- Clade: Angiosperms
- Clade: Eudicots
- Clade: Asterids
- Order: Gentianales
- Family: Apocynaceae
- Subfamily: Asclepiadoideae
- Tribe: Marsdenieae
- Genus: Dischidanthus; Tsiang

Species
- See text.

Genus of flowering plants

Dischidanthus is a genus of plants in the family Apocynaceae, first described as a genus in 1936. Species of the genus are native from the east Himalayas to south China and Peninsular Malaysia. It may be treated by some sources as a synonym of Marsdenia.

== Species ==
As of November 2023, Plants of the World Online accepted two species:

- Dischidanthus thyrsiflorus (Hook.f.) S.Reuss, Liede & Meve
- Dischidanthus urceolatus (Decne.) Tsiang
