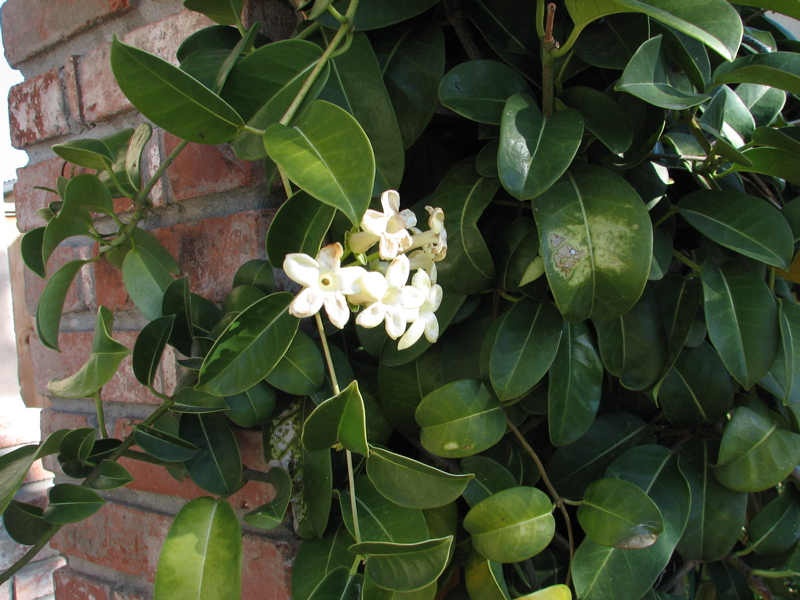

Scientific classification
- Kingdom: Plantae
- Clade: Tracheophytes
- Clade: Angiosperms
- Clade: Eudicots
- Clade: Asterids
- Order: Gentianales
- Family: Apocynaceae
- Genus: Stephanotis
- Species: S. floribunda

Binomial name
- Stephanotis floribunda Brongn.

= Stephanotis floribunda =

Species of flowering plant

Stephanotis floribunda syn. S. jasminoides, the Madagascar jasmine, waxflower, Hawaiian wedding flower, or bride's flower is a species of flowering plant in the family Apocynaceae, native to Madagascar. It is a twining, sparsely branched liana that can measure up to 6 m in length.

Despite its common name, the species is not a "true jasmine" and not of the genus Jasminum.

== Description ==
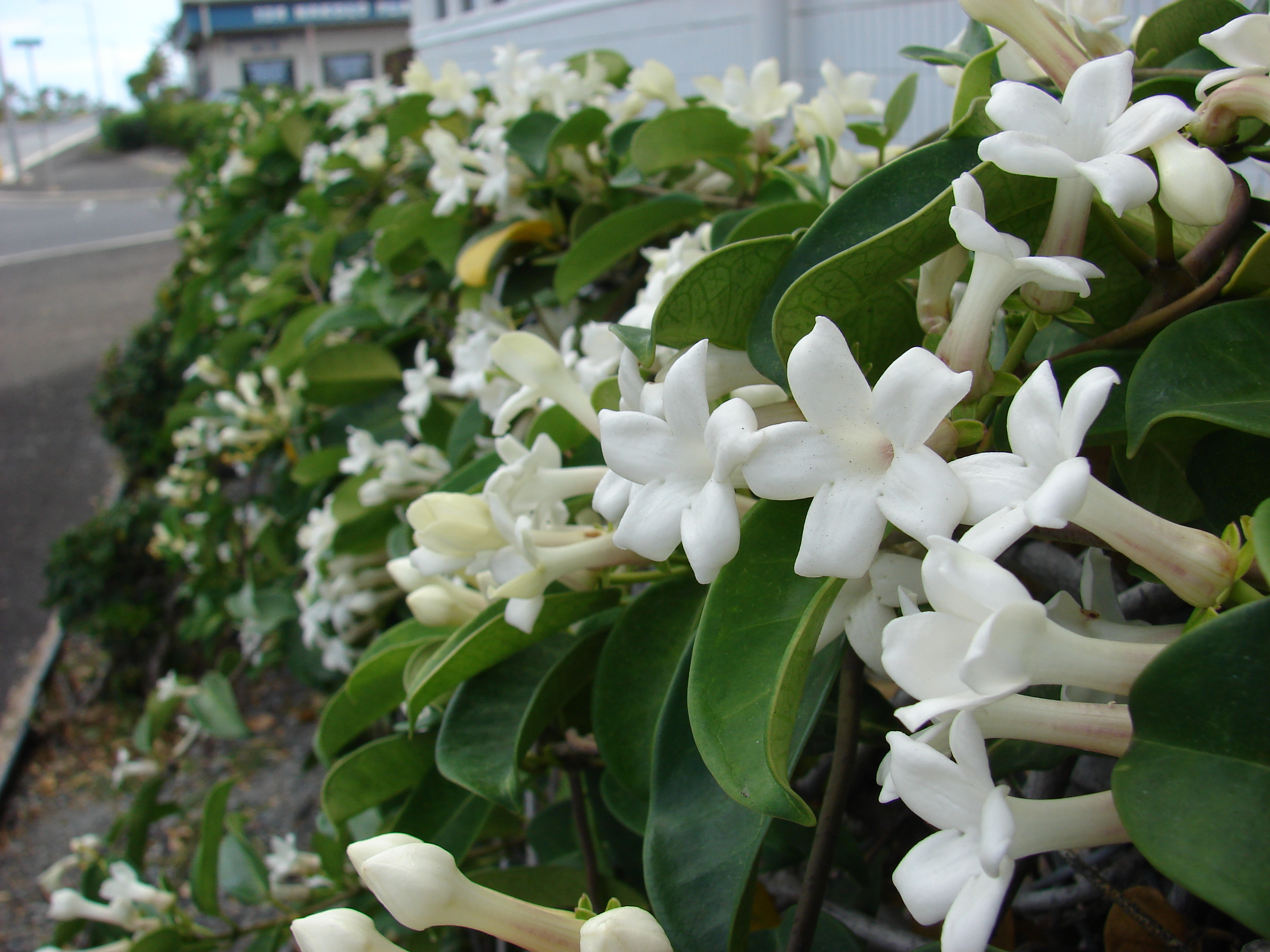
Leaves and flowers

Growing to 6 m (20 ft) or more, it is an evergreen woody climber with oval leaves and clusters of pure white, waxy, intensely fragrant tubular flowers. The leather-like leaves are up to about 5 × 9 cm in size; they are glossy dark green.

The flowers are waxy, star-shaped and highly scented, about 3 cm long, in clusters and are produced in summer. This vine flowers only on new growth, and thus pruning should be kept to a minimum, especially during the growth season. Flowers fade to yellow after several days and the deep, rich fragrance turns sour in smell. The flowers are in axillary umbels. The flowering period is from spring to fall.

The wreath loop forms large plum-like fruits, which, however, rarely set in specimens cultivated as indoor plants. The ovoid-shaped fruits contain numerous seeds with pappus.

== Cultivation ==
Madagascar's climate, with its moderate temperatures, high humidity and seasonal cycles of hot, wet summers and cool, dry winters provides the optimal growing conditions for Stephanotis. Grown commercially, the trumpet-shaped blooms are in season year-round, provided they are given enough light and water, and are a popular component of bridal bouquets. It grows best in sunny, tropical conditions, or inside.

In areas where the outside winter temperature drops below 4 °C (39 °F), Stephanotis floribunda can be wintered over in greenhouse or household settings. During the summer growth season, this vine requires full sun, abundant water, high humidity and a balanced fertilizer. As temperatures begin to cool, pots should be brought indoors and placed in the sunniest location available. Stephanotis floribunda appears to do best if root bound. The soil mixture used should have a high content of loam and peat moss with generous drainage material such as perlite or coarse sand. Although Stephanotis do not technically go dormant, their growth is slowed and flowering is infrequent if kept in a cool, dry condition.

This plant has gained the Royal Horticultural Society's Award of Garden Merit.

Propagation is by cuttings or by the seeds, which are produced irregularly.

== Gallery ==
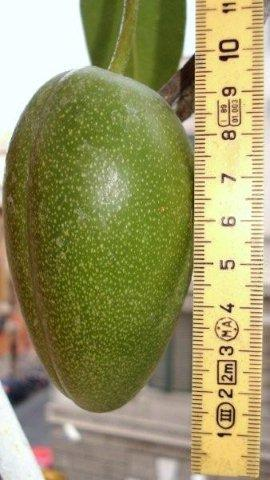
seed pod

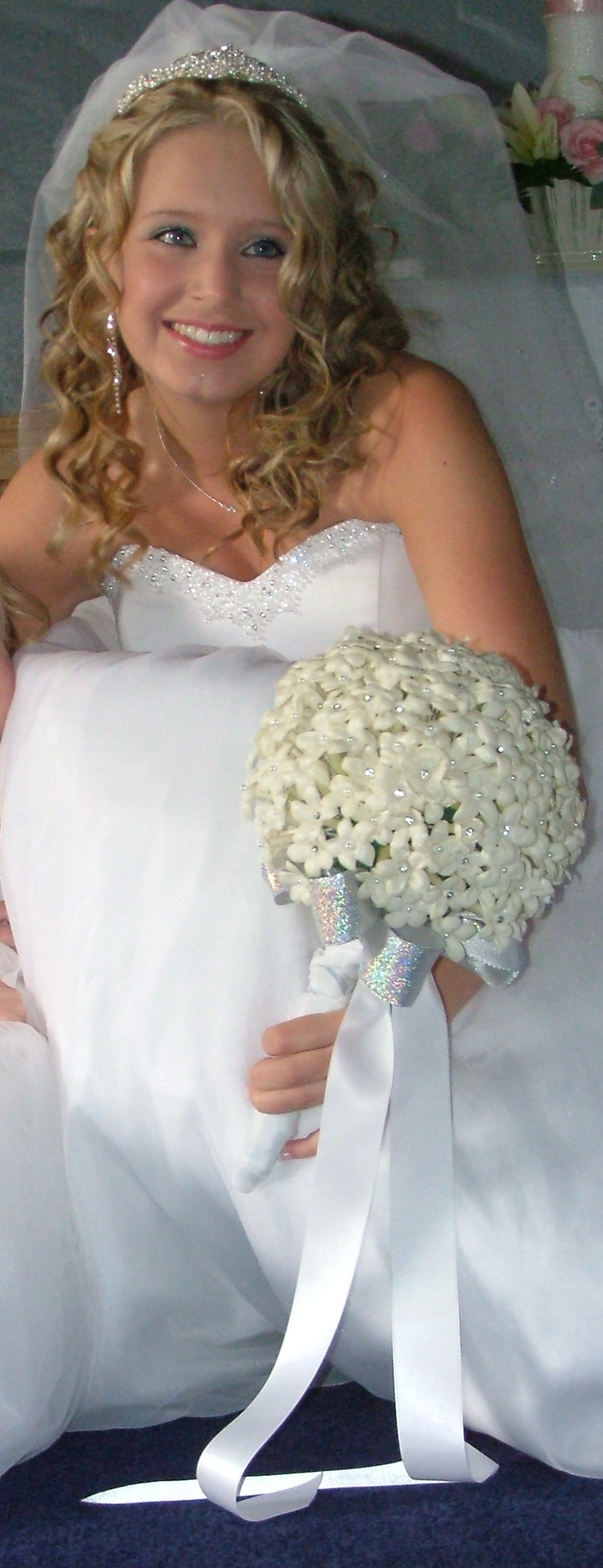
A bride with a Stephanotis bouquet

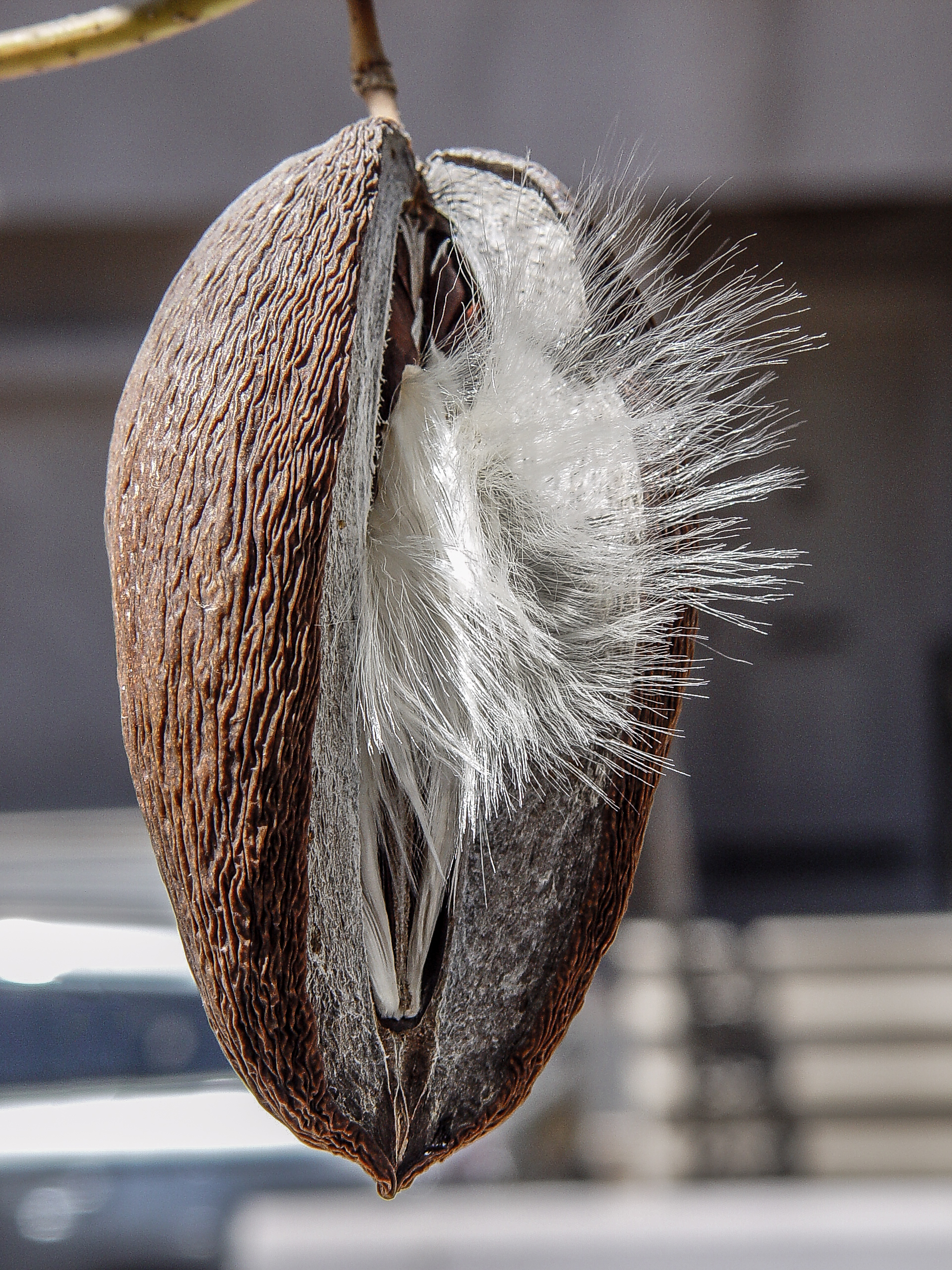
Stephanotis floribunda dry pod - seeds with 'parachutes' are still in

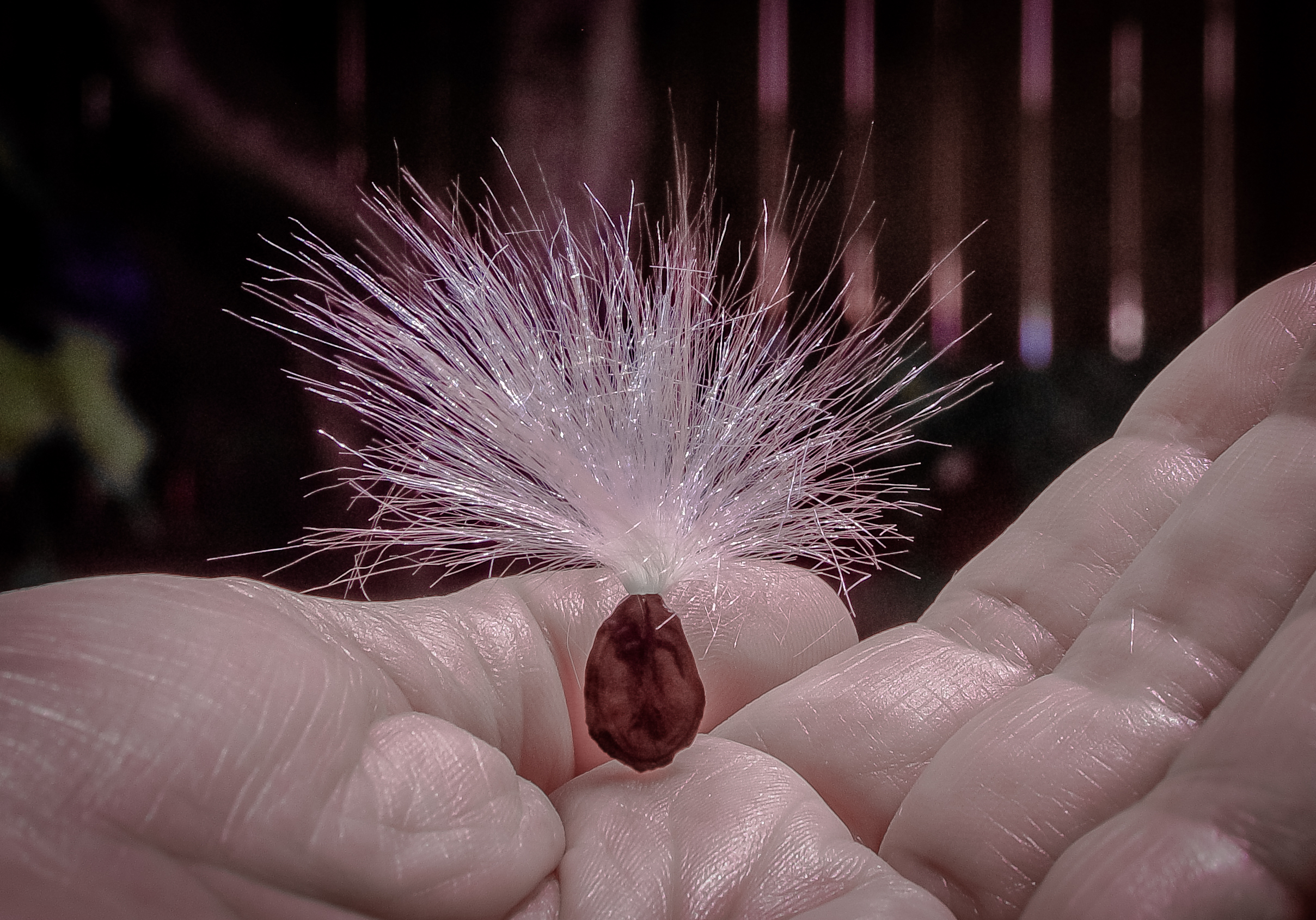
Stephanotis floribunda seed with 'parachute'

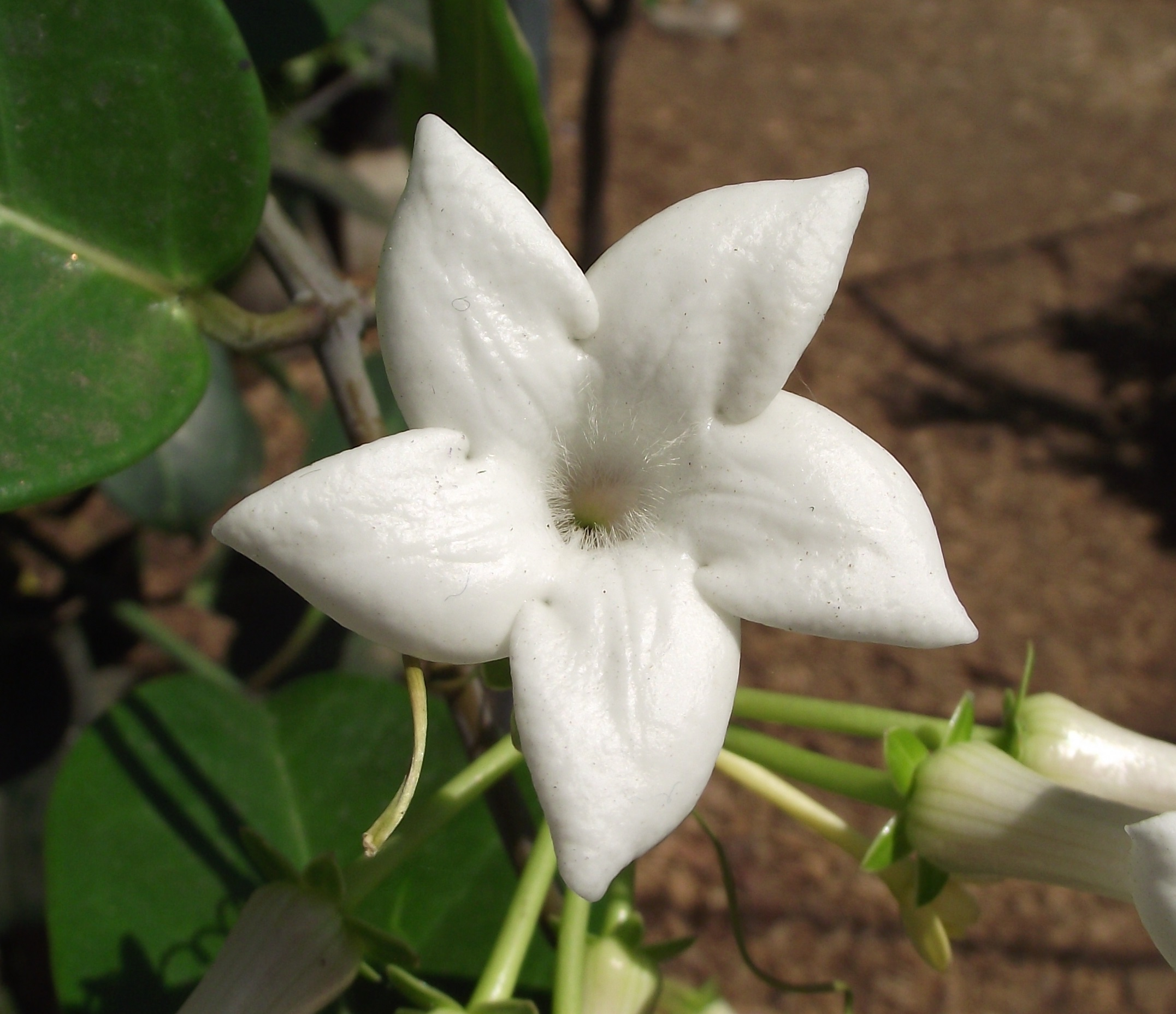
Flower closeup

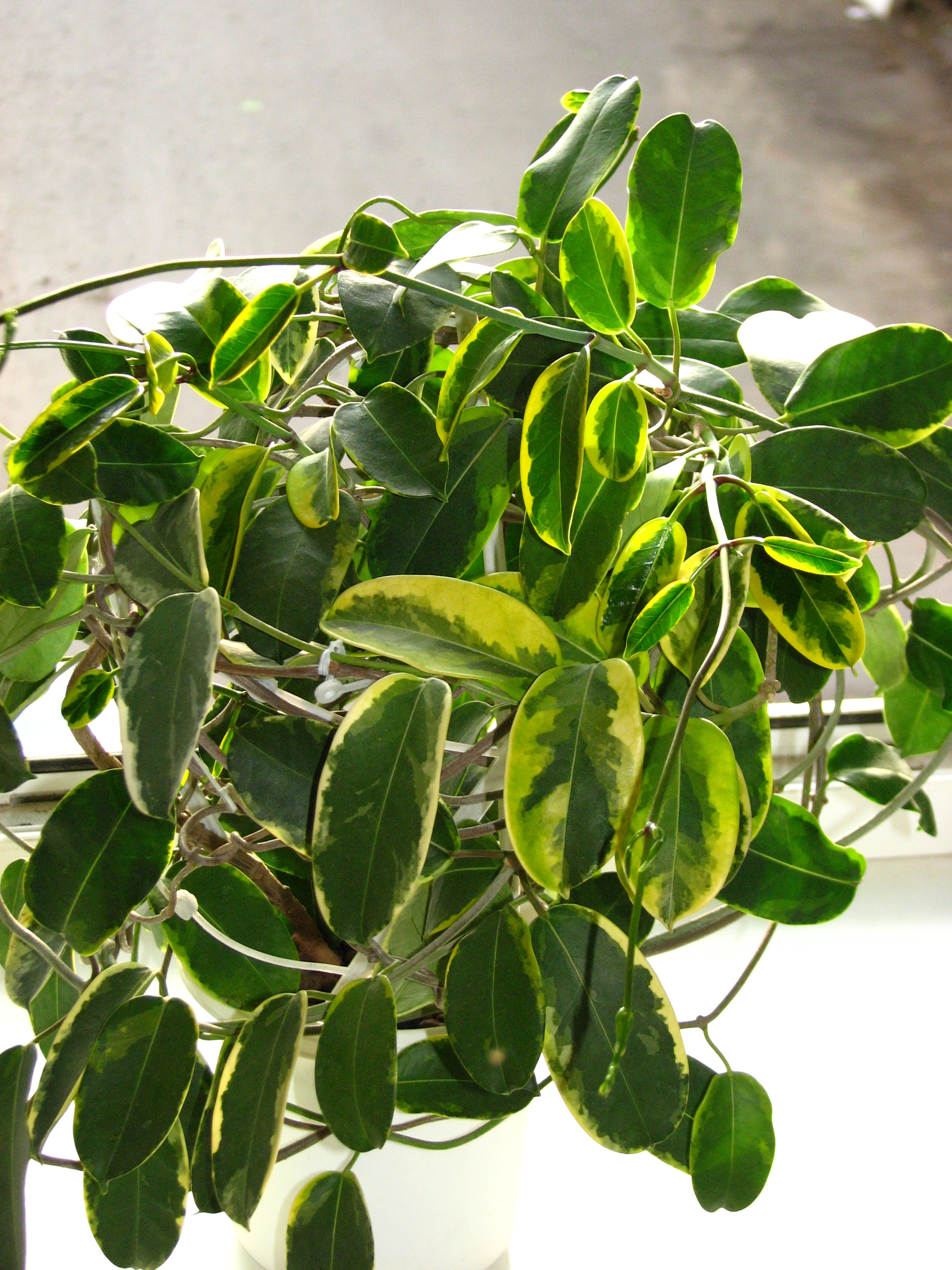
Variegated variety

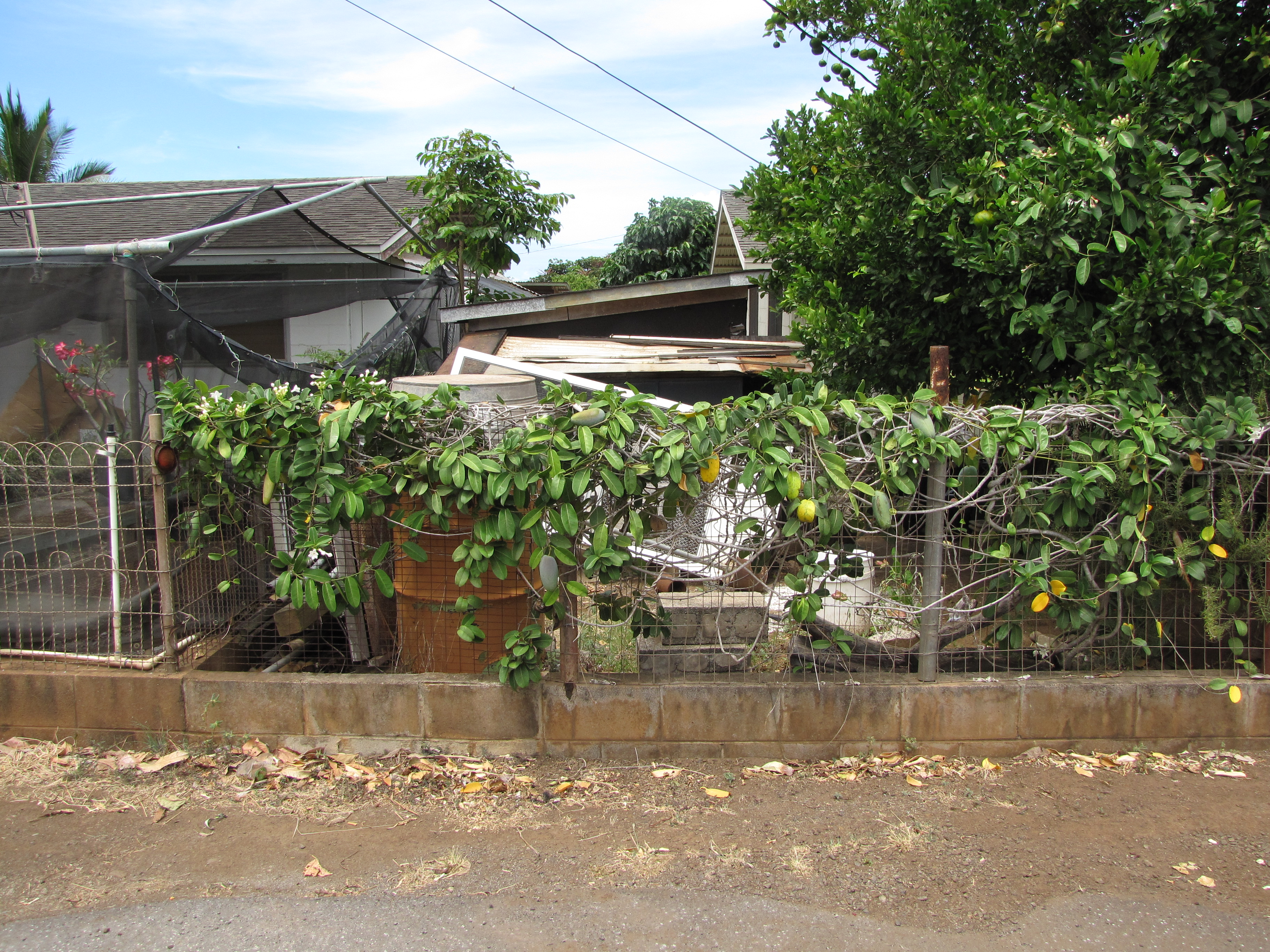
Trailing on fence

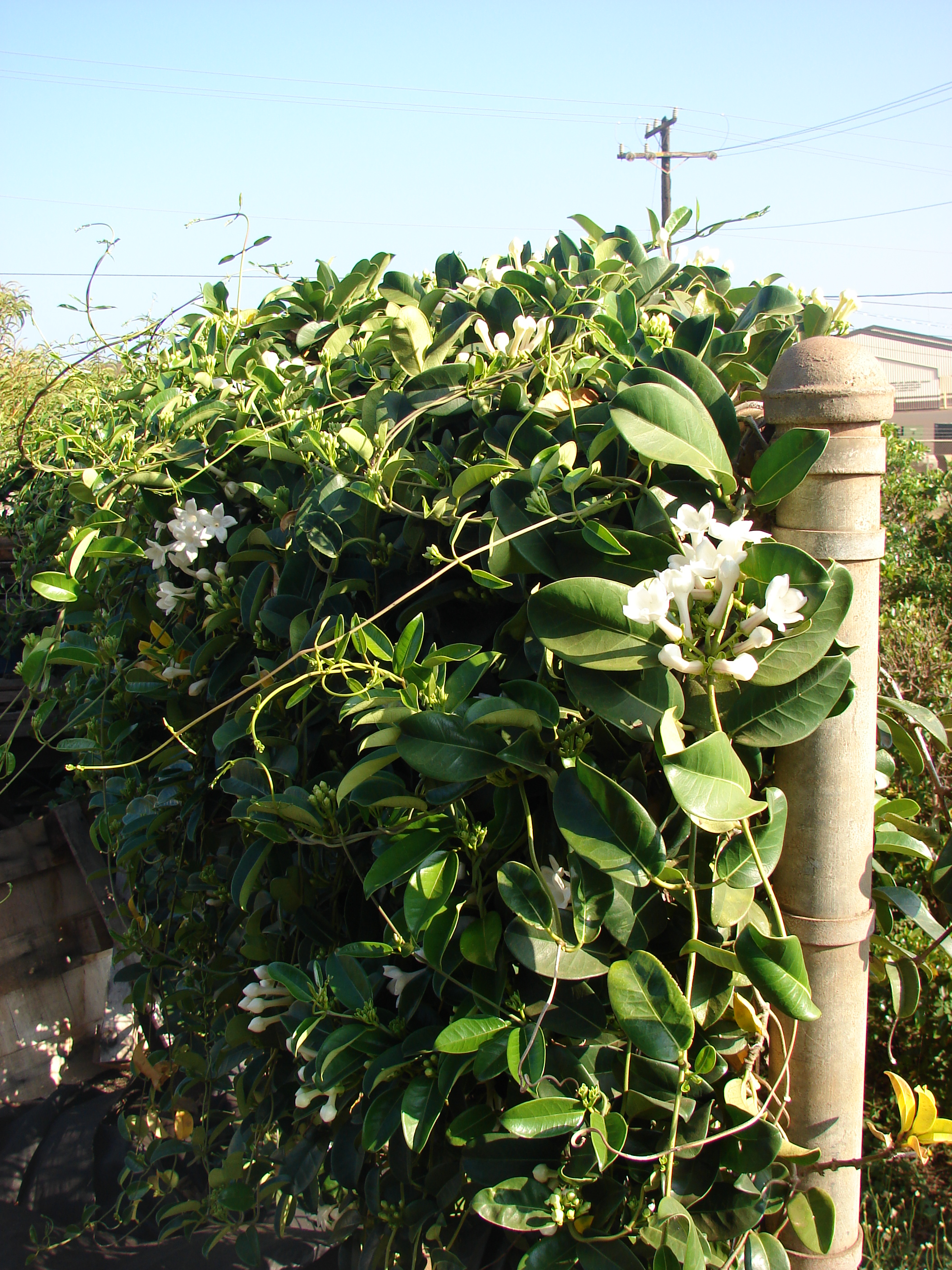
Climbing a fence

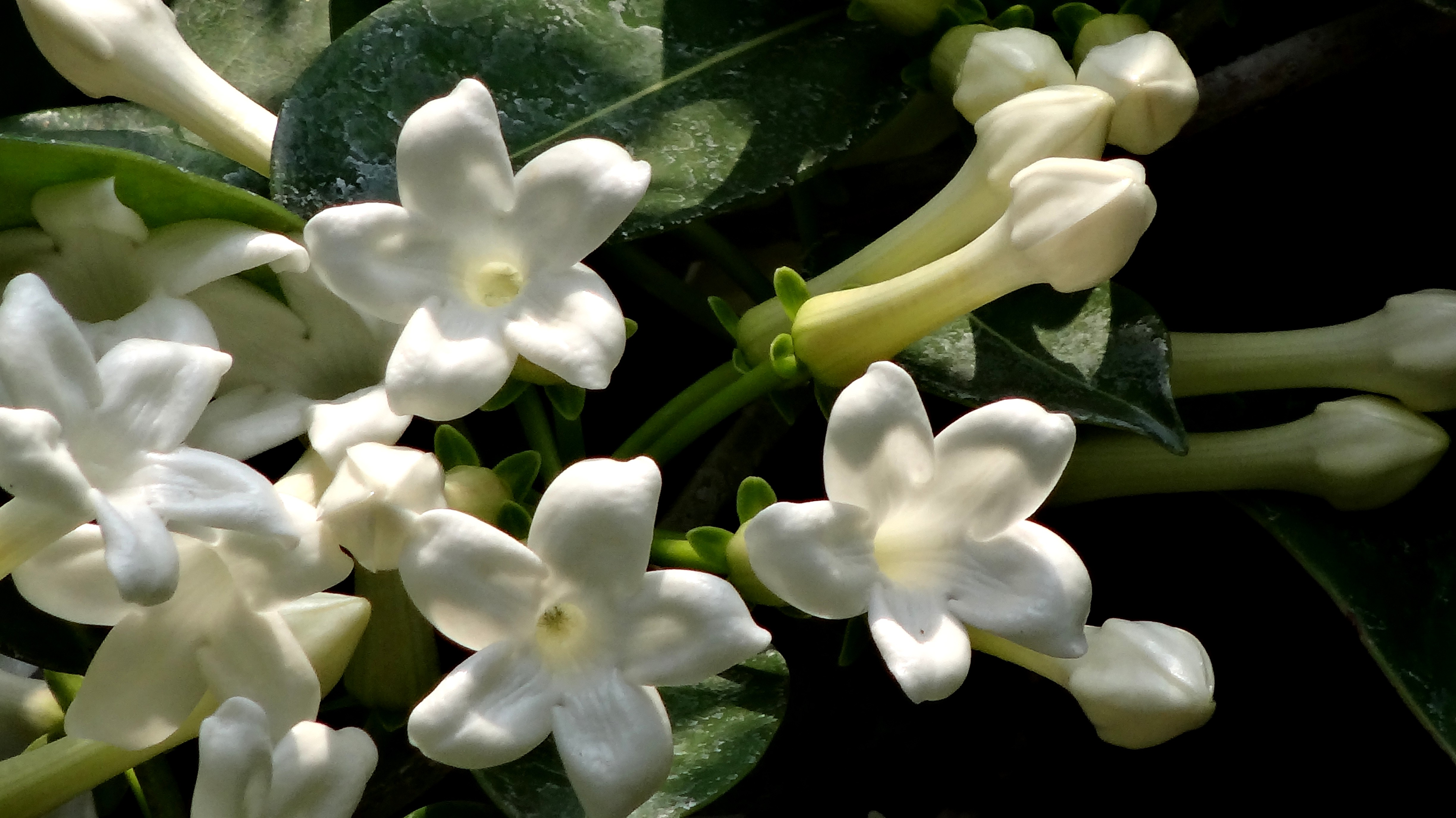
Flower cluster
