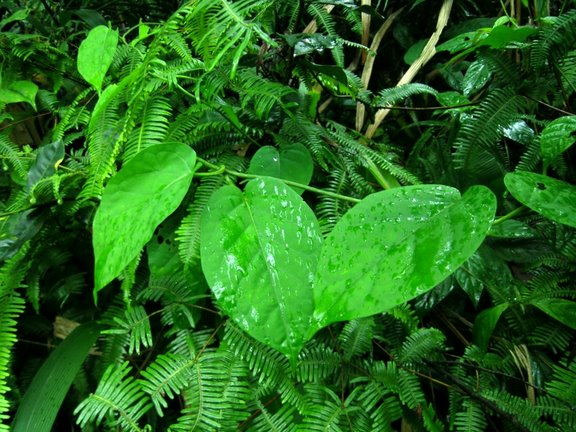
- Jasminanthes mucronata

Scientific classification
- Kingdom: Plantae
- Clade: Tracheophytes
- Clade: Angiosperms
- Clade: Eudicots
- Clade: Asterids
- Order: Gentianales
- Family: Apocynaceae
- Subfamily: Asclepiadoideae
- Tribe: Marsdenieae
- Genus: Jasminanthes; Blume

Synonyms
- Stephanotis Du Petit-Thouars sect. Jasminanthes (Blume) Hemsley; Huthamnus Tsiang

= Jasminanthes =

Genus of plants

Jasminanthes is a plant genus in the family Apocynaceae, first described as a genus in 1850. It is native to China, Laos, Thailand and Vietnam.

Species

- Jasminanthes chunii (Tsiang) W.D. Stevens & P.T. Li - Guangdong, Guangxi, Hunan
- Jasminanthes laotica Y.H. Tan & H.B. Ding - Laos
- Jasminanthes mucronata (Blanco) W.D. Stevens & P.T. Li - Fujian, Guangdong, Guangxi, Guizhou, Hunan, Sichuan, Taiwan, Zhejiang
- Jasminanthes pilosa (Kerr) W.D. Stevens & P.T. Li - Guangxi, Yunnan, Thailand, Vietnam
- Jasminanthes saxatilis (Tsiang & P.T. Li) W.D. Stevens & P.T. Li - Guangxi, Yunnan
- Jasminanthes tuyetanhiae T.B.Tran & Rodda - Vietnam
- Jasminanthes xuanlienensis T.B Tran & Rodda - Vietnam

formerly included

transferred to Stephanotis

- Jasminanthes suaveolens Blume is now a synonym of Stephanotis suaveolens (Blume) Benth. & Hook. f. ex K. Schum.
