= Ruehssia elliptica =

Scientific classification
- Kingdom: Plantae
- Clade: Tracheophytes
- Clade: Angiosperms
- Clade: Eudicots
- Clade: Asterids
- Order: Gentianales
- Family: Apocynaceae
- Tribe: Marsdenieae
- Genus: Ruehssia
- Species: R. elliptica

Binomial name
- Ruehssia elliptica (Decne.) Acev.-Rodr.

Synonyms
- Marsdenia elliptica Decne.

Species of plant

Ruehssia elliptica, synonym Marsdenia elliptica, the jungle netvine, is a species of flowering plant in the family Apocynaceae. It is endemic to forests in Puerto Rico.
