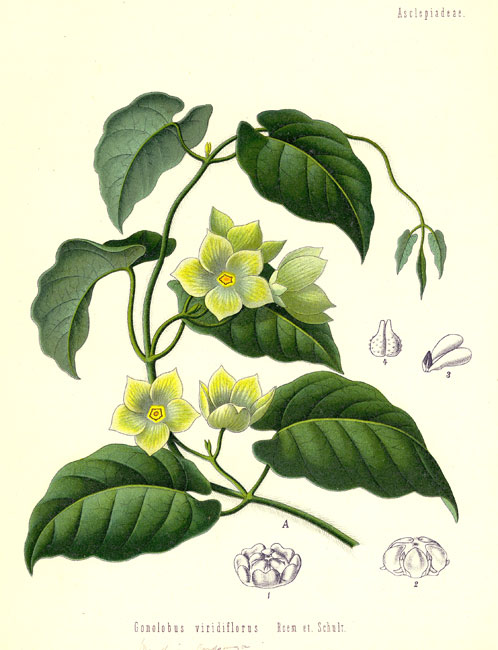
- Marsdenia cundurango

Scientific classification
- Kingdom: Plantae
- Clade: Tracheophytes
- Clade: Angiosperms
- Clade: Eudicots
- Clade: Asterids
- Order: Gentianales
- Family: Apocynaceae
- Genus: Ruehssia
- Species: R. cundurango

Binomial name
- Ruehssia cundurango (Triana) Liede & H.A.Keller

Subspecies
- See text.

Synonyms
- Of the species: Gonolobus cundurango Triana; Of subsp. cundurango: Marsdenia cundurango Rchb.f.; Marsdenia reichenbachii Triana, nom. superfl.; Pseudomarsdenia cundurango (Rchb.f.) Schltr.; Pseusmagennetus equatoriensis Ruschenb.; Of subsp. fosteri: Marsdenia cundurango subsp. fosteri Morillo

= Ruehssia cundurango =

Species of plant

Ruehssia cundurango is a species of plant of the genus Ruehssia native to Colombia, Ecuador and Peru in South America. It has the common name condurango. The subspecies Ruehssia cundurango subsp. cundurango (synonym Marsdenia cundurango) is known to contain conduritol, a cyclitol or cyclic polyol. It was first isolated in 1908 by K. Kübler from the bark of the vine.

== Subspecies ==
As of November 2023, Plants of the World Online accepted two subspecies:

- Ruehssia cundurango subsp. cundurango – Colombia, Ecuador, Peru
- Ruehssia cundurango subsp. fosteri (Morillo) Liede & H.A.Keller – Peru
