= Dischidanthus urceolatus =

Scientific classification
- Kingdom: Plantae
- Clade: Tracheophytes
- Clade: Angiosperms
- Clade: Eudicots
- Clade: Asterids
- Order: Gentianales
- Family: Apocynaceae
- Subfamily: Asclepiadoideae
- Tribe: Marsdenieae
- Genus: Dischidanthus
- Species: D. urceolatus

Binomial name
- Dischidanthus urceolatus (Decne.) Tsiang

Synonyms
- Marsdenia urceolata Decne.

Species of plant

Dischidanthus urceolatus is a species of flowering plant in the family Apocynaceae, native from south China (South-Central China, Southeast China, Hainan) to Vietnam. It was first described by Joseph Decaisne in 1844 as Marsdenia urceolata.
