= Secamonopsis =

Scientific classification
- Kingdom: Plantae
- Clade: Tracheophytes
- Clade: Angiosperms
- Clade: Eudicots
- Clade: Asterids
- Order: Gentianales
- Family: Apocynaceae
- Subfamily: Secamonoideae
- Genus: Secamonopsis; Jum.

Family of shrubs

Secamonopsis is a genus of shrubs in the Apocynaceae. It has only two species, both of which are endemic to Madagascar:

- Secamonopsis madagascariensis Jum.
- Secamonopsis microphylla Civeyrel & Klack
