= Sinomarsdenia =

Scientific classification
- Kingdom: Plantae
- Clade: Tracheophytes
- Clade: Angiosperms
- Clade: Eudicots
- Clade: Asterids
- Order: Gentianales
- Family: Apocynaceae
- Genus: Sinomarsdenia; P.T.Li & J.J.Chen (1997)
- Species: S. incisa

Binomial name
- Sinomarsdenia incisa (P.T.Li & Y.H.Li) P.T.Li & J.J.Chen (1997)

Synonyms
- Marsdenia incisa P.T.Li & Y.H.Li (1982)

Genus of flowering plants

Sinomarsdenia incisa is a species of flowering plant in the dogbane family, Apocynaceae. It is the sole species in genus Sinomarsdenia. It is a climber native to southern Yunnan Province, and possibly to Guangxi, in south-central China.

The species was first described as Marsdenia incisa in 1982 by Ping Tao Li and Y.H.Li. In 1997 it was renamed Sinomarsdenia incisa, and placed in its own monotypic genus.
