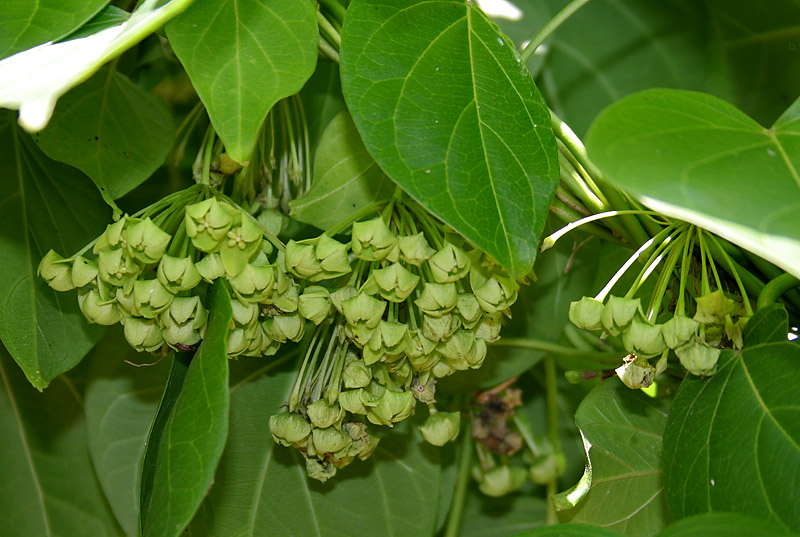

Scientific classification
- Kingdom: Plantae
- Clade: Embryophytes
- Clade: Tracheophytes
- Clade: Spermatophytes
- Clade: Angiosperms
- Clade: Eudicots
- Clade: Asterids
- Order: Gentianales
- Family: Apocynaceae
- Genus: Stephanotis
- Species: S. volubilis

Binomial name
- Stephanotis volubilis (L.f.) S.Reuss, Liede & Meve

Synonyms
- Asclepias volubilis L.f. (1782); Dregea viridiflora Fern.-Vill. (1880), nom. superfl.; Dregea volubilis (L.f.) Benth. ex Hook.f. (1883); Dregea volubilis var. viridiflora (Hassk.) Kuntze in Revis. Gen. Pl. 2: 419 (1891); Hoya viridiflora R.Br. (1810), nom. superfl.; Hoya volubilis (L.f.) Griff. (1854); Marsdenia volubilis (L.f.) T.Cooke (1904); Wattakaka viridiflora Hassk. (1854), nom. superfl.; Wattakaka volubilis (L.f.) Stapf in Bot. Mag. 148: t. 8976 (1923)

= Stephanotis volubilis =

Species of flowering plant

Stephanotis volubilis, synonyms including Dregea volubilis, is a species of plant in the family Apocynaceae that is native from north-east Pakistan eastwards to south China and southwards to Java.

== Regional names ==
Doodipaala (Telugu: దూదిపాల) in Telugu, Kodippaalai in Tamil, wattakakka in Malayalam, gwedauk (ဂွေးတောက်) in Myanmar (Burmese).

== Description ==
A stout tall climber, branches often pustular, with:

- Leaves: 3–6 inches long by 2–4 inches broad, rather coriaceous, base rounded or cordate; nerves 4–6 pairs; petiole 1–3 inches.
- Peduncles: 1–3 inches, rather slender; umbels drooping, very many-flowered, subglobose; pedicals 1/2 inch, slender.
- Corolla: 1/2 inch diameter, cupular, lobes triangular.
- Stigma dome-shaped.
- Follicles: 3/4 inch long by 1–1 and half inch diameter, broadly lanceolate, turgid, glabrous.
- Seeds: 2 inch long, broadly ovate, pale, smooth and shining, border thick.
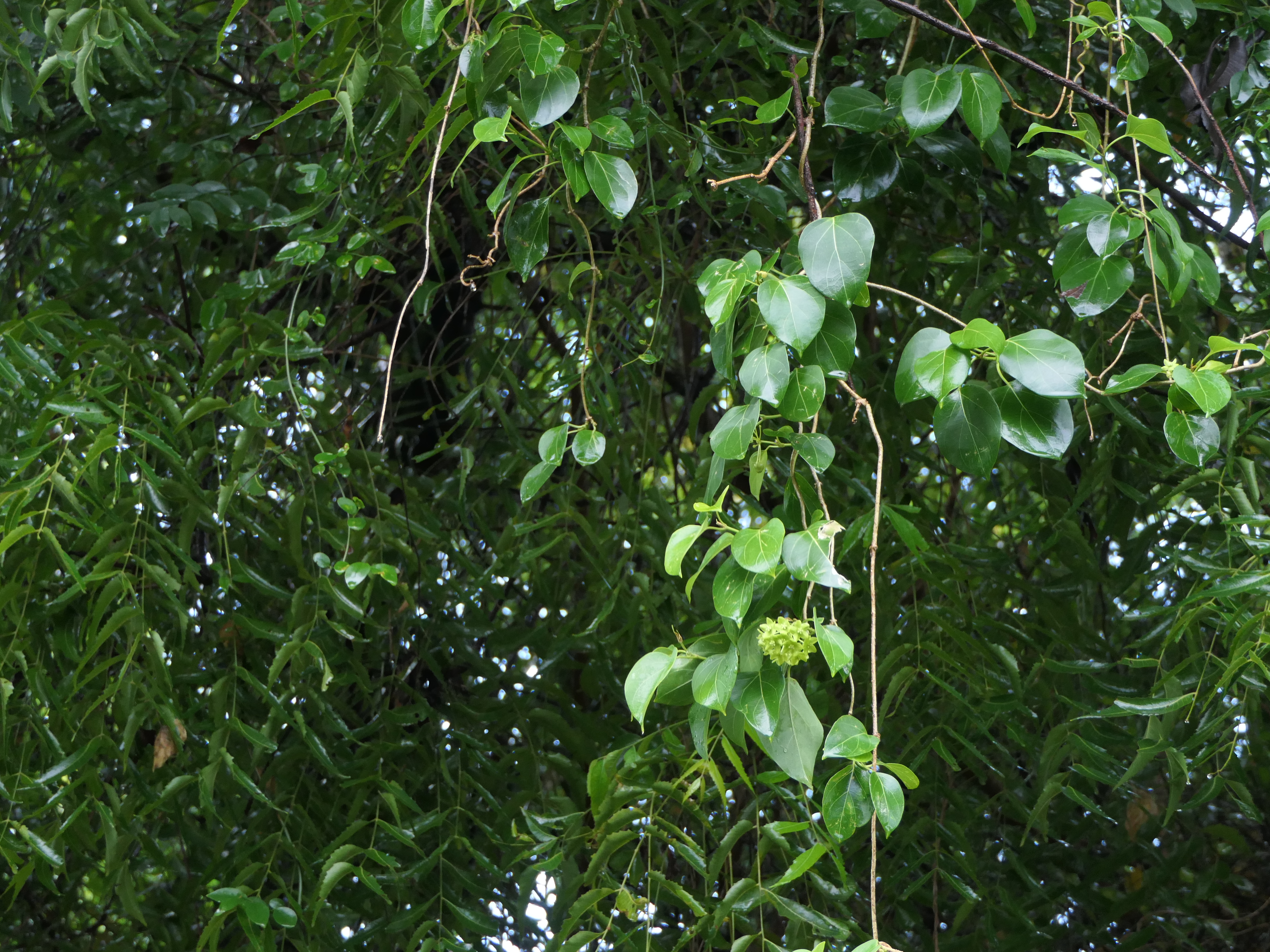
Climber

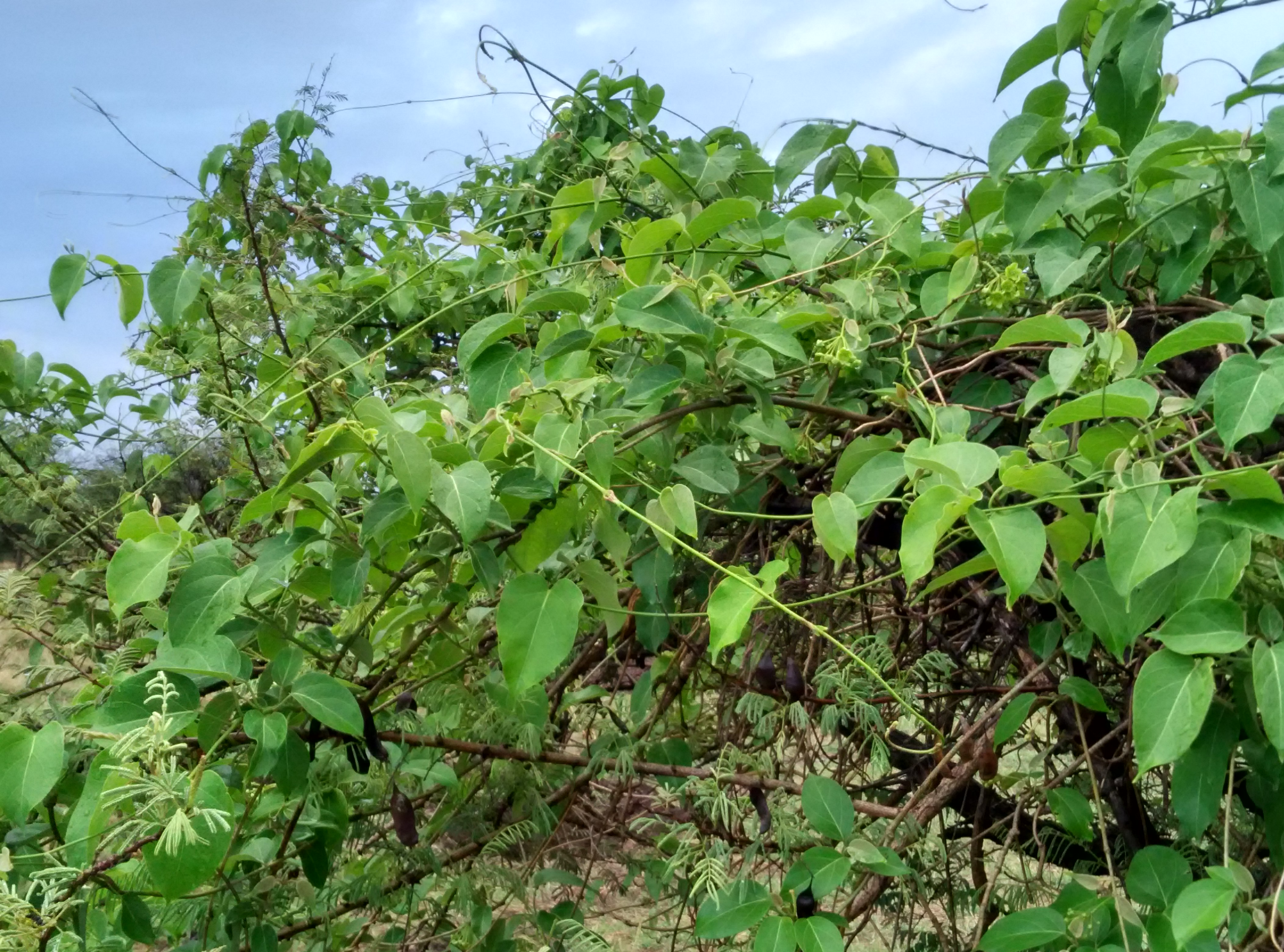
Bush

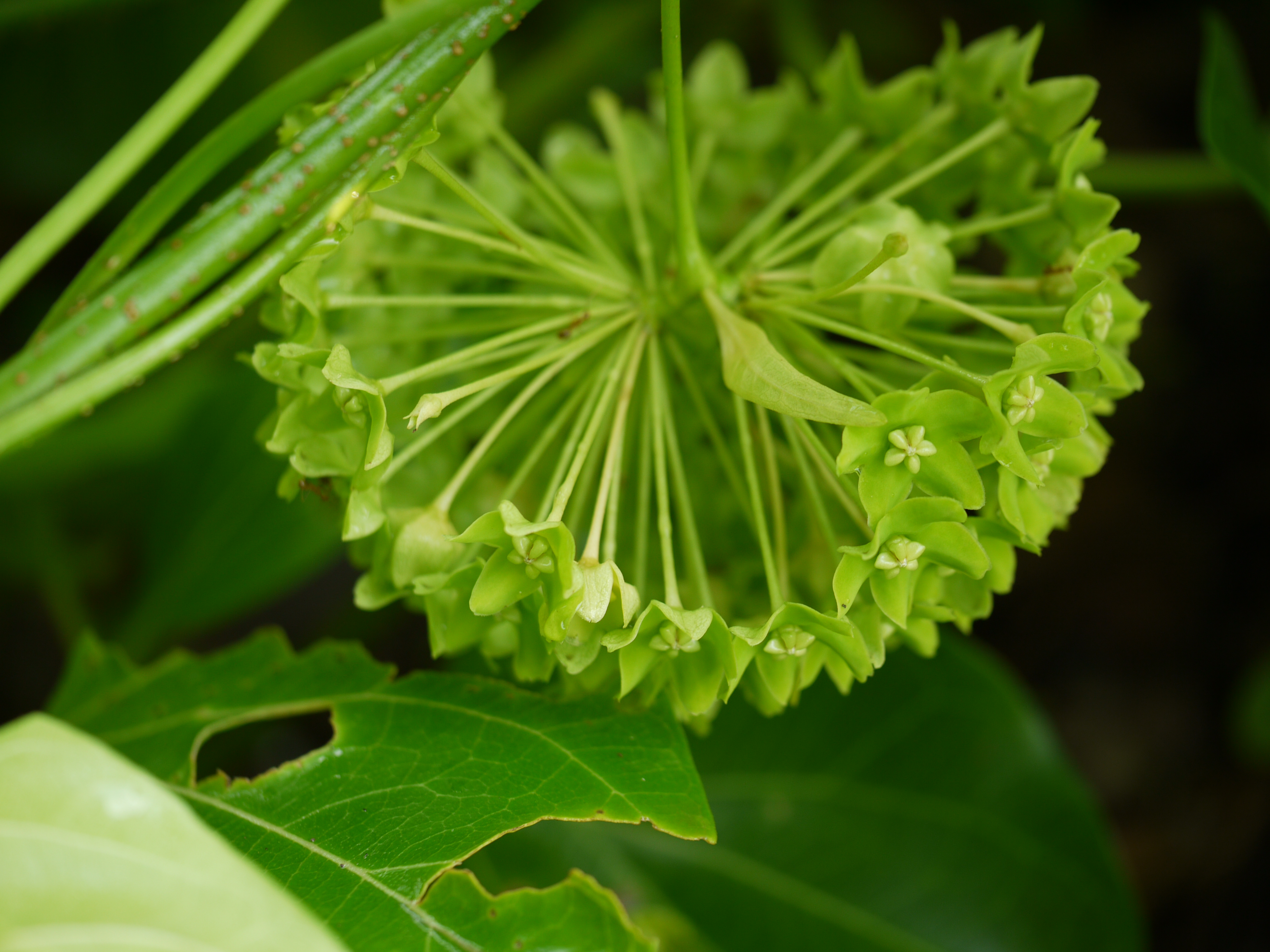
Inflorescence

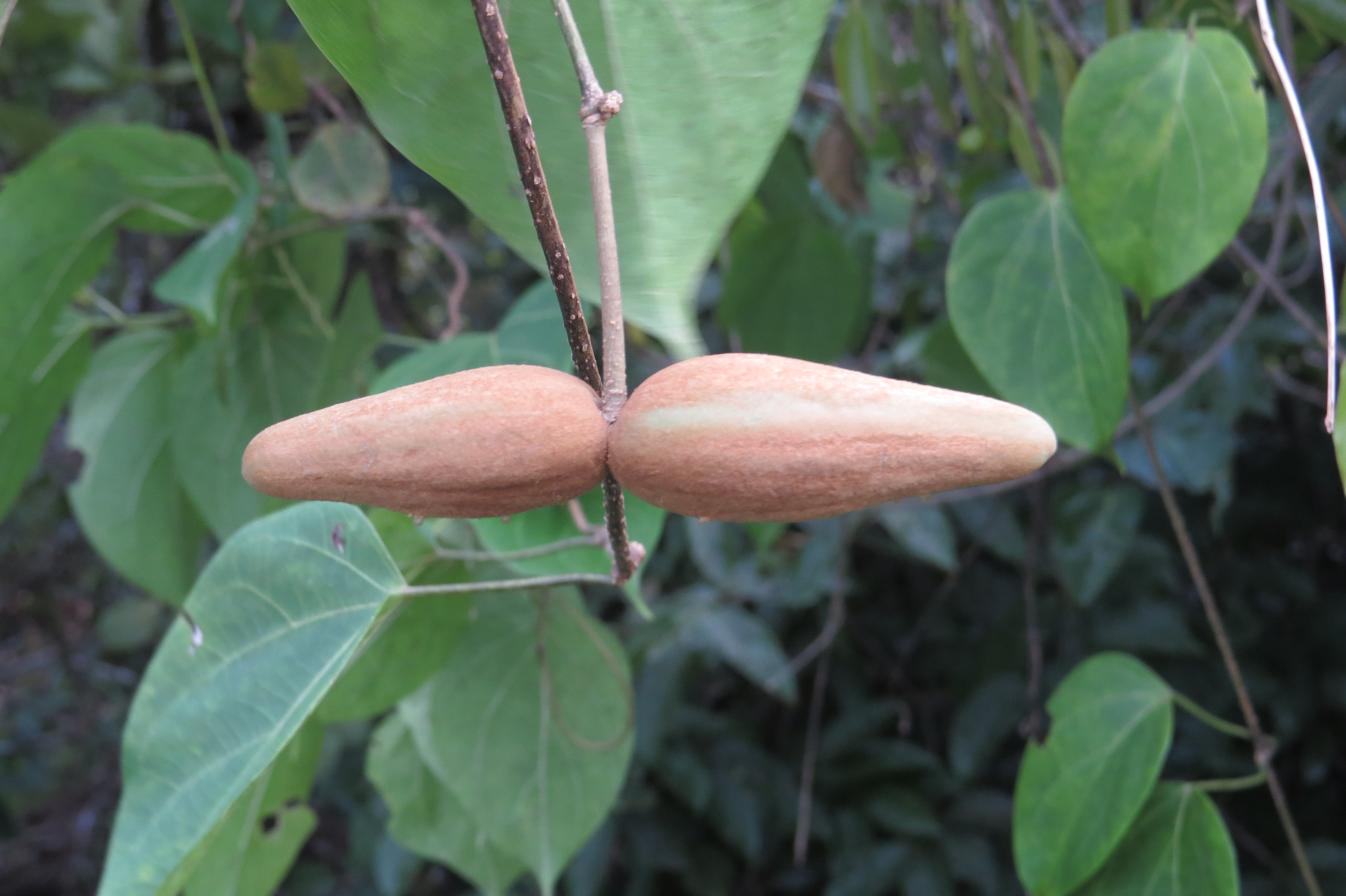
Fruit

== Distribution ==
Stephanotis volubilis has a very wide distribution in south China and tropical Asia. It is found throughout the Indian subcontinent (the Assam region, Bangladesh, the east and west Himalayas, the rest of India, Nepal, Pakistan and Sri Lanka); in southeast and south-central China and Taiwan; throughout Indochina (the Andaman Islands, Cambodia, Laos, Myanmar, the Nicobar Islands, Thailand and Vietnam); and in parts of Malesia (Java, Malaya and the Philippines). In India, the plant is distributed from Northwest India to Bengal, Assam and the Deccan Peninsula, and southwards from the Konkan. In Sri Lanka, it occurs in the hotter parts of the island.
