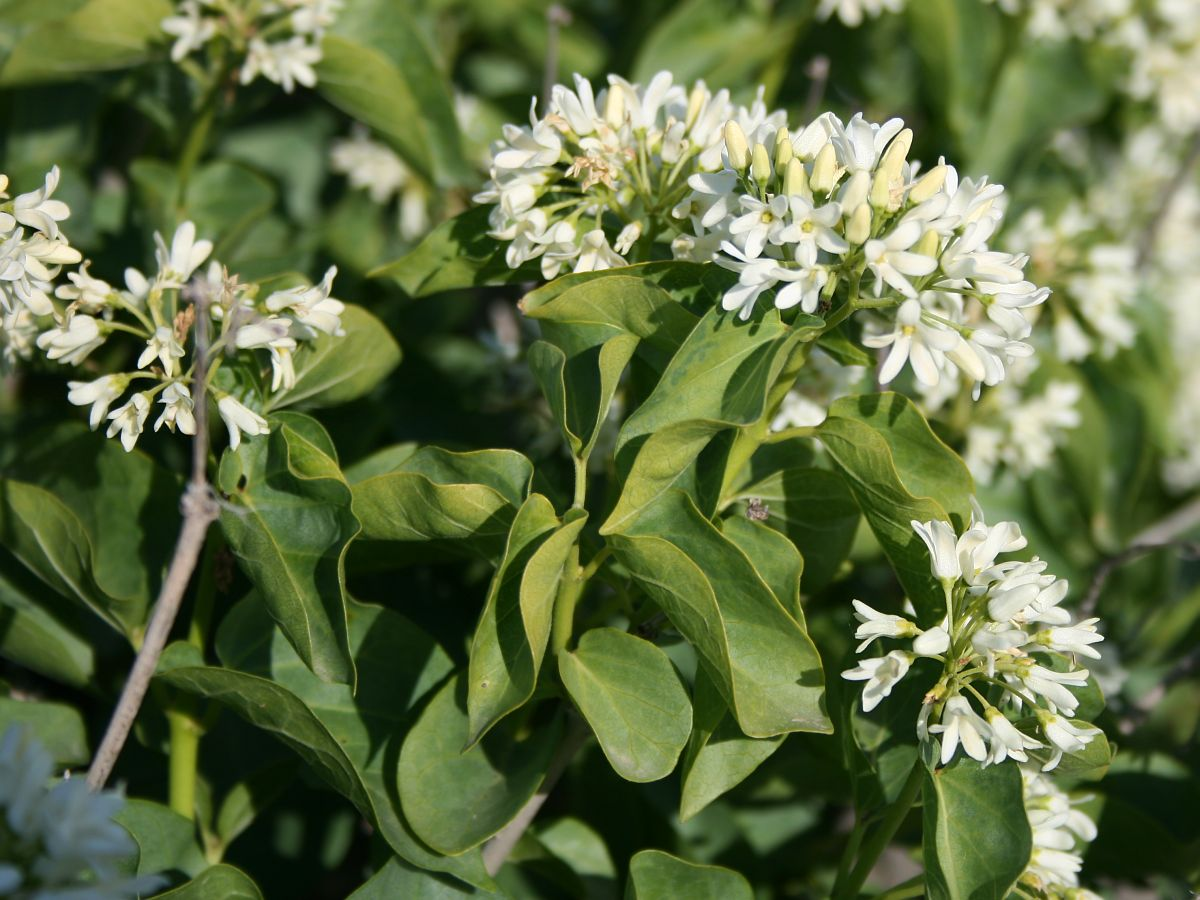
- Cionura erecta

Scientific classification
- Kingdom: Plantae
- Clade: Embryophytes
- Clade: Tracheophytes
- Clade: Angiosperms
- Clade: Eudicots
- Clade: Asterids
- Order: Gentianales
- Family: Apocynaceae
- Subfamily: Asclepiadoideae
- Tribe: Marsdenieae
- Genus: Cionura; Griseb.
- Species: C. erecta

Binomial name
- Cionura erecta (L.) Griseb.

Synonyms
- Cynanchum erectum L.; Cynanchum pallidum Salisb.; Cynanchum rectum Forssk. ex Decne.; Marsdenia erecta (L.) R. Br.; Pergularia erecta (L.) Spreng.

= Cionura =

Genus of plants

Cionura is a genus of perennial plants found through the Mediterranean regions, the South and Eastern parts of the Balkan Peninsula and Asia Minor to Afghanistan. It contains only one known species, Cionura erecta.

The plants are woody-stemmed, either upright or twining with numerous herbaceous sprawling stems and poisonous milky sap. The leaves are bright green and broadly ovate, 7–12 centimetres (2 3/4–4 3/4 in) long and 4–8 centimetres (1 9/16–3 1/8 in) wide. Large clusters of delicate fragrant white flowers are borne terminally from April to June. The plants bear fruits 8 centimetres (3 1/8 in) long, with a papery flap. The seeds have a wide marginal wing all around with a terminal tuft of long white silky hairs. Because it is a poisonous plant, goats and sheep do not approach it.
