= Secamonopsis madagascariensis =

Scientific classification
- Kingdom: Plantae
- Clade: Tracheophytes
- Clade: Angiosperms
- Clade: Eudicots
- Clade: Asterids
- Order: Gentianales
- Family: Apocynaceae
- Genus: Secamonopsis
- Species: S. madagascariensis

Binomial name
- Secamonopsis madagascariensis Jum.

Synonyms
- Marsdenia madagascariensis Costantin & Gallaud

Species of plant

Secamonopsis madagascariensis is a species of plant in the family Apocynaceae. It is endemic to Madagascar.
