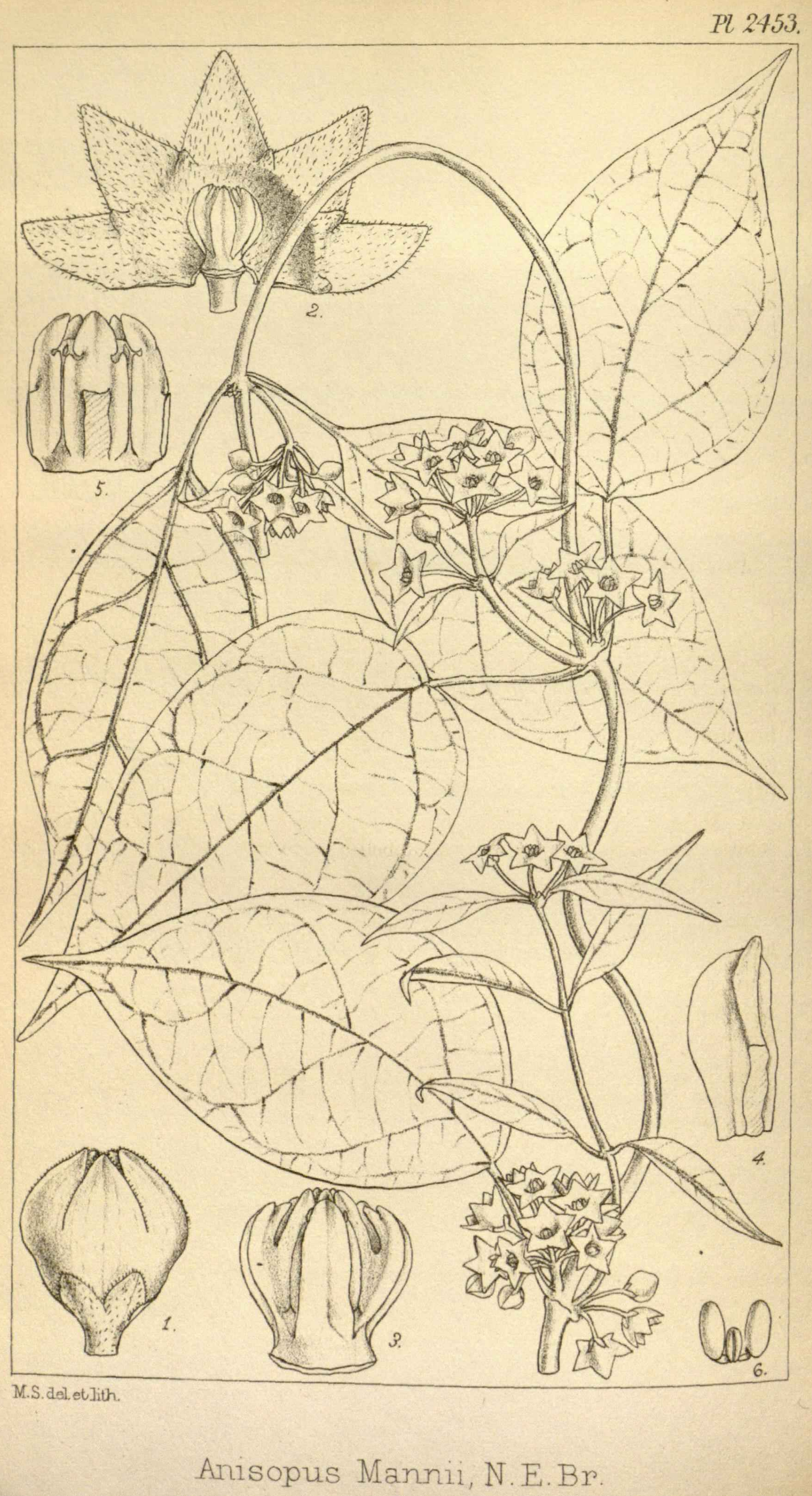
- Anisopus mannii lithograph by Matilda Smith.

Scientific classification
- Kingdom: Plantae
- Clade: Tracheophytes
- Clade: Angiosperms
- Clade: Eudicots
- Clade: Asterids
- Order: Gentianales
- Family: Apocynaceae
- Subfamily: Asclepiadoideae
- Tribe: Marsdenieae
- Genus: Anisopus; N.E.Br.

= Anisopus (plant) =

Genus of plants

Anisopus is a small genus of plants in the family Apocynaceae first described as a genus in 1895. It is native to tropical Africa.

Species

1. Anisopus bicoronata (K. Schum.) N.E. Br.
2. Anisopus efulensis (N.E.Br.) Goyder
3. Anisopus mannii N.E.Br.
4. Anisopus rostrifera (N.E. Br.) Bullock
