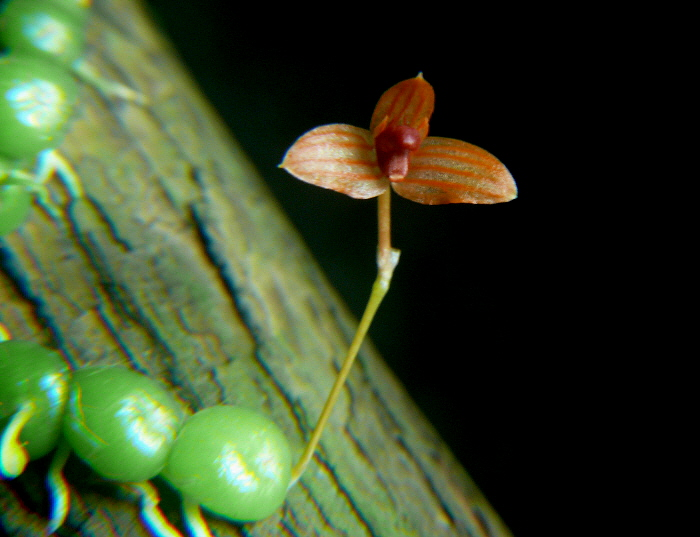
- Bulbophyllum moniliforme

Scientific classification
- Kingdom: Plantae
- Clade: Tracheophytes
- Clade: Angiosperms
- Clade: Monocots
- Order: Asparagales
- Family: Orchidaceae
- Subfamily: Epidendroideae
- Genus: Bulbophyllum
- Section: Bulbophyllum sect. Minutissima; Pfitzer 1889

Type species
- Bulbophyllum minutissimum F. Muell.

Species
- See text

Synonyms
- Bulbophyllum sect. Nematorhizis Schltr 1913

= Bulbophyllum sect. Minutissima =

Section of flowering plants

Bulbophyllum sect. Minutissima is a section of the genus Bulbophyllum.

== Description ==
Species in this section have a single flower.

== Distribution ==
Plants from this section are found in Southeast asia and Australia.

== Species ==
Bulbophyllum section Minutissima comprises the following species:

Image	Name	Distribution	Elevation (m)
	Bulbophyllum alagense Ames 1907	Philippines	400–500 metres (1,300–1,600 ft)
	Bulbophyllum ankerae J J Verm & O'Byrne 2011	Sulawesi	1,100–1,400 metres (3,600–4,600 ft)
	Bulbophyllum canlaonense Ames 1912	Philippines	1,300–2,300 metres (4,300–7,500 ft)
	Bulbophyllum cyclophyllum Schltr. 1913	New Guinea	700 metres (2,300 ft)
	Bulbophyllum flavicolor J.J.Sm. 1929	western New Guinea	1,420 metres (4,660 ft)
	Bulbophyllum globuliforme Nichols 1938	Australia (Queensland, New South Wales)	100–900 metres (330–2,950 ft)
	Bulbophyllum keekee N.Hallé 1977	New Caledonia	500–800 metres (1,600–2,600 ft)
	Bulbophyllum lemnifolium Schltr. 1913	New Guinea	1,000 metres (3,300 ft)
	Bulbophyllum lokonense Schltr. 1911	Sulawesi	1,300 metres (4,300 ft)
	Bulbophyllum maskeliyense Livera 1926	South India and Sri Lanka	
	Bulbophyllum microcala P.F.Hunt 1970	Papua New Guinea	100–1,100 metres (330–3,610 ft)
	Bulbophyllum microsphaerum Schltr. 1913	New Guinea	2,500 metres (8,200 ft)
	Bulbophyllum minutissimum F. Muell. 1878	Australia (Queensland, New South Wales), Laos, Cambodia, Vietnam, India, Myanmar and Thailand	20–500 metres (66–1,640 ft)
	Bulbophyllum moniliforme Par & Rchb.f 1874	Laos, Cambodia, Vietnam, India, Myanmar and Thailand	20–800 metres (66–2,625 ft)
	Bulbophyllum mucronatum (Blume) Lindl. 1830	Java, Borneo, Sulawesi	400–1,200 metres (1,300–3,900 ft)
	Bulbophyllum nematocaulon Ridl.1920	Vietnam, Malaysia, and Borneo	400–1,800 metres (1,300–5,900 ft)
	Bulbophyllum nematorhizis Schltr. 1913	New Guinea	400–1,800 metres (1,300–5,900 ft)
	Bulbophyllum oreocharis Schltr. 1913	New Guinea	1,000 metres (3,300 ft)
	Bulbophyllum pampangense Ames 1923	Philippines	500–1,000 metres (1,600–3,300 ft)
	Bulbophyllum peramoenum Ames 1913 publ. 1914	The Philippines (Mindoro and Leyte)	500–1,200 metres (1,600–3,900 ft)
	Bulbophyllum pygmaeum (Sm.) Lindl. 1830	New Zealand	
	Bulbophyllum tricarinatum Petch 1923	Sri Lanka	1,550 metres (5,090 ft)
	Bulbophyllum trinervium J.J.Sm. 1935	New Guinea	250 metres (820 ft)
	Bulbophyllum toppingii Ames 1913 publ. 1914	Philippines	1,500 metres (4,900 ft)
