= Milk vine =

Milk vine is a common name for several plants and may refer to:

- Leichhardtia species:
  - Leichhardtia flavescens, yellow milk vine, or hairy milk vine
  - Leichhardtia rostrata
- Marsdenia species:
  - Marsdenia fraseri, narrow-leaved milk vine
  - Marsdenia liisae, large-flowered milk vine
- Matelea species
