= Native potato =

Native potato may refer to any of several taxa of tuberous flora:

In Africa:

- Plectranthus rotundifolius

In Australia:

- Leichhardtia flavescens, Hairy milk vine, or native potato
- Ipomoea costata, Australian native bush potato
- Platysace spp.

United States:

- Apios americana, potato-like food crop

Potato subspecies and varieties:

- Andean potato, Solanum tuberosum andigena
- Chilean potato, Solanum tuberosum tuberosum
- See also: potato
