= Leichhardtia jensenii =

Conservation status
- Least Concern (NCA)

Scientific classification
- Kingdom: Plantae
- Clade: Tracheophytes
- Clade: Angiosperms
- Clade: Eudicots
- Clade: Asterids
- Order: Gentianales
- Family: Apocynaceae
- Genus: Leichhardtia
- Species: L. jensenii

Binomial name
- Leichhardtia jensenii (P.I.Forst.) P.I.Forst.
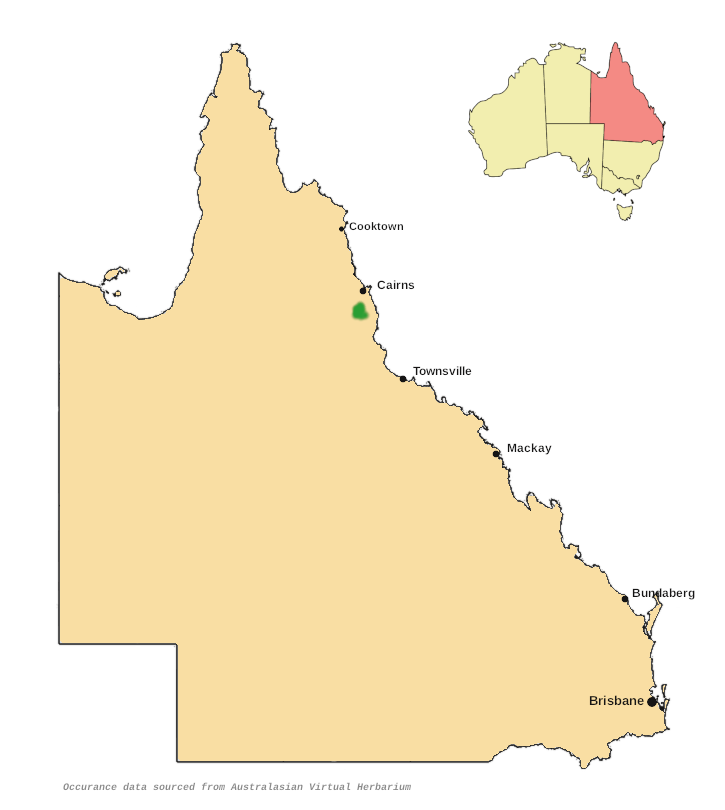

Synonyms
- Marsdenia jensenii P.I.Forst.

Species of flowering plant

Leichhardtia jensenii is a species of plant in the oleander and frangipani family Apocynaceae. It is endemic to the Wet Tropics bioregion of Queensland, Australia. First described as Marsdenia jensenii in 1997 by Australian botanist Paul Irwin Forster, he transferred it to the resurrected genus Leichhardtia in a review of Marsdenia in 2021.

== Description ==
Leichhardtia jensenii is a climbing plant with woody stems up to 5 cm (2.0 in) diameter. The leaves are about 21 cm (8.3 in) long and 11 cm (4.3 in) wide, and are attached to the twigs by petioles (leaf stems) about 7 cm (2.8 in) long. A milky white sap is produced when twigs or petioles are broken. Flowers are carried on an umbelliform inflorescence, and are about 20 mm (0.79 in) in diameter.

== Distribution and conservation ==
The plant has only been collected 18 times, mostly in the eastern parts of the Atherton Tableland, but despite this it has been given the conservation rating of least concern under the Queensland Government's Nature Conservation Act.
