= New Caledonia dry forests =

Terrestrial ecoregion of New Caledonia

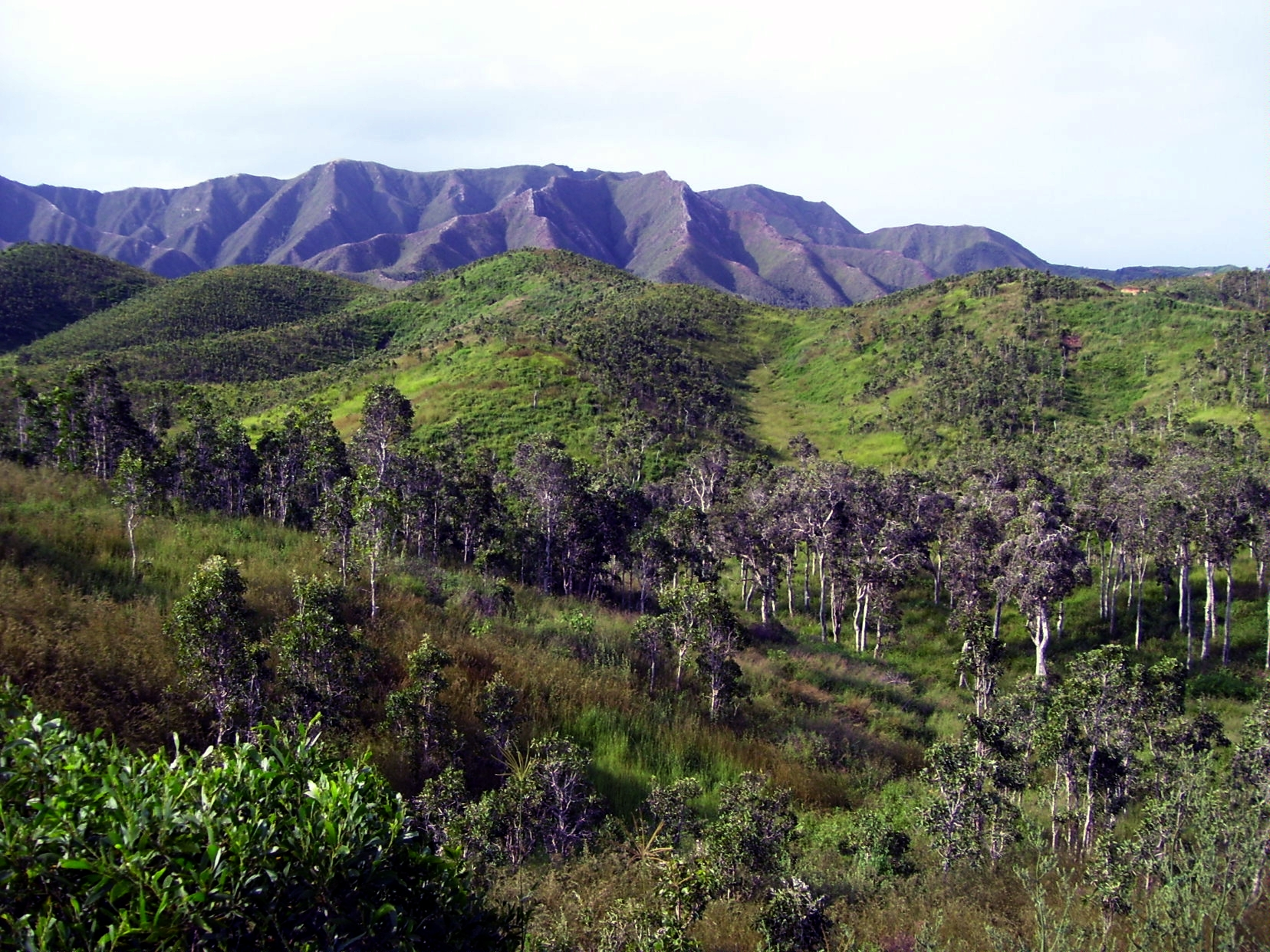
- Melaleuca savanna near Malabou

- Location of the New Caledonia dry forests

Ecology
- Realm: Australasian
- Biome: tropical and subtropical dry broadleaf forests
- Borders: New Caledonia rain forests

Geography
- Area: 4,129 km^{2} (1,594 sq mi)
- Country: France
- Overseas territory: New Caledonia
- Coordinates: 21.5°S 165.2°E

Conservation
- Conservation status: Critical/endangered
- Global 200: yes
- Protected: 2,451 km² (59%)

The New Caledonia dry forests is a tropical dry broadleaf forest ecoregion in New Caledonia, an overseas territory of France located in the South Pacific Ocean. The dry forests cover the western side of Grand Terre, New Caledonia's largest island.

== Geography ==
The New Caledonia dry forests cover an area of 4,129 km². Grand Terre extends northwest-southeast, and a long spine of mountains extend the length of the island. The dry forests lie in the drier rain shadow of mountains. The New Caledonia rain forests ecoregion covers the rest of the island, including the eastern slope and high mountains.

Nouméa, New Caledonia's capital and largest city, is located on the coast in the southern portion of the ecoregion.

== Flora ==
The natural vegetation of the ecoregion's lowlands is dense dry forest, also known as sclerophyll forest, with trees 5 to 15 meters high. The forests have a thick understory of shrubs and herbaceous plants, and numerous vines climb into the trees. Acacia spirorbis is a characteristic tree, and the introduced tree Leucaena leucocephala is often co-dominant. Other common trees include species of Canthium, Gardenia, Pittosporum, Dodonaea, and Premna. The cycad Cycas seemannii grows in stands on stabilized coastal dunes. The other conifers so characteristic of New Caledonia's rain forests don't occur in the dry forests.

The dry forests are home to 407 woody plant species, 243 of which are endemic to New Caledonia and 60 endemic to the dry forests. Dry-forest endemic trees include Ixora margaretae and Terminalia cherrieri.

== Protected areas ==
Frequent fires and clearance for agriculture and cattle raising have reduced the dry forest to scattered patches which cover only 2% of the ecoregion's land area. A 2017 assessment found that 2,451 km², or 59%, of the ecoregion is now in protected areas. Very little intact habitat remains outside the protected areas. The largest protected area is Zone Côtière Ouest National Park (2552.68 km²), which covers the central portion of the ecoregion and extends east into the rain forests ecoregion.
