= Pittosporum mackeei =

Conservation status
- Endangered (IUCN 3.1)

Scientific classification
- Kingdom: Plantae
- Clade: Tracheophytes
- Clade: Angiosperms
- Clade: Eudicots
- Clade: Asterids
- Order: Apiales
- Family: Pittosporaceae
- Genus: Pittosporum
- Species: P. mackeei

Binomial name
- Pittosporum mackeei Tirel & Veillon

Species of flowering plant

Pittosporum mackeei is a species of plant in the Pittosporaceae family. It is endemic to New Caledonia.

The species epithet, mackeei, honours Hugh Shaw MacKee, a botanist who collected for over 30 years in New Caledonia, and who collected the type specimen in the high valley of la Tchamba at an altitude of 150 metres on 10 May 1967.

== Description ==
P. mackeei flowers and fruits in March, April and May. The inflorescences consist of white flowers, forming an umbel and may be axillary or terminal. Its fruits are bivalve capsules, which are smooth or weakly warty.

== Conservation status ==
Pittosporum mackeei is an endangered species due to habitat loss. Pittosporum mackeei is an uncommon small tree, which occurs exclusively in the Ponérihouen area of New Caledonia at an altitude of 100 to 500 metres above sea level. Its area of occupancy is equal to 20 km² and its extent of occurrence to 428 km². It occurs in just five subpopulations each of which is threatened by Rusa Deer (Rusa timorensis). This deer is an invasive species thoroughly adapted to the ecosystems of New Caledonia, and the cause of the continuous decline in habitat quality of P. mackeei and other endemic plant species of New Caledonia's humid forests.
