= Terminalia cherrieri =

Conservation status
- Endangered (IUCN 3.1)

Scientific classification
- Kingdom: Plantae
- Clade: Tracheophytes
- Clade: Angiosperms
- Clade: Eudicots
- Clade: Rosids
- Order: Myrtales
- Family: Combretaceae
- Genus: Terminalia
- Species: T. cherrieri

Binomial name
- Terminalia cherrieri McKee

Species of flowering plant

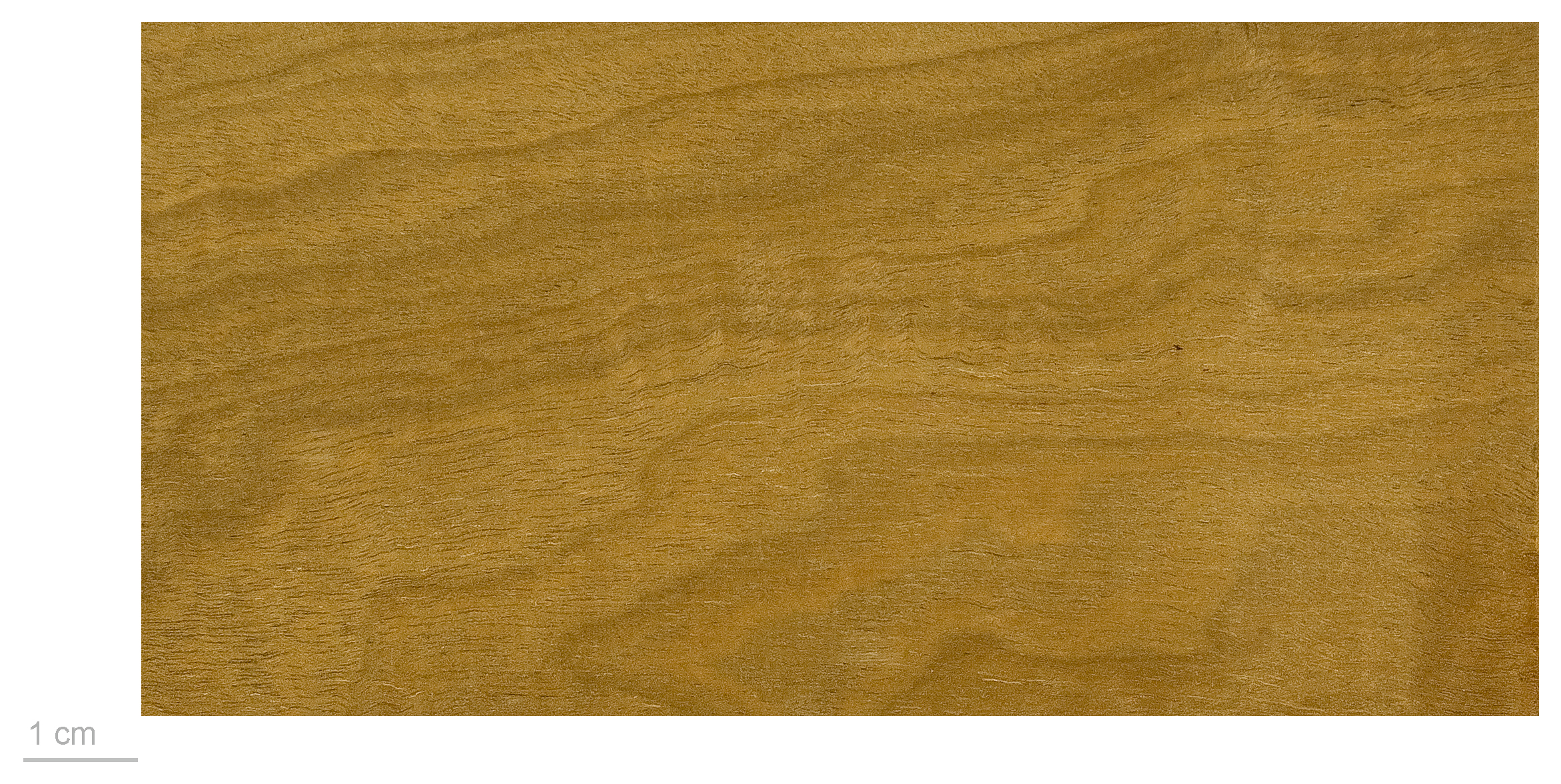
Terminalia cherrieri - MHNT

Terminalia cherrieri is a species of plant in the Combretaceae family. It is endemic to New Caledonia. It is threatened by habitat loss. The dry forest habitat of Terminalia cherrieri has been reduced by roughly 95% over the past 150 years, largely for agricultural use.
