= Leichhardtia archboldiana =

Scientific classification
- Kingdom: Plantae
- Clade: Tracheophytes
- Clade: Angiosperms
- Clade: Eudicots
- Clade: Asterids
- Order: Gentianales
- Family: Apocynaceae
- Genus: Leichhardtia
- Species: L. archboldiana

Binomial name
- Leichhardtia archboldiana (P.I.Forst.) P.I.Forst.

Species of plant

Leichhardtia archboldiana is a climbing plant in the Apocynaceae family, endemic to Papua New Guinea and Western New Guinea.

It was first described in 1995 by Paul Forster as Marsdenia archboldiana. In 2021, in a major revision of the Marsdenia genus, Forster placed the species in Leichhardtia, giving the accepted species name, Leichhardtia archboldiana.
