= Hugh Shaw MacKee =

- Born: 4 October 1912; Clough, Northern Ireland
- Died: 14 February 1995; Noumea, New Caledonia
- Citizenship: Australian
- Education: University of Belfast (1935), Oxford University (1938)
- Known for: Bryophytes, fungi, spermatophytes, palms
- Scientific career
- Fields: Botany

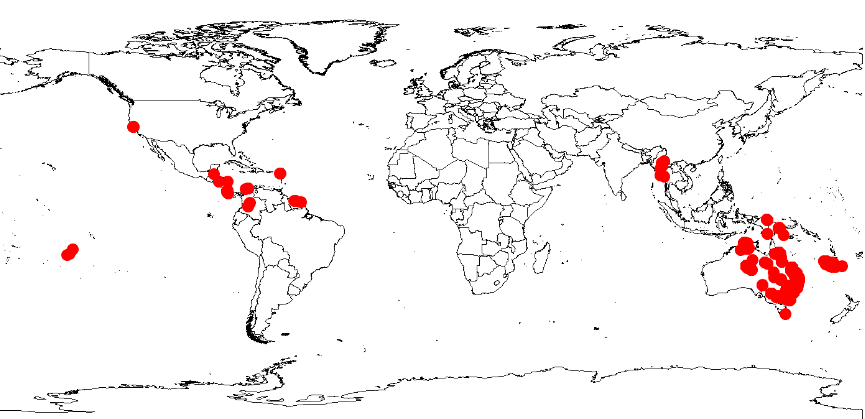
Collection data for Hugh Shaw MacKee from AVH

Hugh Shaw MacKee previously known as Hugh Shaw McKee (1912 – 1995) was a botanist who was born in Northern Ireland, but who collected in Australia and Oceania, and finally in New Caledonia, where together with his wife and other collaborators, he collected over 46,000 specimens.

== Education ==
Hugh Shaw McKee (later Hugh Shaw MacKee) earned a Bachelor of Botany in 1935 from the University of Belfast, and his doctorate in Plant Physiology in 1938 from Oxford University.

== Work ==
From 1935 to 1938 he worked in London for the South African Co-operative Deciduous Fruit Exchange. He left Europe in 1938 for Brisbane, Queensland, in Australia, to work in the Queensland Department of Agriculture.

In 1940 he was recruited by the CSIRO and with the defeat of the Japanese in New Guinea, he was seconded to the Tropical Scientific Section of the Australian Army to work in New Guinea. From 1954 to 1956 he was seconded to the South Pacific Commission with headquarters in Noumea, from where he made many collecting expeditions (Samoa, Fiji, the Solomon Islands and New Guinea. He was seconded to the FAO in Rangoon, Burma. Still employed by CSIRO, he collected for nine months in tropical America. (Possibly) later, he was worked in the Botany Department of Sydney University. In 1954-55 he went to New Guinea to look into food and nutrition problems. In 1964 he was recruited by the CNRS to work in New Caledonia, where he remained for the rest of his life, collecting and working, and it was there he changed his name from McKee to MacKee to make it easier for French speakers to know how to say his name.

== Publications ==
=== Books ===
- 1985. Les Plantes introduites et cultivees en Nouvelle-Caledonie : supplement a la Flore de la Nouvelle-Caledonie et Dependances (volume hors-serie) Paris, Museum National d'Histoire Naturelle
- 1984. Morat, P., J.-M. Veillon, J.-M., Mackee, H.S. (Conference Proceedings) Floristic relationships of New Caledonian rain forest phanerogams, Association of Systematics Collections and the Bernice P. Bishop Museum.
- 1981 (with M.E. MacKee) E. Vieillard et E. Deplanche, deux grands botanistes collecteurs en Nouvelle-Calédonie,
- 1969. A list of vascular plants occurring on Black Mountain and environs : Canberra, A.C.T. M. Gray and H.S. McKee. Melbourne, C.S.I.R.O.
- 1967. Aubréville, A., Leroy, J.F., Morat, P., & MacKee, H.S. Flore de la Nouvelle-Calédonie et dépendances.
- 1962. (as Hugh Shaw McKee) Nitrogen metabolism in plants. Oxford, Clarendon Press.
- 1954. Australian and New Zealand botany, J.McLuckie and H.S.McKee. Sydney : Associated General Publications.

=== Articles ===
- Morat, P., Veillon, J.M., & MacKee, H.S. (1984). Floristic relationships of New Caledonian rain forest phanerogams (pp. 71–128). Association of Systematics Collections and the Bernice P. Bishop Museum.PDF Telopea 2(6): 631-679 (1986)
- Jaffré, T., Morat, P., Veillon, J. M., & MacKee, H.S. (1987). Changements dans la végétation de la Nouvelle-Calédonie au cours du Tertiaire: la végétation et la flore des roches ultrabasiques. Adansonia, 4, 365-391.
- Morat, P., Jaffré, T., Veillon, J.M., & MacKee, H.S. (1986). Affinités floristiques et considérations sur l’origine des maquis miniers de la Nouvelle-Calédonie. Adansonia, 2, 133-182.

== Names published ==
(incomplete list)

- Terminalia cherrieri MacKee Bull. Mus. Natl. Hist. Nat., B, Adansonia Sér. 4, 6(2): 116. 1984
- Grevillea evansiana MacKee Proceedings of the Linnean Society of New South Wales 78(3-4) 1953
- Cyclophyllum jasminifolium Guillaumin & MacKee—Cah. Pacifique 9: 54. 1966
- Microsemma calophylla Guillaumin & MacKee—Mem. Mus. Hist. Nat., Paris, Ser. Bot. viii. 127 (1959) (synonym of Solmsia calophylla Baill. Adansonia 10: 38 (1871)

== Plants named in his honour ==
(source)

- Pittosporum mackeei See endemia.nc Pittosporum mackeei.
- Plerandra mackeei See endemia.nc Plerandra mackeei.
- Codia mackeeana See endemia.nc C. mackeeana.
- Bulbophyllum keekee See endemia.nc B. keekee.
- Solanum hugonis See endemia.nc S. hugonis.
- Leichhardtia mackeeorum (syn. Marsdenia mackeeorum) – includes his wife Margaret E. MacKee. See endemia.nc M. mackeeorum.
