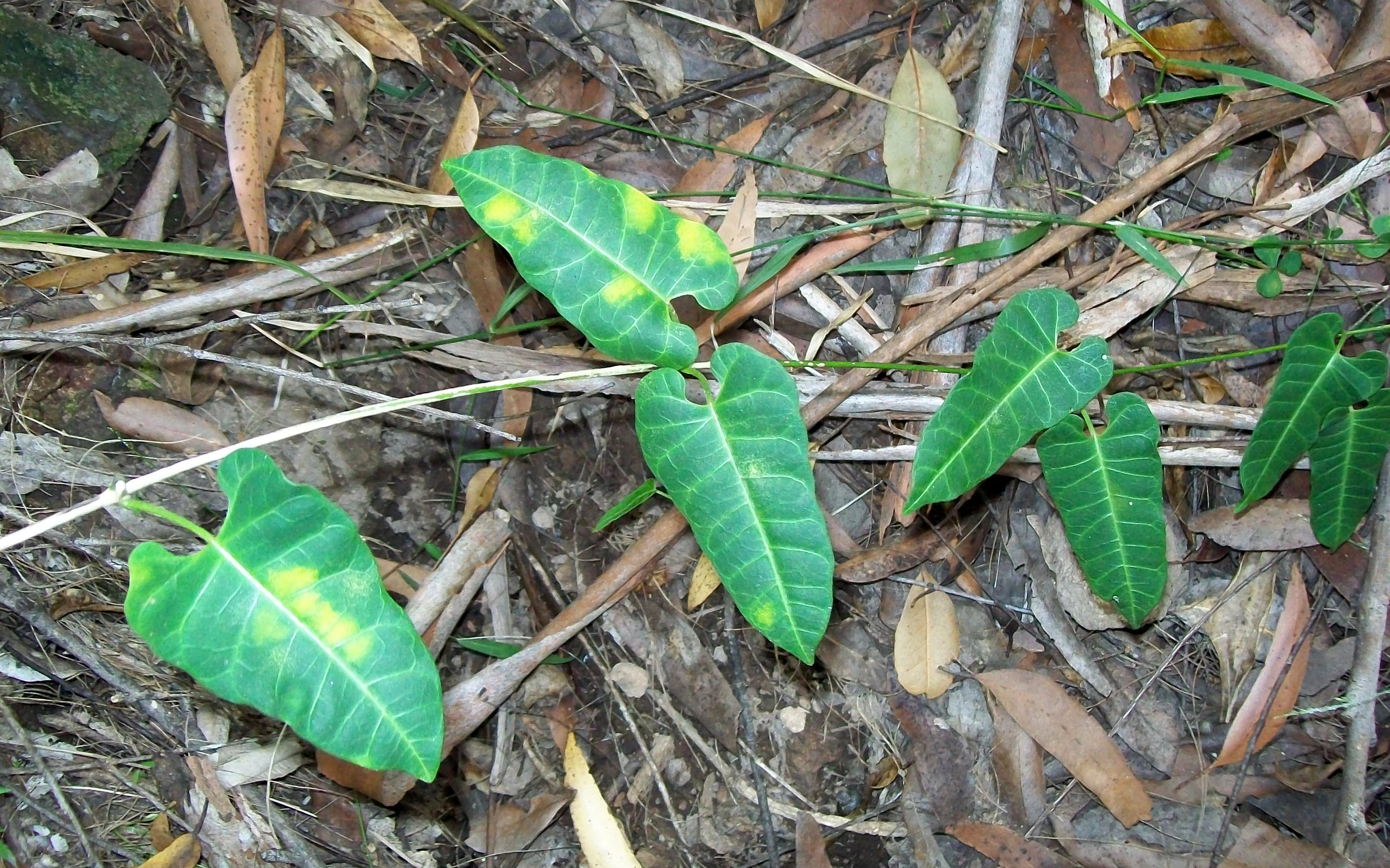
- Kerewong State Forest, Australia

Scientific classification
- Kingdom: Plantae
- Clade: Tracheophytes
- Clade: Angiosperms
- Clade: Eudicots
- Clade: Asterids
- Order: Gentianales
- Family: Apocynaceae
- Genus: Leichhardtia
- Species: L. lloydii

Binomial name
- Leichhardtia lloydii (P.I.Forst.) P.I.Forst.

Synonyms
- Marsdenia lloydii P.I.Forst.; Marsdenia suberosa S.T.Blake, nom. illeg.

= Leichhardtia lloydii =

Corky marsdenia

Species of plant

Leichhardtia lloydii, synonym Marsdenia lloydii, is a climbing plant found in eastern Australia (New South Wales, Queensland). It is known as the corky marsdenia. This member of the dogbane family exudes white sap when leaves are broken from the stem. The stems have a white fissured corky covering. This plant is found in and around drier rainforest areas, north from Gloucester, New South Wales.
