= Leichhardtia tubulosa =

Scientific classification
- Kingdom: Plantae
- Clade: Tracheophytes
- Clade: Angiosperms
- Clade: Eudicots
- Clade: Asterids
- Order: Gentianales
- Family: Apocynaceae
- Genus: Leichhardtia
- Species: †L. tubulosa

Binomial name
- †Leichhardtia tubulosa (F.Muell.) P.I.Forst.

Synonyms
- Marsdenia tubulosa F.Muell.

Species of plant

Leichhardtia tubulosa is a species of plant of unknown habit in the dogbane family, first described by Ferdinand von Mueller in 1875 as Marsdenia tubulosa. It is endemic to Australia's subtropical Lord Howe Island in the Tasman Sea. It is known only from a single collection, made in 1871 on the summit of Mount Gower, and is believed to be extinct.

== Description ==
The plant has semi-circular leaves about 45 mm long and small tubular flowers. The specific epithet refers to the tubular corollas. The appearance of the fruit is unknown.
