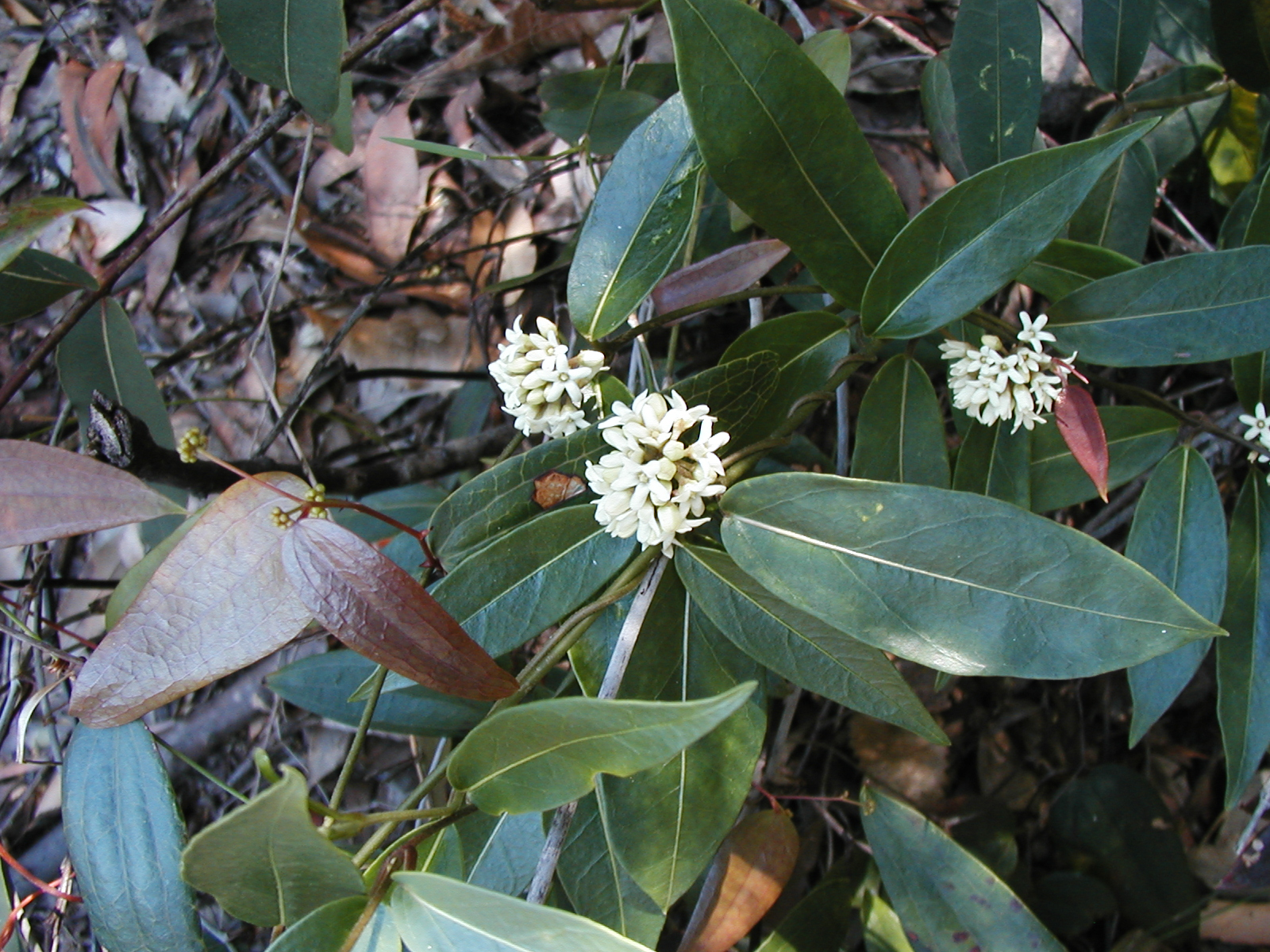
- At Oatley

Scientific classification
- Kingdom: Plantae
- Clade: Tracheophytes
- Clade: Angiosperms
- Clade: Eudicots
- Clade: Asterids
- Order: Gentianales
- Family: Apocynaceae
- Genus: Leichhardtia
- Species: L. suaveolens

Binomial name
- Leichhardtia suaveolens (R.Br.) P.I.Forst.

Synonyms
- Marsdenia suaveolens R.Br.; Pergularia suaveolens (R.Br.) Spreng.)

= Leichhardtia suaveolens =

Scented milk vine

Species of plant

Leichhardtia suaveolens, synonym Marsdenia suaveolens, commonly known as the scented milk vine, is a small vine found in New South Wales, Australia. It is found in a variety of habitats in relatively high rainfall areas, from Bega to Port Macquarie. The original specimen was collected at Sydney on 11 May 1802.

== Description ==
Leichhardtia suaveolens grows as a vine in forest or small upright shrub in heathland, reaching 1 m (3 ft) high. The stem is up to 3 mm (1/8 in) in diameter, and the internodes are up to 17 cm (6 3/4 in). The plant exudes a white milky sap when cut or damaged. The (oppositely arranged) leaves arise in pairs off the stem. The dark green, spear-shaped (lanceolate to oblong-lanceolate) leaves have rounded bases and measure 2–7 cm (3/4–2 3/4 in) long by 0.6–2.5 cm (1/4–1 in) wide. The leaf margins roll downwards. The cream-white flowers appear from October to February, being most abundant in December, and are 3–8 mm (1/8–3/8 in) across and 3–5 mm (1/8–1/4 in) long. They are arranged in umbels. The peduncles are 1–3.5 cm (3/8–1 3/8 in) long. Fruiting takes place 2–3 months after flowering. The seed pods are narrow with a tapered tip, and are 5–10 cm (2–4 in) cm long by 0.8–1.4 cm (1/4–1/2 in) wide. They open to release the feathery seeds from August to January. The seeds are then blown away by the wind.

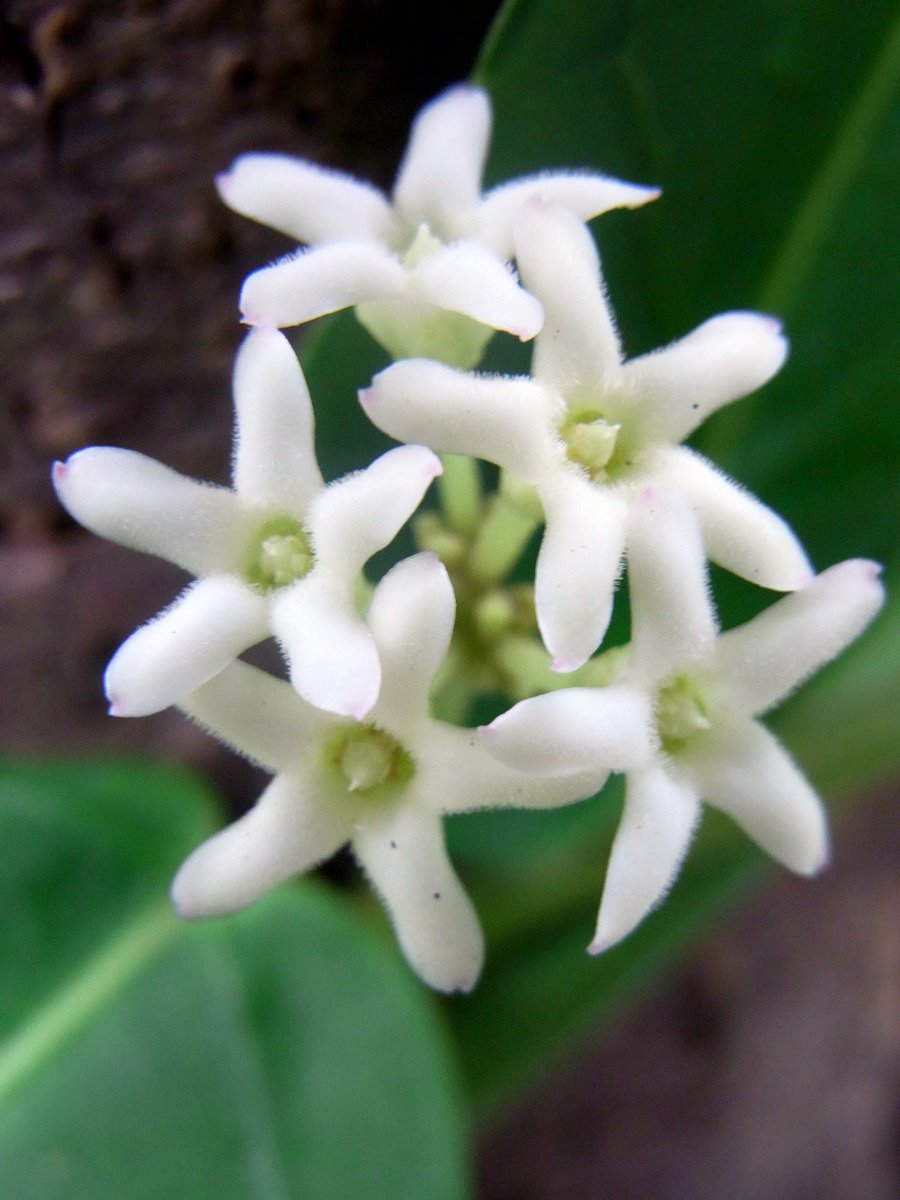
Closeup of flower

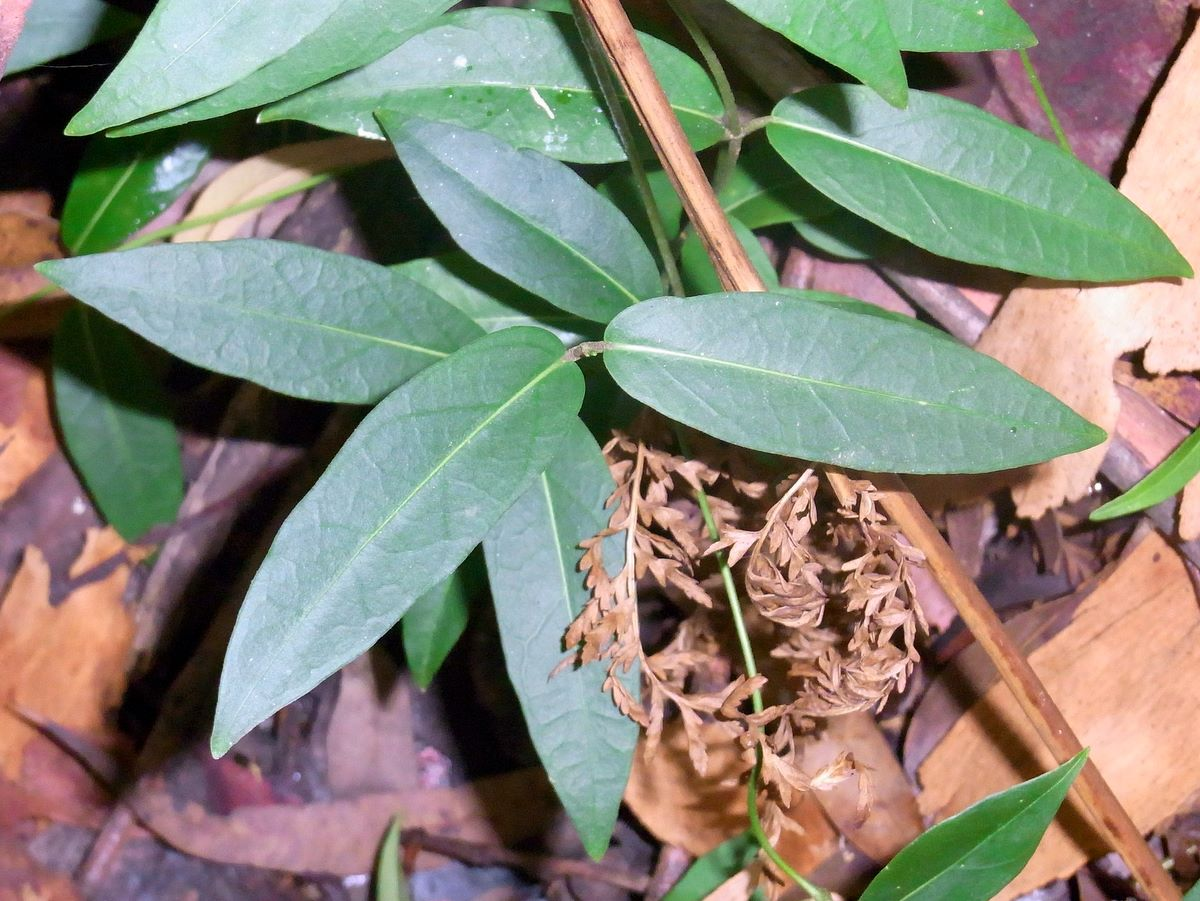
Leaves

== Taxonomy ==
The specific epithet suaveolens is from Latin, and it refers to the uniquely sweet scented flowers. In 1810, this species first appeared in scientific literature, in the Prodromus Florae Novae Hollandiae, authored by the prolific Scottish botanist, Robert Brown. Kurt Sprengel placed it in the genus Pergularia in 1824, and it was moved to the genus Leichhardtia in 2021.

== Distribution and habitat ==
The species ranges from Port Macquarie to Bega in eastern New South Wales. It grows in wet sclerophyll forest in association with such species as turpentine (Syncarpia glomulifera), Sydney peppermint (Eucalyptus piperita) and blackbutt (E. pilularis), generally on sandy alluvial soils. It is also found in dry sclerophyll forest with red bloodwood (Corymbia gummifera), stiff-leaf wattle (Acacia obtusifolia) and paperbark tea-tree (Leptospermum trinervium), and can be found in rainforest gullies. The yearly rainfall is over 800 mm.

== Ecology ==
Leichhardtia suaveolens resprouts after bushfire, and has been recorded setting fruit five months after a burn.

Leichhardtia suaveolens is foraged upon by caterpillars of the common crow (Euploea core).

== Cultivation ==
In 1820, The Botanical Register reported that Leichhardtia suaveolens (then known as Marsdenia suaveolens) flowered in the United Kingdom in Colville Nursery in Chelsea. The flower's fragrance was greatly praised and compared to that of Heliotropium peruvianum (now Heliotropium arborescens). It can be grown in well-drained soil in a spot with some shelter in the garden.
