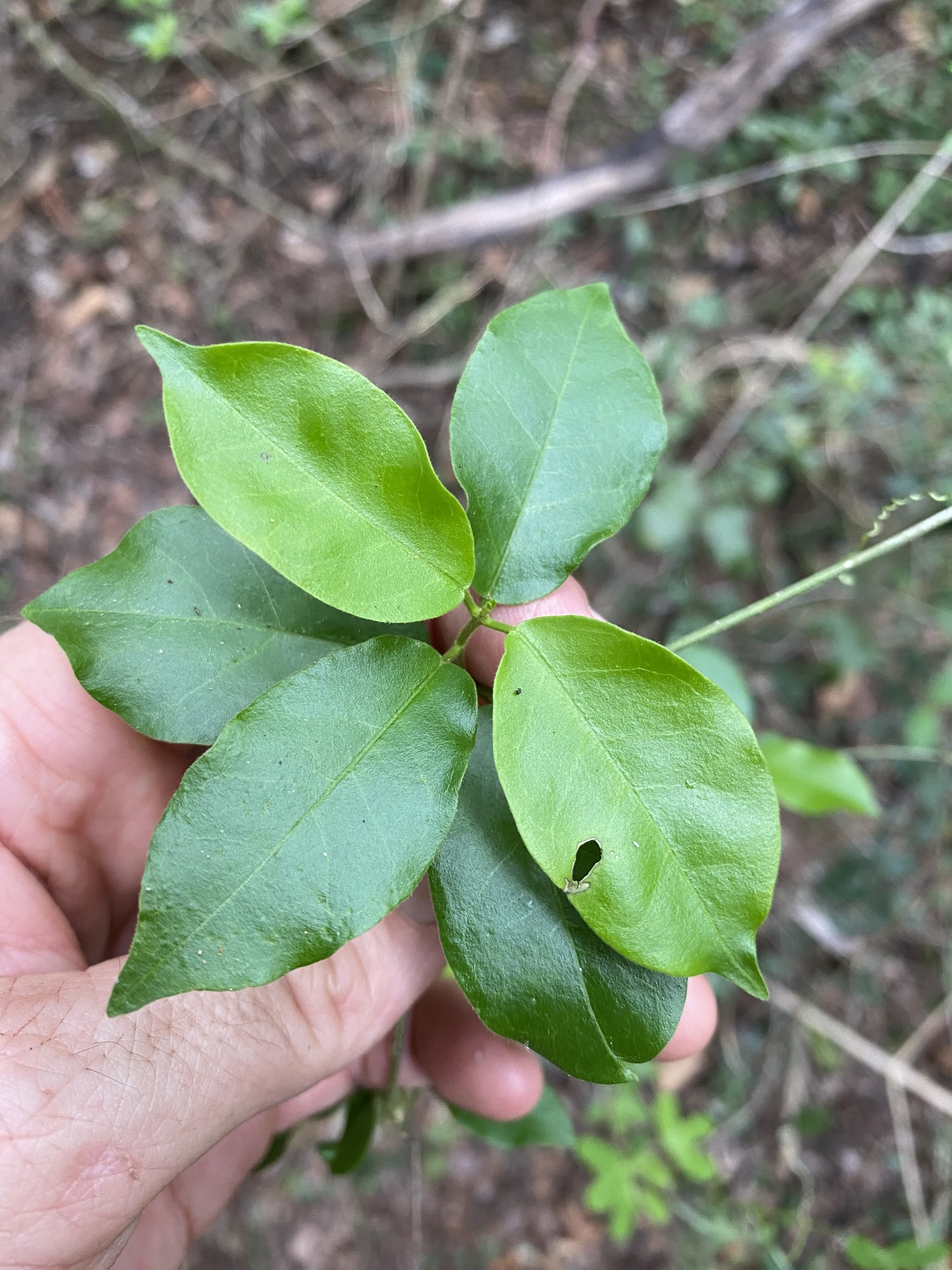

Conservation status
- Least Concern (NCA)

Scientific classification
- Kingdom: Plantae
- Clade: Tracheophytes
- Clade: Angiosperms
- Clade: Eudicots
- Clade: Asterids
- Order: Gentianales
- Family: Apocynaceae
- Genus: Leichhardtia
- Species: L. micradenia

Binomial name
- Leichhardtia micradenia P.I.Forst.

Synonyms
- Gongronema micradenia (Benth.) F.Muell.; Gymnema micradenium Benth.; Marsdenia micradenia (Benth.) P.I.Forst.

= Leichhardtia micradenia =

Species of flowering plant

Leichhardtia micradenia is a species of plant in the oleander and frangipani family Apocynaceae endemic to Queensland, Australia. It is a small vine with leaves about 5 cm (2.0 in) long and 2 cm (0.79 in) wide, growing in drier types of rainforest from the Mount Windsor National Park northwest of Port Douglas, to the area around Warwick, southwest of Brisbane. It has been given the conservation status of least concern.
