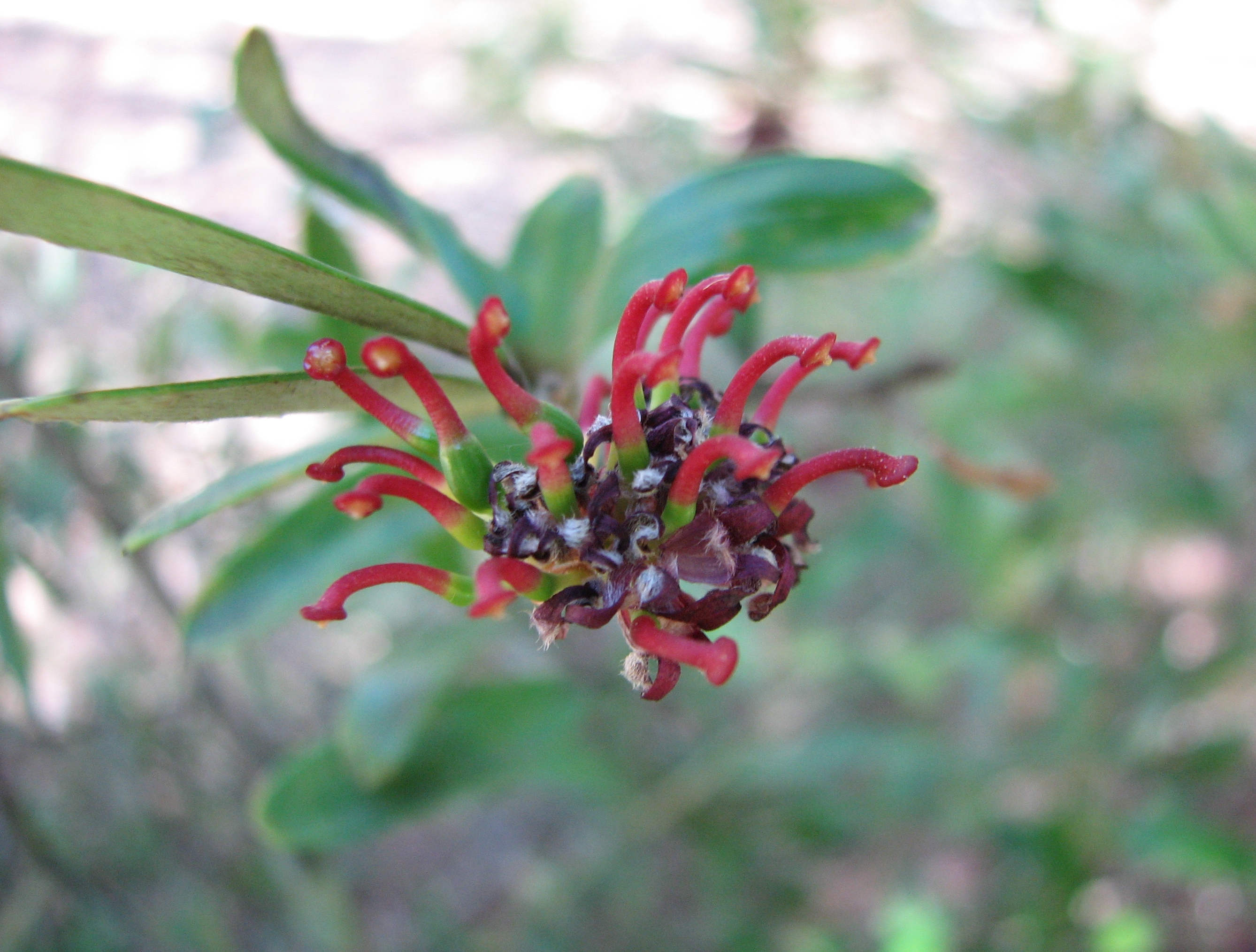
- In Maranoa Gardens

Conservation status
- Least Concern (IUCN 3.1)

- Vulnerable (EPBC Act)

Scientific classification
- Kingdom: Plantae
- Clade: Embryophytes
- Clade: Tracheophytes
- Clade: Spermatophytes
- Clade: Angiosperms
- Clade: Eudicots
- Order: Proteales
- Family: Proteaceae
- Genus: Grevillea
- Species: G. evansiana

Binomial name
- Grevillea evansiana MacKee

Synonyms
- Grevillea diffusa subsp. evansiana (MacKee) McGill.

= Grevillea evansiana =

Species of shrub endemic to Australia

Grevillea evansiana, commonly known as Evans grevillea, is a species of flowering plant in the family Proteaceae and is endemic to a restricted area of New South Wales. It is a low, dense, spreading shrub with elliptic leaves and usually blackish-red flowers with a burgundy-coloured style.

== Description ==
Grevillea evansiana is a low, dense, spreading shrub that typically grows to a height of up to 50 cm (20 in), rarely to 1.5 m (4 ft 11 in) and has branchlets covered with white, woolly hairs. Its leaves are usually elliptic, 25–60 mm (0.98–2.36 in) long and 3–10 mm (0.12–0.39 in) wide, the lower surface sillky-hairy. The flowers are arranged in more or less spherical clusters, usually on a peduncle 5–15 mm (0.20–0.59 in) long, on the ends of branchlets. The flowers are usually blackish-red with a burgundy style, rarely white with a greenish-cream style, the pistil 9–10 mm (0.35–0.39 in) long and the style strongly curved. Flowering occurs from August to December and the fruit is a glabrous, oblong follicle 10–12 mm (0.39–0.47 in) long.

== Taxonomy ==
Grevillea evansiana was first formally described in 1953 by Hugh Shaw MacKee in Proceedings of the Linnean Society of New South Wales from specimens he collected near the Cudgegong River in the Rylstone area in 1951. The specific epithet (evansiana) honours Obed David Evans.

== Distribution and habitat ==
Evans grevillea usually grows in forest or woodland, sometimes in swampy heath and is only known from east of Rylstone in New South Wales.

== Conservation status ==
Grevillea evansiana has two vastly different conservation statuses.

It is listed as vulnerable under the Australian Government Environment Protection and Biodiversity Conservation Act 1999 and the New South Wales Biodiversity Conservation Act 2016.

However, under an assessment published in 2020 by the International Union for Conservation of Nature, it has been listed as least concern. Although it has a limited range, its population is assumed stable and its threats are not major enough to warrant a threatened or near-threatened category. Altered fire regimes causing too frequent wildfires could pose a threat to some of the species' populations.

Both the IUCN and the EPBC Act have identified habitat disturbance and trampling from recreational activities as a threat to the species.
