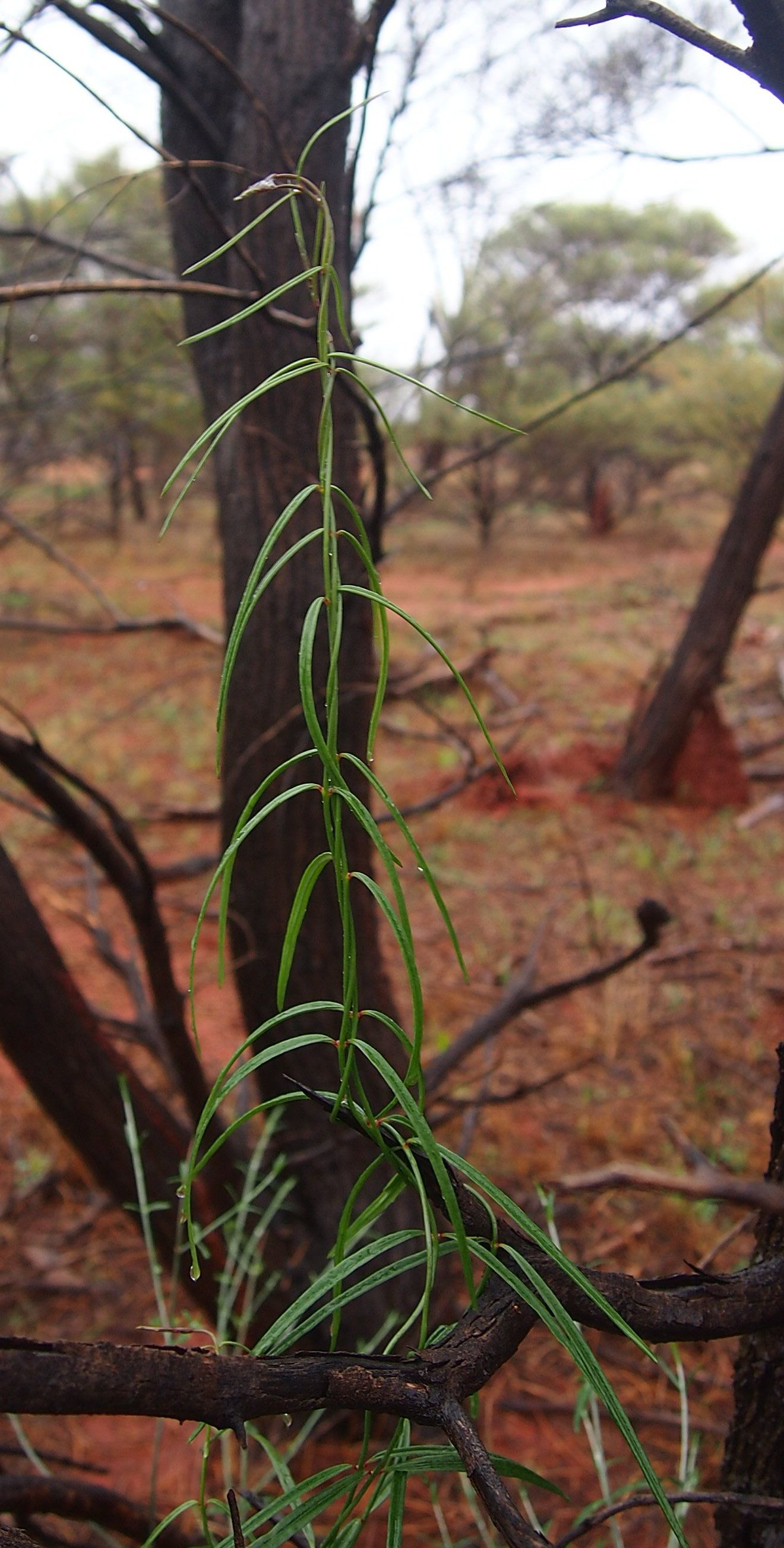

Scientific classification
- Kingdom: Plantae
- Clade: Tracheophytes
- Clade: Angiosperms
- Clade: Eudicots
- Clade: Asterids
- Order: Gentianales
- Family: Apocynaceae
- Genus: Leichhardtia
- Species: L. australis

Binomial name
- Leichhardtia australis R.Br. (1849)

Synonyms
- Marsdenia australis (R.Br.) Druce (1917); Marsdenia leichhardtiana F.Muell. (1866), nom. superfl.

= Leichhardtia australis =

Species of plant

Leichhardtia australis, commonly known as the bush banana, silky pear or green vine is an Australian native plant. It is found in Central Australia and throughout Western Australia. It is a bush tucker food used by Indigenous Australians.

L. australis has many different names in Aboriginal languages. In the Arrernte language of Central Australia; merne alangkwe (older transcription: elonka), merne ulkantyerrknge (the flowers) and merne altyeye (the prefix merne signifies plant food). In Karrajari, Nyulnyul and Yawuru it is called 'Magabala'. The Walmajarri people call it Kurlipi. The small fruits are called amwerterrpe. Kalgoorlie and Karlkurla (one of its suburbs) both take their names from a Wangai word meaning "place of the silky pears".

== Edibility ==
All parts of the bush banana plant are still eaten in the desert region by indigenous communities today.

The flowers hang in clusters and can also be eaten raw, as can the main part of the plant (altyeye in Arrernte). Some people suck the nectar from the flowers as a source of food, while others use it as a garnish.

Bush bananas are cooked in hot earth beside the fire or eaten raw when young (the flavour has been likened to fresh peas or zucchini). The root of the plant is called Merne atnetye and can also be eaten raw or cooked. The very white roots are cooked in the hot earth close to the fire. Young leaves can be used in salads.

One of the significant bush food for the Aboriginal people of Australia, the food is often depicted in current Aboriginal art, especially paintings about 'bush tucker', as well as 'Bush Banana Dreaming' paintings.

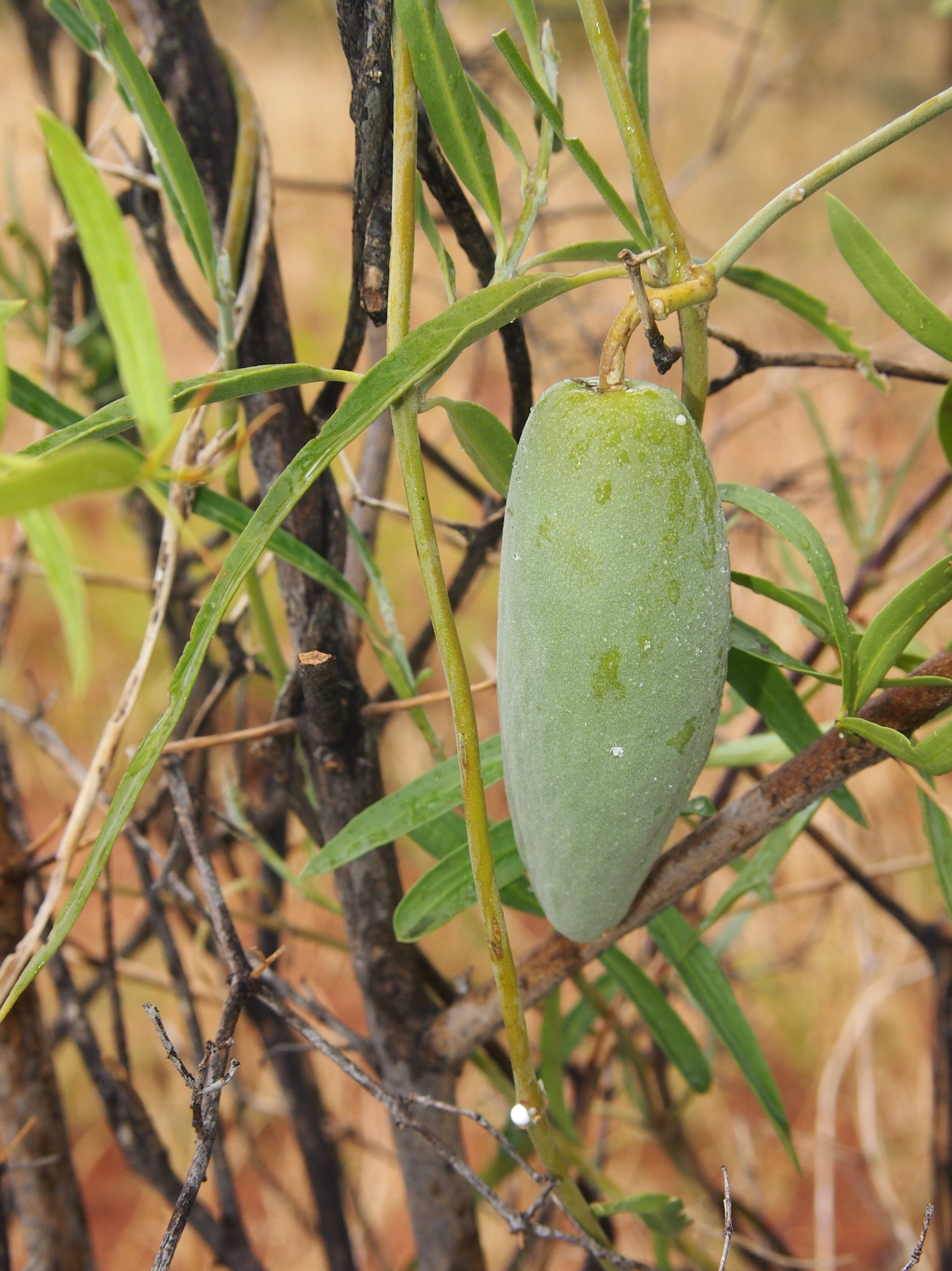
Fruit
