= Leichhardtia mackeeorum =

Conservation status
- Vulnerable (IUCN 3.1)

Scientific classification
- Kingdom: Plantae
- Clade: Tracheophytes
- Clade: Angiosperms
- Clade: Eudicots
- Clade: Asterids
- Order: Gentianales
- Family: Apocynaceae
- Subfamily: Asclepiadoideae
- Genus: Leichhardtia
- Species: L. mackeeorum

Binomial name
- Leichhardtia mackeeorum (Meve, Gâteblé & Liede) Liede, Gâteblé & Meve

Synonyms
- Marsdenia mackeeorum Meve, Gâteblé & Liede

Species of vine found in New Caledonia

Leichhardtia mackeeorum, synonym Marsdenia mackeeorum, is a species of vine in the family Apocynaceae. It is endemic to New Caledonia.

== Description ==
Leichhardtia mackeeorum is a slender twining vine growing to 3 m. It has white latex. The smooth leaves are differently coloured on their upper and lower surfaces (discolorous), on petioles (stems) which are 5–10 mm (0.20–0.39 in) long. They are linear to elliptic and 5–13 cm (2.0–5.1 in) long by 0.7–0.9 cm (0.28–0.35 in) wide, rounded at the base and pointed at the tip, and have revolute margins.

Vegetatively, this species differs little from Marsdenia microstoma, but is distinguished from it by its bostrychoid inflorescence on a rachis which continues to grow and flower, whereas M. microstoma has a different inflorescence type and all the flowers on it open at the same time.

== Taxonomy ==
The species was first described in 2017 as Marsdenia mackeeorum. The specific epithet, mackeeorum (from Latin 'of the MacKees'), honours Hugh Shaw MacKee and his wife, Margaret. Hugh MacKee collected the type specimen in Grande-Terre, South Province, Yaté, Gouemba, New Caledonia at an altitude of 500 m (1,600 ft), on March 22, 1981 (holotype P00607333, isotype P00607334). In 2020, the same authors transferred the species to the genus Leichhardtia.

== Conservation status ==
Some of the localities in which it is found are under threat of mining, and bushfires are a threat to the populations in the maquis vegetation, With an extent of occurrence (EOO) of 1,950 km^{2} (750 sq mi), and an area of occupancy (AOO) of 32 km^{2} (12 sq mi), it satisfies the criteria for it to be declared vulnerable under the IUCN criteria of 2012.
