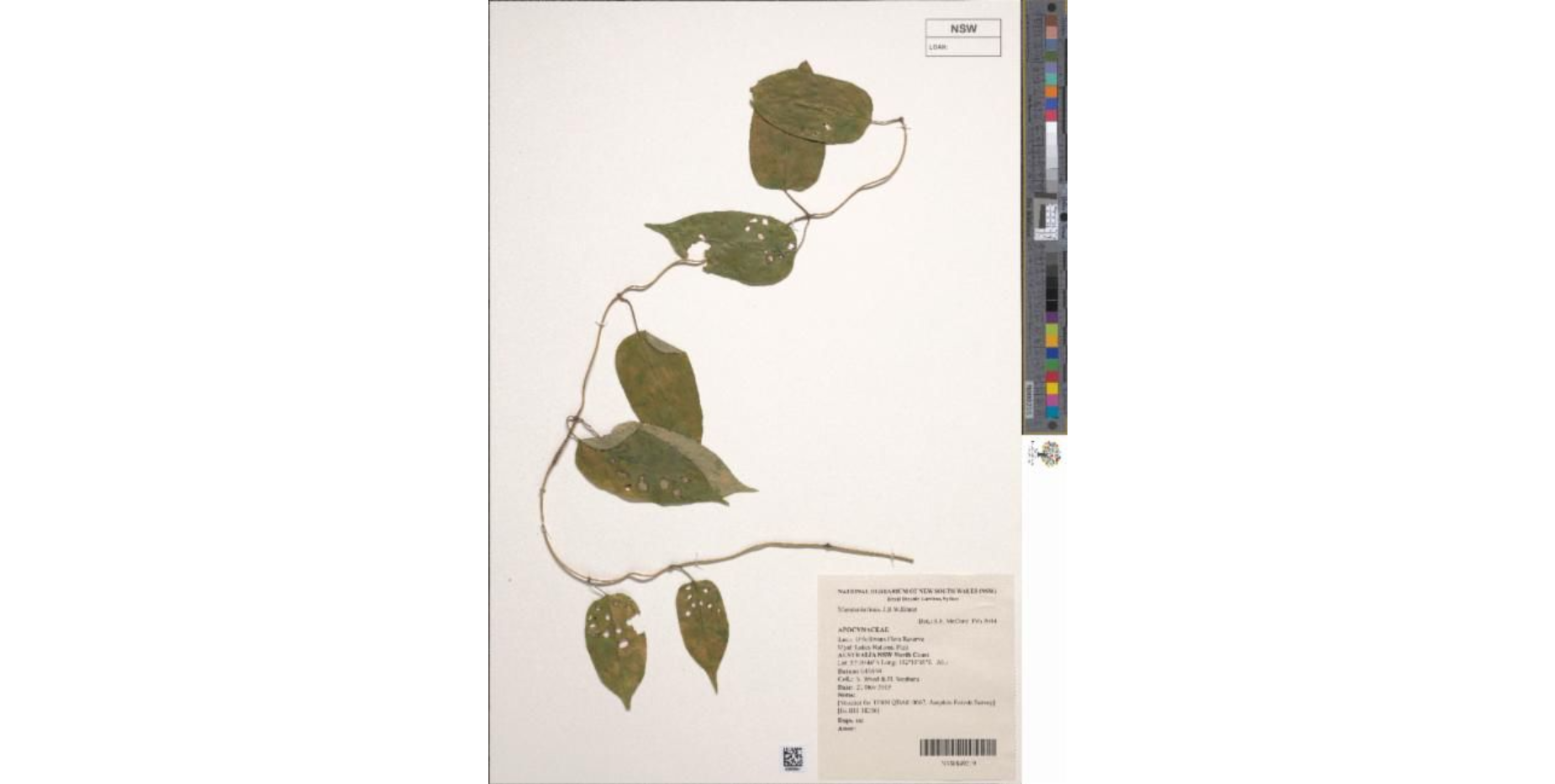
- Marsdenia liisae NSW849219

Scientific classification
- Kingdom: Plantae
- Clade: Tracheophytes
- Clade: Angiosperms
- Clade: Eudicots
- Clade: Asterids
- Order: Gentianales
- Family: Apocynaceae
- Genus: Leichhardtia
- Species: L. liisae

Binomial name
- Leichhardtia liisae (J.B.Williams) P.I.Forst.

= Leichhardtia liisae =

Species of flowering plant

Leichhardtia liisae (common name large-flowered milk vine) is a climbing plant in the Apocynaceae family, endemic to north-eastern New South Wales.

It was first described in 1989 by John Beaumont Williams as Marsdenia liisae. In 2021, in a major revision of the Marsdenia genus, Paul Forster placed the species in Leichhardtia, giving the accepted species name, Leichhardtia liisae.
