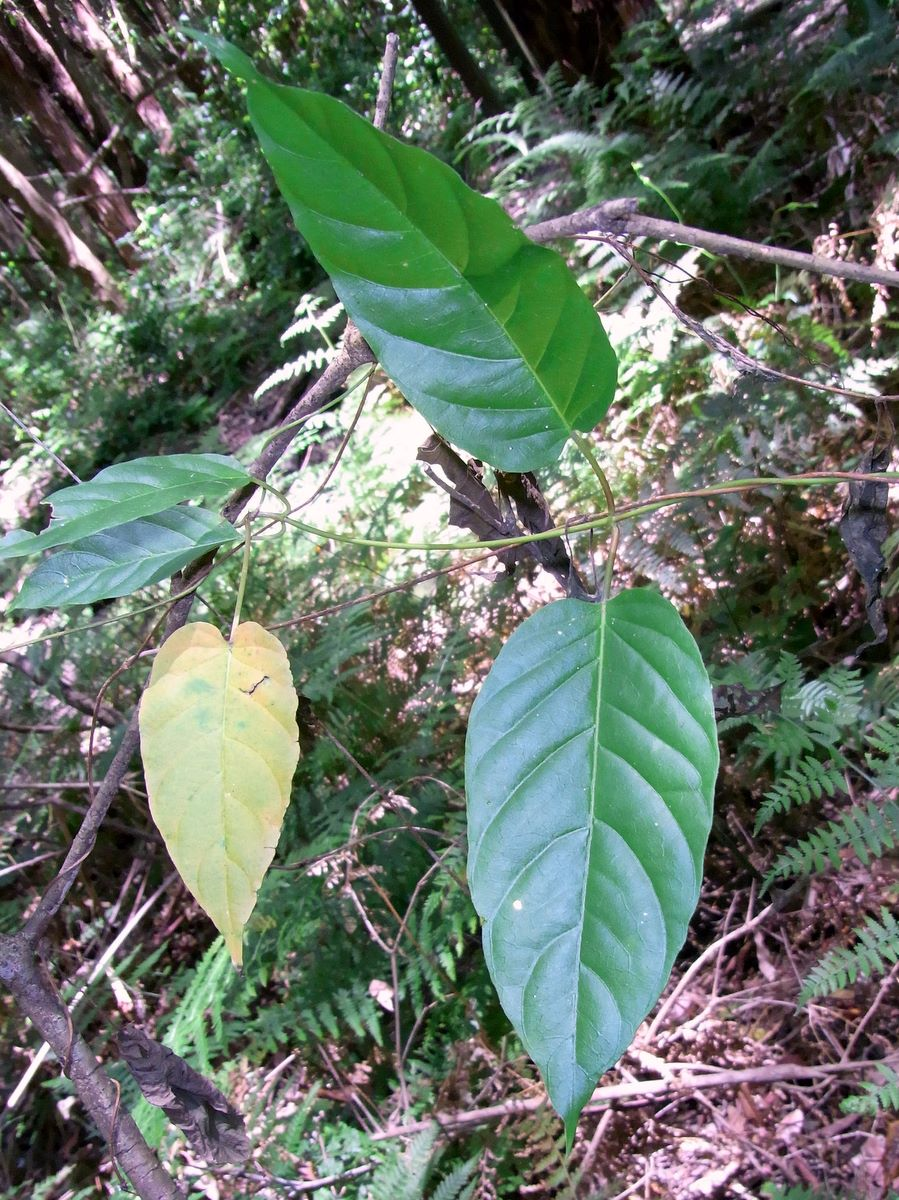
- Lane Cove, Australia

Scientific classification
- Kingdom: Plantae
- Clade: Tracheophytes
- Clade: Angiosperms
- Clade: Eudicots
- Clade: Asterids
- Order: Gentianales
- Family: Apocynaceae
- Genus: Leichhardtia
- Species: L. rostrata

Binomial name
- Leichhardtia rostrata (R.Br.) P.I.Forst.

Synonyms
- Marsdenia rostrata R.Br.; Pergularia rostrata (R.Br.) Spreng.

= Leichhardtia rostrata =

Species of plant

Leichhardtia rostrata, commonly known as milk vine or common milk vine, is a species of plant in the frangipani family Apocynaceae, endemic to eastern Australia. It was formerly known as Marsdenia rostrata.

== Description ==
Leichhardtia rostrata is a woody vine with stem diameters up to 6 cm (2.4 in). It may grow to ten metres in length, leaves are opposite and attached by petioles up to 20 mm (0.79 in) long; leaf blades are rounded, up to 13 cm (5.1 in) long and 7 cm (2.8 in) wide. Flowers occur in umbels, the fruit is a long, pointed, dehiscent follicle up to 7 cm (2.8 in) long. Like all other members of its family, the plant produces milky white sap when damaged.

== Taxonomy ==
It was first described in 1810 by Scottish botanist Robert Brown and given the name Marsdenia rostrata. Following a review of Marsdenia by Australian botanist Paul Irwin Forster published in 2021, all Australian members of the genus were transferred to either Leichhardtia or Gymnema.

The specific epithet rostrata is derived from the Latin word rostratus meaning 'beak' or 'snout', a reference to the fruit.

== Distribution and habitat ==
It inhabits rainforest and wet eucalyptus forest on most of the east coast of Australia, from Cape York Peninsula south to eastern Victoria, as well as Lord Howe Island.
