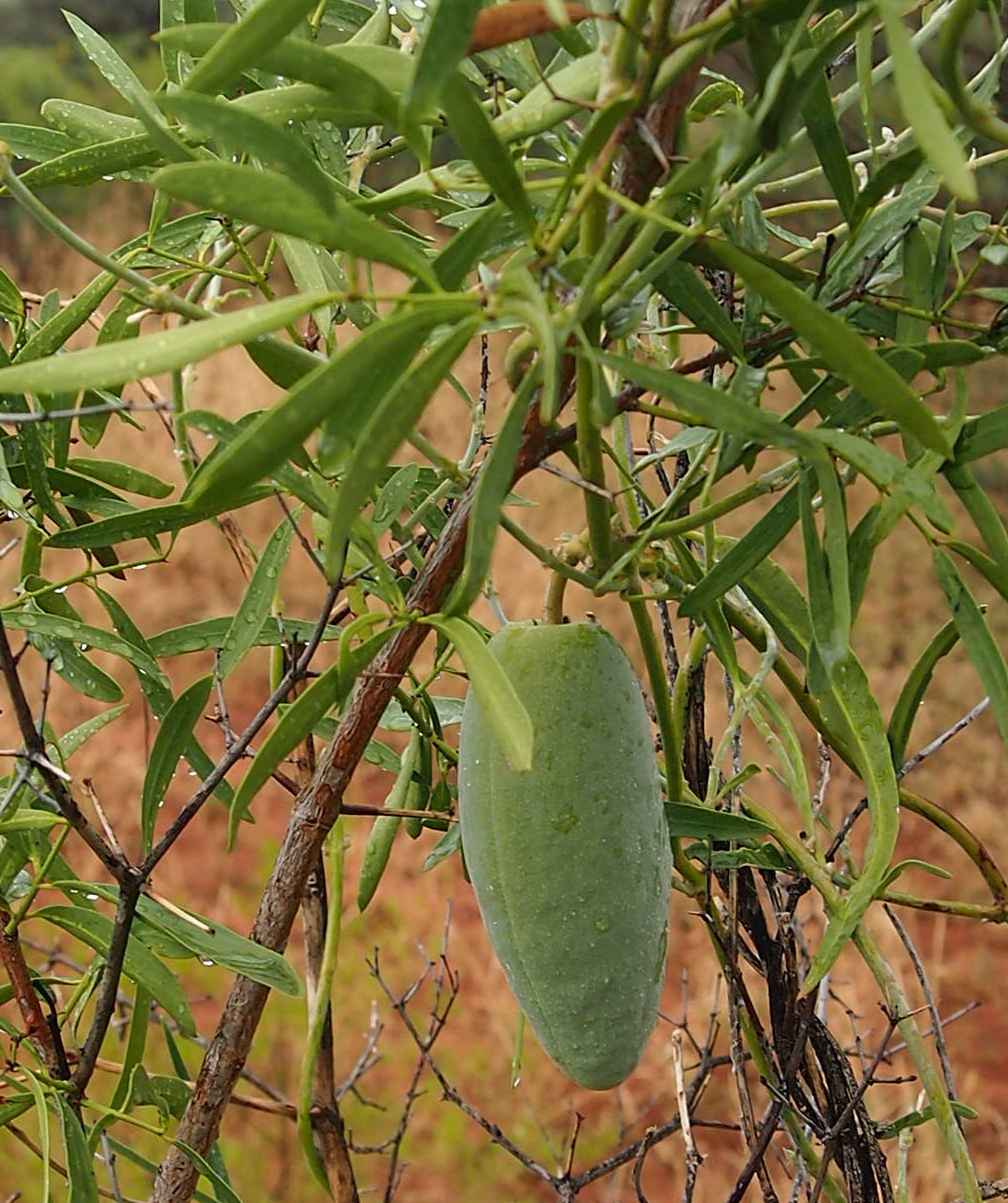
- Leichhardtia australis (fruit)

Scientific classification
- Kingdom: Plantae
- Clade: Tracheophytes
- Clade: Angiosperms
- Clade: Eudicots
- Clade: Asterids
- Order: Gentianales
- Family: Apocynaceae
- Subfamily: Asclepiadoideae
- Tribe: Marsdenieae
- Genus: Leichhardtia; R.Br.

Synonyms
- Thozetia F.Muell. ex Benth.

= Leichhardtia (plant) =

Genus of flowering plants

Leichhardtia is a genus of flowering plants in the dogbane family (Apocynaceae), subfamily Asclepiadoideae, tribe Marsdenieae.. It includes 87 species native to mainland Australia, Papuasia, New Caledonia, and Lord Howe Island.

== Species ==
As of January 2026, Plants of the World Online accepts the following 87 species:

- Leichhardtia ambuntiensis (P.I.Forst.) P.I.Forst. – eastern New Guinea
- Leichhardtia arachnoidea (Schltr.) P.I.Forst. – New Guinea
- Leichhardtia araujacea (F.Muell.) P.I.Forst. – northeastern Queensland
- Leichhardtia archboldiana (P.I.Forst.) P.I.Forst. – eastern New Guinea
- Leichhardtia arfakensis (P.I.Forst.) P.I.Forst. – western New Guinea
- Leichhardtia argillicola (P.I.Forst.) P.I.Forst. – western New Guinea
- Leichhardtia assimulata (S.Moore) Liede, Gâteblé & Meve – central and southern New Caledonia
- Leichhardtia australis R.Br. – central and western Australia
- Leichhardtia belensis (P.I.Forst.) P.I.Forst. – western New Guinea
- Leichhardtia bilobata (P.I.Forst.) P.I.Forst. – eastern New Guinea
- Leichhardtia bliriensis (P.I.Forst.) P.I.Forst. – eastern New Guinea
- Leichhardtia brassii (P.I.Forst.) P.I.Forst. – eastern New Guinea
- Leichhardtia brevifolia (Benth.) P.I.Forst. – eastern Queensland
- Leichhardtia brevis (P.I.Forst.) P.I.Forst. – eastern Queensland
- Leichhardtia brunnea (P.I.Forst.) P.I.Forst. – eastern New Guinea
- Leichhardtia carrii (P.I.Forst.) P.I.Forst. – eastern New Guinea
- Leichhardtia connivens (P.I.Forst.) P.I.Forst. – northern Northern Territory and northern Queensland
- Leichhardtia coronata (Benth.) P.I.Forst. – southeastern Queensland
- Leichhardtia cremea (P.I.Forst.) P.I.Forst. – eastern New Guinea
- Leichhardtia cymulosa (Benth.) P.I.Forst. – northern Queensland
- Leichhardtia destituta (P.I.Forst.) P.I.Forst. – eastern New Guinea
- Leichhardtia dischidioides (P.I.Forst.) P.I.Forst. – western New Guinea
- Leichhardtia divisicola (P.I.Forst.) P.I.Forst. – eastern New Guinea
- Leichhardtia dognyensis (Guillaumin) Liede, Gâteblé & Meve – northern and Central New Caledonia
- Leichhardtia egregia (P.I.Forst.) P.I.Forst. – eastern New Guinea
- Leichhardtia ericoides (Schltr.) Bullock – southeastern New Caledonia
- Leichhardtia flavescens (A.Cunn.) P.I.Forst. – southeastern Queensland to Eastern Victoria
- Leichhardtia flavida (P.I.Forst.) P.I.Forst. – eastern New Guinea
- Leichhardtia fraseri (Benth.) P.I.Forst. – central-eastern and southeastern Queensland and northeastern New South Wales
- Leichhardtia glabrata (Schltr.) P.I.Forst. – New Guinea
- Leichhardtia glandulifera (C.T.White) P.I.Forst. – northern Western Australia, Northern Territory, and northern and eastern Queensland
- Leichhardtia globosa (P.I.Forst.) P.I.Forst. – eastern New Guinea
- Leichhardtia gonoloboides (Schltr.) P.I.Forst. – New Guinea
- Leichhardtia goromotoorum (Gâteblé, Fleurot, Meve & Liede) Gâteblé, Fleurot, Meve & Liede – west-central New Caledonia
- Leichhardtia grandis (P.I.Forst.) P.I.Forst. – eastern New Guinea
- Leichhardtia guillauminiana (P.T.Li) Gâteblé, Meve & Liede – New Caledonia
- Leichhardtia jensenii (P.I.Forst.) P.I.Forst. – northeastern Queensland
- Leichhardtia kaalaensis (Meve, Gâteblé & Liede) Liede, Gâteblé & Meve – northwestern New Caledonia
- Leichhardtia kebarensis (P.I.Forst.) P.I.Forst. – western New Guinea
- Leichhardtia kempteriana (Schltr.) P.I.Forst. – New Guinea
- Leichhardtia koniamboensis (Guillaumin) Liede, Gâteblé & Meve – New Caledonia
- Leichhardtia kuniensis (Meve, Gâteblé & Liede) Liede, Gâteblé & Meve – New Caledonia (Isle of Pines)
- Leichhardtia lacicola (P.I.Forst.) P.I.Forst. – Bismarck Archipelago
- Leichhardtia liisae (J.B.Williams) P.I.Forst. – northeastern New South Wales
- Leichhardtia lloydii (P.I.Forst.) P.I.Forst. – eastern Queensland and eastern New South Wales
- Leichhardtia longiloba (Benth.) P.I.Forst. – southeastern Queensland and northeastern New South Wales
- Leichhardtia lorea (S.Moore) P.I.Forst. – New Guinea
- Leichhardtia lyonsioides (Schltr.) Liede, Gâteblé & Meve – northern and Central New Caledonia
- Leichhardtia mackeeorum (Meve, Gâteblé & Liede) Liede, Gâteblé & Meve – east-central and southeastern New Caledonia
- Leichhardtia micradenia (Benth.) P.I.Forst. – eastern Queensland
- Leichhardtia microlepis (Benth.) P.I.Forst. – northeastern and eastern Queensland
- Leichhardtia millariae (P.I.Forst.) P.I.Forst. – eastern New Guinea
- Leichhardtia mira (P.I.Forst.) P.I.Forst. – western New Guinea
- Leichhardtia neocaledonica (Meve, Gâteblé & Liede) Liede, Gâteblé & Meve – northwestern and west-northwestern New Caledonia
- Leichhardtia neomicrostoma (Meve, Gâteblé & Liede) Liede, Gâteblé & Meve – northern and west-northwestern New Caledonia
- Leichhardtia nigriflora (Guillaumin) Liede, Gâteblé & Meve – east-central and southeastern New Caledonia
- Leichhardtia oubatchensis (Schltr.) Liede, Gâteblé & Meve – northern New Caledonia
- Leichhardtia paludicola (P.I.Forst.) P.I.Forst. – northern Queensland
- Leichhardtia papillosa (P.I.Forst.) P.I.Forst. – eastern New Guinea
- Leichhardtia papuana (P.Royen) P.I.Forst. – eastern New Guinea
- Leichhardtia parva (P.I.Forst.) P.I.Forst. – western New Guinea
- Leichhardtia paulforsteri (Meve, Gâteblé & Liede) Liede, Gâteblé & Meve – southeastern New Caledonia
- Leichhardtia poioensis (P.I.Forst.) P.I.Forst. – eastern New Guinea
- Leichhardtia praestans (Schltr.) P.I.Forst. – New Guinea
- Leichhardtia primulina (P.I.Forst.) P.I.Forst. – eastern New Guinea
- Leichhardtia pumila (P.I.Forst.) P.I.Forst. – central-eastern Queensland
- Leichhardtia quadrata (P.I.Forst.) P.I.Forst. – eastern New Guinea
- Leichhardtia racemosa (F.Muell. ex Benth.) P.I.Forst. – northern Australia to northeastern New South Wales
- Leichhardtia rara (P.I.Forst.) P.I.Forst. – northeastern Queensland (near Cairns)
- Leichhardtia rostrata (R.Br.) P.I.Forst. – eastern Queensland, eastern New South Wales, eastern Victoria, and Lord Howe Island
- Leichhardtia spathulata (P.I.Forst.) P.I.Forst. – Solomon Islands
- Leichhardtia speciosa (Baill.) Liede, Gâteblé & Meve – New Caledonia
- Leichhardtia suaveolens (R.Br.) P.I.Forst. – central-eastern and southeastern New South Wales
- Leichhardtia subglobosa (P.I.Forst.) P.I.Forst. – eastern New Guinea
- Leichhardtia torsiva (P.I.Forst.) P.I.Forst. – eastern New Guinea
- Leichhardtia trilobata (P.I.Forst.) P.I.Forst. – eastern New Guinea
- Leichhardtia tubulosa (F.Muell.) P.I.Forst. – Lord Howe Island (Mt. Gower)
- Leichhardtia tumida (P.I.Forst.) P.I.Forst. – New Guinea
- Leichhardtia tylophoroides (Schltr.) Liede, Gâteblé & Meve – New Caledonia
- Leichhardtia variabilis (P.I.Forst.) P.I.Forst. – eastern New Guinea
- Leichhardtia variifolia (Guillaumin) Liede, Gâteblé & Meve – west-northwestern New Caledonia
- Leichhardtia velutina (R.Br.) P.I.Forst. – northern Australia
- Leichhardtia venusta (P.I.Forst.) P.I.Forst. – eastern New Guinea
- Leichhardtia viridiflora (R.Br.) P.I.Forst. – New Guinea and northern and eastern Australia
- Leichhardtia volcanica (P.I.Forst.) P.I.Forst. – Solomon Islands
- Leichhardtia weari Gâteblé, Meve & Liede – New Caledonia
- Leichhardtia weberlingiana (Liede) Liede, Gâteblé & Meve – north-central New Caledonia (col de Hô)
