= Bulbophyllum maskeliyense =

Scientific classification
- Kingdom: Plantae
- Clade: Tracheophytes
- Clade: Angiosperms
- Clade: Monocots
- Order: Asparagales
- Family: Orchidaceae
- Subfamily: Epidendroideae
- Genus: Bulbophyllum
- Species: B. maskeliyense

Binomial name
- Bulbophyllum maskeliyense Livera

Species of orchid

Bulbophyllum maskeliyense is a species of orchid in the genus Bulbophyllum. Found in Sri Lanka and Southwest India, it is named after Maskeliya, a town in Sri Lanka.
