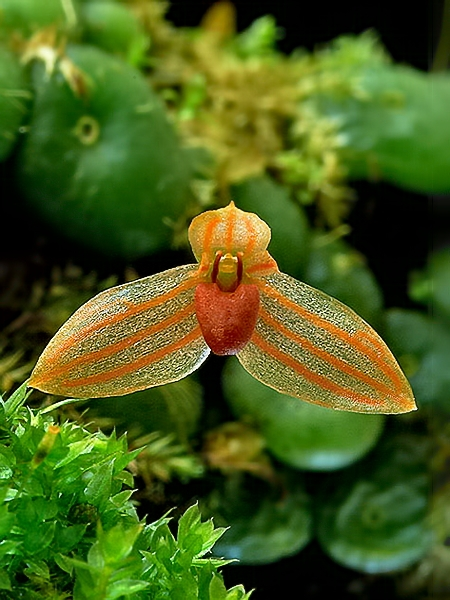

Scientific classification
- Kingdom: Plantae
- Clade: Tracheophytes
- Clade: Angiosperms
- Clade: Monocots
- Order: Asparagales
- Family: Orchidaceae
- Subfamily: Epidendroideae
- Genus: Bulbophyllum
- Species: B. moniliforme

Binomial name
- Bulbophyllum moniliforme C. S. P. Parish & Rchb. f.

Synonyms
- Phyllorkis moniliformis (C.S.P.Parish & Rchb.f.) Kuntze; Trias pusilla J.Joseph & H.Deka; Bulbophyllum subtenellum Seidenf.; Jejosephia pusilla (J.Joseph & H.Deka) A.N.Rao & Mani; Bulbophyllum jejosephii J.J.Verm., Schuit. & de Vogel; Bulbophyllum paramjitii Agrawala, Sharief & B.K.Singh

= Bulbophyllum moniliforme =

Species of orchid

Bulbophyllum moniliforme is a species of orchid in the genus Bulbophyllum. It is indigenous to the Assam region in Northeast India.
