= Bulbophyllum keekee =

Conservation status
- Least Concern (IUCN 3.1)

Scientific classification
- Kingdom: Plantae
- Clade: Tracheophytes
- Clade: Angiosperms
- Clade: Monocots
- Order: Asparagales
- Family: Orchidaceae
- Subfamily: Epidendroideae
- Genus: Bulbophyllum
- Species: B. keekee

Binomial name
- Bulbophyllum keekee N.Hallé

Species of orchid

Bulbophyllum keekee is a species of orchid in the genus Bulbophyllum, native to New Caledonia. It is protected in the northern province.

The species epithet, keekee, honours Hugh Shaw MacKee, a botanist who collected for over 30 years in New Caledonia.

== Description ==
This is a tiny plant and when flowering is no greater than 1 cm high. The rounded pseudobulbs are spaced on the rhizome. Despite its tiny size, this plant can cover large areas.

== Habitat ==
The plant lives at elevation, often on Araucarias.
