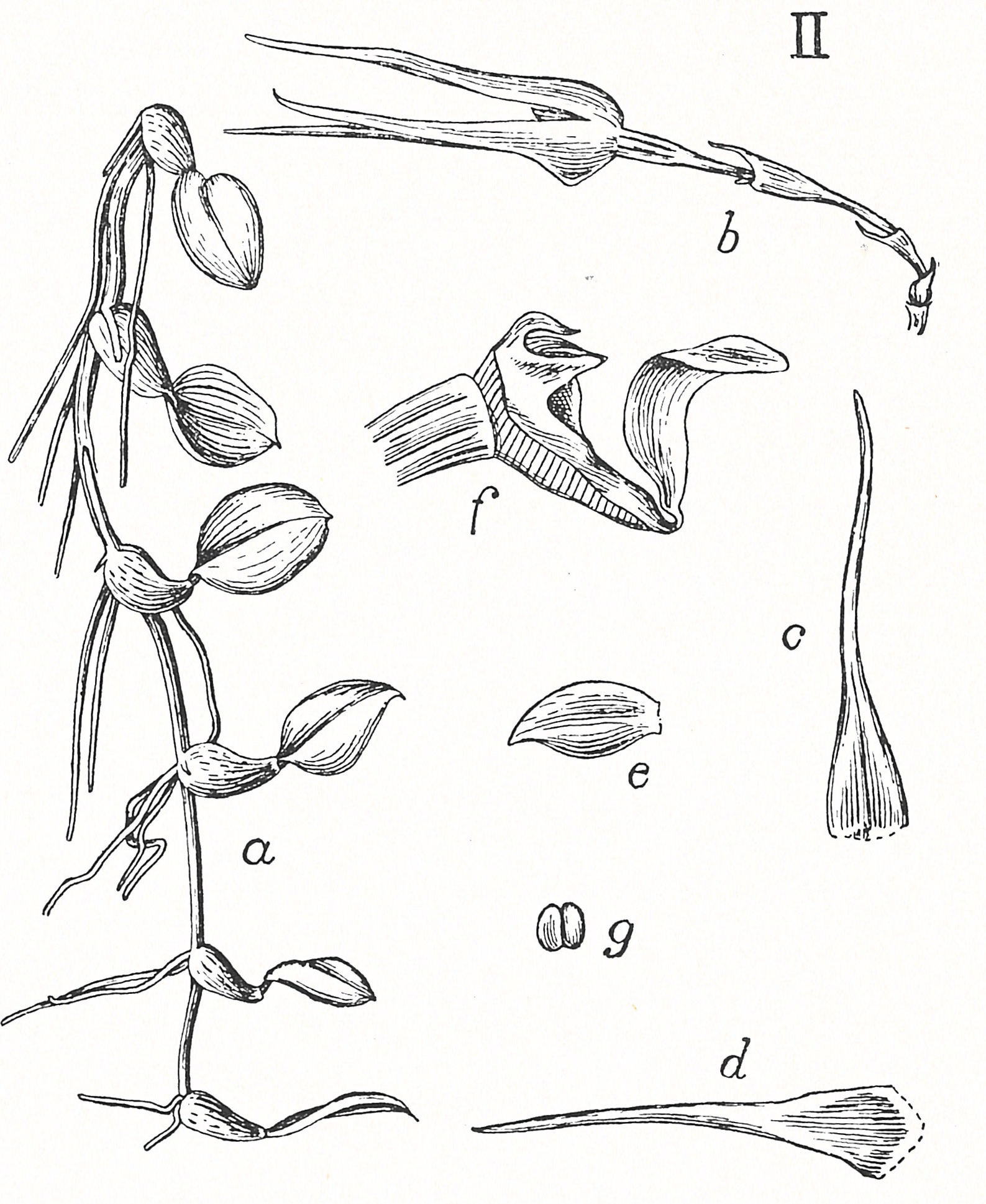

Scientific classification
- Kingdom: Plantae
- Clade: Tracheophytes
- Clade: Angiosperms
- Clade: Monocots
- Order: Asparagales
- Family: Orchidaceae
- Subfamily: Epidendroideae
- Genus: Bulbophyllum
- Species: B. mucronatum

Binomial name
- Bulbophyllum mucronatum (Blume) Lindl.

= Bulbophyllum mucronatum =

Species of orchid

Bulbophyllum mucronatum is a species of orchid in the genus Bulbophyllum. It is found in Bhutan, Thailand, western Java, Borneo, Sulawesi and the Philippines. It is found at elevations of 400 to 1200 meters above sea level.
