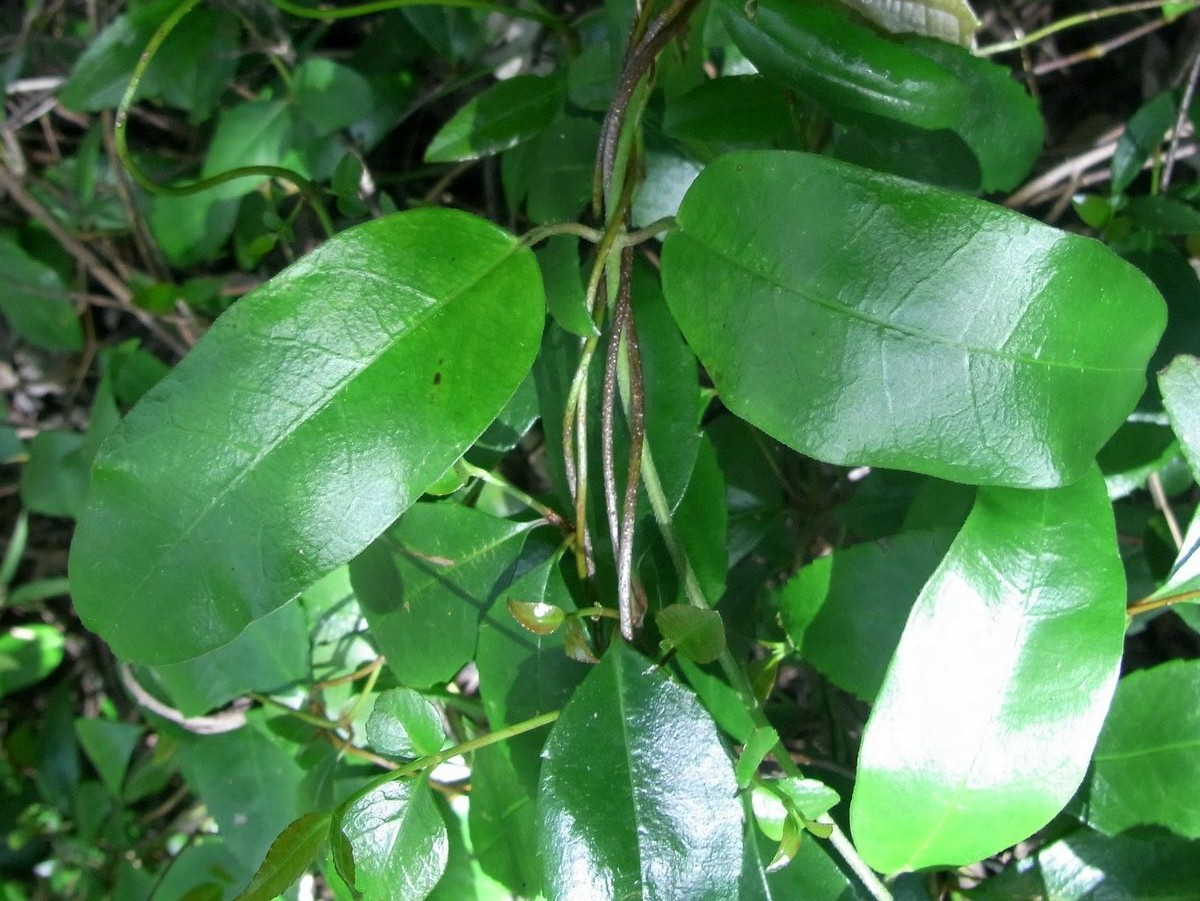
- Eastwood, Australia
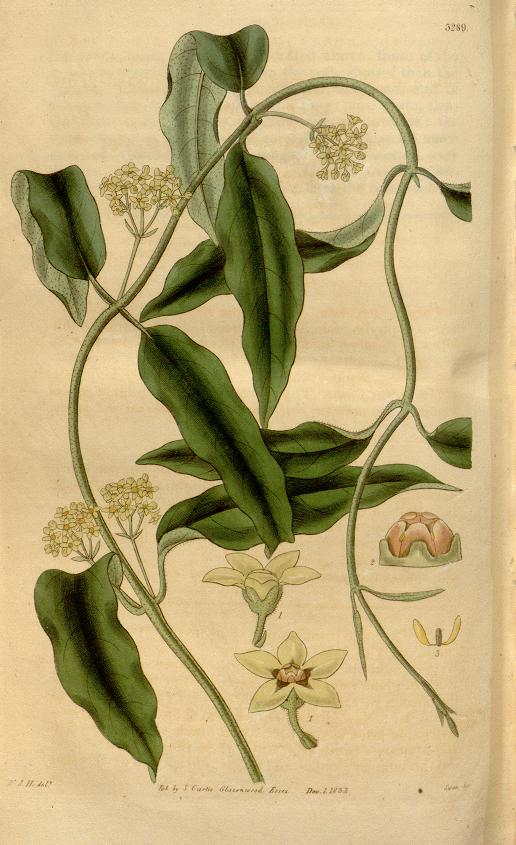
- Marsdenia flavescens from Curtis' botanical magazine t.3289.

Scientific classification
- Kingdom: Plantae
- Clade: Tracheophytes
- Clade: Angiosperms
- Clade: Eudicots
- Clade: Asterids
- Order: Gentianales
- Family: Apocynaceae
- Genus: Leichhardtia
- Species: L. flavescens

Binomial name
- Leichhardtia flavescens (A.Cunn.) P.I.Forst.

Synonyms
- Marsdenia flavescens A.Cunn.; Pergularia flavescens (A.Cunn.) D.Dietr.

= Leichhardtia flavescens =

Yellow milk vine

Species of plant

Leichhardtia flavescens, synonym Marsdenia flavescens, is a vine found in eastern Australia (New South Wales, Queensland and Victoria). Common names include hairy milk vine, yellow milk vine and native potato.

The type specimen and seed was collected in the Illawarra district and described (in 1833) by the explorer Allan Cunningham as Marsdenia flavescens. According to the text by William Jackson Hooker, these plants were grown at Kew Gardens in London. "Mr. ALLAN CUNNINGHAM, who found it in New Holland, on the sea-shore at the Illawana district, in lat. 341/2°, whence living plants were imported to His Majesty's Gardens at Kew." sic.

In a 2021 revision of Marsdenia, Paul Forster reassigned the species to the genus, Leichhardtia to give the currently accepted name.

The specific epithet flavescens is from Latin, and it refers to the pale yellow flowers.
