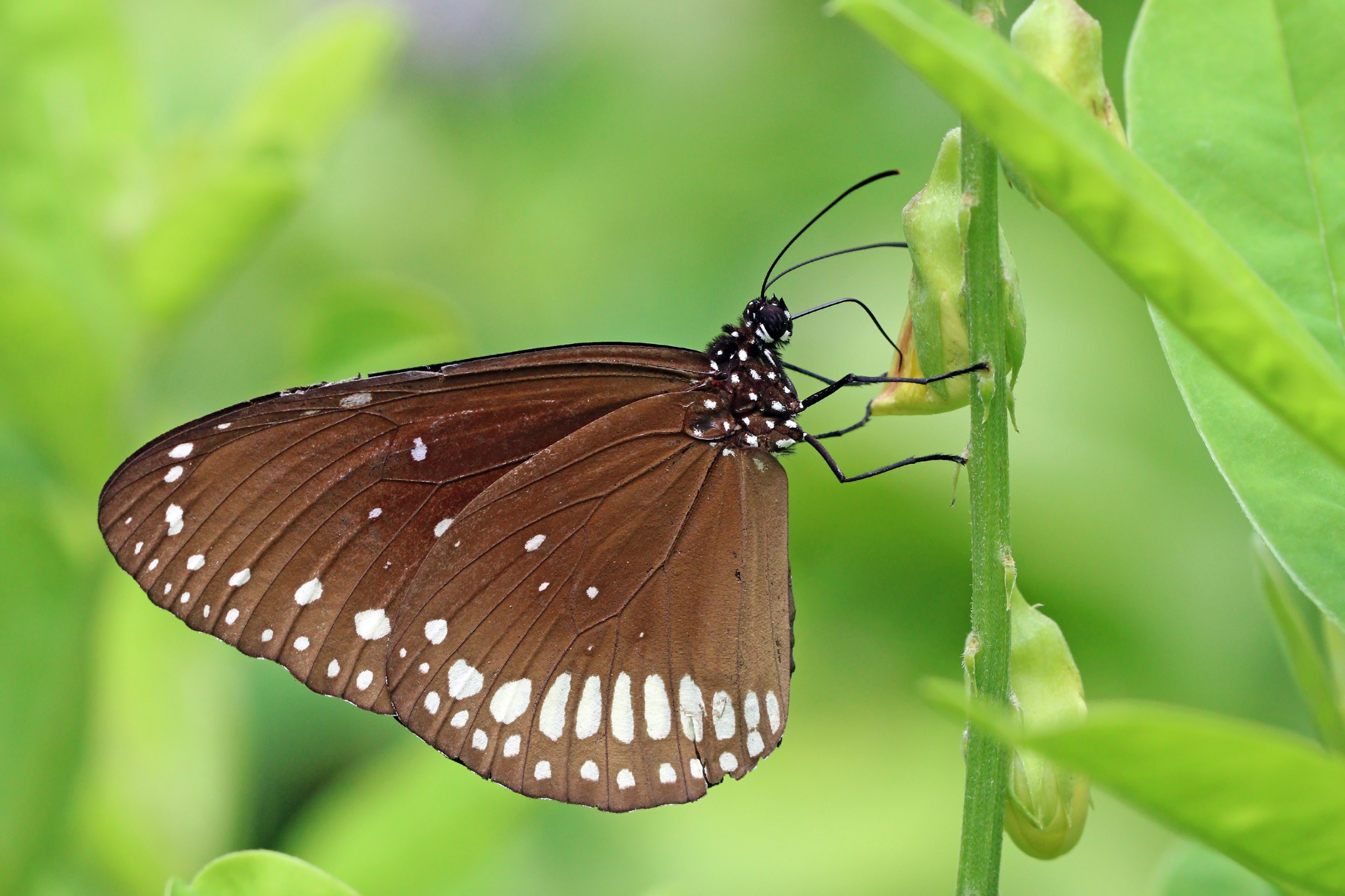
- E. c. core Kumarakom, Kerala

Conservation status
- Least Concern (IUCN 3.1)

Scientific classification
- Kingdom: Animalia
- Phylum: Arthropoda
- Clade: Pancrustacea
- Class: Insecta
- Order: Lepidoptera
- Family: Nymphalidae
- Genus: Euploea
- Species: E. core

Binomial name
- Euploea core (Cramer, 1780)
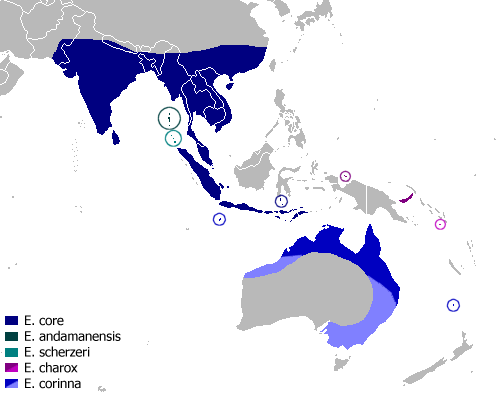

= Euploea core =

Common crow

Species of butterfly

Euploea core, also known as the common crow, is a common butterfly found in South Asia to Australia. In India it is also sometimes referred to as the common Indian crow, and in Australia as the Australian crow. It belongs to the crows and tigers subfamily Danainae (tribe Danaini).

E. core is a glossy-black, medium-sized 85–95 mm (3.3–3.7 in) butterfly with rows of white spots on the margins of its wings. E. core is a slow, steady flier. Due to its unpalatability it is usually observed gliding through the air with a minimum of effort. As caterpillars, this species sequesters toxins from its food plant which are passed on from larva to pupa to the adult. While feeding, it is a very bold butterfly, taking a long time at each bunch of flowers. It can also be found mud-puddling with others of its species and often in mixed groups. The males of this species visit plants like Crotalaria and Heliotropium to replenish pheromone stocks which are used to attract a female during courtship.

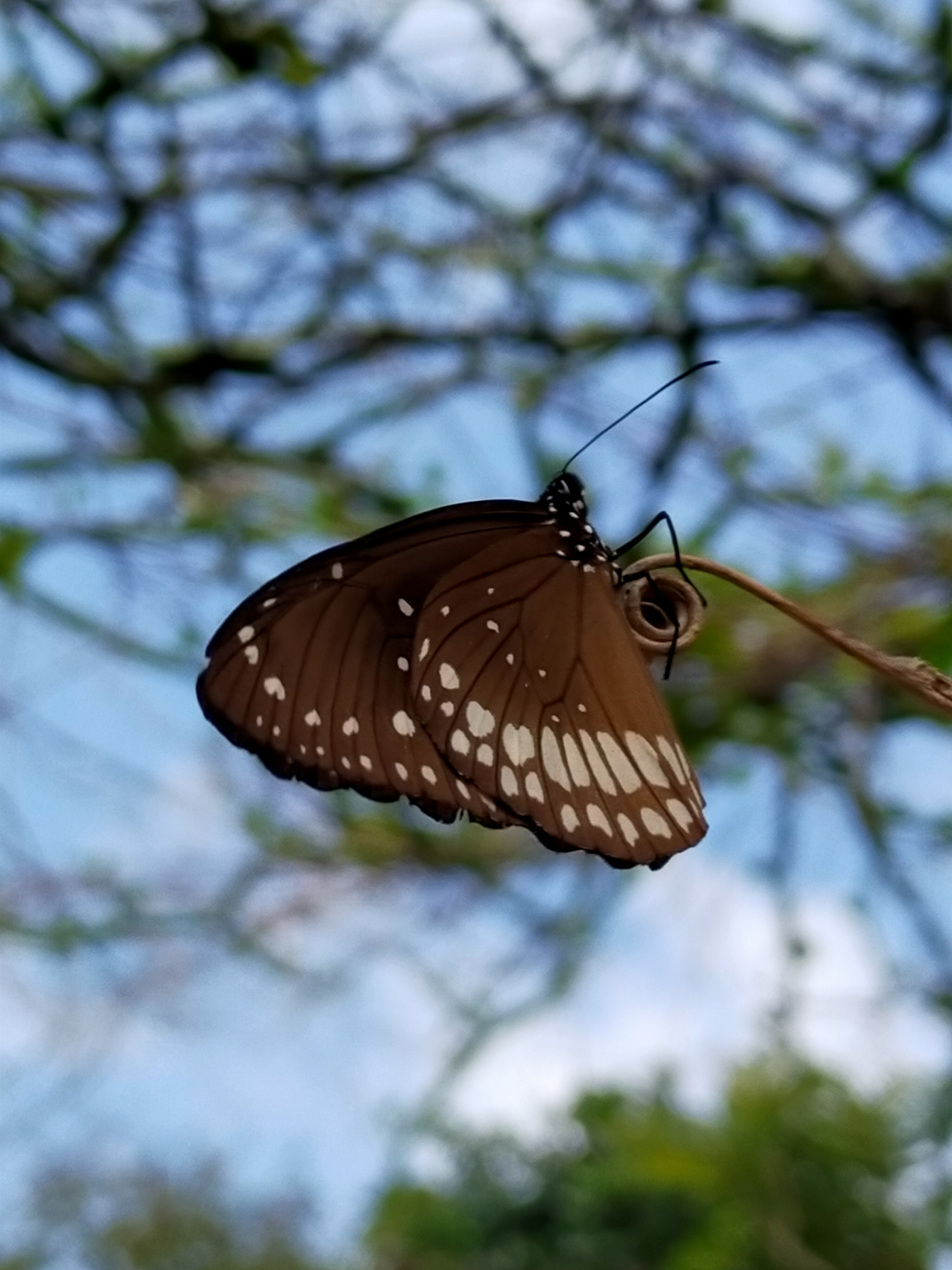
Euploea core at thachangad

The common crow is the most common representative of its genus, Euploea. Like the tigers (genus Danaus), the crows are inedible and thus mimicked by other Indian butterflies (see Batesian mimicry). In addition, the Indian species of the genus Euploea show another kind of mimicry, Müllerian mimicry. Accordingly, this species has been studied in greater detail than other members of its genus in India.

== Description ==
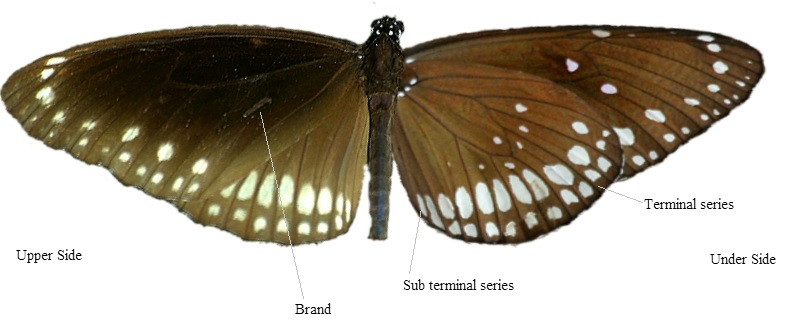
Underside versus upperside

The common crow is a glossy-black butterfly with brown undersides with white markings along the outer margins of both wings. The wingspan is about 8–9 cm and the body has prominent white spots. The male has a velvety black brand located near the rear edge on the upperside of the forewing. On the underside there is a white streak in the same location. This white streak is present in both male and female. In its natural position this streak is hidden behind the hindwing and can be seen only when the butterfly is captured and observed closely.

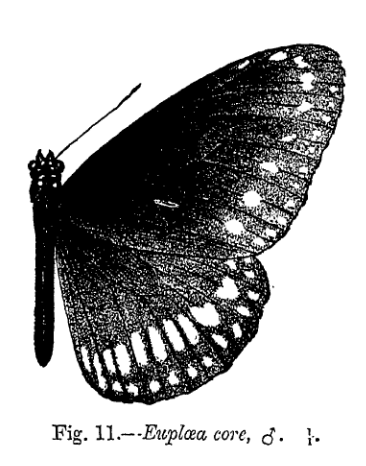
Upperside

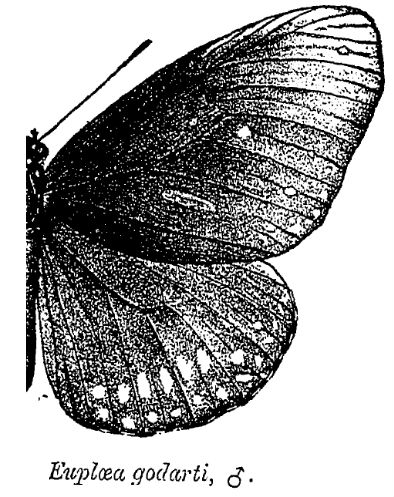
E. godartii (possibly misidentified Indian specimen

Excerpt from Fauna of British India: Butterflies, volume 1:

Upperside dark brown, broadly paler along terminal margins; Fore and hind wing with subterminal and terminal series of white spots; on fore wing the former more or less oval, curved inwards opposite apex, the latter series often incomplete, not reaching apex, the spots smaller; often there is a small costal spot, and very rarely a spot in apex of cell and one or more discal spots; on the hind wing the inner series of spots are elongate, the outer conical.
Underside similar, but ground-colour more uniform; cell, costal and discal spots on both fore and hind wing nearly always present.
Race godarti (=E. godarti) (Northeast India and Myanmar) Fore wing subtriangular, tornus more rounded than in E. core. Hindwing broadly ovate. Upperside dark brown, broadly paler along the terminal margins, especially on the fore wing. Fore wing with more or less incomplete and obsolescent series of subterminal and terminal small white spots, and a powdering of violaceous-white scales at apex, varying very considerably in extent from a mere trace of violaceous between the veins to a large and very conspicuous patch occupying the whole of the apex. Hind wing with a subterminal series of oval or inwardly conical and terminal series of more rounded white spots.
Underside paler brown, the white spots larger, more clearly defined. Fore wing not violaceous at apex, a spot (sometimes absent) in apex of cell, and two or three discal spots. Hindwing: a spot in apex of cell, also sometimes absent, and a discal series of five small spots beyond. Antennae, head, thorax and abdomen very dark brown, and, the antennae excepted, sparsely spotted with white.

— Charles Thomas Bingham, The Fauna of British India, Including Ceylon and Burma. Butterflies Vol. 1

== Subspecies ==
Subspecies of Euploea core are as follows:

- E. c. amymone (Godart, 1819)
- E. c. asela Moore, 1877 Sri Lanka
- E. c. bauermanni Röber, 1885 Saleyer archipelago
- E. c. charox Kirsch, 1877 New Guinea
- E. c. core (Cramer, 1780) – Indian Common Crow. India
- E. c. distanti Moore, 1882
- E. c. godartii Lucas, 1853 – Godart's crow. Myanmar, Thailand, Laos, Cambodia, Vietnam [i.e. Southeast Asia, but type locality is Java]
- E. c. graminifera (Moore, 1883)
- E. c. haworthi Lucas, 1853
- E. c. kalaona Fruhstorfer, 1898
- E. c. prunosa Moore, 1883
- E. c. renellensis Carpenter, 1953
- E. c. vermiculata Butler, 1866 – India, Nepal

For former E. c. andamanensis Atkinson, 1874, see Andaman crow. For former E. c. scherzeri (Felder, 1862), see Nicobar crow.

== Mimicry and similar species ==
Due to its inedibility, Euploea core is mimicked by a few edible species. Additionally a number of other inedible species within the same family mimic each other forming a Mullerian ring.

The edible species are contained in the two families:

- Papilionidae - Malabar raven (Papilio dravidarum), common mime (Papilio clytia) form clytia
- Nymphalidae - great eggfly (Hypolimnas bolina) female, Ceylon palmfly, Elymnias singala male and female

Malabar raven		
Malabar raven (Papilio dravidarum)	Common mime (Papilio clytia) form clytia	Great eggfly (Hypolimnas bolina) female
3 pairs of long legs whereas E. core has 2 pairs of short legs. This can be observed when the butterflies are at rest; The inner (sub terminal) row of white markings on the hindwing are long and pointed towards the body; A prominent white spot in the forewing cell	3 pairs of long legs whereas E. core has 2 pairs of short legs. This can be observed when the butterflies are at rest; The inner (sub terminal) row of white markings on the hindwing are long and pointed towards the body; Terminal row of creamish markings on the hindwing	Larger butterfly; Wing broader and forewing angular. The forewing of E. core has a more rounded margin; Upperside has a bluish sheen.; White markings on the underside hindwing are broader and notched

Distribution also plays a role in telling the species apart. Both Papilionids are forest dwellers and while the common mime is distributed in all forested areas in India, the Malabar raven is endemic to the Western Ghats south of Goa.

The inedible species are in the same genus forming a Mullerian ring

- Brown king crow (E. klugii)
- Double branded crow (E. sylvester)

Both these species differ in the number and size of brand and allied streak in the female, which can only be examined if the specimen is caught and closely examined. The double branded crow has two brands and the female has two white streaks on the underside. The brown king crow has a broad brand and the female has a short indistinct white streak on the underside.

== Range, habitat and habits ==
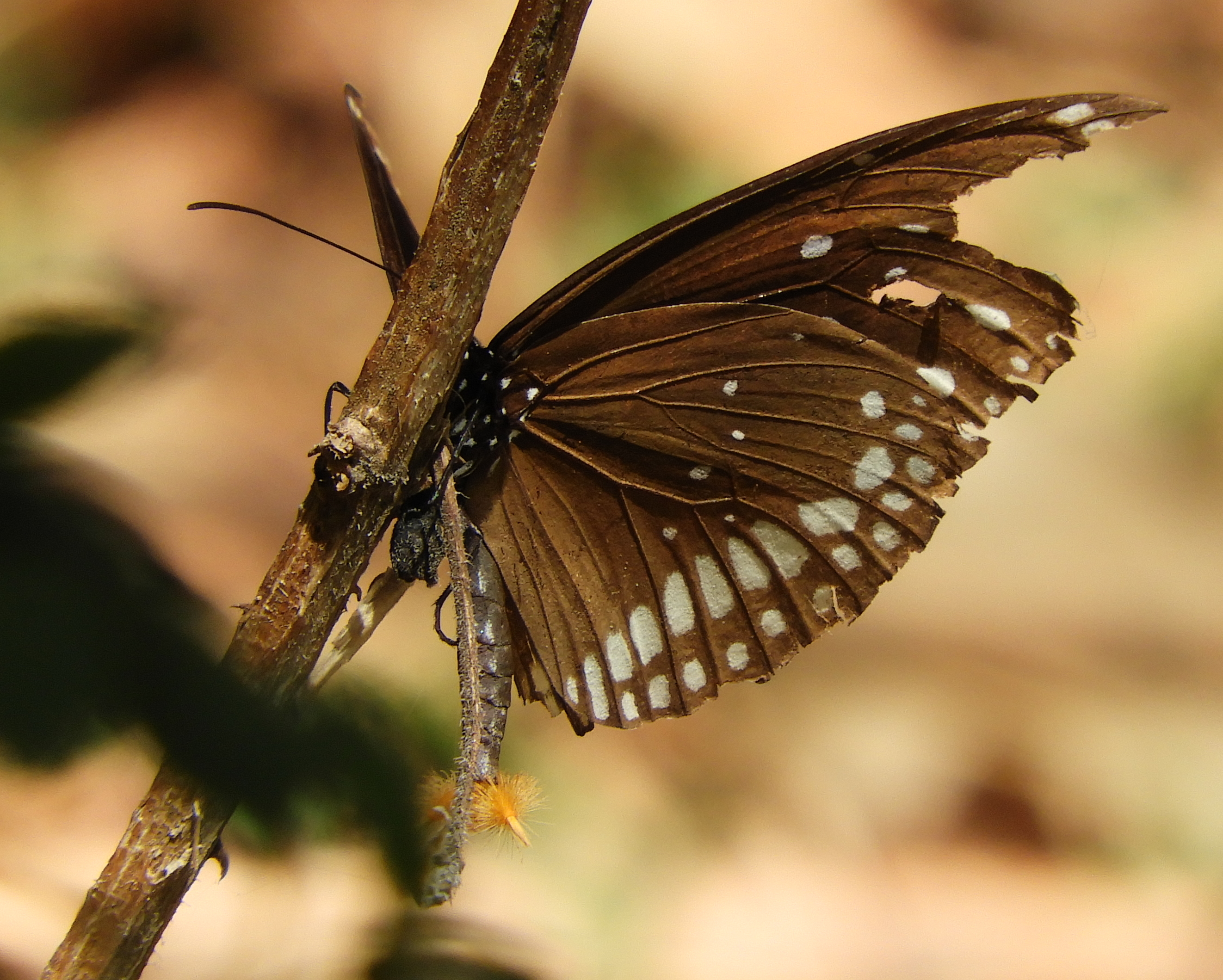
Common crow butterfly male (Euploea core) with hair pencils everted to disperse sex pheromone at Sattal, India.

E. core can be found in southern Pakistan, Sri Lanka, India, Bangladesh, Myanmar, China, and Australia.

In its range E. core is found at all elevations, right from sea level up into the mountains to 2,400 metres (8,000 ft). It can be observed in all layers of vegetation and in all types of regions from arid land to forested areas. It can as commonly be seen gliding over the treetops as flitting about a foot off the ground searching for nectar flowers. In thick forests it is often seen moving along open tracks or following the course of a river.

The butterfly, being protected by its inedibility, has a leisurely flight. It is often seen flying about shrubs and bushes in search of its host plants. It visits a large variety of flowering plant species. When gliding E. core holds its wings at an angle just greater than the horizontal plane, maintaining its flight with a few measured wingbeats.

Video clip

E. core is a nectar lover and visits flowers unhurriedly. It seems to prefer bunches to individual flowers. When feeding the butterfly is unhurried and is not easily disturbed. It can be approached closely at this time.

On hot days large numbers of these butterflies can be seen mud-puddling on wet sand. E. core is an avid mud-puddler often congregating in huge swarms along with other Euploea species as well as other danaids.

This butterfly also gathers on damaged parts of plants such as Crotalaria and Heliotropium to forage for pyrrolizidine alkaloids which are chemicals precursors to produce pheromones. During courtship the males of E. core release these sex pheromones to attract females. Once a female is in the vicinity the males glide around and with the help of a couple of yellow brush like organs extending out from the tip of the abdomen they disperse the scent in the air.

Along with other danaids, such as the tigers, E. core is one of the most common migrating butterfly species. Males and females in equal proportions have been seen to migrate.

== Protection ==
The common crow is distasteful due to chemicals extracted from the latex of the food plants consumed in their caterpillar stage. Thus protected, they fly in a leisurely manner, gliding skilfully with wings held slightly above the horizontal. This indicates its protection due to inedibility to a predator. The inexperienced predator will try attacking it, but will learn soon enough to avoid this butterfly as the alkaloids in its body cause vomiting.

The butterfly has tough, leathery wings. When attacked it shams death and oozes liquid which causes any predators to release them and become nauseous. Once released the butterfly "recovers miraculously" and flies off. Predators experience enough trauma that the characteristics of the butterfly are imprinted in memory.

== Life cycle ==
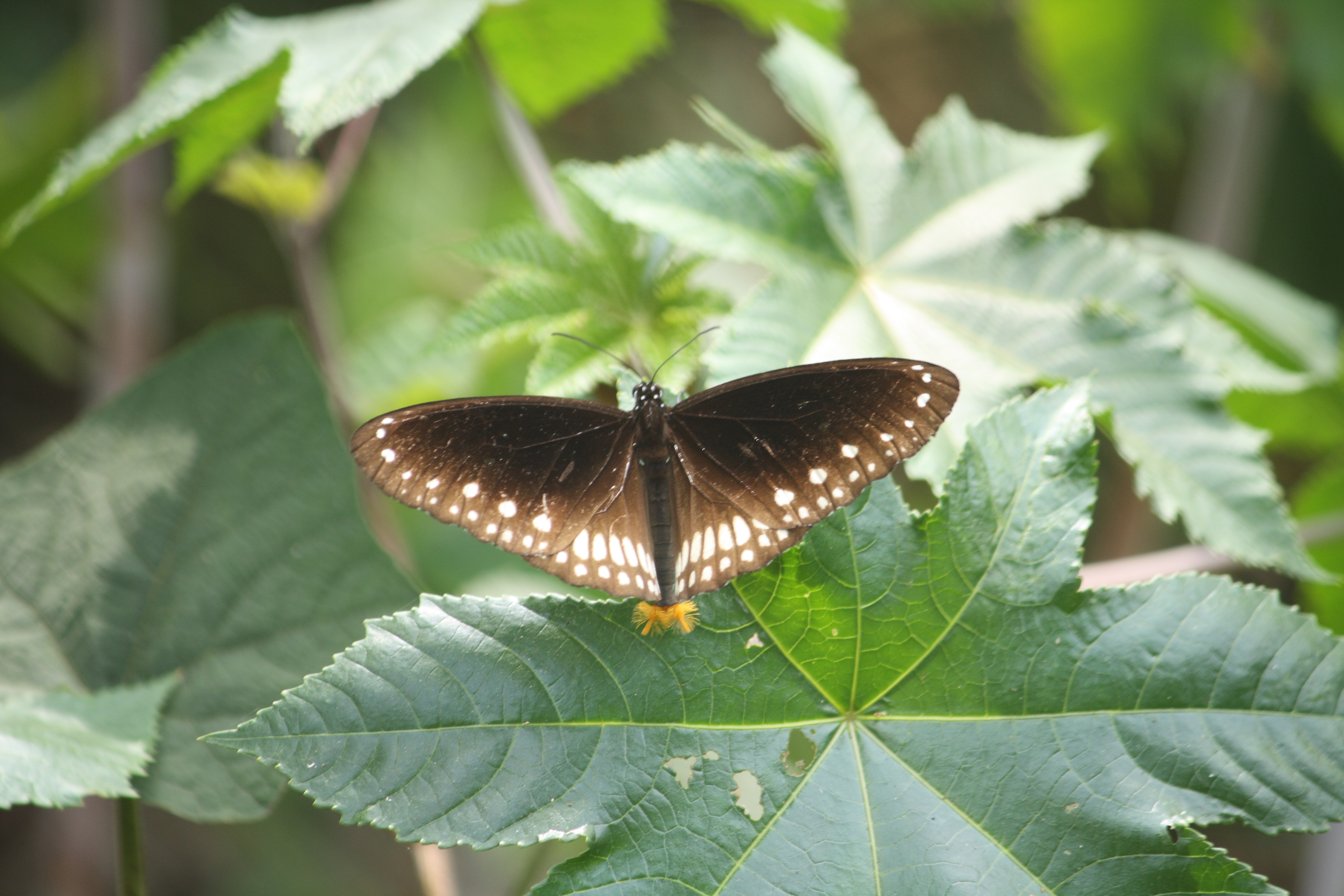
Male dispersing pheromones

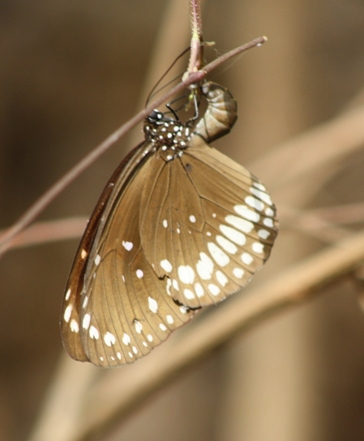
Female laying egg

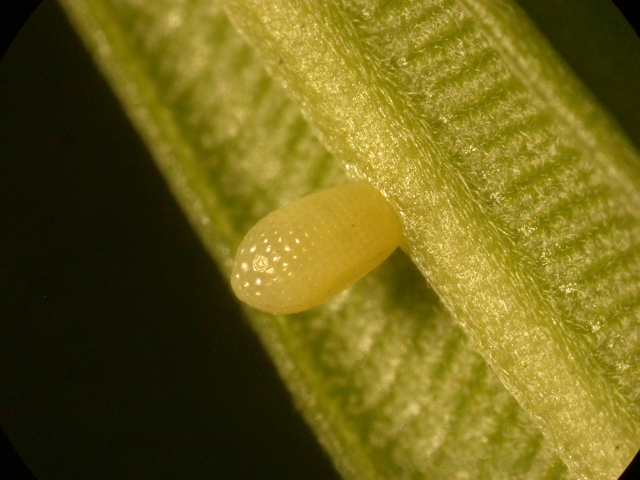
Egg

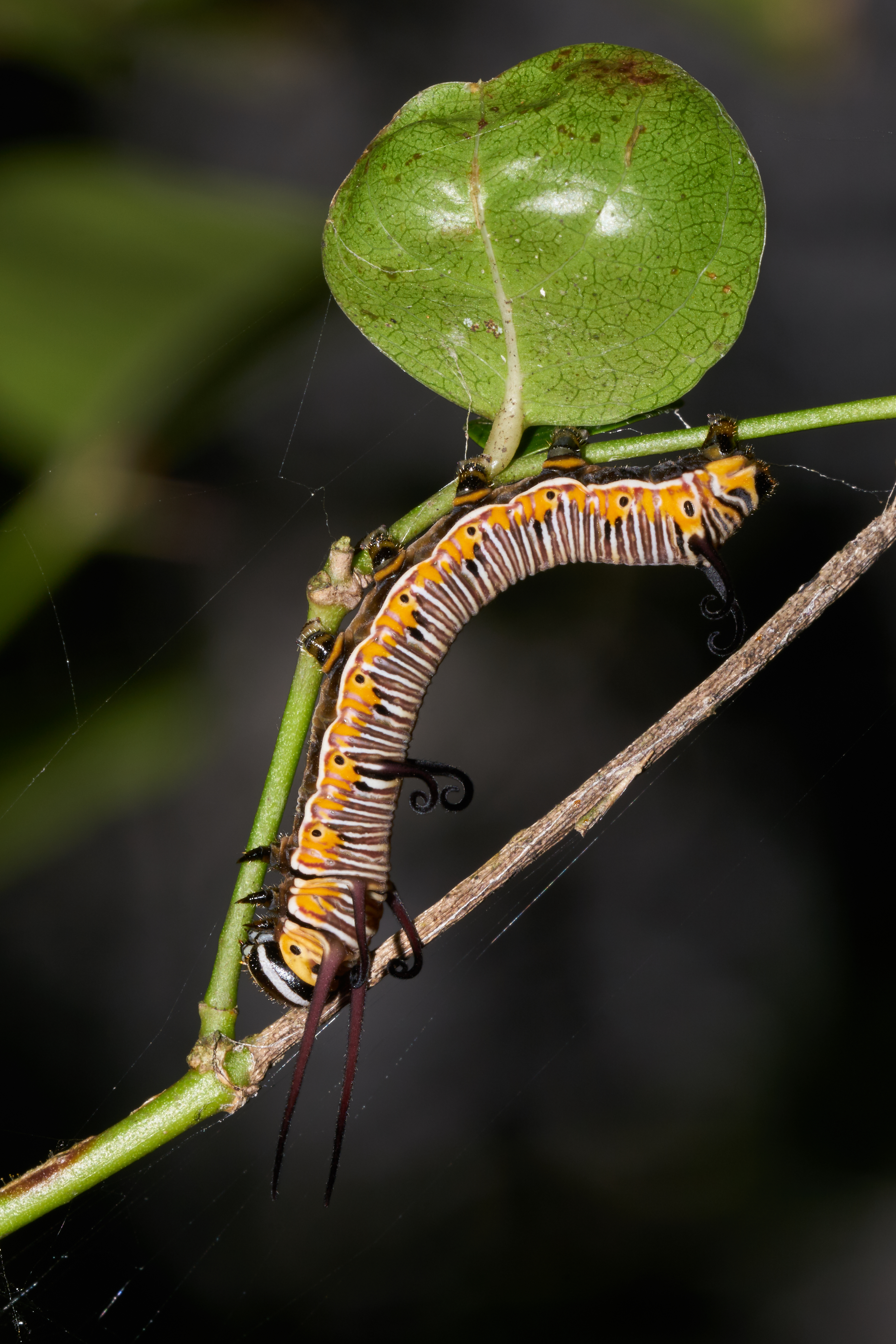
Caterpillar on Carissa carandas, Kerala

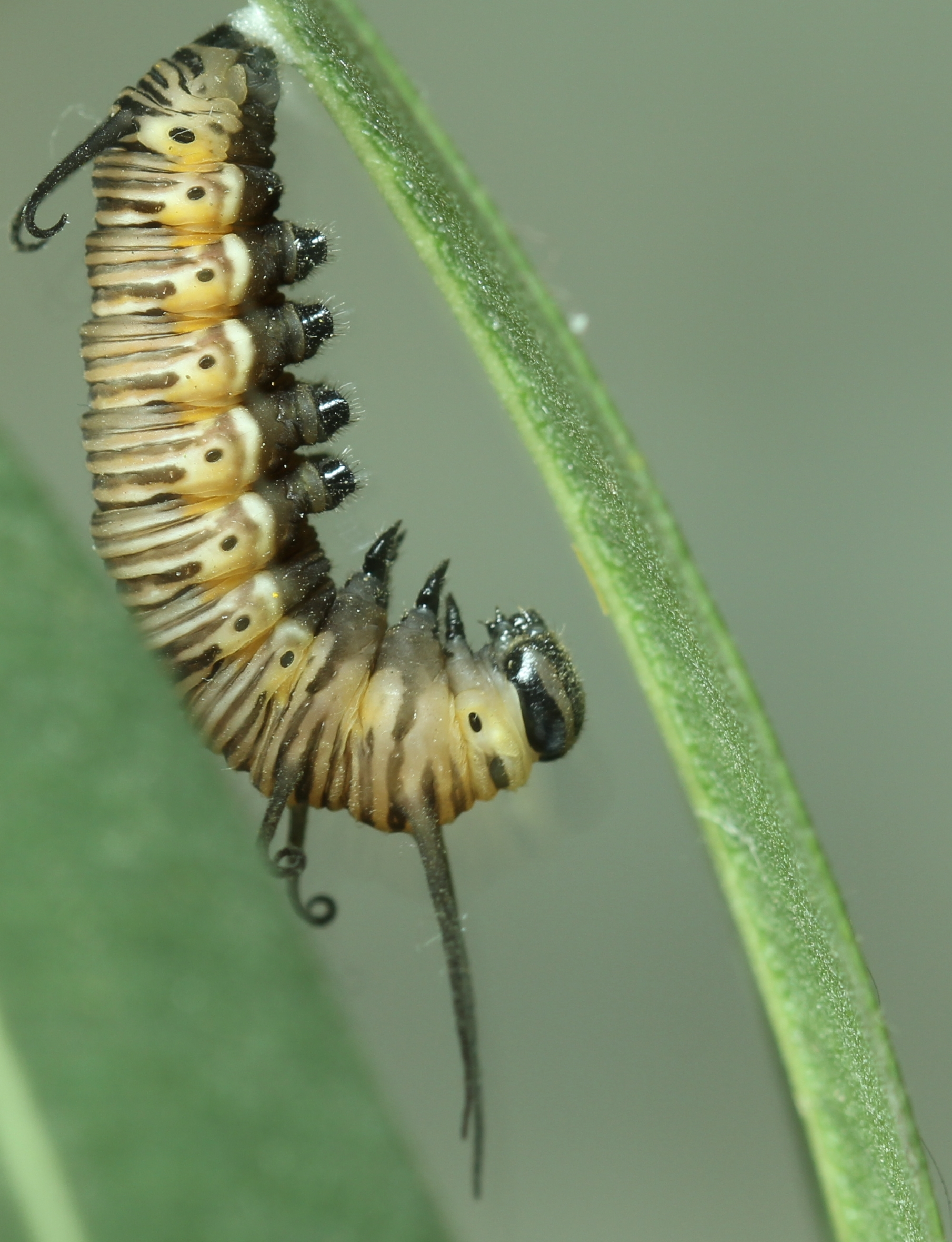
Beginning of pupation

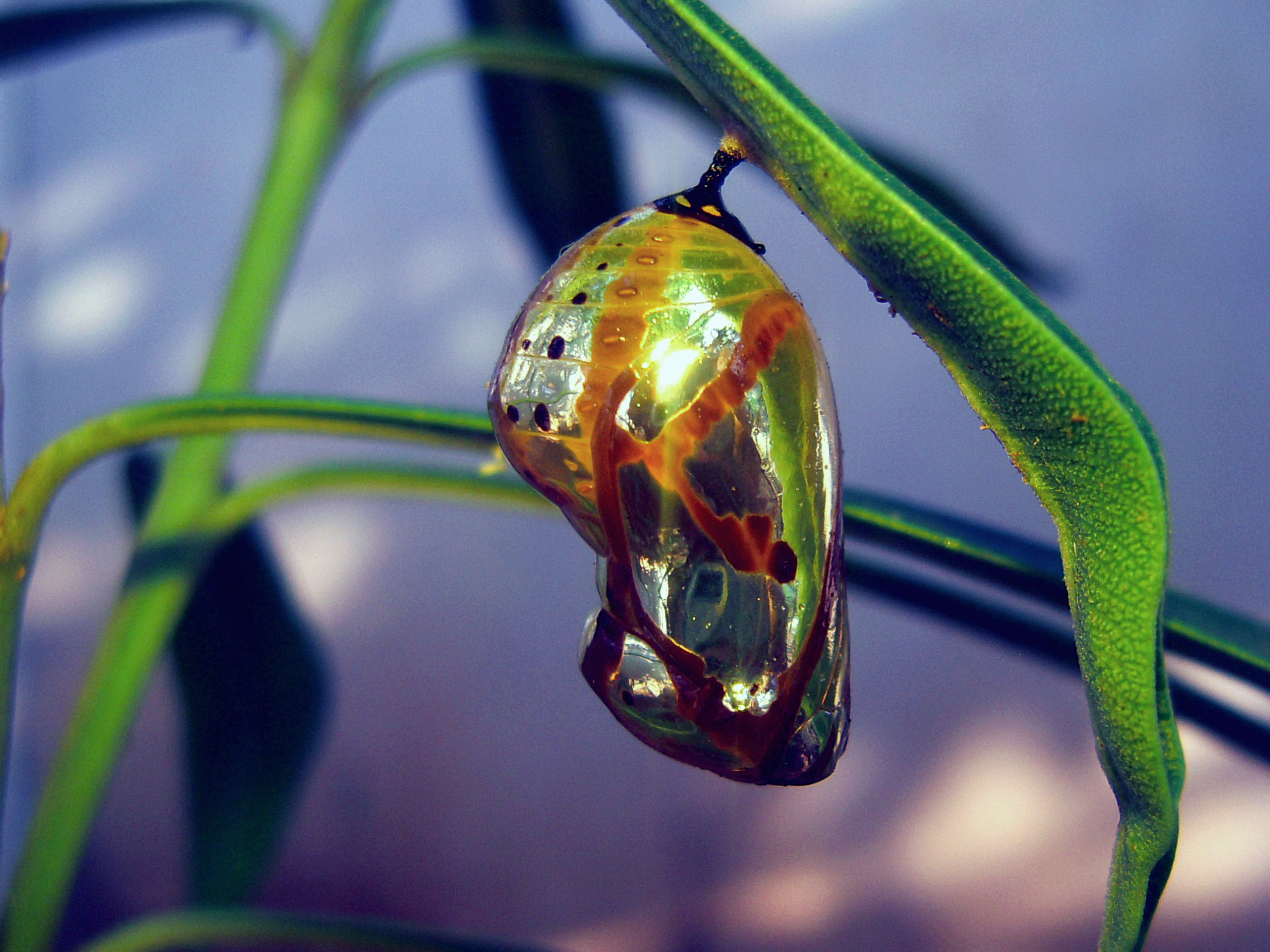
Shiny pupa

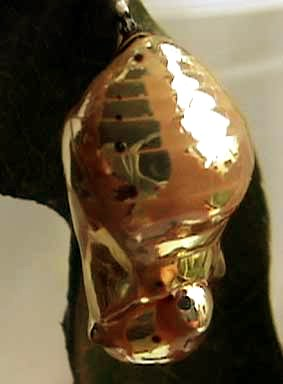
Another shiny pupa

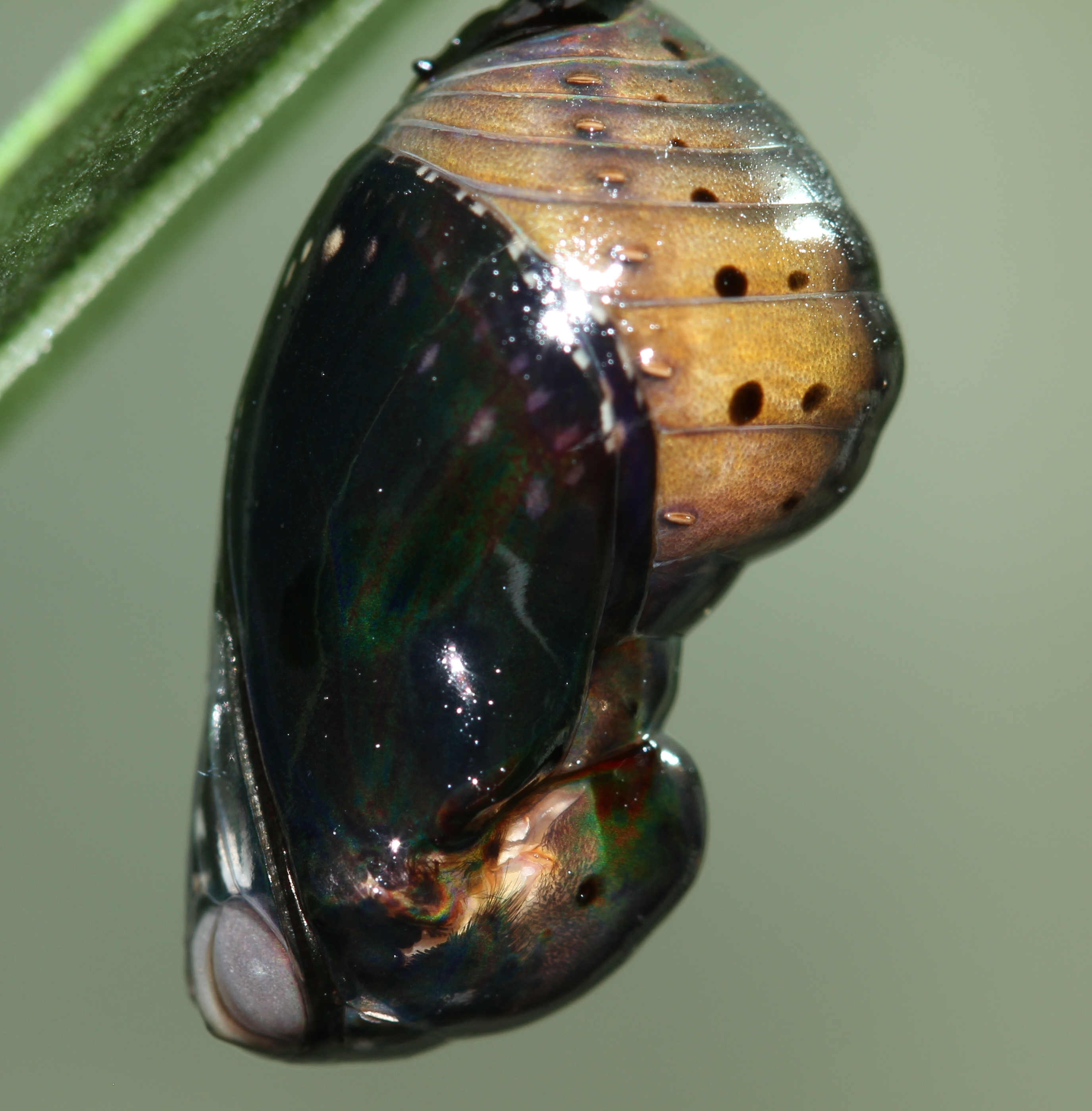
Last stage of the pupa

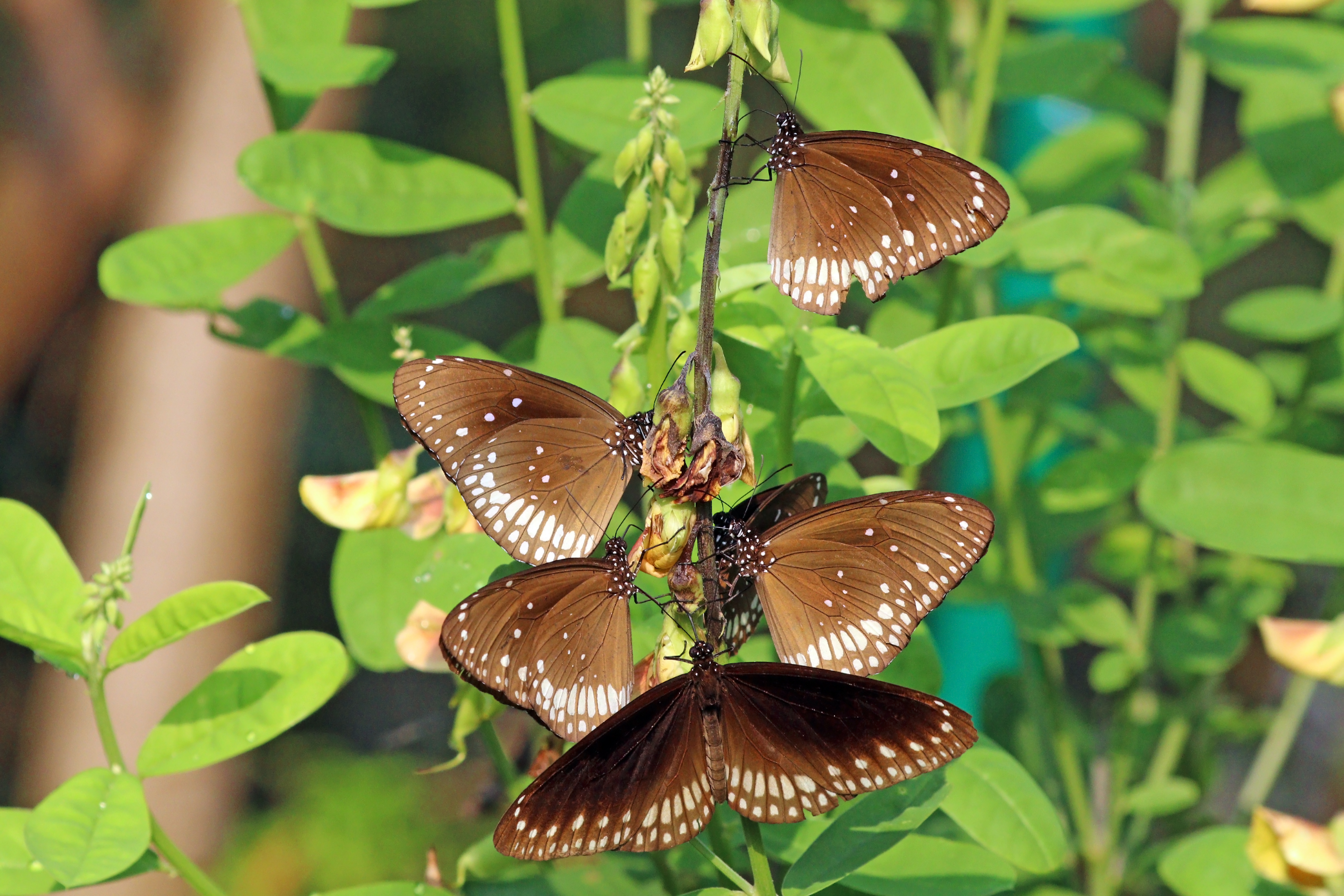
Nectaring

=== Eggs ===
Time lapse video of pupation of common crow butterfly

Eggs are laid on the underside of young leaves of the host plants. The egg is shiny white, tall and pointed, with ribbed sides. Just before hatching the eggs turn greyish with a black top.

=== Caterpillar ===
Throughout its life the caterpillar stays on the underside of the leaves. The caterpillar is uniformly cylindrical, vividly coloured and smooth. It has alternate white and dark brown or black transverse bands. Just above the legs and prolegs, along the entire body is a wide orangish-red band interspersed with black spiracles. The most striking characteristics are the four pairs of long black tentacles. The first pair is movable and is also the longest. The tentacles are present on the 3rd, 4th, 6th, and 12th segments. The head is shiny, smooth and has alternating black and white semicircular bands.

Since the host plants contain poisonous latex, the caterpillar has evolved peculiar eating habits. It first chews the midrib of the leaf, cutting off the leaf's supply of latex and then goes on to nip a few of the secondary veins of the leaf, further blocking the flow of latex. Subsequently, the caterpillar feeds on the leaf but only where the leaf's natural defences have been turned off. The caterpillar is able to tolerate the plant toxins and stores it in its fatty tissue which helps make the adult distasteful to predators.

Video of euploea core caterpillar crawling and photos of it on allamanda leaf

=== Pupa ===
The pupa of this species is shiny golden in colour and compact. The wing margins and margins of the abdominal segments are marked with broad colourless bands. The abdomen has a pair of black spots on each segment. The cremaster is black. Just before emergence the black wings show through the skin of the pupa. The species are attacked by parasitic flies.

== Larval food plants ==
The common crow feeds on a large number of plants of the families

- Apocynaceae (dogbanes, milkweeds and oleanders)
- Moraceae (figs)
- Rubiaceae,
- Ulmaceae (nettles)

and the specific species are -

- Aphananthe cuspidata,
- Asclepias curassavica,
- Asclepias guadeloupe,
- Asclepias syriaca,
- Calotropis gigantea,
- Carissa ovata,
- Cerbera manghas,
- Cryptolepis pauciflora
- Cryptolepis sinensis,
- Cryptostegia madagascariensis,
- Cynanchum carnosum,
- Ficus benghalensis,
- Ficus benjamina,
- Ficus hederacea,
- Ficus microcarpa
- Ficus obliqua,
- Ficus pandurata
- Ficus platypoda,
- Ficus pyriformis
- Ficus racemosa,
- Ficus religiosa,
- Ficus rubiginosa,
- Ficus variolosa,
- Gomphocarpus fruticosus,
- Gymnanthera oblonga,
- Hemidesmus indicus,
- Holarrhena pubescens
- Hoya australis
- Ichnocarpus frutescens,
- Leichhardtia rostrata (syn. Marsdenia rostrata),
- Leichhardtia suaveolens (syn. Marsdenia rostrata),
- Marsdenia australis,
- Nerium indicum,
- Nerium oleander,
- Parsonsia alboflavescens
- Parsonsia straminea
- Plumeria acuminata,
- Sarcostemma australe
- Secamone elliptica,
- Streblus asper,
- Toxocarpus wightianus,
- Trachelospermum bowringii,
- Tylophora indica .

It usually has some preference for certain species in a given area. The more commonly used plants are Ficus racemosa, Nerium oleander, Nerium odorum, and Cryptolepis buchananii. Ficus pumila a cultivated garden plant which climbs on walls has also been noted.

== See also ==
- Mimic
- Nymphalidae
- List of butterflies of India
- List of butterflies of India (Nymphalidae)
