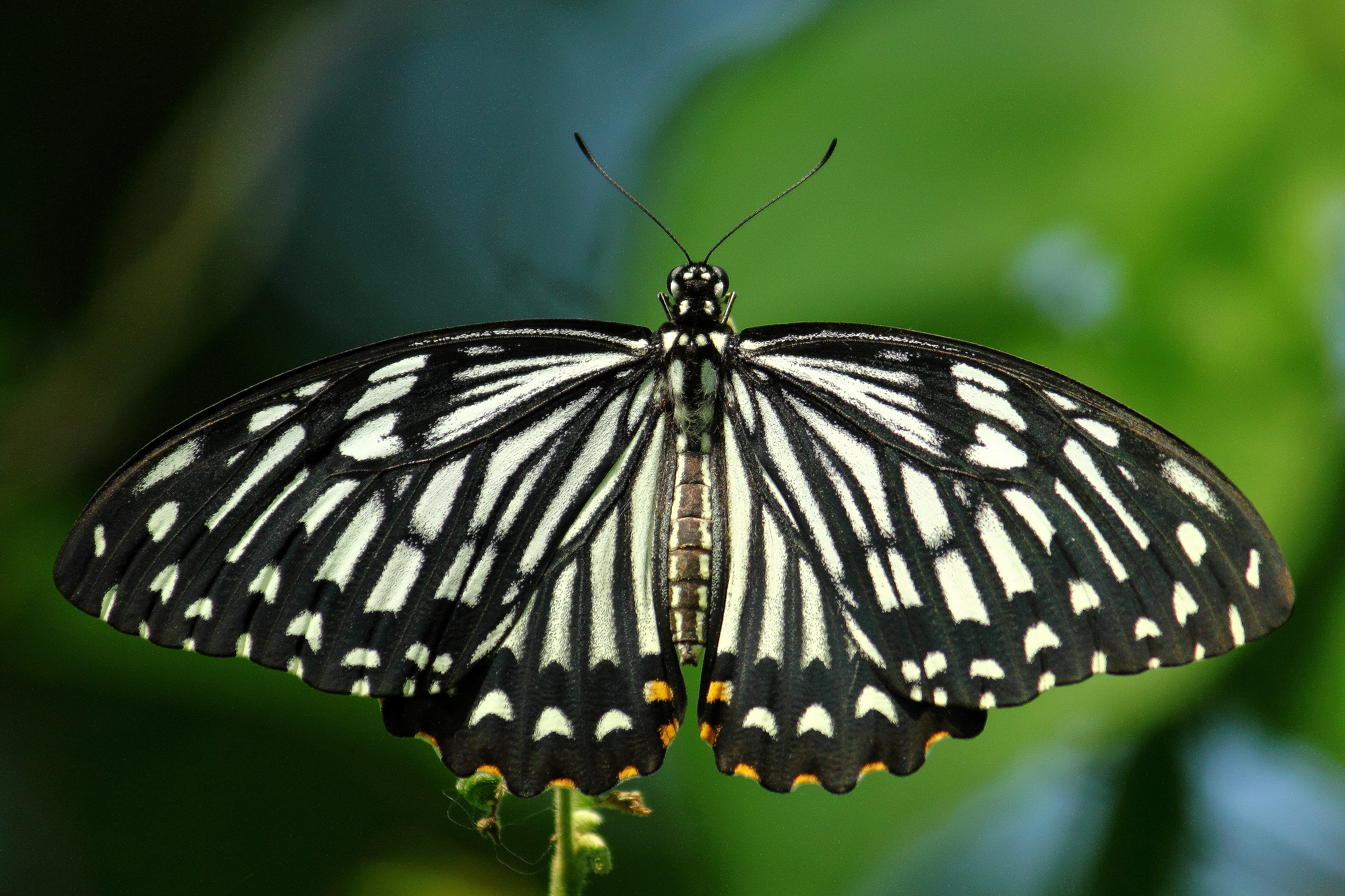
- Papilio clytia form dissimilis
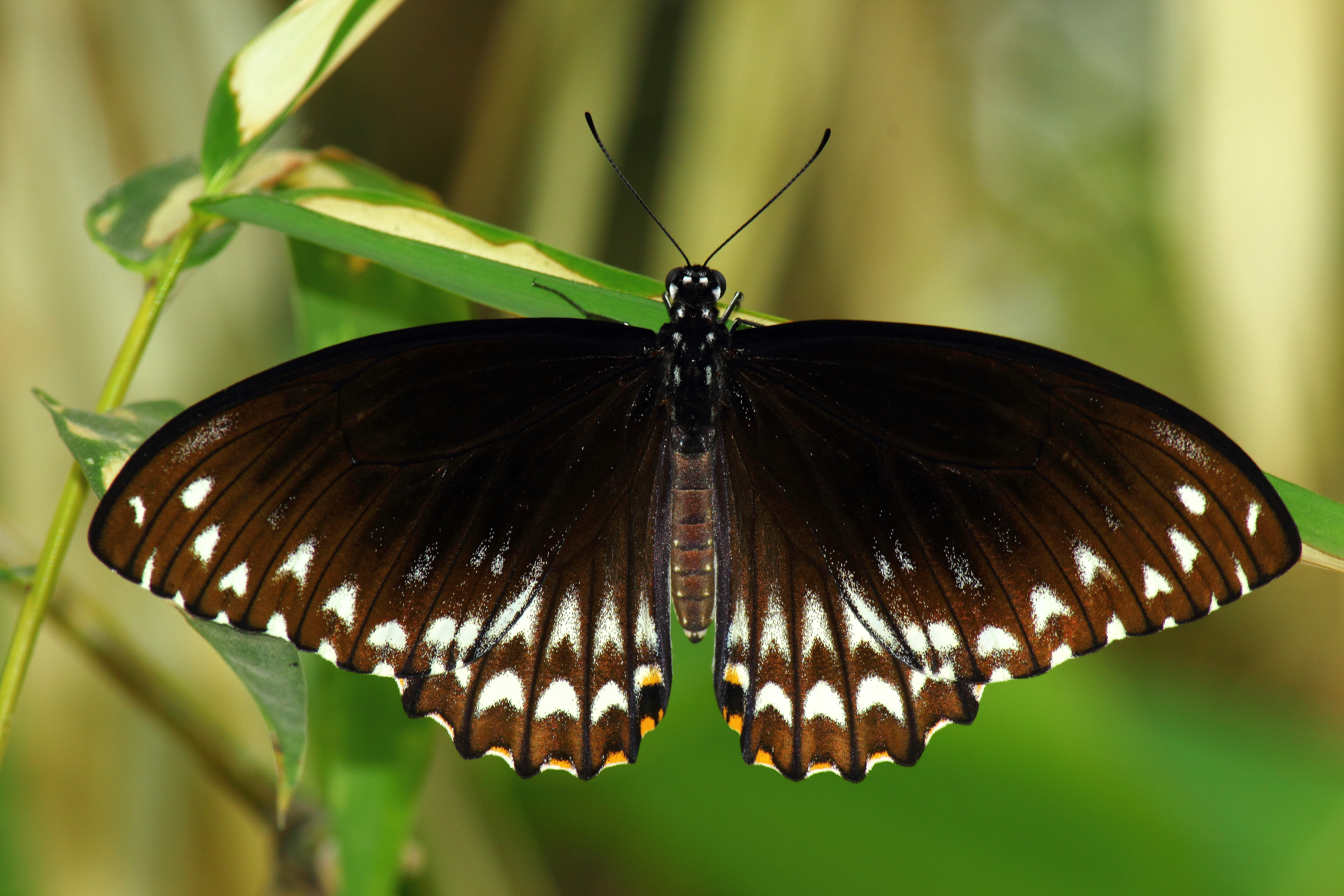
- Papilio clytia form clytia

Scientific classification
- Kingdom: Animalia
- Phylum: Arthropoda
- Clade: Pancrustacea
- Class: Insecta
- Order: Lepidoptera
- Family: Papilionidae
- Genus: Papilio
- Species: P. clytia

Binomial name
- Papilio clytia Linnaeus, 1758

Synonyms
- Chilasa clytia

= Papilio clytia =

Common mime

Species of butterfly

Papilio clytia, the common mime, is a swallowtail butterfly found in south and southeast Asia. The butterfly belongs to the subgenus Chilasa, the black-bodied swallowtails. It serves as an excellent example of a Batesian mimic among the Indian butterflies.

== Description ==
=== Form clytia ===
Both males and females have the upperside velvety black or soft dark brown.

Forewing: a subterminal series of outwardly truncate or emarginate white spots; the spot in interspace 4 shifted inwards out of line; those in interspaces 6, 7 and 8 oblique to the costa, the lowest and the upper two spots elongate; this is followed by a terminal series of smaller white spots, two in interspace 1, one above the outer, and two in interspaces 8; lastly, a single spot between the subterminal and terminal series.

Hindwing: a discal series of inwardly conical and outwardly emarginate, triangular, elongate white spots; a prominent tornal yellow spot broadly divided across the middle by a bar of the ground colour. The cilia touched with white in the interspaces; sometimes one or more of these specks on the cilia are broad and prominent and yellow in colour. Underside: from soft pale brown to rich dark velvety brown.

Forewing with the markings as on the upperside.

Hindwing: the markings also similar to those on the upperside, but the terminal margin beyond the subterminal series of white markings bears a row of comparatively large very conspicuous yellow spots, separated from the white lunules by a series of short transverse detached spots of the ground colour. Antennae, head, thorax and abdomen black, the thorax anteriorly and beneath and the abdomen on the sides spotted with white.

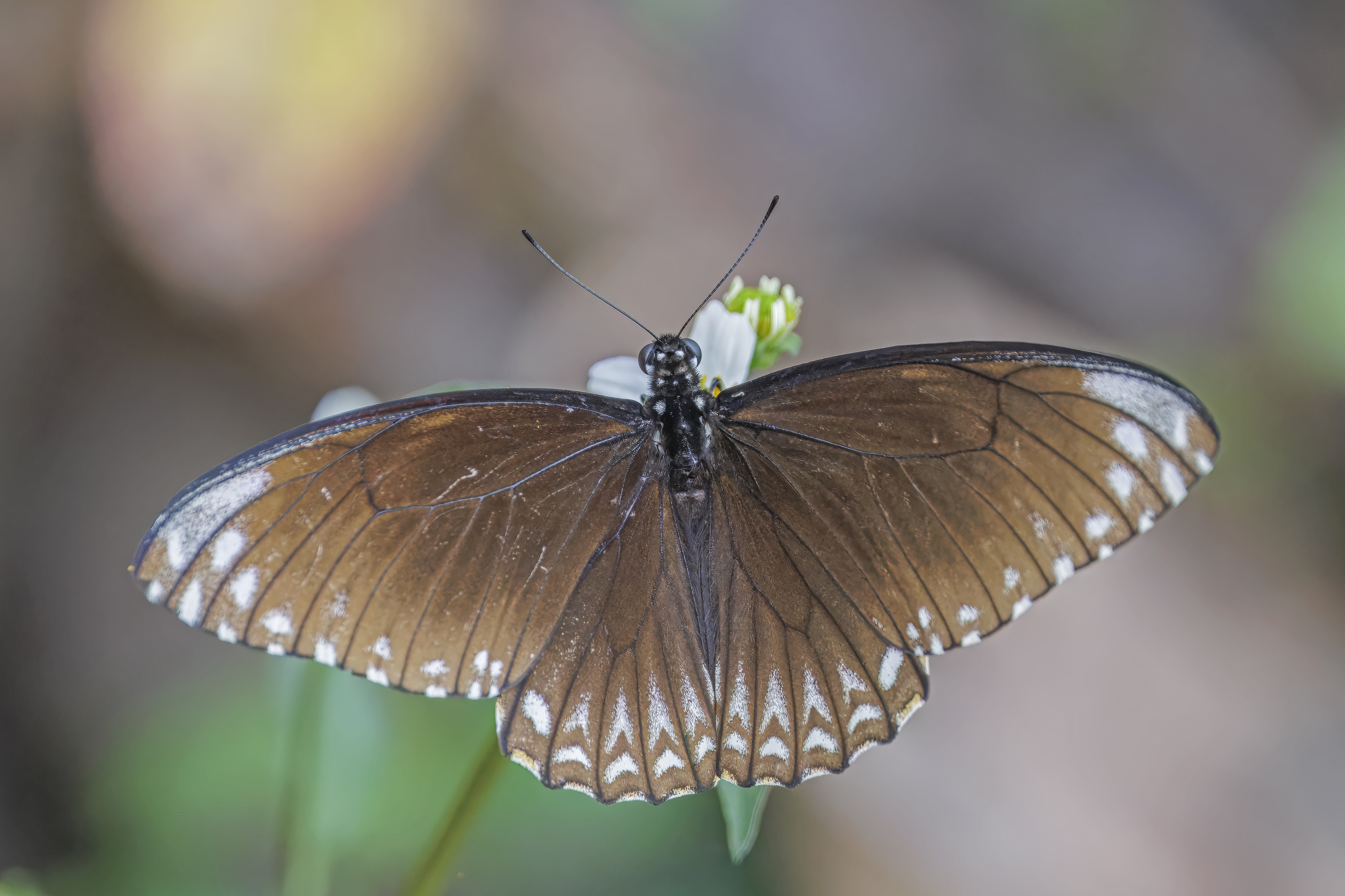
Form clytia, Laos

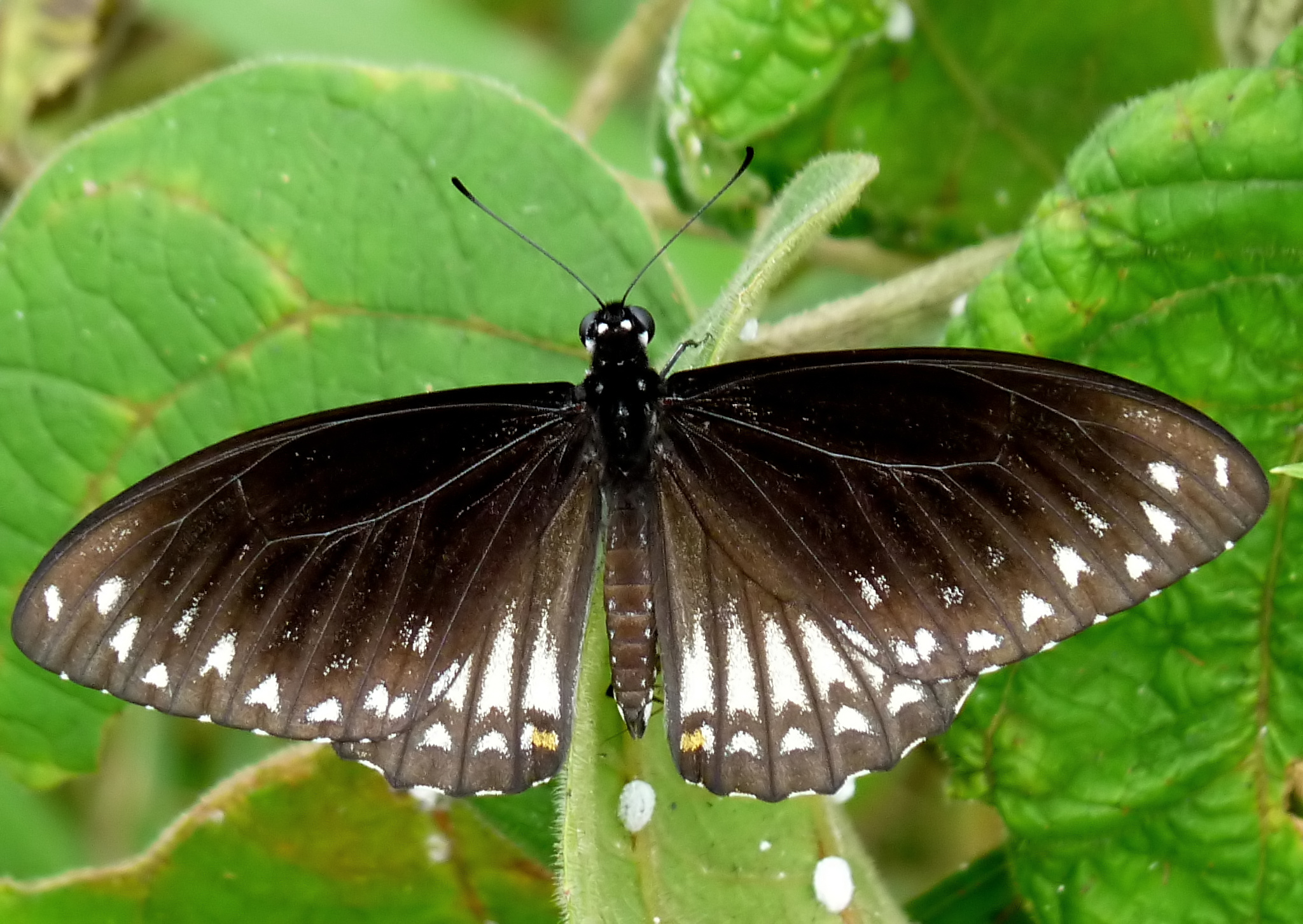
Form clytia, India

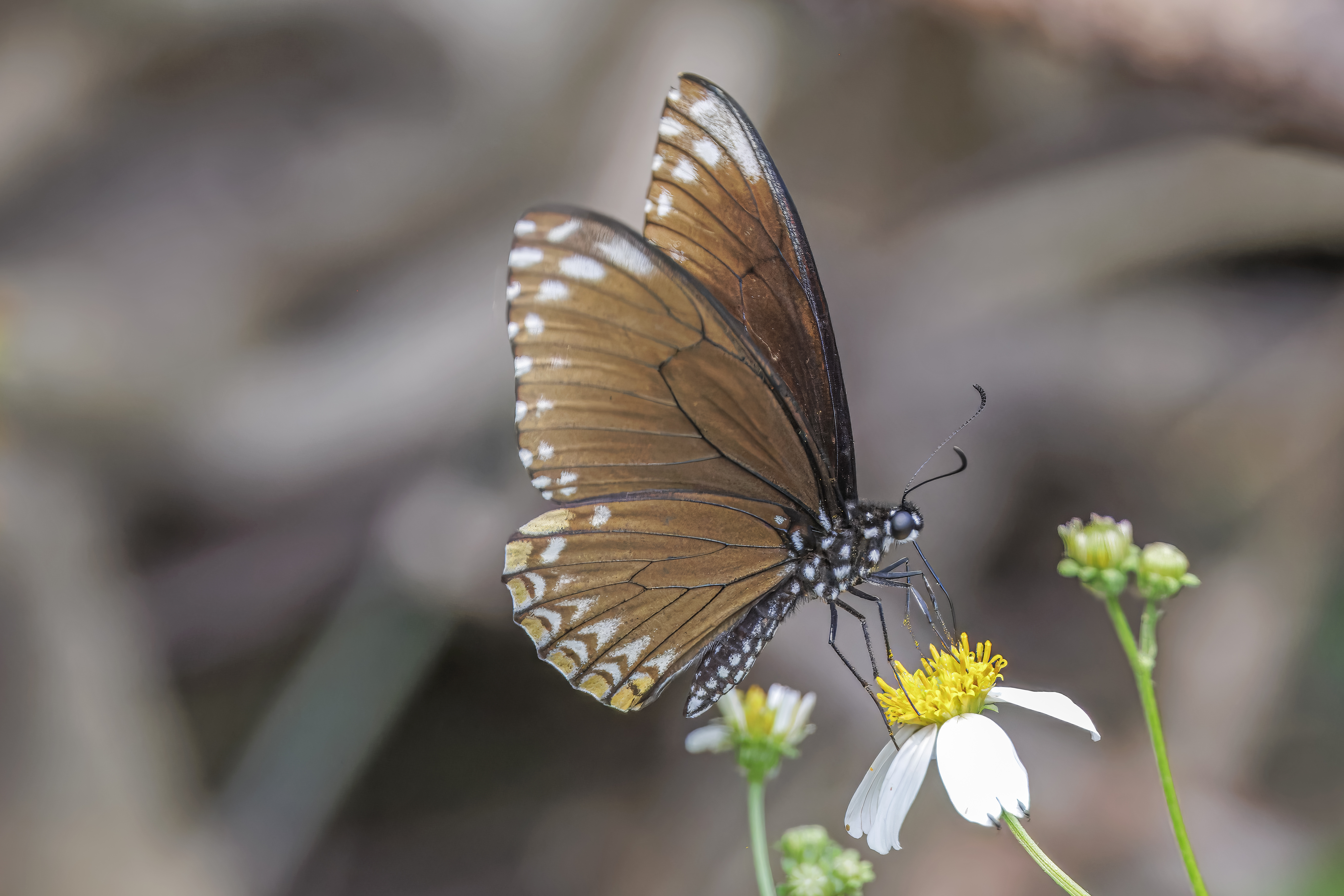
Form clytia, Laos

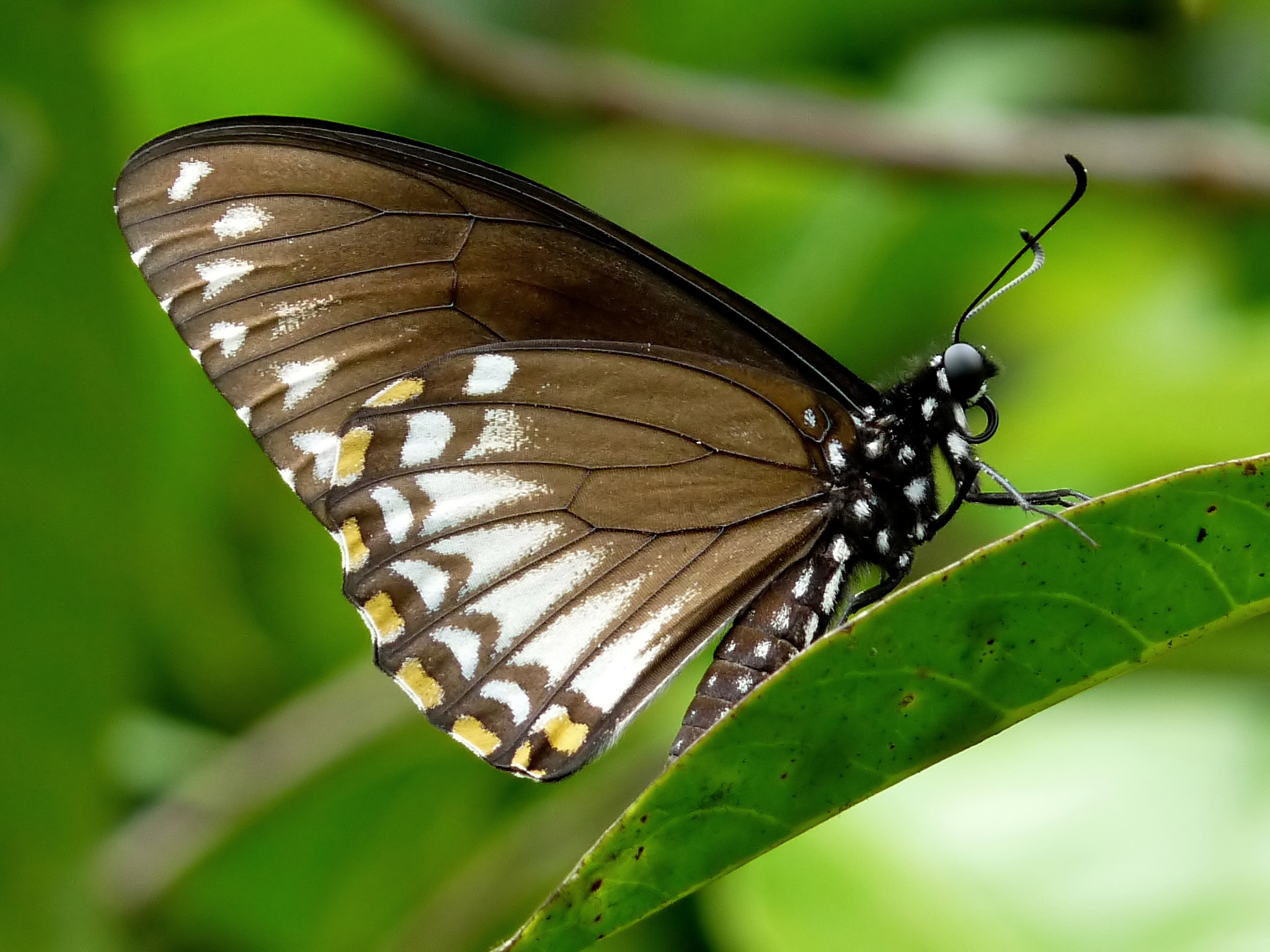
Form clytia, India

=== Form dissimilis ===
Doubleday differs from the first form as follows: Upperside, forewing: cell with four streaks coalescent at base and four spots beyond at apex, a long streak in interspace 1a, two streaks with two spots beyond which are more or less coalescent with them in interspace 1, a broad streak with an outwardly emarginate spot in interspace 2, similar spots, one at base and one beyond, in 3, a single similar spot in 4, elongate streaks in 5 and 6, and much smaller elongate spots in interspaces 8 and 9. All these streaks and spots cream-white with diffuse edges; subterminal and terminal markings as in the first form. Hindwing: markings similar to those in the first form with the following differences: discoidal cell entirely white, discal white streaks longer that reach quite up to the outer margin of the cell and are continued anteriorly to the costa by elongate streaks in interspaces 6 and 7, two spots in interspace 8 and a slender streak along the costa; the subterminal and terminal markings as in the first form. Underside similar to the upperside, the cream-white markings slightly larger, the terminal series of yellow spots on the hindwing as in the first form. Antennae, head, thorax and abdomen as in the typical clytia form; the head, thorax and abdomen with more prominent white spots.

Wingspan: 108–121 mm

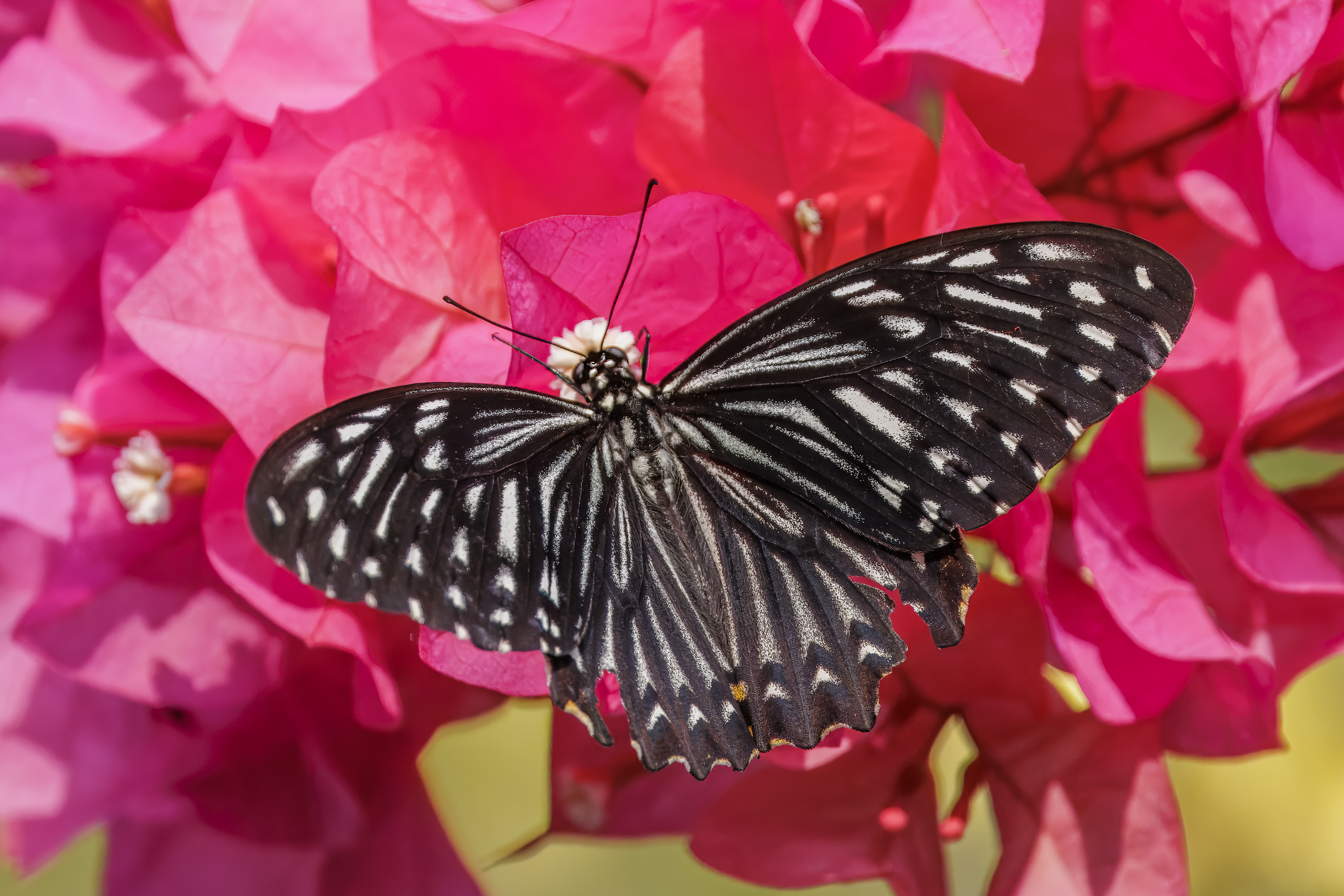
Form dissimilis

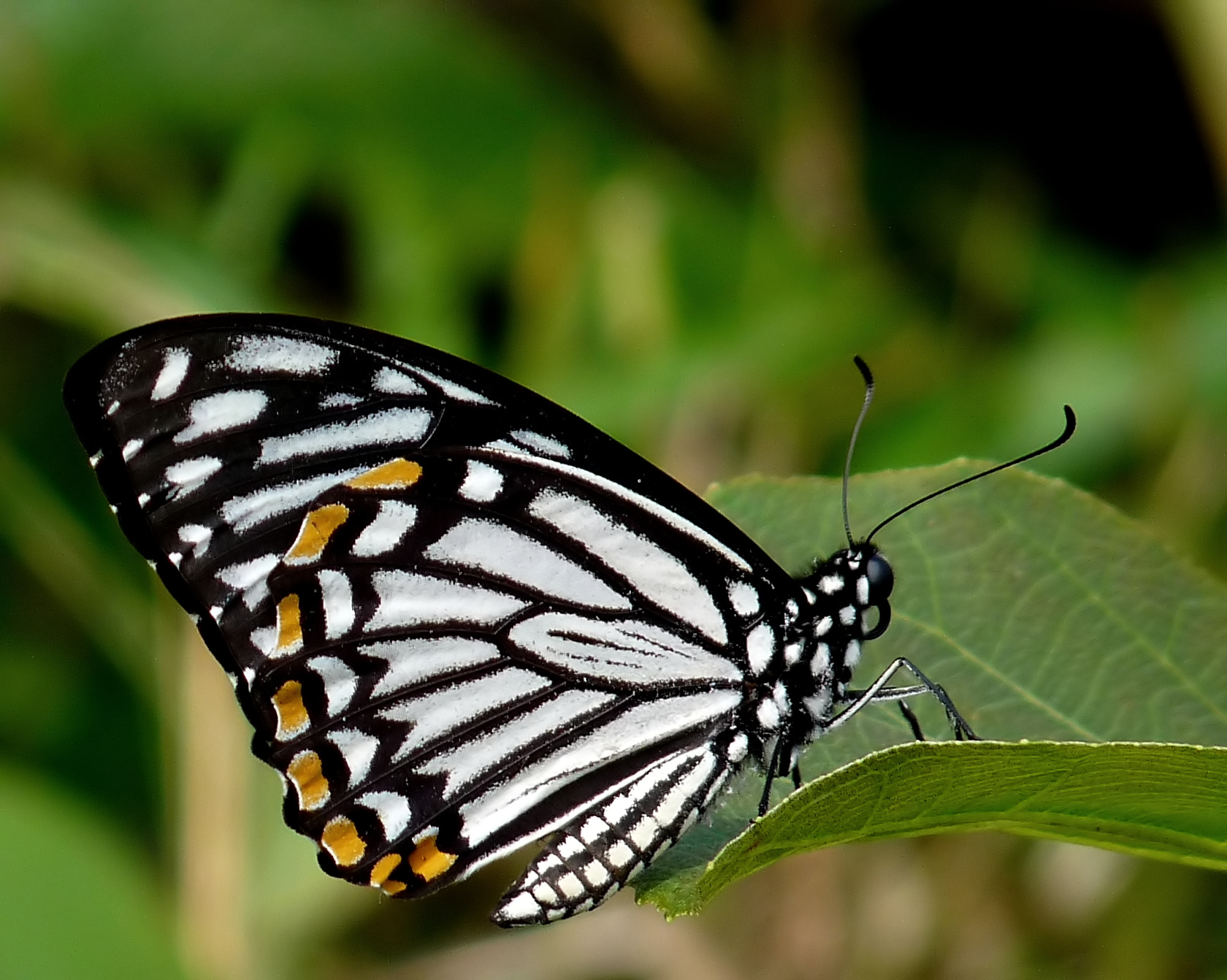
Form dissimilis

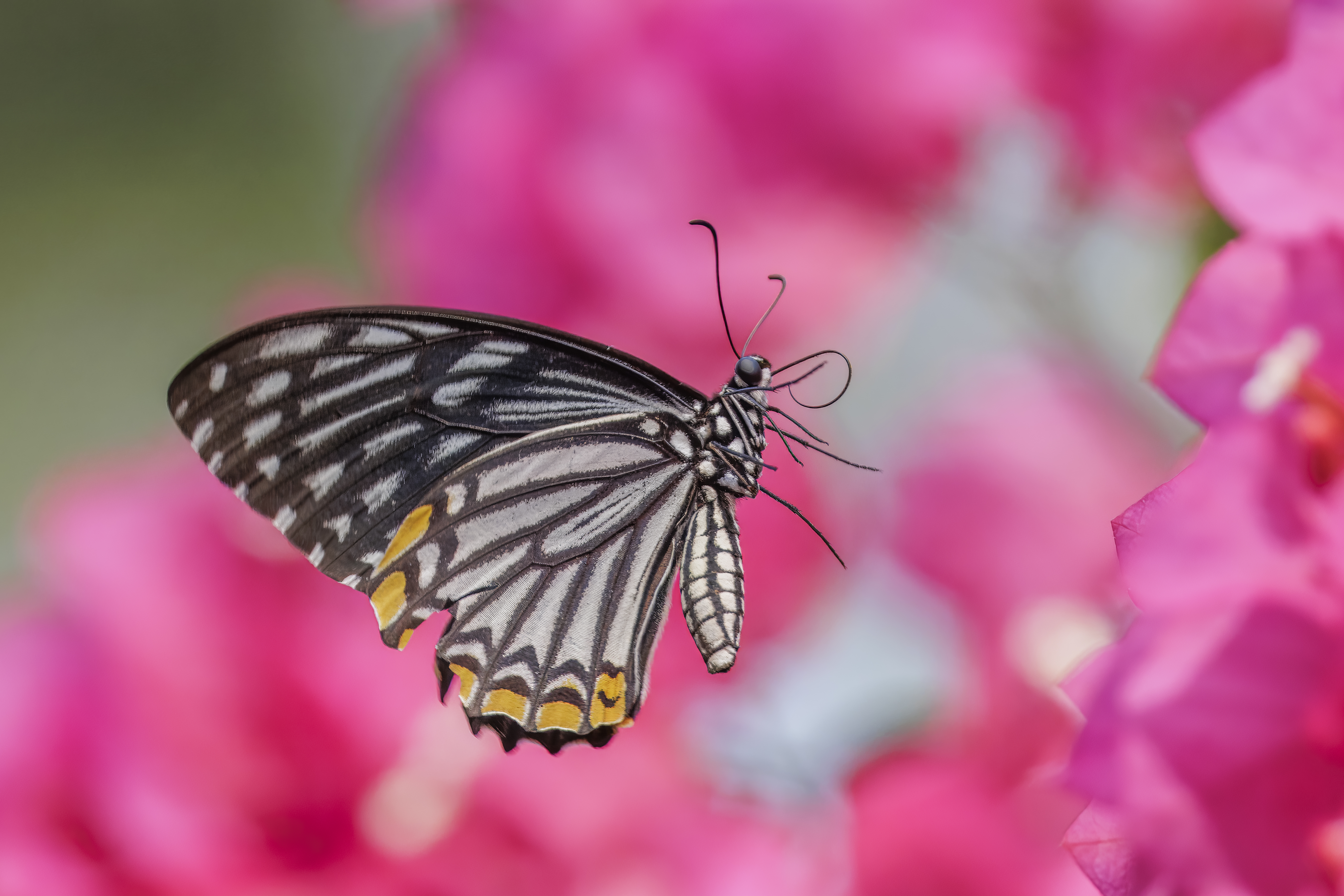
Form dissimilis in flight

=== Other forms ===
Many variations have been described and given names in the past, and many of these names may no longer be valid.

- Variety casyapa, Moore – "Forewings, besides the marginal and submarginal markings with a third discal series of one to five markings." (Rothschild quoted in Bingham)
- Variety papone, Westwood – "Forewings black, with an obvious bluish tint in certain lights; the white spots absent from the forewings or only faintly indicated." (Rothschild quoted in Bingham)
- Variety commixtus, Rothschild – "Forewings black or bluish black, with a marginal, submarginal and a subdiscal series of most feebly marked spots, and with two faint spots behind the cell and a streak along the inner margin (dorsum) white; the discal markings are often indicated by a few white scales, or are entirely absent. Hindwings with apical half of the cells, seven long discal streaks reaching the base of the respective cellules (interspaces?) ( the first and the last reach the base of the wing) and a marginal and submarginal series of spots white as in ab. dissimils, L. This aberration and examples intermediate between it and clytia I received from the Khasia Hills." (Rothschild quoted in Bingham)
- Race lankeswara (Sri Lanka) Moore – "Differs from P. clytia in the umber-brown colour of the wings and in the small submarginal spots of the forewings; from P. clytia panope, it is distinguished chiefly by the longer discal sagittiform spots of the hindwings. This subspecies has been described from slightly aberrant specimens in which the submarginal spots of the forewings are partly obliterated; in most individuals the series of these spots is complete, and on such specimens Moore's clytioides is based." (Rothschild quoted in Bingham) The dimorph or dissimilis form of this race is identical with that of P. clytia.
- Race panope, Linn. (Myanmar and into Siam and the Malay Peninsula) – "The discal sagittate spots of the hindwings are shorter than in P. clytia, sometimes they have almost disappeared from the upperside. Most frequently the marginal and submarginal markings of the forewings are more or less merged together, and form in the apex of the wing three large patches." (Rothschild quoted in Bingham) The dimorph or dissimilis form of this race also resembles that of the typical form.
- Variety janus, Fruhstorfer – The subterminal and terminal white markings on the forewings only faintly indicated or replaced by small black spots centred sometimes with obscure white. The white sagittate subterminal markings with obscure white. The white sagittate subterminal markings on the hindwing are in most specimens small and obscured by an irroration of dark scales.
- Race flavolimbatus, Oberthür (The Andamans) – Closely resembles the dissimils form of clytia; differs as follows: both males and females distinctly larger, the white markings similar but proportionately larger, with the exception of the streaks in the discoidal cells of both forewings and hindwings, which are narrower and less firmly defined; on the hindwing there is a terminal row of ochraceous-yellow spots on the upper as well as on the underside, while those on the underside are very much larger than in P. clytia, dimorph dissimilis. The dark form clytia or any race of it is apparently unknown in the Andamans.

== Distribution ==
This butterfly is found in India from Kangra to Sikkim, from Assam to Myanmar, Nepal, Bangladesh, Peninsular India and the Andaman Islands. It is also found in Sri Lanka, Thailand, southern China (including Hainan), Hong Kong, Vietnam, Laos, Kampuchea, peninsular Malaysia, Philippines and Indonesia (Flores, Alor, Timor and Moa). Several regional variants and forms are recognized.

== Status ==
Generally common and not threatened. The nominate subspecies is protected by law in India.

== Habitat ==
This is a butterfly of hilly regions but also found at lower elevations. It is plentiful in the pre-monsoon and monsoon period and becomes scarce later on.

== Habits ==
The common mime has two mimetic forms in both sexes. The nominate form P. clytia form clytia mimics the common Indian crow (Euploea core) while the form dissimilis mimics the blue tiger (Tirumala limniace).

The flight of the mime also resembles that of the model, fluttering, neither weak nor strong, sometimes staying close to the ground and at other times flying strongly up into the treetops. It mud-puddles on stream banks in summer. Known to bask and usually sits with the wings spread wide open while feeding on nectar from flowers.

== Life history ==
=== Eggs ===
Spherical, shiny and orange yellow, laid on the upper surface of leaves.

=== Larva ===
The larvae and pupa are stated by Mackinnon to resemble closely the larva and pupa of P. agestor. Davidson and Aitken's description of them is as follows: "Not unlike the larva of the Ornithoptera group in form, having similar rows of fleshy processes, but it is by far the handsomest Papilio larva we know, being of a dark umber-brown colour with a bright red spot at the base of each process, a dorsal row of large irregular yellow patches and a partial lateral row ending in a diagonal band which connects the two."

Larva of Papilio clytia

Velvet black or dark green. Has carmine spots. Has a dark red-brown longitudinal band and red spots. Two rows of sharp spines on segments 1 to 4 and single row on the others. The osmeterium is light indigo blue.

==== Larval host plants ====
The larvae feed on species of the laurel family Lauraceae

- Alseodaphne semecarpifolia
- Cinnamomum camphora
- Cinnamonum macrocarpum
- Cinnamomum verum
- Litsea chinensis
- Litsea deccansis
- Litsea glutinosa
- Tetranthera apetala

=== Pupa ===
"Is unique, exhibiting one of the most remarkable instances of protective resemblance we know. It exactly resembles a dead twig about an inch long and less than a quarter of an inch in diameter, broken of irregularly at one end. The last segment is so modified that the pupa is not attached by one point, but appears as if it had grown out of the branch to which it affixes itself."

An inch in length, brownish with streaks and blotches. Rough surface with tubercles. Has uncanny resemblance to a broken twig and is suspended at an appropriate angle.

Life cycle

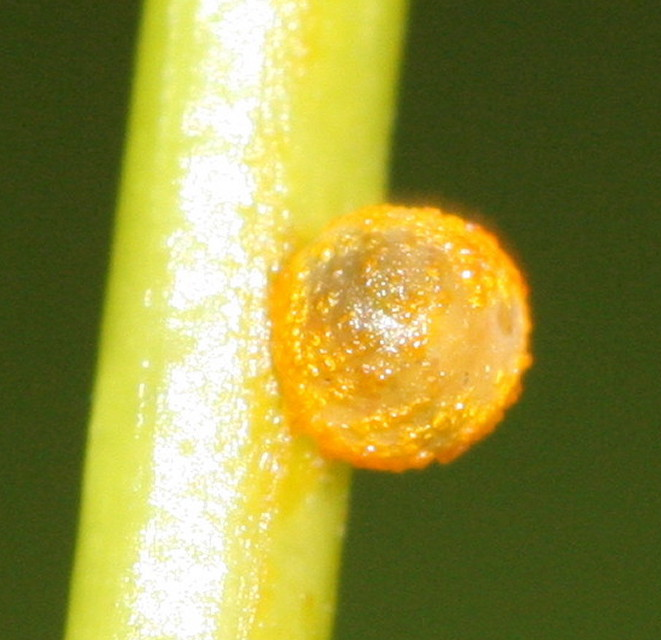
Egg

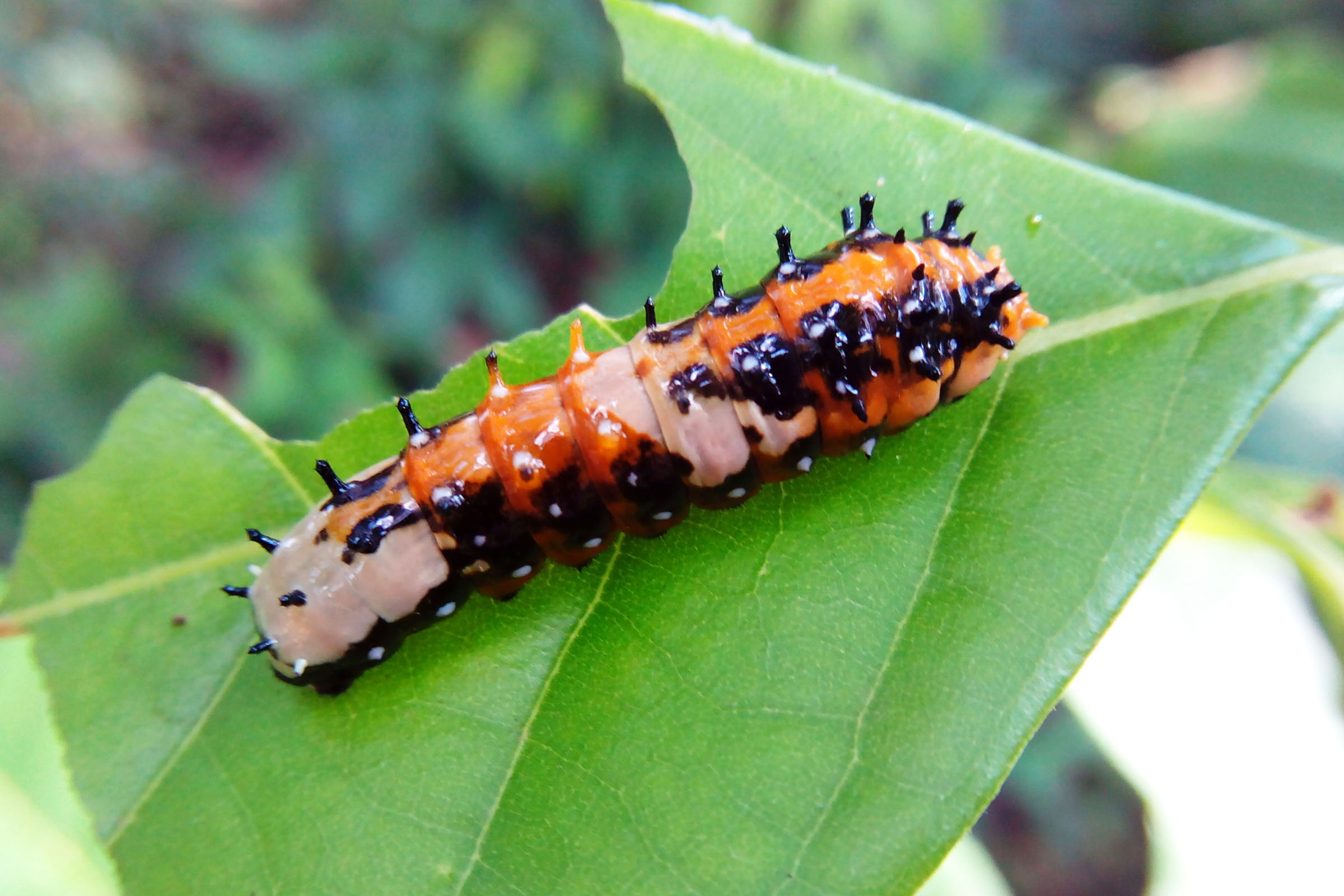
Larva

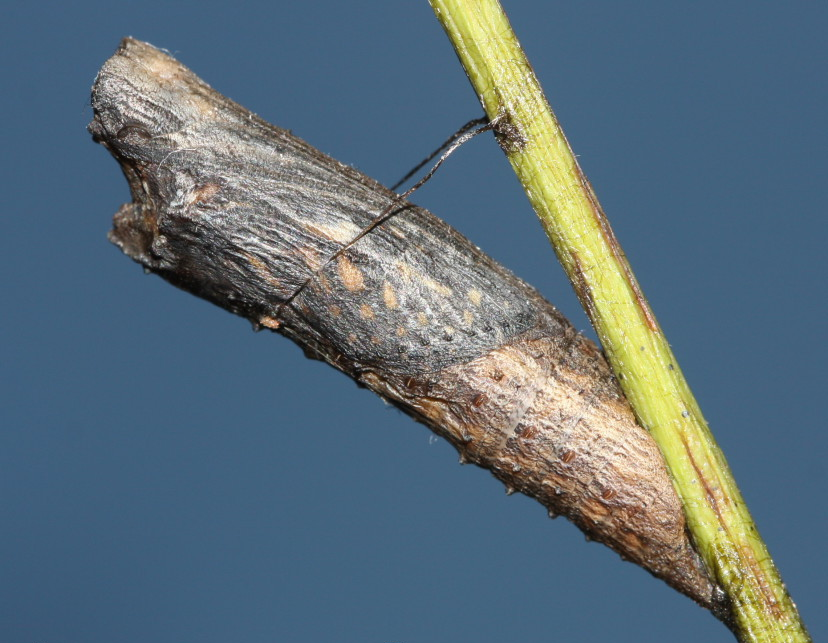
Chrysalis

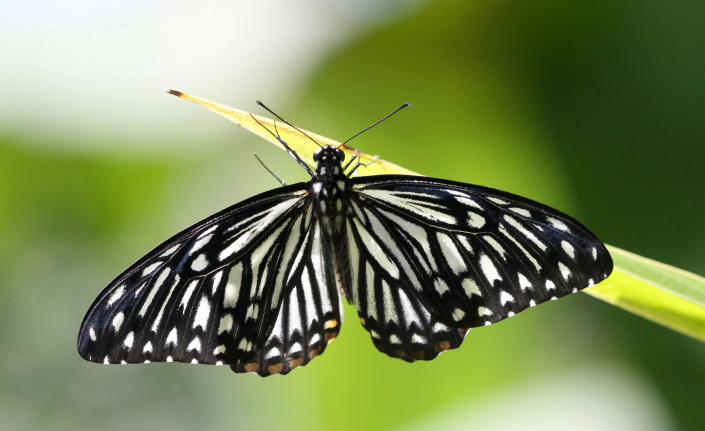
Imago (form dissimilis)

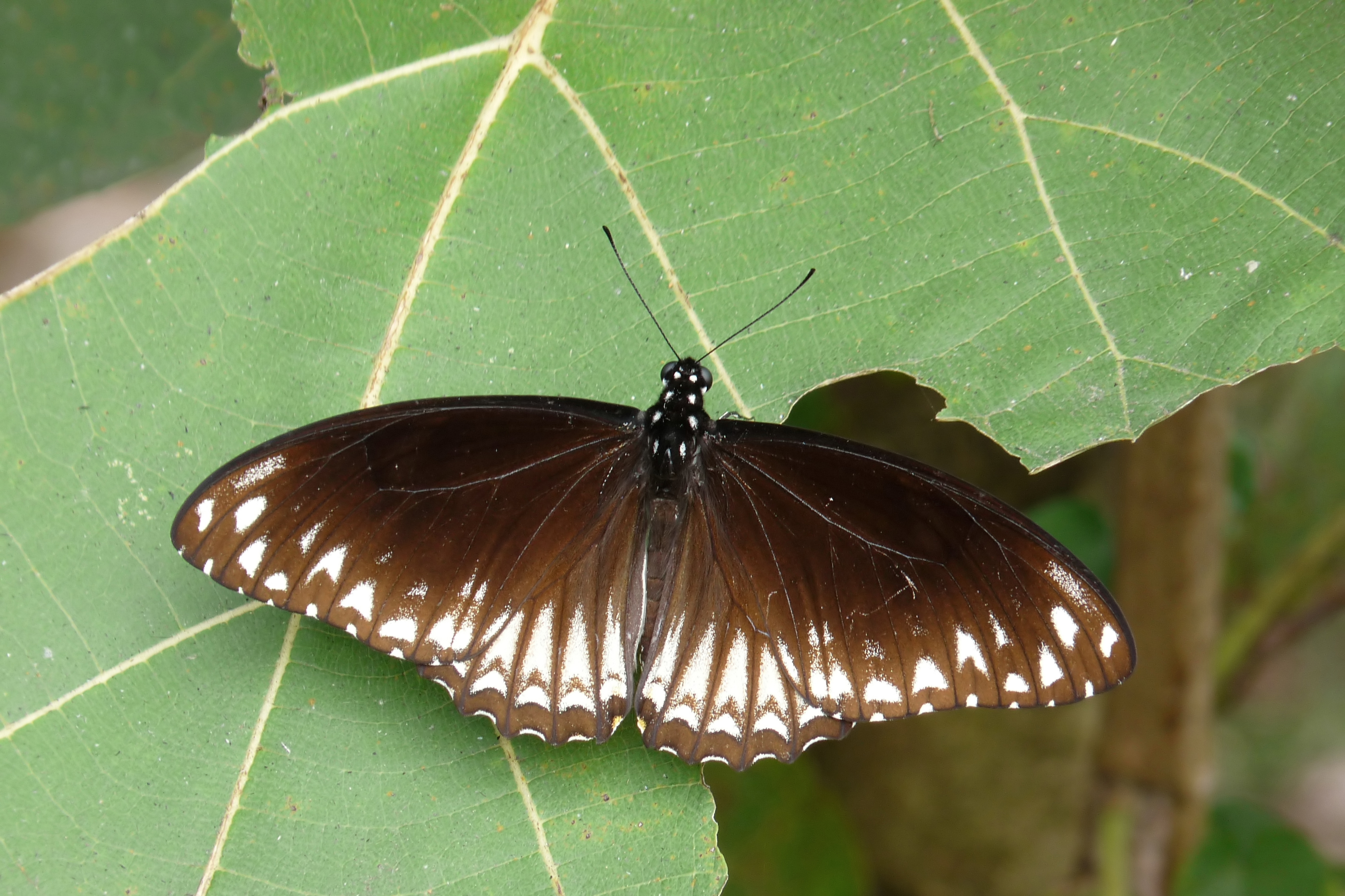
Imago (form clytia)

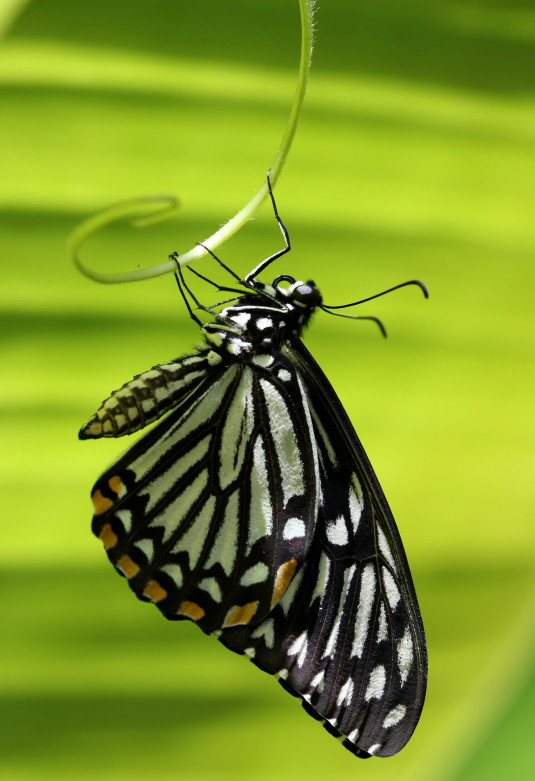
Imago (form dissimilis)

Papilio clytia_larva from Kerala

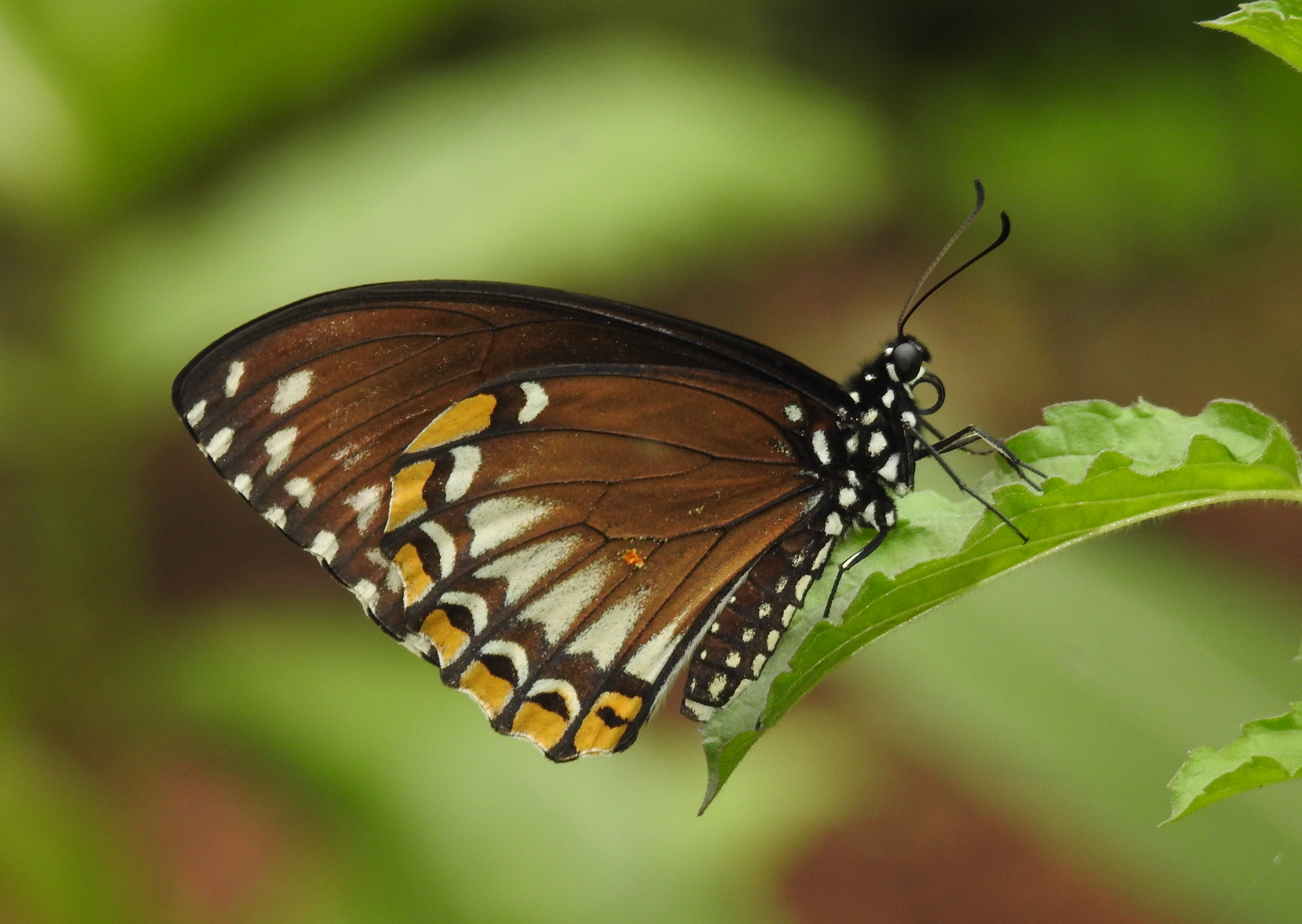
Imago (form clytia)

== Key to forms ==
From Bingham, C. T. (1907). The Fauna of British India, Including Ceylon and Burma. Butterflies. Vol 2.

- A. Forewing upperside: not glossed with blue, or if blue-glossed, then wing uniform without other markings.
  - a. Basal half or more of both forewing and hindwing uniform without white markings.
    - a^{1}. Forewing upperside: no blue gloss at base.
      - a^{2}. Forewing upperside with prominent subterminal and terminal, sometimes also a postdiscal, series of white spots.
        - a^{3}. These spots not elongate, not coalescent towards apex and not formed into a prominent apical white patch.
          - P. clytia
        - b^{3}. These spots elongate and coalescent towards apex and there form a prominent white patch.
          - P. clytia race panope
      - b^{2}. Forewing upperside without or with only more or less obsolescent series of subterminal and terminal white spots; such spots when present always very small.
        - P. clytia race lankeswara
    - b^{1}. Forewing upperside with a more or less obvious blue gloss at base.
      - P. clytia variety papone
  - b. Basal half of forewing and hindwing not uniform, with a streak in cell and in posterior interspaces.
    - a1. Hindwing upperside: discal series of white streaks broad and long; underside: terminal series of ochraceous-yellow spots not remarkably large.
      - P. clytia dimorph dissimils
    - b^{1}. Hindwing upperside: discal series of white streaks short and narrow; underside: terminal series of ochraceous-yellow spots remarkably large.
      - P. clytia race flavolimbatus
- B. Forewing upperside: richly glossed with blue.
  - a. Hindwing: male without, female with, whitish streaks in cell and interspaces that extend up to base of wing.
    - P. paradoxus race telearchus
  - b. Hindwing: Male and female with white discal markings, but none that extend up to base of wing
    - P. caunus race danisepa.

== Other references ==
- Evans, W.H. (1932). The Identification of Indian Butterflies (2nd ed.). Mumbai, India: Bombay Natural History Society.
- Gay, Thomas; Kehimkar, Isaac David; Punetha, Jagdish Chandra (1992). Common Butterflies of India. Nature Guides. Bombay, India: World Wide Fund for Nature-India by Oxford University Press. ISBN 978-0195631647.
- Haribal, Meena (1992). The Butterflies of Sikkim Himalaya and Their Natural History. Gangtok, Sikkim, India: Sikkim Nature Conservation Foundation.
- Kunte, Krushnamegh (2000). Butterflies of Peninsular India. India, A Lifescape. Hyderabad, India: Universities Press. ISBN 978-8173713545.
- Wynter-Blyth, Mark Alexander (1957). Butterflies of the Indian Region. Bombay, India: Bombay Natural History Society. ISBN 978-8170192329.
