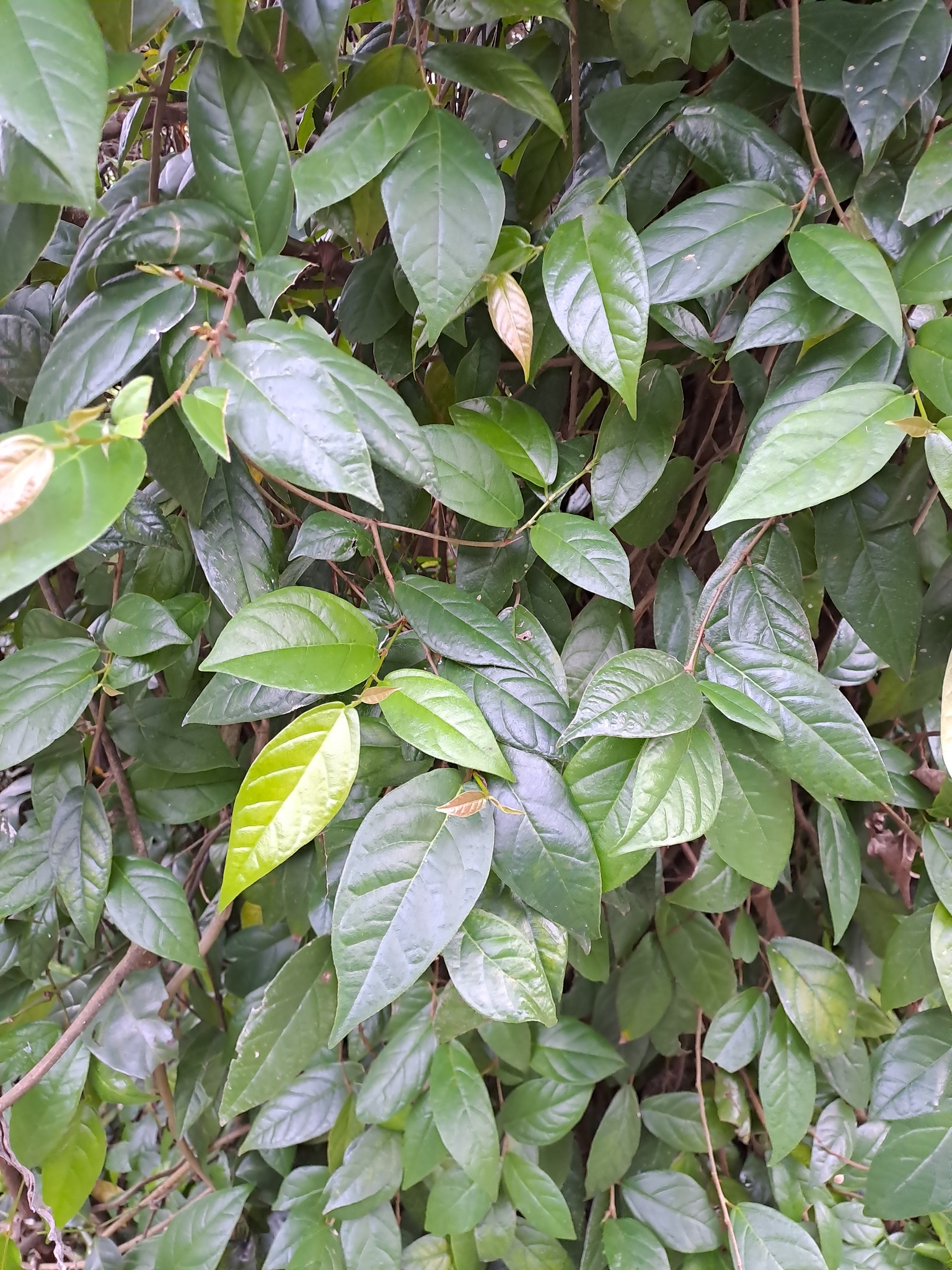
- Ficus hederacea in Hong Kong

Scientific classification
- Kingdom: Plantae
- Clade: Tracheophytes
- Clade: Angiosperms
- Clade: Eudicots
- Clade: Rosids
- Order: Rosales
- Family: Moraceae
- Genus: Ficus
- Subgenus: F. subg. Synoecia
- Species: F. hederacea

Binomial name
- Ficus hederacea Roxb.

Synonyms
- Ficus triplinervis Buch.-Ham. ex Wall. Ficus scandens Roxb. Ficus longipes Griff. Ficus fruticosa Roxb. Ficus crustacea Wall. Ficus cantoniensis Bodinier ex Lév. Ficus anabatos Voigt

= Ficus hederacea =

Species of climbing fig

Ficus hederacea is a climbing fig species, in the family Moraceae, which can be found in the Himalayas, southern China and Indo-China. In Vietnam it may be called sung leo. No subspecies are listed in the Catalogue of Life.
