= Ficus pandurata =

Scientific classification
- Kingdom: Plantae
- Clade: Tracheophytes
- Clade: Angiosperms
- Clade: Eudicots
- Clade: Rosids
- Order: Rosales
- Family: Moraceae
- Tribe: Ficeae
- Genus: Ficus
- Subgenus: F. subg. Ficus
- Species: F. pandurata

Binomial name
- Ficus pandurata Hance

Species of fig tree from Asia

Ficus pandurata is a fig species in the family Moraceae. No subspecies are recorded and the native range of this species is southern China and Indo-China. The species can be found in Vietnam: where it may be called sung tì bà.
