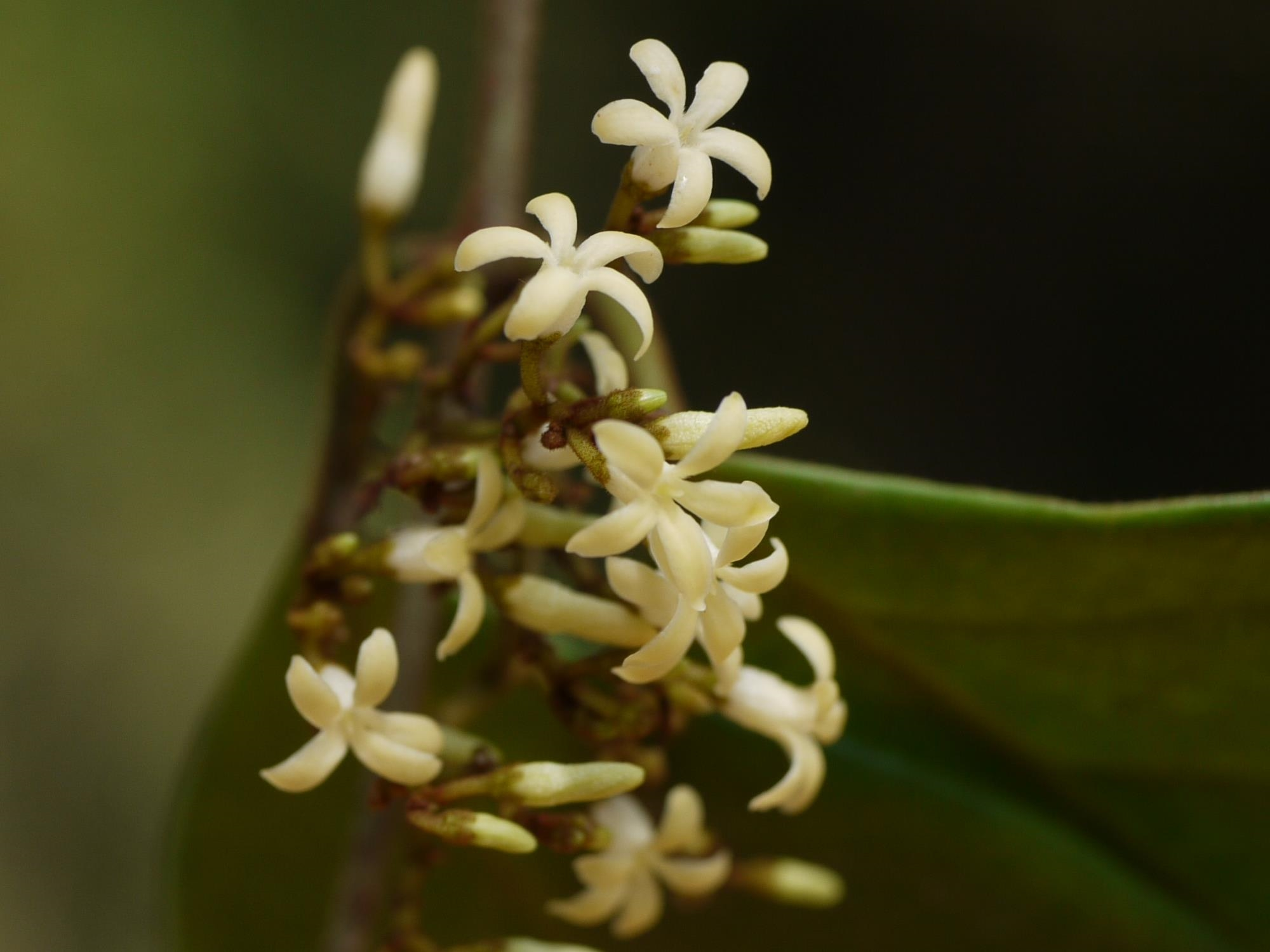
- Toxocarpus kleinii

Scientific classification
- Kingdom: Plantae
- Clade: Tracheophytes
- Clade: Angiosperms
- Clade: Eudicots
- Clade: Asterids
- Order: Gentianales
- Family: Apocynaceae
- Subfamily: Secamonoideae
- Genus: Toxocarpus; Wight & Arn.

= Toxocarpus =

Genus of flowering plants

Toxocarpus is a genus of plants in the family Apocynaceae.

It is native to China, the Himalayas, and Southeast Asia.

== Species ==
Accepted species

1. Toxocarpus aurantiacus C.Y. Wu - Yunnan
2. Toxocarpus fuscus Tsiang - Guangdong, Guangxi, Yunnan
3. Toxocarpus hainanensis Tsiang - Hainan
4. Toxocarpus himalensis Falc. ex Hook. f. - Guangxi, Guizhou, Yunnan, Assam, Uttarakhand
5. Toxocarpus insularis (Miq.) Bakh. f. - Java
6. Toxocarpus laevigatus Tsiang - Hainan
7. Toxocarpus patens Tsiang - Hainan
8. Toxocarpus paucinervius Tsiang - Guangxi, Yunnan
9. Toxocarpus villosus (Blume) Decne. - S China, Indochina, Indonesia
10. Toxocarpus wangianus Tsiang - Guizhou, Yunnan
11. Toxocarpus wightianus Hook. & Arn. - S China, Vietnam, India

Species listed as "unresolved," i.e., of uncertain affinities

1. Toxocarpus auriculatus
2. Toxocarpus barbatus
3. Toxocarpus batanensis
4. Toxocarpus beddomei
5. Toxocarpus bonii
6. Toxocarpus borneensis
7. Toxocarpus concanensis
8. Toxocarpus curtisii
9. Toxocarpus cyclosepalus
10. Toxocarpus ellipticus
11. Toxocarpus elmeri
12. Toxocarpus eriocarpus
13. Toxocarpus excisus
14. Toxocarpus fenixii
15. Toxocarpus gagnepainii
16. Toxocarpus glabrescens
17. Toxocarpus glaucus
18. Toxocarpus gracilis
19. Toxocarpus griffithii
20. Toxocarpus hosseusii
21. Toxocarpus kleinii
22. Toxocarpus klossii
23. Toxocarpus kurzii
24. Toxocarpus lagenifer
25. Toxocarpus lankawiensis
26. Toxocarpus lineatus
27. Toxocarpus loheri
28. Toxocarpus longipetalus
29. Toxocarpus longistigma
30. Toxocarpus lujaei
31. Toxocarpus maritimus
32. Toxocarpus merrillii
33. Toxocarpus oblanceolatus
34. Toxocarpus oblongifolius
35. Toxocarpus oliganthus
36. Toxocarpus orientalis
37. Toxocarpus ovatus
38. Toxocarpus palghatensis
39. Toxocarpus papuanus
40. Toxocarpus parviflorus
41. Toxocarpus pauciflorus
42. Toxocarpus penangianus
43. Toxocarpus pierrei
44. Toxocarpus rhopalophorus
45. Toxocarpus roxburghii
46. Toxocarpus rubricaulis
47. Toxocarpus scortechinii
48. Toxocarpus siamensis
49. Toxocarpus spirei

formerly included

Species moved to other genera (Calyptranthera, Genianthus, Jasminanthes, Pervillaea, Secamone)

1. T. acuminatus, syn of Goniostemma acuminata
2. T. africanus, syn of Secamone africana
3. T. ankarensis, syn of Secamone ankarensis
4. T. blumei, syn of Genianthus blumei
5. T. brevipes, syn of Secamone brevipes
6. T. caudiclavus, syn of Calyptranthera caudiclava
7. T. crassifolius, syn of Secamone crassifolia
8. T. decaryi, syn of Pervillaea decaryi
9. T. laurifolius, syn of Genianthus laurifolius
10. T. leonensis, syn of Secamone afzelii
11. T. letouzeanus, syn of Secamone letouzeana
12. T. macrophyllus, syn of Genianthus macrophyllus
13. T. mucronatus, syn of Jasminanthes mucronata
14. T. racemosus, syn of Secamone racemosa
15. T. schimperianus, syn of Secamone schimperiana
16. T. sulfureus, syn of Secamone sulfurea
17. T. tomentosus, syn of Pervillaea tomentosa
