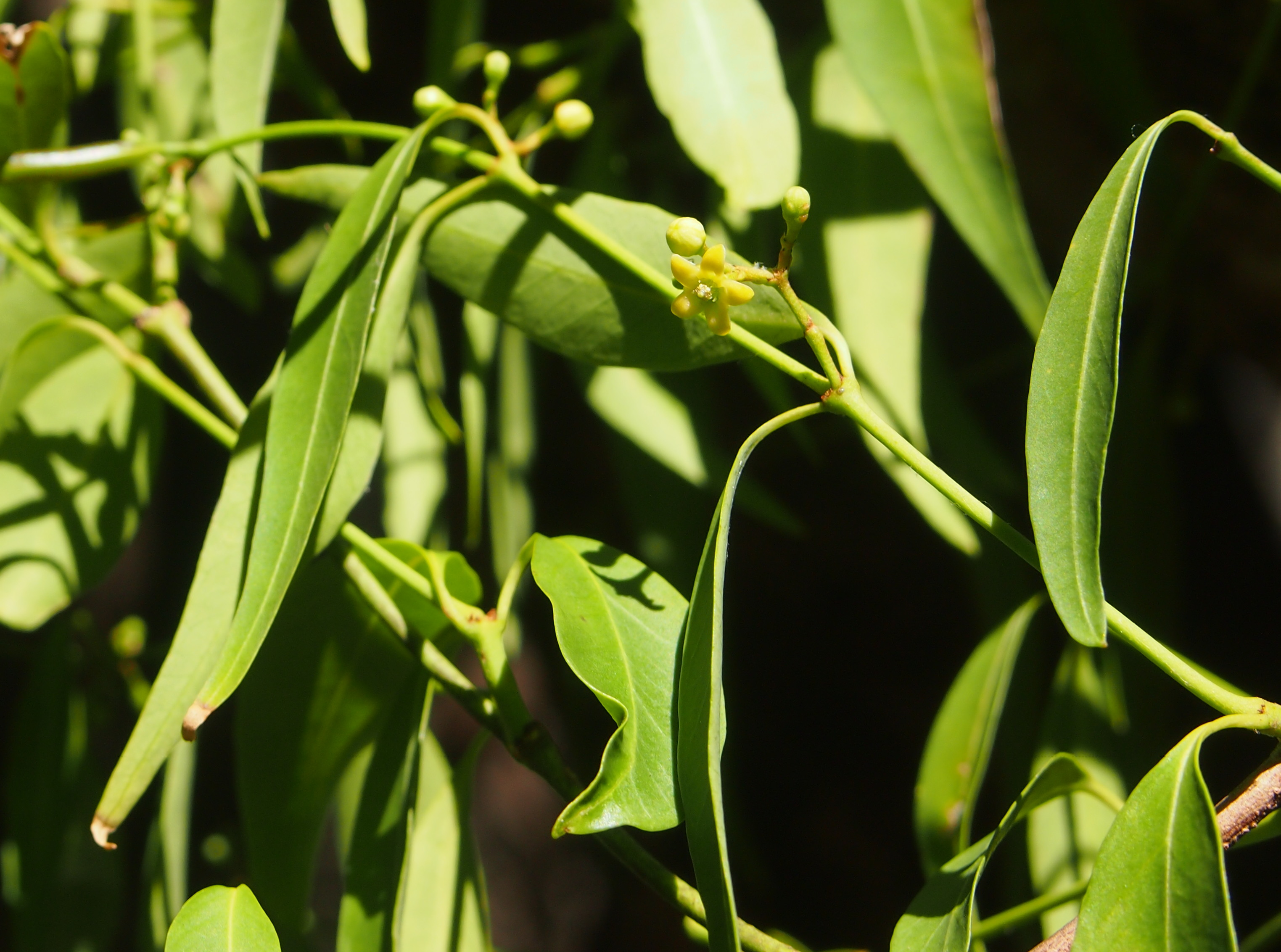
- Secamone elliptica foliage and flower

Scientific classification
- Kingdom: Plantae
- Clade: Tracheophytes
- Clade: Angiosperms
- Clade: Eudicots
- Clade: Asterids
- Order: Gentianales
- Family: Apocynaceae
- Subfamily: Secamonoideae; Endl.

= Secamonoideae =

Subfamily of plants

Secamonoideae is a subfamily of the dogbane family, Apocynaceae. It was previously included in the family Asclepiadaceae before that family was split into three subfamilies, Asclepiadoideae, Periplocoideae and Secamonoideae and all were placed with the plants already included in the Apocynaceae, now the subfamilies Rauvolfioideae and Apocynoideae.

== Genera ==
- Calyptranthera Klack., 1996
- Genianthus Hook. f., 1883
- Goniostemma Wight, 1834
- Pervillaea Decne., 1844
- Secamone R. Br., 1810
- Secamonopsis Jum., 1908
- Toxocarpus Wight & Arn., 1834
- Trichosandra Decne., 1844
