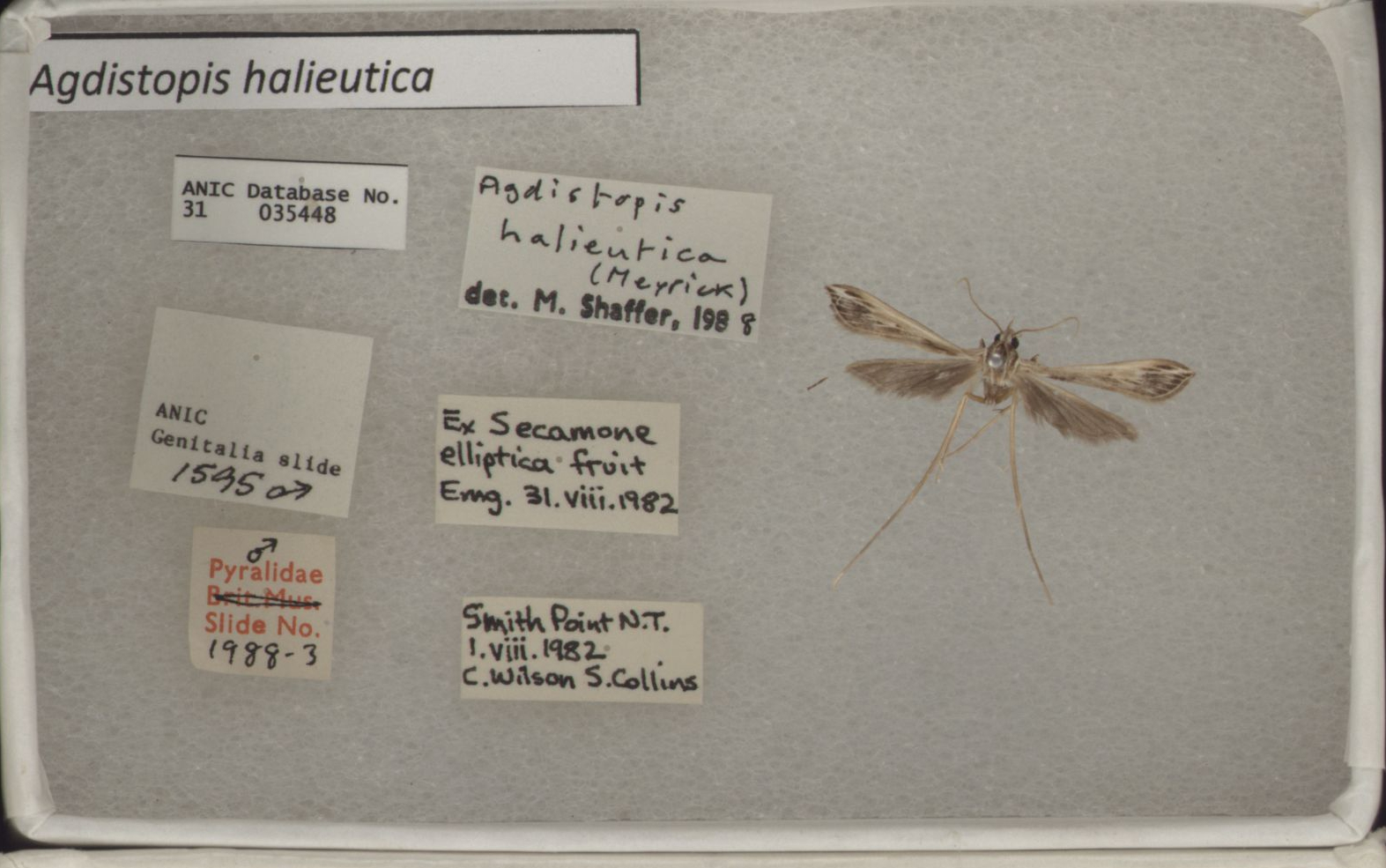
- Agdistopis halieutica (Meyrick, 1932), specimen (lacking abdomen) from Australian National Insect Collection (ANIC), reared from fruit of Secamone elliptica.

Scientific classification
- Kingdom: Animalia
- Phylum: Arthropoda
- Class: Insecta
- Order: Lepidoptera
- Family: Macropiratidae
- Genus: Agdistopis
- Species: A. halieutica

Binomial name
- Agdistopis halieutica (Meyrick, 1932)

Synonyms
- Macropiratis halieutica Meyrick, 1932

= Agdistopis halieutica =

Species of moth

Agdistopis halieutica is a moth in the Macropiratidae family. It is found from Australia (Northern Territory and Queensland) and New Guinea to Fiji.

The species was first described by Edward Meyrick in 1932 as the type species of a new genus Macropiratis:

Macropiratis halieutica, n. sp.

♂. 29 mm. Head light fuscous, face oblique. Palpi fuscous, very long (4), cylindrical, somewhat thickened and slightly roughened above towards base, terminal joint short, obtuse. Antennal ciliations short. Thorax light fuscous mixed whitish. Forewings very elongate, very narrow at base, gradually dilated, costa moderately arched near apex, termen slightly rounded, oblique; 2 from 3/4; fuscous; costal half whitish-ochreous from base to about 4/5, and neuration sharply marked by white lines along veins 2-8; some dark reddish-brown suffusion beyond this pale area, and on its lower edge in middle of disc; an oblique white streak from apex curved downwards towards tornus but becoming obsolete between veins 4 and 5; a white terminal line preceded by some darker suffusion: cilia brownish becoming whitish towards tips, and with a white bar at apex. Hindwings grey; cilia light grey.

FIJI, Lautoka, November (H. Phillips); 1 ex. (Brit. Mus.).

The larvae feed on the fruit of Secamone elliptica.
