= Macropiratidae =

Scientific classification
- Kingdom: Animalia
- Phylum: Arthropoda
- Class: Insecta
- Order: Lepidoptera
- Family: Macropiratidae; Meyrick, 1932
- Genus: Agdistopis; Hampson, 1917

Type species
- Agdistopis sinhala (Fletcher, 1909)

Synonyms
- Macropiratis Meyrick, 1932

Family of moths

Macropiratidae is a family of moths which has sometimes been treated as a subfamily of the Pterophoridae, owing to the resemblance between specimens of Macropiratidae and plume moths of the genus Agdistis, at least when preserved as pinned specimens. The family contains a single genus Agdistopis with three species.

Thomas Bainbrigge Fletcher described the species now known as Agdistopis sinhala from a single specimen in poor condition, collected in Sri Lanka in December 1907.

In 1917, George Hampson published a description of a new genus Agdistopis and a new species, Agdistopis petrochroa. His description was based on five specimens collected in Taiwan, Sri Lanka and Singapore. A. petrochroa was subsequently synonymised with A. sinhala. Hampson considered these moths to belong to the Pyralidae, but noted the remarkable superficial resemblance to Agdistis.

In 1932, Edward Meyrick described two species and assigned them both to a new genus (Macropiratis) and a new family, Macropiratidae. The first of these, now known as Agdistopis halieutica was recorded from Fiji, while the second (under the name Macropiratis heteromantis) was described from Sri Lanka and is now considered to be another redescription of A. sinhala. Subsequently, these moths (including A. griveaudi, described in 1982 from Madagascar) have been considered closely related to the plume moths, either as a subfamily Macropiratinae, or more recently as a full family in the superfamily Pterophoroidea. The posture of live moths and the appearance of caterpillars is markedly dissimilar from Agdistis or any other Pterophoridae.

Based on a major molecular phylogeny of the Lepidoptera including A. sinhala published in 2013, the family appears to be more closely related either to Hyblaeidae or Copromorphidae than to Pterophoridae. Subsequent studies have reinforced the separation of Macropiratidae from Pterophoridae and placement with Alucitoidea, Carposinoidea, Epermenioidea and Hyblaeoidea.

== Species ==
- Agdistopis halieutica (Meyrick, 1932) (found from Fiji, west to New Guinea and Australia)
- Agdistopis sinhala (T.B. Fletcher, 1909) (Asia)
- Agdistopis griveaudi Gibeaux, 1982 (Madagascar)
