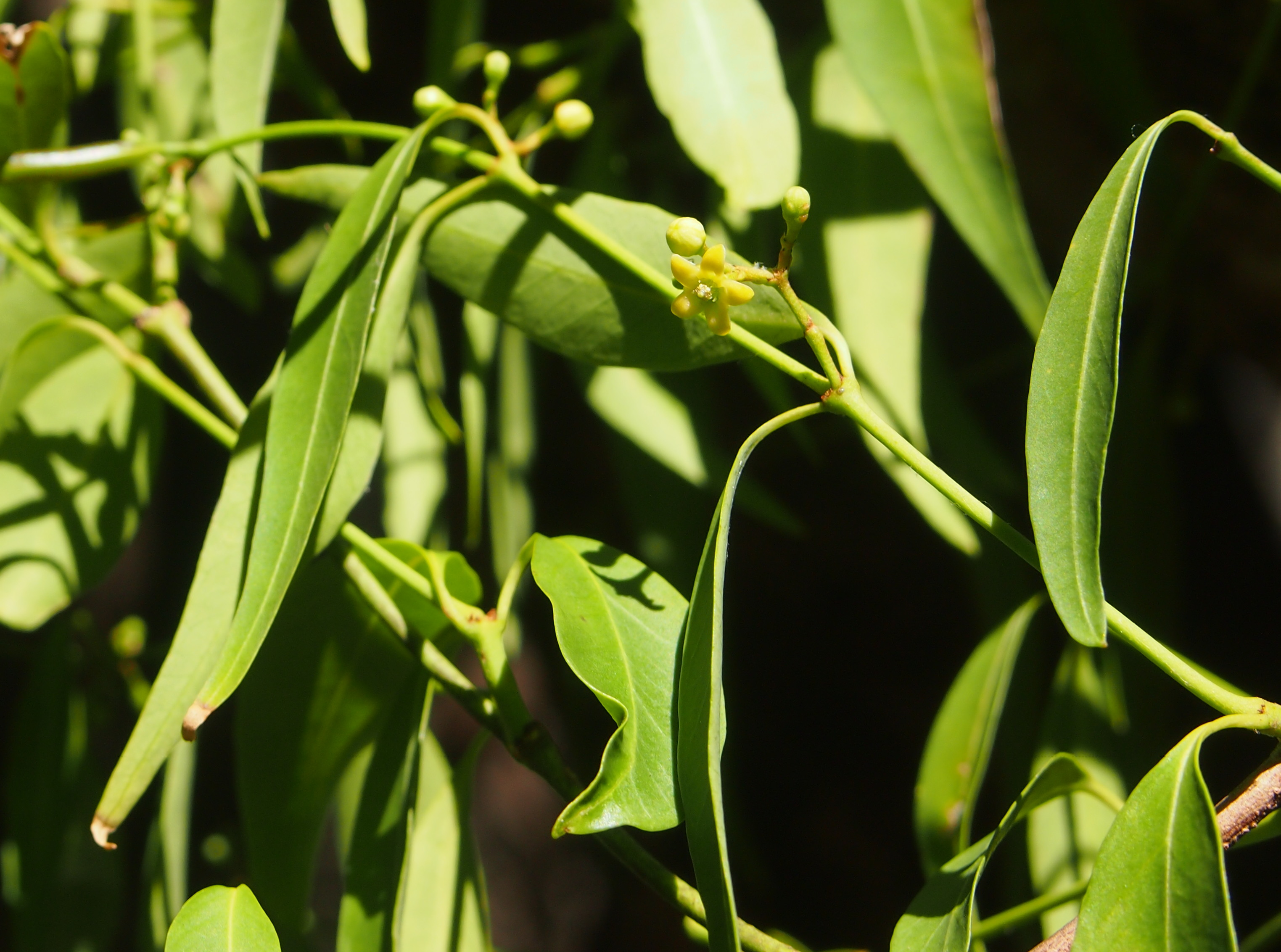
- Secamone elliptica

Scientific classification
- Kingdom: Plantae
- Clade: Tracheophytes
- Clade: Angiosperms
- Clade: Eudicots
- Clade: Asterids
- Order: Gentianales
- Family: Apocynaceae
- Subfamily: Secamonoideae
- Genus: Secamone; R.Br. 1810

Synonyms
- Genianthus Hook.f.; Rhynchostigma Benth.

= Secamone =

Genus of plants

Secamone is a genus of plant in family Apocynaceae, first described as a genus in 1810. It is widespread across much of Africa, northern Australia, southern Asia, with numerous species endemic to Madagascar.

== Species ==
150 species are accepted.

1. Secamone africana (Oliv.) Bullock – C Africa
2. Secamone afzelii (Roem. & Schult.) K.Schum. – W + C Africa
3. Secamone alba Jum. & H.Perrier – Madagascar
4. Secamone alpini Schult. – S + E Africa
5. Secamone andamanica Goel & Vasudeva Rao – Andaman Islands
6. Secamone angustifolioides Choux – Madagascar
7. Secamone ankarensis (Jum. & H.Perrier) Klack. – Madagascar
8. Secamone astephana Choux – Madagascar
9. Secamone attenuifolia Goyder – Tanzania
10. Secamone aurantiaca (C.Y.Wu) Rodda & Klack. – Bhutan to China (Yunnan)
11. Secamone auriculata Blume – western Jawa, Borneo, northern Queensland (Moa Islands).
12. Secamone australis Klack. – Madagascar
13. Secamone axillaris Klack. – Sulawesi
14. Secamone badia Klack. – Borneo (Sarawak)
15. Secamone bemarahensis Klack. – Madagascar
16. Secamone betamponensis Choux – Madagascar
17. Secamone bicolor Decne. – Madagascar
18. Secamone bicoronata (Klack.) Rodda & Klack. – China (southern Yunnan), Myanmar, and Thailand
19. Secamone bifida Klack. – Madagascar
20. Secamone blumei Decne. – Borneo, Java, the Philippines, and Sulawesi
21. Secamone bosseri Klack. – Madagascar
22. Secamone brachystigma Jum. & H.Perrier – Madagascar
23. Secamone brevicoronata Klack. – Madagascar
24. Secamone brevipes (Benth.) Klack. – C Africa
25. Secamone buxifolia Decne. – Madagascar
26. Secamone capitata Klack. – Madagascar
27. Secamone castanea Klack. – Madagascar
28. Secamone celebica Klack. – Sulawesi
29. Secamone chouxii Klack. – Madagascar
30. Secamone clavistyla T.Harris & Goyder – southern Tanzania (Rondo Plateau)
31. Secamone cloiselii Choux – Madagascar
32. Secamone coronata Klack. – Borneo (eastern Kalimantan)
33. Secamone crassifolia (Wight) K.Schum. – Peninsular Malaysia
34. Secamone cristata Jum. & H.Perrier – Madagascar
35. Secamone cuneifolia Bruyns – Socotra
36. Secamone curtisii (King & Gamble) Black.
37. Secamone delagoensis Schltr. – Mozambique, KwaZulu-Natal
38. Secamone dequairei Klack. – Madagascar
39. Secamone dewevrei De Wild. – C Africa
40. Secamone dictyoneura Klack. – Madagascar
41. Secamone dilapidans F.Friedmann – Réunion, Mauritius
42. Secamone discolor K.Schum. & Vatke – Madagascar
43. Secamone dolichorhachys K.Schum. – Madagascar
44. Secamone drepanoloba Klack. – Madagascar
45. Secamone ecoronata Klack. – Madagascar
46. Secamone elegans Klack. – Madagascar
47. Secamone elliottii K.Schum. – Madagascar
48. Secamone elliptica R.Br. – China, SE Asia, Queensland
49. Secamone emetica (Retz.) R.Br. ex Sm. – India
50. Secamone erythradenia K.Schum. – C Africa
51. Secamone falcata Klack. – Madagascar
52. Secamone filiformis (L.f.) J.H.Ross – Madagascar, Limpopo
53. Secamone furcata Klack. – Madagascar
54. Secamone galinae Klack. – Madagascar
55. Secamone geayi Costantin & Gallaud – Madagascar
56. Secamone gerrardii Harv. ex Benth. & Hook.f. – South Africa
57. Secamone glaberrima K.Schum. – Madagascar
58. Secamone glabra Klack. – Madagascar
59. Secamone glabrescens (M.R.Hend.) Klack. – Peninsular Malaysia (Johore)
60. Secamone goyderi Klack. – Gabon
61. Secamone gracilis – Kenya
62. Secamone grandiflora Klack. – Madagascar
63. Secamone griffithii (Decne.) Klack. – Myanmar, Peninsular Malaysia, and Java
64. Secamone hastata (Klack.) Rodda & Klack. – Sikkim to China (Yunnan) and Thailand
65. Secamone horei (Vasudeva Rao) Rodda & Klack. – Nicobar Islands
66. Secamone humbertii Choux – Madagascar
67. Secamone incarnata (A.Kidyoo) Rodda & Klack. – southern Thailand
68. Secamone insularis Miq. – Java (Pulu Sangiang)
69. Secamone jongkindii Klack. – Madagascar
70. Secamone kjellbergii Klack. – Sulawesi
71. Secamone kunstleri Klack. – western Peninsular Malaysia
72. Secamone laevis Klack. – Madagascar
73. Secamone lagenifera (Kerr) Klack. – Thailand and Cambodia
74. Secamone lankawiensis (King & Gamble) Klack. – Peninsular Malaysia (Langkawi)
75. Secamone laurifolia (Hook.f.) K.Schum. – western India to Sikkim and Vietnam
76. Secamone laxa Klack. – Madagascar
77. Secamone lenticellata Klack. – Borneo (Sarawak)
78. Secamone leonensis (Scott Elliot) N.E.Br. – Sierra Leone
79. Secamone letouzeana (H.Huber) Klack. – Gabon
80. Secamone ligustrifolia Decne. – Madagascar
81. Secamone linearifolia Klack. – Madagascar
82. Secamone linearis Klack. – Madagascar
83. Secamone lineata Blume – western Jawa, Bismarck Archipelago, and northern Queensland
84. Secamone longituba Klack. – Borneo (eastern Kalimantan)
85. Secamone macrophylla Blume – western Java
86. Secamone maingayi (Hook.f.) Rodda – Peninsular Malaysia, northern Sumatra, and western Borneo
87. Secamone maritima Blume – Java, Borneo, the Philippines, and Palau
88. Secamone marsupiata Klack. – Madagascar
89. Secamone minutiflora Tsiang – southern China
90. Secamone minutifolia Choux – Madagascar
91. Secamone nervosa – Madagascar
92. Secamone oblanceolata (Kerr) Rodda & Klack. – Thailand
93. Secamone obovata Decne. – Madagascar
94. Secamone oleifolia Decne. – Madagascar
95. Secamone ovatifolia Rodda & Klack. – Thailand
96. Secamone pachyphylla – Madagascar
97. Secamone pachystigma – Madagascar
98. Secamone parviflora – SE + S Africa
99. Secamone pedicellaris – Madagascar
100. Secamone penangiana (King & Gamble) Klack. – Peninsular Malaysia (Penang)
101. Secamone perrieri Choux – Madagascar
102. Secamone pinnata Choux – Madagascar
103. Secamone polyantha Choux – Madagascar
104. Secamone pulchra Klack. – Madagascar
105. Secamone punctulata Decne. – Tanzania, Burundi, Uganda
106. Secamone racemosa (Benth.) Klack. – C + EC Africa
107. Secamone rectinervis Schltr. – Philippines
108. Secamone reticulata Klack. – Madagascar
109. Secamone retusa N.E.Br. – Tanzania, Kenya
110. Secamone rhopalophora (Backer) Klack. – western Java
111. Secamone ridleyi (King & Gamble) Rodda & Klack. – northern Peninsular Malaysia (Taiping Hill)
112. Secamone rodriguesiana F.Friedmann – Rodrigues Island in Indian Ocean
113. Secamone rubra Klack. – Madagascar
114. Secamone rufovelutina (King & Gamble) Rodda & Klack. – Peninsular Malaysia
115. Secamone schatzii – Madagascar
116. Secamone schimperiana – Seychelles
117. Secamone schinziana – Madagascar
118. Secamone schweinfurthii K.Schum. – Ethiopia to South Africa
119. Secamone scortechinii (King & Gamble) Klack. – Peninsular Malaysia (Perak)
120. Secamone siamensis (Schltr.) Klack. – Thailand and Cambodia
121. Secamone socotrana Balf.f. – Socotra
122. Secamone sparsiflora Klack. – Madagascar
123. Secamone spirei (Costantin) Klack. – Thailand, Laos, and Vietnam
124. Secamone stuhlmannii K.Schum. – Tanzania, Zaire, Ethiopia
125. Secamone subpeltata (Klack.) Rodda & Klack. – Peninsular Malaysia (Fraser's Hill)
126. Secamone sulfurea (Jum. & H.Perrier) Klack. – Madagascar
127. Secamone sumatrana Klack. – western Sumatra
128. Secamone supranervis Klack. – Madagascar
129. Secamone tenuifolia Decne. – Madagascar
130. Secamone thailandica Rodda & Klack. – southwestern Thailand
131. Secamone thouarsii Decne. – Madagascar
132. Secamone timorensis Decne. – Lesser Sunda Islands, New Guinea, and northern Western Australia
133. Secamone toxocarpoides Choux – Madagascar
134. Secamone trichostemon Klack. – Madagascar
135. Secamone triflora Klack. – Madagascar
136. Secamone trullata (Klack.) Rodda & Klack. – northern Sumatra
137. Secamone truncatiloba Rodda & Klack. – Borneo (Kalimantan)
138. Secamone tsingycola Klack. – Madagascar
139. Secamone tuberculata Klack. – Madagascar
140. Secamone unciformis Klack. – Madagascar
141. Secamone uncinata Choux – Madagascar
142. Secamone uniflora Decne. – Madagascar
143. Secamone urceolata Klack. – Madagascar
144. Secamone urdanetensis Elmer ex Tsiang – Philippines (Mindanao)
145. Secamone valvata Klack. – Madagascar
146. Secamone varia Klack. – Madagascar
147. Secamone variicolor Klack. – Sulawesi
148. Secamone venosa Klack. – Madagascar
149. Secamone vietnamensis Rodda & Klack. – Vietnam
150. Secamone volubilis (Lam.) Marais – Réunion, Mauritius

formerly included

moved to other genera (Metastelma and Toxocarpus)

1. S. occidentalis now Metastelma occidentale
2. S. villosa now Toxocarpus villosus
3. S. wightiana now Toxocarpus wightianus
