= Agdistopis griveaudi =

Scientific classification
- Kingdom: Animalia
- Phylum: Arthropoda
- Clade: Pancrustacea
- Class: Insecta
- Order: Lepidoptera
- Family: Macropiratidae
- Genus: Agdistopis
- Species: A. griveaudi

Binomial name
- Agdistopis griveaudi Gibeaux, 1994

Species of moth

Agdistopis griveaudi is a moth in the Macropiratidae family. It is known from Madagascar.
