= Goniostemma =

Scientific classification
- Kingdom: Plantae
- Clade: Tracheophytes
- Clade: Angiosperms
- Clade: Eudicots
- Clade: Asterids
- Order: Gentianales
- Family: Apocynaceae
- Subfamily: Secamonoideae
- Genus: Goniostemma; Wight

Type species
- Goniostemma acuminata Wight

Genus of plants

Goniostemma is a genus of plant in family Apocynaceae, first described as a genus in 1834. It contains two known species, one native to China, the other to India and Bangladesh.

Species

1. Goniostemma acuminata Wight - India, Bangladesh
2. Goniostemma punctatum Tsiang & P.T. Li - Yunnan
