= Secamone schatzii =

Scientific classification
- Kingdom: Plantae
- Clade: Tracheophytes
- Clade: Angiosperms
- Clade: Eudicots
- Clade: Asterids
- Order: Gentianales
- Family: Apocynaceae
- Genus: Secamone
- Species: S. schatzii

Binomial name
- Secamone schatzii Klack.

Species of flowering plant

Secamone schatzii is a plant species endemic to Madagascar. It grows in lowland rainforest in the eastern part of the country. The species is named in honor of George Schatz of the Missouri Botanical Garden.

Secamone schatzii is a liana climbing as high as 20 m (66 ft). Stems are hairless, round in cross-section. Leaves are opposite, unlobed, elliptical, up to 6 cm (2.4 in) long. Flores are borne in short racemes in the axils of the leaves. Corolla is tubular, yellow-orange, up to 1.3 mm (0.051 in) long, hairy in the mouth but smooth and hairless on the lobes, thinning toward the margins.
