= Secamone socotrana =

Conservation status
- Least Concern (IUCN 3.1)

Scientific classification
- Kingdom: Plantae
- Clade: Tracheophytes
- Clade: Angiosperms
- Clade: Eudicots
- Clade: Asterids
- Order: Gentianales
- Family: Apocynaceae
- Genus: Secamone
- Species: S. socotrana

Binomial name
- Secamone socotrana Balf.f.

Species of plant

Secamone socotrana is a species of plant in the family Apocynaceae. It is endemic to the Socotra Islands in the Republic of Yemen. Its natural habitats are subtropical or tropical dry forests and subtropical or tropical dry shrubland.
