= Secamone cuneifolia =

Conservation status
- Vulnerable (IUCN 3.1)

Scientific classification
- Kingdom: Plantae
- Clade: Tracheophytes
- Clade: Angiosperms
- Clade: Eudicots
- Clade: Asterids
- Order: Gentianales
- Family: Apocynaceae
- Genus: Secamone
- Species: S. cuneifolia

Binomial name
- Secamone cuneifolia Bruyns

Species of plant

Secamone cuneifolia is a species of plant in the family Asclepiadaceae. It is endemic to Socotra. Its natural habitats are subtropical or tropical dry forests and subtropical or tropical dry shrubland.
