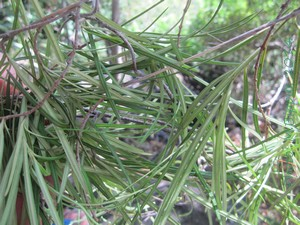

Scientific classification
- Kingdom: Plantae
- Clade: Tracheophytes
- Clade: Angiosperms
- Clade: Eudicots
- Clade: Asterids
- Order: Gentianales
- Family: Apocynaceae
- Genus: Secamone
- Species: S. volubilis

Binomial name
- Secamone volubilis (Lam.) Marais

Varieties
- Secamone volubilis var. salicifolia (Klack.) Bosser; Secamone volubilis var. volubilis

Synonyms
- Buddleja volubilis Lam.

= Secamone volubilis =

Species of plant

Secamone volubilis is a species of plant in the family Apocynaceae. It is native to the islands of Réunion and Mauritius in the Indian Ocean.

Two varieties are accepted.

- Secamone volubilis var. salicifolia (Klack.) Bosser (synonym S. salicifolia Klack.) – Mauritius
- Secamone volubilis var. volubilis (synonyms Ceropegia angustifolia Vahl ex Decne. and S. saligna Decne.) – Réunion
