= Agdistopis sinhala =

Scientific classification
- Kingdom: Animalia
- Phylum: Arthropoda
- Clade: Pancrustacea
- Class: Insecta
- Order: Lepidoptera
- Family: Macropiratidae
- Genus: Agdistopis
- Species: A. sinhala

Binomial name
- Agdistopis sinhala (T. B. Fletcher, 1909)

Synonyms
- Agdistis sinhala T.B. Fletcher, 1909; Agdistopis petrochroa Hampson, 1917; Macropiratis heteromantis Meyrick, 1932

Species of moth

Agdistopis sinhala is a moth of the family Macropiratidae. It is found in south-east Asia, including Sri Lanka, India, Japan and Taiwan.

The species was described under three different names during the early decades of the twentieth century, first by Thomas Bainbrigge Fletcher in 1909, as a member of the widely distributed plume moth genus Agdistis:

AGDISTIS SINHALA, n.s.

♂. Expanse 24 mm. Antennae ciliated (1), gray. Palpi densely scaled, gray, faintly irrorated with fuscous; projecting nearly length of head beyond it. Fore legs gray irrorated above with fuscous and with a conspicuous dilation at end of tibia. (Second pair of legs wanting.) Hind legs very long, light gray, spurs minute, first pair at about two-thirds, second pair apical. Head gray, with a faint fuscous median line. Thorax pale fuscous, with a sub-dorsal graying longitudinal line. Abdomen very long and slender, pale gray, darkening apically; a pale fuscous dorsal line on first three abdominal segments; anal tuft pale gray. Fore wing elongate, narrow, widening exteriorly, with a slightly falcate apex and distinct tornal angle; grayish fuscous; a dark fuscous bar along dorsum from base to about 1/3; outer third of wing (except costa) irrorated with dark fuscous and traversed by an oblique white streak most conspicuous in apex. Cilia grayish-fuscous. Hing wing triangular, apex acute, outer margin undulate with two very shallow excavations in normal positions of clefts; fuscous. Cilia fuscous, rather long in vicinity of anal angle.

Type ♂ (No. 6,900) in Coll. Bainbrigge Fletcher.

Locality. – A single specimen was taken at Kandy on December 22, 1907, by Mr. E. Ernest Green, to whose kind assistance in working at the Pterophoridae of Ceylon I am much indebted.

Observation. – Unfortunately this specimen is in poor condition, but I have carefully compared it with examples of eight Adgistid species in my collection and with the descriptions of all the other species described in this genus, and have no doubt of its distinctness.

In 1917, George Hampson described Agdistopis petrochroa, creating the new genus Agdistopis in recognition of the distinctive features of these moths. Hampson considered this moth to belong to the Pyralidae. In 1932, Edward Meyrick established the new family Macropiratidae, including Macropiratis heteromantis, now also considered a synonym for Fletcher's species:

Macropiratis heteromantis, n. sp.

♂. 30 mm. Differs from halieutica only as follows: face vertical; palpi moderate (1 1/2), scales tolerably pointed, terminal joint concealed; antennal ciliations over 1; forewings 2 from 2/3, costal half light brownish-ochreous, dorsal half and terminal area dark fuscous, whitish neural lines and oblique white apical streak as in halieutica; hindwings rather dark grey.

CEYLON, Kalutara, July (F. Mackwood); 1 ex. The singular differences, especially in the shape of head and development of palpi, between these two superficially very similar insects are apparently natural, but further material for investigation is very desirable.

The wingspan is 25–38 mm.
