= Goniostemma punctatum =

Conservation status
- Critically Endangered (IUCN 3.1)

Scientific classification
- Kingdom: Plantae
- Clade: Tracheophytes
- Clade: Angiosperms
- Clade: Eudicots
- Clade: Asterids
- Order: Gentianales
- Family: Apocynaceae
- Genus: Goniostemma
- Species: G. punctatum

Binomial name
- Goniostemma punctatum Tsiang & P.T.Li

Species of plant

Goniostemma punctatum is a species of flowering plant in the family Apocynaceae. It is a climbing shrub endemic to southern Yunnan Province of south-central China. It grows in montane forests.
