= Calyptranthera =

Scientific classification
- Kingdom: Plantae
- Clade: Tracheophytes
- Clade: Angiosperms
- Clade: Eudicots
- Clade: Asterids
- Order: Gentianales
- Family: Apocynaceae
- Subfamily: Secamonoideae
- Genus: Calyptranthera; Klack. 1996

Type species
- Toxocarpus caudiclavus Choux

Genus of flowering plants

Calyptranthera is a genus of plants in the family Apocynaceae, first described as a genus in 1996. The entire genus is endemic to Madagascar in the Indian Ocean.

Species

1. Calyptranthera baronii Klack.
2. Calyptranthera brevicaudata Klack.
3. Calyptranthera caudiclava (Choux) Klack.
4. Calyptranthera filifera Klack.
5. Calyptranthera gautieri Klack.
6. Calyptranthera grandiflora Klack.
7. Calyptranthera pubipetala Klack.
8. Calyptranthera schatziana Klack.
9. Calyptranthera sulphurea Klack.
10. Calyptranthera villosa Klack.
11. Calyptranthera viridiflava Ammann, L. Gaut. & Klack.
