= Pervillaea =

Scientific classification
- Kingdom: Plantae
- Clade: Tracheophytes
- Clade: Angiosperms
- Clade: Eudicots
- Clade: Asterids
- Order: Gentianales
- Family: Apocynaceae
- Subfamily: Secamonoideae
- Genus: Pervillaea; Decne. 1844

Synonyms
- Pervillea Klack. (spelling variation); Menabea Baill.

Genus of flowering plants

Pervillaea is a genus of plants in the family Apocynaceae, first described as a genus in 1844. It is native to Mauritius and Madagascar in the Indian Ocean.

Species

1. Pervillaea brevirostris Klack. - Mauritius
2. Pervillaea decaryi (Choux) Klack. - Madagascar
3. Pervillaea phillipsonii Klack. - Madagascar
4. Pervillaea tomentosa Decne. - Madagascar
5. Pervillaea venenata (Baill.) Klack. - Madagascar
