= Secamone racemosa =

Conservation status
- Vulnerable (IUCN 3.1)

Scientific classification
- Kingdom: Plantae
- Clade: Tracheophytes
- Clade: Angiosperms
- Clade: Eudicots
- Clade: Asterids
- Order: Gentianales
- Family: Apocynaceae
- Genus: Secamone
- Species: S. racemosa

Binomial name
- Secamone racemosa (Benth.) Klack

Synonyms
- Rhynchostigma racemosum Benth.

Species of plant

Secamone racemosa is a species of plant in the family Apocynaceae. It is found in Burundi, Cameroon, the Democratic Republic of the Congo, Equatorial Guinea, Rwanda, and Uganda. Its natural habitat is subtropical or tropical moist montane forests. It is threatened by habitat loss.
