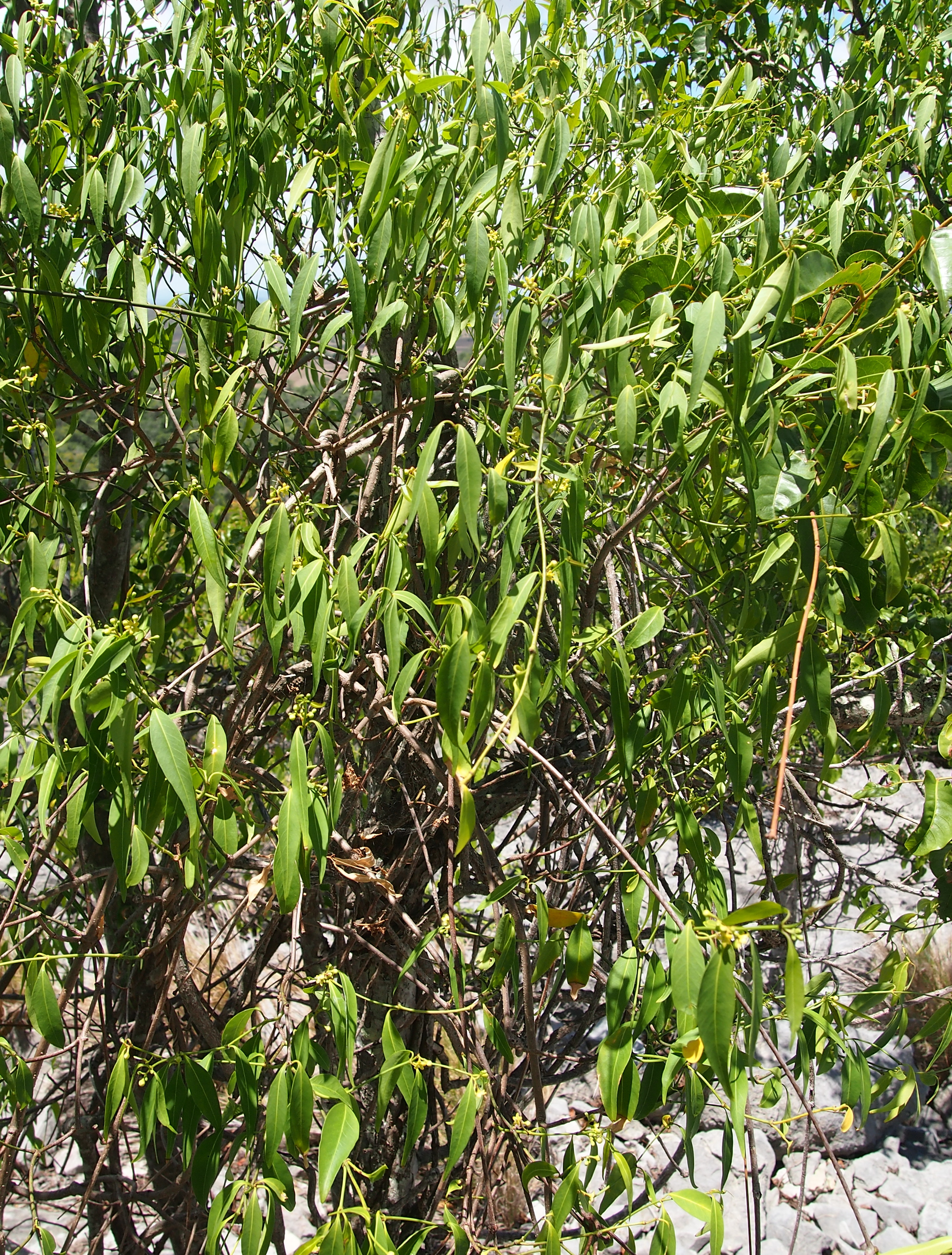

Scientific classification
- Kingdom: Plantae
- Clade: Tracheophytes
- Clade: Angiosperms
- Clade: Eudicots
- Clade: Asterids
- Order: Gentianales
- Family: Apocynaceae
- Genus: Secamone
- Species: S. elliptica

Binomial name
- Secamone elliptica R.Br.

= Secamone elliptica =

Species of plant

Secamone elliptica, also known as corky milk vine, cork vine and secamone, is a species of vines or lianas, of the plant family Apocynaceae. The range extends from southern China through much of Southeast Asia to Northern Australia, from The Kimberley, across The Top End and the East coast from Cape York to northern New South Wales. The natural habitat is monsoon forest, littoral rainforest and occasionally in more open forest types.

The species is characterised by opposite leaves and milky sap that exudes from broken stems and leaves. Small cream or yellow flowers are produced in spring and summer.

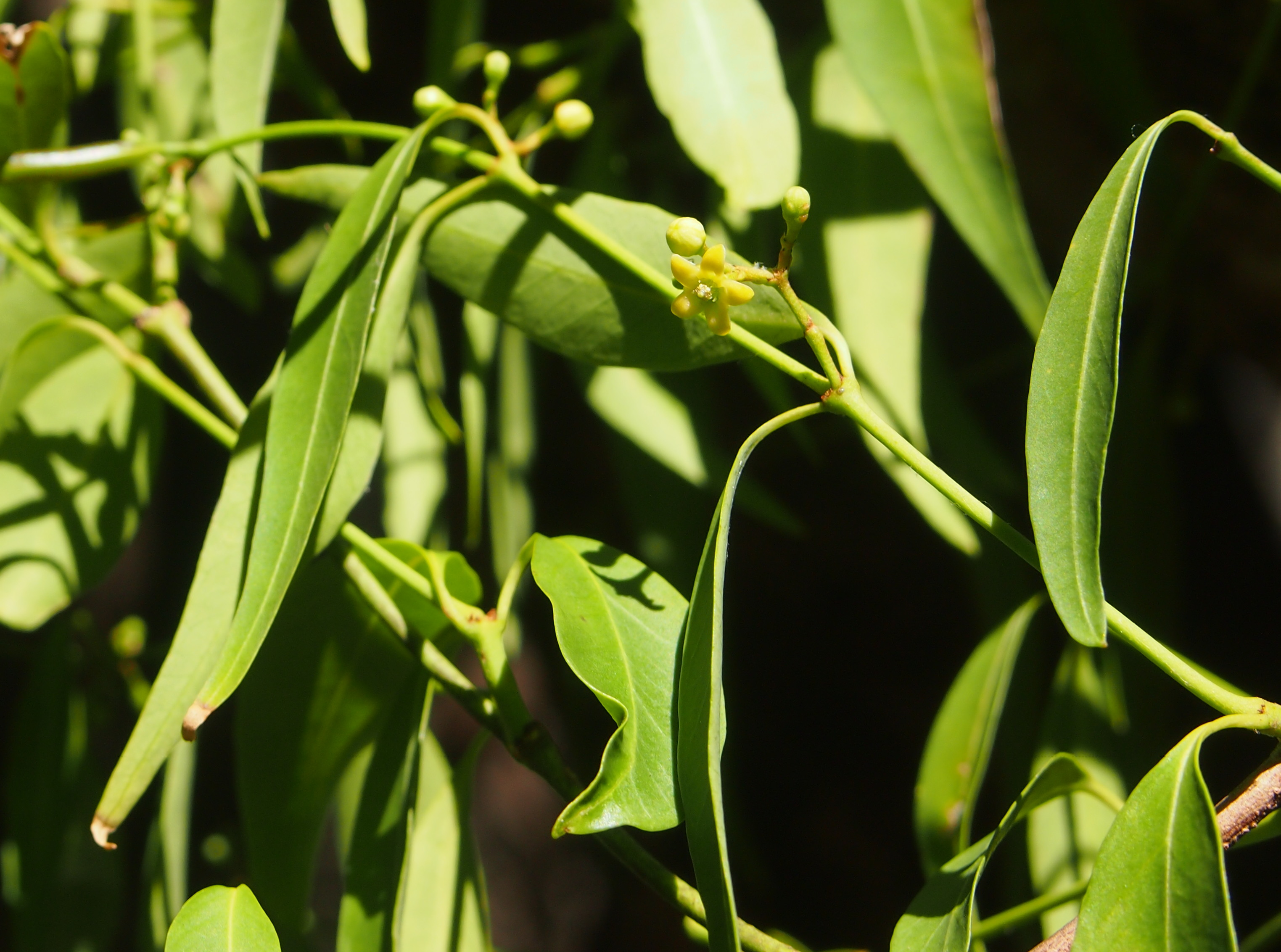
Flowers and foliage
