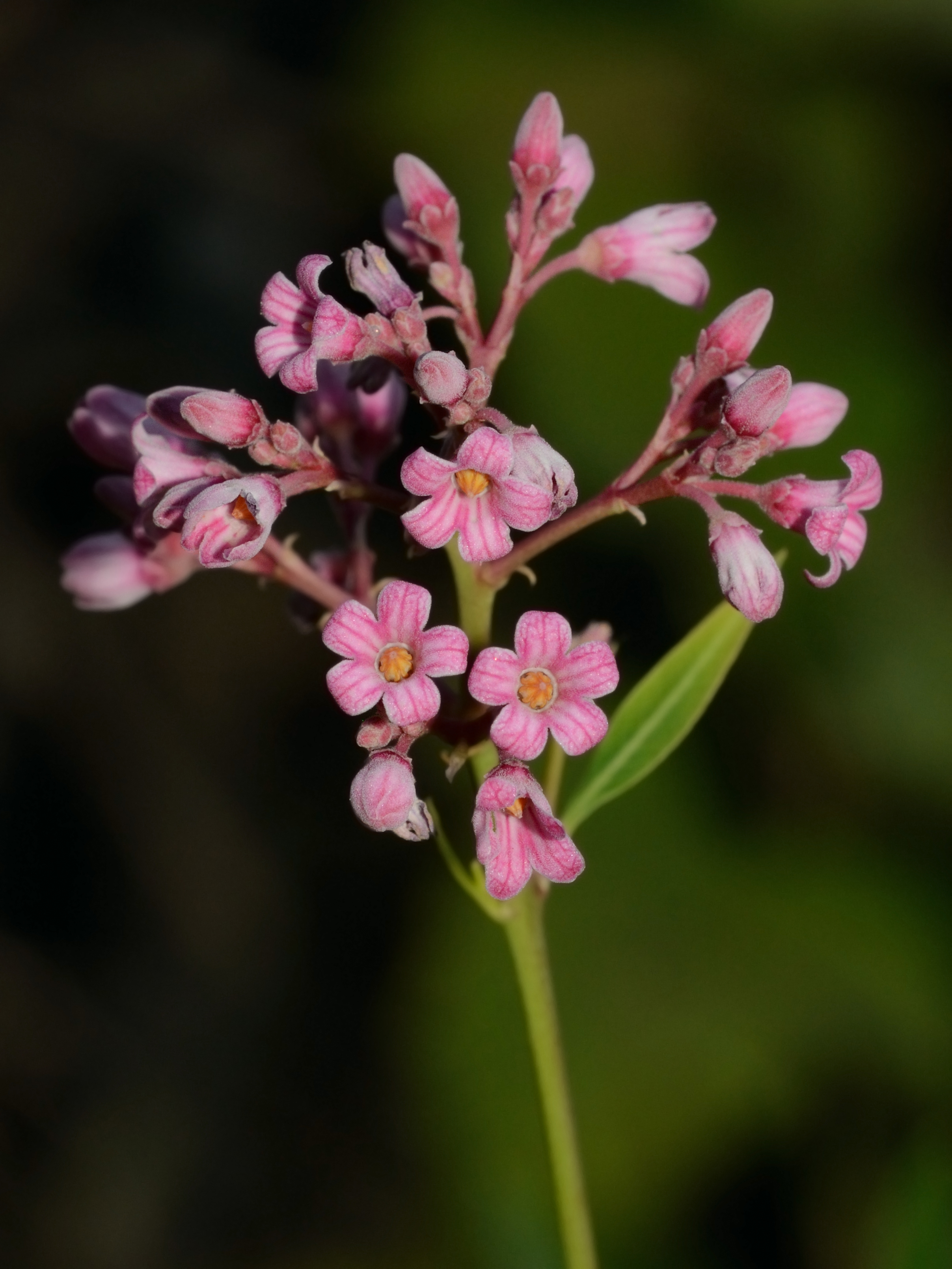
- Apocynum venetum

Scientific classification
- Kingdom: Plantae
- Clade: Tracheophytes
- Clade: Angiosperms
- Clade: Eudicots
- Clade: Asterids
- Order: Gentianales
- Family: Apocynaceae
- Subfamily: Apocynoideae; Burnett

Tribes
- Apocyneae; Echiteae; Baisseeae; Malouetieae; Mesechiteae; Wrightieae

= Apocynoideae =

Subfamily of flowering plants

Apocynoideae is a subfamily of the flowering plant family Apocynaceae (order Gentianales), also called the 'dogbane' or milkweed family, containing about 860 species across 78 genera. Several are of pharmacological interest; Strophanthus has furnished highly effective arrow poisons, due to their cardiac glycoside content. Apocynoideae also includes many popular landscaping and ornamental species, one of the best-known, and most infamous, being the oleander (Nerium oleander); the subfamily also contains remarkable pachycaul genera like Adenium and Pachypodium.

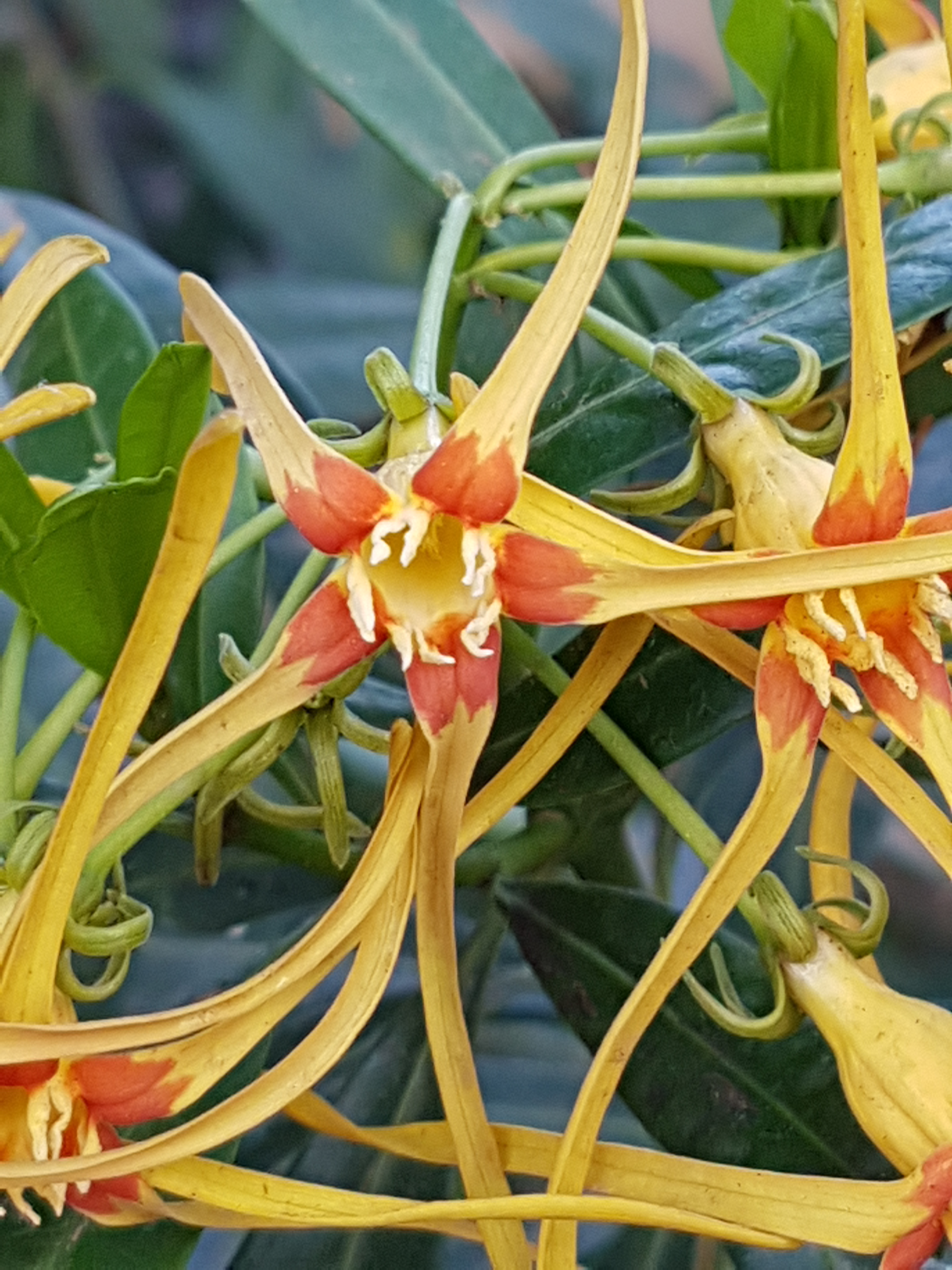
Strophanthus speciosus

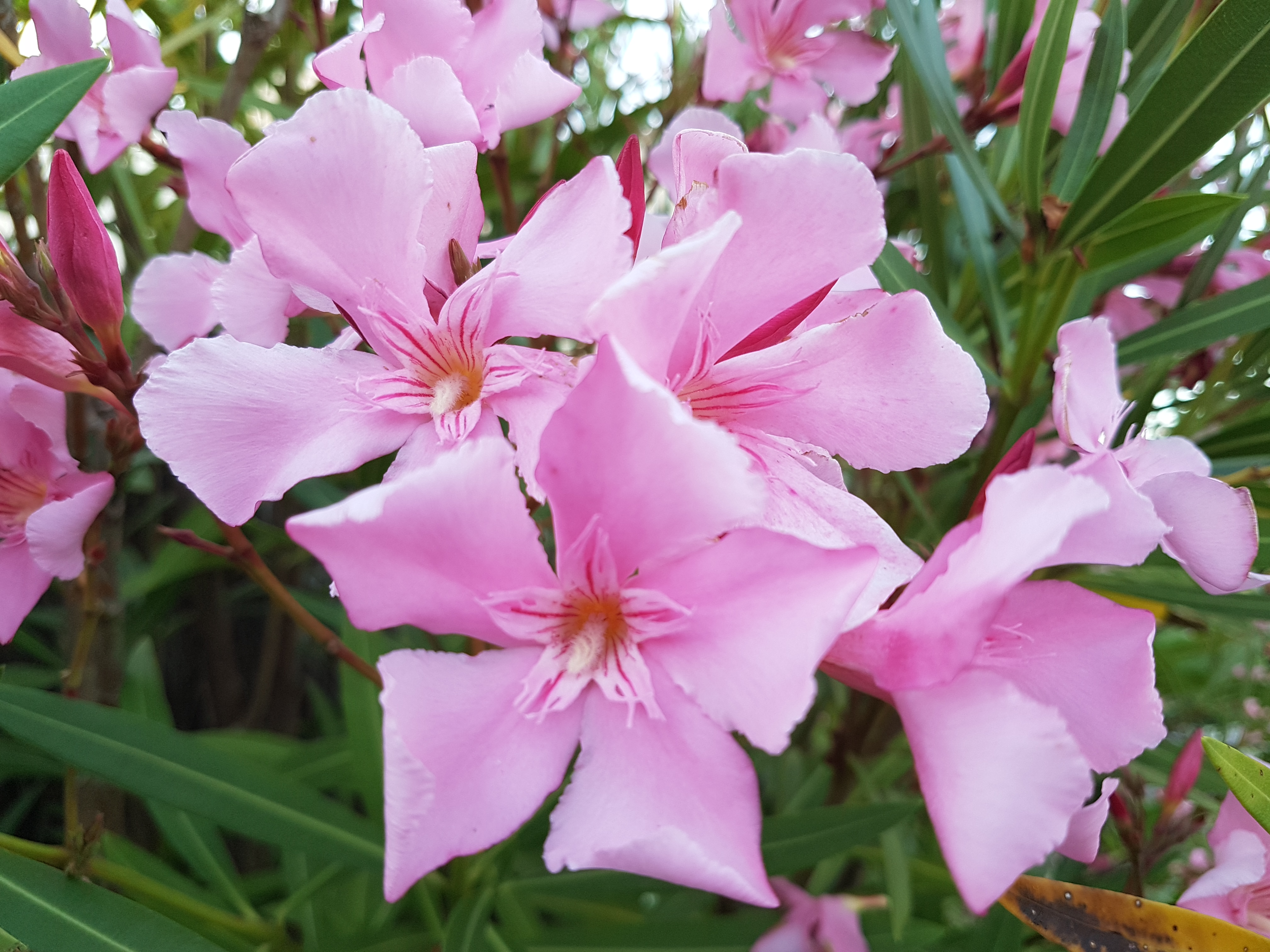
Nerium oleander

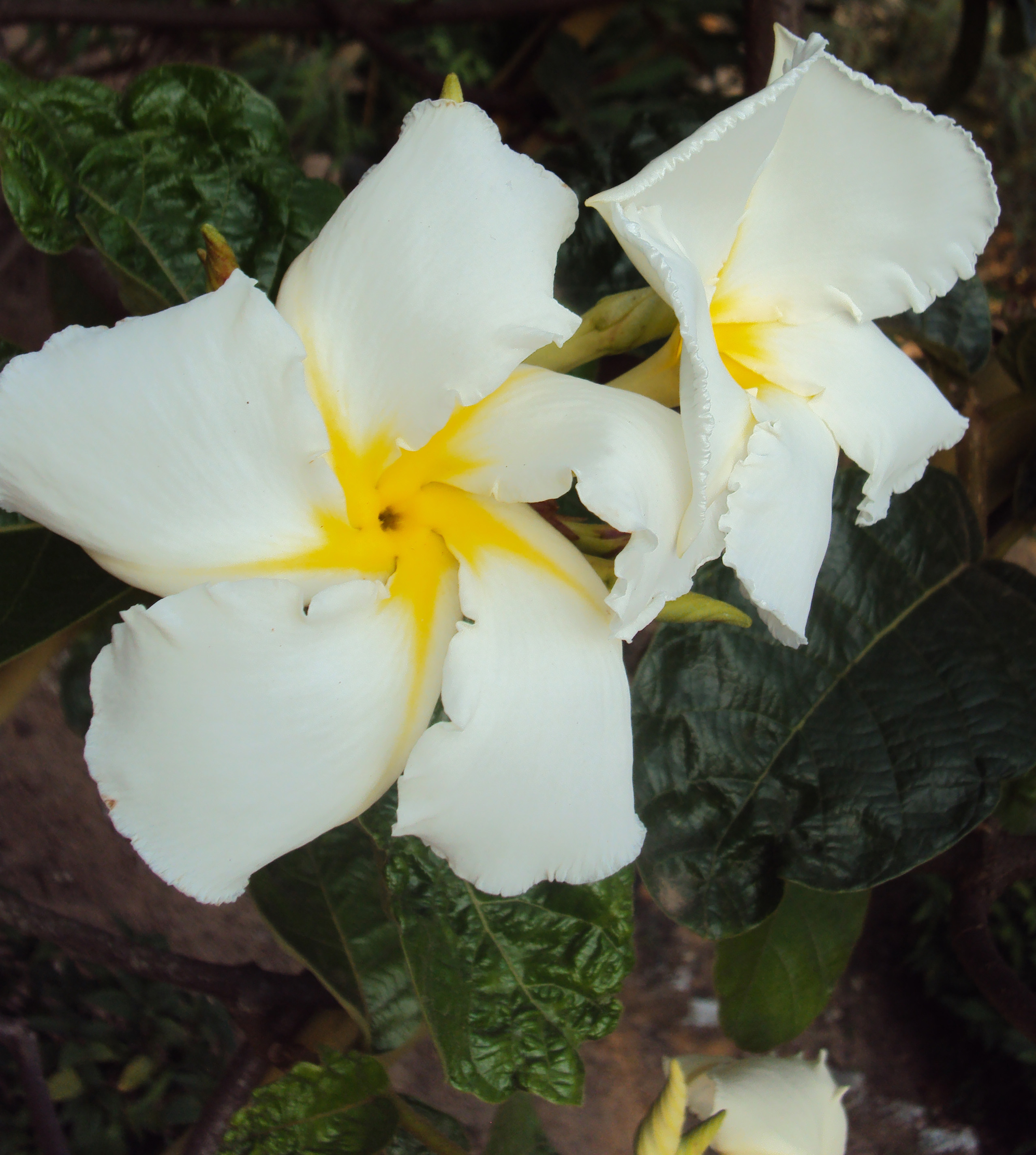
Chonemorpha fragrans

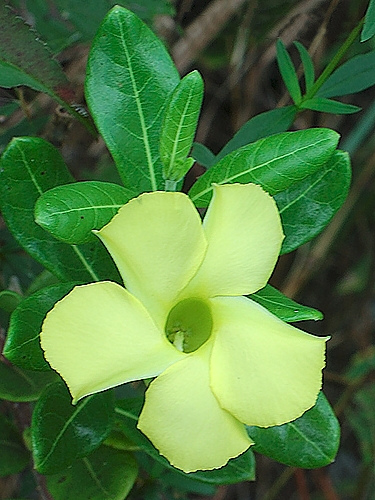
Pentalinon luteum

== Genera ==
Tribe Apocyneae (24 genera)

- Beaumontia Wall. (5 species) - Indomalayan
- Parepigynum Tsiang & P.T.Li - S China
- Vallaris Burm.f. - Indomalayan
- Anodendron A.DC. - Indomalayan, Oceanian
- Ixodonerium Pit. - Vietnam
- Papuechites Markgr. - Oceanian
- Amphineurion (A.DC.) Pichon - Indomalayan
- Sindechites Oliv. - S China, Indochina
- Streptoechites D.J. Middleton & Livsh. - S China, Indochina
- Apocynum L. - Holarctic
- Cleghornia Wight - Indomalayan
- Aganonerion Pierre ex Spire - Indochina
- Parameria Benth. - China, Indochina
- Urceola Roxb. - Indomalayan, Oceanian
- Chonemorpha G.Don - Indomalayan
- Trachelospermum Lem. - Indomalayan
- Vallariopsis Woodson - Malesia
- Aganosma (Blume) G.Don - Indomalayan
- Amalocalyx Pierre - S China, Indochina
- Baharuia D.J.Middleton - Malesia
- Epigynum Wight - Indomalayan
- Ichnocarpus R.Br. - Indomalayan
- Micrechites Miq. - Indomalayan, Oceanian
- Pottsia Hook. & Arn. - Indomalayan

Tribe Baisseeae (4 genera)

- Baissea A.DC. (18 species) - Afrotropical
- Dewevrella De Wild. - W Africa
- Motandra A.DC. - Afrotropical
- Oncinotis Benth. (7 species) - Afrotropical

Tribe Echiteae (23 genera)

- Angadenia Miers - Caribbean
- Pentalinon Voigt - Neotropical
- Salpinctes Woodson
- Asketanthera Woodson - Caribbean
- Macropharynx Rusby - S America
- Peltastes Woodson - S America
- Temnadenia Miers - S America
- Bahiella J.F.Morales - Brazil
- Echites P.Browne - Neotropical
- Fernaldia Woodson - C America
- Hylaea J.F.Morales - S America
- Laubertia A.DC. - Neotropical
- Prestonia R.Br. (63 species) - Neotropical
- Artia Guillaumin (5 species) - New Caledonia
- Ecua D.J.Middleton (1 species) - Indonesia
- Parsonsia R.Br. (120 species; could belong to Periplocoideae) - Indomalayan, Oceanian
- Thenardia Kunth (3 species) - C America
- Thoreauea J.K.Williams (3 species) - S Mexico

Tribe Malouetieae (13 genera)

- Allowoodsonia Markgr. (1 species) - Solomon Islands
- Carruthersia Seem. (4 species) - Philippines, Oceania
- Eucorymbia Stapf (1 species) - Sundaland
- Funtumia Stapf (2 species) - Afrotropical
- Galactophora Woodson (6 species) - S America
- Holarrhena R.Br. (5 species) - Indomalayan
- Kibatalia G.Don (15 species) - Indomalayan, Sulawesi
- Malouetia A.DC. (31 species) - Pantropical
- Mascarenhasia A.DC. (8 species) - Madagascar
- Neobracea Britton (8 species) - Caribbean
- Pachypodium Lindl. (18 to 25 species) - Afrotropical
- Spirolobium Baill. (1 species) - Sundaland

Tribe Mesechiteae (5 genera)

- Allomarkgrafia Woodson (9 species) - Neotropical
- Forsteronia G.Mey. (45 species) - Neotropical
- Mandevilla Lindl. (115 species) - Neotropical
- Mesechites Müll.Arg. (8 species) - Neotropical
- Tintinnabularia Woodson (3 species) - C America

Tribe Nerieae (6 genera)

- Adenium Roem. & Schult. (5 species) - Afrotropical
- Alafia Thouars (26 species) - Afrotropical
- Farquharia Stapf (1 species) - Afrotropical
- Isonema R.Br. (3 species) - W Africa
- Nerium L. (1 species) - Mediterranean
- Strophanthus DC. (39 species) - Paleotropical

Tribe Odontadenieae (7 genera)

- Cycladenia Benth. (1 species) - Southwestern North America
- Elytropus Müll.Arg. (1 species) - Chile, Argentina
- Odontadenia Benth. (20 species) - Neotropical
- Pinochia B.F.Hansen & M.E.Endress (4 species) - Neotropical
- Secondatia A.DC. (5 species) - Neotropical
- Stipecoma Müll.Arg. (1 species) - Bolivia, Brazil
- Thyrsanthella (Baill.) Pichon (1 species) - Eastern North America

Tribe Rhabdadenieae (1 genus)

- Rhabdadenia Müll.Arg. (3 species) - Nearctic

Tribe Wrightieae (3 genera)

- Pleioceras Baill. (5 species) - Afrotropical
- Stephanostema K.Schum. (1 species) - Tanzania
- Wrightia R.Br. (23 species) - Paleotropical

== Gallery ==
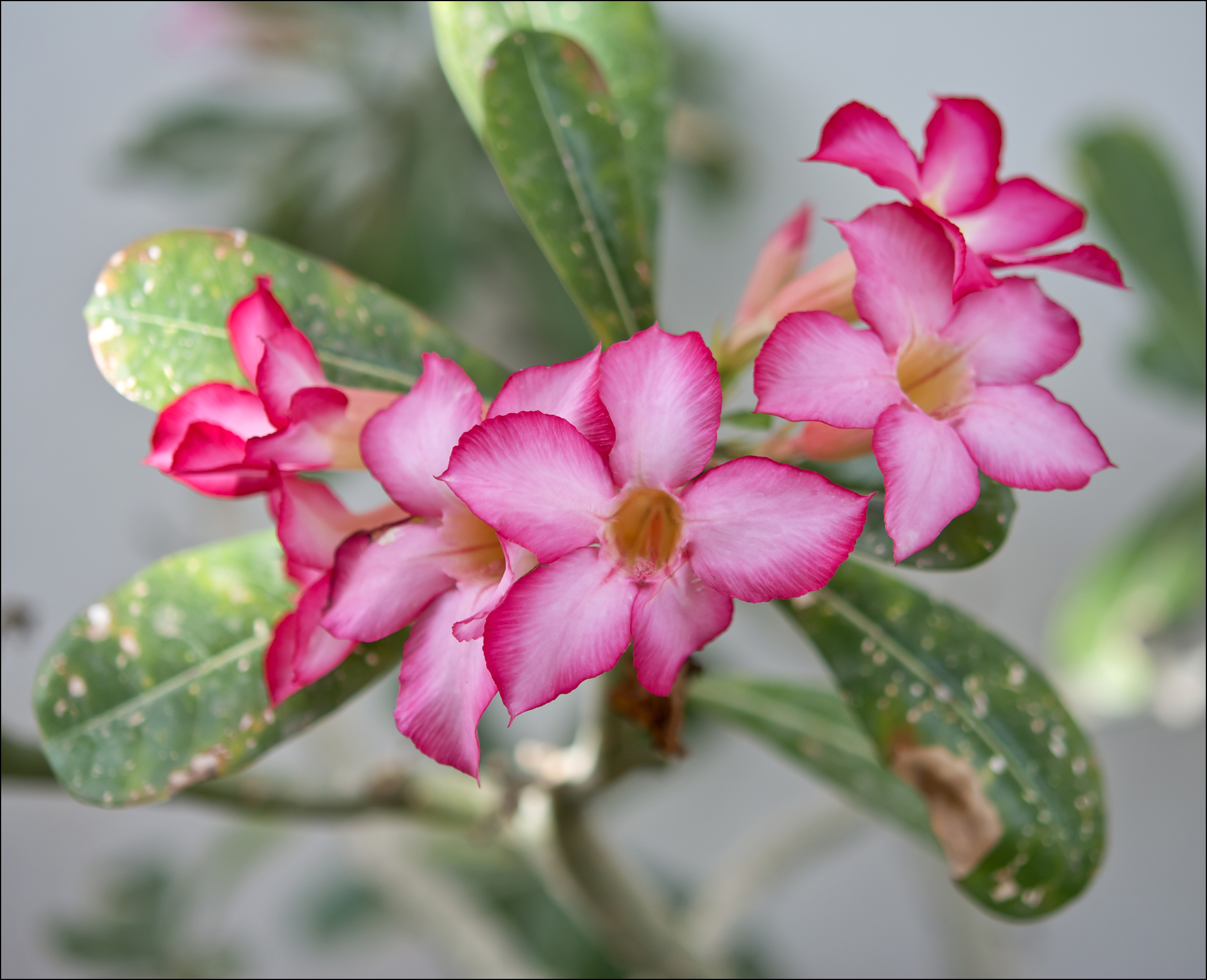
Adenium obesum

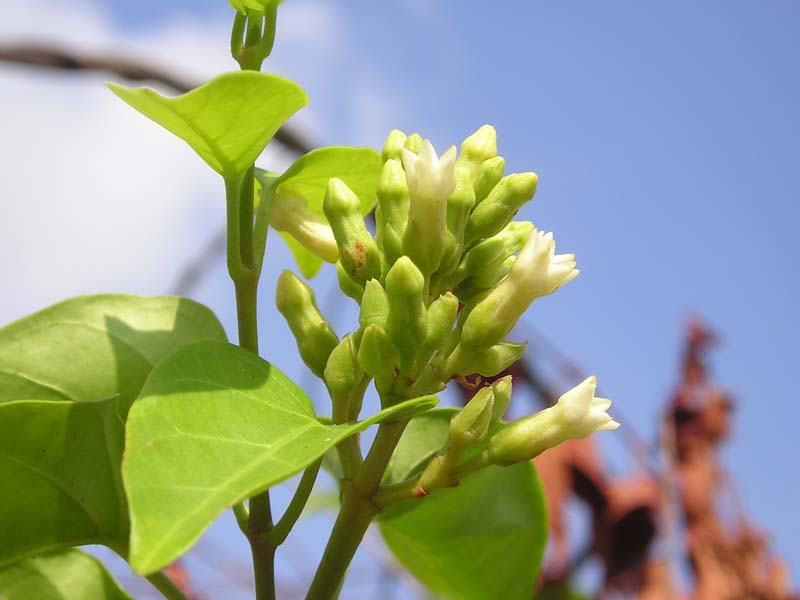
Urceola polymorpha

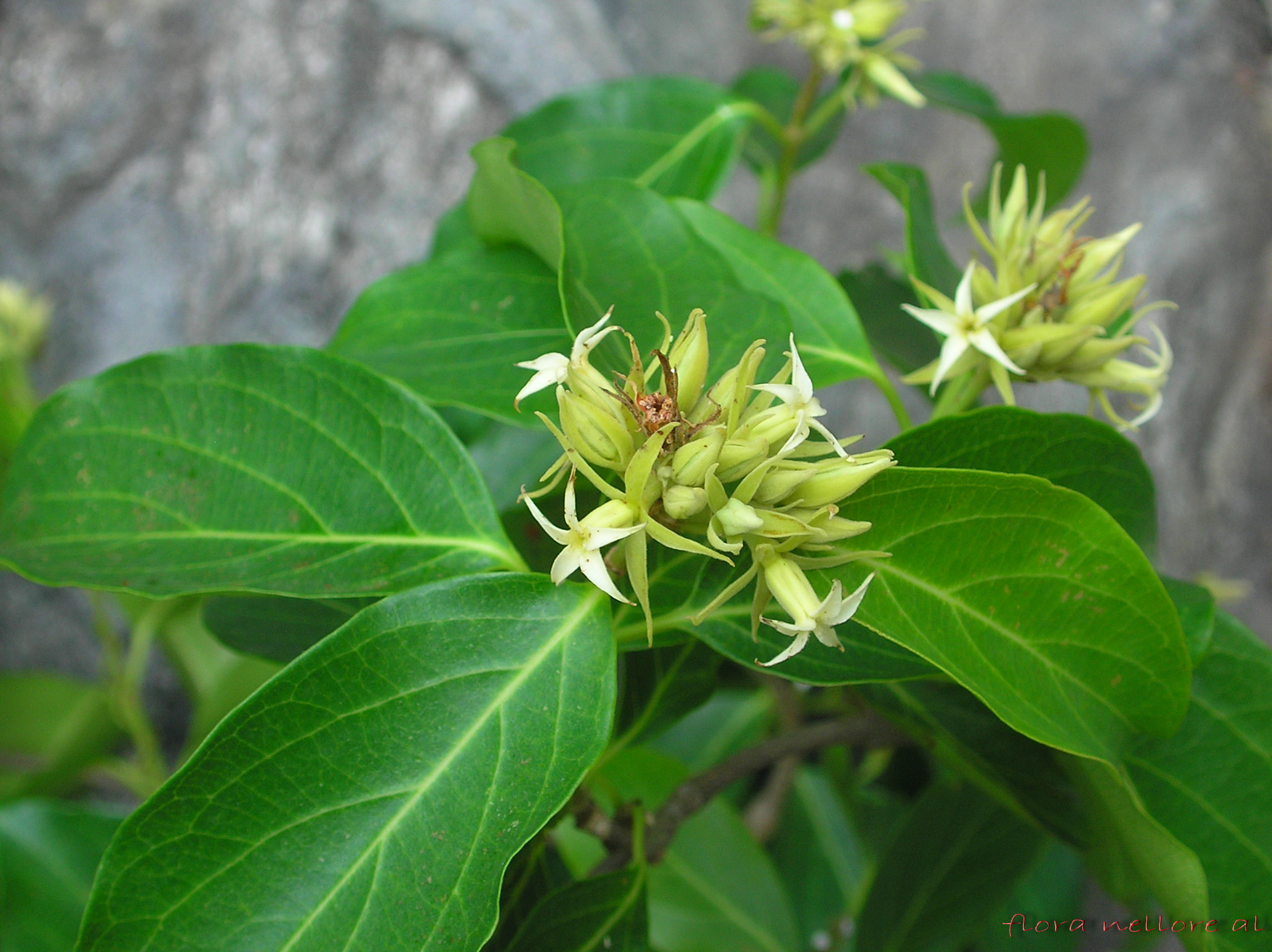
Aganosma cymosa

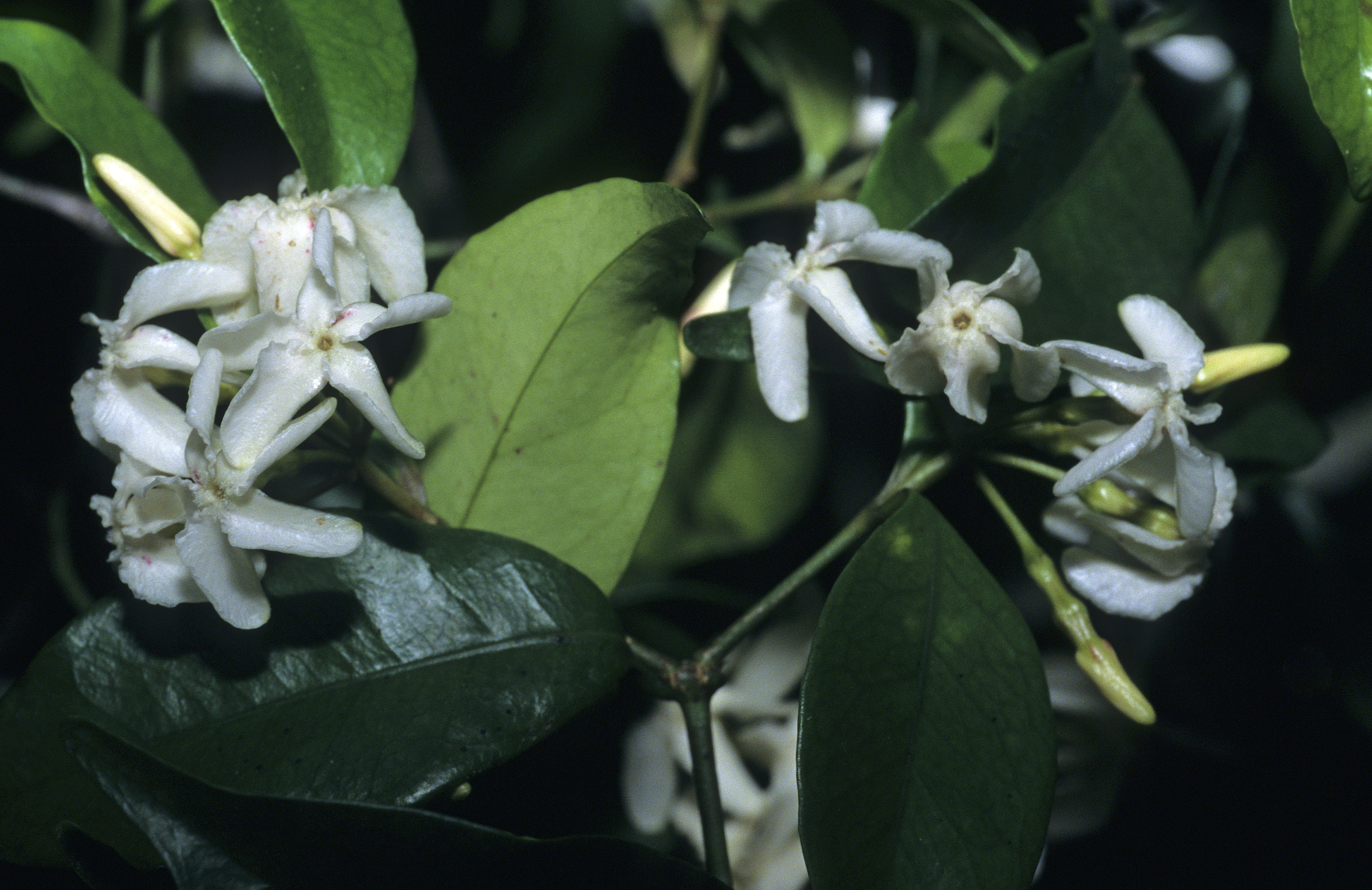
Alafia caudata subsp. latiloba

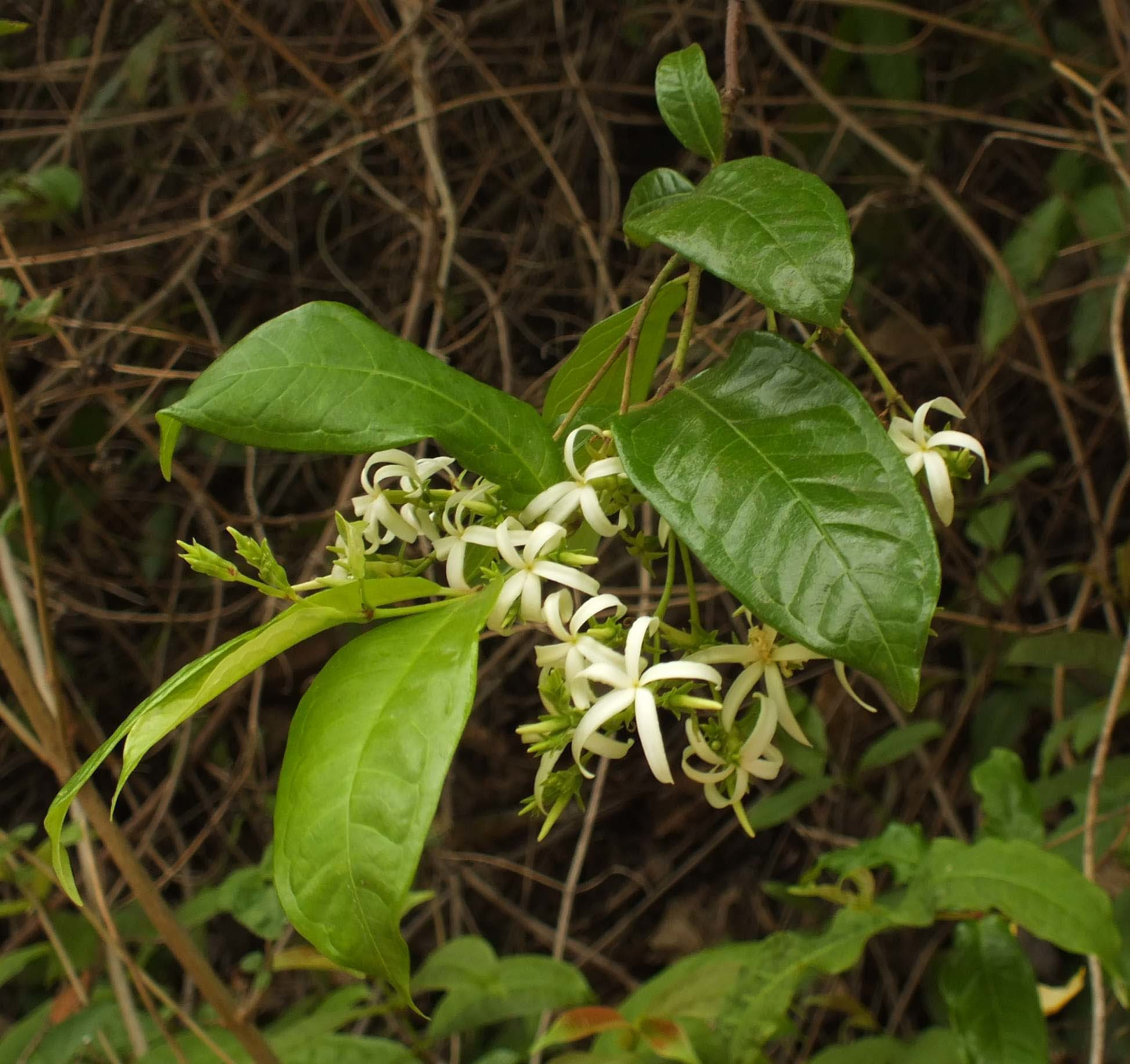
Amphineurion marginatum

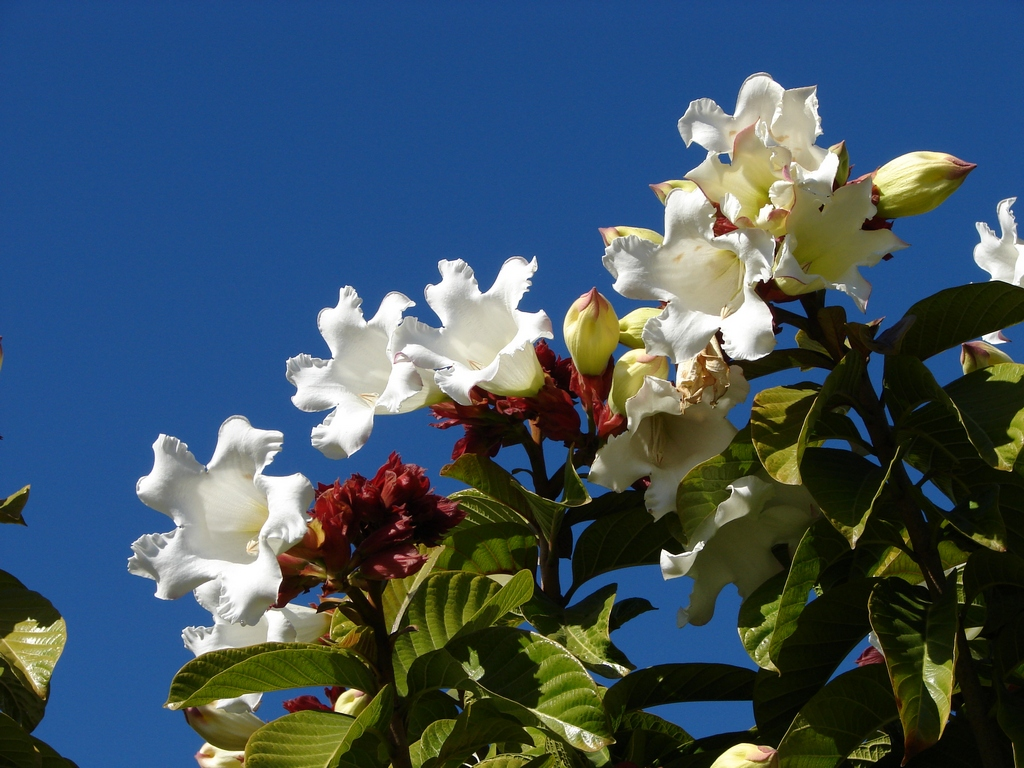
Beaumontia grandiflora

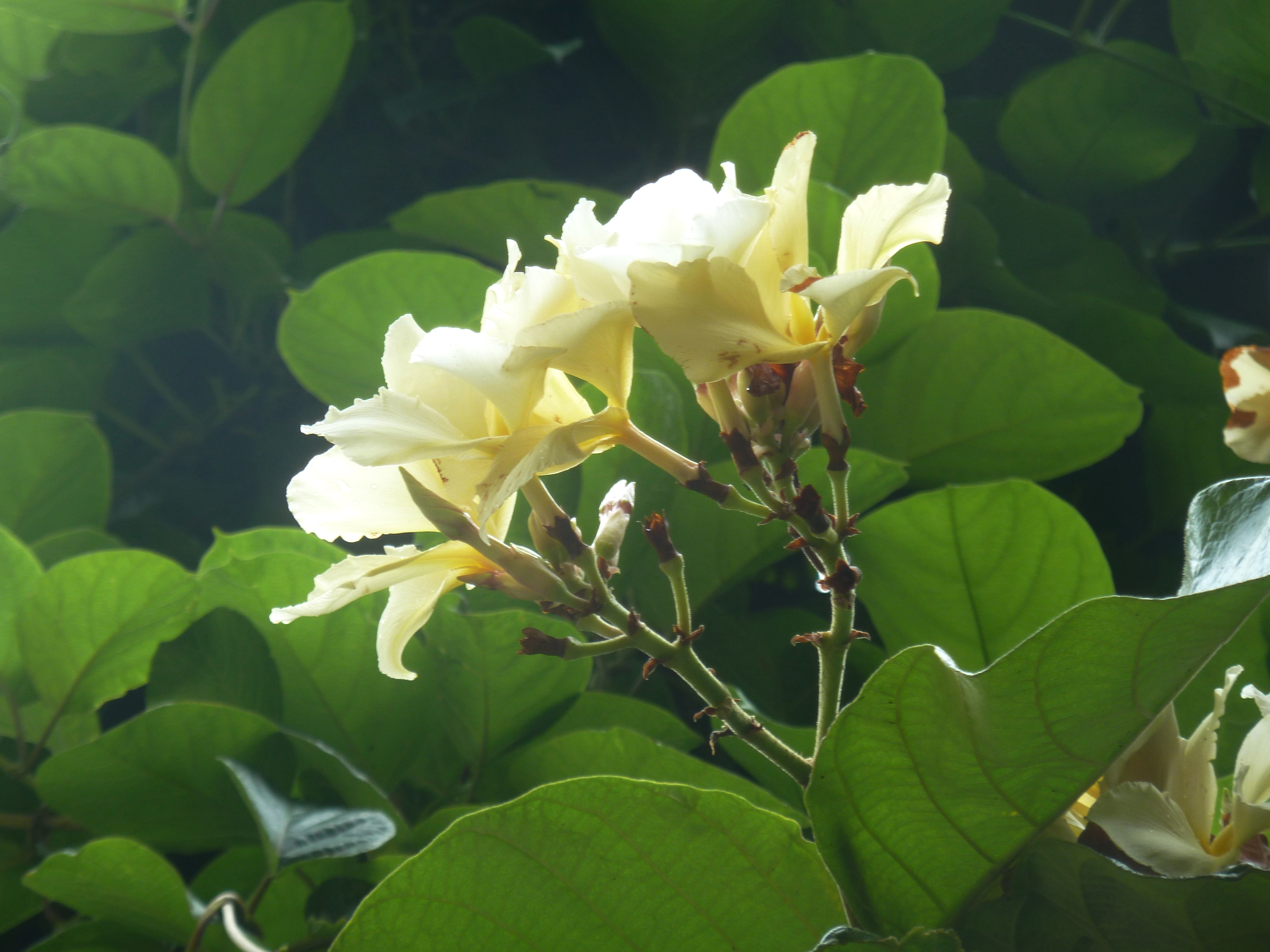
Chonemorpha fragrans side view of flowers

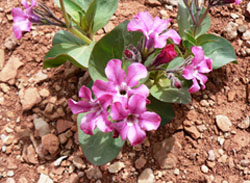
Cycladenia humilis var. jonesii

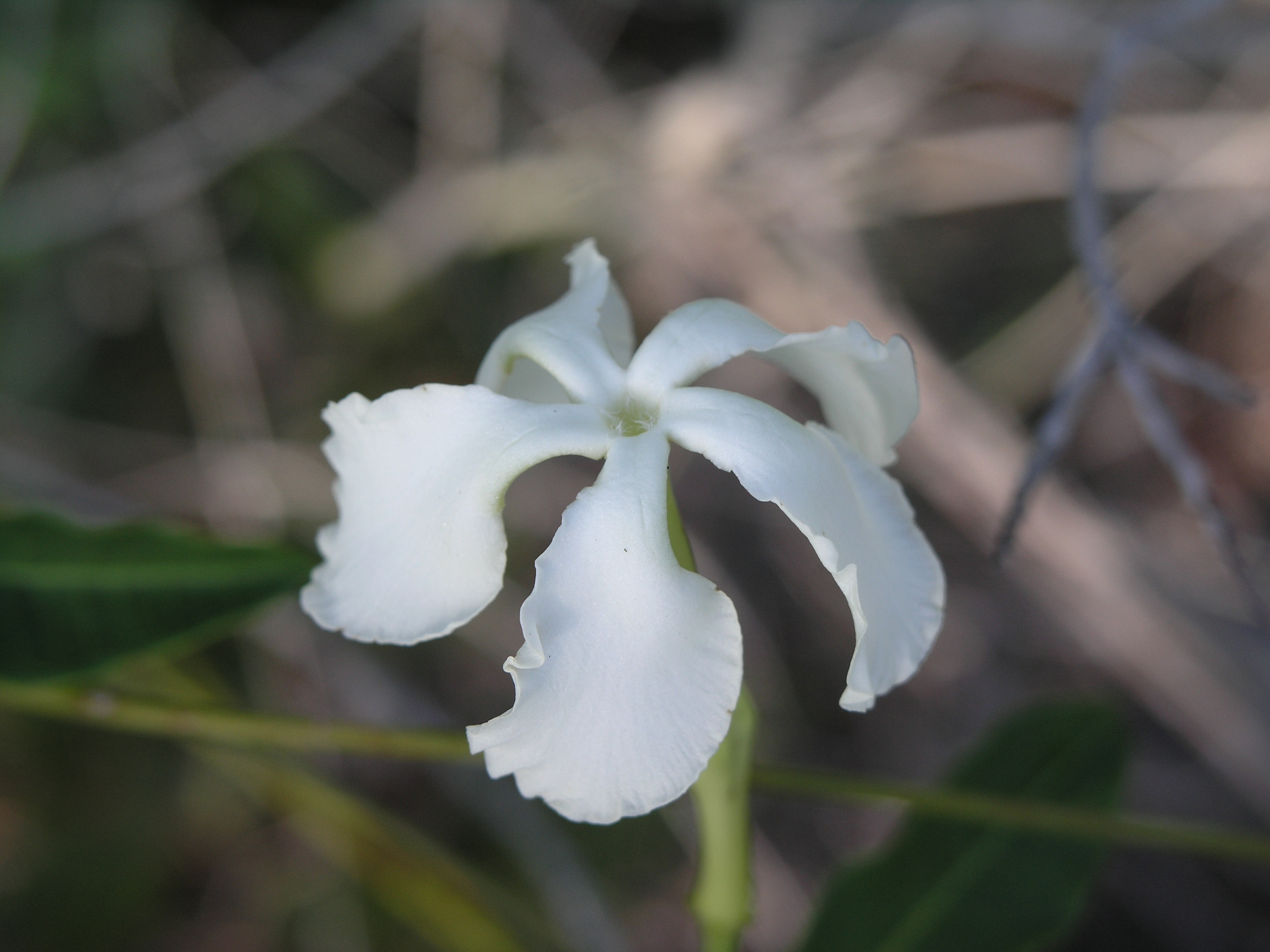
Echites umbellatus

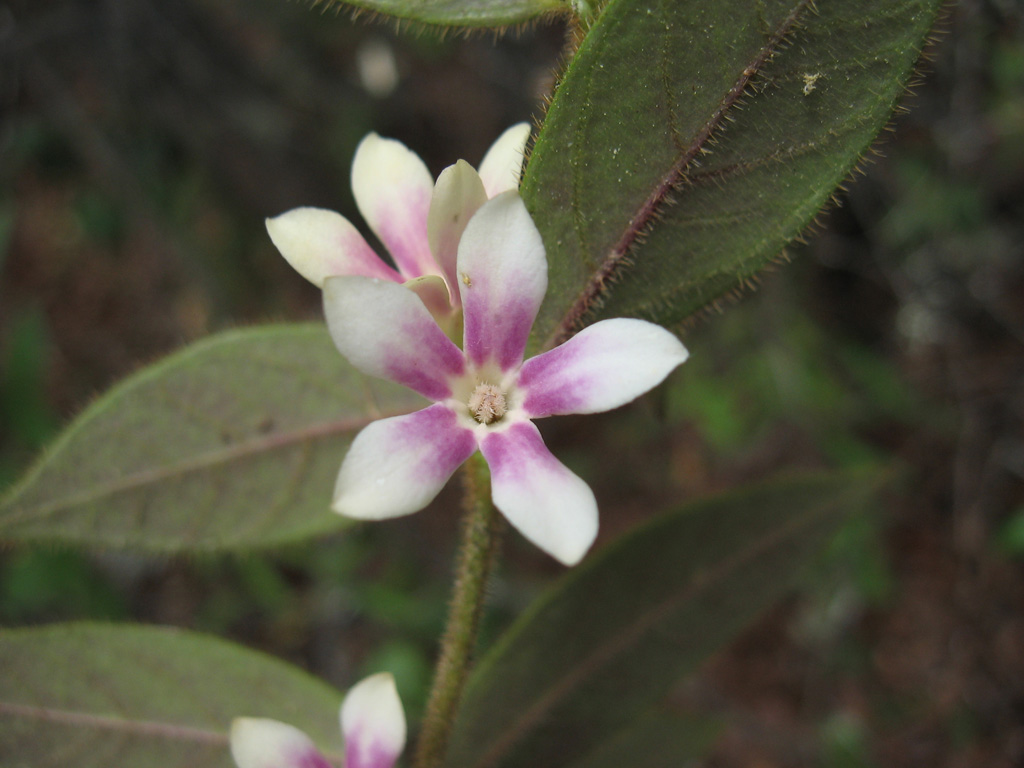
Elytropus chilensis

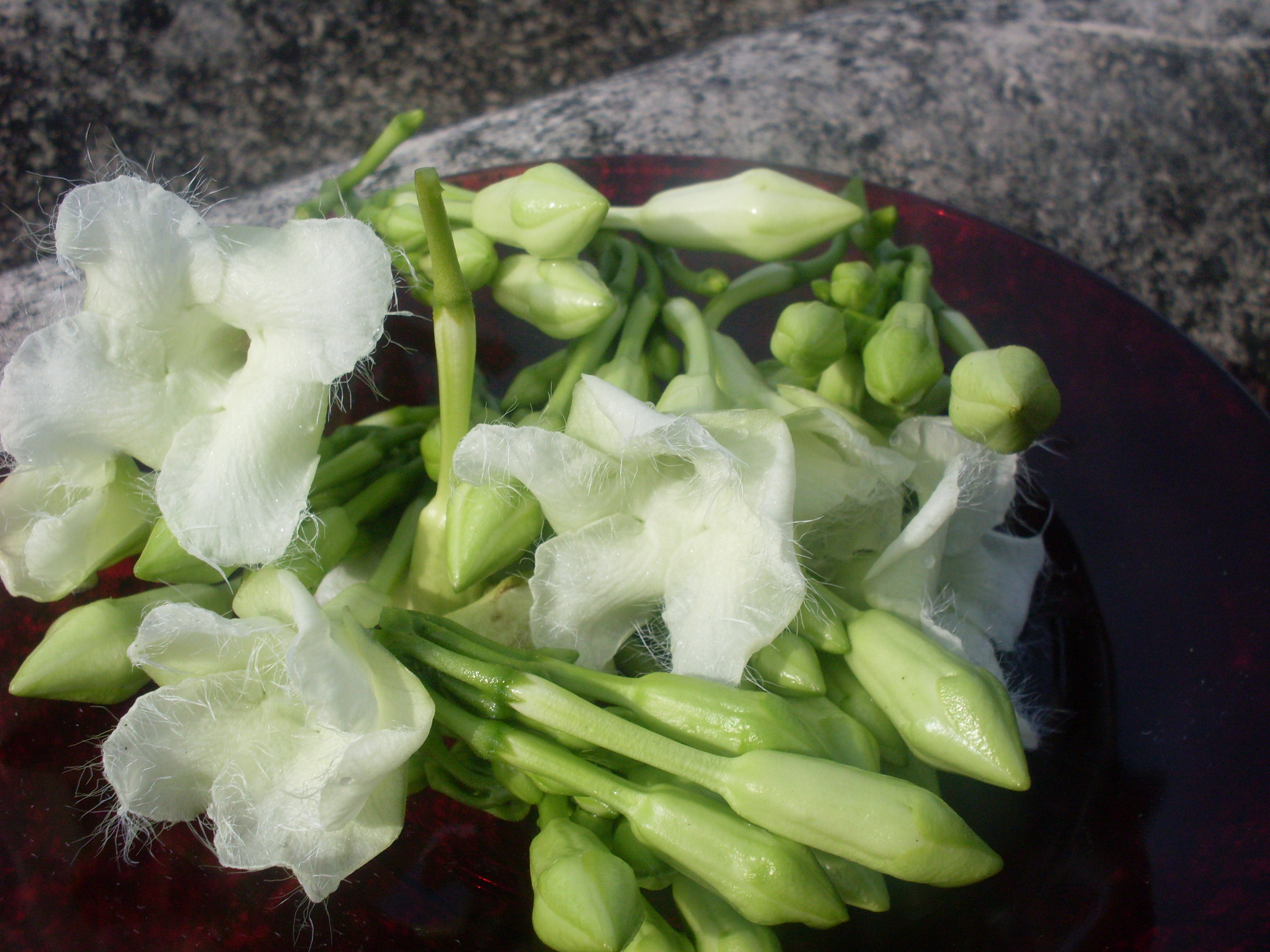
Echites panduratus (harvested, edible, hairy flowers)

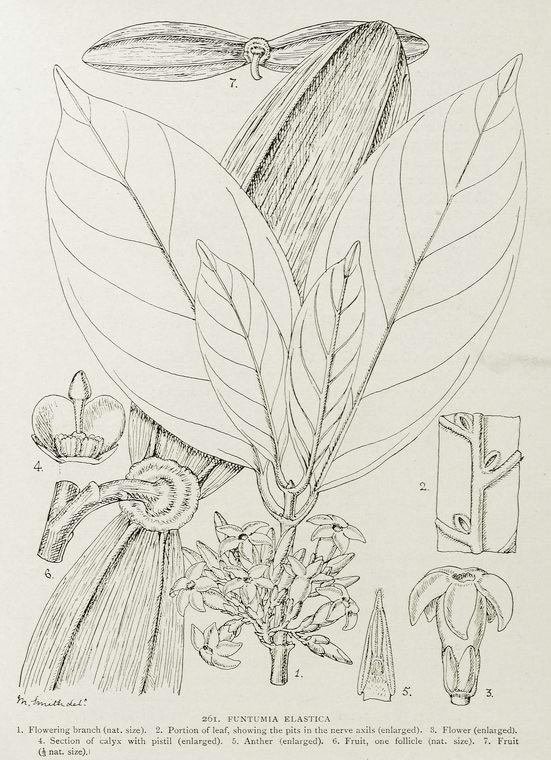
Funtumia elastica, former rubber source

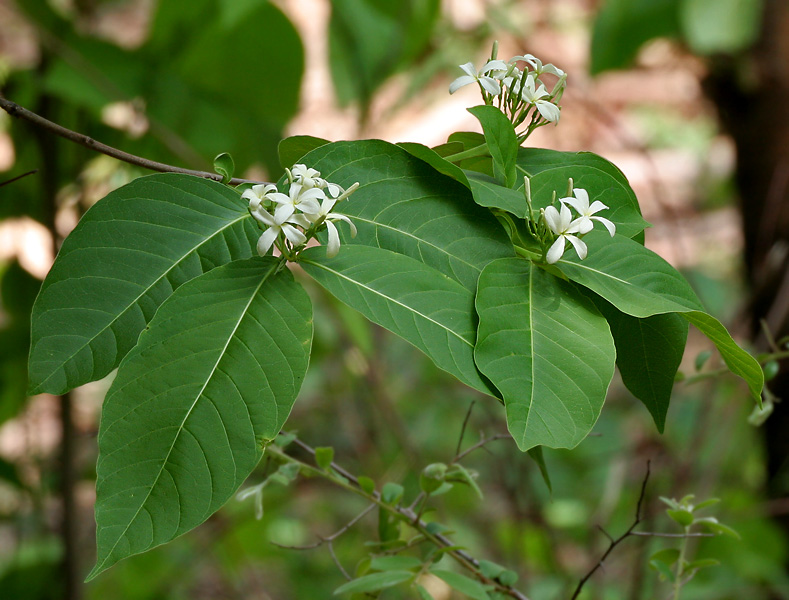
Holarrhena pubescens

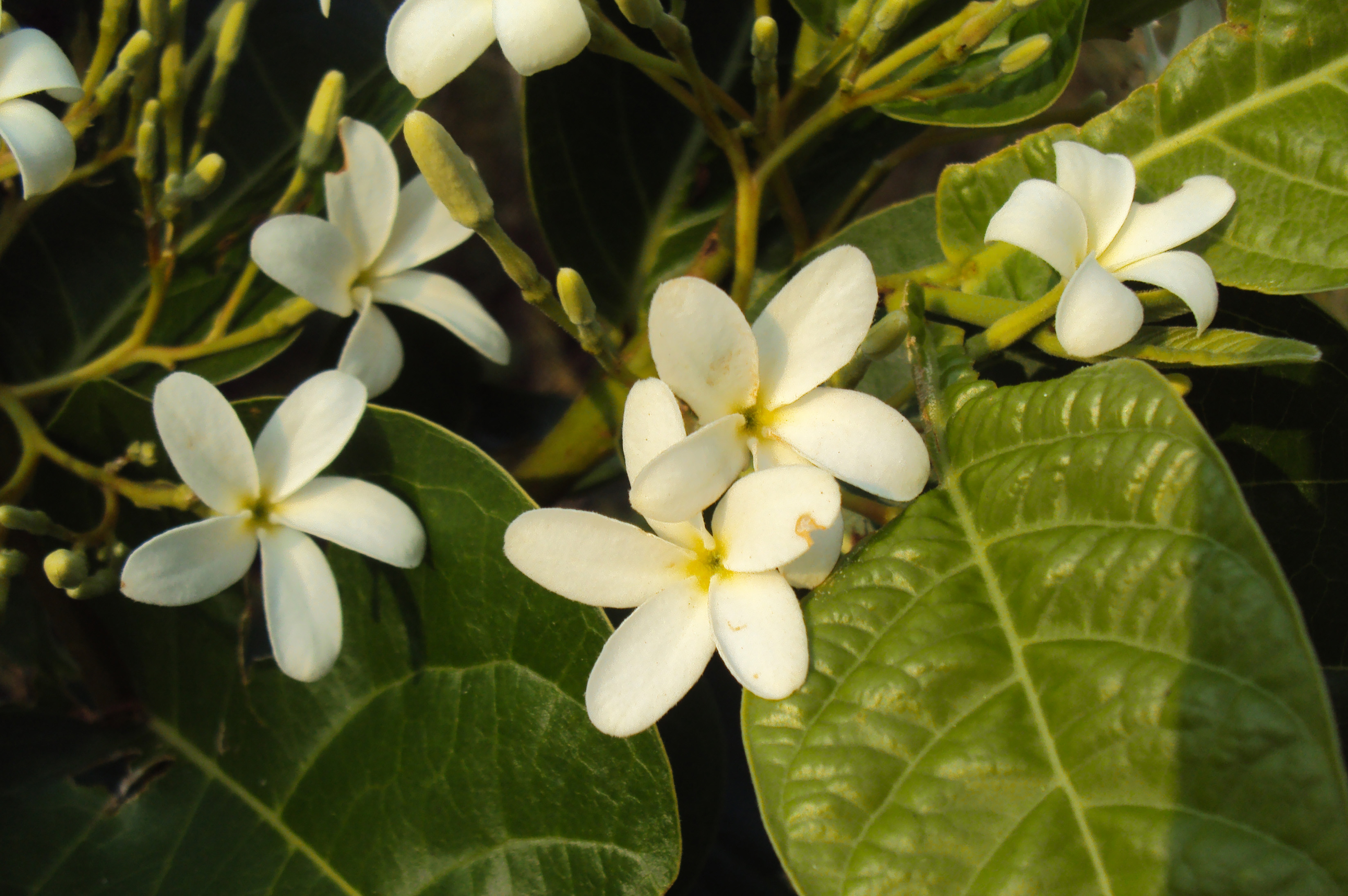
Holarrhena pubescens (detail)

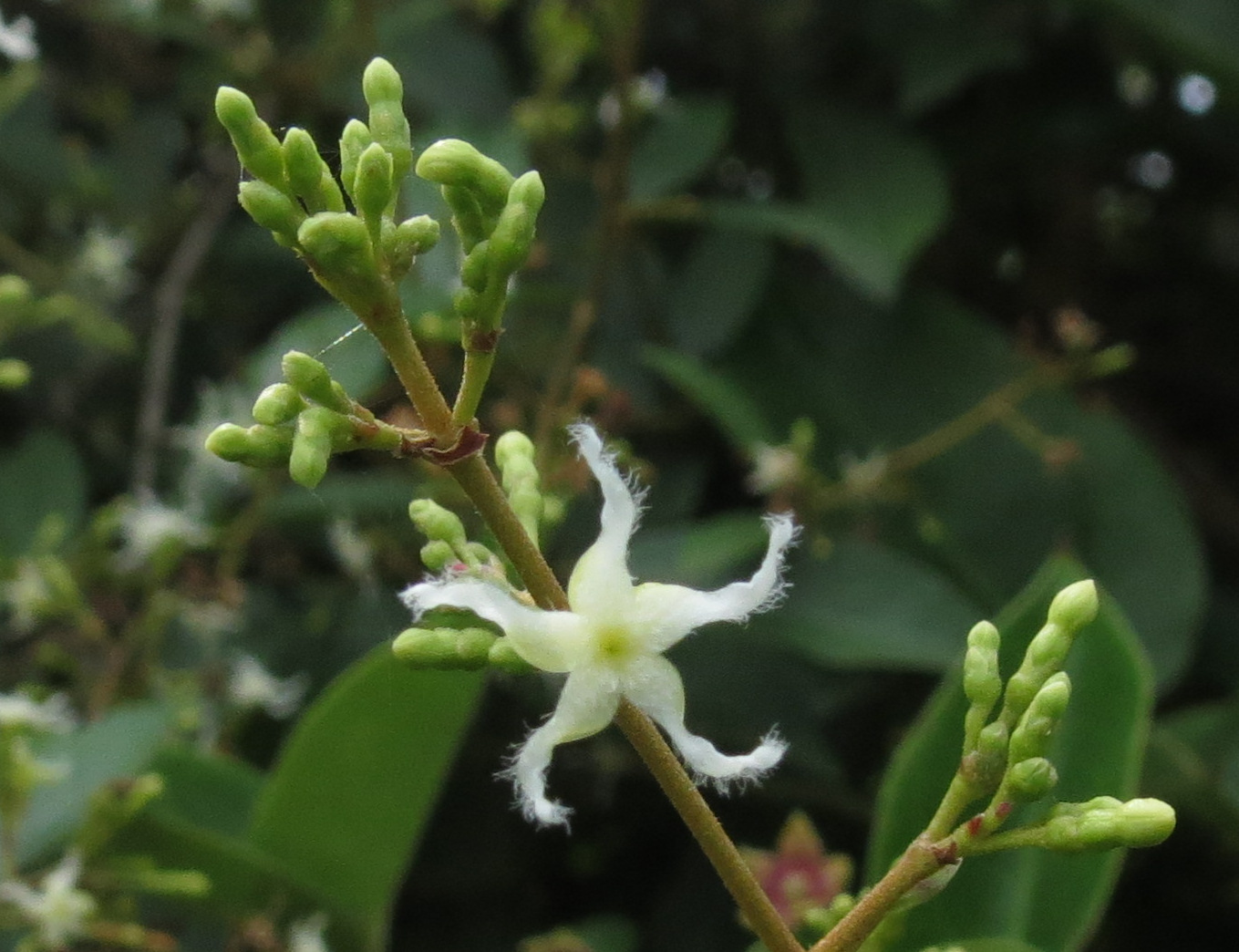
Ichnocarpus frutescens

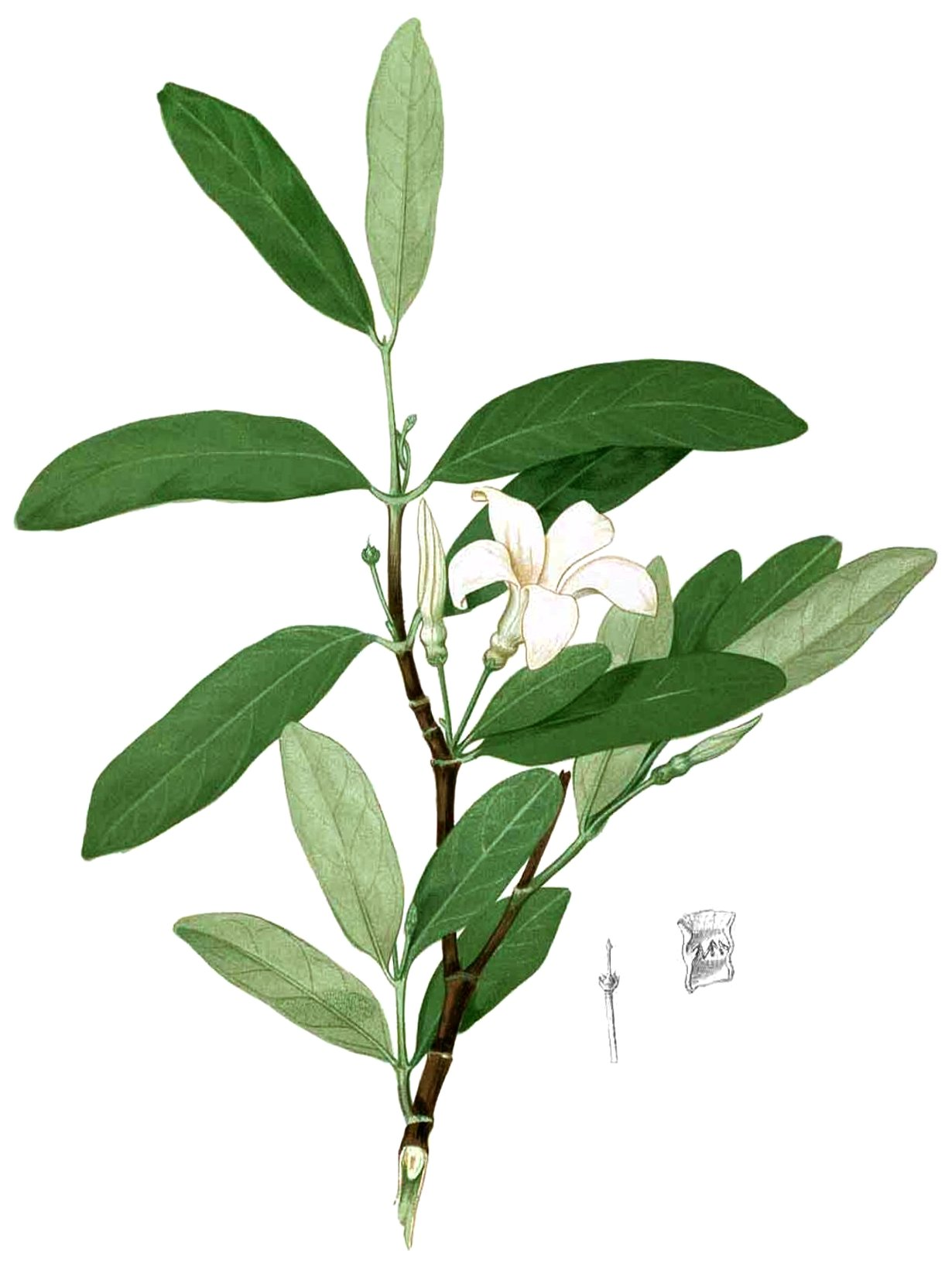
Kibatalia blancoi

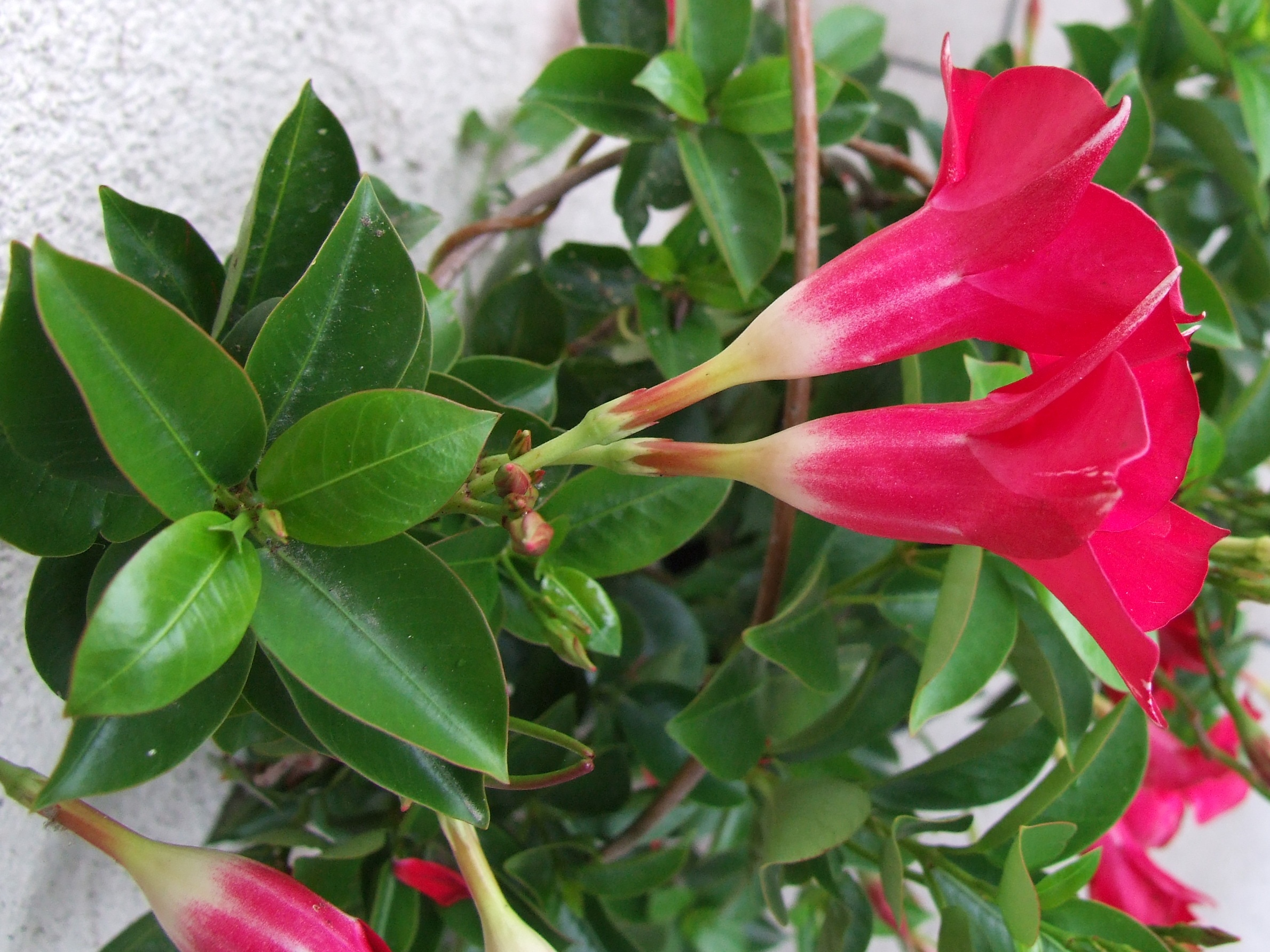
Mandevilla sanderi

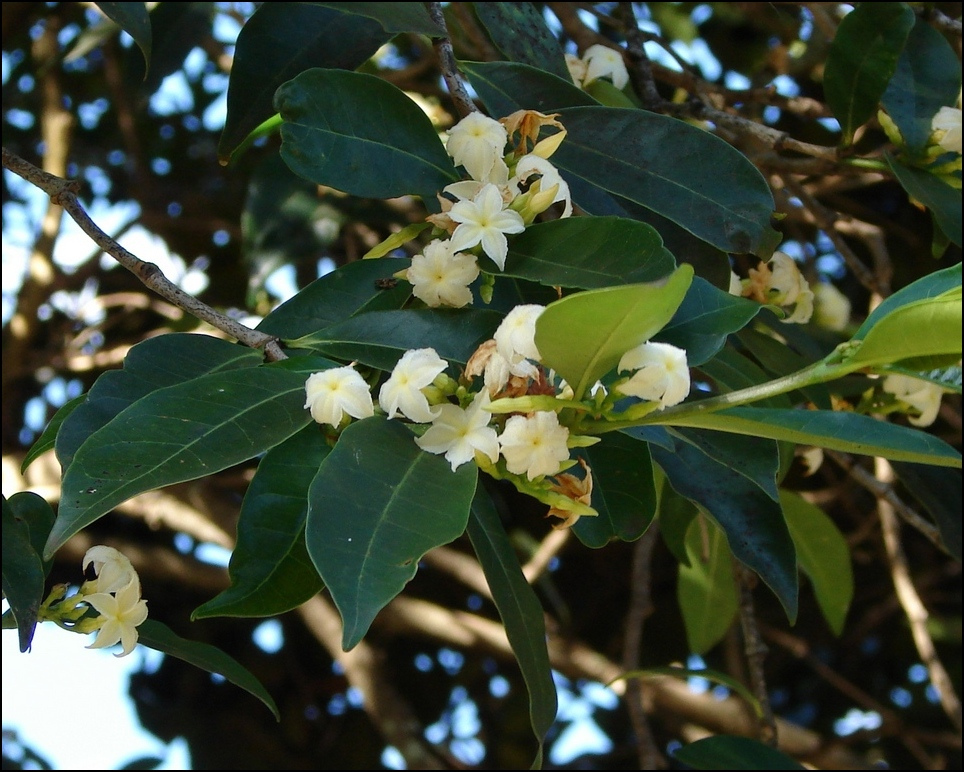
Mascarenhasia arborescens, former rubber source

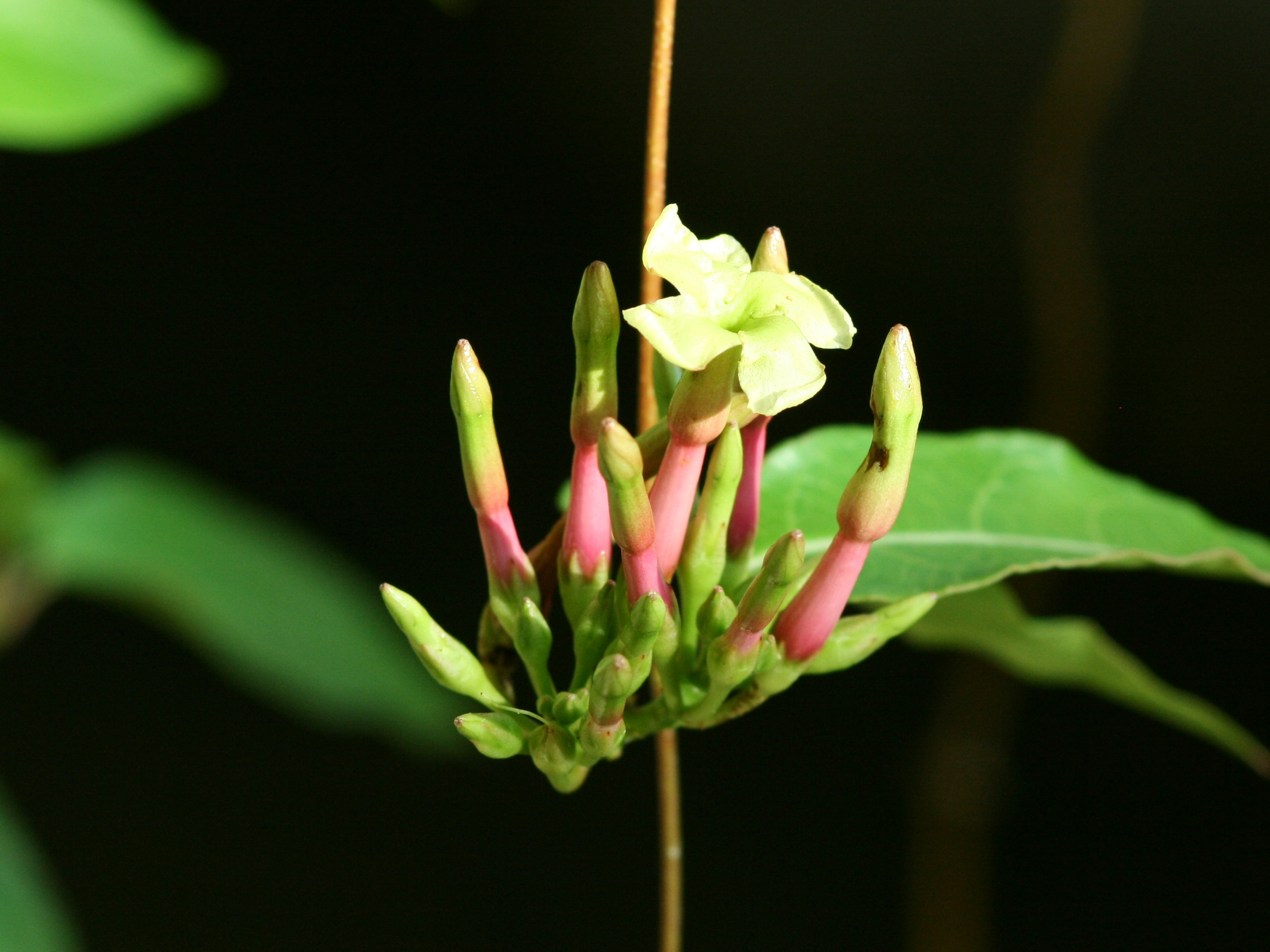
Mesechites trifida

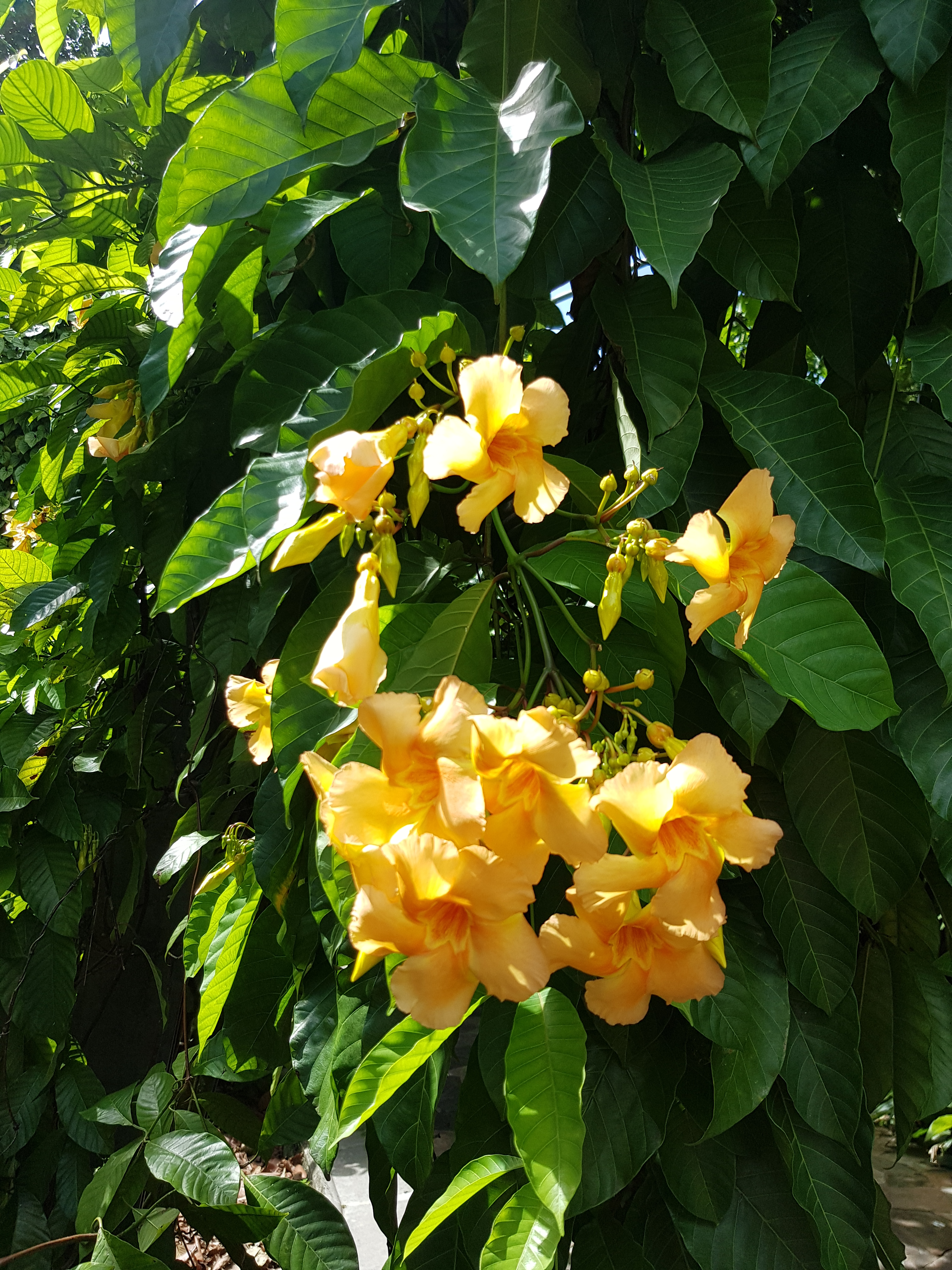
Odontadenia macrantha

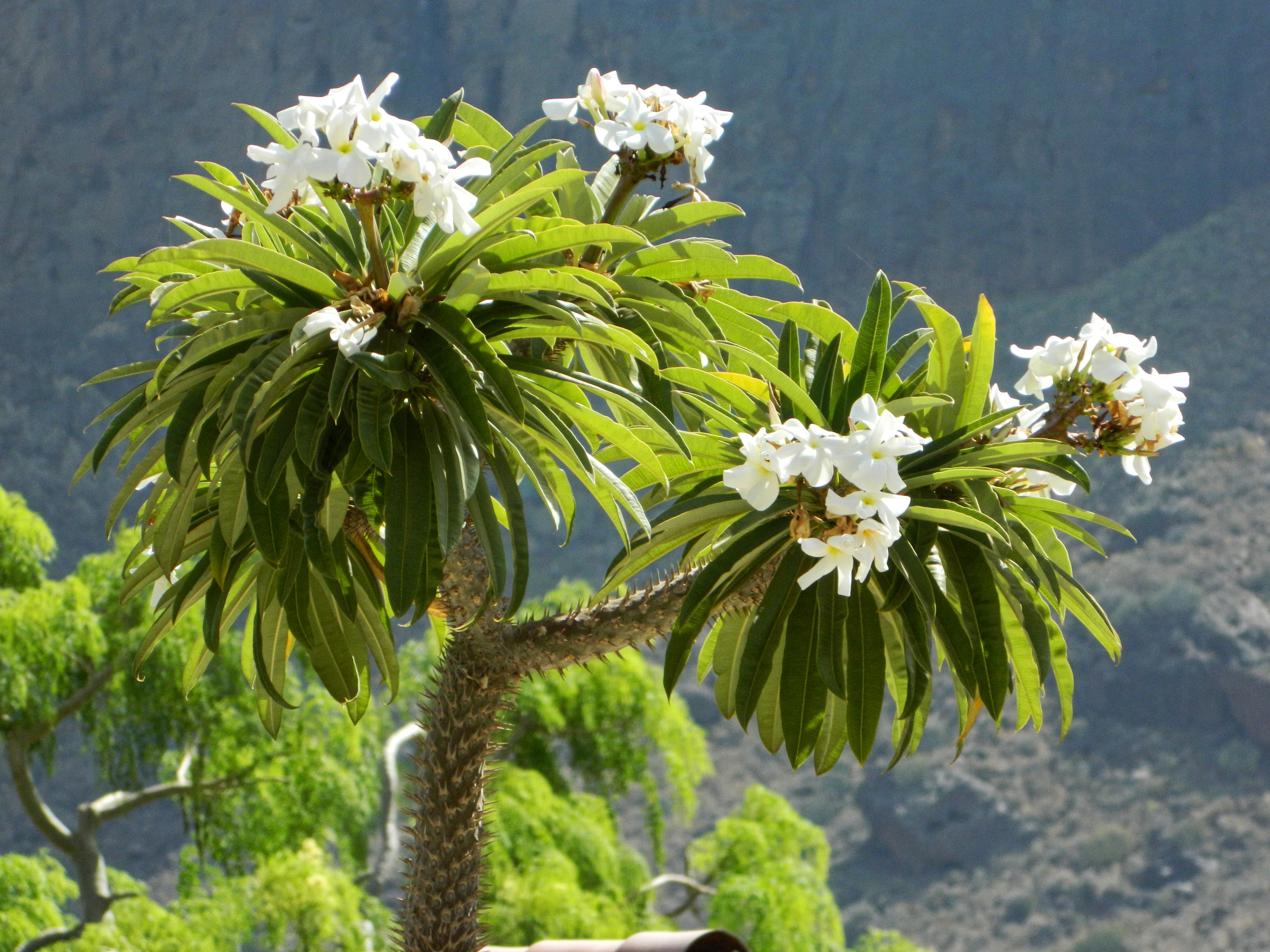
Pachypodium lamerei, a pachycaul species

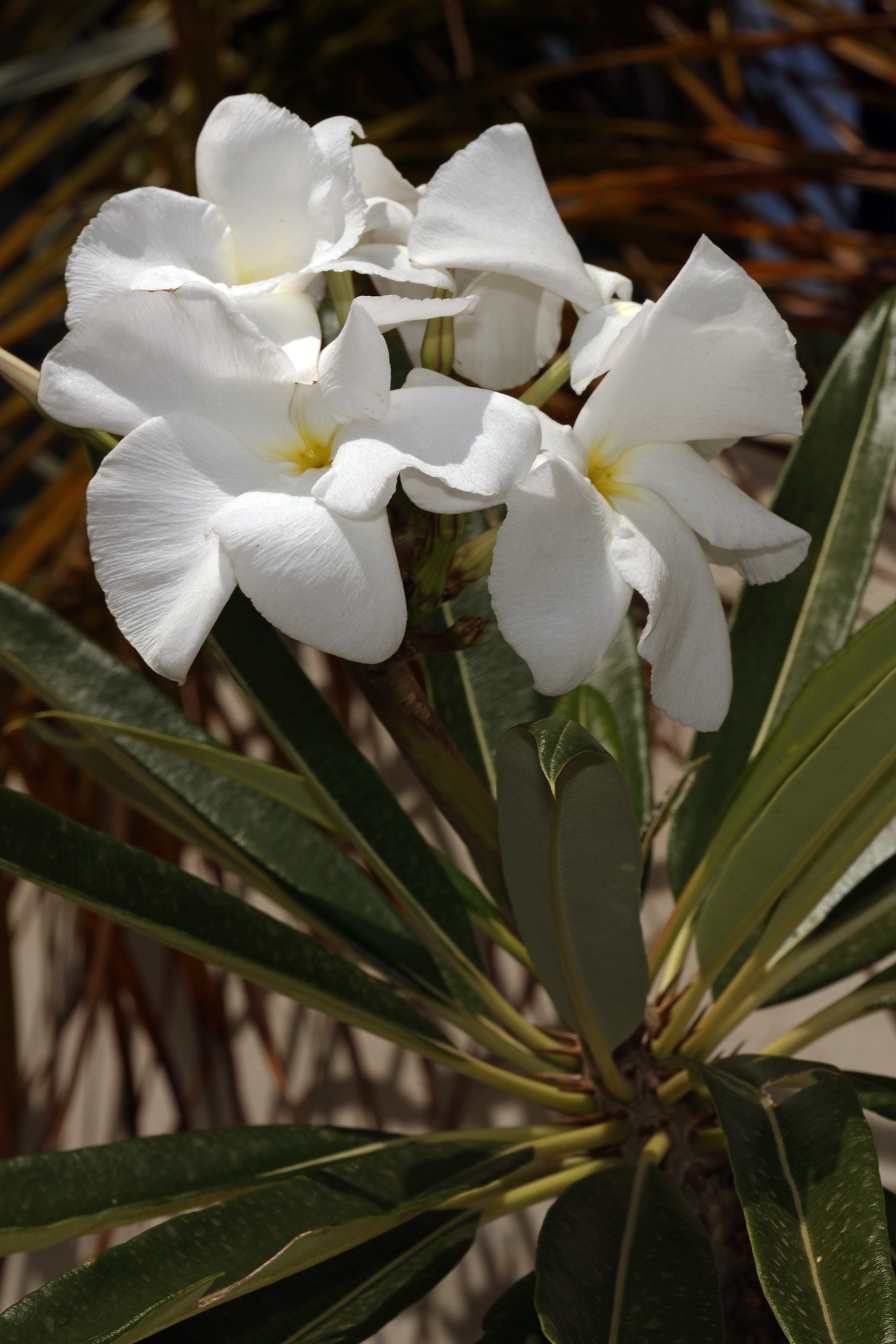
Pachypodium lamerei, close-up

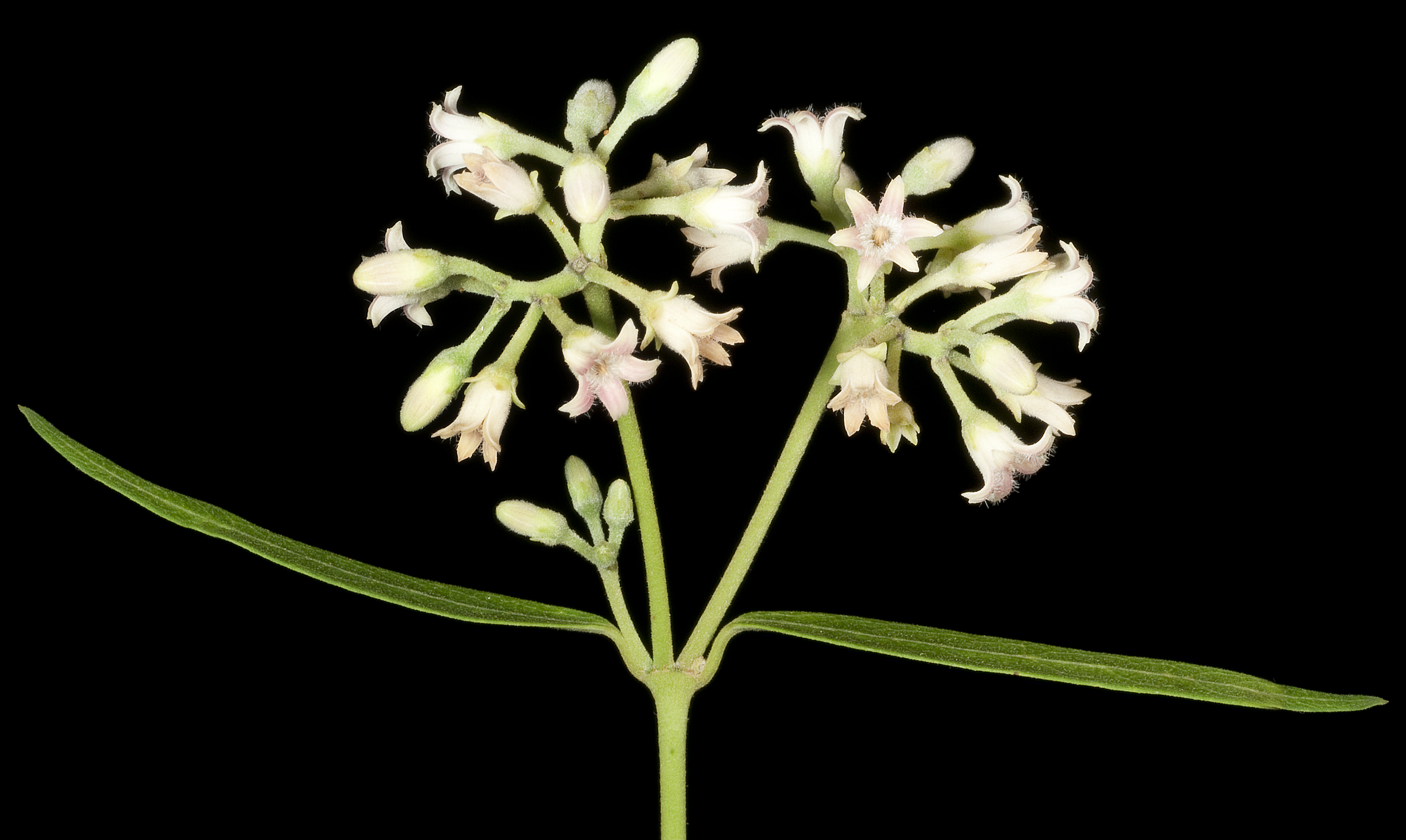
Parsonsia diaphanophleba

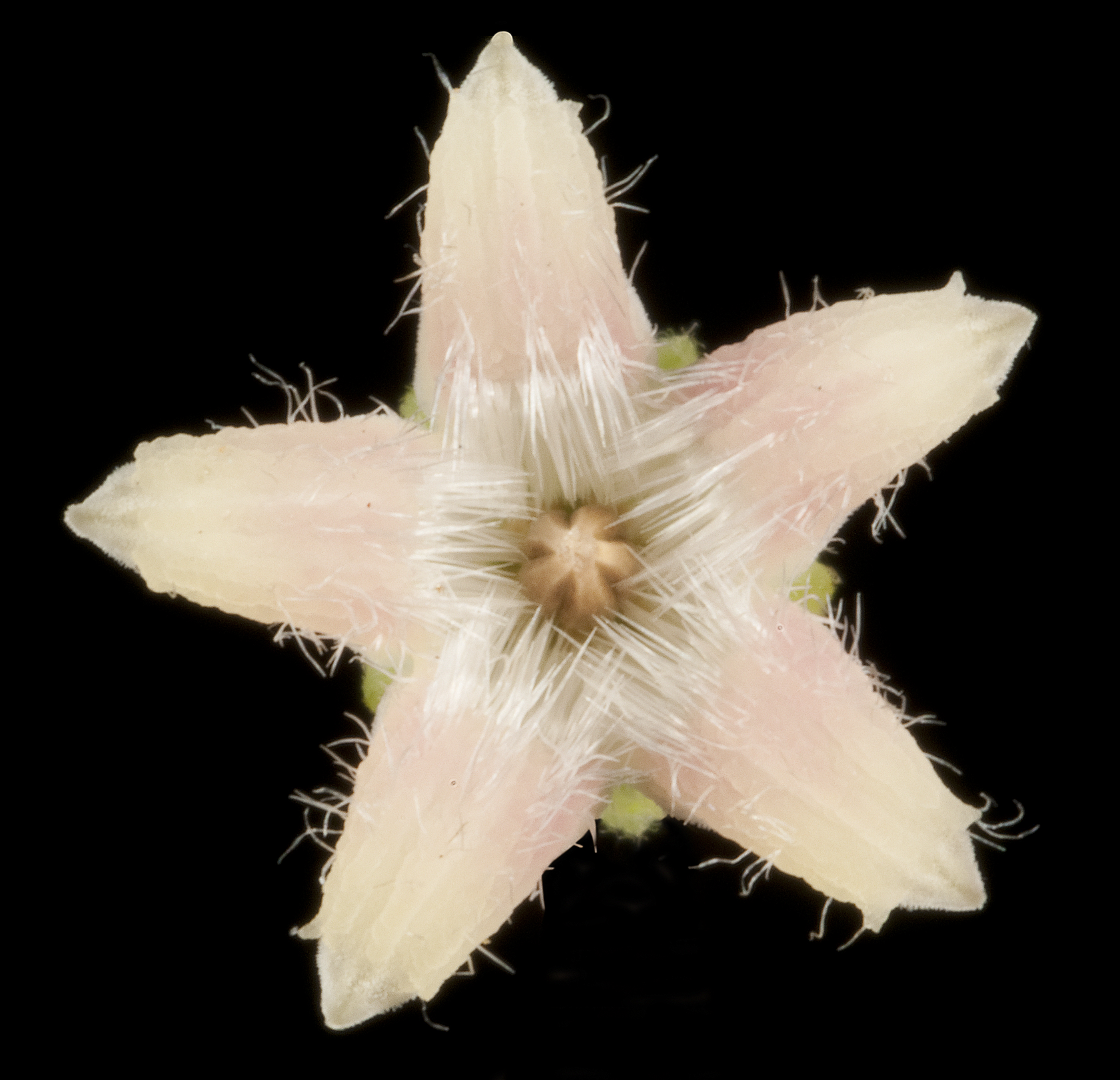
Parsonsia diaphanophleba, single flower

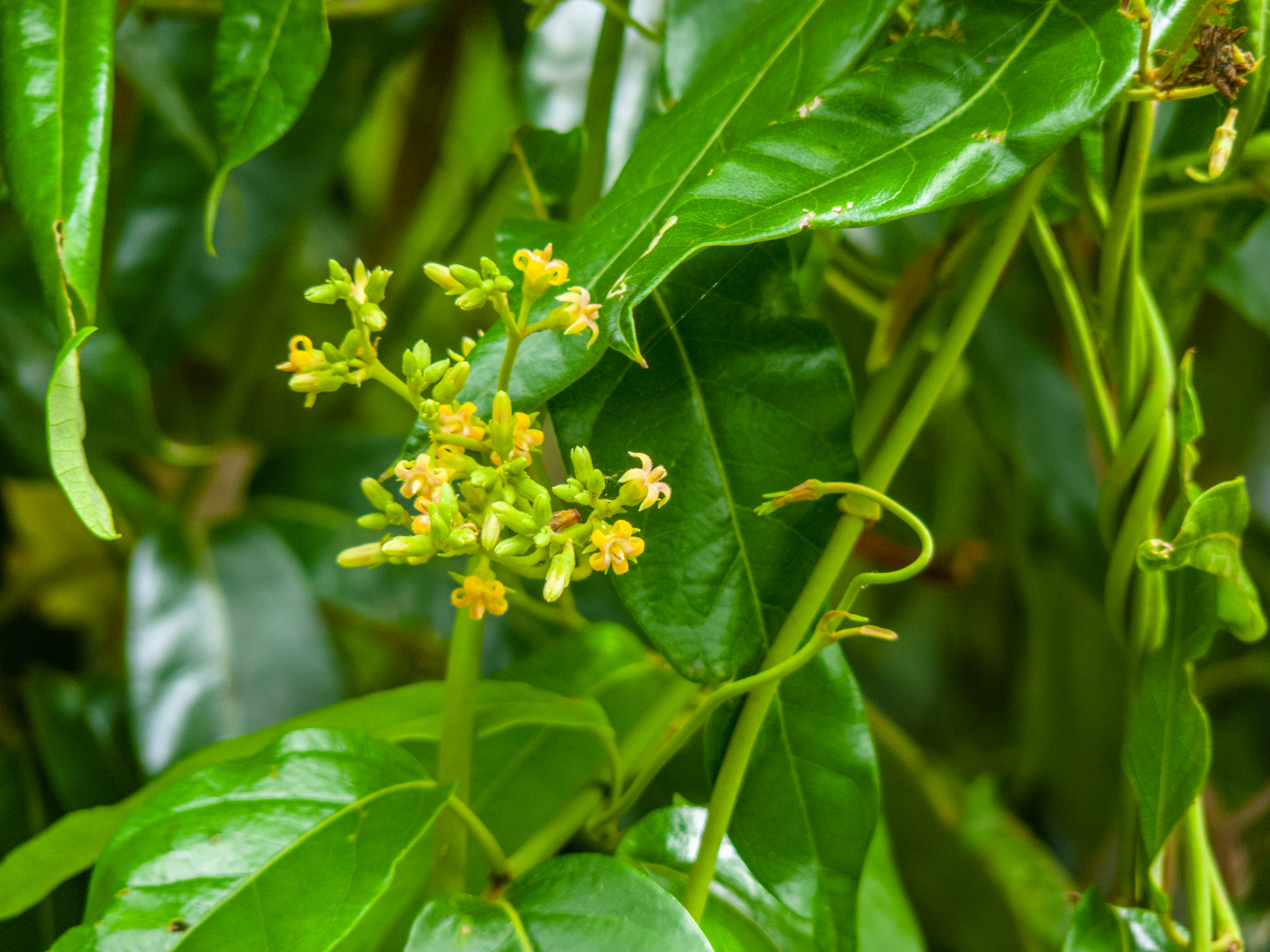
Parsonsia straminea

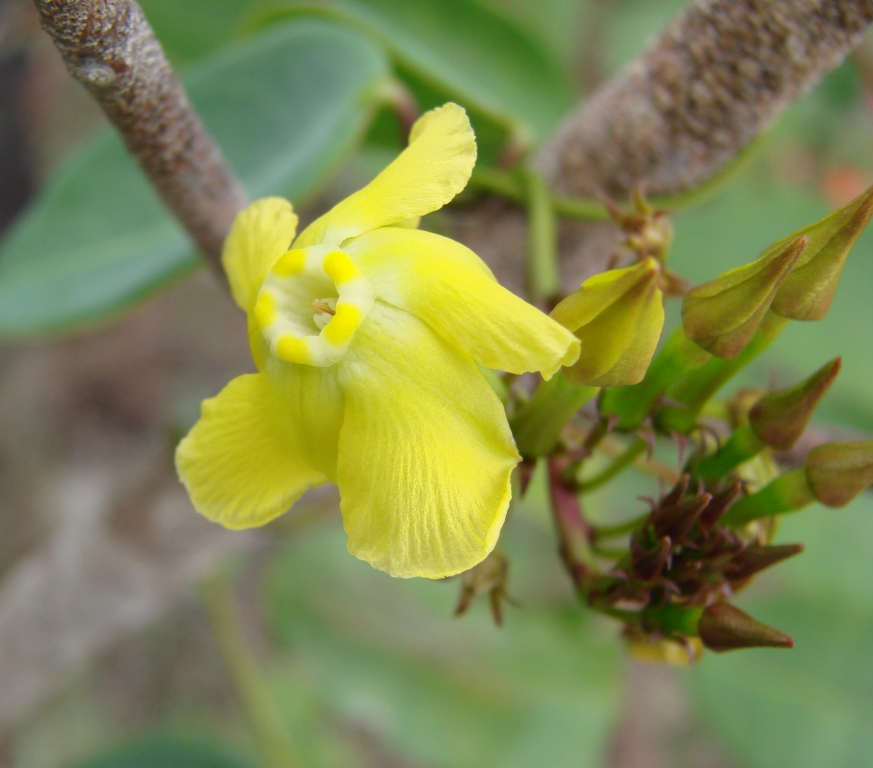
Prestonia coalita

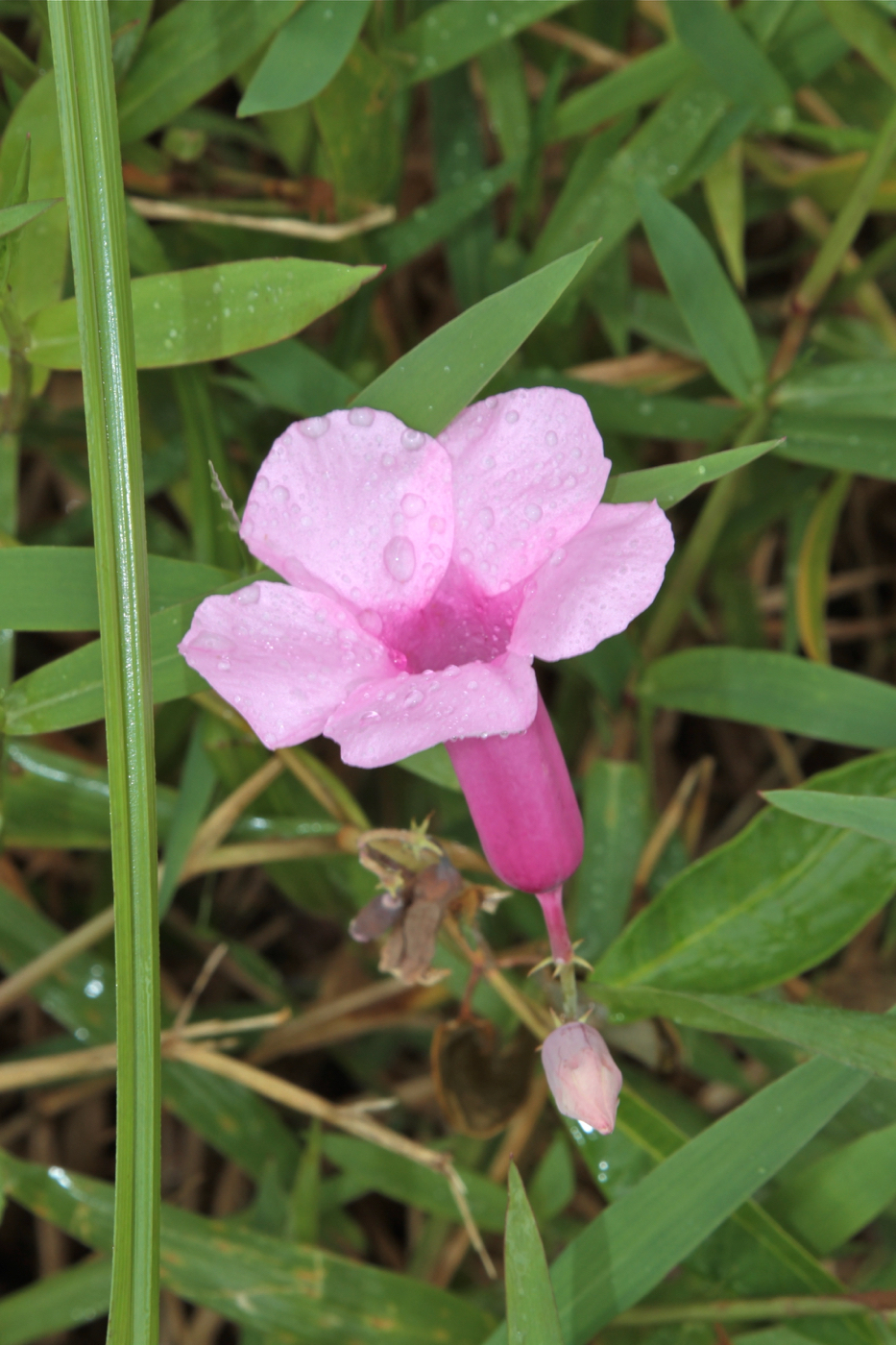
Rhabdadenia madida

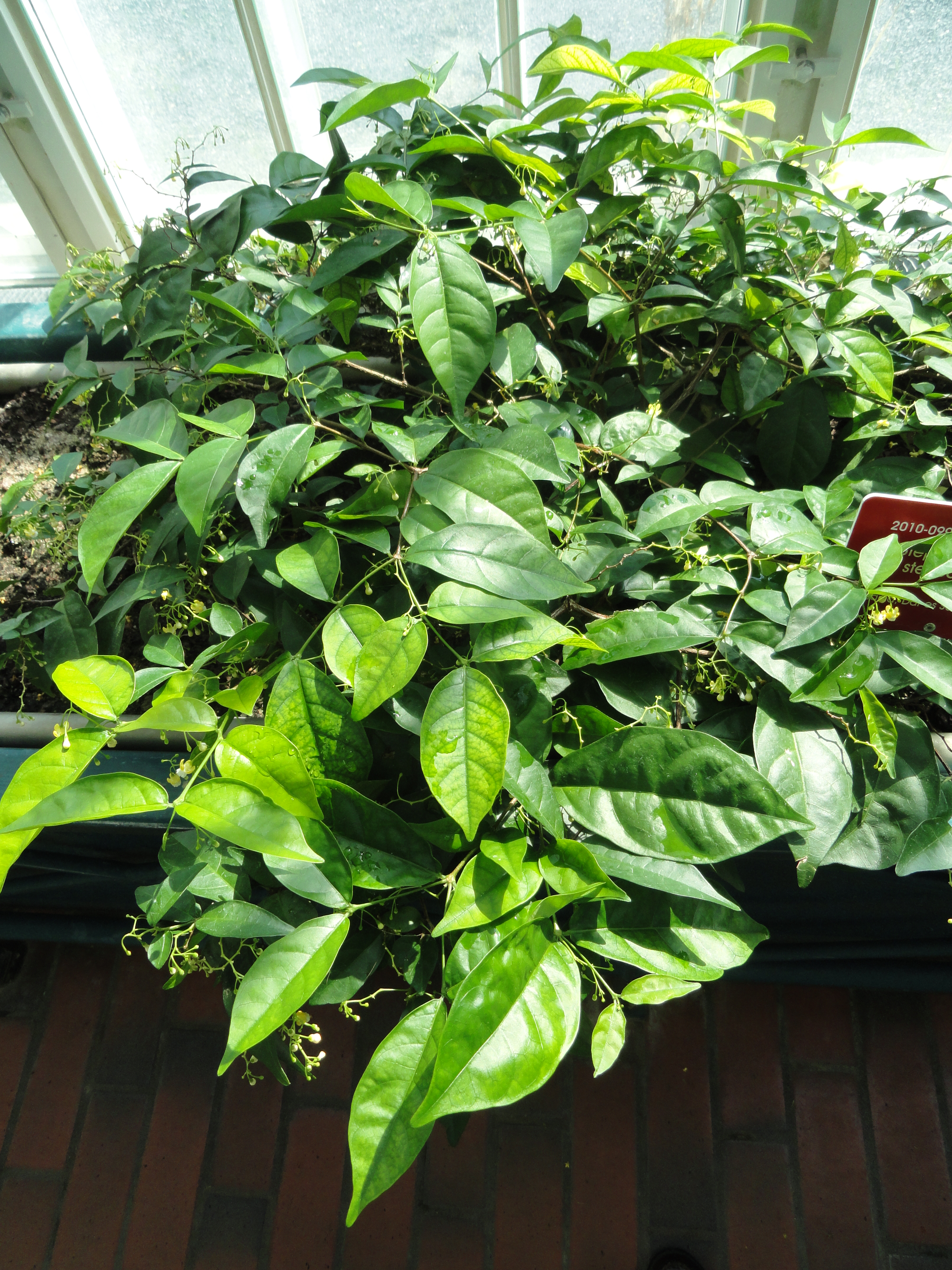
Stephanostema stenocarpa (flowers v. small relative to foliage)

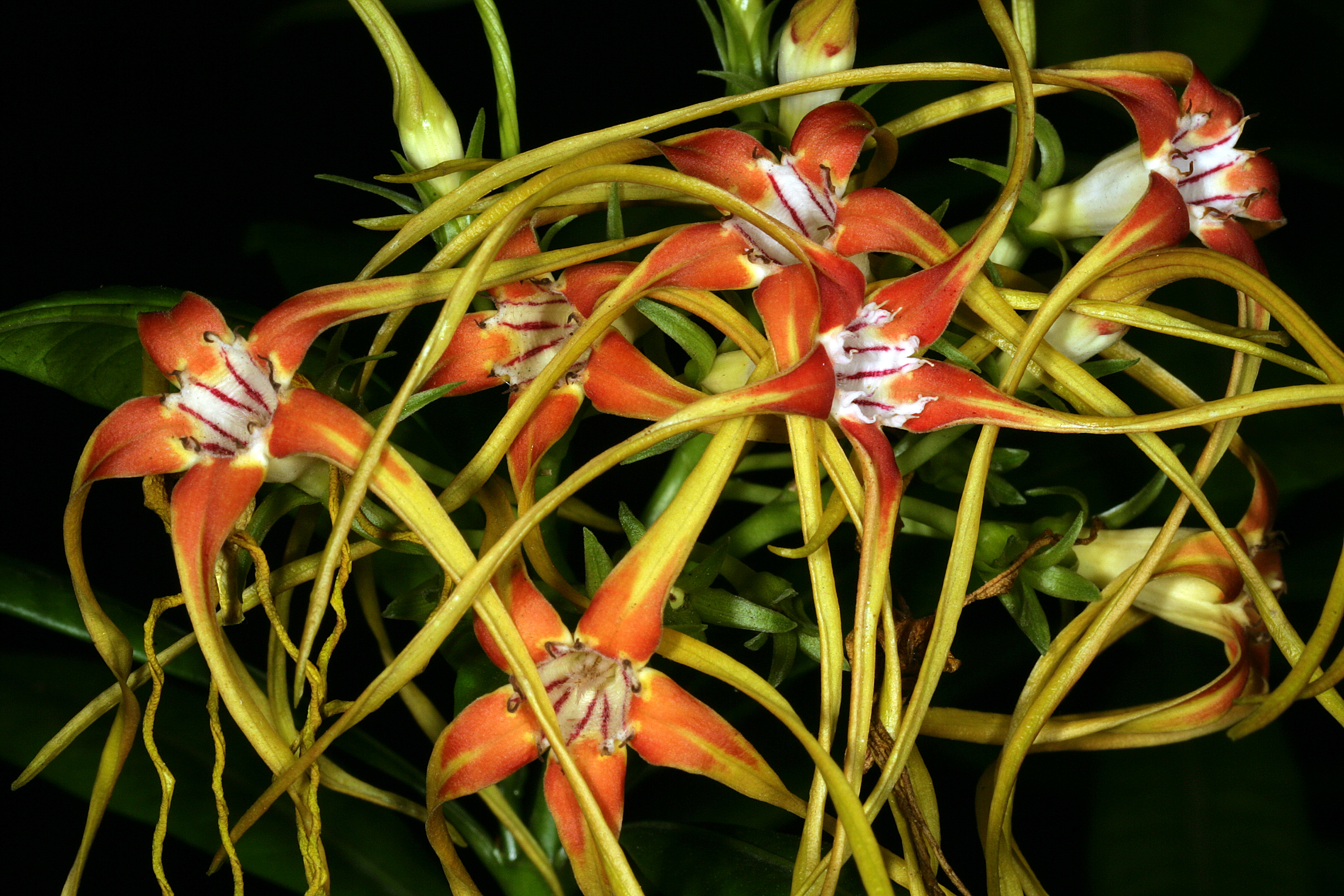
Strophanthus speciosus

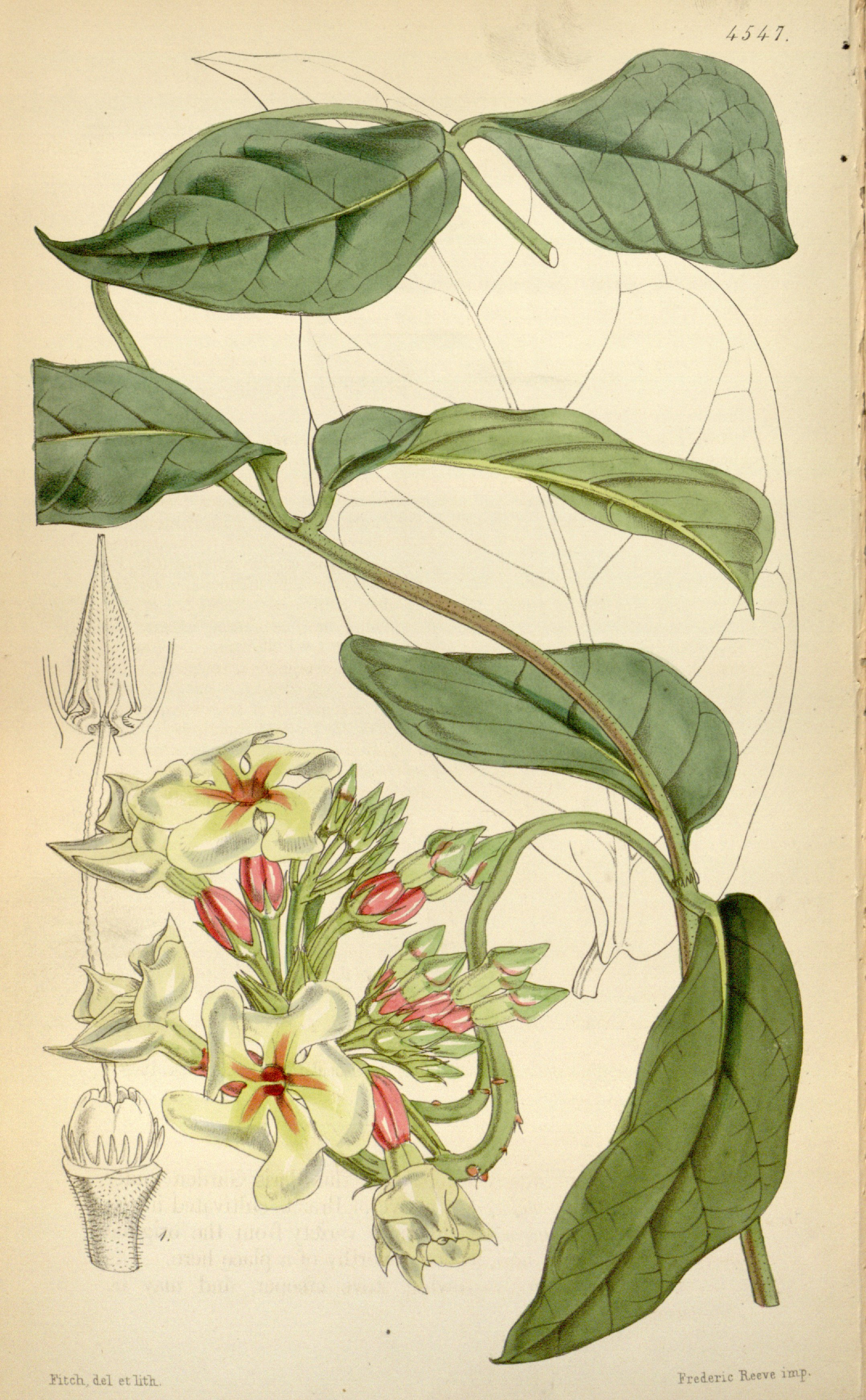
Temnadenia odorifera

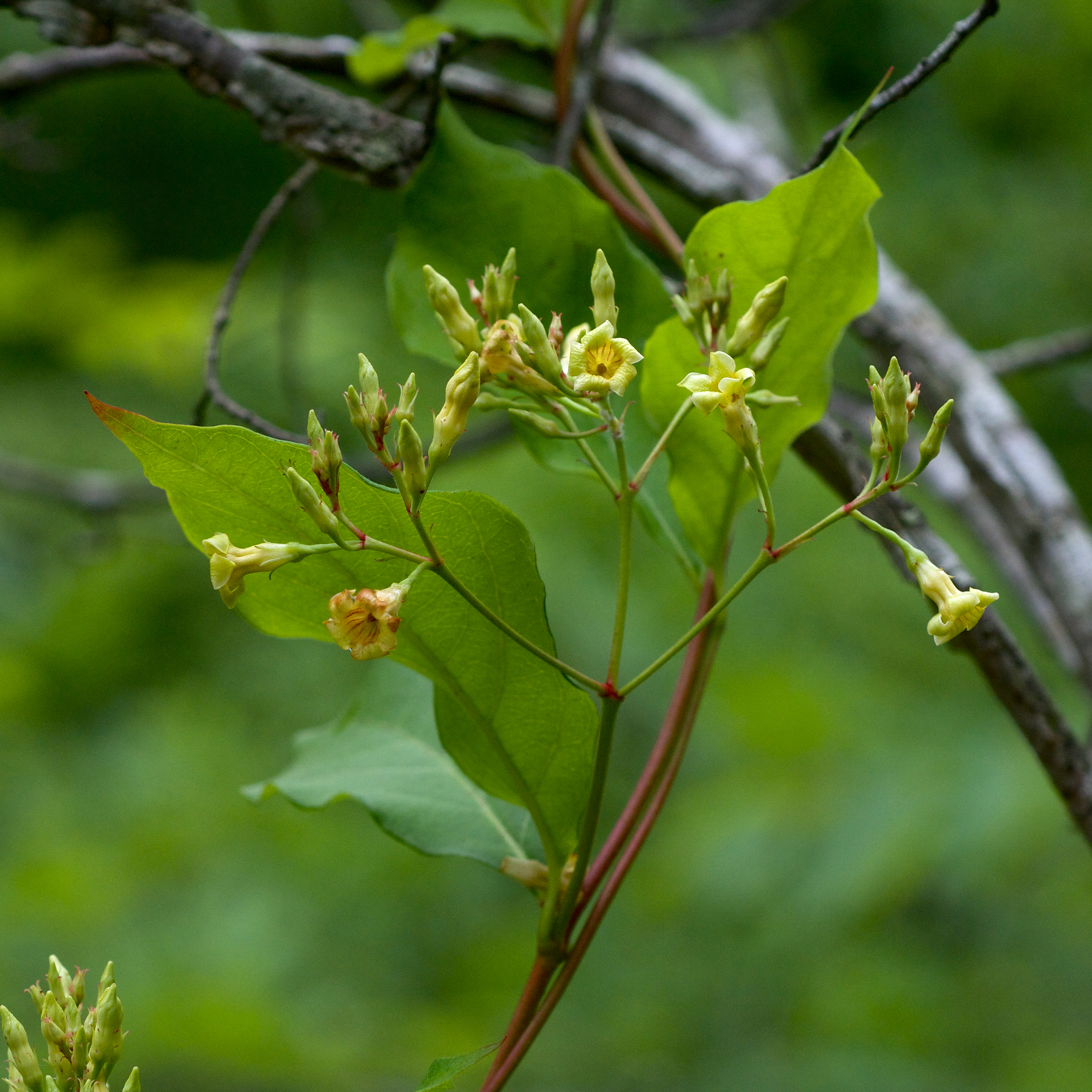
Thyrsanthella difformis

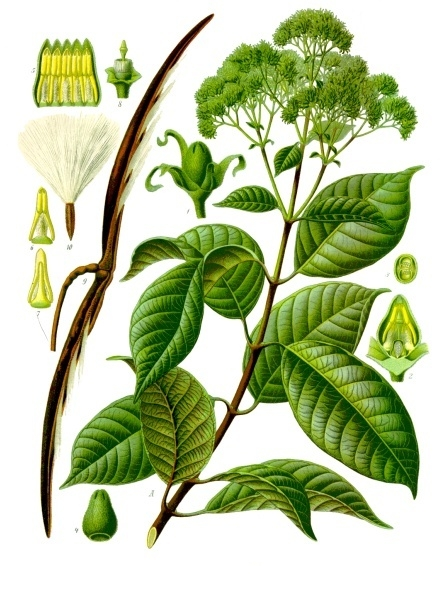
Urceola elastica

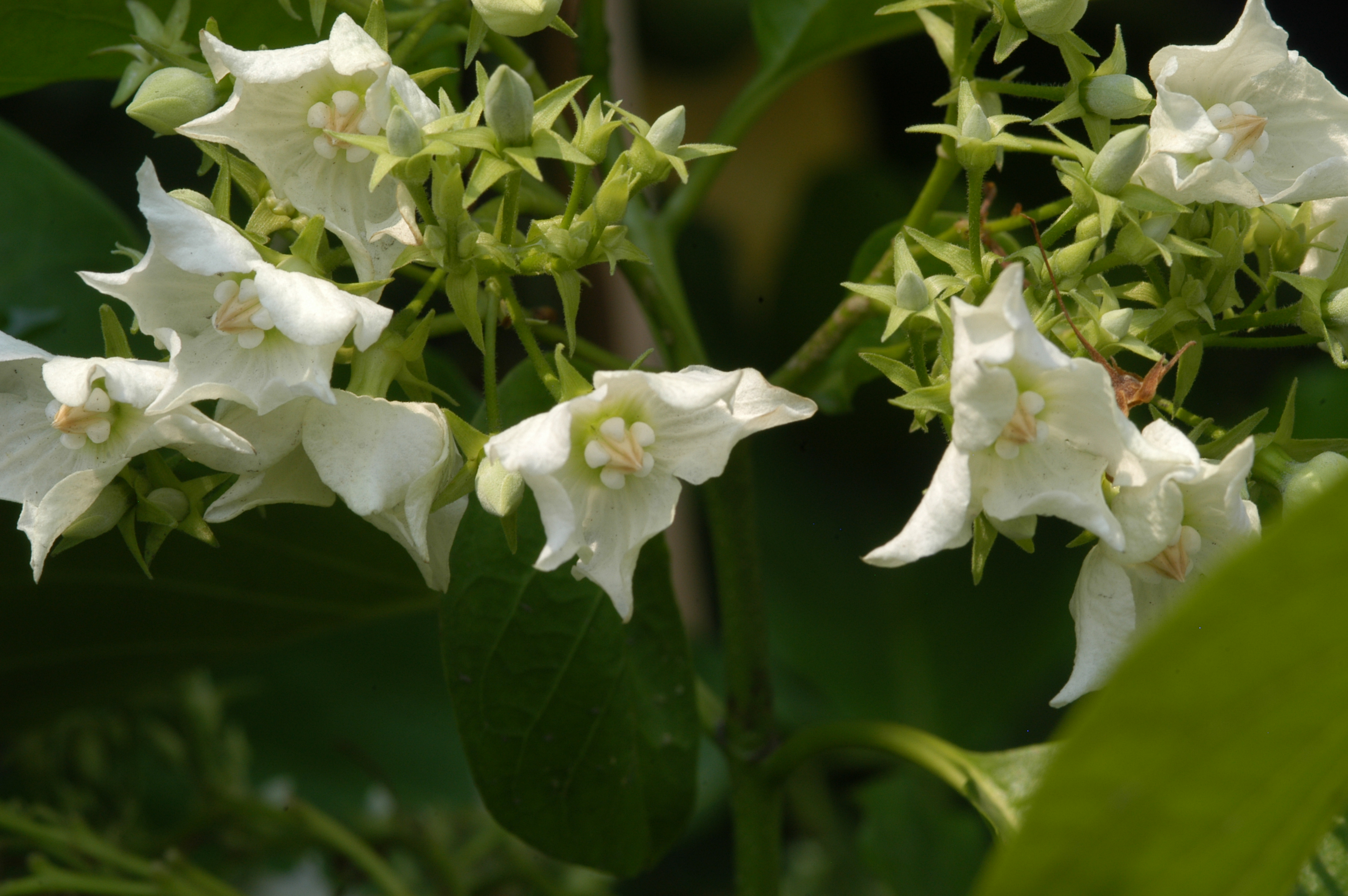
Vallaris glabra

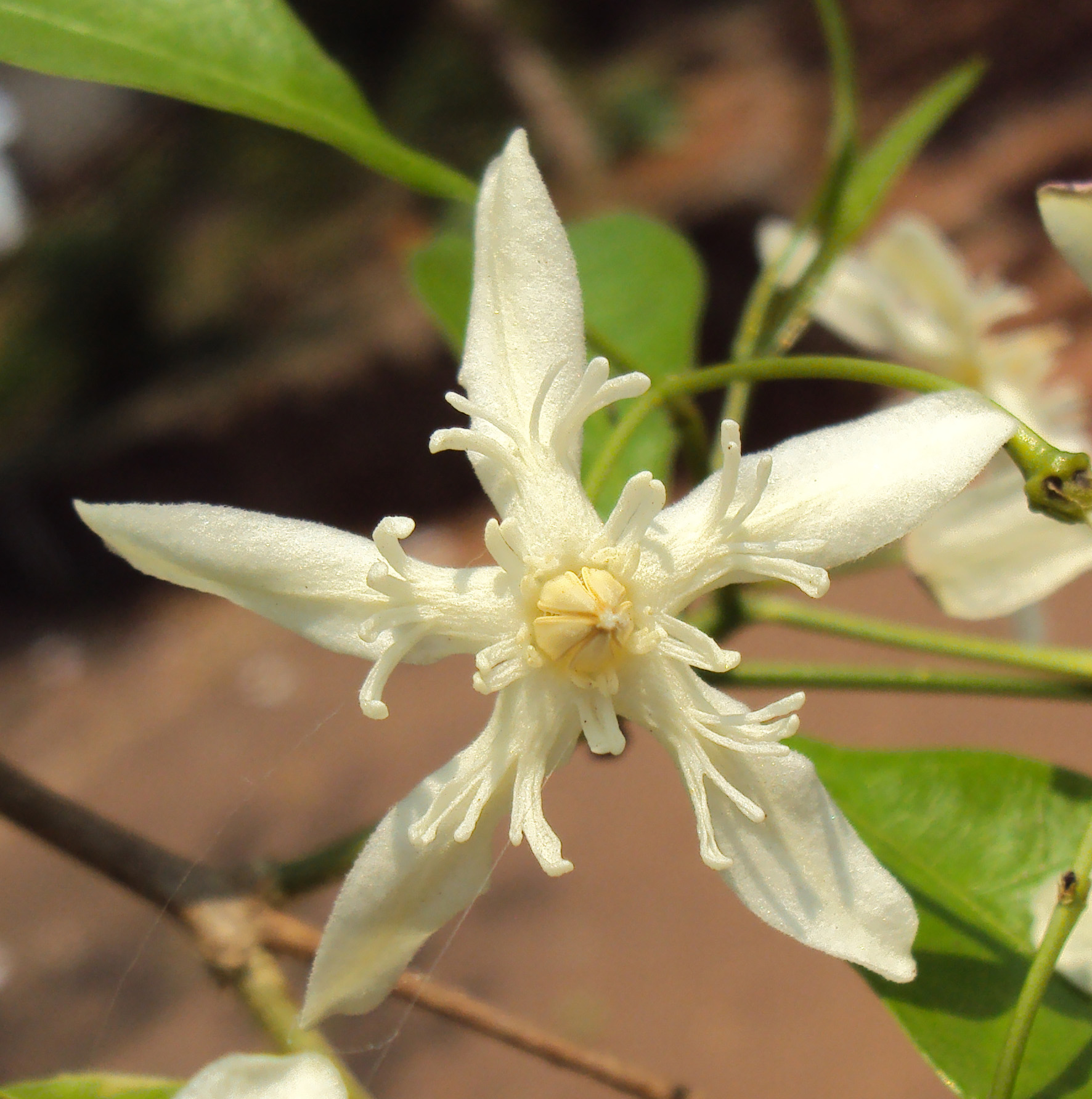
Wrightia tinctoria
