= Baharuia =

Scientific classification
- Kingdom: Plantae
- Clade: Tracheophytes
- Clade: Angiosperms
- Clade: Eudicots
- Clade: Asterids
- Order: Gentianales
- Family: Apocynaceae
- Subfamily: Apocynoideae
- Tribe: Apocyneae
- Genus: Baharuia; D.J.Middleton
- Species: B. gracilis

Binomial name
- Baharuia gracilis D.J.Middleton

Genus of flowering plants

Baharuia is a plant genus in the family Apocynaceae, first described as a genus in 1995. It contains only one known species, Baharuia gracilis, native to Borneo and northern Sumatra.
