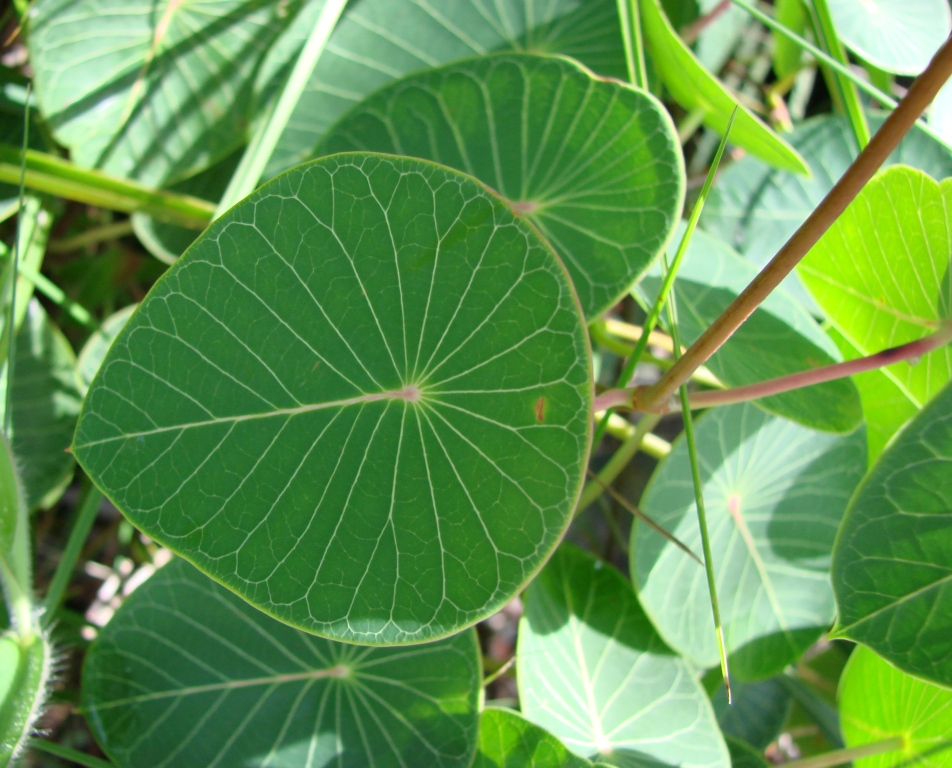

Scientific classification
- Kingdom: Plantae
- Clade: Tracheophytes
- Clade: Angiosperms
- Clade: Eudicots
- Clade: Asterids
- Order: Gentianales
- Family: Apocynaceae
- Subfamily: Apocynoideae
- Tribe: Odontadenieae
- Genus: Stipecoma; Müll.Arg.
- Species: S. peltigera

Binomial name
- Stipecoma peltigera (Stadelm.) Müll.Arg.

Synonyms
- Echites peltigerus Stadelm.; Echites tropaeolifolius A.DC.

= Stipecoma =

Genus of plants

Stipecoma is a genus of flowering plants in the family Apocynaceae, first described as a genus in 1860. It contains only one known species, Stipecoma peltigera, native to Brazil and Bolivia.

formerly included in the genus

- Stipecoma macrocalyx (Müll.Arg.) Miers = Peltastes macrocalyx (Müll.Arg.) Woodson
- Stipecoma mucronata Miers = Peltastes peltatus (Vell.) Woodson
- Stipecoma ovata Miers = Peltastes peltatus (Vell.) Woodson
- Stipecoma parabolica Miers = Peltastes peltatus (Vell.) Woodson
- Stipecoma peltata (Vell.) Miers = Peltastes peltatus (Vell.) Woodson
- Stipecoma plicata (A.DC.) Miers = Peltastes peltatus (Vell.) Woodson
- Stipecoma pulchra Miers = Peltastes pulcher (Miers) J.F.Morales
- Stipecoma speciosa Miers = Peltastes peltatus (Vell.) Woodson
