= Ixodonerium =

Scientific classification
- Kingdom: Plantae
- Clade: Tracheophytes
- Clade: Angiosperms
- Clade: Eudicots
- Clade: Asterids
- Order: Gentianales
- Family: Apocynaceae
- Subfamily: Apocynoideae
- Tribe: Apocyneae
- Genus: Ixodonerium; Pit.
- Species: I. annamense

Binomial name
- Ixodonerium annamense Pit.

Genus of plants

Ixodonerium is a genus of flowering plants in the family Apocynaceae, first described as a genus in 1933. It contains only one known species, Ixodonerium annamense, endemic to Vietnam.
