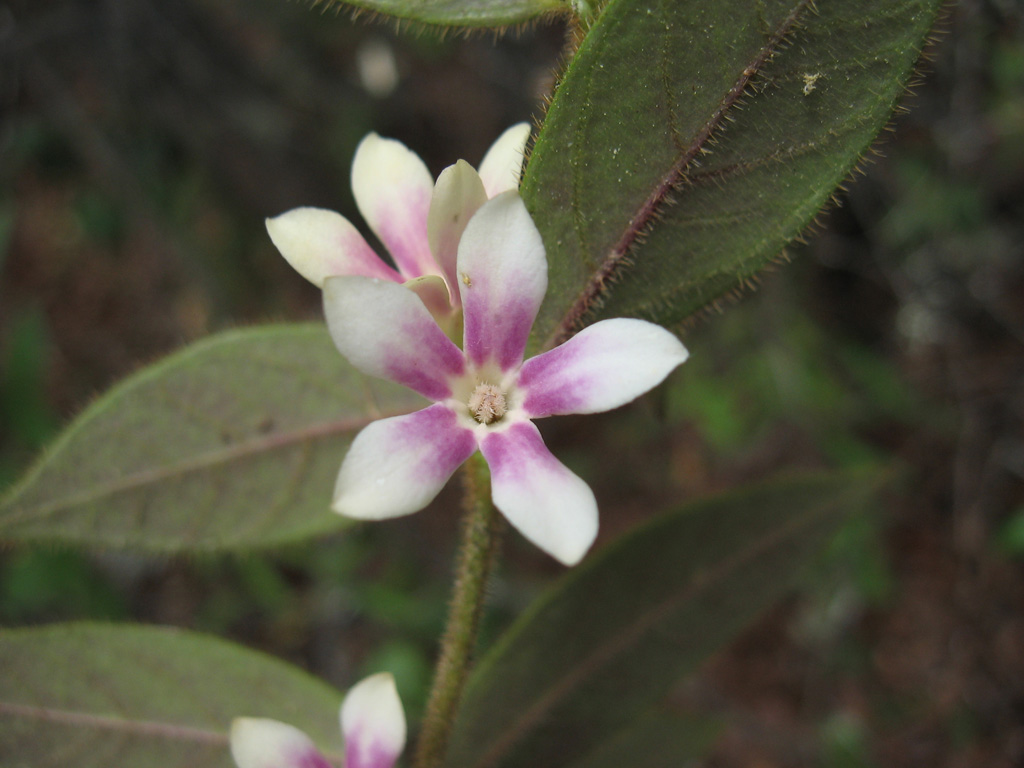

Scientific classification
- Kingdom: Plantae
- Clade: Embryophytes
- Clade: Tracheophytes
- Clade: Angiosperms
- Clade: Eudicots
- Clade: Asterids
- Order: Gentianales
- Family: Apocynaceae
- Subfamily: Apocynoideae
- Tribe: Odontadenieae
- Genus: Elytropus; Müll.Arg.
- Species: E. chilensis

Binomial name
- Elytropus chilensis (A.DC.) Müll.Arg.

Synonyms
- Echites chilensis A.DC.; Echites pubescens Hook. & Arn. 1830 not Willd. ex Roem. & Schult. 1819 nor Buch.-Ham. 1822; Echites ptarmicus Poepp.; Echites heterophyllus Miq. 1853 not J.F. Gmel. 1791; Elytropus ptarmica (Poepp.) Miers; Vinca sternutetoria Poepp. ex Reiche

= Elytropus =

Genus of plants

Elytropus is a genus of flowering plants in the family Apocynaceae, first described as a genus in 1860. It contains only one known species, Elytropus chilensis, native to Chile and to Rio Negro Province in Argentina.

formerly included

- Elytropus pubescens (Wall. ex G.Don) Miers = Holarrhena pubescens Wall. ex G.Don
- Elytropus spectabilis (Stadelm.) Miers = Macropharynx spectabilis (Stadelm.) Woodson
