= Ecua =

Scientific classification
- Kingdom: Plantae
- Clade: Tracheophytes
- Clade: Angiosperms
- Clade: Eudicots
- Clade: Asterids
- Order: Gentianales
- Family: Apocynaceae
- Subfamily: Apocynoideae
- Tribe: Echiteae
- Genus: Ecua; D.J.Middleton
- Species: E. moluccensis

Binomial name
- Ecua moluccensis D.J.Middleton

Genus of flowering plants

Ecua is a plant genus in the family Apocynaceae, first described in 1996. It contains only one known species, Ecua moluccensis.

It is endemic to Maluku Province in eastern Indonesia.
