= Asketanthera =

Scientific classification
- Kingdom: Plantae
- Clade: Tracheophytes
- Clade: Angiosperms
- Clade: Eudicots
- Clade: Asterids
- Order: Gentianales
- Family: Apocynaceae
- Subfamily: Apocynoideae
- Tribe: Echiteae
- Genus: Asketanthera; Woodson

Genus of plants

Asketanthera is a genus of plants in the family Apocynaceae first described as a genus in 1878. It is native to the West Indies.

Species

- Asketanthera calycosa (A.Rich.) Woodson - Cuba
- Asketanthera dolichopetala (Urb.) Woodson - Dominican Republic
- Asketanthera longiflora Woodson - Dominican Republic + Haiti
- Asketanthera obtusifolia Alain - Sierra del Bahoruco in Dominican Republic
- Asketanthera picardae (Urb.) Woodson - Haiti

Formerly included

Asketanthera steyermarkii Markgr., syn of Macropharynx steyermarkii (Markgr.) J.F.Morales
