= Eucorymbia =

Scientific classification
- Kingdom: Plantae
- Clade: Tracheophytes
- Clade: Angiosperms
- Clade: Eudicots
- Clade: Asterids
- Order: Gentianales
- Family: Apocynaceae
- Subfamily: Apocynoideae
- Tribe: Malouetieae
- Genus: Eucorymbia
- Species: E. alba

Binomial name
- Eucorymbia alba Stapf

Genus of plants

Eucorymbia is a genus of flowering plants in the family Apocynaceae, first described as a genus in 1905. It contains only one known species, Eucorymbia alba, native to Borneo, Sumatra, and peninsular Malaysia.
