= Hylaea (plant) =

Scientific classification
- Kingdom: Plantae
- Clade: Tracheophytes
- Clade: Angiosperms
- Clade: Eudicots
- Clade: Asterids
- Order: Gentianales
- Family: Apocynaceae
- Subfamily: Apocynoideae
- Tribe: Echiteae
- Genus: Hylaea; J.F.Morales

Type species
- Hylaea leptoloba J.F.Morales

Genus of plants

Hylaea is a genus of flowering plants in the family Apocynaceae, first described as a genus in 1999. It is native to the Amazon rainforest of southern Venezuela and northwestern Brazil.

Species

- Hylaea arborescens (Monach.) J.F.Morales - Amazonas State of Venezuela
- Hylaea leptoloba (Monach.) J.F.Morales - Amazonas State of Brazil
