= Galactophora =

Scientific classification
- Kingdom: Plantae
- Clade: Tracheophytes
- Clade: Angiosperms
- Clade: Eudicots
- Clade: Asterids
- Order: Gentianales
- Family: Apocynaceae
- Subfamily: Apocynoideae
- Tribe: Malouetieae
- Genus: Galactophora; Woodson

Genus of flowering plants

Galactophora is a genus of flowering plants in the family Apocynaceae, first described as a genus in 1932. It is native to South America.

Species

- Galactophora angustifolia J.F.Morales - Colombia
- Galactophora colellana Morillo - SE Colombia, S Venezuela, NW Brazil
- Galactophora crassifolia (Müll.Arg.) Woodson - Venezuela, Colombia, Peru, Bolivia, W Brazil
- Galactophora pulchella Woodson - S Venezuela, NW Brazil
- Galactophora pumila Monach. - SE Colombia, S Venezuela
- Galactophora schomburgkiana Woodson - S Venezuela, S Guyana, Roraima
