= Tintinnabularia =

Scientific classification
- Kingdom: Plantae
- Clade: Tracheophytes
- Clade: Angiosperms
- Clade: Eudicots
- Clade: Asterids
- Order: Gentianales
- Family: Apocynaceae
- Subfamily: Apocynoideae
- Tribe: Mesechiteae
- Genus: Tintinnabularia; Woodson

Genus of flowering plants

Tintinnabularia is a genus of flowering plants in the family Apocynaceae, first described for modern science as a genus in 1936. It is native to S Mexico, Guatemala, and Honduras.

Species

- Tintinnabularia gratissima J.F.Morales - Veracruz
- Tintinnabularia mortonii Woodson - Oaxaca, Chiapas, Guatemala
- Tintinnabularia murallensis J.K.Williams - Honduras
