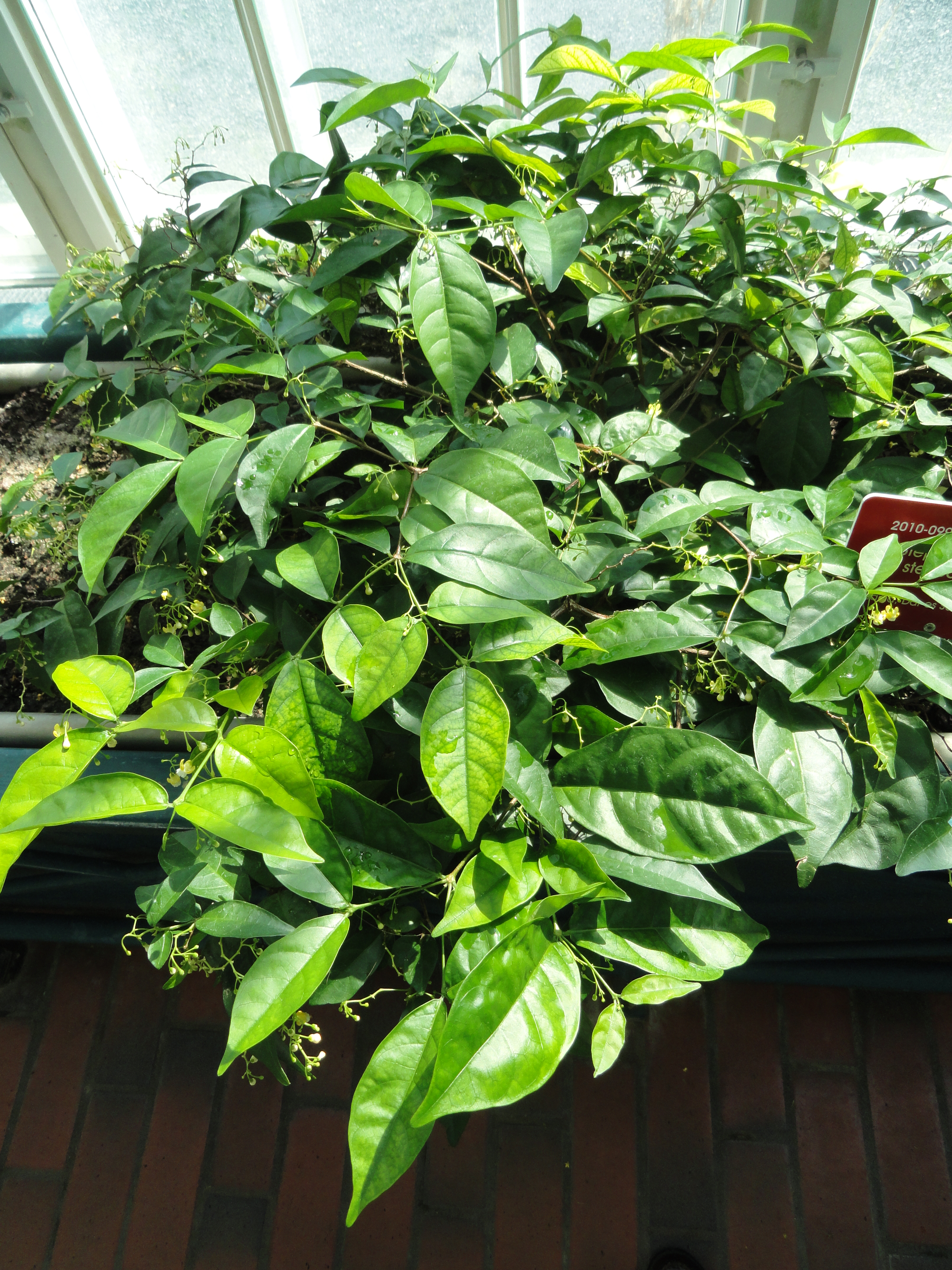
- Botanical specimen. The University of Helsinki Botanical Garden at Kaisaniemi

Scientific classification
- Kingdom: Plantae
- Clade: Tracheophytes
- Clade: Angiosperms
- Clade: Eudicots
- Clade: Asterids
- Order: Gentianales
- Family: Apocynaceae
- Subfamily: Apocynoideae
- Tribe: Wrightieae
- Genus: Stephanostema; K.Schum.
- Species: S. stenocarpum

Binomial name
- Stephanostema stenocarpum K.Schum.

= Stephanostema =

Genus of plants

Stephanostema is a genus of flowering plants in the family Apocynaceae, first described as a genus in 1904. It contains only one known species, Stephanostema stenocarpum, found only in the Uzaramo District in eastern Tanzania.
