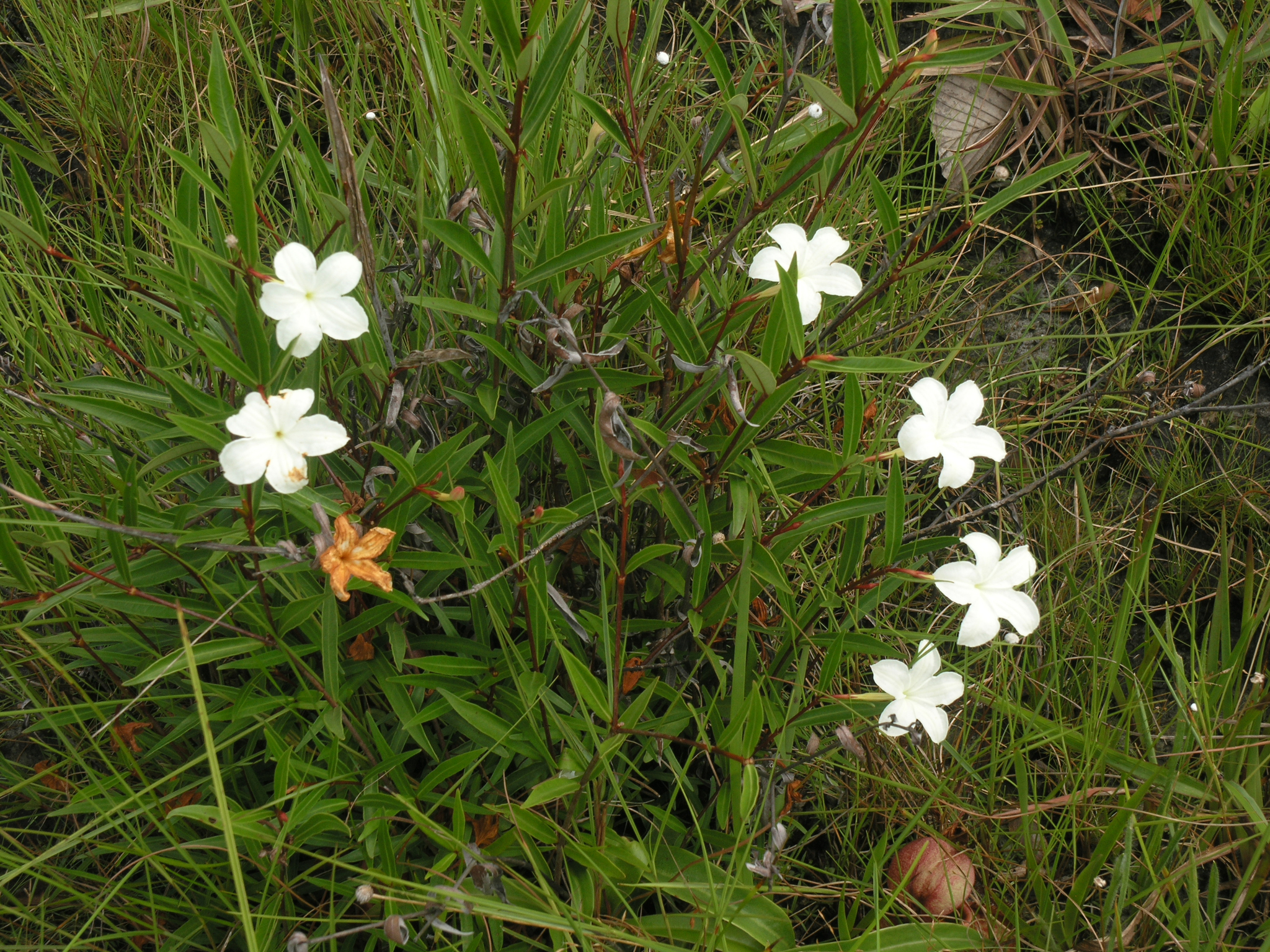
- Spirolobium cambodianum in Cambodia

Scientific classification
- Kingdom: Plantae
- Clade: Tracheophytes
- Clade: Angiosperms
- Clade: Eudicots
- Clade: Asterids
- Order: Gentianales
- Family: Apocynaceae
- Subfamily: Apocynoideae
- Tribe: Malouetieae
- Genus: Spirolobium; Baill. 1889, conserved name, not Orb. 1839
- Species: S. cambodianum

Binomial name
- Spirolobium cambodianum Baill.

Synonyms
- Holarrhena pauciflora Ridl.

= Spirolobium =

Genus of plants

Spirolobium is a genus of flowering plants in the family Apocynaceae, first described as a genus in 1889. It includes only one known species, Spirolobium cambodianum, native to Southeast Asia (Vietnam, Laos, Cambodia, Thailand, Malaysia, Borneo).
