= Streptoechites =

Scientific classification
- Kingdom: Plantae
- Clade: Tracheophytes
- Clade: Angiosperms
- Clade: Eudicots
- Clade: Asterids
- Order: Gentianales
- Family: Apocynaceae
- Genus: Streptoechites; D.J.Middleton & Livsh.

Genus of plants

Streptoechites is a genus of flowering plants belonging to the family Apocynaceae.

Its native range is Hainan to Indo-China.

Species:

- Streptoechites chinensis (Merr.) D.J.Middleton & Livsh.
