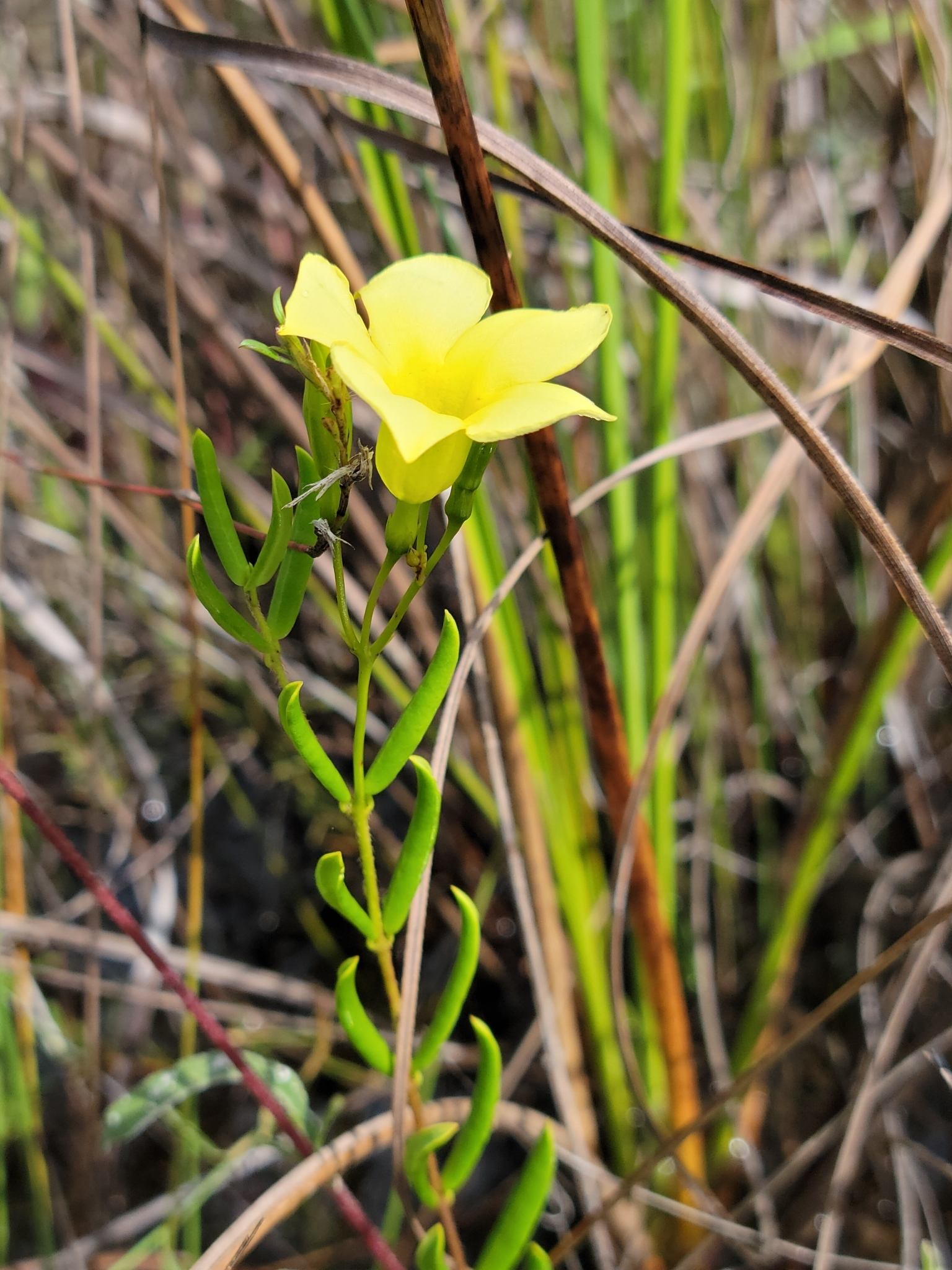
- Pineland golden trumpet

Scientific classification
- Kingdom: Plantae
- Clade: Tracheophytes
- Clade: Angiosperms
- Clade: Eudicots
- Clade: Asterids
- Order: Gentianales
- Family: Apocynaceae
- Subfamily: Apocynoideae
- Tribe: Echiteae
- Genus: Angadenia; Miers

Type species
- Angadenia berteroi (A.DC.) Miers

= Angadenia =

Genus of flowering plants

Angadenia is a genus of plants in the family Apocynaceae first described as a genus in 1878. It is native to Florida and the West Indies.

Species

1. Angadenia berteroi (A.DC.) Miers - Florida, Bahamas, Cuba, Hispaniola, Turks & Caicos Islands
2. Angadenia lindeniana (Müll.Arg.) Miers - Cuba, Hispaniola, Jamaica

formerly included

1. Angadenia almadensis, syn of Mandevilla hirsuta
2. Angadenia amazonica, syn of Odontadenia verrucosa
3. Angadenia cognata, syn of Odontadenia verrucosa
4. Angadenia coriacea, syn of Odontadenia geminata
5. Angadenia cururu, syn of Odontadenia puncticulosa
6. Angadenia elegans, syn of Odontadenia geminata
7. Angadenia elliptica, syn of Secondatia densiflora
8. Angadenia geminata, syn of Odontadenia geminata
9. Angadenia grandifolia, syn of Odontadenia puncticulosa
10. Angadenia hypoglauca, syn of Odontadenia hypoglauca
11. Angadenia jamaicensis, syn of Pentalinon luteum
12. Angadenia latifolia, syn of Odontadenia verrucosa
13. Angadenia majuscula, syn of Odontadenia hypoglauca
14. Angadenia nitida, syn of Odontadenia nitida
15. Angadenia pandurata, syn of Echites panduratus
16. Angadenia poeppigii, syn of Odontadenia geminata
17. Angadenia prieurei, syn of Mandevilla rugellosa
18. Angadenia pruinosa, syn of Secondatia floribunda
19. Angadenia reticulata, syn of Mandevilla scabra
20. Angadenia sprucei, syn of Odontadenia puncticulosa
21. Angadenia sylvestris, syn of Odontadenia macrantha
22. Angadenia valenzuelana, syn of Neobracea valenzuelana
