= Dipladenia =

The genus name Dipladenia or the common name dipladenia can refer to several flowering plants:

- Galactophora crassifolia, formerly Dipladenia calycina
- Mandevilla, several species
- Pentalinon luteum, yellow dipladenia, formerly Dipladenia flava
- Odontadenia macrantha, formerly Dipladenia brearleyana
- Rhabdadenia biflora, formerly Dipladenia billbergii
