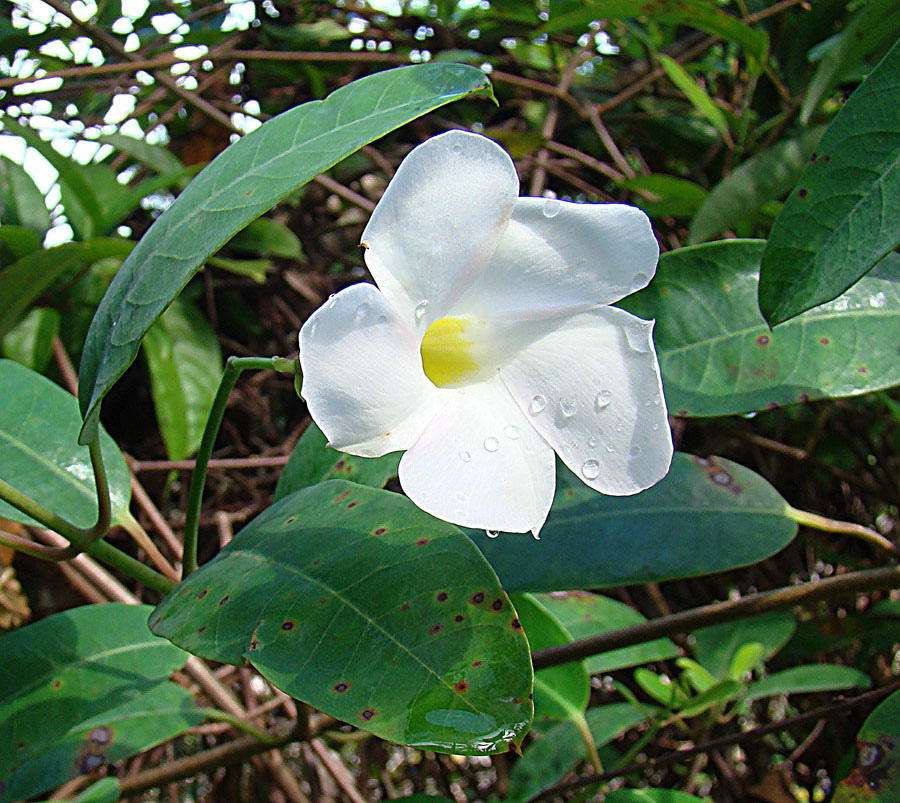
- Rhabdadenia biflora
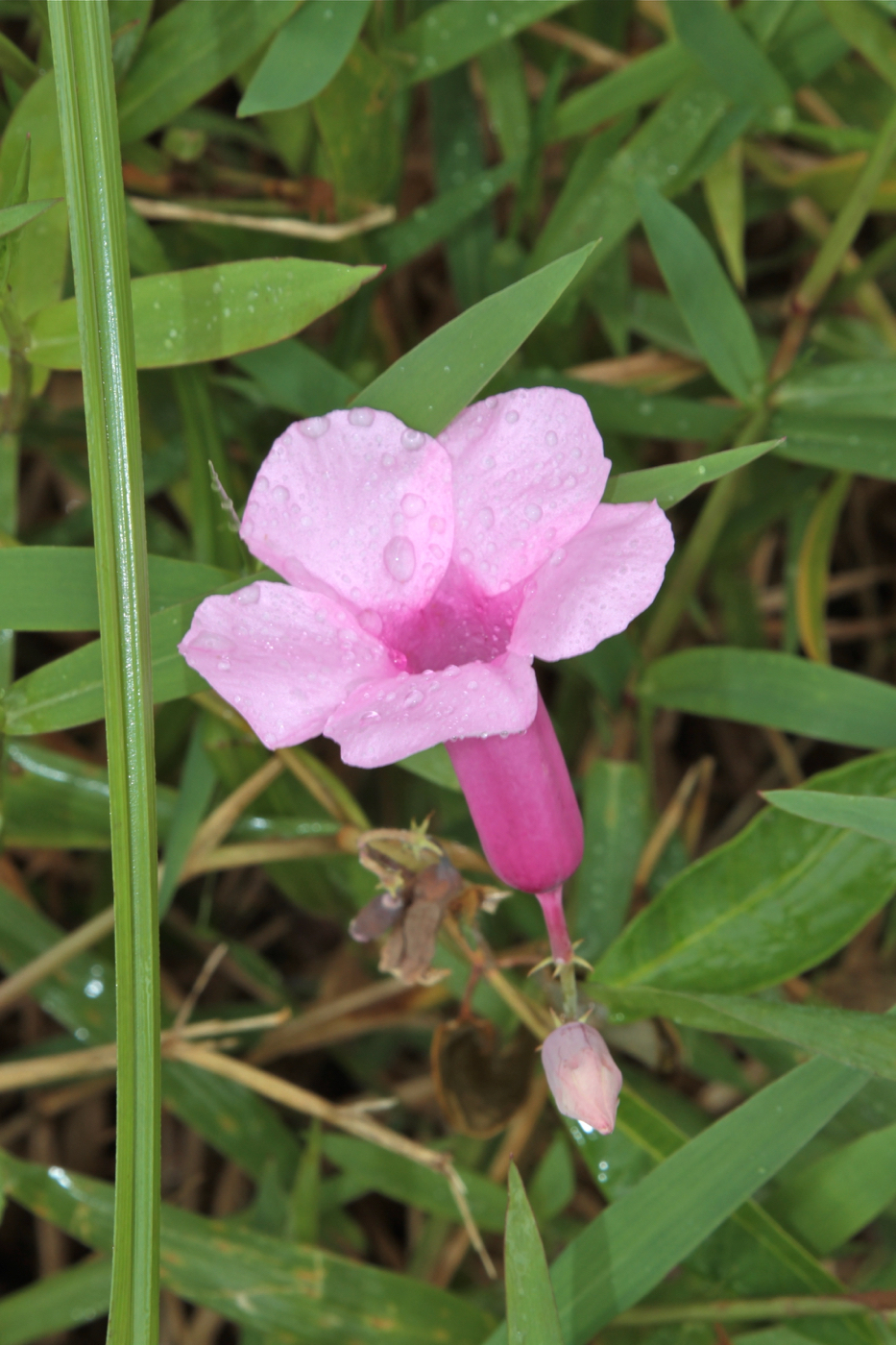
- Rhabdadenia madida

Scientific classification
- Kingdom: Plantae
- Clade: Tracheophytes
- Clade: Angiosperms
- Clade: Eudicots
- Clade: Asterids
- Order: Gentianales
- Family: Apocynaceae
- Subfamily: Apocynoideae
- Tribe: Rhabdadenieae; Pichon ex M.E.Endress
- Genus: Rhabdadenia; Müll.Arg.

= Rhabdadenia =

Genus of plants

Rhabdadenia is a genus of plant in the family Apocynaceae first described as a genus in 1860. It is native to South America, Central America, southern Mexico, the West Indies, and Florida.

Species

- Rhabdadenia biflora (Jacq.) Müll.Arg. - widespread from Florida and southern Mexico to Brazil
- Rhabdadenia madida (Vell.) Miers - South America from Colombia + the Guianas to Uruguay + Bolivia
- Rhabdadenia ragonesei Woodson - Mato Grosso do Sul, Paraguay, N Argentina

formerly included in the genus

1. Rhabdadenia barbata (Desv. ex Ham.) Miers = Pentalinon luteum (L.) B.F.Hansen & Wunderlin
2. Rhabdadenia berteroi (A.DC.) Müll.Arg. = Angadenia berteroi (A.DC.) Miers
3. Rhabdadenia campestris (Vell.) Miers = Mandevilla hirsuta (Rich.) K.Schum.
4. Rhabdadenia corallicola Small = Angadenia berteroi (A.DC.) Miers
5. Rhabdadenia cubensis Müll.Arg. = Angadenia berteroi (A.DC.) Miers
6. Rhabdadenia laxiflora Miers = Pentalinon luteum (L.) B.F.Hansen & Wunderlin
7. Rhabdadenia lindeniana Müll.Arg. = Angadenia lindeniana (Müll.Arg.) Miers
8. Rhabdadenia lucida Miers = Odontadenia nitida (Vahl) Müll.Arg.
9. Rhabdadenia polyneura Urb = Odontadenia polyneura (Urb.) Woodson
10. Rhabdadenia sagrae (A.DC.) Müll.Arg. ex Griseb. = Angadenia berteroi (A.DC.) Miers
11. Rhabdadenia wrightiana Müll.Arg. = Neobracea valenzuelana (A.Rich.) Urb.
