= U. lutea =

U. lutea may refer to:

- Urechites lutea, a vining plant
- Uvaria lutea, a custard apple
