= Nicotiana otophora =

Scientific classification
- Kingdom: Plantae
- Clade: Tracheophytes
- Clade: Angiosperms
- Clade: Eudicots
- Clade: Asterids
- Order: Solanales
- Family: Solanaceae
- Genus: Nicotiana
- Species: N. otophora

Binomial name
- Nicotiana otophora Griseb.

Synonyms
- Lehmannia otophora (Griseb.) Comes; Nicotiana friesii Dammer ex R.E.Fr.

Species of flowering plant

Nicotiana otophora is a perennial herbaceous plant in the family Solanaceae. It is a wild species of tobacco native to the Andes Mountains of Bolivia and Argentina.

== Tobacco taxonomy ==
Recent genetic evidence suggests the possibility that it is one of the parent species of the common domesticated tobacco (Nicotiana tabacum), which was hybridized along with the species Nicotiana sylvestris, and Nicotiana tomentosiformis.

The evidence for its parentage of Nicotiana tabacum is weaker at this time than it is for the other two species Nicotiana sylvestris, and Nicotiana tomentosiformis.
