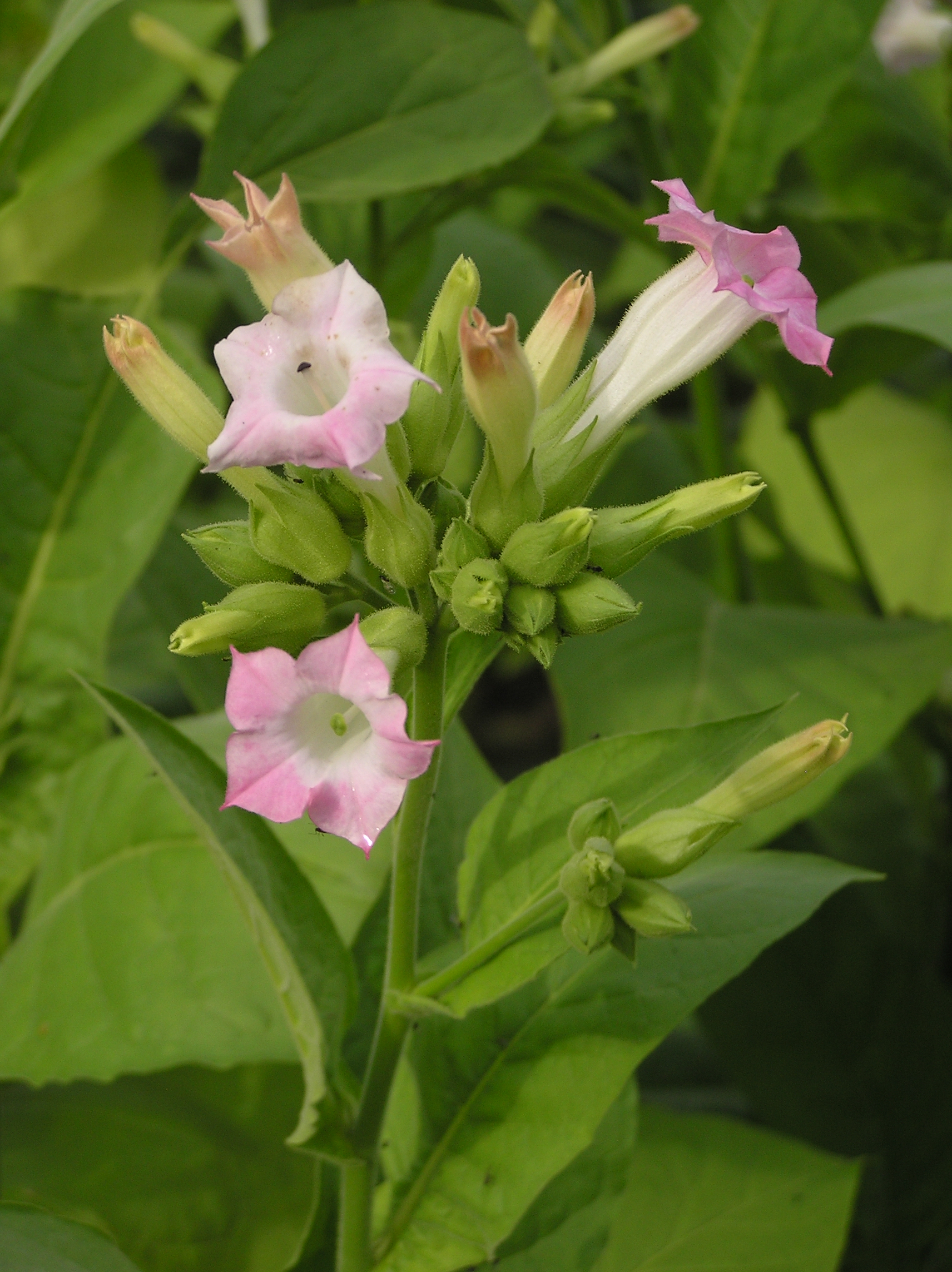

Scientific classification
- Kingdom: Plantae
- Clade: Tracheophytes
- Clade: Angiosperms
- Clade: Eudicots
- Clade: Asterids
- Order: Solanales
- Family: Solanaceae
- Genus: Nicotiana
- Species: N. tabacum

Binomial name
- Nicotiana tabacum L.

= Nicotiana tabacum =

Species of plant

Nicotiana tabacum, or cultivated tobacco, is an annually grown herbaceous plant of the genus Nicotiana. N. tabacum is the most commonly grown species in the genus Nicotiana, as the plant's leaves are commercially harvested to be processed into tobacco for human use. The plant is native to Bolivia, commonly grown throughout the world and often found in cultivation. It grows to heights between 1 and 2 metres (3.3 and 6.6 ft). Research is ongoing into its ancestry among wild Nicotiana species, but it is believed to be a hybrid of Nicotiana sylvestris, N. tomentosiformis, and possibly N. otophora.

== Description ==
It is an annual plant that grows 1 to 3 metres (3 to 10 feet) high and is sticky haired on all parts. The stems are thick and not very branched. The leaves can be over 50 centimetres (1 ft 8 in) long with the blades ovate to elliptical, or obovate, pointed towards the front and, at the base, run down the stem or are sessile, encompassing the stem.

The scented inflorescences are multi-branched panicles. The flower stalks are 5 to 15 millimetres (3/16 to 9/16 in) long. The calyx is 12 to 18 millimetres (1/2 to 11/16 in) and is covered with uneven 4 to 8 mm (3/16 to 5/16 in) narrow pointed calyx lobes shorter than the calyx tube. The crown is plate-shaped, the coronet is white, pink or red, the corolla tube greenish-cream, pink or red. The corolla tube has a total length of 3.5 to 4.5 cm (1 3/8 to 1 3/4 in) and is 3 to 5 mm (1/8 to 3/16 in) wide in the lower part and widens to 7 to 12 mm (1/4 to 1/2 in) in the upper part. The coronet is lobed or pentagonal. The stamens are designed unevenly and start below the center of the corolla tube. The anthers of the four longer stamens are close to the opening of the corolla tube or are slightly above it. The fifth stamen is significantly shorter than both longer pairs. The stamens have a length of 2.5 to 3.5 cm (1 to 1 3/8 in), significantly longer than the anthers, and are hairy at the base.

The fruit is a 1.5 to 2 cm (9/16 to 13/16 in) long capsule that is narrowly elliptical-to-egg-shaped. It can stand out over the calyx or be enclosed by it. The seeds are spherical or broadly elliptical, and are up to 0.5 mm (1/64 in) long with a wavy networked surface.

Almost every part of the plant except the seed contains nicotine, but the concentration is related to different factors such as species, type of land, culture and weather conditions. The concentration of nicotine increases with the age of the plant. Tobacco leaves contain 2-to-8% nicotine combined as malate or citrate. The distribution of the nicotine in the mature plant is widely variable: 64% of the total nicotine exists in the leaves, 18% in the stem, 13% in the root, and 5% in the flowers.

=== Phytochemistry ===
Natural tobacco polysaccharides, including cellulose, have been shown to be the primary precursors of acetaldehyde in tobacco smoke. The main polyphenols contained in the tobacco leaf are rutin and chlorogenic acid. Amino acids contained include glutamic acids, asparagine, glutamine, and γ-Aminobutyric acid.

Pyridine alkaloids are present in tobacco as free bases and salts. Nicotine accounts for 90–95% of the plant's pyridines with nornicotine and anatabine accounting for roughly 2.5% each. Pyridyl functional groups present in minute amounts include anabasine, myosmine, cotinine and 2, 3′-bipyridyl. Indole alkaloids are also present in leaves and stems which includes harmala alkaloids as well. Yohimbine, harmine, harmaline and ajmalicine occurs in descending order, yohimbine being highest.

The tobacco plant readily absorbs heavy metals from the surrounding soil and accumulates them in its leaves. These are readily absorbed into the user's body following smoke inhalation.

Tobacco also contains the following phytochemicals: glucosides (tabacinine, tabacine), 2,3,6-trimethyl-1,4-naphthoquinone, 2-methylquinone, 2-Naphthylamine, propionic acid, anthalin, anethole, acrolein, cembrene, choline, nicotelline, nicotianine, and pyrene.

==== Megastigmatrienone ====
Tobacco aroma is due to the presence of different volatile compounds; megastigmatrienone is the key flavor compound in tobacco. Megastigmatrienone is used as flavor in tobacco products as well.

Megastigmatrienone, a cyclohexenone, and a carotenoid-derived aromatic compound, produces spice notes associated with wine.

Megastigmatrienone is a metabolite of Brewer's yeast.

Megastigmatrienone, as Tabanone, is manufactured by Symrise as a perfume ingredient.

== Habitat and ecology ==
N. tabacum is a native of tropical and subtropical America, also appearing as a weed.

N. tabacum is sensitive to temperature, air, ground humidity and the type of land. Temperatures of 20–30 °C (68–86 °F) are best for adequate growth; an atmospheric humidity of 80-to-85% and soil without a high level of nitrogen are also optimal.

=== Parasites ===
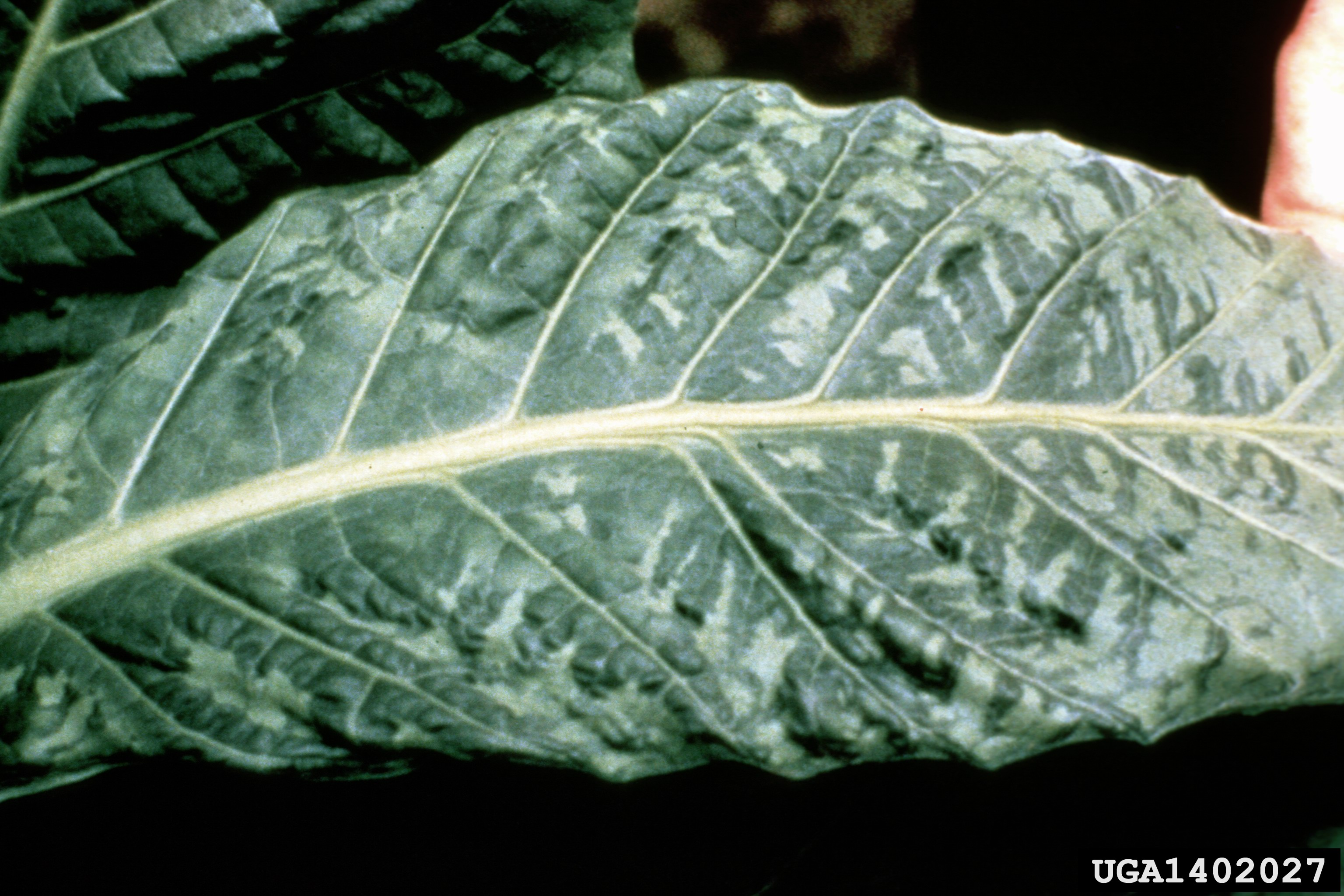
Tobacco mosaic virus (TMV) in a tobacco leaf

The potato tuber moth (Phthorimaea operculella) is an oligophagous insect that prefers to feed on plants of the family Solanaceae such as tobacco plants. Female P. operculella use the leaves to lay their eggs and the hatched larvae will eat away at the mesophyll of the leaf.

== Uses ==
The plant is native to the Caribbean, where the Taíno people were the first recorded peoples to use it and cultivate it. In 1560, Jean Nicot de Villemain, then French ambassador to Portugal, brought tobacco seeds and leaves as a "wonder drug" to the French court. In 1586 the botanist Jaques Dalechamps gave the plant the name of Herba nicotiana, which was also adopted by Linné. It was considered a decorative plant at first, then a panacea, before it became a common snuff and tobacco plant.

Tobacco arrived in Africa at the beginning of the 17th century. The leaf extract was a popular pest control method up to the beginning of the 20th century. In 1851, the Belgian chemist Jean Stas documented the use of tobacco extract as a murder poison. The Belgian count Hippolyte Visart de Bocarmé had poisoned his brother-in-law with tobacco leaf extract in order to acquire some urgently needed money. This was the first exact proof of alkaloids in forensic medicine.

It is now commercially cultivated worldwide. All parts of the plant contain nicotine, which can be extracted and used as an insecticide. The dried leaves can also be used; they remain effective for 6 months after drying. The juice of the leaves can be rubbed on the body as an insect repellent. The leaves can be dried and chewed as an intoxicant. The dried leaves are also used as snuff or are smoked. This is the main species that is used to make cigarettes, cigars, and other products. A drying oil is obtained from the seed.

Other varieties are cultivated as ornamental plants.

=== Curing and aging ===
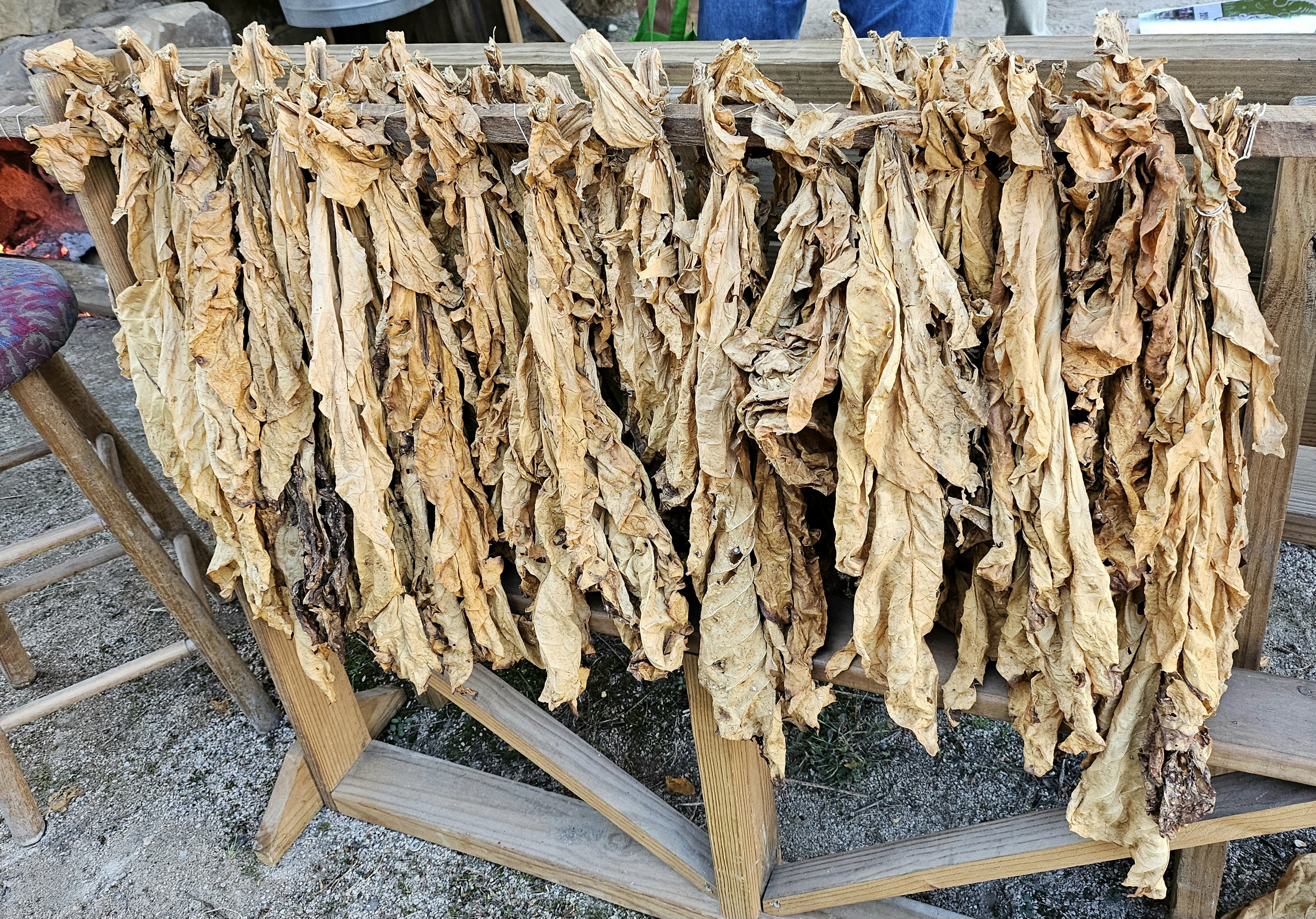
Dried tobacco at the North Carolina State Fair

After tobacco is harvested, it is cured (dried), and then aged to improve its flavor. There are four common methods of curing tobacco: air curing, fire curing, flue curing, and sun curing. The curing method used depends on the type of tobacco and its intended use. Air-cured tobacco is sheltered from wind and sun in a well-ventilated barn, where it air-dries for six to eight weeks. Air-cured tobacco is low in sugar, which gives the tobacco smoke a light, sweet flavour, and high in nicotine. Cigar and burley tobaccos are air-cured.

In fire curing, smoke from a low-burning fire on the barn floor permeates the leaves. This gives the leaves a distinctive smoky aroma and flavor. Fire curing takes three-to-ten weeks and produces a tobacco low in sugar and high in nicotine. Pipe tobacco, chewing tobacco, and snuff are fire-cured.

Flue-cured tobacco is kept in an enclosed barn heated by flues (pipes) of hot air, but the tobacco is not directly exposed to smoke. This method produces cigarette tobacco that is high in sugar and has medium-to-high levels of nicotine. It is the fastest method of curing, requiring about a week. Virginia tobacco that has been flue-cured is also called bright tobacco, because flue curing turns its leaves gold, orange, or yellow.

Sun-cured tobacco dries uncovered in the sun. This method is used in Greece, Turkey, and other Mediterranean countries to produce oriental tobacco. Sun-cured tobacco is low in sugar and nicotine and is used in cigarettes.

Once the tobacco is cured, workers tie it into small bundles of about 20 leaves, called hands, or use a machine to make large blocks, called bales. The hands or bales are aged for one to three years to improve flavor and reduce bitterness.

=== Ethnomedicinal uses ===
The regions that have histories of use of the plant include:

- Brazil: The leaf juice is taken orally to induce vomiting and narcosis.
- Colombia: Fresh leaf is used as poultice over boils and infected wounds; the leaves are crushed with oil from palms and used as hair treatment to prevent baldness.
- Cuba: Extract of the leaf is taken orally to treat dysmenorrhea.
- East Africa: Dried leaves of Nicotiana tabacum and Securinega virosa are mixed into a paste and used externally to destroy worms in sores.
- Ecuador: Leaf juice is used for indisposition, chills and snake bites and to treat pulmonary ailments.
- Fiji: Fresh root is taken orally for asthma and indigestion; fresh root is applied ophthalmically as drops for bloodshot eyes and other problems; seed is taken orally for rheumatism and to treat hoarseness.
- Guatemala: Leaves are applied externally by adults for myiasis, headache and wounds; hot water extract of the dried leaf is applied externally for ring worms, fungal diseases of the n, wounds, ulcers, bruises, sores, mouth lesions, stomatitis and mucosa; leaf is orally taken for kidney diseases.
- Haiti: Decoction of dried leaf is taken orally for bronchitis and pneumonia.
- Hong Kong: Fresh leaves are mashed and combined with vegetable oil to create a potion that is applied to injuries for it to heal faster. This practice is also apparent in other places in China.
- Iran: Infusion of the dried leaf is applied externally as an insect repellent; ointments made from crushed leaves are used for baldness, dermatitis and infectious ulceration and as a pediculicide.
- Mexico (south-eastern): Among the ancient Maya, Nicotiana was considered a sacred plant, closely associated with deities of earth and sky, and used for both visionary and therapeutic ends. The contemporary Tzeltal and Tzotzil Maya of Highland Chiapas (Mexico) are bearers of this ethnobotanical inheritance, preserving a rich and varied tradition of Nicotiana use and folklore. The entire tobacco plant is viewed as a primordial medicine and a powerful botanical "helper" or "protector". Depending on the condition to be treated, whole Nicotiana leaves are used alone or in combination with other herbs in the preparation of various medicinal plasters and teas. In its most common form, fresh or green leaves are ground with slaked lime to produce an intoxicating oral snuff that serves as both a protective and therapeutic agent.
- United States: Extract of N. tabacum is taken orally to treat tiredness, ward off diseases, and quiet fear.
- Tanzania: Leaves of Nicotiana tabacum are placed in the vagina to stimulate labor.
- Zimbabwe: Leaves or root of the plant are infused and taken by mouth for asthma and other respiratory problems. Leaves and roots are also rubbed against warts and wounds as ointment.

== Development and social impact ==
John Rolfe of Virginia used this species of tobacco to break the Spanish monopoly on tobacco in 1612. He did so by obtaining Nicotiana tabacum - the coveted plant he had designs to replace Nicotiana rustica with. Up until 1612, Nicotiana rustica was Virginia's only tobacco crop, and was found by Englishmen to be too bitter for enjoyment. Rolfe, by successfully planting, maintaining, and curing Nicotiana tabacum until sale (by removing all superfluous leaves and applying as little water as possible during curing), made Virginia a potential competitor with Spain's colonies.

This transitioned the colony to a cash-crop focused one, monocropping tobacco by 1613, the year the first shipment (of 4 barrels) arrived in London. By 1617, the quality of Virginia tobacco had made it the gold standard in European markets, which had become insatiable- 20,000lbs of tobacco was exported there that year. These exports grew exponentially, doubling to 40,000lbs the following year (the year the first enslaved Africans arrive in America), and reaching 60,000lbs by 1620.

The money obtained from tobacco exports was used, in turn, to fund the purchasing of more European indentured servants and especially enslaved Africans to fulfill the rising labor demand. In the 17th century, 75% of all colonists in Virginia had come as servants, indentured (with a term of 4 to 7 years of service) or Africans in perpetuity (for life), the latter being preferred as they were cheaper sources of labor:

If it were not for the accidental negroes [brought by Treasurer], I were not able to raise one pound of tobacco this year for the defrayment of any public work….These slaves are the most proper and cheap instruments for this plantation that can be.

— Beth Austin, Hampton History Museum, page 11

Soil degradation also resulted and continues to result from tobacco growing in general and through tobacco monocropping/monoculture specifically.

== Gallery ==
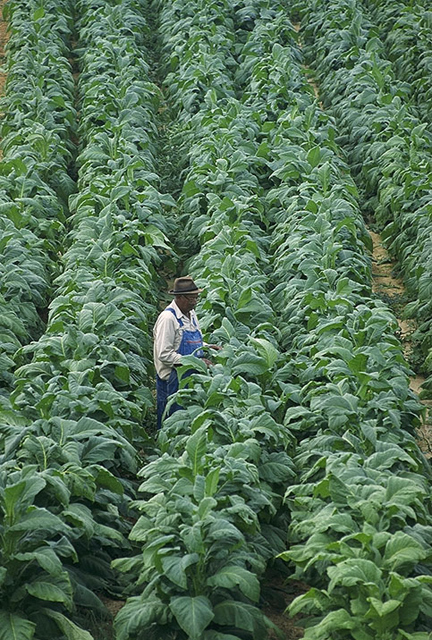

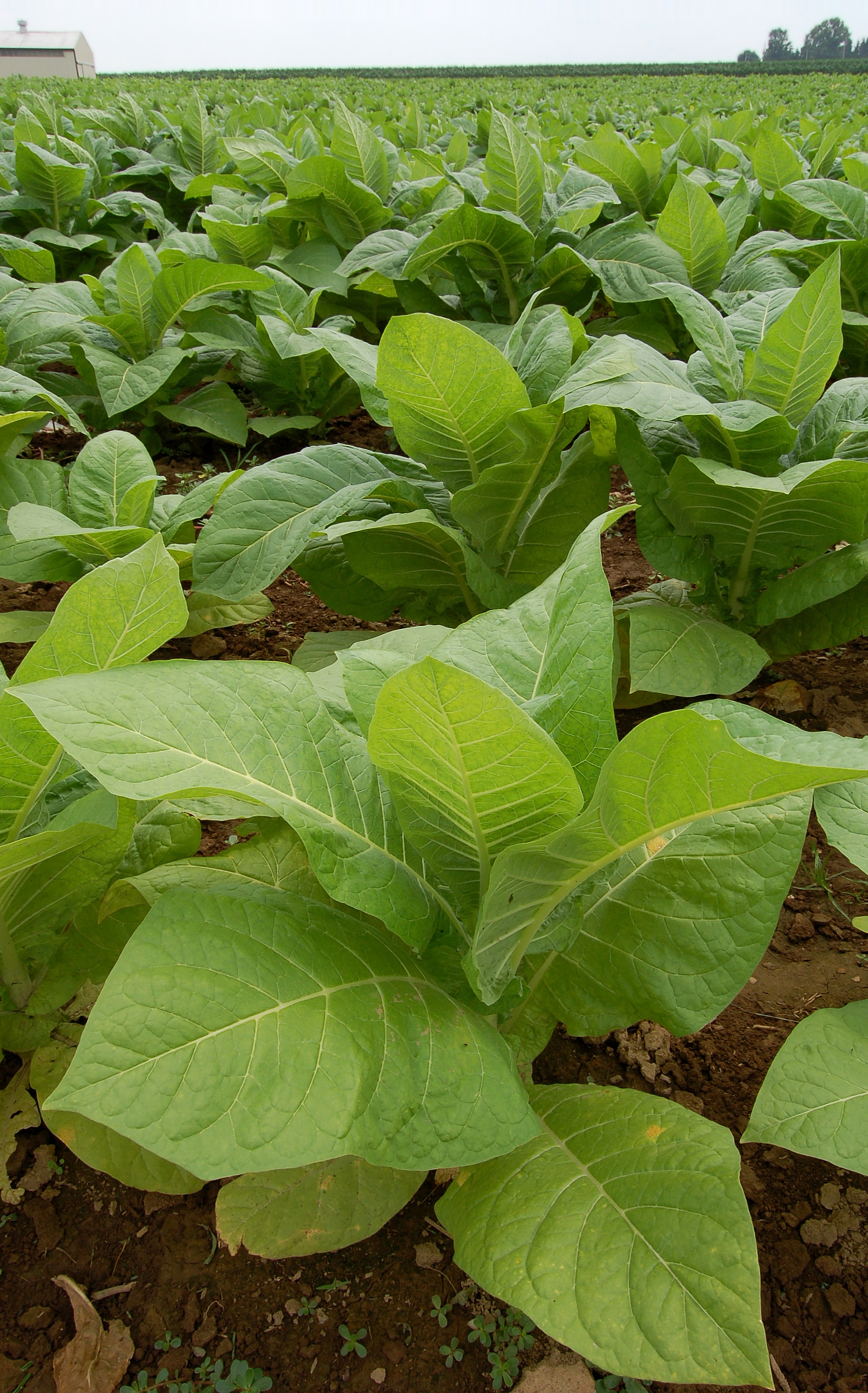

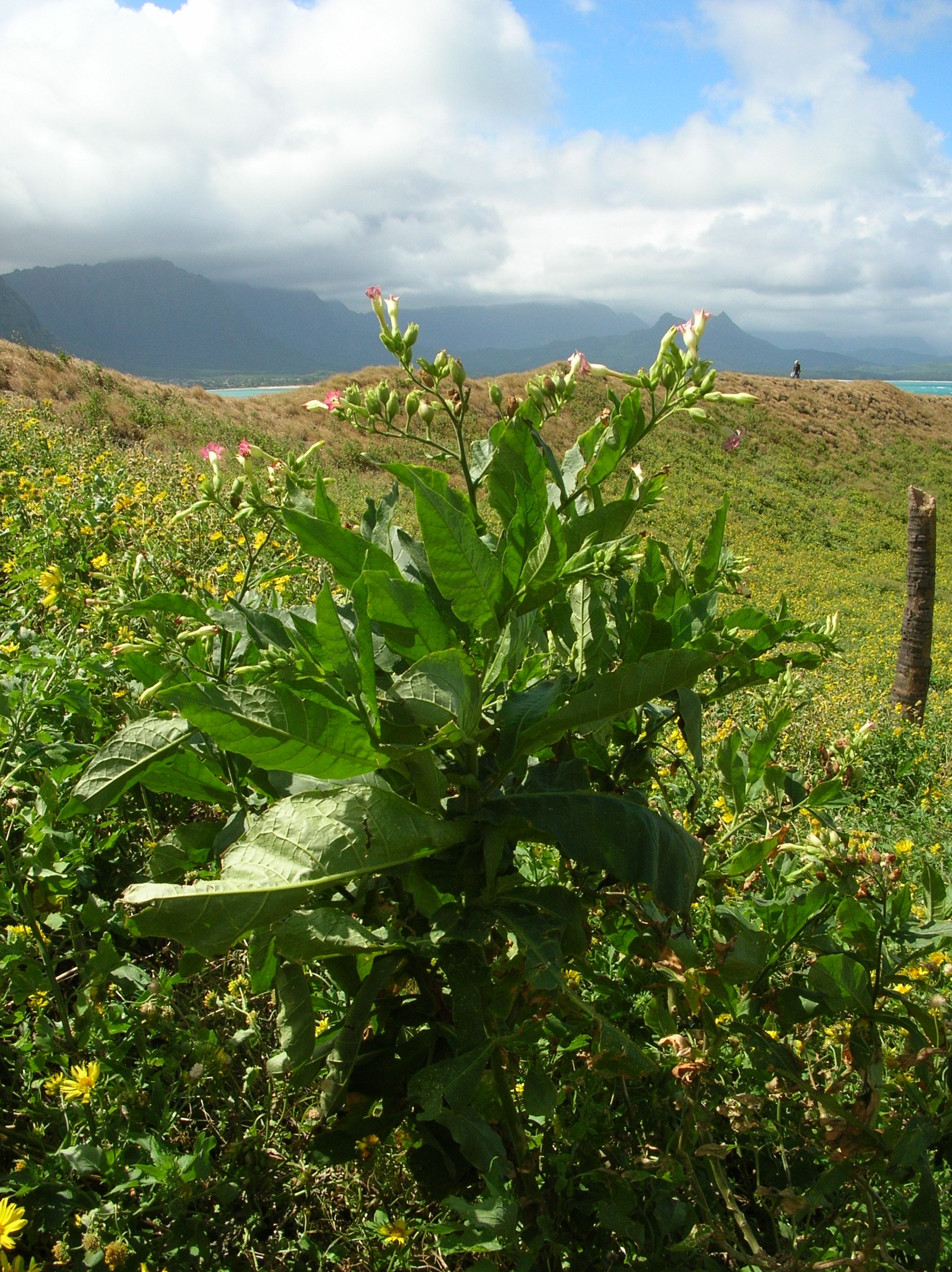

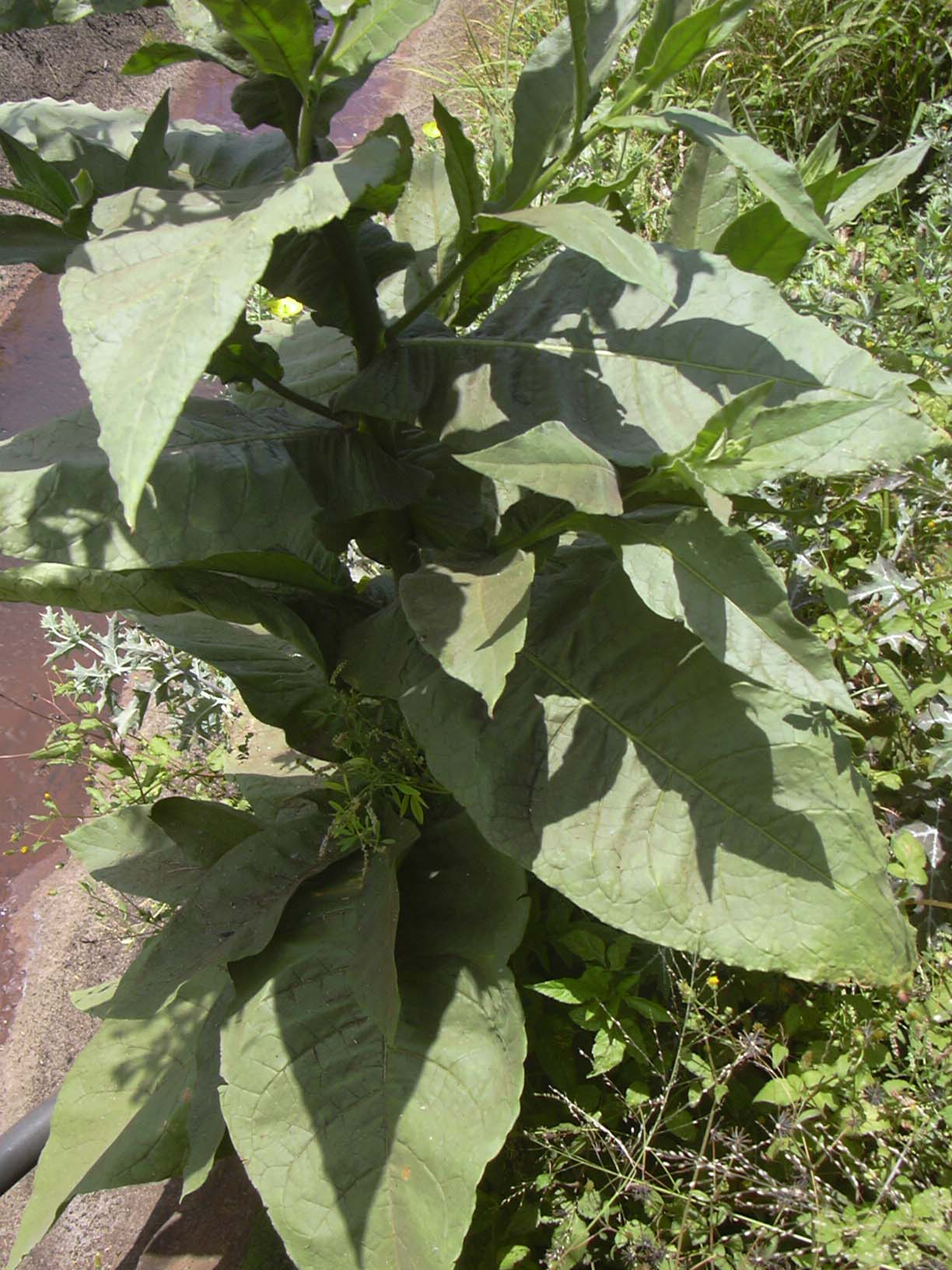

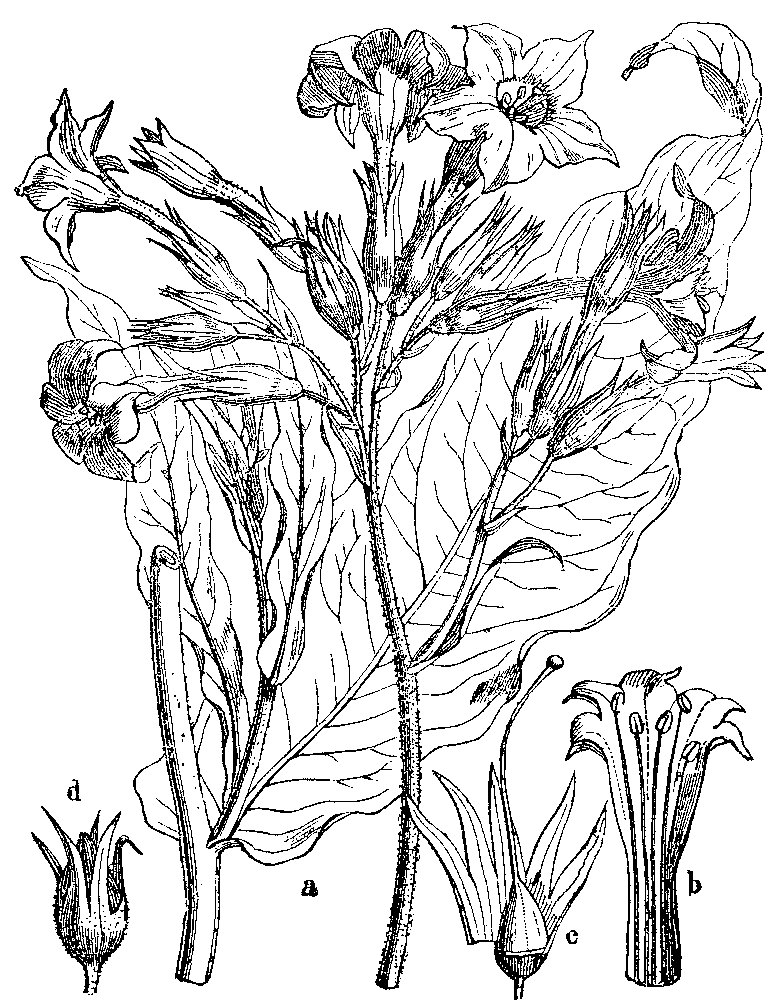

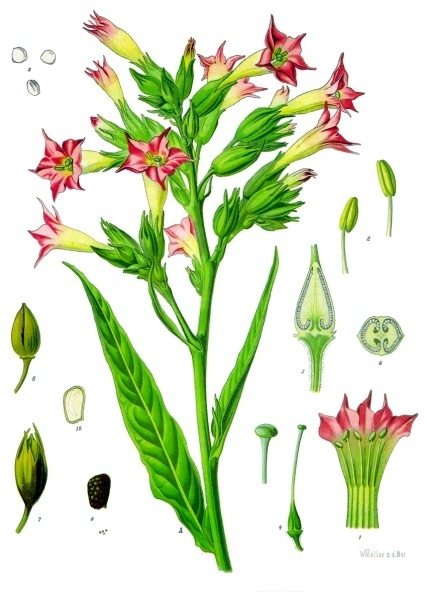

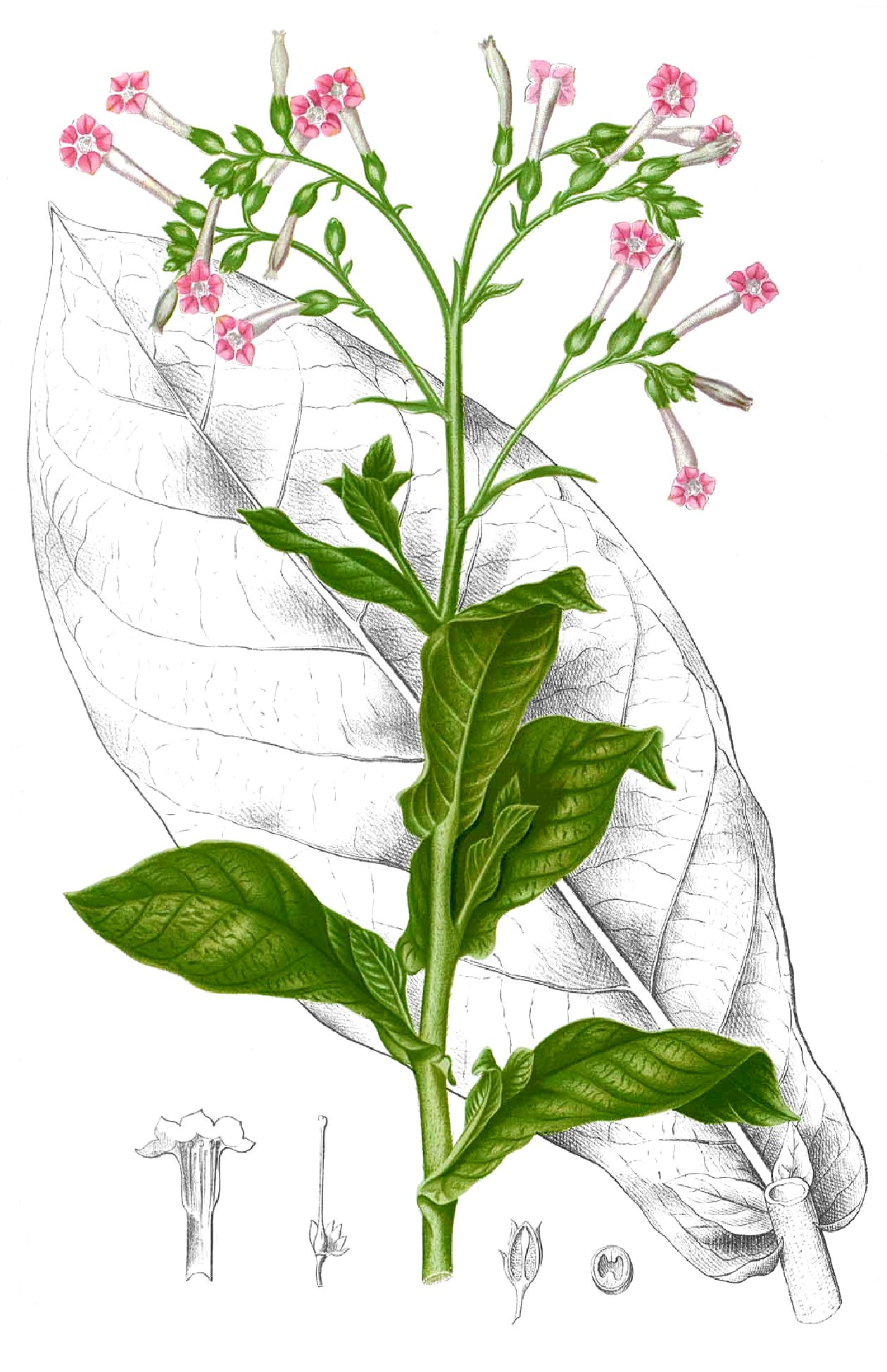

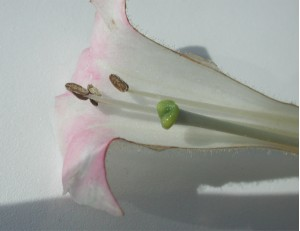

== See also ==
- Nicotiana rustica
- Types of tobacco
