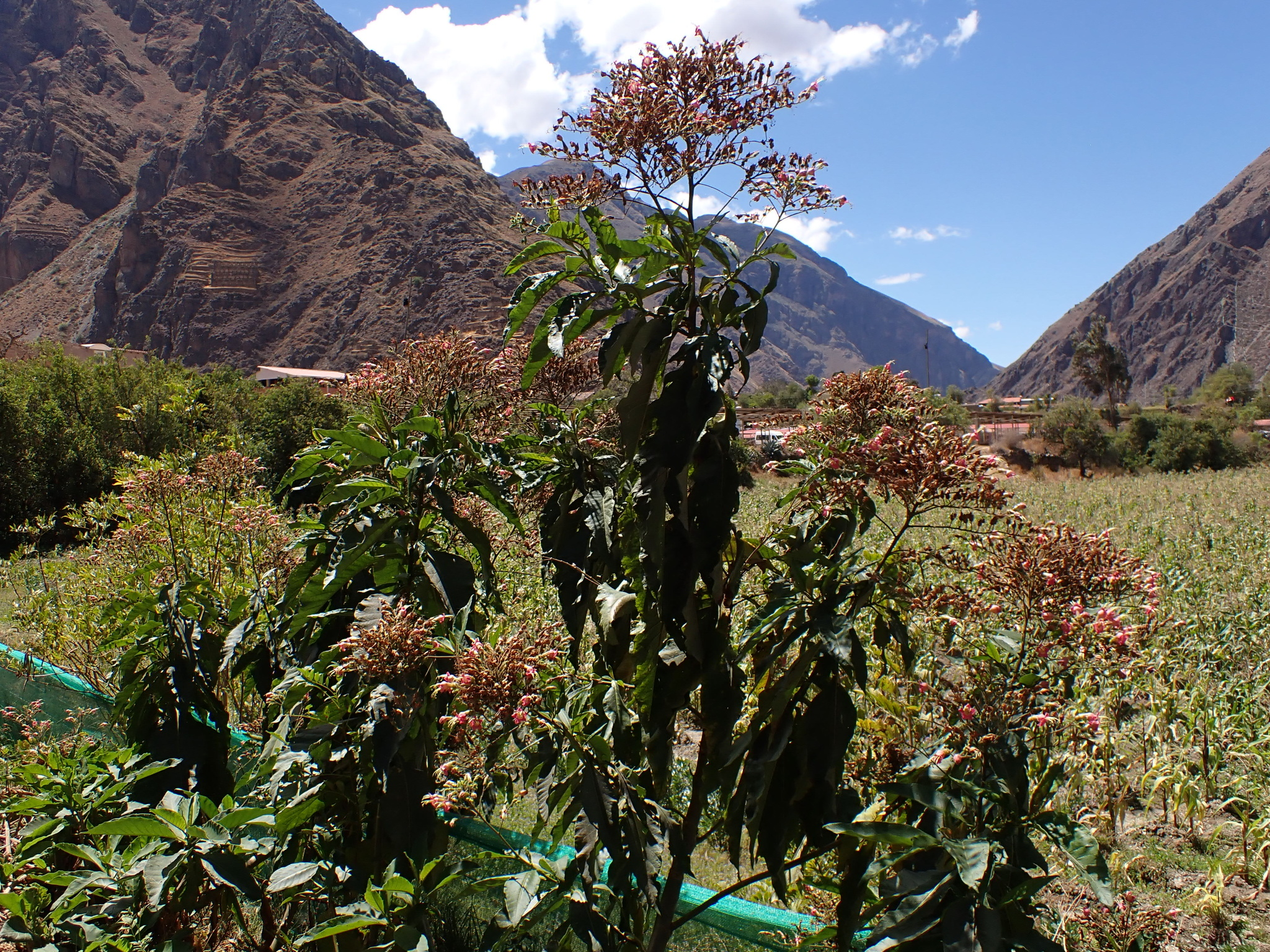
- In Peru

Scientific classification
- Kingdom: Plantae
- Clade: Tracheophytes
- Clade: Angiosperms
- Clade: Eudicots
- Clade: Asterids
- Order: Solanales
- Family: Solanaceae
- Genus: Nicotiana
- Species: N. tomentosiformis

Binomial name
- Nicotiana tomentosiformis L.

= Nicotiana tomentosiformis =

Species of flowering plant

Nicotiana tomentosiformis is a perennial herbaceous plant. It is a wild species of tobacco native to the Yungas Valley region in the eastern piedmont of the Andes Mountains, primarily in Bolivia.

Recent genetic evidence suggests it is one of the parent species of the common domesticated tobacco (Nicotiana tabacum), which was hybridized along with the species Nicotiana sylvestris, and possibly Nicotiana otophora
