= Rhabdadenia biflora =

- Leafy stem with flowers

Scientific classification
- Kingdom: Plantae
- Clade: Tracheophytes
- Clade: Angiosperms
- Clade: Eudicots
- Clade: Asterids
- Order: Gentianales
- Family: Apocynaceae
- Genus: Rhabdadenia
- Species: R. biflora

Binomial name
- Rhabdadenia biflora (Jacq.) Müll.Arg.

Synonyms
- List: Echites biflorus Jacq.; Apocynum cordatum Mill.; Apocynum nervosum Mill.; Dipladenia billbergii Beurl.; Echites biflorus Ehrenb. ex Schltdl.; Echites bilbergii Beurl.; Echites ehrenbergii Schltdl.; Echites paludosus Vahl; Exothostemon paludosus (Vahl) G.Don; Rhabdadenia cordata Miers; Rhabdadenia ehrenbergii (Schltdl.) Müll.Arg. ex Griseb.; Rhabdadenia macrantha Donn.Sm.; Rhabdadenia nervosa (Mill.) Miers; Rhabdadenia paludosa (Vahl) Miers

Species of plant

Dissected flower's yellow throat

Forming thicket at mangrove edge

Rhabdadenia biflora, often known as mangrove vine, rubbervine and similar names, is a climbing plant species native to Tropical America, including Florida in the USA. It belongs to the family Apocynaceae.

== Description ==
Rhabdadenia biflora is recognized mainly by its presence in tropical American fresh- and salt-water swamps, especially mangrove swamps, and by its relatively large, dazzlingly white blossoms on climbing stems with glossy green leaves. Beyond that, here are other key features:

- It is a mostly hairless liana or climbing shrub with leaves arising in pairs opposite one another; parts when injured issue milky sap.
- Leaves with petioles up to 18 mm (1/2 in) long and blades up to 11.2 cm × 4.2 cm (4 1/2 in × 1 1/2 in) vary in size greatly.
- Inflorescences have 1-3 flowers, sometimes 5, on peduncles up to 8.4 cm (3 1/2 in) long, with pedicels up to 21 mm (13/16 in) long. Sepals up to 11 mm × 3.6 mm (7/16 in × 1/8 in) in size subtend funnel-shaped corollas up to 7 cm (2 3/4 in) long; these are mostly are white, though sometimes with a rose or yellowish hue, and the interior throat is yellow.
- Follicle-type fruits are up to 18.2 cm × 0.45 cm (7 3/16 in × 3/16 in), and hairless. Each seed is topped with a tuft of cream-colored, silky hairs, the "coma," up to 4.1 cm (1 5/8 in) long.

Despite such details, Rhabdadenia biflora is so morphologically similar to Rhabdadenia ragonesei and Rhabdadenia madida, and all are so variable with sometimes overlapping features that, without magnification, distinguishing which species you have can be hard; microscopic leaf differences clearly separate the species.

== Distribution ==
In the USA, Rhabdadenia biflora occurs only in the state of Florida. In Mexico and Central America, it is found along the Gulf of Mexico and Caribbean coasts, and throughout the Caribbean. In southern Central America also it is on the Pacific side. In northern South America it occurs in coastal areas adjacent to both the Pacific and Atlantic Oceans, and sometimes into the interior lowlands.

== Habitat ==
Rhabdadenia biflora inhabits mangrove forest and associated vegetation types at elevations up to 7 m (23 ft) above sea level.

== Uses by humans ==
=== In traditional medicine ===
In The Guianas Rhabdadenia biflora is used in combination with black mangrove and cultivated tobacco as a remedy for stings of the stingray. Leaves are applied to the skin to treat ulcers. Formerly it was used as a purgative. In coastal Brazil, the plant's white sap, or latex, is used to treat cataracts.

This use for cataracts may be an instance of the doctrine of signatures, an ancient biomedicinal theory now regarded as pseudoscience. In this case the doctrine suggests that the plant's white sap indicates it as a good treatment for the milky covering of eyes with cataracts. The white sap of Mangrove Vine is said to be poisonous.

=== In gardening ===
Rhabdadenia biflora is recommended as a trellis plant, and can be grown in containers. It may need substantial water as it is becoming established, but then is fairly drought tolerant. It needs full to partial sunlight. It is tolerant of salty wind, but not to inundation by salty or brackish water.

=== In basket weaving ===
In Colombia, fibers are extracted from the pith of Rhabdadenia biflora for basket weaving.

== Taxonomy ==
In 1760 when Nikolaus Joseph von Jacquin formally described and named Rhabdadenia biflora under the basionym of Echites biflorus, he was describing plants which he and gardener Richard van de Schot collected during an expedition departing in 1755 for the Caribbean, and returning, after diseases and political problems, in 1759. The trip had been sponsored by Francis I, Holy Roman Emperor, to collect "curiosities" for his palace's natural history collections.

=== Etymology ===
The origin of the genus name Rhabdadenia is uncertain, though it appears to be based on the Greek rhabdos, meaning "rod," and aden, meaning "gland."

The species name biflora is constructed of the Latin bi, meaning "two or twice," with the Latin -flora referring to Flora the "goddess of flowers," and by extension flowers and flowery things.
