= Henry de Bury =

Henry Robert Visart de Bury et de Bocarmé
- Born: 11 June 1872; Constance, Germany
- Died: 31 July 1958 (aged 86); Quebec City, Quebec
- Military career
- Allegiance: Canada British
- Branch: Royal Regiment of Artillery
- Service years: 1892–1913
- Rank: Colonel (ret'd) Count
- Commands: Director of Canadian Ordnance Services, France.
- Awards: CBE,
- Other work: professor, Director of Canadian Ordnance Services

Colonel Count Henry Robert Visart de Bury et de Bocarmé, CBE (11 June 1872, in Constance, Germany – 31 July 1958, in Montreal) was a career officer in the British and Canadian army, member of the Belgian nobility, academic, and Director of Canadian Ordnance Services, France.

== Education ==
De Bury was educated in Stonyhurst College, England. He studied at the Royal Military College of Canada, Kingston, Ontario Canada, class of 1892, student #268 where he later taught from 1905 to 1910.

== Family ==
He and his wife Agnes Mary Robertson (1870-1962), had two daughters Valérie (born 1899) and Joan (born 1905). The couple lived in Artillery Park, Quebec City.

== Military service ==
De Bury was commissioned into the British Army as a second lieutenant in the Royal Artillery on 4 July 1892, and promoted to lieutenant on 4 July 1895. He was promoted to captain on 1 February 1900, when serving with the Royal Garrison Artillery, and was stationed in Saint Lucia in 1901, where he was Garrison Adjutant from 1902-05.

He was Professor of Mathematics at The Royal Military College of Canada in Kingston, Ontario, from 1905–10, gazetted a brevet major in 1910, and was Aide-de-camp to the Lieutenant Governor of Manitoba, 1912-16.

On 19 November 1910, he received Royal Licence to use the title of Count in the British Realms.

He retired from the Royal Regiment of Artillery in 1911. He joined the Royal Canadian Ordnance Corps in 1911. He was a Lieutenant-Colonel commanding a Canadian Field Artillery Brigade, Expeditionary Force during the First World War, and later became director of Canadian ordnance service in France during the First World War. He served as Director of Dominion Arsenals from 1920 to 1936. In 1936, he retired as a colonel. He rejoined the army in 1940 and served as district ordnance officer for the duration of the Second World War and retired in 1946. He was awarded a CBE. He was elected president of Royal Military College Club of Canada in 1913.

== Family ==
The title of count had been granted to Colonel Louis-François Visart, lord of Bury and Bocarmé, by the Empress Maria-Theresa on 5 September 1753.

The title was later confirmed (1822) and has remained in the family ever since.

Bury, Péruwelz, Belgium

The Bury estates are in the municipality of Péruwelz, province of Hainaut, Wallonia, Belgium.

Henry was the eldest son and heir of Count Robert Visart de Bury de Bocarmé (1845-1907), a Belgian nobleman, representative descendant of a distinguished family, who emigrated to Canada. His grandfather however, was the convicted and executed murderer Hippolyte Visart de Bocarmé (1818-1851).

Count Robert Visart de Bury, of Bury in Péruwelz, Belgium and Saint John, New Brunswick, a civil engineer, studied at the Episcopal College of Mecheln, in Belgium, at the University of Zurich and at the Polytechnic School of Stuttgart in Württemberg. He was employed as a civil engineer by the Orléans Railway Company and by the Government of Württemberg in the survey of the Black Forest Railway. He married Miss Simonds of Saint John, New Brunswick. The couple came to New Brunswick in 1873, and lived in Portland, New Brunswick and Bury, Belgium. He served as Belgian Consul for the Province of New Brunswick and Consular Agent for France at St. John. He served as a member of the Town Council of Portland.

== Literature ==
=== Military service ===
- 4237 Dr. Adrian Preston & Peter Dennis (Edited) Swords and Covenants Rowman And Littlefield, London. Croom Helm. 1976.
- H16511 Dr. Richard Arthur Preston To Serve Canada: A History of the Royal Military College of Canada 1997 Toronto, University of Toronto Press, 1969.
- H16511 Dr. Richard Arthur Preston Canada's RMC - A History of Royal Military College Second Edition 1982
- H16511 Dr. Richard Preston R.M.C. and Kingston: The effect of imperial and military influences on a Canadian community 1968
- H1877 R. Guy C. Smith (editor) As You Were! Ex-Cadets Remember. In 2 Volumes. Volume I: 1876-1918. Volume II: 1919-1984. Royal Military College. [Kingston]. The R.M.C. Club of Canada. 1984

=== Family ===
- Louis LABARRE, Le Drame du château de Bury, Mons, 1851
- Procès du comte et de la comtesse de Bocarmé devant la Cour d'assises du Hainaut (1851), Mons, Leroux, 1851.
- Frédéric THOMAS, Petites causes célèbres du jour. Tome 12, 1855
- Pierre BOUCHARDON, Le crime du château de Bitremont, Paris, A. Michel, 1925,
- Henry SOUMAGNE, Le Seigneur de Bury, Brussels, Larcier, 1946.
- Alfred GALLEZ, Le sire de Bitremont, affaire de Bocarmé, Brussels, P. de Méyère, 1959.
- Oscar COOMANS DE BRACHÈNE, État présent de la noblesse belge, Annuaire 2000, Brussels, 2000
- Robert WENNIG, Back to the roots of modern analytical toxicology: Jean Servais Stas and the Bocarmé murder case, in: Drug Test Anal, John Wiley & Sons, April 2009.
- Douglas DE CONINCK, Visart de Bocarmé, in: De Morgen, 14 januari 2012.
