= Alphonse Michaux =

Belgian coin engraver and medalist

Alphonse Michaux (1860–1928) was a Belgian coin engraver and medalist.

Michaux was born in Brussels on 15 December 1860. He was the son of Belgian engraver Robert Michaux (1824–1901), and as a young man studied at the Academy of Fine Arts in Brussels.

== Career ==
Michaux was appointed chief engraver of the Brussels Mint (La Monnaie de Bruxelles) in 1895. As a coin designer, he is best known for engraving dies for a series of Belgian coins with a distinctive hole in the center. These coins started circulation in 1901 when 5 and 10 centimes coins were released.

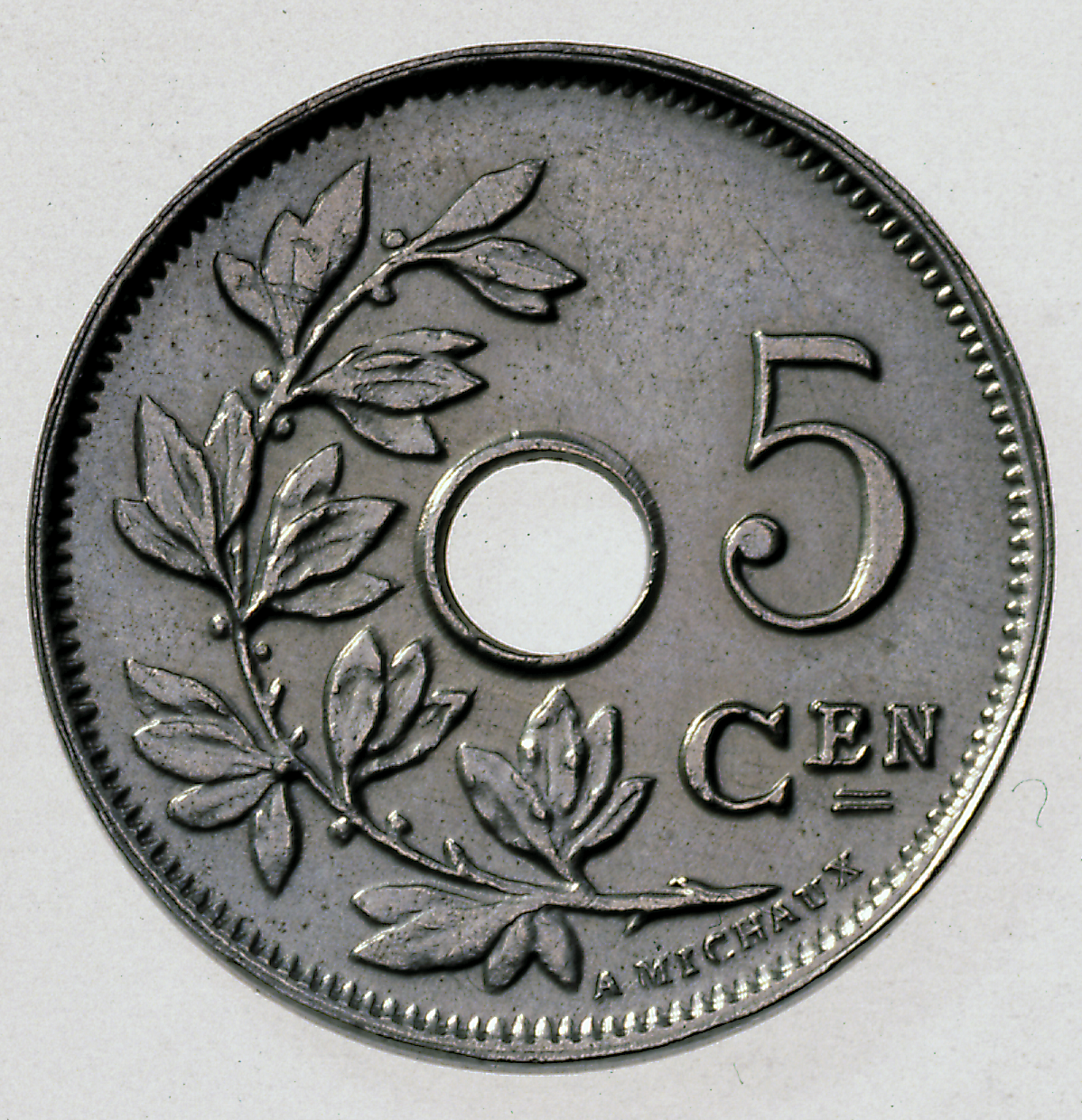
5 Centimes Coin designed by Michaux

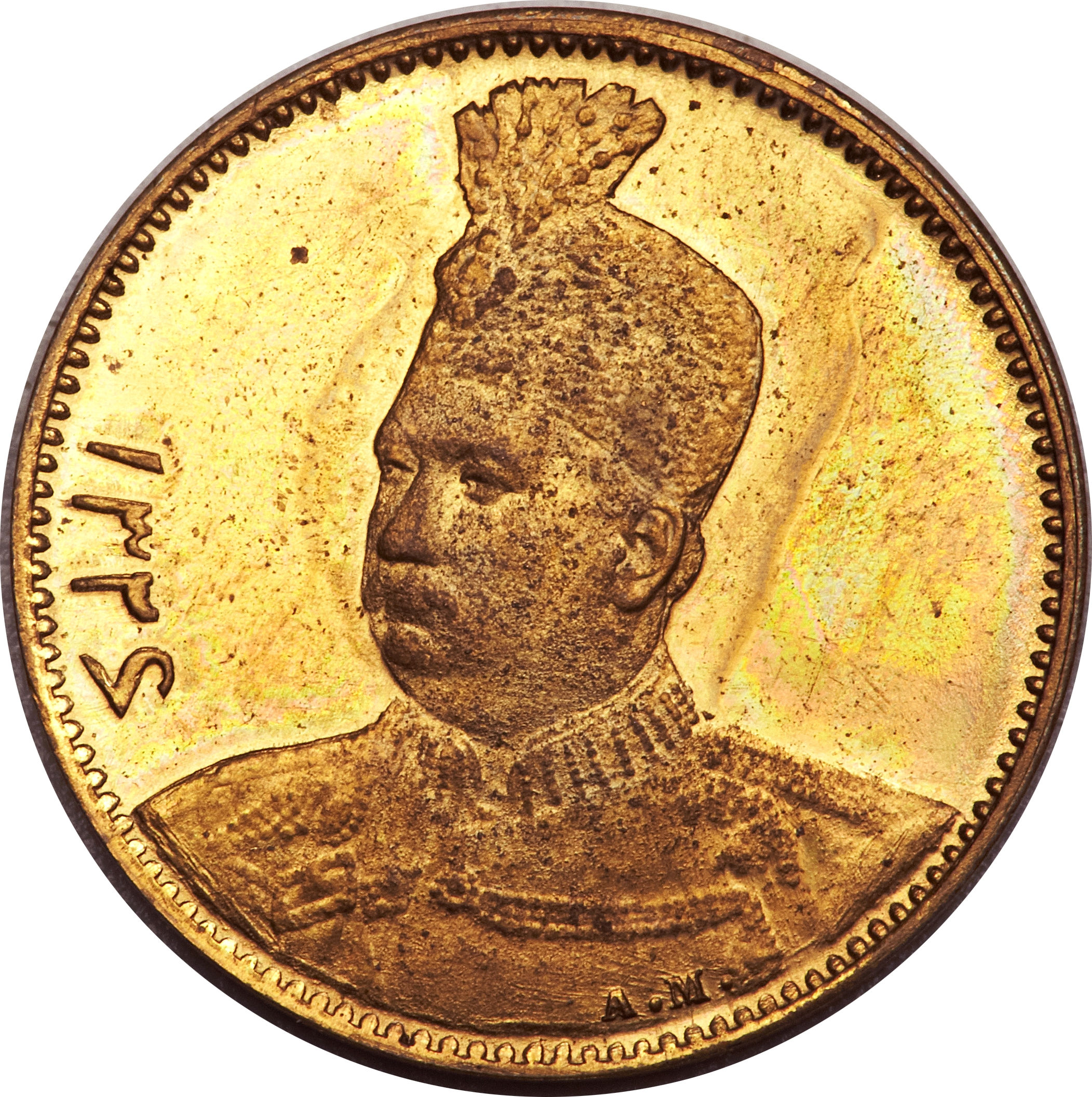
Iranian Half Toman gold coin of Mohammad Ali Qajar designed by Michaux. The A. M. can be seen on king's breast.

The 25 centimes coin was first released in 1908. Michaux also engraved coins for Luxembourg, Iran, Romania, and Colombia. These coins are signed either "A. Michaux" or "A.M." on the obverse.

=== Medal designs ===
Michaux's medals include:

- 1888 – Ville de Tournai Halle aux Draps Exposition 1888
- 1891- Jean-Servais Stas Jubilaire (50 years)
- 1894 – Jeton (28 mm) for Exposition Universelle d'Anvers
- 1895 – Protection of Childhood
- 1900 – Shah of Iran’s visit to the Brussels Mint
- 1901 – 50th Anniversary of the Marriage of the Grand Duke of Luxembourg
- 1902 – Birth of the 20th Century
- 1903 – Centenary of the College of Luxembourg
- 1905 – Jeton (30 mm) for Exposition Universelle de Liège
- 1905 – Centenary of the Republic of Haiti
- 1906 – 40th Anniversary of the Reign of Carol I of Romania
- 1907 – Royal Numismatic Society of Belgium
- 1908 – Hommage for Ch. Van Der Beken
- 1910 – Jeton (30 mm) for visitors to the Brussels Mint (Monnaie de Bruxelles – Aujourd’hui)
- 1912 – Art medal/pendant La Nage St. Gilles
- Circa 1914 – Albert Roi des Belges, Defenseur de Notre Territoire Nieuport Octobre 1914, WWI
- 1916 - Elisabeth, Reine des Belges
- Circa 1918 - WWI Memorial Medal/pendant A Nos Braves 1914 – 1918 La Saint Gilloise
- 1926 - Agriculture Exposition, Esschen
- Agriculture Award medal – Dairy Maid with Cow
