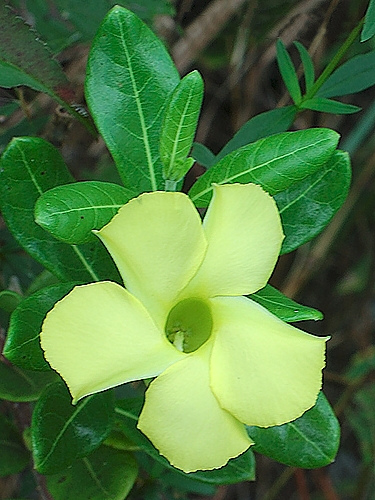
- Pentalinon luteum

Scientific classification
- Kingdom: Plantae
- Clade: Tracheophytes
- Clade: Angiosperms
- Clade: Eudicots
- Clade: Asterids
- Order: Gentianales
- Family: Apocynaceae
- Subfamily: Apocynoideae
- Tribe: Echiteae
- Genus: Pentalinon; Voigt

Synonyms
- Chariomma Miers; Urechites Müll.Arg.

= Pentalinon =

Genus of flowering plants

Pentalinon is a genus of flowering plant vines in the family Apocynaceae. It contains two species and was first described as a genus in 1845. It is native to the West Indies, Central America, Mexico, and Florida. Leaves contain poisonous compounds.

Species

- Pentalinon andrieuxii (Müll.Arg.) B.F.Hansen & Wunderlin - Hidalgo, Tabasco, Yucatán Peninsula, Oaxaca, Chiapas, Belize, Guatemala, El Salvador, Honduras, Nicaragua
- Pentalinon luteum (L.) B.F.Hansen & Wunderlin - Bahamas, Cayman Islands, Turks & Caicos Islands, Cuba, Hispaniola, Puerto Rico, Lesser Antilles, Jamaica, islands of western Caribbean, S Florida
