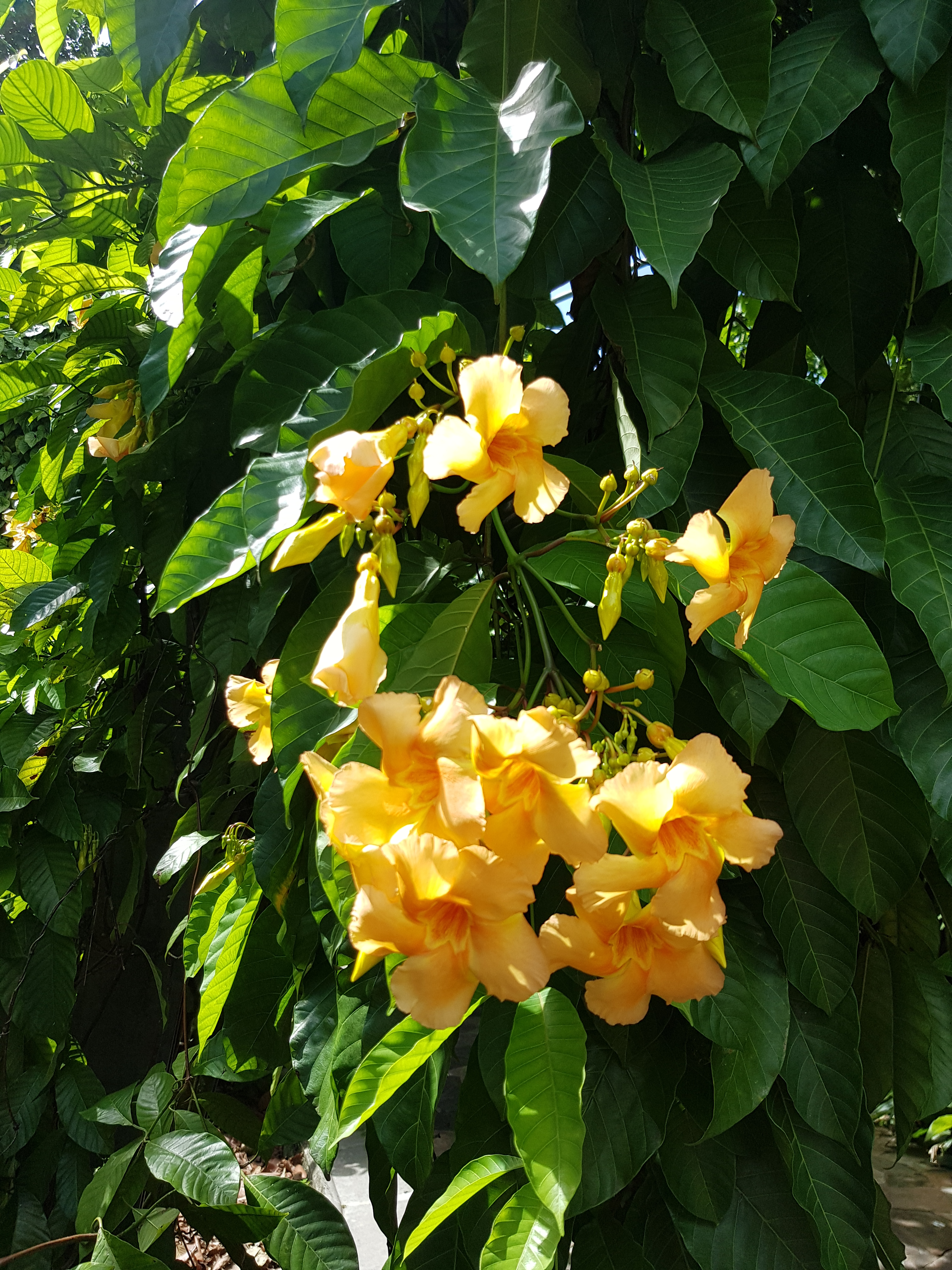
- Odontadenia macrantha

Scientific classification
- Kingdom: Plantae
- Clade: Tracheophytes
- Clade: Angiosperms
- Clade: Eudicots
- Clade: Asterids
- Order: Gentianales
- Family: Apocynaceae
- Subfamily: Apocynoideae
- Tribe: Odontadenieae
- Genus: Odontadenia; Benth.

Type species
- Odontadenia macrantha (Roem. & Schult.) Markgr. (1819)

Synonyms
- Anisolobus A.DC.; Codonechites Markgr.; Cylicadenia Lem.; Haplophandra Pichon; Perictenia Miers

= Odontadenia =

Genus of flowering plants

Odontadenia is a genus of plant in the family Apocynaceae, first described as a genus in 1841. It is native to southern Mexico, Central America, South America, and the West Indies.

Species

1. Odontadenia anomala (Van Heurck & Müll.Arg.) J.F.Macbr. - Peru, Bolivia
2. Odontadenia campanulata J.F.Morales - Colombia
3. Odontadenia funigera Woodson - Venezuela, Colombia, Ecuador, Peru, Brazil
4. Odontadenia geminata (Hoffmanns. ex Roem. & Schult.) Müll.Arg. - 3 Guianas, Venezuela, Colombia, Ecuador, Peru, Bolivia, N Brazil
5. Odontadenia glauca Woodson - Amazonas State in S Venezuela
6. Odontadenia gracilipes (Stadelm.) Woodson - Minas Gerais
7. Odontadenia hypoglauca (Stadelm.) Müll.Arg. - Bolivia, Brazil
8. Odontadenia killipii Woodson - French Guiana, Venezuela, Colombia, Ecuador, Peru, N Brazil
9. Odontadenia kochii Pilg. - Guyana, Venezuela, Colombia, Ecuador, Peru, N Brazil
10. Odontadenia laxiflora (Rusby) Woodson - Peru, Bolivia, N Brazil
11. Odontadenia lutea (Vell.) Markgr. - Peru, Bolivia, Brazil
12. Odontadenia macrantha (Roem. & Schult.) Markgr. - Oaxaca, Chiapas, Central America, Trinidad & Tobago, 3 Guianas, Venezuela, Colombia, Ecuador, Peru, Brazil
13. Odontadenia markgrafiana J.F.Morales - French Guiana, N Brazil
14. Odontadenia matogrossana J.F.Morales - Goiás, Mato Grosso
15. Odontadenia nitida (Vahl) Müll.Arg. - Trinidad & Tobago, 3 Guianas, Venezuela, Colombia, Ecuador, Peru, Brazil, Bolivia
16. Odontadenia perrottetii (A.DC.) Woodson - Venezuela, Colombia, Brazil, Bolivia, Guyana, French Guiana
17. Odontadenia polyneura (Urb.) Woodson - Hispaniola
18. Odontadenia puncticulosa (Rich.) Pulle - Central America, 3 Guianas, Venezuela, Colombia, Ecuador, Peru, Brazil, Bolivia
19. Odontadenia stemmadeniifolia Woodson - Venezuela, Colombia, Ecuador, Peru, Brazil
20. Odontadenia verrucosa (Willd. ex Roem. & Schult.) K.Schum. ex Markgr. - 3 Guianas, Venezuela, Colombia, Ecuador, Peru, Brazil, Bolivia, Panama, Costa Rica, Nicaragua

formerly included

1. Odontadenia cuspidata Rusby = Mandevilla cuspidata (Rusby) Woodson
2. Odontadenia duckei Markgr. = Mandevilla pohliana (Stadelm.) A.H.Gentry
3. Odontadenia glandulosa (Ruiz & Pav.) K.Schum. = Mandevilla glandulosa (Ruiz & Pav.) Woodson
4. Odontadenia macrocalyx (Müll.Arg.) Miers = Tabernaemontana macrocalyx Müll.Arg.
