= Chasteler =

Belgian noble family

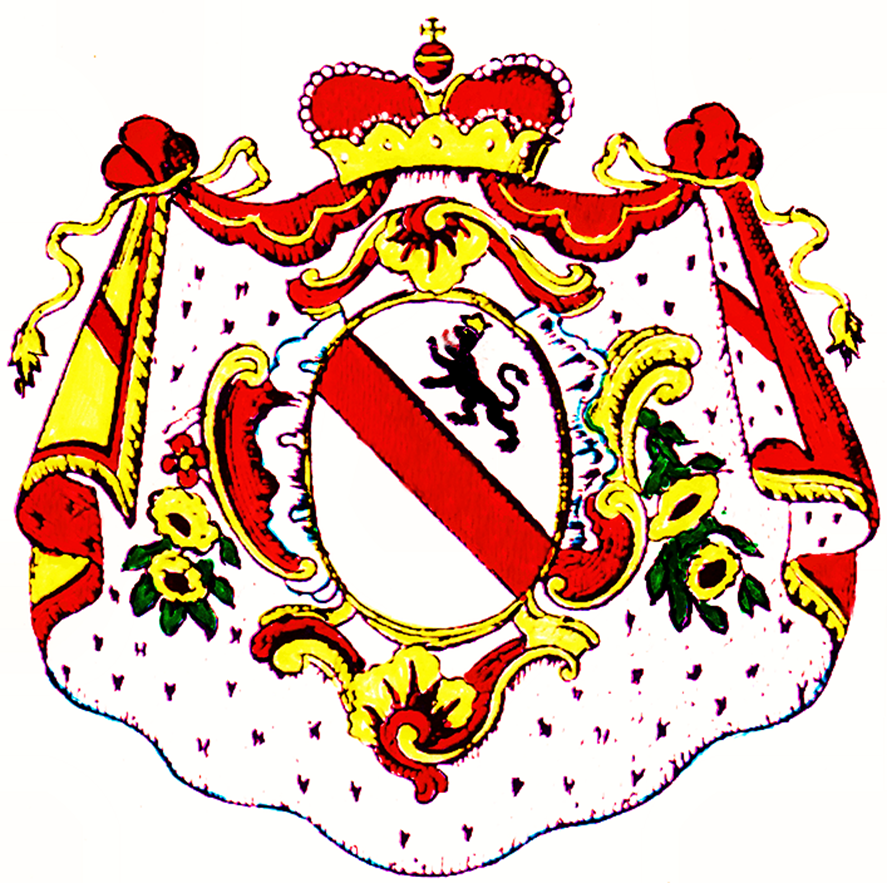
Chasteler family coat of arms

The Chasteler family sometimes Chasteler de Moulbaix is an old Belgian noble family, with right to bear the titles of Marquess of Chasteler, Marquess of Courcelles and Marquess of Moulbaix. this family descends from a branch of the dukes of Lorraine.

== History ==
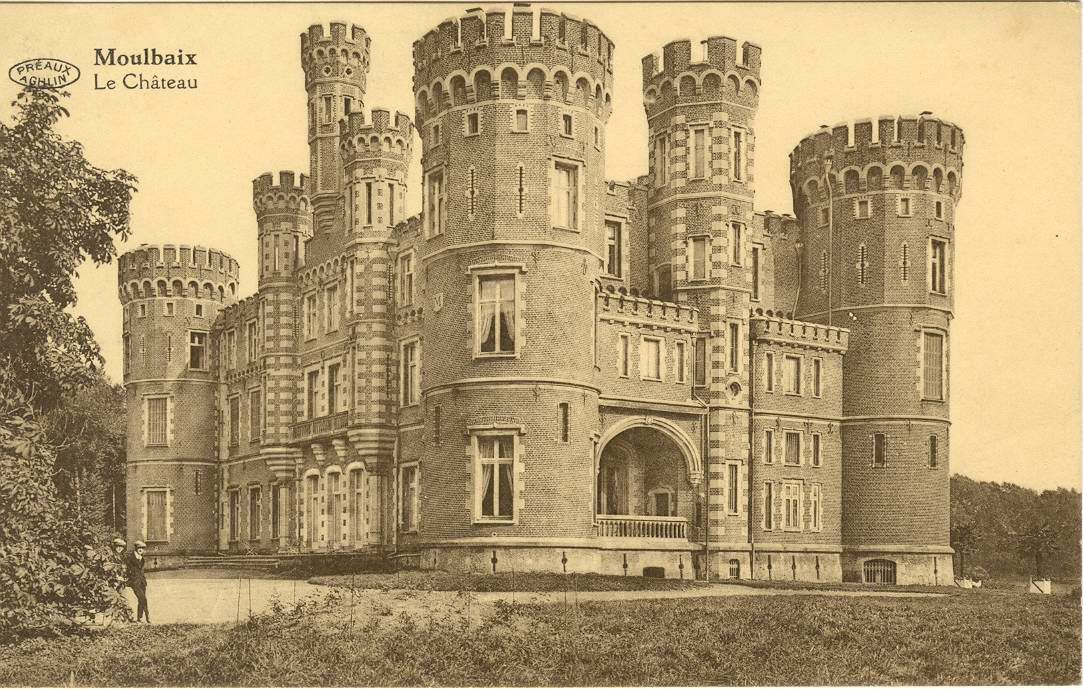
Moulbaix Castle, built by Oswald de Chasteler and a former urban exploration site

This family was founded by Thierry, Lord of Chasteler (casteletum) in France in Lorraine around 1300. About the exact origins few is known, in the 18th century genealogist believed that Thierry was related to the house of Chatelet, this theory is disputed in the 19th century. Theory says Thierry was a son of Frederick II, Duke of Lorraine. After his death he was succeeded by his son Ferry, Lord of Chasteler. The next generation leaves Lorraine. The Lordship of Moulbaix was obtained in the 15th century by marriage, and in this period the lords owned land both in Wallonia and in Lorraine. Jean François (1691–1764) became the First Marquess of Chasteler and Moulbaix in 1725. Empress Maria Theresia decided in 1769 that all descendants of François Joseph Gabriel were given the right to be titled Marquess of Chasteler and Moulbaix.

== Genealogy ==
Jean-François du Chasteler (1691–1764), 1st Marquess of Chasteler and Moulbaix: Married to Marie-Claire-Josèphe du Sart (+ 1758).

  - François Gabriel Joseph du Chasteler de Courcelles :
    - 1st wedding: Albertine, daughter of Johan, Graf von Thürnheim (1742–1765).
      - Johann Gabriel Josef Albert du Chasteler de Courcelles, (1763–1825)
      - Philippine Françoise Josephe Dorothée du Chasteler, (1764)
      - Marie Josephe Julie Feliciane du Chasteler, (1765)
    - 2nd Wedding:Catherine de Hasselaer
      - Gérard-Arnoult-Frédéric-Gabriël du Chasteler, born 1770: Married Josephine Ubesch.
        - Ida-Hélène-Caroline du Chasteler, born 1798:
          Married to Julien Visart de Bocarmé (1787–1851)
          - Hippolyte Visart de Bocarmé.
  - François Antoine Marie Chrétien du Chasteler, (1756–1820): Married Marie Thérèse de Fourneau.
    - Albert François du Chasteler, (1794–1836): Aide-de-camp of King Leopold I during his oath: married Victoire Tons.
      - Oswald Volckmar Gabriel François Jean Baptiste du Chasteler (1822–1865): Built Moulbaix Castle married Louise Caroline, Countess de Marnix.
        - Charles Gabriel Marie Ghislain du Chasteler (1861–1908)
  - Marie Joseph Julie du Chasteler, Countess de Baillencourt.
  - Marie-Claire du Chasteler:
    Married to Gustave Visart de Bury et de Bocarmé
    - Julien Visart de Bocarmé (1787–1851):
      married to his cousin Ida du Chasteler.
      - Hippolyte Visart de Bocarmé.
