= Jean Stas =

Belgian chemist, co-discoverer of the atomic weight of carbon

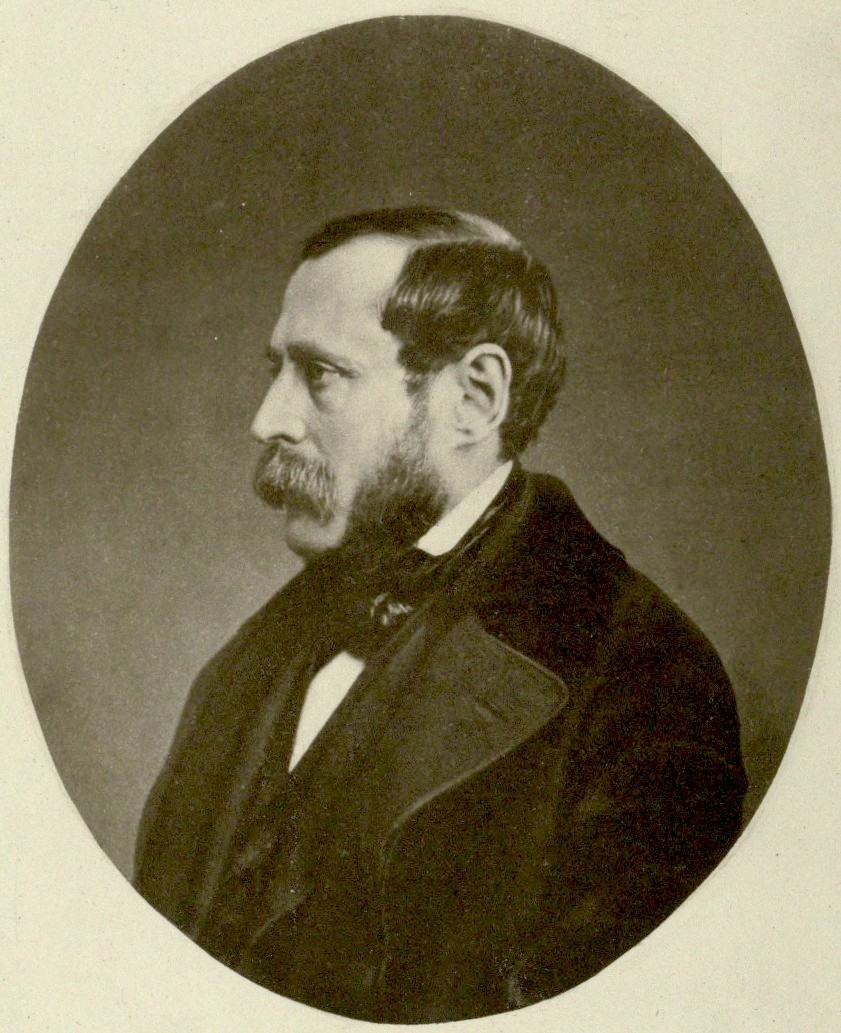
- Stas in an 1894 publication
- Born: 21 August 1813; Leuven, First French Empire
- Died: 13 December 1891 (aged 78)
- Known for: Accurate determination of atomic weights Co-discoverer of the atomic weight of carbon Forensic chemistry
- Awards: Davy Medal (1885)
- Scientific career
- Fields: Chemistry

Signature
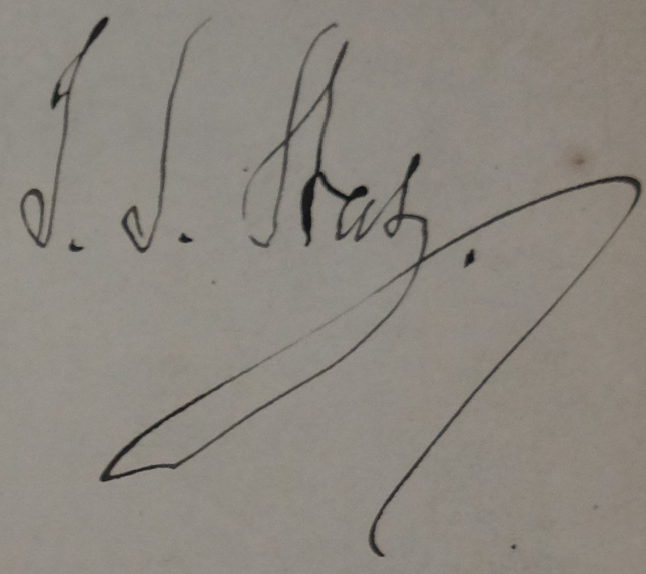

Jean Servais Stas (21 August 1813 – 13 December 1891) was a Belgian analytical chemist who accurately measured the atomic weight of carbon.

== Life and work ==
Stas was born in Leuven and trained initially as a physician. He later switched to chemistry and worked at the École Polytechnique in Paris under the direction of Jean-Baptiste Dumas. Stas and Dumas established the atomic weight of carbon by weighing a sample of the pure material, burning it in pure oxygen, and then weighing the carbon dioxide produced.

In 1840, Stas was appointed professor at the Royal Military School in Brussels. He acquired international fame by determining the atomic weights of the elements more accurately than had ever been done before, using an atomic mass of 16 for oxygen as his standard. His results disproved the hypothesis of the English physicist William Prout that all atomic weights must be integer multiples of that of hydrogen. These careful, accurate atomic weight measurements of Stas helped lay the foundation for the periodic system of elements of Dmitri Mendeleev and others.

Following the pioneering work of Lavoisier and his statement of the conservation of mass, the prolonged and exhaustive experiments of Stas supported the strict accuracy of this law in chemical reactions, even though they were carried out with other intentions. His research indicated that in certain reactions the loss or gain could not have been more than from 2 to 4 parts in 100,000. The difference in the accuracy aimed at and attained by Lavoisier on the one hand, and by Morley and Stas on the other, is enormous. He accomplished his experiments by making highly accurate gravimetry with finely constructed scales and large quantities of samples. For example, he used some 10 kg of iodine, 406 g of silver, etc. For the scales, he used weights made of pure platinum, the largest weight being 1 kg and directly comparing with the Paris standard. He corrected for the buoyancy due to air by enclosing samples within containers of known volume, then evacuating the container to remove the weight of air inside. Liquid volumes were measured by titration pipettes surrounded by water to ensure their temperature remains uniform and constant, avoiding thermal expansion effects.

Defining the molar mass of H = 1.000, then he found: N = 14.009, Li = 7.004, Na = 22.980, K = 39.040, Cl = 35.368, Br = 79.750, I = 126.533, Ag = 107.660. His result conclusively disproved Prout's hypothesis, Dumas's 1/2 and 1/4 atomic weight hypothesis (i.e. the atomic weight of each element is n/4 that of hydrogen, for some positive integer n >= 4), and Döbereiner's triad theory.

Guy-Lussac developed the wet silver assay method. In this method, there is a liquid containing an unknown concentration of silver ion. To measure the concentration, one titrates an aqueous solution of sodium chloride whose concentration of sodium chloride is known accurately. Stas improved the method by using sodium bromide instead, since AgBr is less soluble than AgCl.

In 1850, Stas gave the evidence that the Belgian Count Hippolyte Visart de Bocarmé killed his brother-in-law by poisoning him with nicotine.

Stas retired in 1869 because of problems with his voice caused by a throat ailment. He became commissioner of the mint, but resigned in 1872 because he disagreed with the government's monetary policy. Jean Stas died in Brussels and was buried at Leuven.

== Honors and awards ==
- Foreign Member, Royal Society of London (1879)
- Davy Medal (1885)
- Streets named after him

On May 5, 1891 an event was held recognizing the 50th anniversary of Jean Servais Stas' membership in the Royal Academy of Belgium. Various presenters spoke about his significant scientific contributions. He was presented with a medal in his honor sculpted by Belgian engraver Alphonse Michaux and with an album containing accolades authored by scientific societies from around the world.

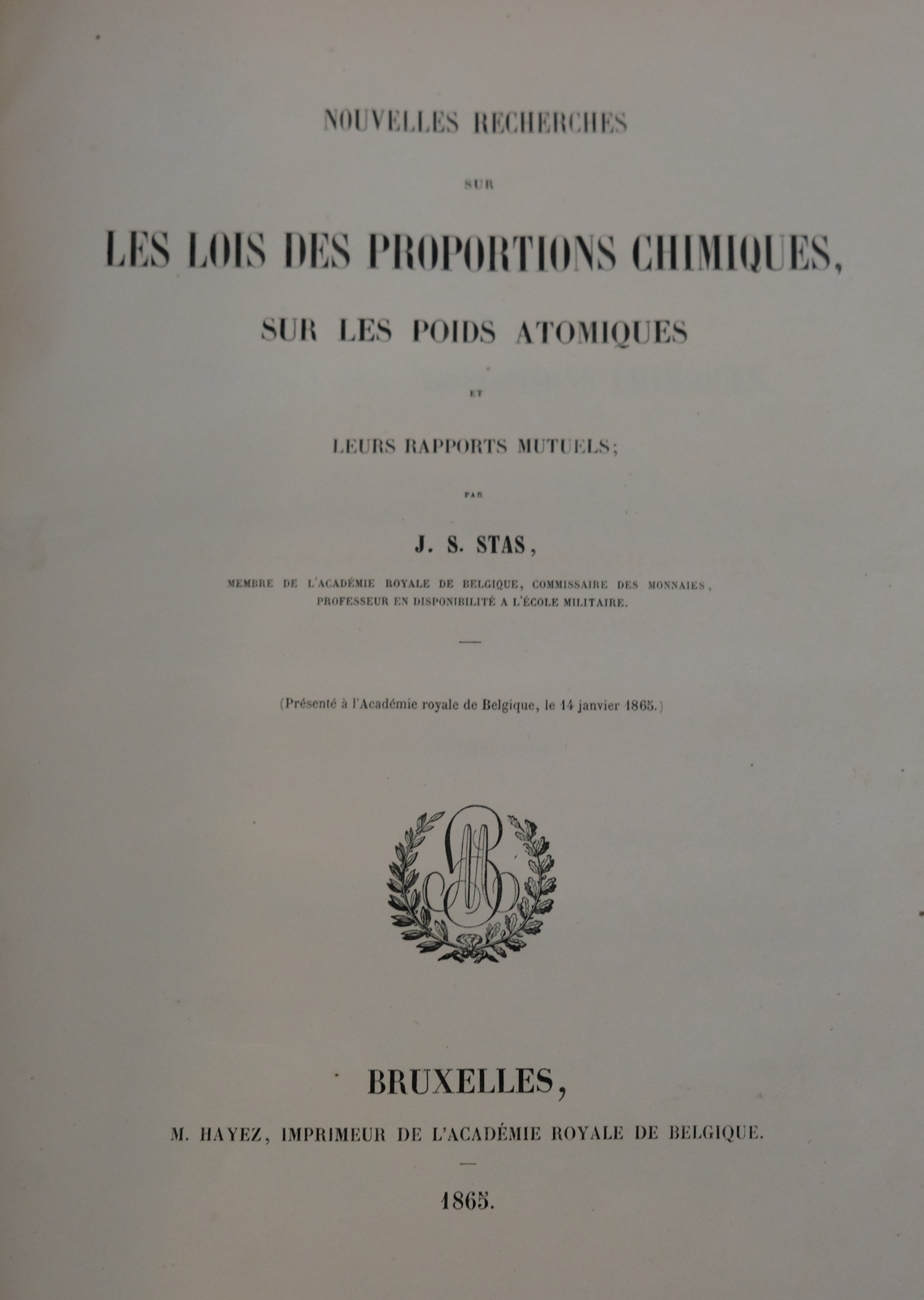
Nouvelles recherches sur les lois des proportions chimiques : sur les poids atomiques et leurs rapports mutuels (1865)

== Selected writings ==
- Stas, Jean Servais (1894). L. W. Spring (ed.). Œuvres Complètes. Vol. 1. Brussels.
- Stas, Jean Servais (1894). J. B. Depaire (ed.). Œuvres Complètes. Vol. 2. Brussels: Bruxelles [etc.] C. Muquardt.
- Stas, Jean Servais (1894). L. W. Spring (ed.). Œuvres Complètes. Vol. 3. Brussels: Bruxelles [etc.] C. Muquardt.
- Stas, Jean Servais (1865). Nouvelles recherches sur les lois des proportions chimiques : sur les poids atomiques et leurs rapports mutuels. Brussels: Bruxelles. M. Hayez

== See also ==
- Theodore William Richards
- Law of reciprocal proportions
- Mass spectrometry
- Toxicology
