= Odontadenia geminata =

Scientific classification
- Kingdom: Plantae
- Clade: Tracheophytes
- Clade: Angiosperms
- Clade: Eudicots
- Clade: Asterids
- Order: Gentianales
- Family: Apocynaceae
- Genus: Odontadenia
- Species: O. geminata

Binomial name
- Odontadenia geminata (Hoffmanns. ex Roem. & Schult.) Müll.Arg.

Synonyms
- Angadenia coriacea; Angadenia elegans (Benth.) Miers 1878; Angadenia geminata; Angadenia poeppigii; Echites bifurcatus Poepp. ex Müll.Arg.; Echites coriaceus Benth.; Echites elegans Benth.; Echites geminatus Hoffmanns. ex Roem. & Schult.; Odontadenia coriacea (Benth.) Müll.Arg.; Odontadenia poeppigii Müll.Arg.

Species of plant

Odontadenia geminata is a species of plant in the family Apocynaceae. It is found in the 3 Guianas, Venezuela, Colombia, Ecuador, Peru, Bolivia and North Brazil.
