= Hippolyte Visart de Bocarmé =

Belgian noble man and convicted murderer

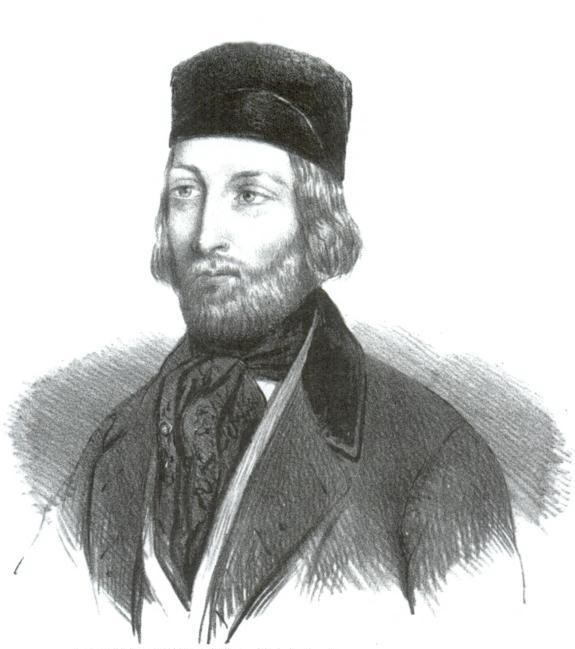
Hippolyte Visart de Bocarmé

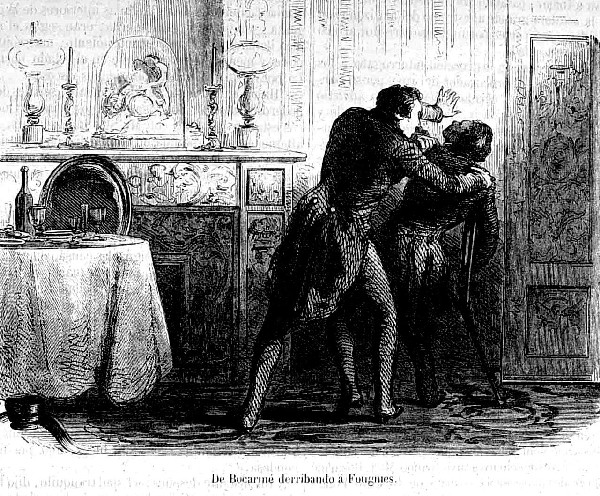
Murder of Gustave Fougnies

Hippolyte Visart de Bocarmé (Weltevreden, Java 14 June 1818 – Mons, Belgium 19 July 1851) was a Belgian nobleman and convicted murderer.

He poisoned his brother-in-law in order to acquire some urgently needed money. In 1851, the chemist Jean Servais Stas proved that Visart de Bocarmé had used nicotine extracted from tobacco leaves as poison. This was the first exact proof of alkaloids in forensic medicine.

== Life ==
Hippolyte Visart de Bocarmé descended from the Belgian noble family Visart de Bocarmé. His father was Julien Visart de Bocarmé (1787–1851) and his mother Ida du Chasteler (1797–1873). His father was a nephew of Johann-Gabriel, Marquess of Chasteler and Courcelles.

Visart de Bocarmé was born aboard a ship heading to Java, where his father had signed to serve as vice-governor. His birth certificate was issued in 1819 in Malaysia. He spent his early years in Java, before his family returned to Europe. Afterwards he lived a few years with his father in Arkansas. He later returned to Belgium and lived in Château de Bitremont.

In 1843, he married Lydia Fougnies, daughter of a retired grocer. They had four children:

- Rodolphe (1844–1844),
- Robert (1845–1907), whose son was Henry de Bury (1872–1958),
- Mathilde (1848–1914), and,
- Rose-Eugénie (1849-unknown).

The couple permanently was short of money. After Fougnies's father died, the count's brother-in-law Gustave Fougnies inherited the property. As Gustave was unmarried and of weak constitution, Hippolyte Visart de Bocarmé assumed he would inherit the fortune soon.

In November 1850, Fougnies announced he was to marry, which was a blow to Visart de Bocarmé's hopes. On 20 November 1850, he invited his brother-in-law to Château de Bitremont. During the dinner Fougnies died, with only the count and countess present in the room. Both claimed that Fougnies had died of apoplexy.

The examination showed however that Fougnies was forced to swallow a poisonous and corrosive substance. The well-known Belgian chemist Jean Servais Stas then proved with a toxicologic examination that Visart de Bocarmé had used tobacco extract to poison his brother-in-law. Stas earned lasting fame, and his method of identifying the alkaloid poisons is fundamentally the same as that used today.

After three weeks of trial, the court pronounced sentence of death upon Hippolyte Visart de Bocarme on 20 June 1851. His wife was acquitted. Hippolyte Visart de Bocarmé was executed by guillotine on 19 July 1851 at Grand-Place in Mons.

== The case in popular culture ==
Visart de Bocarmé murder and the toxicologic examinations by Stas have been described as a case in many specialised books on medical jurisprudence and toxicology.

In 1968, an episode of the Belgian TV series Beschuldigde sta op based on the case was produced. The role of Count Bocarmé was played by actor Bob Van der Veken.

In the early 1990s, the Brussels Comédie Claude Volter showed the play Nicotine et guillotine, which was also based on Count Bocarmé case.

The case is referred to in some detail in John Rhode's 1936 detective novel Death at Breakfast.

== Literature ==
- Louis LABARRE, Le Drame du château de Bury, Mons, 1851
- Procès du comte et de la comtesse de Bocarmé devant la Cour d'assises du Hainaut (1851), Mons, Leroux, 1851.
- Frédéric THOMAS, Petites causes célèbres du jour. Tome 12, 1855
- Pierre BOUCHARDON, Le crime du château de Bitremont, Paris, A. Michel, 1925,
- Henry SOUMAGNE, Le Seigneur de Bury, Brussels, Larcier, 1946.
- Alfred GALLEZ, Le sire de Bitremont, affaire de Bocarmé, Brussels, P. de Méyère, 1959.
- Oscar COOMANS DE BRACHÈNE, État présent de la noblesse belge, Annuaire 2000, Brussels, 2000
- Robert WENNIG, Back to the roots of modern analytical toxicology: Jean Servais Stas and the Bocarmé murder case, in: Drug Test Anal, John Wiley & Sons, April 2009.
- Douglas DE CONINCK, Visart de Bocarmé, in: De Morgen, 14 januari 2012.
