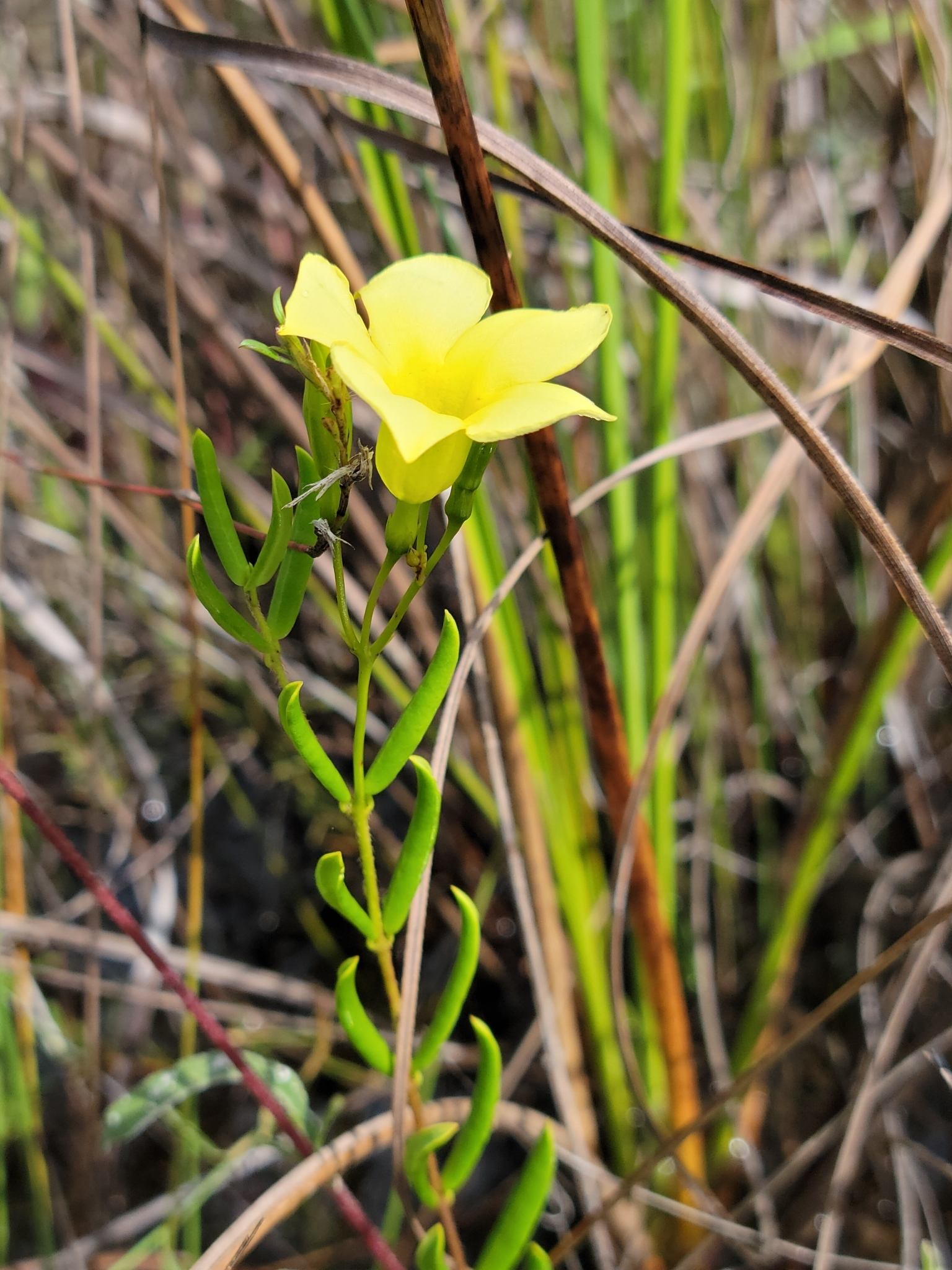

Conservation status
- Vulnerable (NatureServe)

Scientific classification
- Kingdom: Plantae
- Clade: Tracheophytes
- Clade: Angiosperms
- Clade: Eudicots
- Clade: Asterids
- Order: Gentianales
- Family: Apocynaceae
- Genus: Angadenia
- Species: A. berteroi

Binomial name
- Angadenia berteroi (A.DC.) Miers

= Angadenia berteroi =

Pineland golden trumpet

Species of flowering plant

Angadenia berteroi, the pineland golden trumpet, is a plant species in the family Apocynaceae, first described in 1844. It is native to Florida (Monroe + Dade Counties), North Carolina (Washington County), Bahamas, Cuba, Hispaniola, and the Turks and Caicos Islands.
