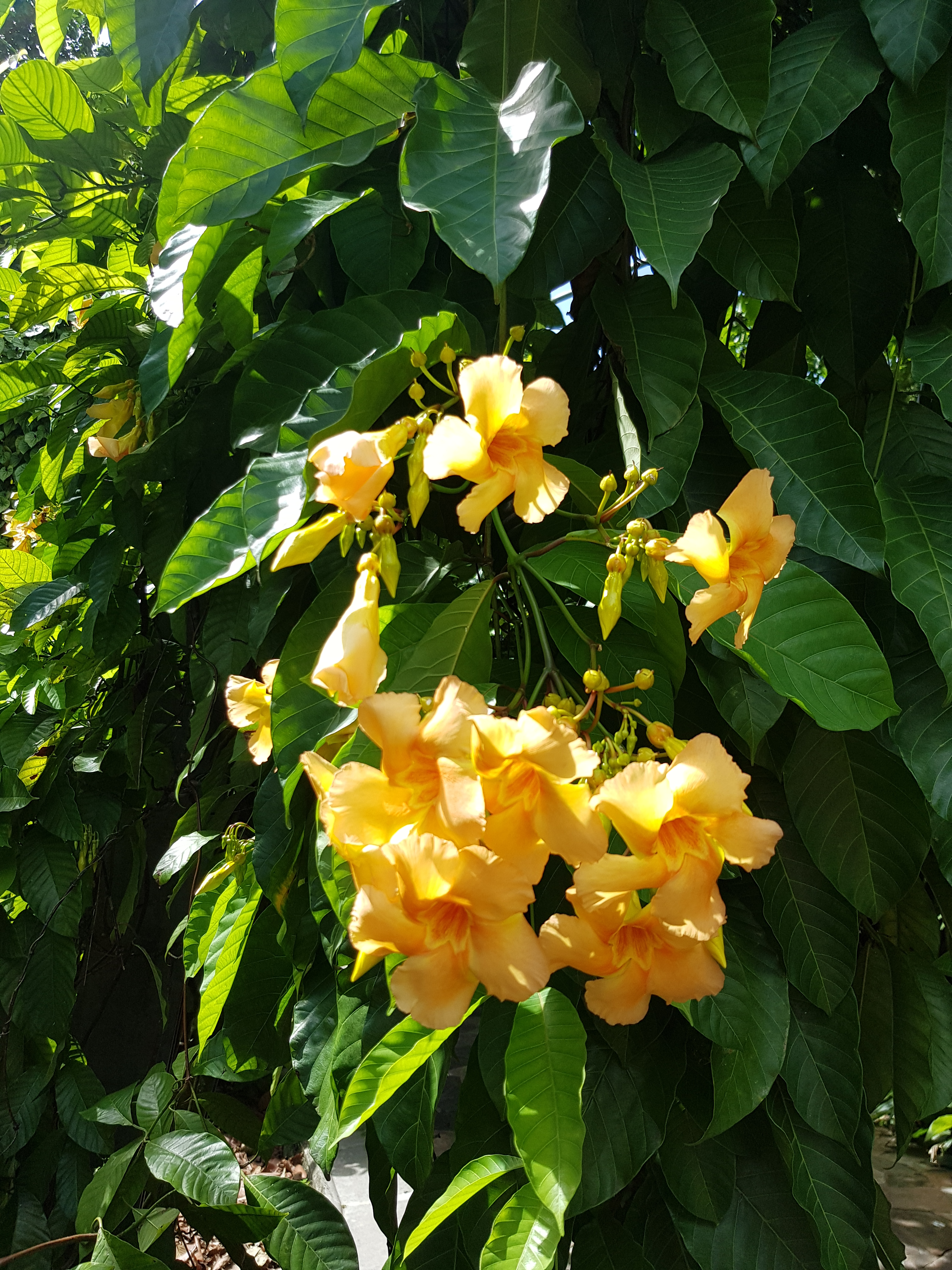
- cult. Singapore Botanic Garden

Scientific classification
- Kingdom: Plantae
- Clade: Tracheophytes
- Clade: Angiosperms
- Clade: Eudicots
- Clade: Asterids
- Order: Gentianales
- Family: Apocynaceae
- Genus: Odontadenia
- Species: O. macrantha

Binomial name
- Odontadenia macrantha (Roem. & Schult.) Markgr.

= Odontadenia macrantha =

Species of flowering plant

Odontadenia macrantha is a vine of the family Apocynaceae native to Central and South America.

The cylindrical stem is either woody or just woody at the base. The smooth oval leaves are 9–35 centimetres (3.5–13.8 in) long by 4–15.5 centimetres (1.6–6.1 in) wide, and sit on 1–1.3-centimetre (0.39–0.51 in) long petioles. They are oppositely arranged on the stem. The orange or yellow flowers are 6–10 centimetres (2.4–3.9 in) in diameter with a 3–4.5-centimetre (1.2–1.8 in) long tube. However, flower shape and colour can vary considerably. Flowering takes place all year, with a peak from December to August, while fruiting peaks from April to October; the smooth seed pods are 20–26 centimetres (7.9–10.2 in) long by 3.5–4.5 centimetres (1.4–1.8 in) wide.

It was originally described as Echites macrantha by Austrian botanists Johann Jacob Roemer and Josef August Schultes in 1819 from material from Brazil. The species name is derived from the Ancient Greek words makros "long" and anther "flower(ing)". George Bentham described it as Odontadenia speciosa in 1841 from material collected from Guyana in 1837. It is the type species of the genus. Odontadenia caudigera was described by Ann Woodson in 1936 from a collection from Belize. Also found in Nicaragua and Costa Rica, this was considered a separate species on account of its smaller and differently shaped corolla, but intermediate flowers have been found on the same plant so is regarded as conspecific. Odontadenia sylvestris, described by Brazil as distinct on a similar basis, is also regarded as a variant of O. macrantha.

Odontadenia macrantha is native to Central and South America, from Guatemala in the north to Brazil in the south, as well as the West Indies, from sea level to 800 metres (2,600 ft) elevation.

It is occasionally cultivated in Singapore.
