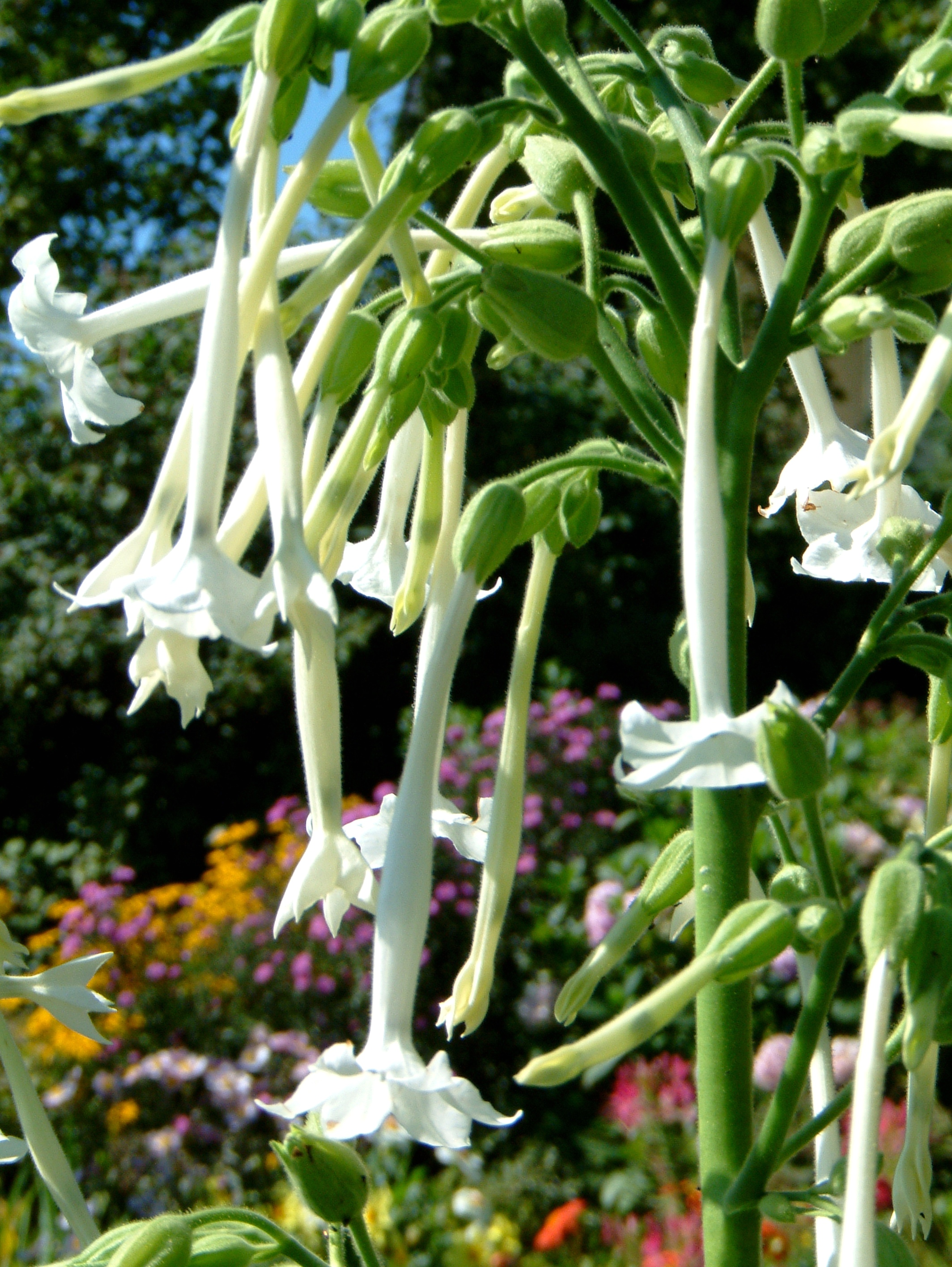

Scientific classification
- Kingdom: Plantae
- Clade: Embryophytes
- Clade: Tracheophytes
- Clade: Spermatophytes
- Clade: Angiosperms
- Clade: Eudicots
- Clade: Asterids
- Order: Solanales
- Family: Solanaceae
- Genus: Nicotiana
- Species: N. sylvestris

Binomial name
- Nicotiana sylvestris Speg. & Comes

= Nicotiana sylvestris =

Species of flowering plant

Nicotiana sylvestris is a species of flowering plant in the nightshade family Solanaceae, known by the common names woodland tobacco, flowering tobacco, and South American tobacco. It is a biennial or short-lived perennial plant in the tobacco genus Nicotiana, native to the Andes region in Argentina and Bolivia, in South America.

== Description ==
It is a tall plant, growing to 1.5 m (4.9 ft) high by 0.5 m (1.6 ft) broad. The leaves are simple, somewhat sticky, with the blade partially surrounding the stem, clasping petiole.

Flowers are produced on many-branched stems. The flowers are tubular, white, borne in racemes held above the foliage. Flowers can be over 7 cm long with a face 2 cm wide. Their intense scent is strongest at night, to attract pollinating moths. Each flower eventually produces a large quantity of small seeds.

This plant is thought to be one of the parents of Nicotiana tabacum, the plant used in modern tobacco production. However, all parts of N. sylvestris can cause discomfort or irritation if consumed.

== Cultivation ==
Nicotiana sylvestris is cultivated as an ornamental plant as it has fragrant and visually interesting flowers.

While most Nicotiana species and members of the Solanaceae family are naturally short-lived perennials, Nicotiana sylvestris is typically cultivated as a half-hardy annual in cold climates. Gardeners usually start seeds indoors under heated conditions in early spring, then transplant seedlings outdoors once frost danger has passed. In Great Britain, this plant can only survive winter outdoors in particularly sheltered coastal regions or select London neighborhoods where temperatures remain above −5 °C (23 °F).

Cultivars of this plant have gained the Royal Horticultural Society's Award of Garden Merit.
