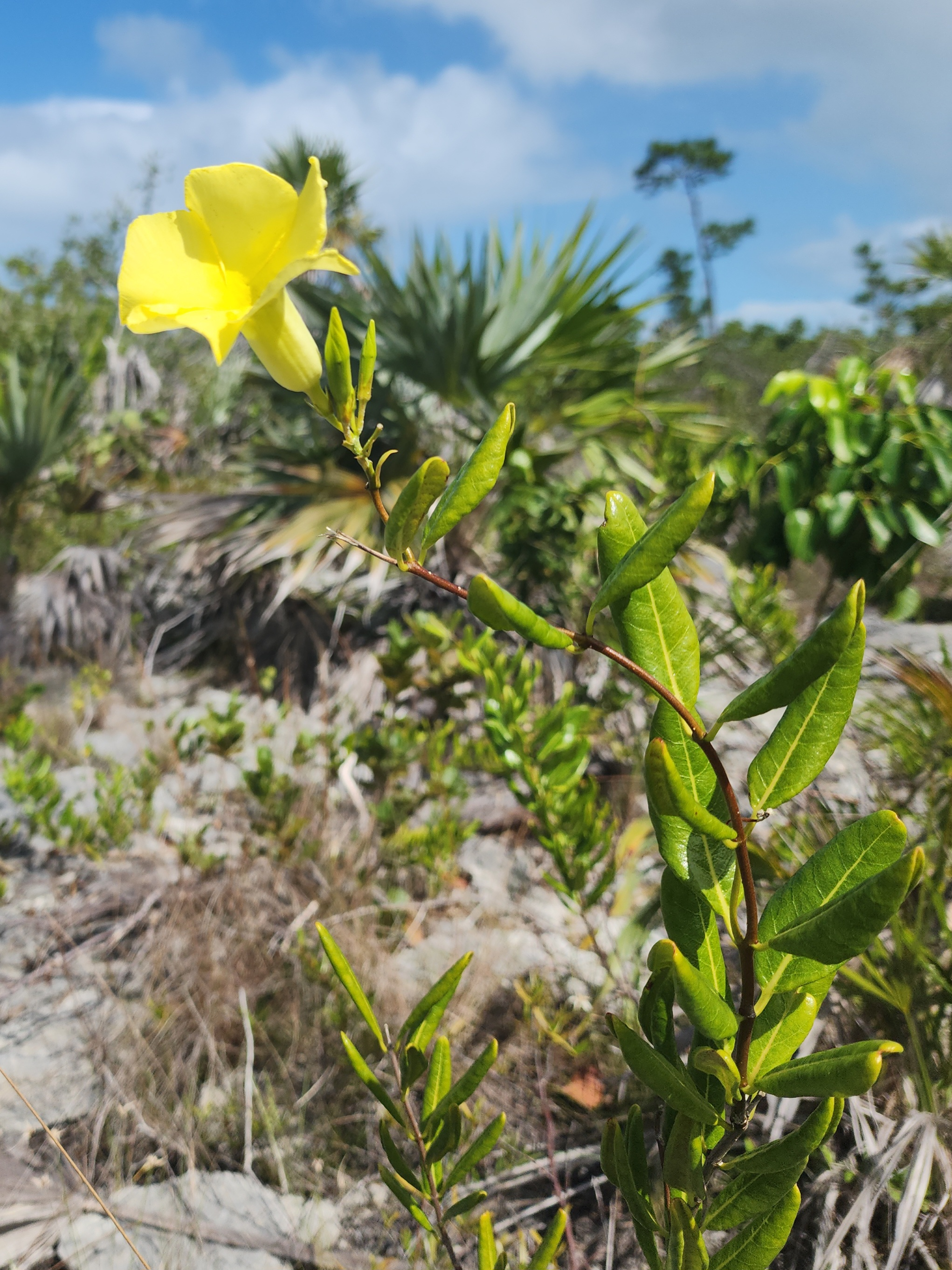

Conservation status
- Secure (NatureServe)

Scientific classification
- Kingdom: Plantae
- Clade: Tracheophytes
- Clade: Angiosperms
- Clade: Eudicots
- Clade: Asterids
- Order: Gentianales
- Family: Apocynaceae
- Genus: Pentalinon
- Species: P. luteum

Binomial name
- Pentalinon luteum (L.) B.F.Hansen & Wunderlin

Synonyms
- Angadenia jamaicensis (Griseb.) Lippold; Apocynum speciosissimum Mill.; Chariomma domingense (Jacq.) Miers; Chariomma domingensis (Jacq.) Miers; Chariomma flava (Hook.) Miers; Chariomma flavum (Hook.) Miers; Chariomma mucronulata Miers; Chariomma scandens Miers; Chariomma surrecta Miers; Chariomma verticillata Miers; Dipladenia flava Hook.; Echites andrewsii Chapm.; Echites barbatus Desv.; Echites catesbaei G.Don; Echites christophorianus Ham.; Echites domingensis Jacq.; Echites heterophyllus J.F.Gmel.; Echites jamaicensis Griseb.; Echites neriandrus Griseb.; Echites obovatus Sessé & Moc.; Echites pellieri Loudon; Echites suberectus Andrews nom. illeg.; Echites suberectus Jacq.; Haemadictyon suberectum (Jacq.) G.Don; Laseguea jaegeri Miers; Laseguea pubiflora Miers; Mitozus jamaicensis (Griseb.) Miers; Neriandra suberecta (Jacq.) A.DC.; Pentalinon suberectum (Jacq.) Voigt; Rhabdadenia barbata Miers; Rhabdadenia laxiflora Miers; Urechites andrewsii (Chapm.) Small; Urechites angustifolia (Ekman & Helwig) Lippold; Urechites dolichantha Urb.; Urechites jaegeri Müll.Arg.; Urechites jamaicensis (Griseb.) Miers; Urechites lutea (L.) Britton; Urechites neriandra (Griseb.) Rolfe; Urechites pinetorum Small; Urechites suberecta (Jacq.) Müll.Arg.; Urechites suberectus (Jacq.) Müll. Arg.; Vinca lutea L.

= Pentalinon luteum =

Species of flowering plant

Pentalinon luteum, commonly known as hammock viper's-tail, licebush, wild allamanda, wild wist yellow mandevilla, and yellow dipladenia, is a vine native to islands of the Caribbean, Honduras, and the U.S. state of Florida.
