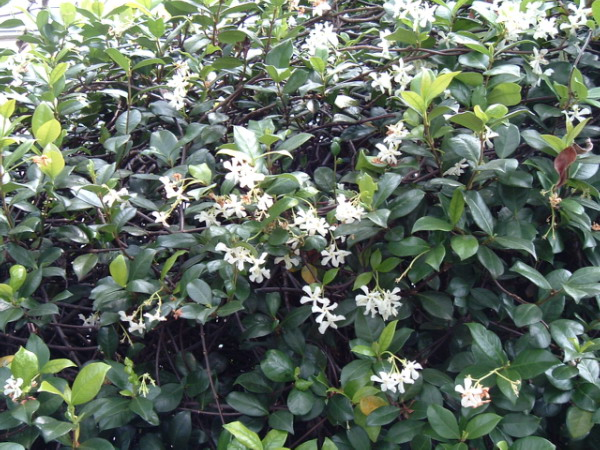
- Trachelospermum jasminoides

Scientific classification
- Kingdom: Plantae
- Clade: Tracheophytes
- Clade: Angiosperms
- Clade: Eudicots
- Clade: Asterids
- Order: Gentianales
- Family: Apocynaceae
- Subfamily: Apocynoideae
- Tribe: Apocyneae
- Genus: Trachelospermum; Lem.

Synonyms
- Rhynchospermum Lindl. 1846, illegitimate homonym, not Reinw. 1825; Parechites Miq.; Microchonea Pierre

= Trachelospermum =

Genus of plants

Flowers of T. jasminoides

Trachelospermum /trəˌkiːloʊˈspɜːrməm/, is a genus of evergreen woody vines in the dogbane family Apocynaceae, first described as a genus in 1851. All species are native to southern and eastern Asia.

They have long stems climbing to 12 m or more high in trees. The leaves are opposite, simple broad lanceolate to ovate, 2–8 cm long and 0.5–4 cm broad. The flowers are salverform (like those of Phlox), simple, 2.5–7 cm broad, with five white, pale yellow or purple petals joined at the base to form a tube.

The generic name Trachelospermum comes from the Greek, literally meaning "neck seed", and referring to the seed shape.

Despite its common name, the species is not a "true jasmine" and not of the genus Jasminum.

== Species ==
1. Trachelospermum asiaticum (Siebold & Zucc.) Nakai - China (incl Tibet + Taiwan), Japan (incl Ryukyu + Bonin Islands), Korea, Indochina, Assam, Borneo, W Malaysia
2. Trachelospermum assamense Woodson - Assam, Bhutan
3. Trachelospermum axillare Hook.f. - China, Himalayas (N + E India, Nepal, Bhutan, Tibet), Thailand, Myanmar
4. Trachelospermum bodinieri (H.Lév.) Woodson - Tibet, Fujian, Guangdong, Guangxi, Guizhou, Hubei, Hunan, Sichuan, Taiwan, Yunnan, Zhejiang
5. Trachelospermum brevistylum Hand.-Mazz. - Anhui, Fujian, Guangdong, Guangxi, Guizhou, Hunan, Sichuan, Tibet
6. Trachelospermum dunnii (H.Lév.) H.Lév. - Guangxi, Guizhou, Hunan, Yunnan, Zhejiang, Vietnam
7. Trachelospermum inflatum (Blume) Pierre ex Pichon - Java, Sumatra
8. Trachelospermum jasminoides (Lindl.) Lem. Japan, Korea, Laos, Vietnam, Anhui, Fujian, Guangdong, Guangxi, Guizhou, Hainan, Henan, Hubei, Hunan, Jiangsu, Jiangxi, Shandong, Shanxi, Sichuan, Taiwan, Tibet, Yunnan, Zhejiang
9. Trachelospermum lucidum (D.Don) K.Schum. - Himalayas (N Pakistan, N + E India, Nepal, Bhutan, Myanmar, Thailand)
10. Trachelospermum ninhii Lý - C Vietnam
11. Trachelospermum vanoverberghii Merr. - Luzon in Philippines

== Formerly included ==
1. Trachelospermum anceps = Kibatalia macrophylla
2. Trachelospermum auritum = Epigynum auritum
3. Trachelospermum curtisii = Epigynum auritum
4. Trachelospermum difforme = Thyrsanthella difformis
5. Trachelospermum esquirolii = Melodinus fusiformis
6. Trachelospermum laurifolium = Kibatalia laurifolia
7. Trachelospermum navaillei = Aganosma schlechteriana
8. Trachelospermum obtusifolium = Anodendron wrayi
9. Trachelospermum philippinense = Micrechites serpyllifolius
10. Trachelospermum slootenii = Chonemorpha verrucosa
11. Trachelospermum stans = Mandevilla foliosa
12. Trachelospermum verrucosa = Chonemorpha verrucosa

== Uses ==
Some species - notably T. asiaticum and T. jasminoides - are cultivated for their foliage and strongly-scented flowers.
