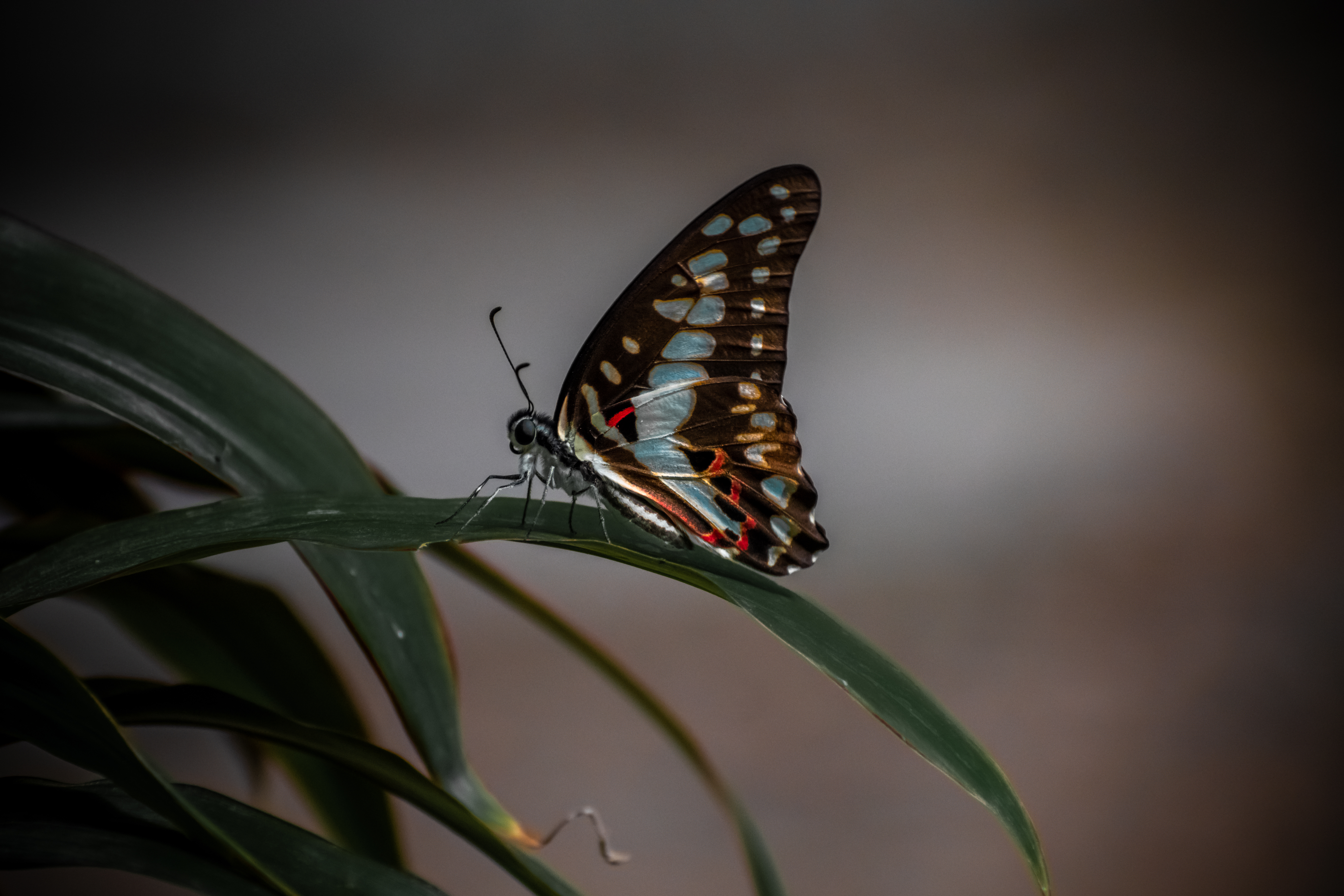

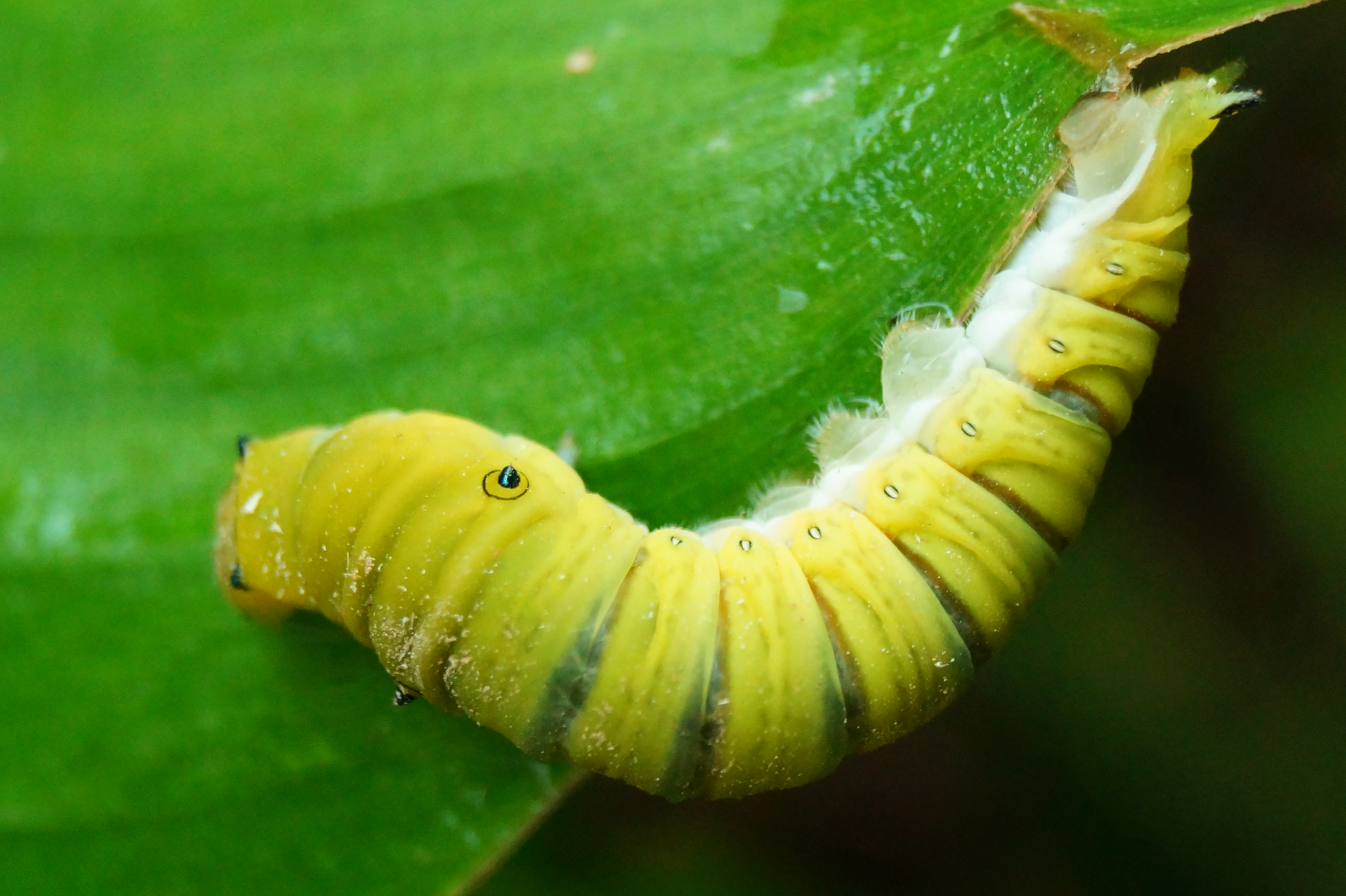

Scientific classification
- Kingdom: Animalia
- Phylum: Arthropoda
- Clade: Pancrustacea
- Class: Insecta
- Order: Lepidoptera
- Family: Papilionidae
- Genus: Graphium
- Species: G. doson

Binomial name
- Graphium doson C. & R. Felder, 1864

= Graphium doson =

Common jay

Species of butterfly

Graphium doson, the common jay, is a black, tropical papilionid (swallowtail) butterfly with pale blue semi-transparent central wing bands that are formed by large spots. There is a marginal series of smaller spots. The underside of wings is brown with markings similar to upperside but whitish in colour. The sexes look alike. The species was first described by father and son entomologists Cajetan and Rudolf Felder.

== Range ==
It is widespread and common throughout Southeast Asia, including lower elevations in Sri Lanka and southern India, Eastern Ghats, Satpuras, Bengal, Assam and Bangladesh, and the Himalayan foothills. The species is however scarce in southern Honshū, Japan.

== Subspecies ==
- G. d. axion (C. & R. Felder, 1864) North India - China, Hainan, Indo-China, Burma, Thailand
- G. d. doson Ceylon
- G. d. eurypylides (Staudinger, 1895) Lombok, Sumbawa
- G. d. evemonides (Honrath, 1884) Peninsular Malaya, Sumatra, Java - Borneo, Philippines
- G. d. gyndes (Fruhstorfer, 1907) Philippines (Palawan, Busuanga, Dumaran)
- G. d. gelap Page and Treadaway, 2011
- G. d. kajanga (Corbet, 1937) Pulau Tioman
- G. d. mikado (Leech, 1887) Japan
- G. d. nauta Tsukada & Nishiyama, 1980 Philippines
- G. d. perillus (Fruhstorfer, 1908)
- G. d. postianus (Fruhstorfer, 1902) Taiwan, Philippines (Batanes)
- G. d. rubroplaga (Rothschild, 1895) Nias
- G. d. robinson Monastyrskii, 2012 South Vietnam, Con Son Island
- G. d. sankapura (Fruhstorfer, 1904) Bawean

== Habitat ==
It is common in thick, riparian, moist, deciduous, semi-evergreen and evergreen forests.

== Behaviour ==
The common jay is active throughout the day and constantly on the move; it rarely settles down. Its flight is swift and straight. When feeding from flowers, it never settles down and keeps its wings vibrating. The males are seen mud-puddling, often in tight groups.

== Life cycle ==
=== Eggs ===
The spherical and pale yellow eggs are laid singly on the underside of leaves.

=== Larva ===
The caterpillar is somewhat spindle shaped. The grown caterpillars have two forms, dark brown or grassy green. There are spines on the fourth segment which are short, conical and blue centred surrounded by lemon yellow and then black rings. The osmeterium is pale bluish green. It is extruded only reluctantly.

=== Pupa ===
The pupa is pale green with a dark purplish median line from the head to the thoracic horn and a yellow line from the tip of the horn to the cremaster.

=== Images of life cycle ===
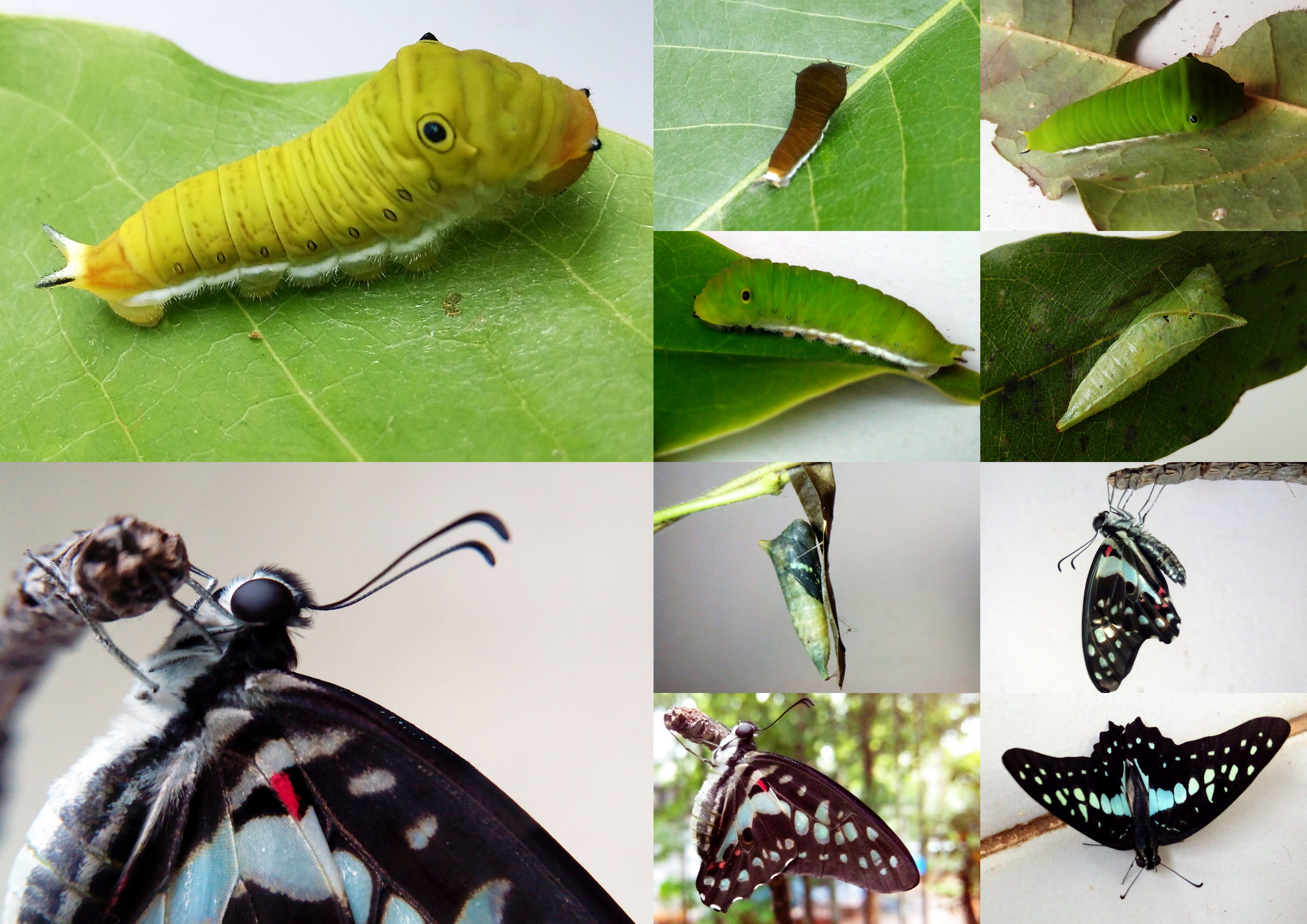
Life cycle

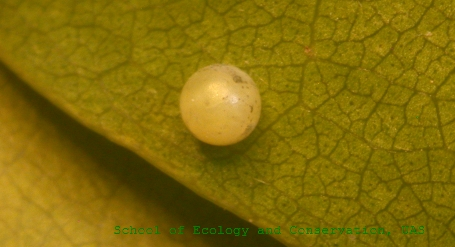
Egg

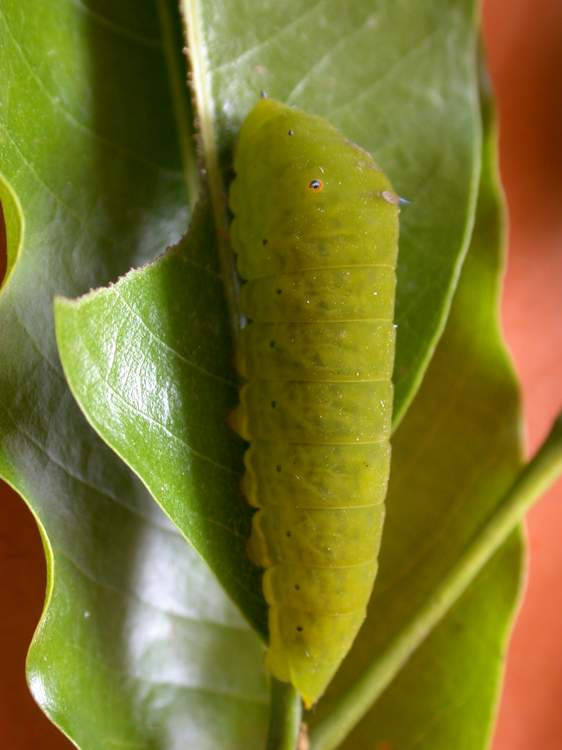
Caterpillar

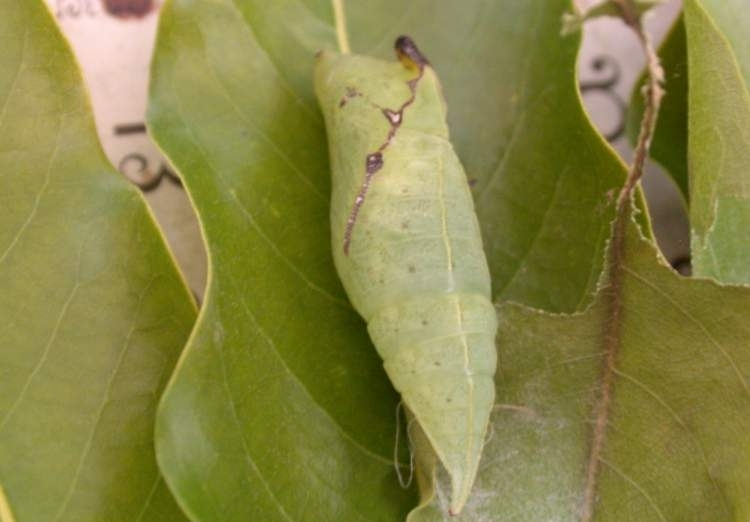
Pupa

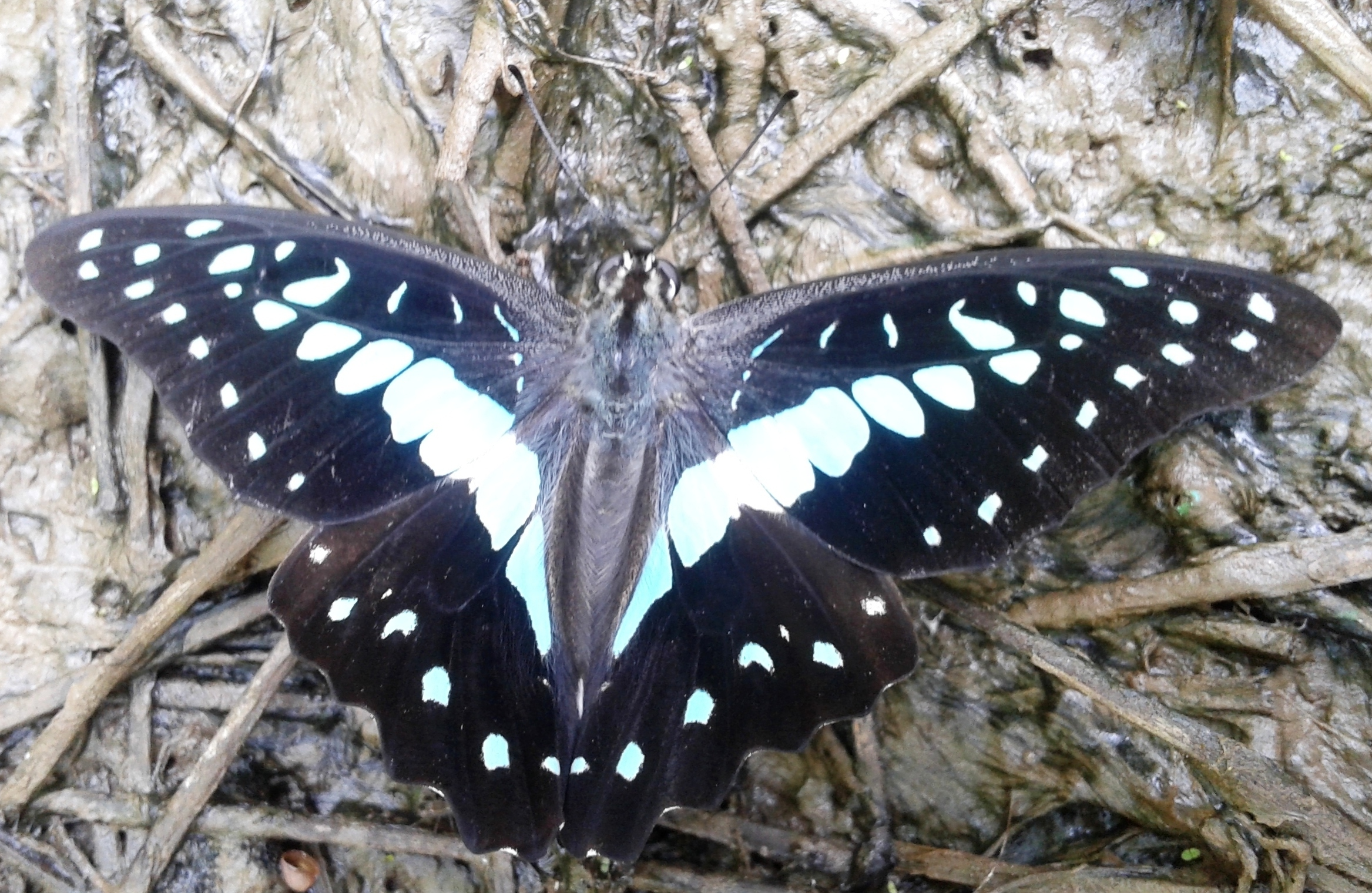
Butterfly

== Food plants ==
The caterpillars feed on plants of the families Annonaceae, Lauraceae and Magnoliaceae such as Annona lawii, Annona muricata, Cinnamomum macrocarpum, Cinnamomum malabatrum, Magnolia grandiflora, Magnolia liliifera, Magnolia oblonga, Hunteria zeylanica, Michelia champaca, Trachelospermum asiaticum and Polyalthia longifolia.

== Gallery ==
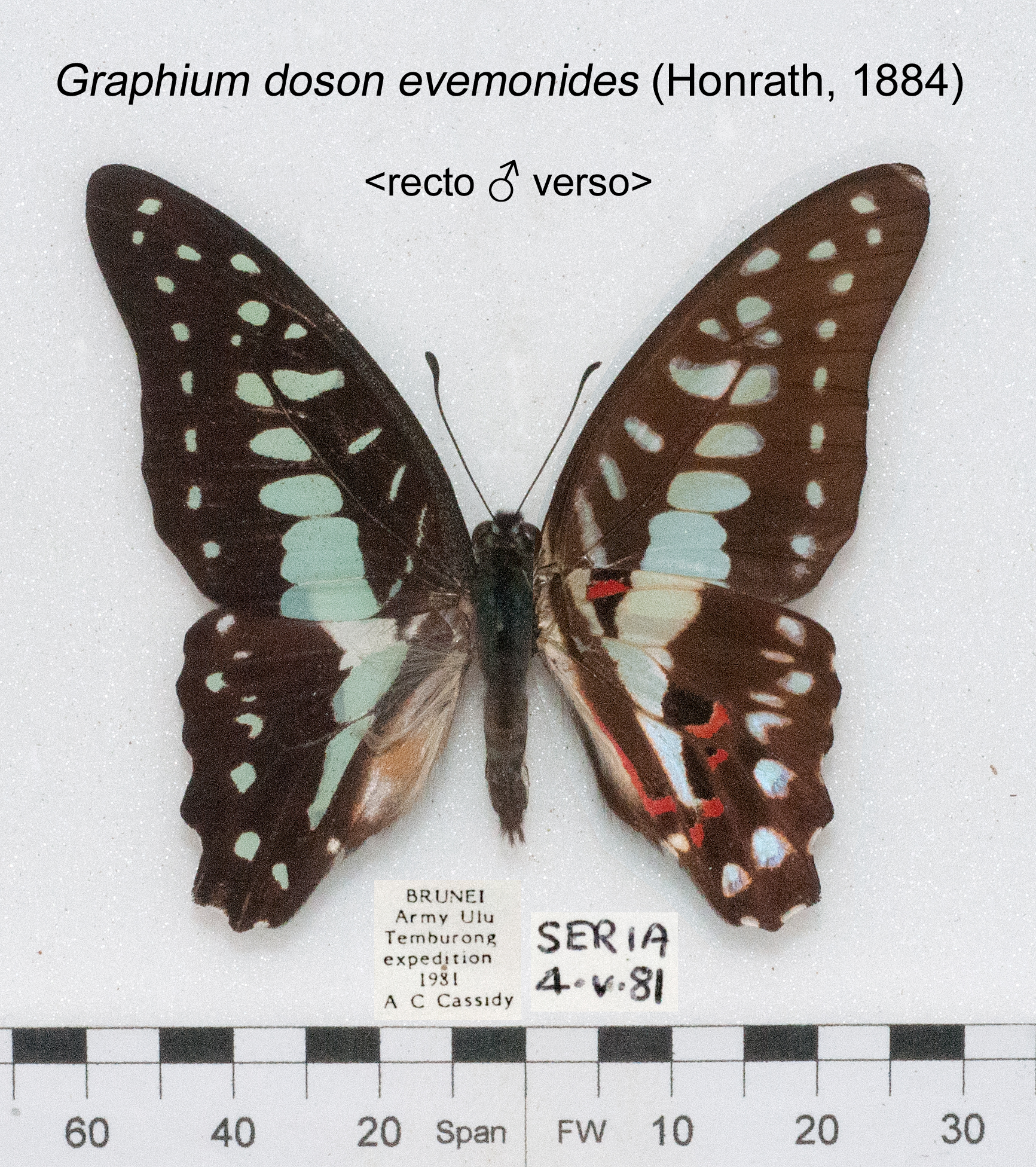

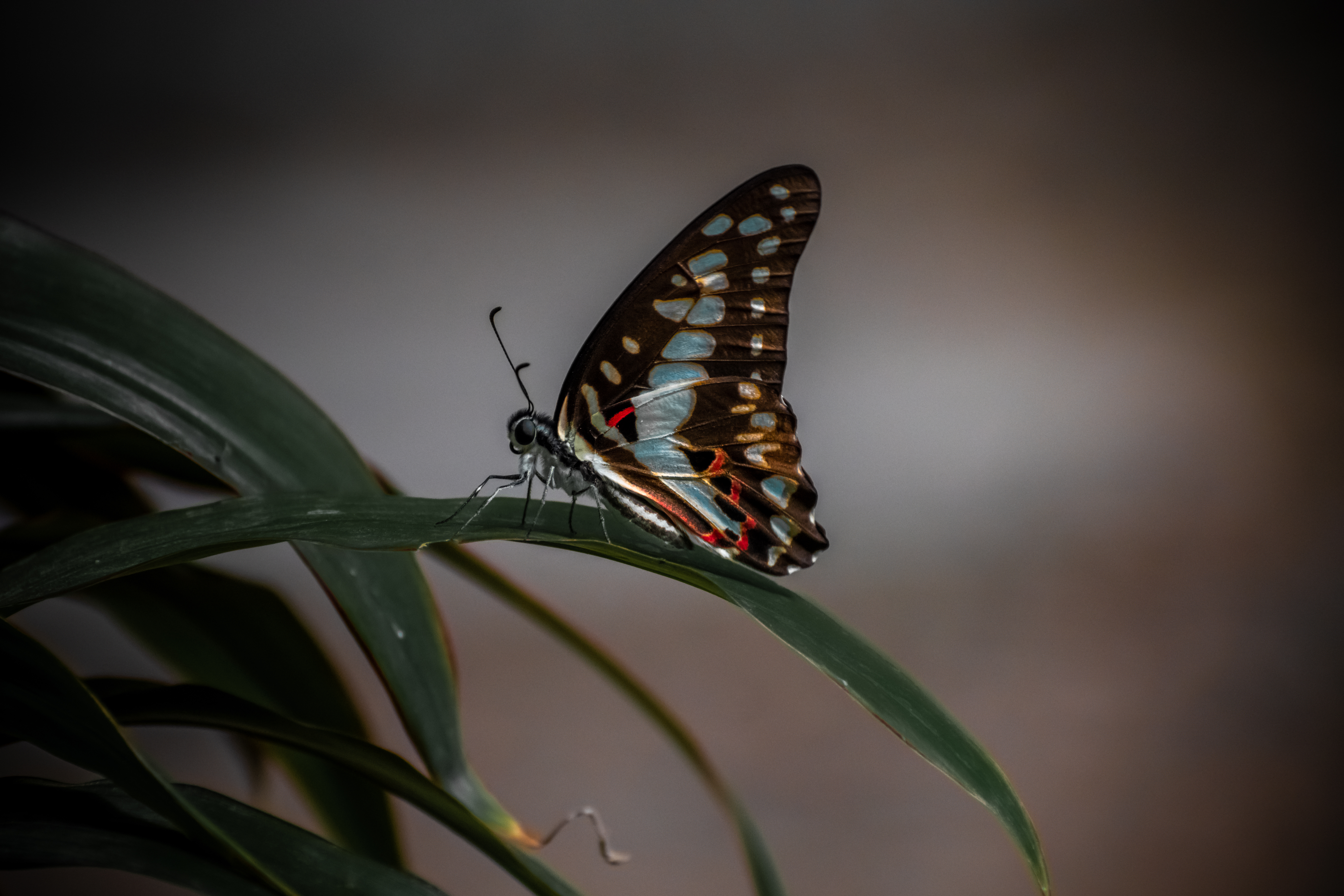
Lateral view of Common Jay butterfly

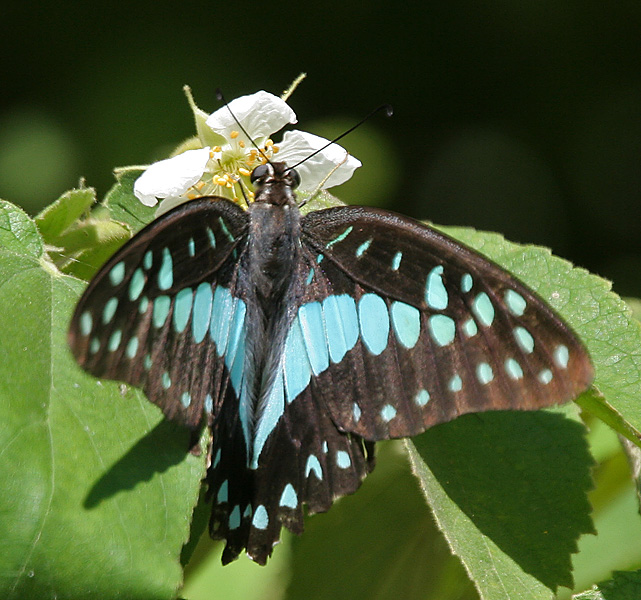
On Singapore cherry (Muntingia calabura) in Hyderabad, India

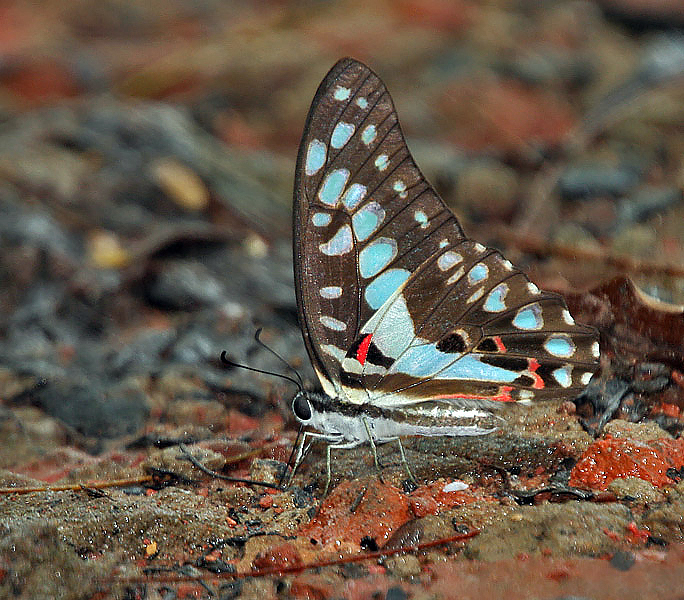
Mud-puddling in Kolkata, West Bengal, India

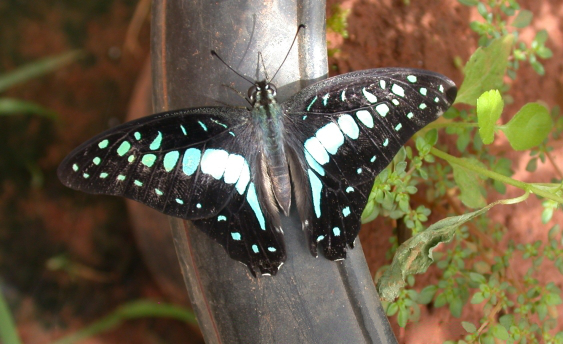
Adult

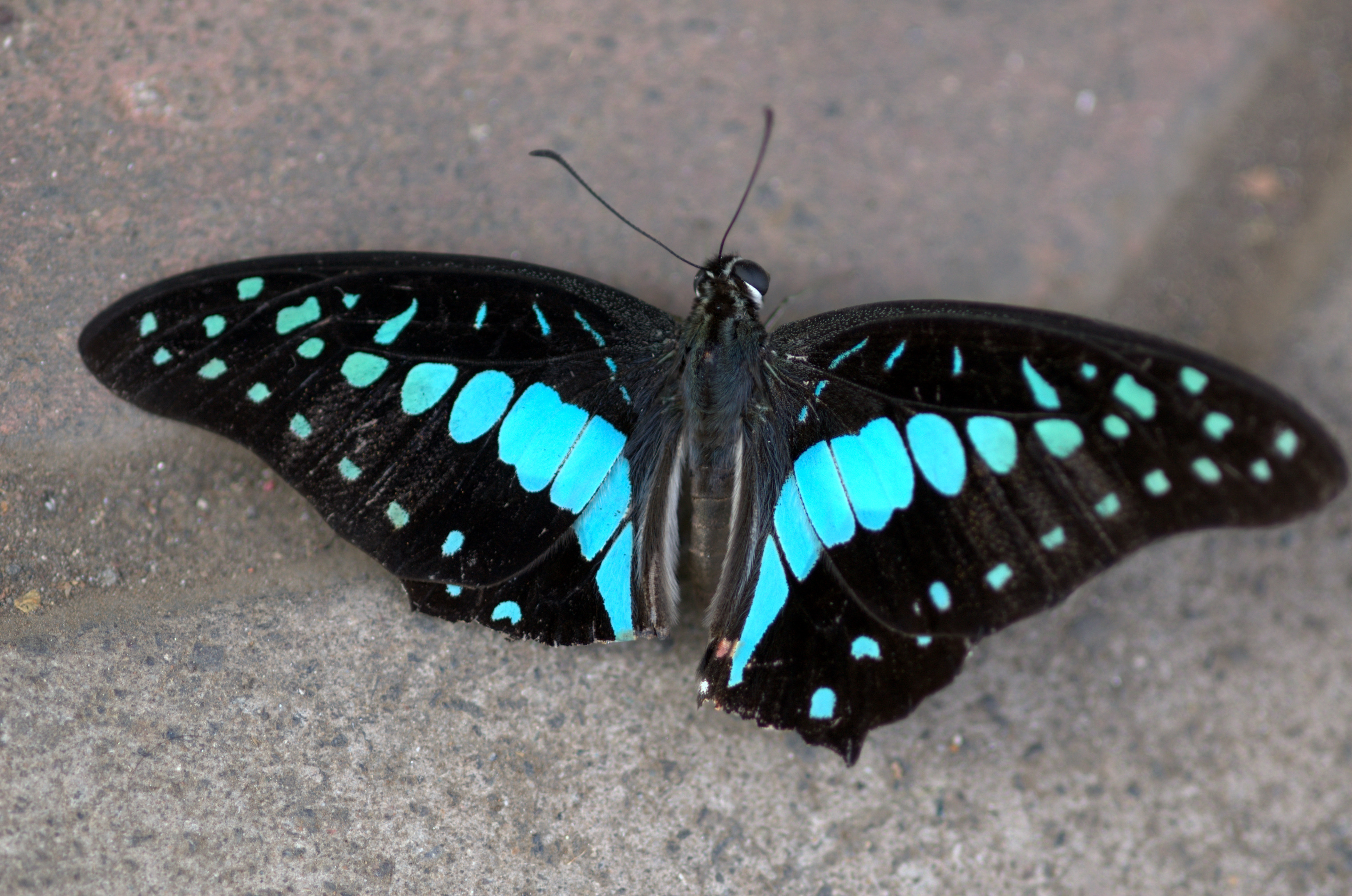

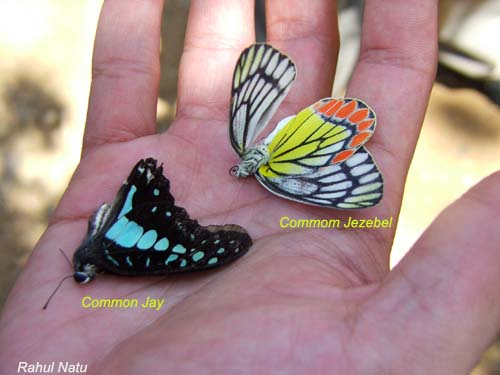
Dead common jay with upper forewing visible

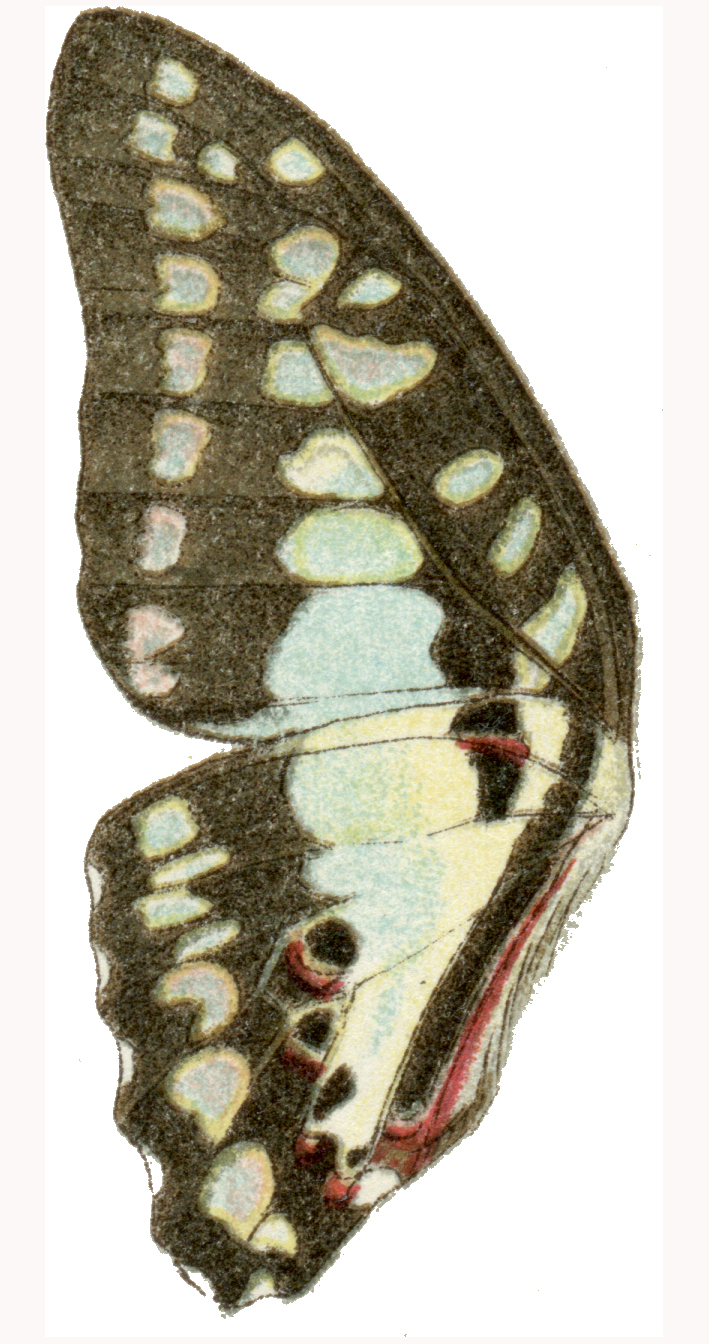
Underside of wing from Adalbert Seitz's Macrolepidoptera of the World

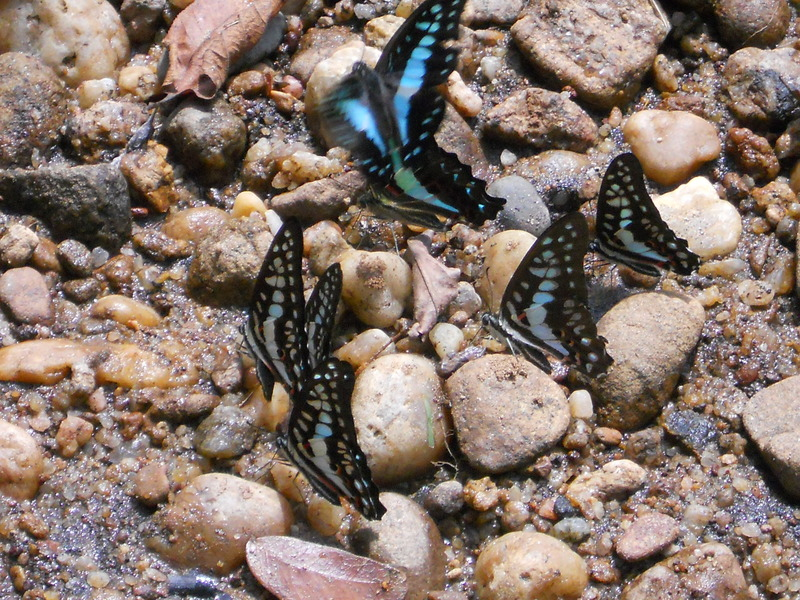
At Achencovil river

== Trivia ==
The Pokémon Caterpie, a caterpillar Pokémon from Pokémon Red, Blue, and Yellow is based on the Graphium doson.

== See also ==
- List of butterflies of India
- Papilionidae
