= Epigynum =

Epigynum may refer to:

- Epigynum (plant), a genus of plants in the family Apocynaceae
- Epigynum (spider), the external genital structure of female spiders
