= Secondatia =

Scientific classification
- Kingdom: Plantae
- Clade: Tracheophytes
- Clade: Angiosperms
- Clade: Eudicots
- Clade: Asterids
- Order: Gentianales
- Family: Apocynaceae
- Subfamily: Apocynoideae
- Tribe: Odontadenieae
- Genus: Secondatia; Decne.

Synonyms
- Orthechites Urb.

Genus of plants

Secondatia is a genus of plants in the family Apocynaceae first described as a genus in 1844. It is native to Jamaica and South America.

Species

- Secondatia densiflora A.DC. - Brazil, 3 Guianas, Venezuela, Colombia, Ecuador, Peru, Bolivia, Paraguay
- Secondatia duckei Markgr. - SE Colombia, NW Brazil
- Secondatia floribunda A.DC. - Brazil
- Secondatia macnabii (Urb.) Woodson - Jamaica
- Secondatia schlimiana Müll.Arg - S Colombia, N Brazil

formerly placed in this genus

- Secondatia arborea (Vell.) Müll.Arg. = Malouetia arborea (Vell.) Miers
- Secondatia difformis (Walter) Benth. & Hook.f. = Thyrsanthella difformis (Walter) Pichon
- Secondatia ferruginea (A.Rich.) Miers = Angadenia berteroi (A.DC.) Miers
- Secondatia stans (A.Gray) Standl. = Mandevilla foliosa (Müll.Arg.) Hemsl.
