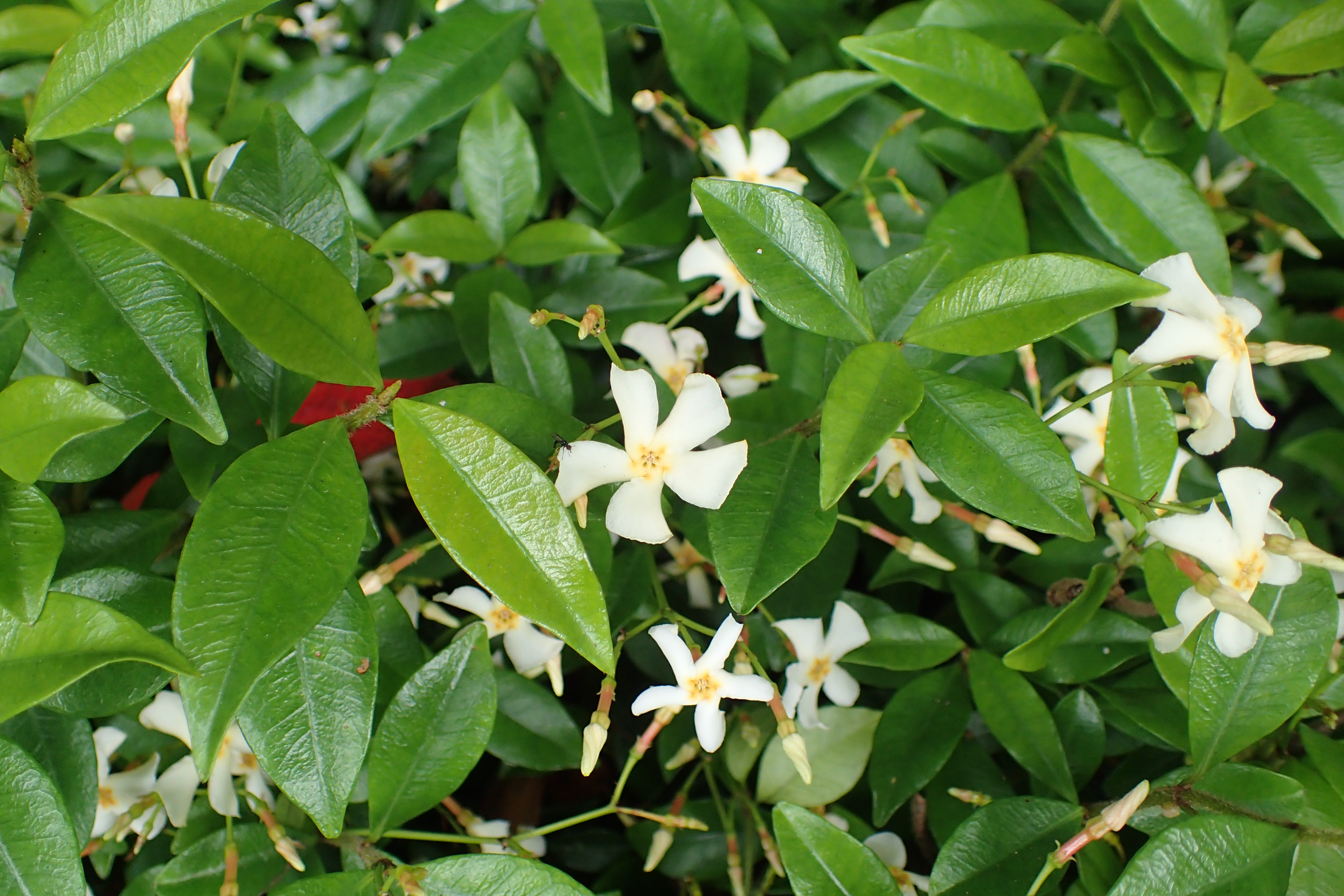

Scientific classification
- Kingdom: Plantae
- Clade: Tracheophytes
- Clade: Angiosperms
- Clade: Eudicots
- Clade: Asterids
- Order: Gentianales
- Family: Apocynaceae
- Genus: Trachelospermum
- Species: T. asiaticum

Binomial name
- Trachelospermum asiaticum (Siebold & Zucc.) Nakai

= Trachelospermum asiaticum =

Species of flowering plant

Trachelospermum asiaticum, the Asiatic jasmine, is a species of flowering plant in the family Apocynaceae and it is native to Asia. Its flowers resemble stars, so it is also referred to as yellow star jasmine or Asian star jasmine. This is a fast growing evergreen vine, often used to cover fences, walls, and similar surfaces. It is heat- and cold- tolerant, and grows even in shady areas.

== Etymology ==
The Latin specific epithet asiaticum means "from Asia".

It was first described by Philipp Franz von Siebold and Joseph Gerhard Zuccarini in 1846. Bavarian physician and naturalist Siebold spent time in Japan between 1823 and 1829. Back in Germany with his collections, he was assisted by Zuccarini, professor of botany at LMU Munich to describe this plant under its original name of Malouetia asiatica (1846).

== Description ==
Growing to 6 m (20 ft) tall, Trachelospermum asiaticum is a woody, evergreen climber with glossy, leathery leaves and strongly scented cream-coloured flowers in summer. The stems, when cut, exude a milky white latex. The leaves are simple and opposite, persistent, borne by a petiole 2–10 mm, with an elliptic limb, narrowly ovate, 2–10 x 1–5 cm, membranous. Glossy green leaves have a brown-orange tinge stained reddish during the winter. The hardiest Trachelospermum species, this plant can be grown in temperate areas against a sheltered wall or fence. It has been known to spread rapidly, and can take over large areas very rapidly.

=== Inflorescence ===
The white or cream flowers have a yellow heart and emit a scent of jasmine. They are held in terminal or axillary cymes. The five sepals are contiguous to the tube of the corolla and carry 10 basal glands. The hypocrateriform corolla consists of a tube 6-10mm long, with an enlarged throat, and five obovate lobes, as long as the tube. The stamens are inserted into the throat of the corolla tube. The anthers are exerted (protrude outside the tube, unlike T. jasminoides). The hairless ovary consists of two carpels. Flowering takes place from late spring to summer.

The fruit consists of two linear follicles, 10–30 by 0.3–0.5 cm. The seeds are oblong with at one end a 3.5 cm egret.

== Range ==
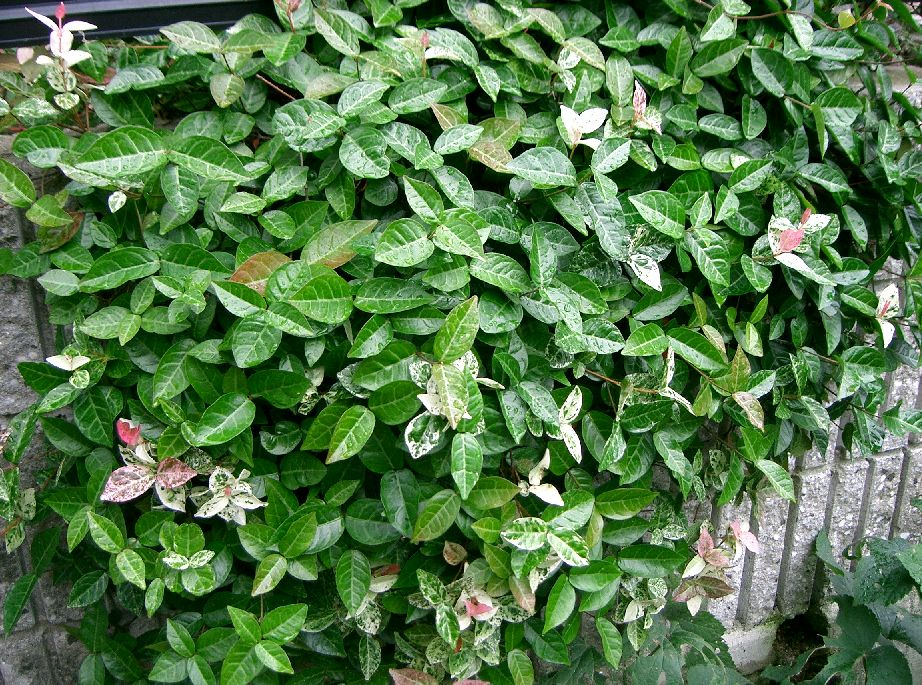
Variegated variety

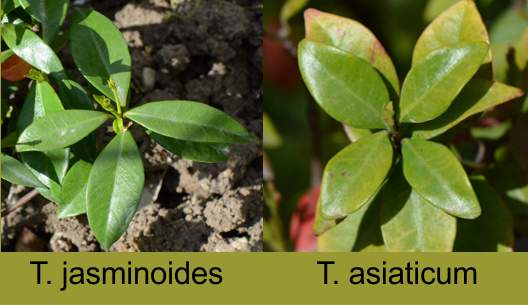
Comparison of T. jasminoides and T. asiaticum

Trachelospermum asiaticum is native to China, India, Japan, Korea, Indo-China and Malaysia. It grows in mountain forests and scrub, often attached to trees.

== Cultivation ==
Quite similar to the false jasmine Trachelospermum jasminoides, T. asiaticum produces flowers with a slightly smaller yellow or cream heart. It has faster growth in the early years. It provides an evergreen ornamental ground cover, or, as a liana, planted along a wall or trellis, in semi-shade or sunny exposure, providing intense fragrance during the flowering period in summer. It can withstand brief frosts down to -15 °C.

It has gained the Royal Horticultural Society's Award of Garden Merit.

There are several cultivars with various patterns of variegation and also dwarf varieties.

== Chemical composition ==
Many flavonoids were extracted from the leaves of Trachelospermum asiaticum var. intermedium: apigenin 7-Oglucoside, luteolin, luteolin-4, rhoifolin, lonicerine, kaempferol 3-O-rhamnoside, quercitrin, and phenolic compounds such as lignan and chlorogenic acid.

Of triterpenes oleanolic type were also detected: the acid 2α, 3β, 19α, 23,24-pentahydroxyoléan-12-en-28-oic acid or trachélospérogénine E 8.
