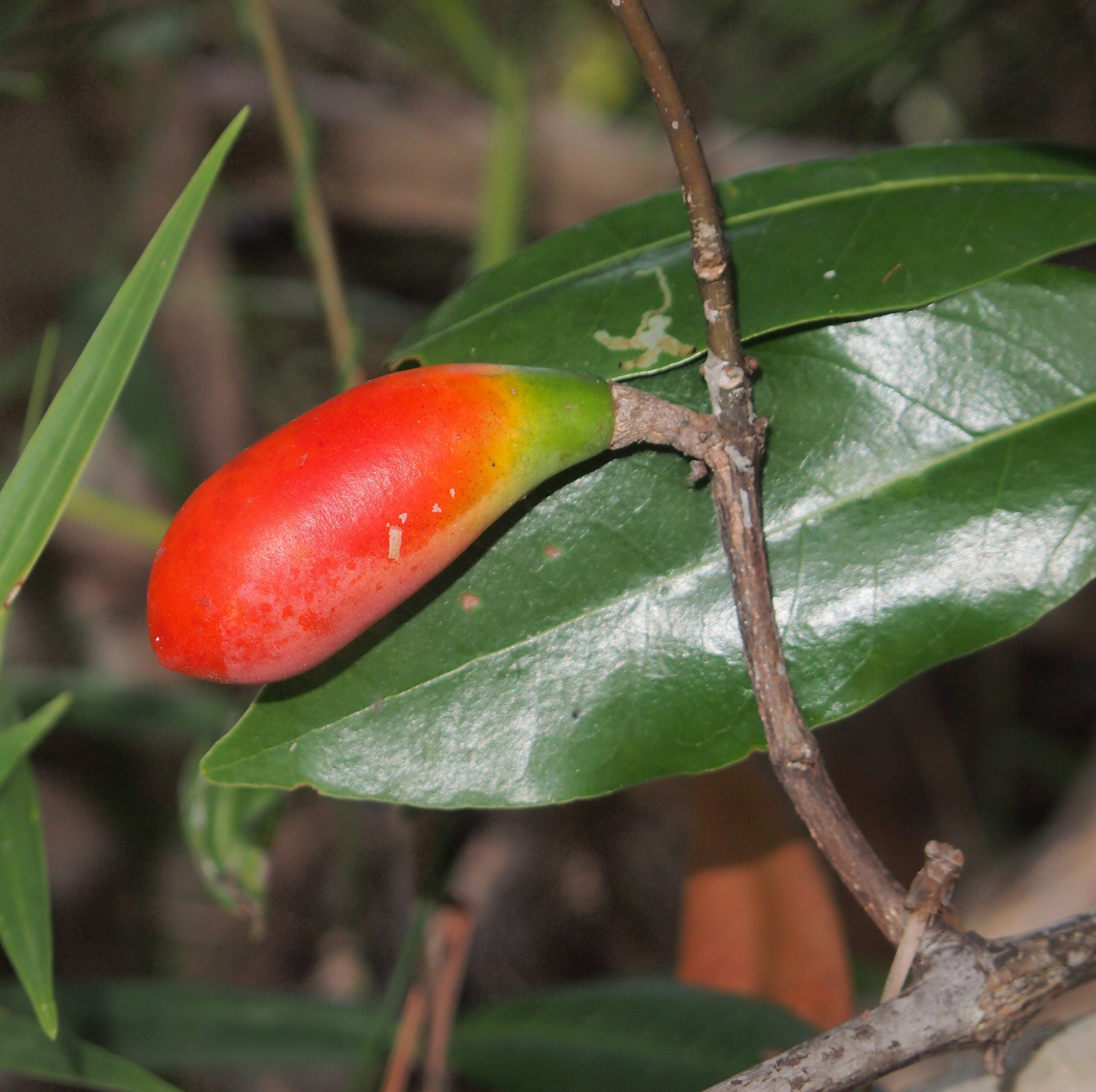

Scientific classification
- Kingdom: Plantae
- Clade: Tracheophytes
- Clade: Angiosperms
- Clade: Eudicots
- Clade: Asterids
- Order: Gentianales
- Family: Apocynaceae
- Subfamily: Rauvolfioideae
- Tribe: Melodineae
- Genus: Melodinus; J. R. Forst. & G. Forst.

Synonyms
- Bicorona A. DC. in A. P. de Candolle; Clitandropsis S. Moore; Echaltium Wight; Lycimnia Hance in W. G. Walpers; Neowollastonia Wernham ex Ridl.; Oncinus Lour.; Pseudo-willughbeia Markgr.; Rhytileucoma F.Muell.; Trichostomanthemum Domin

= Melodinus =

Genus of plants

Melodinus is a genus of plant in the family Apocynaceae, first described as a genus in 1776. It is native to Indomalaya, Meganesia and various islands in the western Pacific. A type of monoterpenoid indole alkaloids called melodinines can be isolated from Melodinus plants.

== Species ==
Accepted species include:

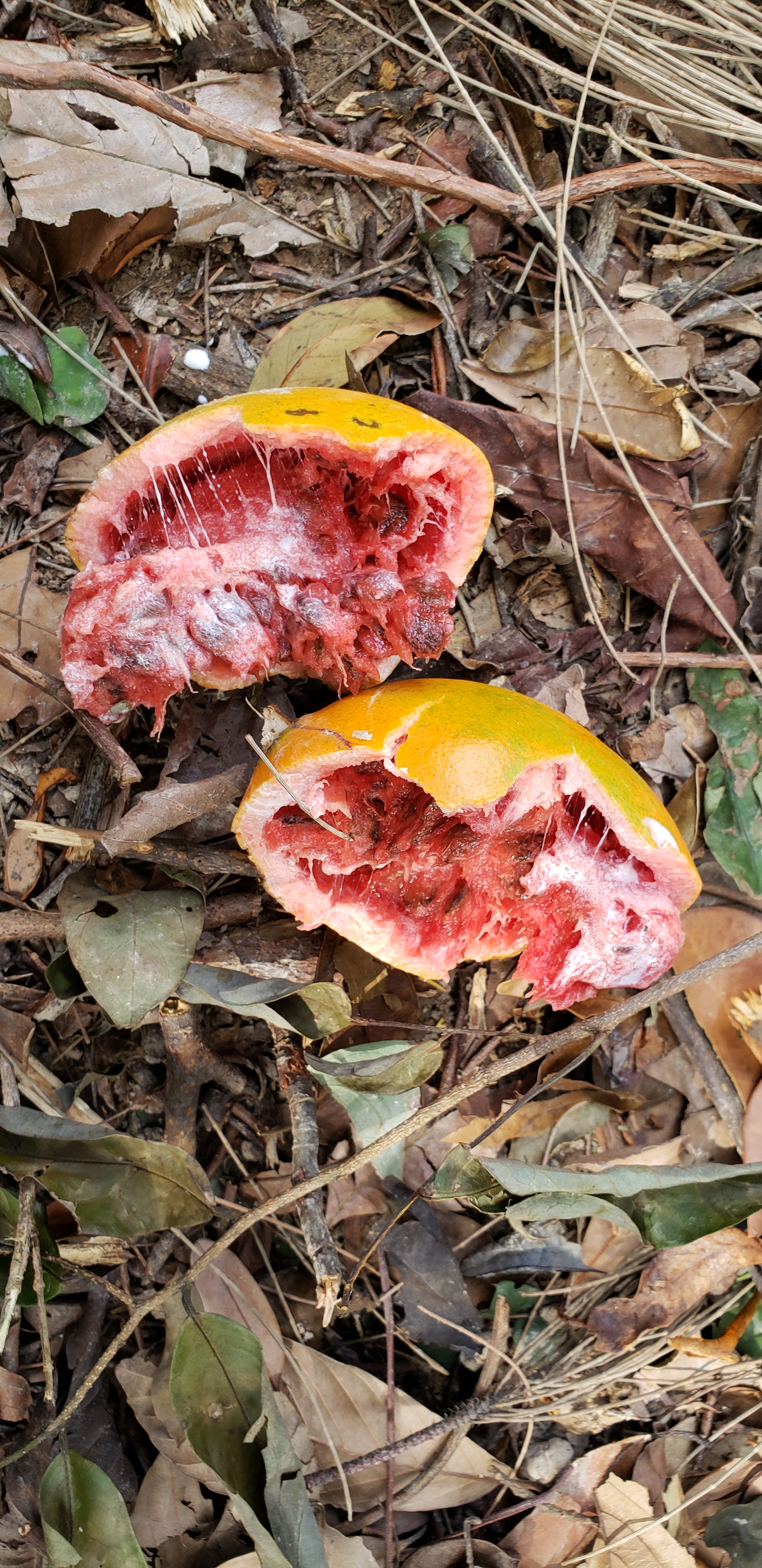
Fruit of Melodinus suaveolens

1. Melodinus acutiflorus F. Muell. - Papua New Guinea, Queensland, New South Wales
2. Melodinus aeneus Baill. - New Caledonia
3. Melodinus angustifolius Hayata - Taiwan, N Vietnam
4. Melodinus australis (F. Muell.) Pierre - New Guinea, Queensland, New South Wales, Northern Territory, Solomon Islands, Bismarck Archipelago, Vanuatu
5. Melodinus axillaris W. T. Wang - Yunnan
6. Melodinus balansae Baill. - New Caledonia
7. Melodinus baueri Endl. - E Kalimantan, Papua New Guinea, Norfolk Island
8. Melodinus cochinchinensis (Lour.) Merr. - Indochina, W Malaysia, E Himalayas (Assam, Bhutan, Bangladesh, etc.), Yunnan
9. Melodinus cumingii A. DC. - Philippines
10. Melodinus densistriatus Markgr. - New Guinea
11. Melodinus forbesii Fawc. - Bali, Lombok, Timor, Flores, Maluku, Sulawesi, New Guinea
12. Melodinus fusiformis Champ. ex Benth. - China (Guangdong, Guangxi, Guizhou), Indochina, Luzon
13. Melodinus glaber Turrill - Vanuatu, Fiji
14. Melodinus honbaensis A. Chev. ex Pit. - S Vietnam
15. Melodinus insularis (Markgr.) Fosberg - Palau
16. Melodinus orientalis Blume - Thailand, W Malaysia, Borneo, Java, Lesser Sunda Islands, Sumatra, Sulawesi, Philippines
17. Melodinus philippensis A.DC. - Mindoro
18. Melodinus philliraeoides Labill. - New Caledonia
19. Melodinus reticulatus Boiteau - New Caledonia
20. Melodinus scandens J. R. Forst & G. Forst. - New Caledonia
21. Melodinus suaveolens (Hance) Champ. ex Benth. - Guangdong, Hong Kong, Hainan, Guangxi, Vietnam
22. Melodinus tenuicaudatus Tsiang & P. T. Li - Yunnan, Guizhou, Guangxi
23. Melodinus vitiensis Rolfe - Loyalty Islands, Fiji, Tonga, Samoa, Vanuatu
