= Melodinus acutiflorus =

Scientific classification
- Kingdom: Plantae
- Clade: Tracheophytes
- Clade: Angiosperms
- Clade: Eudicots
- Clade: Asterids
- Order: Gentianales
- Family: Apocynaceae
- Genus: Melodinus
- Species: M. acutiflorus

Binomial name
- Melodinus acutiflorus F.Muell.

Species of plant

Melodinus acutiflorus is a species of vine, commonly named white-flowered melodinus, byamurra, or merangarra and constituting part of the plant family Apocynaceae. They grow naturally in Papua New Guinea, Queensland and New South Wales in Australia.

The species was formally described in 1857 by Victorian government botanist Ferdinand von Mueller based on plant material found in the vicinity of the Brisbane River.
