= Melodinus axillaris =

Conservation status
- Vulnerable (IUCN 3.1)

Scientific classification
- Kingdom: Plantae
- Clade: Tracheophytes
- Clade: Angiosperms
- Clade: Eudicots
- Clade: Asterids
- Order: Gentianales
- Family: Apocynaceae
- Genus: Melodinus
- Species: M. axillaris

Binomial name
- Melodinus axillaris W.T.Wang

Species of plant

Melodinus axillaris is a species of plant in the family Apocynaceae. It is endemic to Yunnan Province in southern China.
