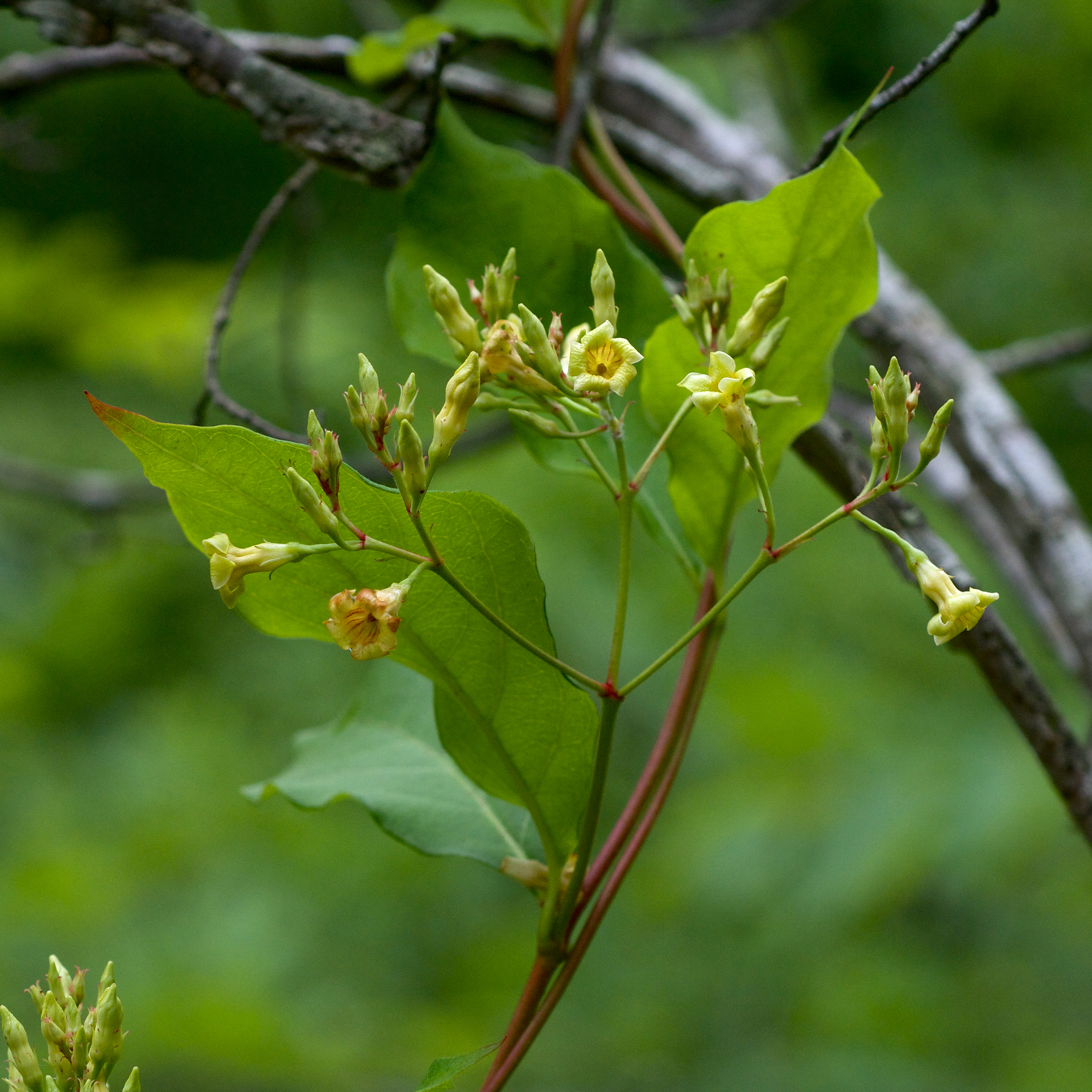

Scientific classification
- Kingdom: Plantae
- Clade: Tracheophytes
- Clade: Angiosperms
- Clade: Eudicots
- Clade: Asterids
- Order: Gentianales
- Family: Apocynaceae
- Subfamily: Apocynoideae
- Tribe: Odontadenieae
- Genus: Thyrsanthella (Baill.) Pichon
- Species: T. difformis

Binomial name
- Thyrsanthella difformis (Walter) Pichon

Synonyms
- Trachelospermum difforme (Walter) A.Gray

= Thyrsanthella =

Genus of flowering plants

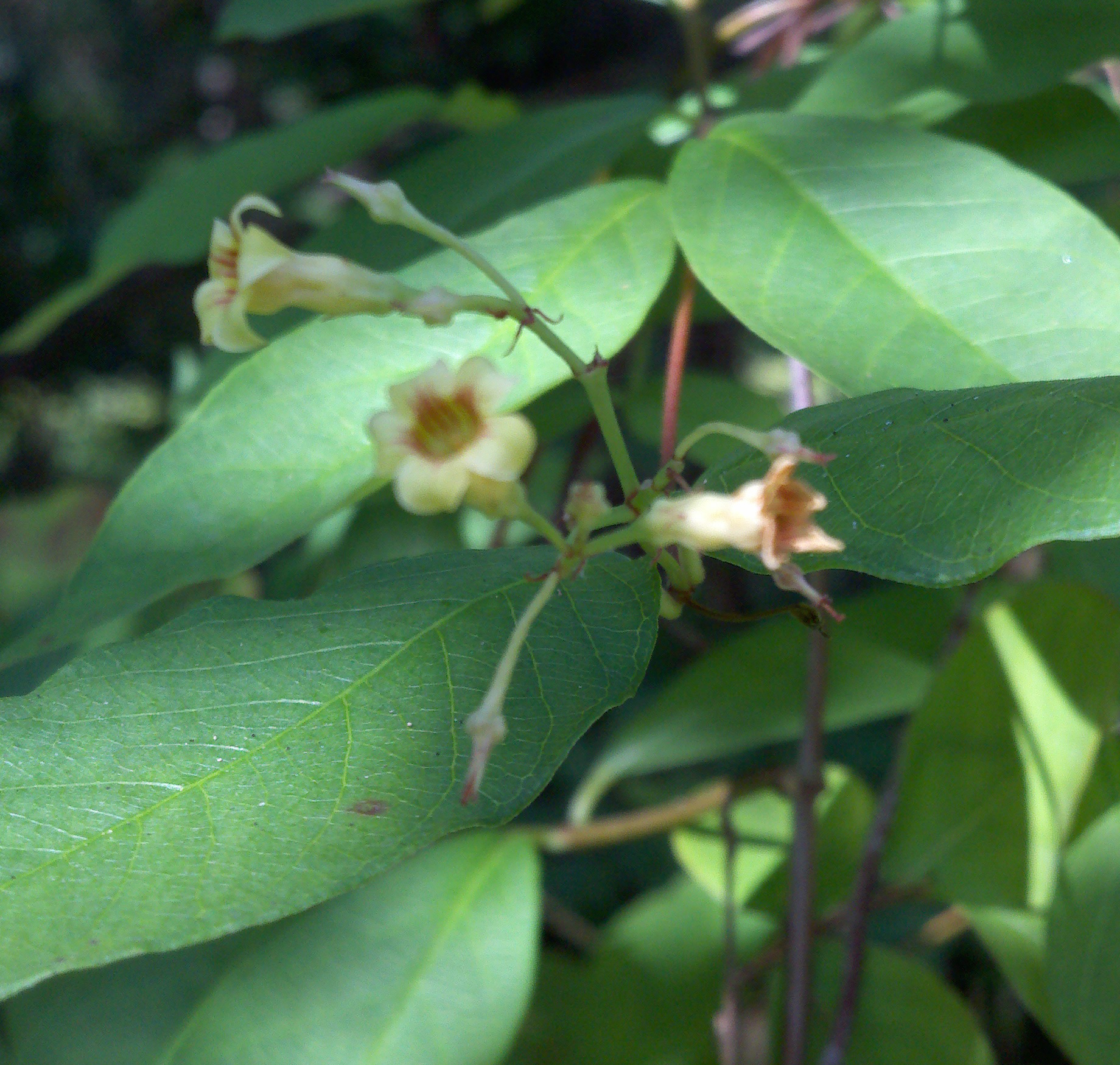
Thyrsanthella difformis flower

Thyrsanthella is a monotypic genus of flowering plants belonging to the family Apocynaceae. Its only species, Thyrsanthella difformis, the climbing dogbane. It is an uncommon to locally common deciduous low-growing woody vine native to the southeastern United States, found more often though not exclusively in moist habitats.

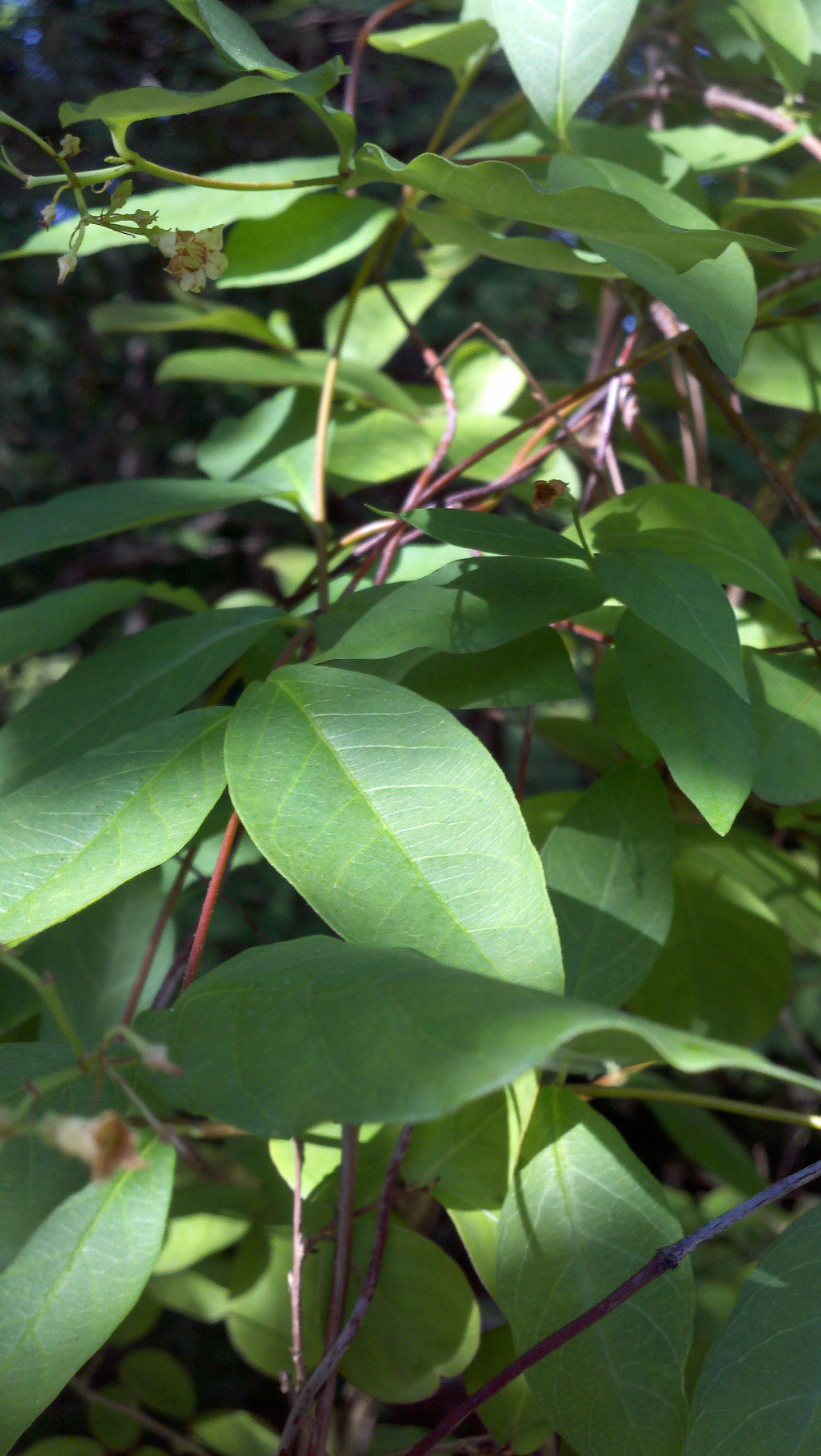
T. difformis leaves and flower, Chatham County NC, 16 June 2015

== Description ==
Thyrsanthella difformis is a deciduous low-growing woody twining vine in the dogbane family. Its leaves are opposite, entire, acuminate, and have variable shape. White to creamy yellow flowers, lacking a corona, corolla lobes 3–4 mm long, appear May to July. Reddish fruit are follicles 10–25 cm long, 1–2 mm in diameter that appear July through September.

== Identification ==
The variable leaf shape may make identification challenging in some cases, particularly if the narrow-leaf form is first encountered. Also, T. difformis may be confused with trumpet honeysuckle, alien Japanese honeysuckle, or Carolina jessamine. Distinguish T. difformis in the field from these plants by observing that only T. difformis exudes milky sap from broken stems or the central vein of torn leaves. It may be distinguished from the alien confederate jasmine, formerly in the same genus, by the unassuming pale yellow flowers of the native species contrasting to the showy white flowers of the introduced vine.

== Taxonomy ==
This species was traditionally included in the genus Trachelospermum. Molecular and physical taxonomic evidence place it instead in the monospecific genus Thyrsanthella. The specific name derives from the variable leaf shape.

== Toxicity ==
One source reports that all parts of this plant are poisonous if ingested.
