= Epigynum auritum =

Scientific classification
- Kingdom: Plantae
- Clade: Tracheophytes
- Clade: Angiosperms
- Clade: Eudicots
- Clade: Asterids
- Order: Gentianales
- Family: Apocynaceae
- Genus: Epigynum
- Species: E. auritum

Binomial name
- Epigynum auritum (Schneid.) Tsiang & P.T.Li

Synonyms
- Trachelospermum auritum C.K.Schneid.; Trachelospermum curtisii King & Gamble 1908 not Epigynum curtisii King & Gamble 1908; Epigynum lachnocarpum Pichon

Species of plant

Epigynum auritum is a plant species in the genus Epigynum. It is native to Yunnan Province in China, as well as Assam State in India, Laos, Thailand, Myanmar (Burma), and the Peninsular region of Malaysia.

The flavanol epigeoside (Catechin-3-O-alpha-L-rhamnopyranosyl-(1-4)-beta-D-glucopyranosyl-(1-6)-beta-D-glucopyranoside) can be isolated from the rhizomes of E. auritum.
