= Melodinus fusiformis =

Conservation status
- Vulnerable (IUCN 3.1)

Scientific classification
- Kingdom: Plantae
- Clade: Tracheophytes
- Clade: Angiosperms
- Clade: Eudicots
- Clade: Asterids
- Order: Gentianales
- Family: Apocynaceae
- Genus: Melodinus
- Species: M. fusiformis

Binomial name
- Melodinus fusiformis Champ. ex Benth.

Synonyms
- Melodinus yunnanensis Tsiang & P.T.Li; Melodinus cambodiensis Pierre; Melodinus hemsleyanus Diels; Melodinus seguinii H.Lév.; Melodinus edulis H.Lév.; Melodinus esquirolii H.Lév.; Melodinus flavus H.Lév.; Melodinus fulvus H.Lév.; Trachelospermum esquirolii H.Lév.; Melodinus lanceolatus Merr.; Melodinus erianthus Pit.; Melodinus magnificus Tsiang; Melodinus wrightioides Hand.-Mazz.; Melodinus morsei Tsiang; Melodinus brachyphyllus Merr.

Species of plant

Melodinus fusiformis is a species of plant in the family Apocynaceae. It is native to China (Guangdong, Guangxi, Guizhou), Indochina, and the Island of Luzon in the Philippines.
