= Magnolia oblonga =

Conservation status
- Least Concern (IUCN 3.1)

Scientific classification
- Kingdom: Plantae
- Clade: Embryophytes
- Clade: Tracheophytes
- Clade: Spermatophytes
- Clade: Angiosperms
- Clade: Magnoliids
- Order: Magnoliales
- Family: Magnoliaceae
- Genus: Magnolia
- Subgenus: Magnolia subg. Yulania
- Section: Magnolia sect. Michelia
- Subsection: Magnolia subsect. Michelia
- Species: M. oblonga

Binomial name
- Magnolia oblonga (Wall. ex Hook.f. & Thomson) Figlar

Synonyms
- Michelia oblonga Wall. ex Hook.f. & Thomson; Michelia tsiampacca var. oblonga (Wall. ex Hook.f. & Thomson) P.Parm.; Sampacca oblonga (Wall. ex Hook.f. & Thomson) Kuntze; Michelia lactea Buch.-Ham. ex Wall.

Species of tree

Magnolia oblonga, also known as borsopa, ful-sopa, or kothal-sopa, is a tree species native to the Northeastern region of India. It can grow up to 50 meters high and is usually buttressed at the base.

== Description ==
The leaves of Magnolia oblonga are oblanceolate, obovate-oblong, acute at the base, shortly acuminate at the apex, and coriaceous. They are 8-15 centimeters long and 4-6 centimeters wide, shiny on the upper surface, and glaucous on the lower surface. The lateral nerves are 10-12 pairs, and the tertiaries are laxly reticulate, conspicuous on both surfaces. The petioles are 1.5-2.5 centimeters long and swollen at the base, while the stipules are narrowly oblong and as long as the petiole. The bark is grey, rough, warty, and about 2-4 centimeters thick, with an aromatic scent.

Magnolia oblonga produces axillary solitary flowers that are white, scarcely scented, and have short, annulate pedicels. The buds are ovoid, elongate, and about 2.5 centimeters long. The perianth parts are 12, white, fading to pale yellow, and narrowly obovate-lanceolate, about 2.5-3.5 centimeters long. The species has about 50 stamens, with filaments that are about 2.5 millimeters long and anthers that are 1.5-2 centimeters long. The carpels are ovoid, about 1.25 x 1 millimeters, and glabrous. Magnolia oblonga produces 40 or more carpels, and the stylar crest is as long as the ovary.

The fruiting receptacle of Magnolia oblonga can grow up to 15 centimeters long. The ripe carpels are sessile, lax, obovoid, about 20 x 12 millimeters, woody, lenticellate, beaked, and speckled. The species blooms from February to May and produces fruits from July to October.

== Habitat and distribution ==
Magnolia oblonga is native to Assam, Meghalaya, and Arunachal Pradesh states in northeastern India, where it grows in montane subtropical evergreen moist forests from 1200 to 2,200 metres elevation. It was first described by Wallich ex Hook. f. & Thomson in Fl. Ind. in 1855 and later in Fl. Brit. India in 1872. The species is also known by other names, like bewa-champhe and chambi-sirsang in the Garo language and dieng-ta-rai in the Khmer language.
