= Epigynum (plant) =

Scientific classification
- Kingdom: Plantae
- Clade: Tracheophytes
- Clade: Angiosperms
- Clade: Eudicots
- Clade: Asterids
- Order: Gentianales
- Family: Apocynaceae
- Subfamily: Apocynoideae
- Tribe: Apocyneae
- Genus: Epigynum; Wight

Species
- See text

Synonyms
- Argyronerium Pit.; Legouixia Van Heurck & Müll.Arg.; Nouettea Pierre

Genus of plants

Epigynum is a genus of plant in the family Apocynaceae. It has 5 known species.

== Species ==
- Epigynum auritum
- Epigynum cochinchinensis
- Epigynum graciliflorum
- Epigynum griffithianum
- Epigynum ridleyi
