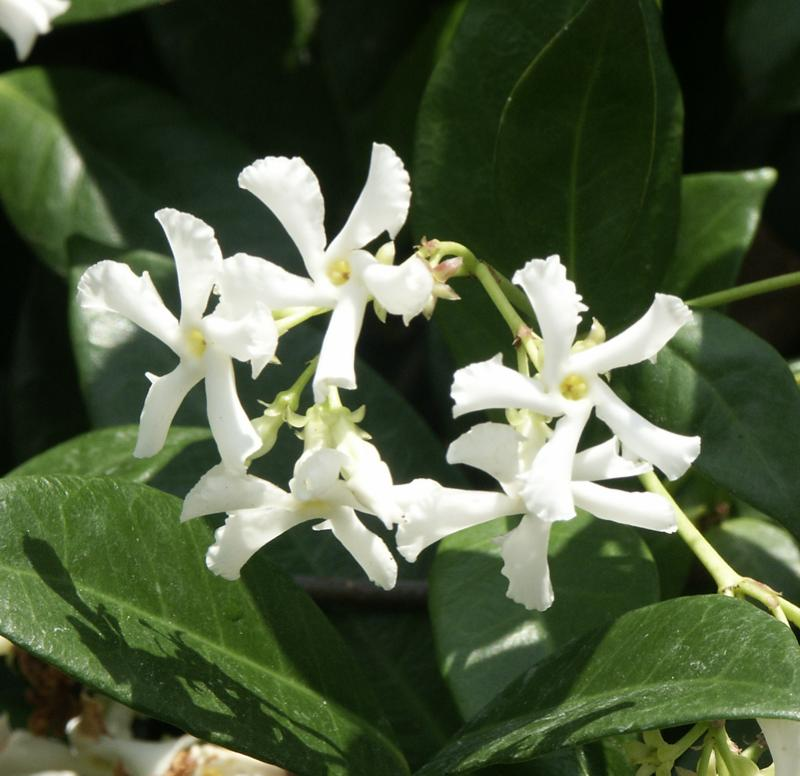

Scientific classification
- Kingdom: Plantae
- Clade: Tracheophytes
- Clade: Angiosperms
- Clade: Eudicots
- Clade: Asterids
- Order: Gentianales
- Family: Apocynaceae
- Genus: Trachelospermum
- Species: T. jasminoides

Binomial name
- Trachelospermum jasminoides (Lindl.) Lem.

Synonyms
- Rhynchospermum jasminoides Lindl.

= Trachelospermum jasminoides =

Species of vine

Trachelospermum jasminoides is a species of flowering plant in the family Apocynaceae, native to eastern and southeastern Asia (Japan, Korea, southern China and Vietnam). Common names include Confederate jasmine, star jasmine, Confederate jessamine, and Chinese star jessamine.

This plant, and the variegated cultivar 'Variegatum', have gained the Royal Horticultural Society's Award of Garden Merit.

== Description ==
Trachelospermum jasminoides is an evergreen woody liana growing to 3 m (10 ft) high. When they meet a wet surface, they emit aerial weed roots, otherwise they surround the support (they are twining). If cut, like most Apocynaceae, they exude a white latex, resembling sticky milk. Young twigs, initially pubescent, become glabrous with age. The leaves are opposite, oval to lanceolate, 2–10 cm (3/4–3 7/8 in) long and 1–4.5 cm (3/8–1 3/4 in) broad, with an entire margin and an acuminate apex. Dark green in summer, the leaves turn bronze in winter.

The fragrant flowers, which are borne in spring to early summer, are white, 1–2 cm (3/8–3/4 in) diameter, with a tube-like corolla opening out into five petal-like lobes. The white, rotate actinomorphic flowers have a calyx formed by five narrow, smooth, reflexed sepals 2−5 mm, much shorter than the corolla tube. The latter has a dilated tube in the middle, 5−10 mm long, terminating in 5 obliquely bypassed lobes, all curved, resembling a helix turning counterclockwise. The five stamens are inserted in the middle of the corolla tube.

== Cultivation ==
Trachelospermum jasminoides is commonly grown as an ornamental plant and houseplant. In gardens, public landscapes, and parks it is used as a climbing vine, a groundcover, and a fragrant potted plant on terraces and patios. It will flower in full sun, partial shade, or total shade, and requires well-drained soil (if constantly kept damp it may succumb to fungal infection), moderate water, moderate fertilizer, and a climbing structure (whether a trellis or another plant is secondary). Propagation is most commonly done with cuttings/clones.

It is widely planted in California and also particularly in the Southeastern United States, where its hardiness is confined to USDA Zones 8–10.

=== Nomenclature ===
Dictionaries (such as Merriam-Webster and dictionary.com) suggest that the name confederate jasmine comes from the plant's common cultivation in the southern United States.

It gets another of its common names, trader's compass, from an old Uzbekistan saying that it pointed traders in the right direction, provided they were of good character. It is also called star jasmine in Europe and Chinese jasmine or Chinese ivy in Asia.

== Uses ==
A valuable perfume oil is extracted from the steam distilled or tinctured flowers and used in high end perfumery. In a dilute form, tinctured flowers are much used in Chinese, Vietnamese and Thai incenses. A bast fibre is produced from the stems.

== Chemical constituents ==
Five indole alkaloids; coronaridine, voacangine, apparicine, conoflorine, and 19-epi-voacangarine have been reported.

== Gallery ==
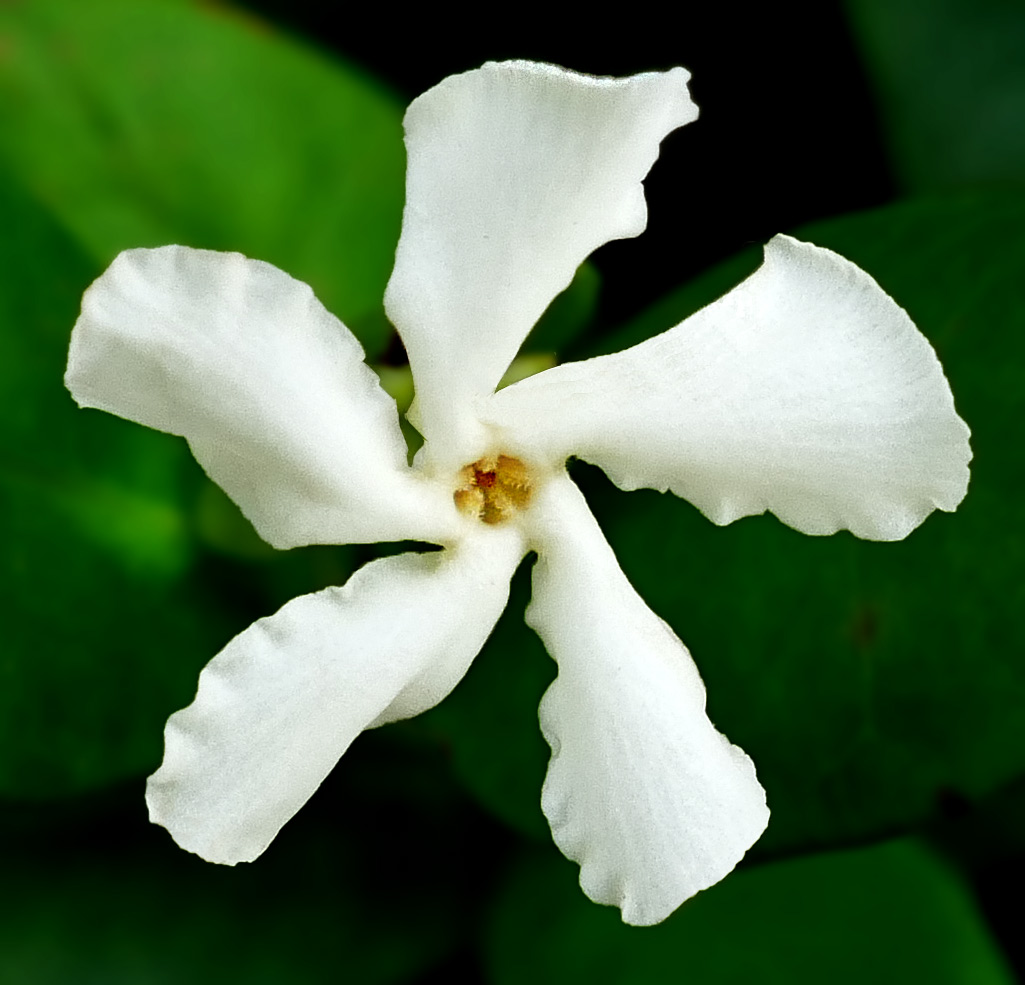
Confederate jasmine flower, close

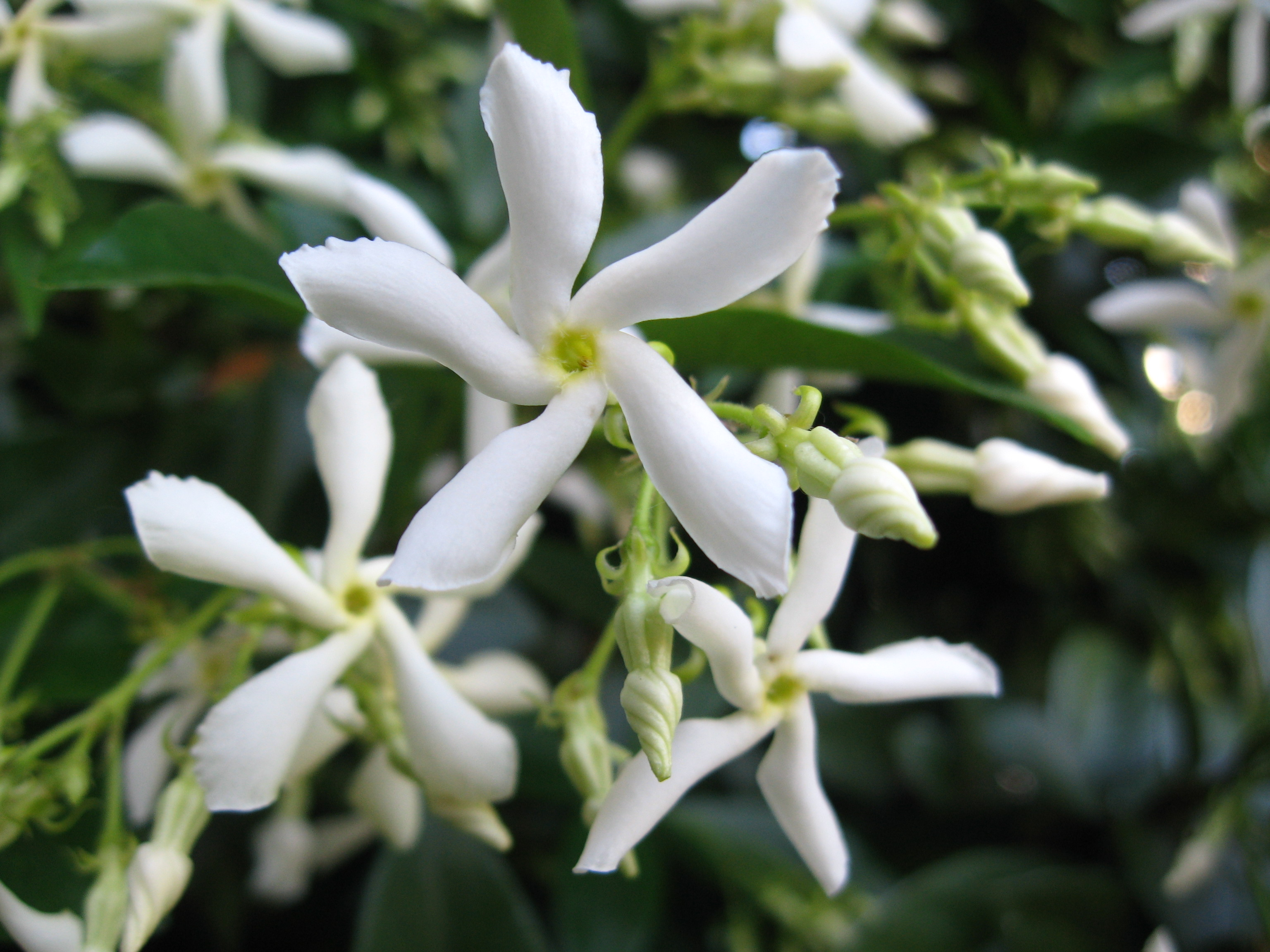
Flower close-up

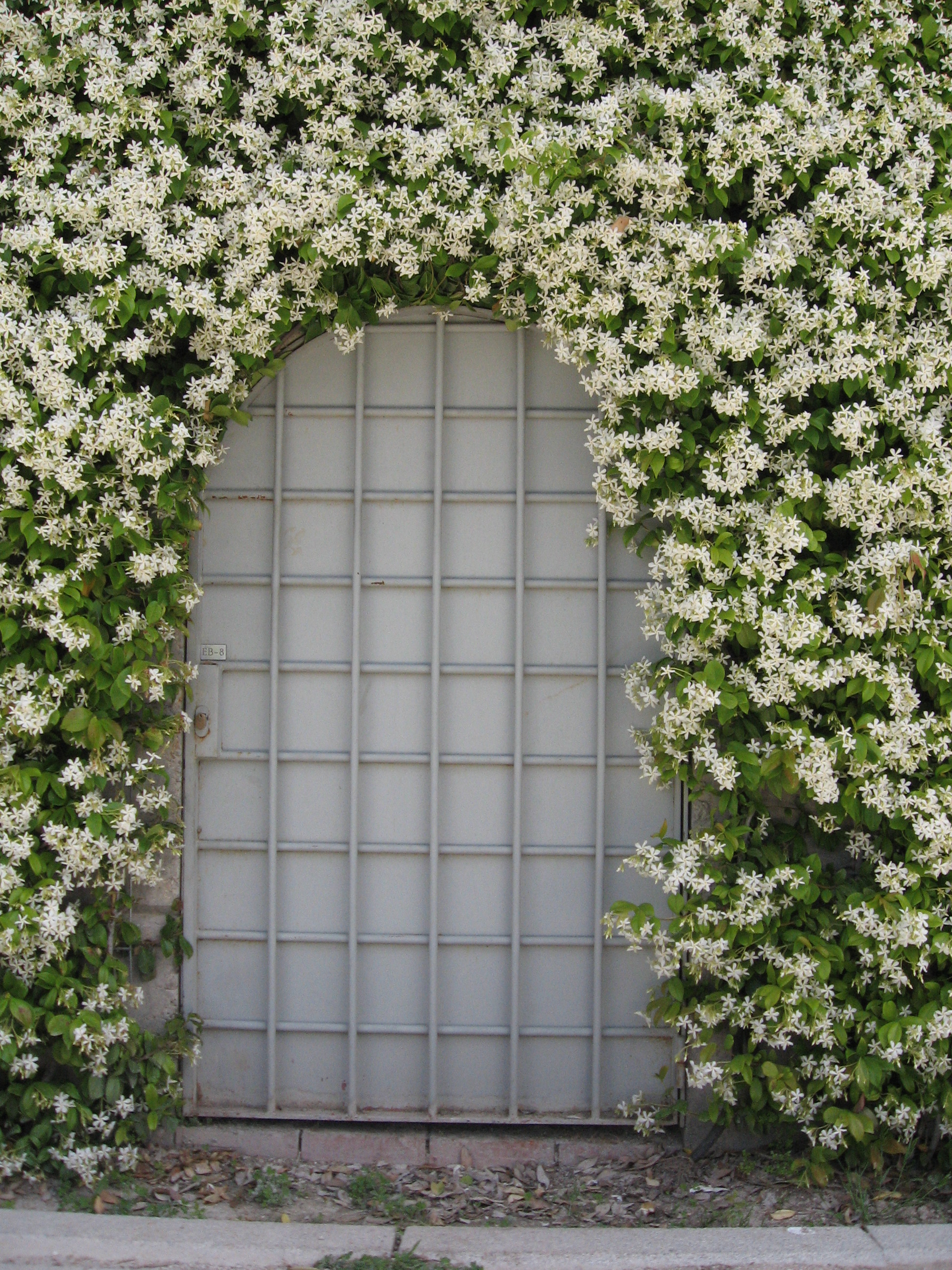
Blooming on trellis

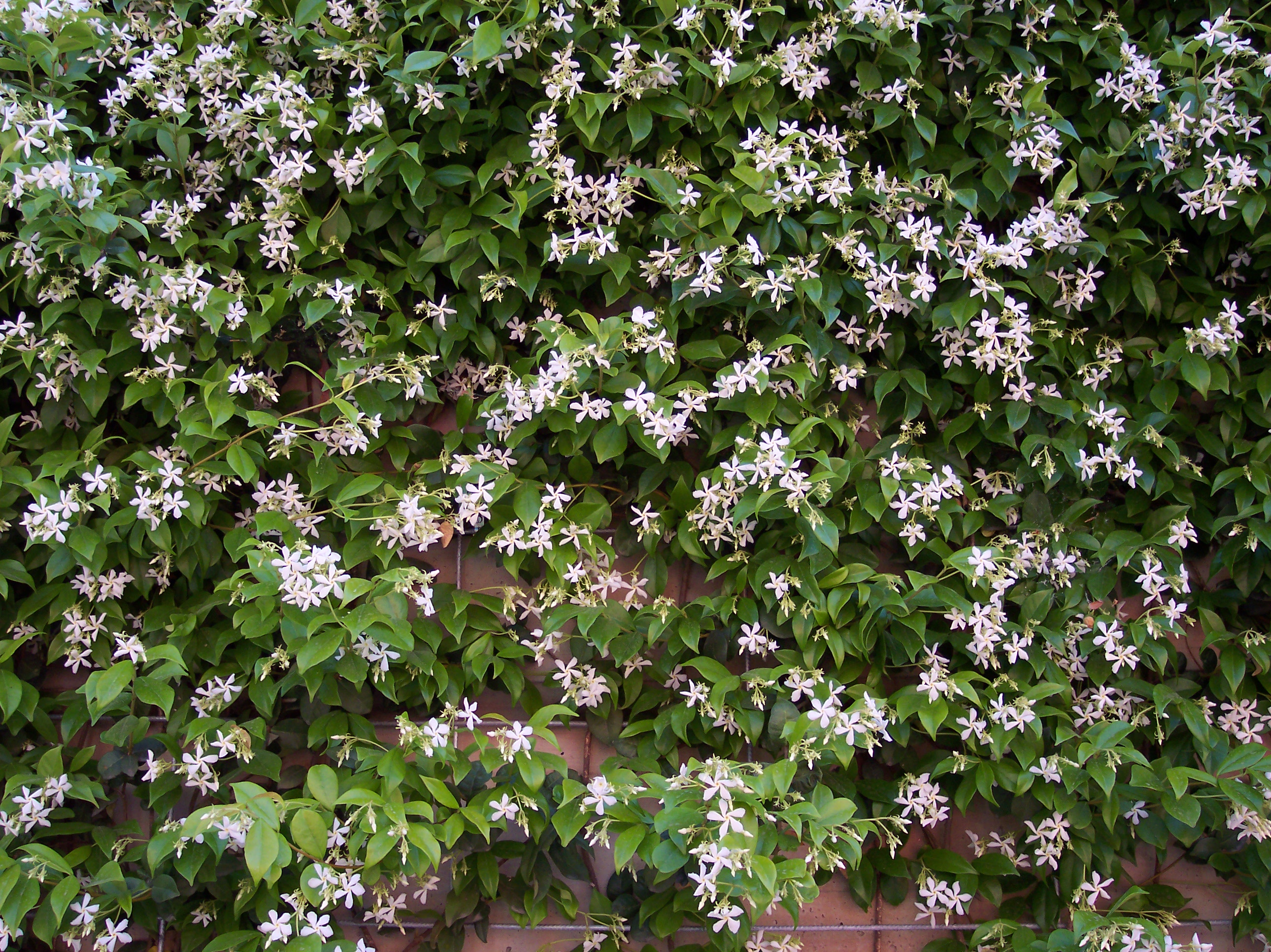
Trained on garden wall

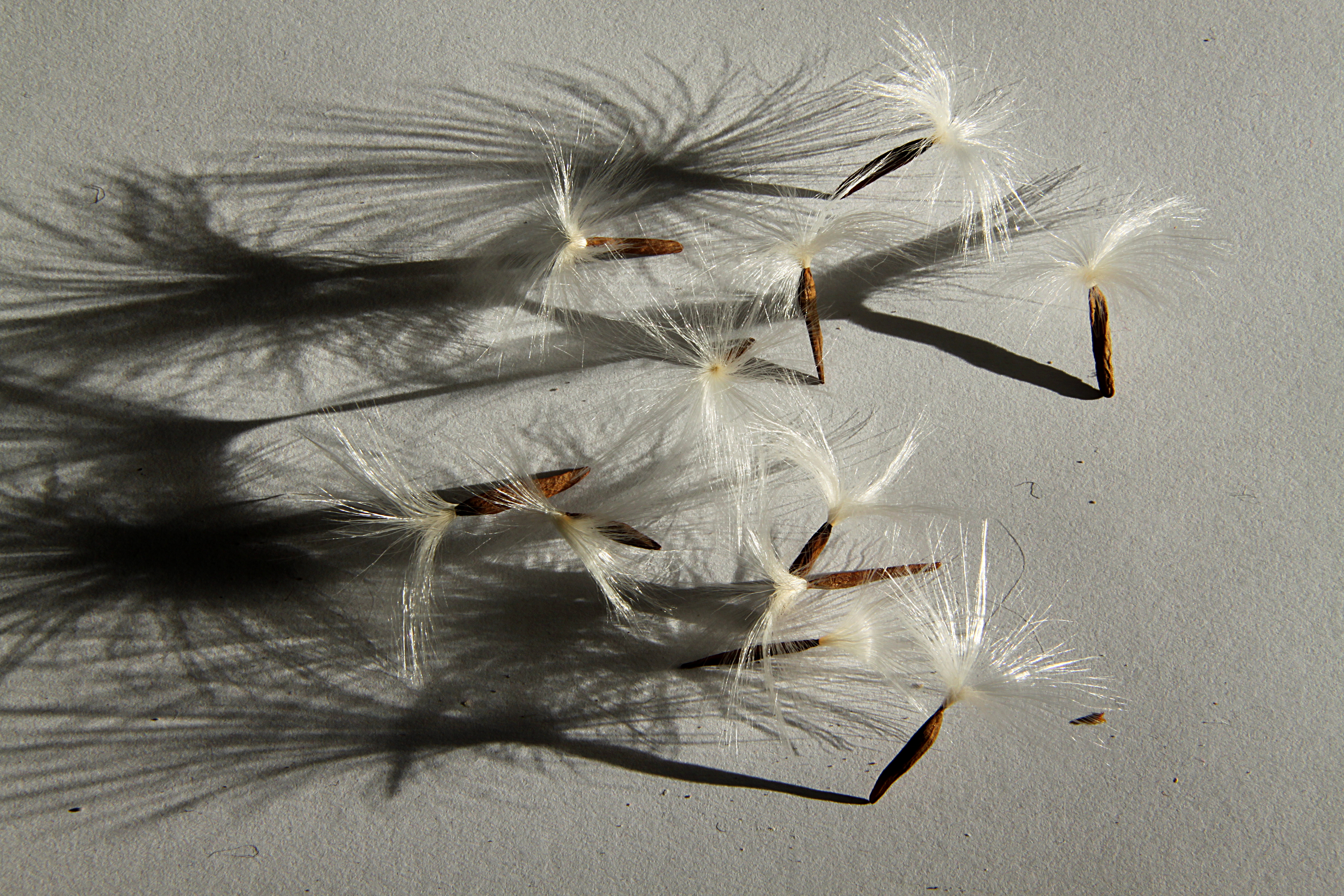
Seeds

== See also ==
- Gelsemium sempervirens, also called Confederate jessamine or jasmine.
