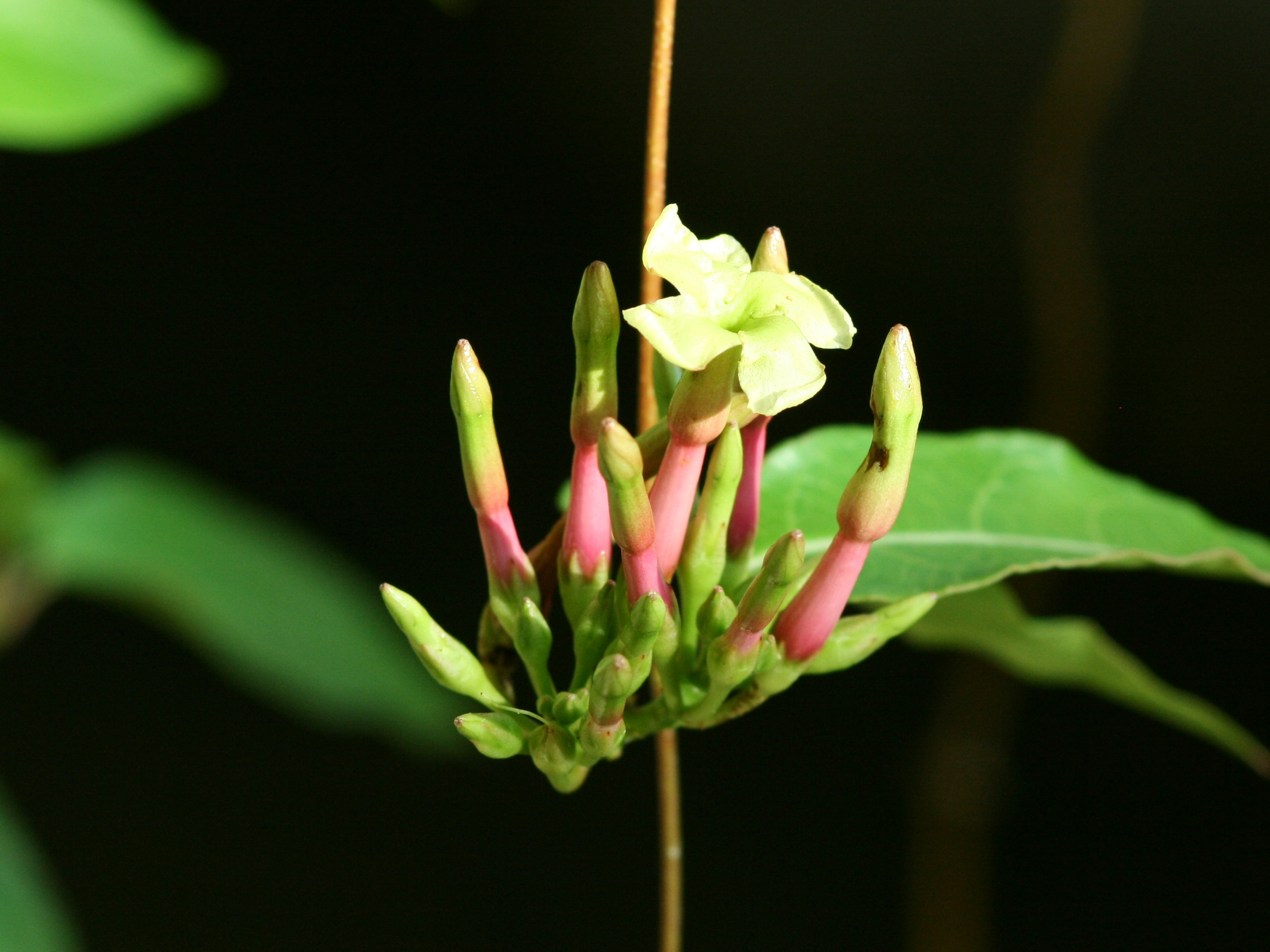
- Mesechites trifidus

Scientific classification
- Kingdom: Plantae
- Clade: Tracheophytes
- Clade: Angiosperms
- Clade: Eudicots
- Clade: Asterids
- Order: Gentianales
- Family: Apocynaceae
- Subfamily: Apocynoideae
- Tribe: Mesechiteae
- Genus: Mesechites; Müll.Arg.

= Mesechites =

Genus of plants

Mesechites is a genus of plants in the family Apocynaceae first described as a genus in 1860. It is native to Mexico, Central America, South America, and the West Indies.

Species

1. Mesechites acuminatus (Ruiz & Pav.) Müll.Arg. - Peru
2. Mesechites angustifolius (Poir.) Miers - Hispaniola
3. Mesechites citrifolius (Kunth) Woodson - Colombia
4. Mesechites mansoanus (A.DC.) Woodson - Paraguay, Brazil
5. Mesechites minimus (Britton & P.Wilson) Woodson - Cuba
6. Mesechites repens (Jacq.) Miers - Hispaniola, Navassa Island, Jamaica
7. Mesechites roseus (A.DC.) Miers - Cuba
8. Mesechites trifidus (Jacq.) Müll.Arg. - widespread from Tamaulipas in NE Mexico south to Paraguay + N Argentina

formerly included

1. Mesechites andrieuxii (Müll.Arg.) Miers = Mandevilla convolvulacea (A.DC.) Hemsl.
2. Mesechites angustatus Miers = Mandevilla benthamii (A.DC.) K.Schum.
3. Mesechites brownei (A.DC.) Miers = Mandevilla torosa (Jacq.) Woodson
4. Mesechites dichotomus (Kunth) Miers = Laubertia boissieri A.DC.
5. Mesechites guayaquilensis Miers = Mandevilla subsagittata (Ruiz & Pav.) Woodson
6. Mesechites guianensis (A.DC.) Miers = Mandevilla rugellosa (Rich.) L.Allorge
7. Mesechites hastatus Miers = Mandevilla subsagittata (Ruiz & Pav.) Woodson
8. Mesechites hirtellulus Miers = Mandevilla oaxacana (A.DC.) Hemsl.
9. Mesechites hirtellus (Kunth) Miers = Mandevilla subsagittata (Ruiz & Pav.) Woodson
10. Mesechites jasminiflorus (M.Martens & Galeotti) Miers = Mandevilla subsagittata (Ruiz & Pav.) Woodson
11. Mesechites lanceolatus (R.Br.) Miers = Parsonsia lanceolata R.Br.
12. Mesechites oaxacanus (A.DC.) Miers = Mandevilla oaxacana (A.DC.) Hemsl.
13. Mesechites ovalis (Ruiz & Pav. ex Markgr.) Pichon = Allomarkgrafia ovalis (Ruiz & Pav. ex Markgr.) Woodson
14. Mesechites plumeriiflorus (Woodson) Pichon = Allomarkgrafia plumeriiflora Woodson
15. Mesechites siphiliticus (L.f.) Lemée = Tabernaemontana siphilitica (L.f.) Leeuwenb.
16. Mesechites subcarnosus (Benth.) Miers = Mandevilla subcarnosa (Benth.) Woodson
17. Mesechites sulphureus (Vell.) Müll.Arg. = Prestonia coalita (Vell.) Woodson
18. Mesechites torulosus (L.) Miers = Mandevilla torosa (Jacq.) Woodson
