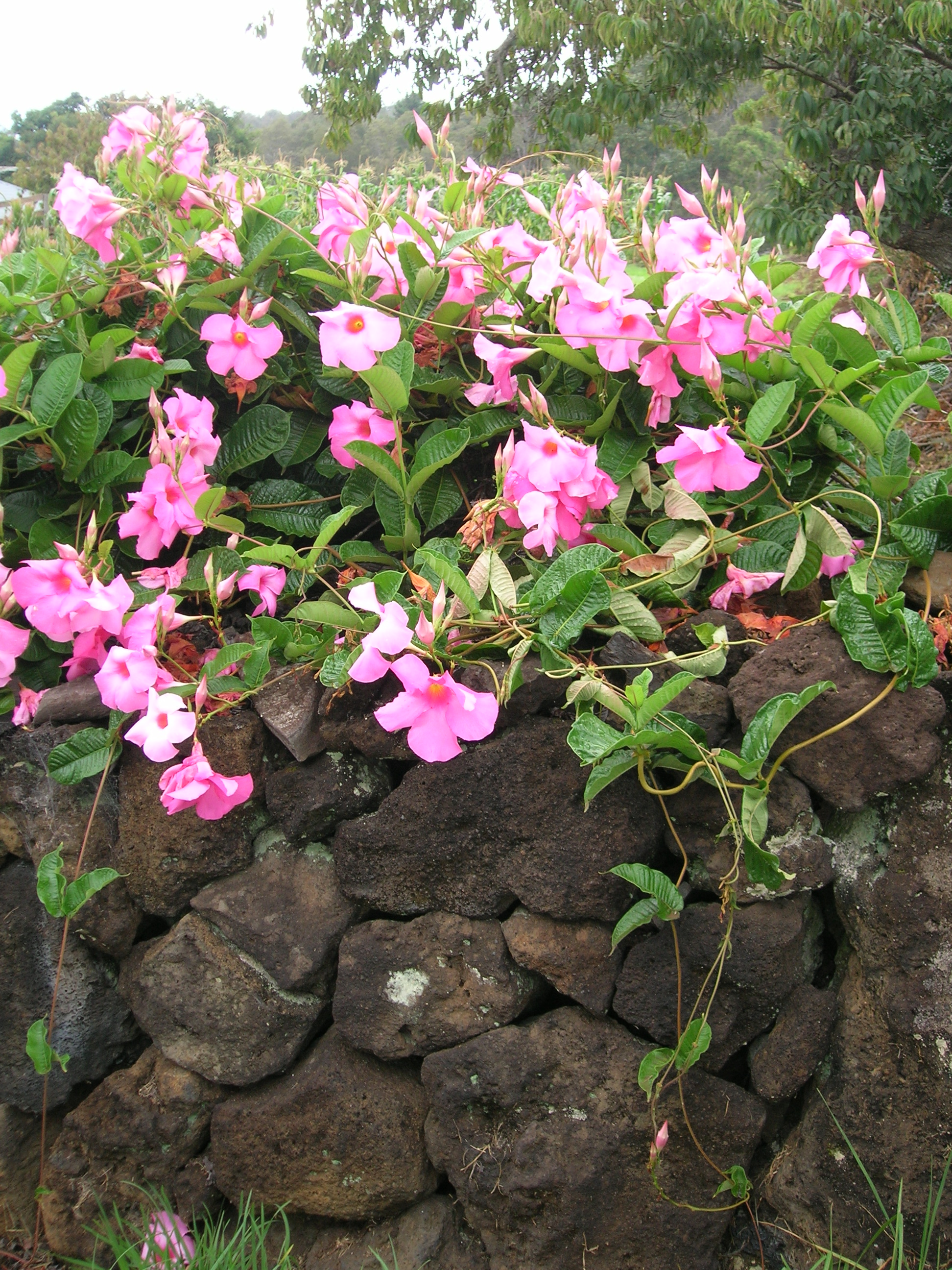

Scientific classification
- Kingdom: Plantae
- Clade: Tracheophytes
- Clade: Angiosperms
- Clade: Eudicots
- Clade: Asterids
- Order: Gentianales
- Family: Apocynaceae
- Genus: Mandevilla
- Species: M. × amabilis

Binomial name
- Mandevilla × amabilis (Backh. & Backh.f.) Dress

= Mandevilla × amabilis =

Hybrid species of flowering plant

Mandevilla × amabilis is a species of flowering plant in the family Apocynaceae. It was described in 1974 in the journal Baileya. Also known as Alice du Pont.

== Description ==
Evergreen climbing plant with opposite leaves of thick, rugose texture, with prominent venation. Flowers are pink with a yellow throat.

== Range ==
The species has no natural range, having originated in cultivation in the mid-19th century. It is thought to be a hybrid between Mandevilla splendens and another, unknown species. Conversely, one source says that it is a natural hybrid occurring in Brazil.

== Taxonomy ==
In a molecular analysis, M. × amabilis forms a sister clade to a complex that includes the natural species M. boliviensis and the Sundaville hybrids.
