= Allomarkgrafia =

Scientific classification
- Kingdom: Plantae
- Clade: Tracheophytes
- Clade: Angiosperms
- Clade: Eudicots
- Clade: Asterids
- Order: Gentianales
- Family: Apocynaceae
- Subfamily: Apocynoideae
- Tribe: Mesechiteae
- Genus: Allomarkgrafia; Woodson

Genus of flowering plants

Allomarkgrafia is a genus of flowering plants in the family Apocynaceae, first described as a genus in 1932. It is native to Central America and northwestern South America.

Species

- Allomarkgrafia brenesiana Woodson - Costa Rica, Panama
- Allomarkgrafia campanulata (Markgr. ex A.H.Gentry) J.F.Morales - Panama
- Allomarkgrafia ecuatoriana J.F. Morales - Colombia, Ecuador
- Allomarkgrafia foreroi A.H.Gentry - Colombia, Ecuador
- Allomarkgrafia insignis J.F.Morales - Costa Rica
- Allomarkgrafia laxiflora A.H.Gentry - Colombia, Ecuador
- Allomarkgrafia ovalis (Ruiz & Pav. ex Markgr.) Woodson - Peru
- Allomarkgrafia plumeriiflora Woodson - Costa Rica, Panama, Nicaragua, Honduras, Colombia
- Allomarkgrafia tubiflora Woodson ex Dwyer - Peru
