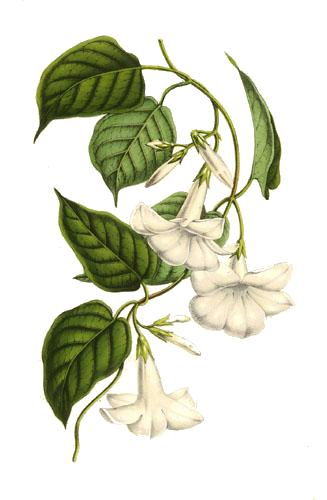
- Mandevilla laxa

Scientific classification
- Kingdom: Plantae
- Clade: Tracheophytes
- Clade: Angiosperms
- Clade: Eudicots
- Clade: Asterids
- Order: Gentianales
- Family: Apocynaceae
- Genus: Mandevilla
- Species: M. laxa

Binomial name
- Mandevilla laxa (Ruiz & Pav.) Woodson

Synonyms
- Amblyanthera bridgesii Müll.Arg.; Amblyanthera suaveolens (Lindl.) Müll.Arg.; Echites glandulosus Poir. nom. illeg.; Echites laxus Ruiz & Pav.; Echites suaveolens (Lindl.) A.DC.; Mandevilla bangii Rusby; Mandevilla bridgesii (Müll.Arg.) Woodson; Mandevilla mandonii Rusby; Mandevilla suaveolens Lindl.; Mandevilla tweedieana Stapf & Gadeceau

= Mandevilla laxa =

Chilean jasmine

Species of plant

Mandevilla laxa, commonly known as Chilean jasmine, is an ornamental plant in the genus Mandevilla of family Apocynaceae.

M. laxa is native to southern Ecuador, Peru, Bolivia, and northern Argentina. It grows as a vine and is deciduous in cool climates. It can grow to 6 meters (20 feet) tall. Masses of heavily scented white flowers are produced in the summer. As it is not fully hardy and does not survive being frozen, in temperate zones it must be grown with the protection of glass, in an unheated greenhouse or conservatory. with full sunlight. In the United Kingdom it has gained the Royal Horticultural Society's Award of Garden Merit.

Despite its common name 'Chilean jasmine', the species is not a true jasmine of the genus Jasminum.
