= Mandevilla sagittarii =

Scientific classification
- Kingdom: Plantae
- Clade: Tracheophytes
- Clade: Angiosperms
- Clade: Eudicots
- Clade: Asterids
- Order: Gentianales
- Family: Apocynaceae
- Genus: Mandevilla
- Species: M. sagittarii

Binomial name
- Mandevilla sagittarii Woodson

Synonyms
- Mandevilla dodsonii A.H.Gentry

Species of plant

Mandevilla sagittarii, synonym Mandevilla dodsonii, is a species of flowering plant in the family Apocynaceae, native to Panama, Colombia, and Ecuador. It was first described by Robert Everard Woodson in 1932.

== Conservation ==
Mandevilla dodsonii was assessed as "endangered" in the 2003 IUCN Red List, where it is said to be native only to Ecuador. As of February 2023, M. dodsonii was regarded as a synonym of Mandevilla sagittarii, which has a wider distribution.
