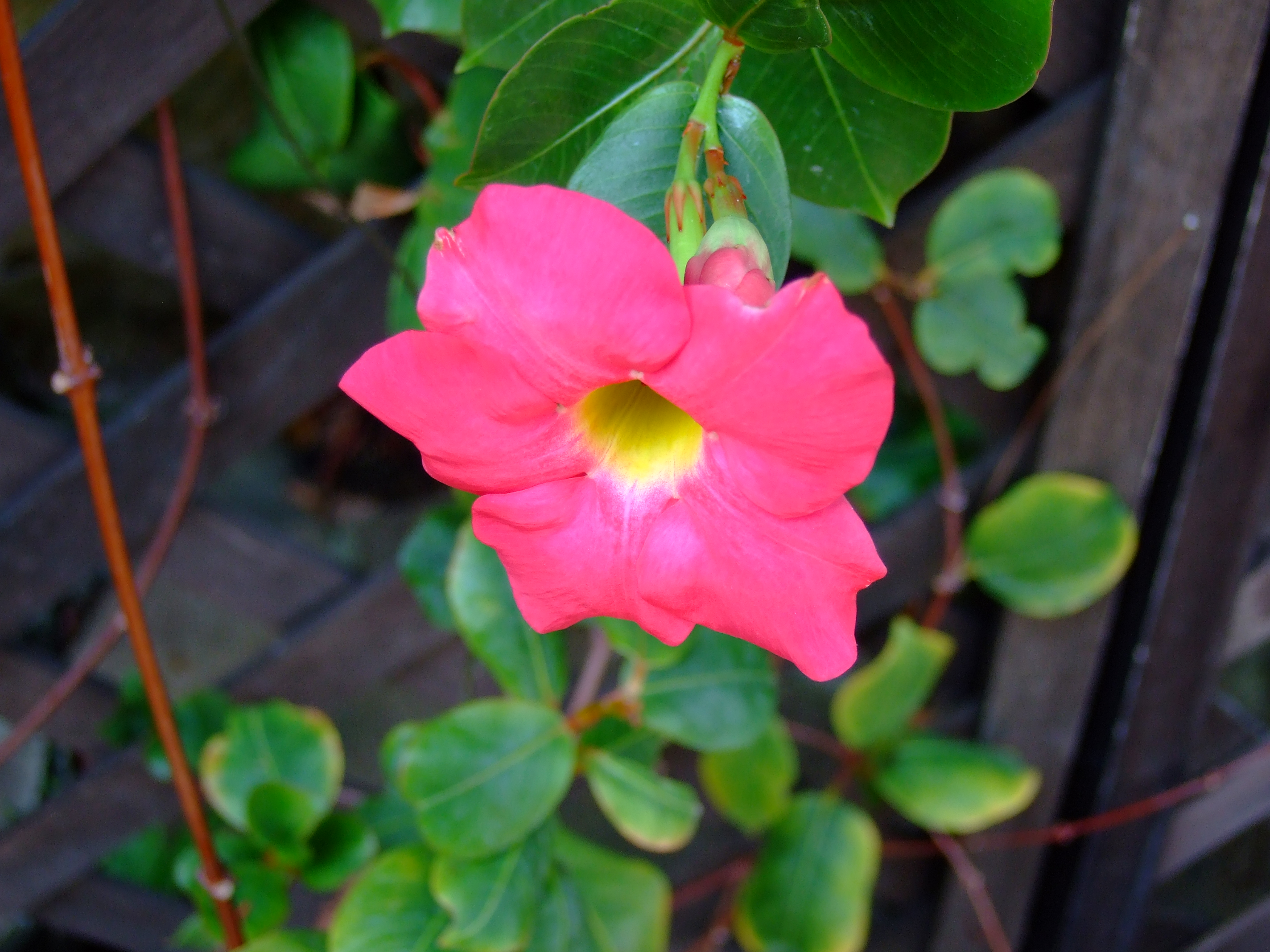

Scientific classification
- Kingdom: Plantae
- Clade: Tracheophytes
- Clade: Angiosperms
- Clade: Eudicots
- Clade: Asterids
- Order: Gentianales
- Family: Apocynaceae
- Genus: Mandevilla
- Species: M. sanderi

Binomial name
- Mandevilla sanderi (Hemsl.) Woodson

Synonyms
- Dipladenia sanderi Hemsl.

= Mandevilla sanderi =

Species of vine

Mandevilla sanderi, the Brazilian jasmine, is a vine belonging to the genus Mandevilla. Grown as an ornamental plant, the species is endemic to the State of Rio de Janeiro in Brazil. It is a rapidly growing, creeping, perennial plant, pruning shoots about 60 cm per year.

Despite its common name, the species is not a "true jasmine" and not of the genus Jasminum.

== Etymology ==
The genus name Mandevilla was awarded by John Lindley, a botanist, in memory of Henri Mandeville (1773-1861), one of his fellow British gardening enthusiasts who was a diplomat in Buenos Aires (Argentina). The sanderi species name refers to Henry Frederick Conrad Sander (1847-1920), a horticulturist and collector from Hertfordshire (in the UK) who brought the plant back from Brazil.

In 1896 WB Hemsley of Kew Gardens gave the first botanical description of the plant, which he named Dipladenia sanderi Hemsl. However, in 1933 Robert E. Woodson, who had undertaken a large taxonomic study of the Apocynaceae, made significant changes in the Mandevilla constituency. By including several genres such as Dipladenia inside Mandevilla, the plant ended up with the name Mandevilla sanderi.

== Description ==
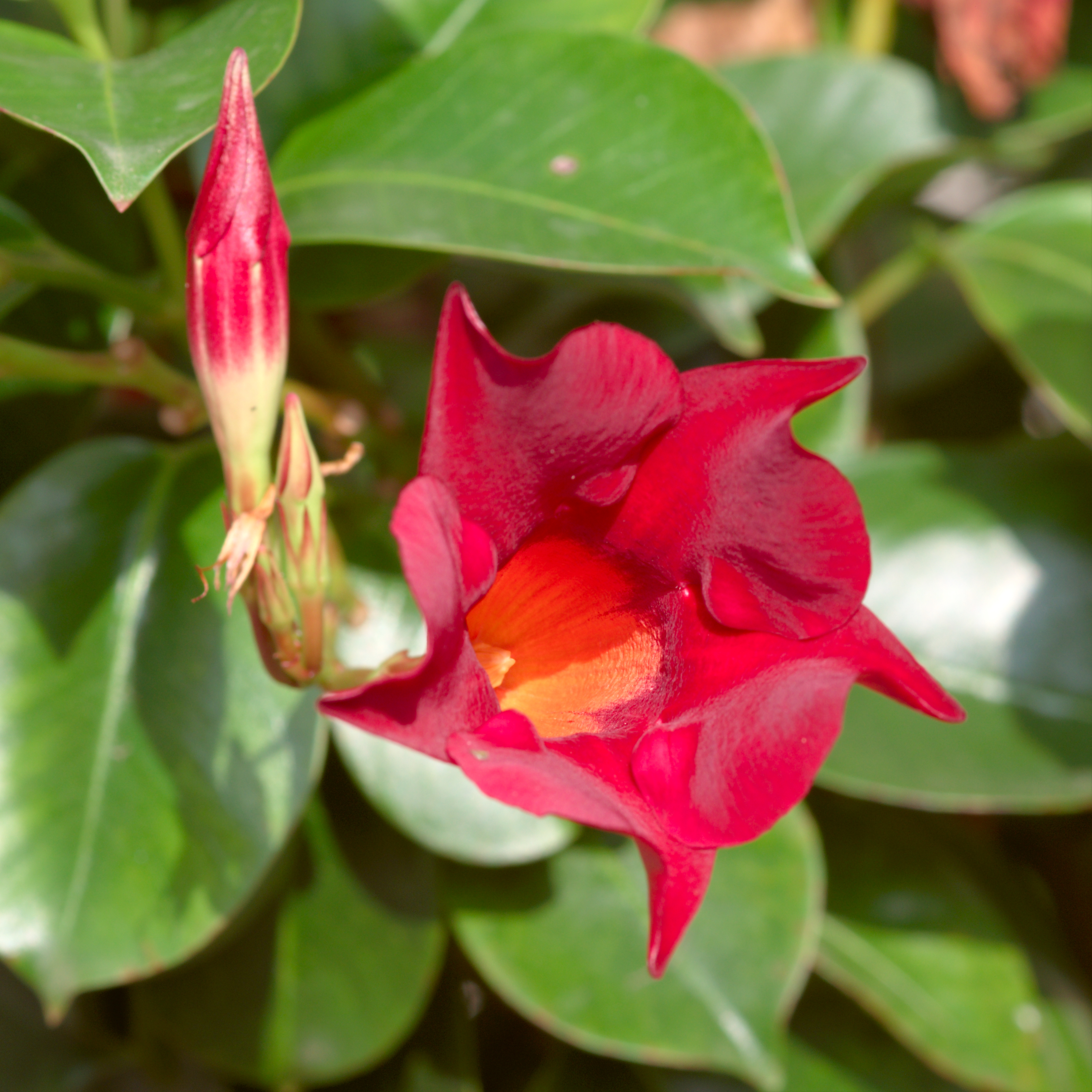
Emerging flower

Mandevilla sanderi is a shrub with a naturally bushy habit, 2–3 meters high, or 4.5 meters (15 feet) if the climate is warm. It is able to develop long, woody stems based on lignin and climbs by twining around some support. This twining growth is characterized by long internodes, small leaves and a stem rarely carrying flowers. The plant contains a white latex, which is viscous, toxic, and can be irritating. In addition to fine roots, it has large tuberous roots that contain starch and a reserve of water, allowing it to withstand drought. The evergreen, petiolate, thick, leathery, dark green leaves are opposite, and grow to 6 cm (2.5 in) long. The blade is ovate-elliptical, 5–6 cm long, with a glossy upper surface and a thick epidermis. The apex is shortly acuminate.

The inflorescences are simple racemes, usually terminal (sometimes axillary) that gather at a given moment, 3–4 pimples and a large blooming pink-red flower, 4–7 cm in diameter. Each flower has a chalice in cup with five teeth lanceolate-subulate scarious, a large corolla infundibular pink (funnel-shaped) formed of a cylindrical tube of 4–5 mm in diameter, which widens abruptly in a tube 15–18 × 25–30 mm, terminated by 5 oval lobes, acuminate, spreading, partially overlapping. The five stamens include threads inserted into the tube and connective anthers, forming a ring around the head. The long flowering period extends from spring to autumn. The flowers grow gradually from early summer to late winter, growing 2–3 on stalks in the leaf corners.

The fruit is dry, capsular, formed of two long follicles, and opens lengthwise like a silique.

== Cultivars ==
Many cultivars have been created:

- Sundaville® 'Moulin Rouge' with red scarlet velvety flowers, with a clear chalice and throat
- Sundaville® 'Dark Red' (2008), with dark red flowers
- Sundaville® 'Cream Pink' (2008), with pale pink flowers with a deep throat
- Tropidenia®, with pink flowers

Other cultivars: Mandevilla 'Red Riding Hood' with pale red flowers, 'My Fair Lady' with white flowers, yellow throats and pink buds, 'Alba' with white flowers, 'Rosea' with pale pink flowers and yellowish throat, etc.

== Usage ==
In temperate regions of Europe, it is usually grown in pots indoors, and possibly outdoors in the summer. Horticultural forms are generally sold under the name of Dipladenia.

Indoors, the plant must be installed in a bright area, protected from drafts. Outside, it is to be placed in a warm and bright place, in the sun, while ensuring that the midday sun does not spoil it. In the open ground, once well installed, it can withstand drought. If exposed to frost, however, it would die immediately.

The plant requires regular watering during the flowering period, allowing the soil to dry well between waterings. It prefers to be sprayed with non-calcareous water. Every two weeks, it is recommended to add fertilizer for flowering plants when watering in the summer. The most important condition for the success of the crop is to provide the plant with a constant and high humidity of the air.

== Gallery ==
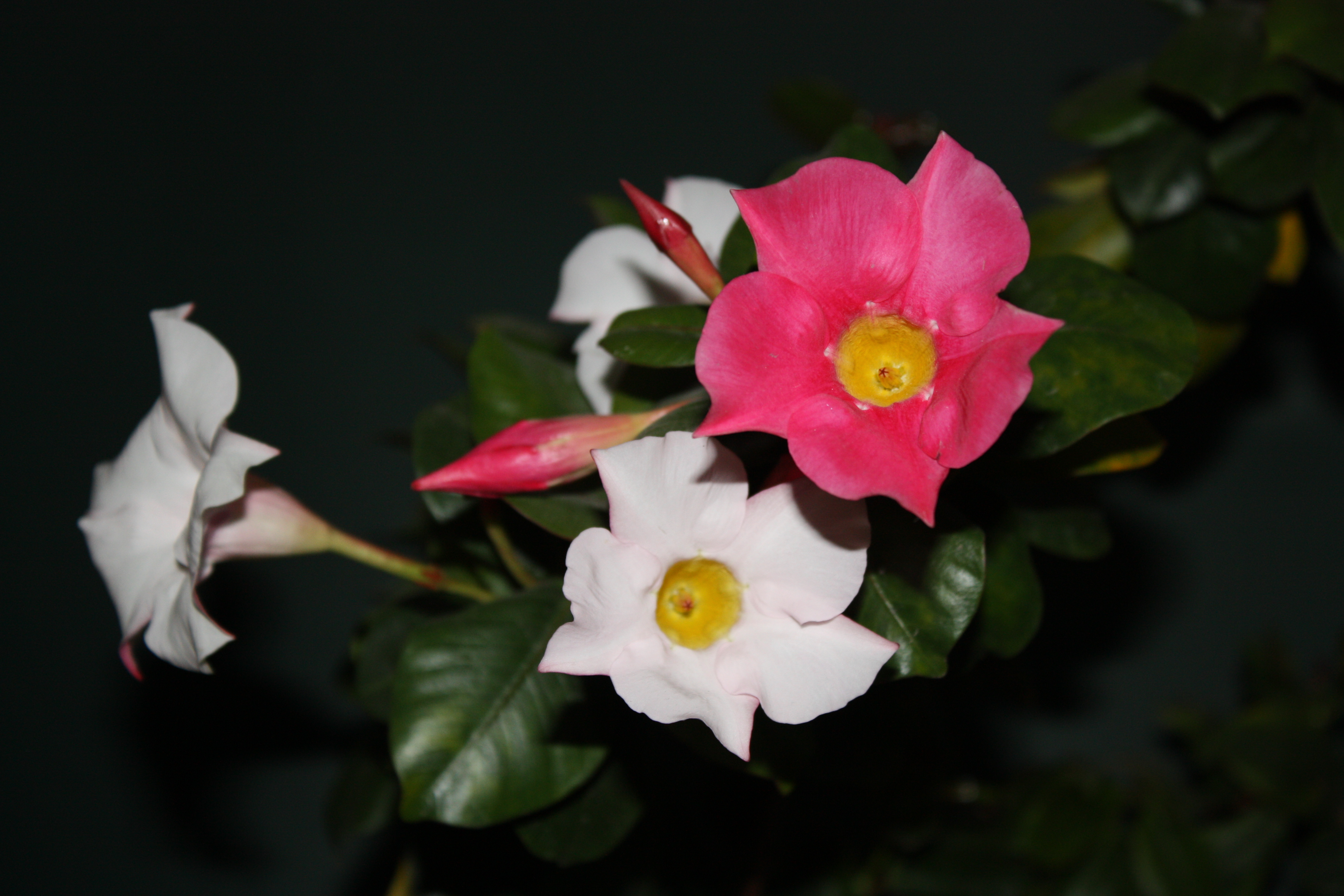

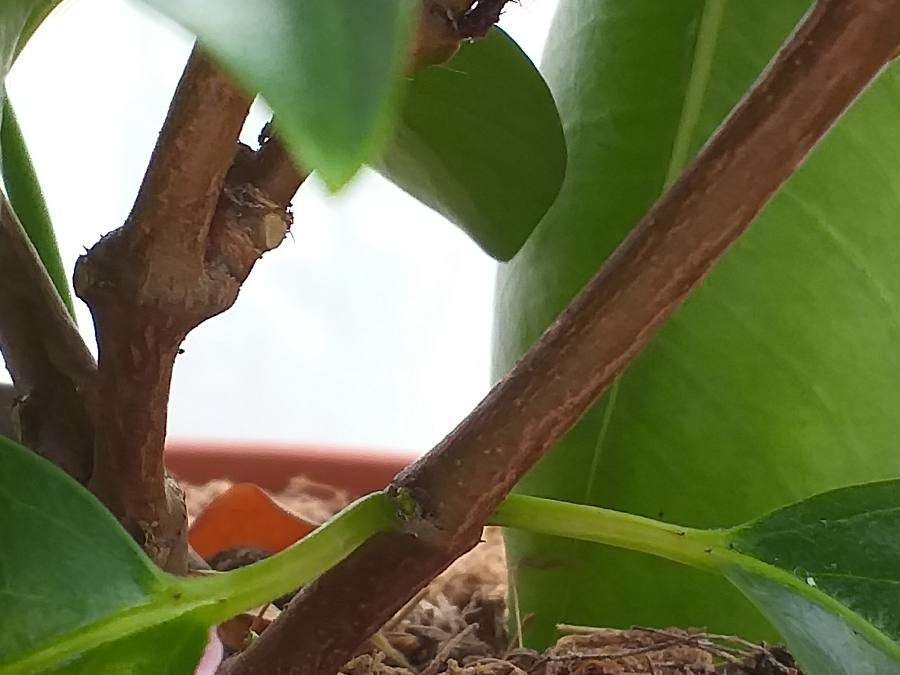
Stem

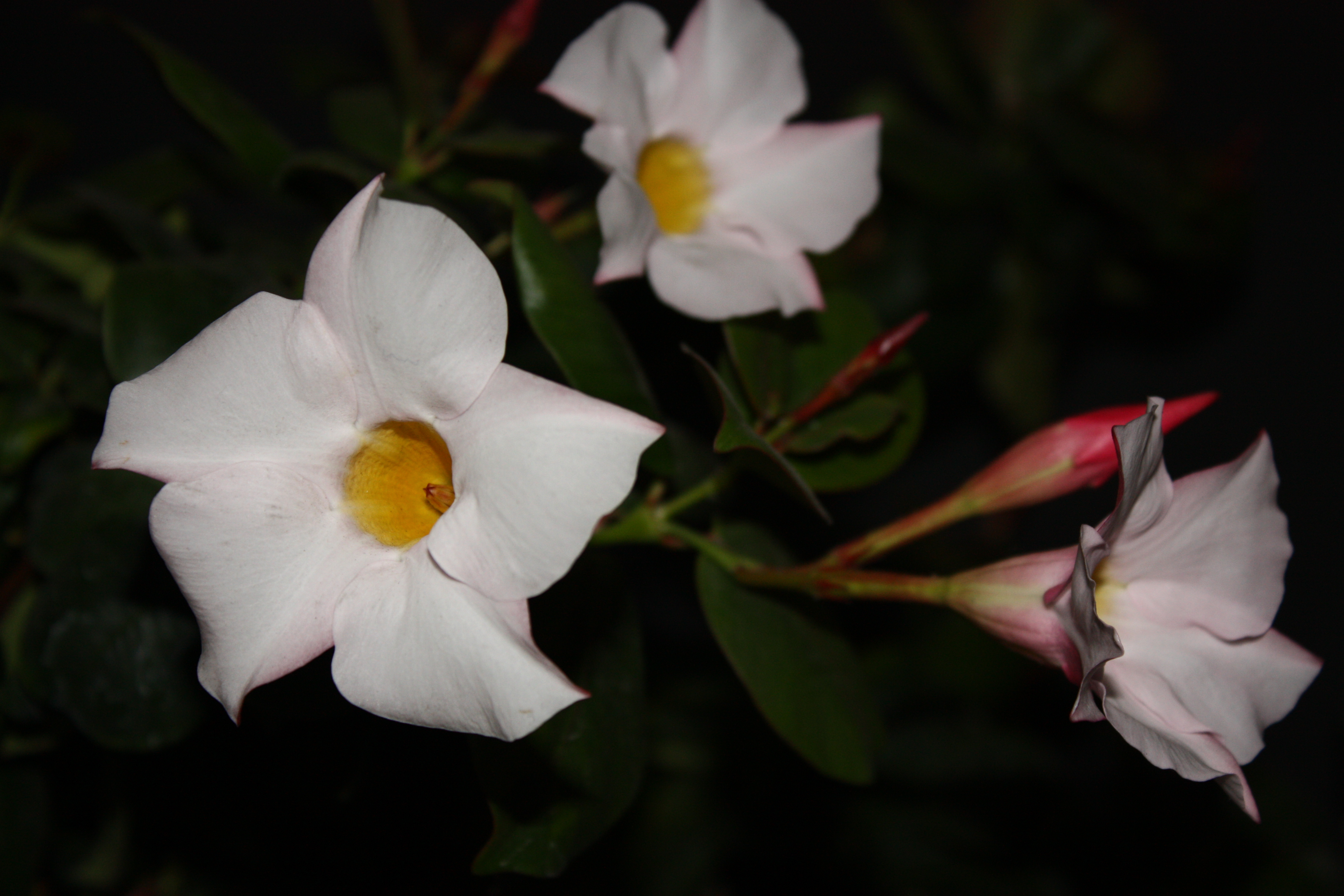

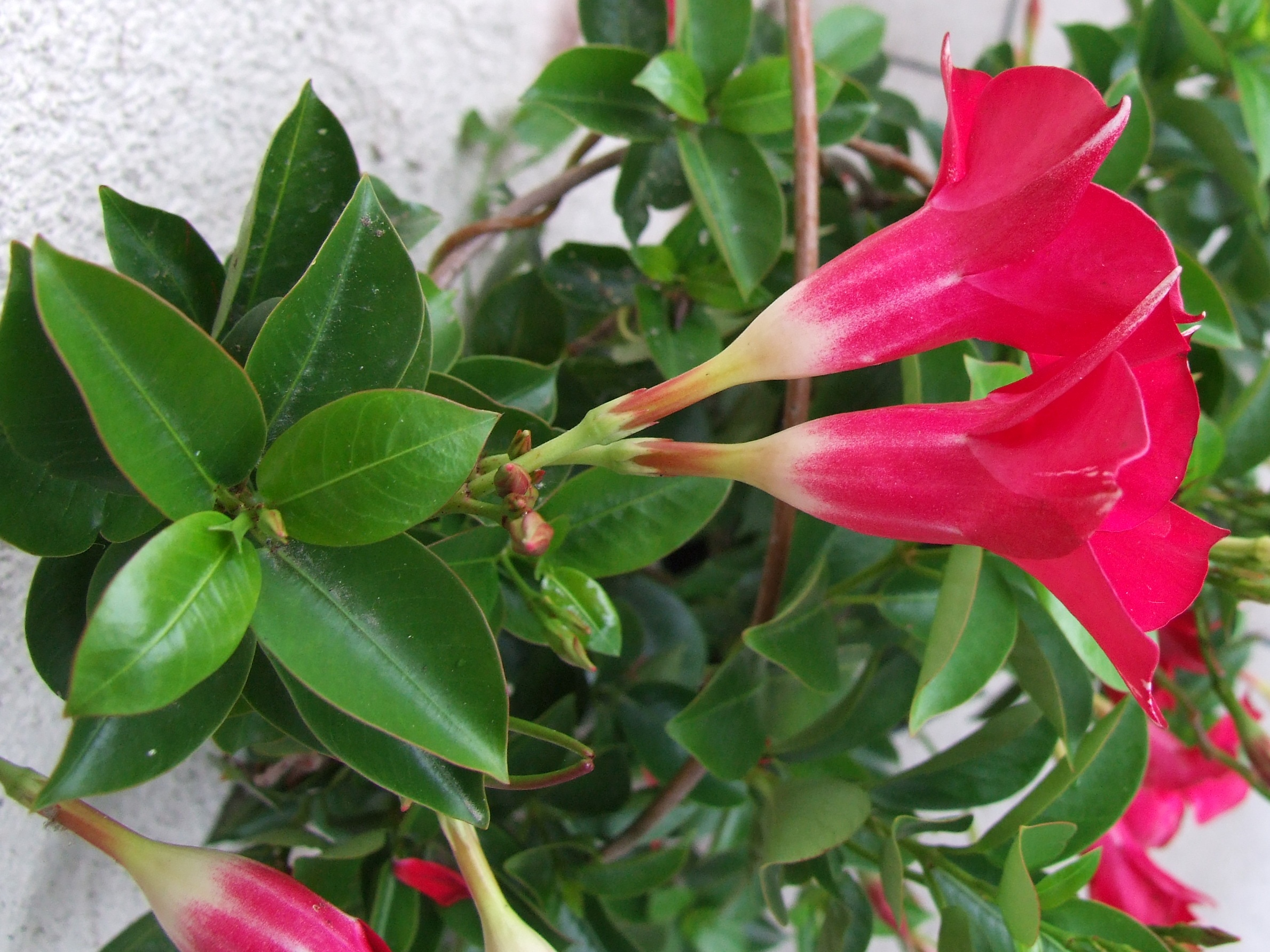

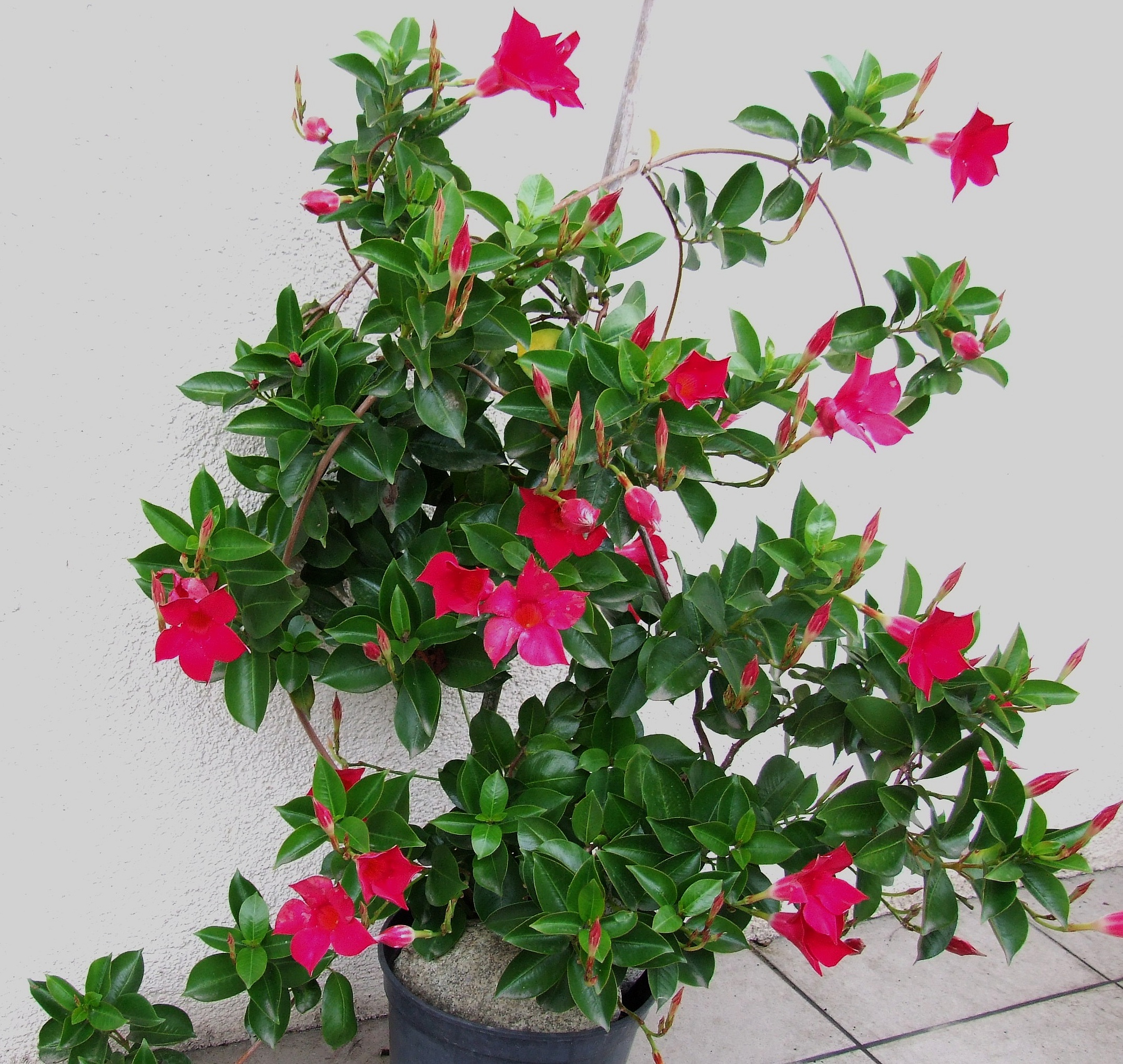

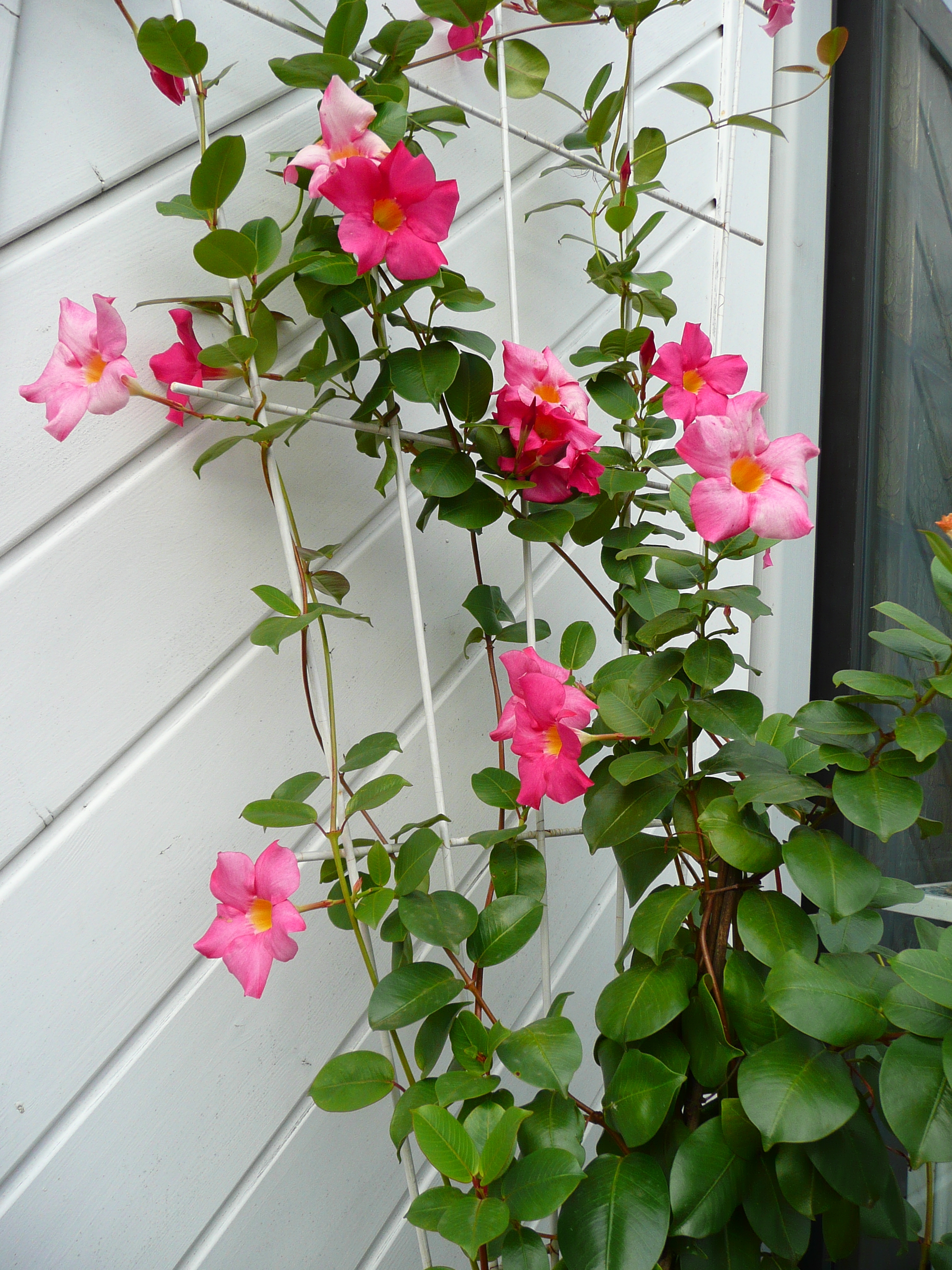

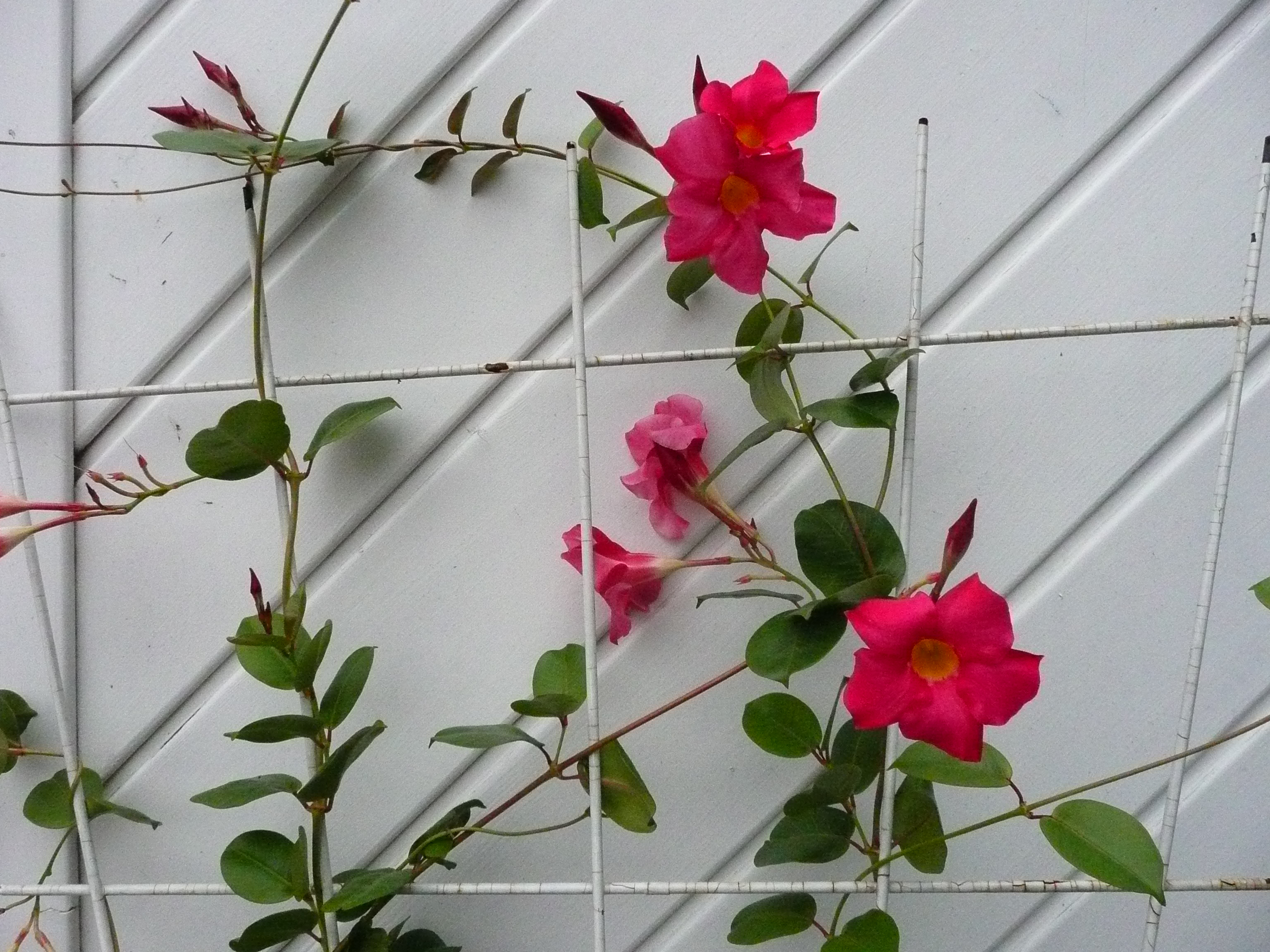

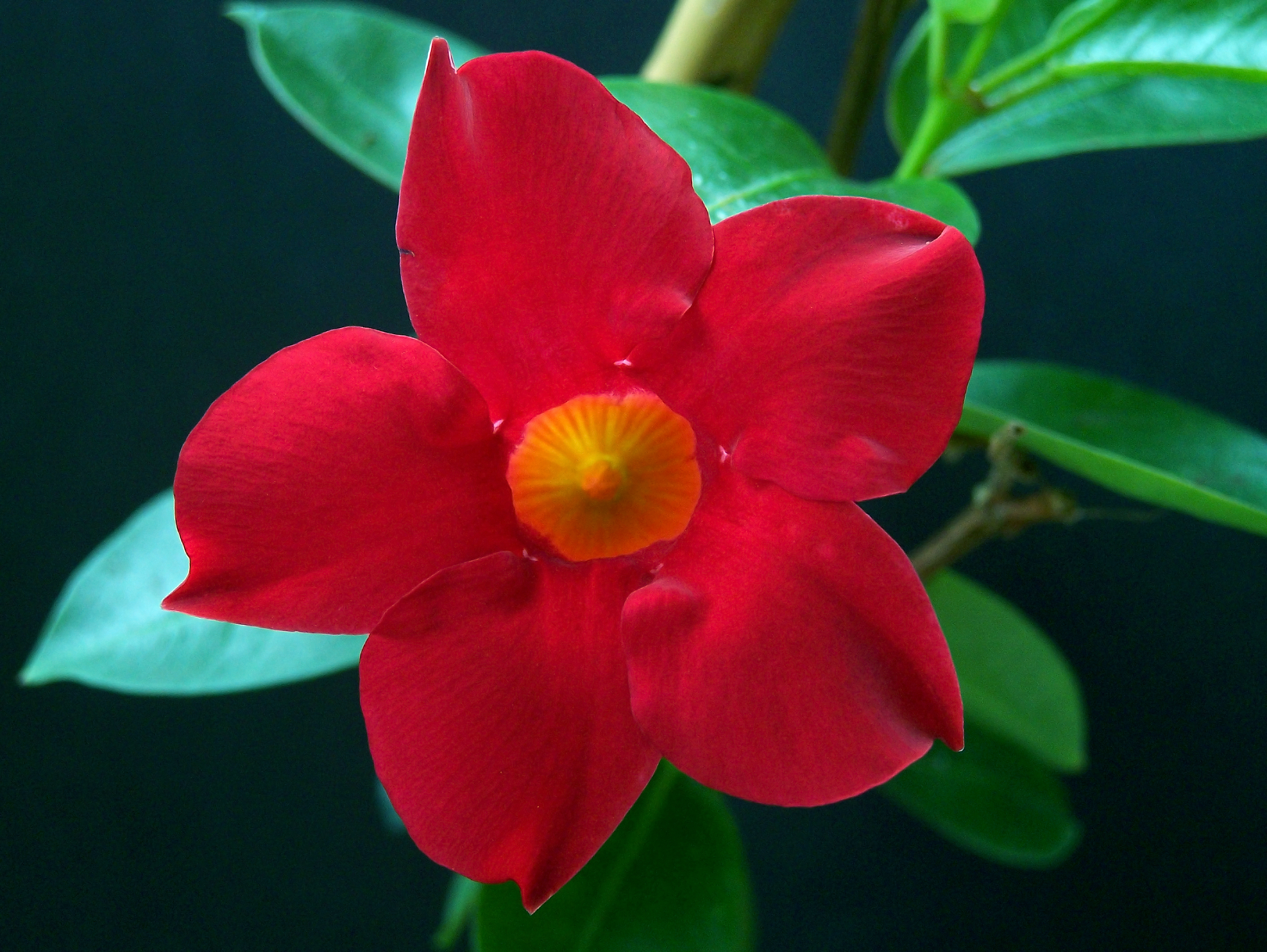
