= Allomarkgrafia ecuatoriana =

Conservation status
- Vulnerable (IUCN 3.1)

Scientific classification
- Kingdom: Plantae
- Clade: Tracheophytes
- Clade: Angiosperms
- Clade: Eudicots
- Clade: Asterids
- Order: Gentianales
- Family: Apocynaceae
- Genus: Allomarkgrafia
- Species: A. ecuatoriana

Binomial name
- Allomarkgrafia ecuatoriana J.F. Morales

Species of flowering plant

Allomarkgrafia ecuatoriana is a species of plant in the family Apocynaceae. It is endemic to Ecuador. Its natural habitat is subtropical or tropical moist lowland forests. It is threatened by habitat loss.
