= Mandevilla torosa =

- In Mexico

Scientific classification
- Kingdom: Plantae
- Clade: Tracheophytes
- Clade: Angiosperms
- Clade: Eudicots
- Clade: Asterids
- Order: Gentianales
- Family: Apocynaceae
- Genus: Mandevilla
- Species: M. torosa

Binomial name
- Mandevilla torosa (Jacq.) Woodson

Species of plant

Mandevilla torosa is a species of plant from Jamaica, which is extending its population towards southern Mexico. It has two varieties called "southern typical variety torosa" and "northern variety coulteri".
