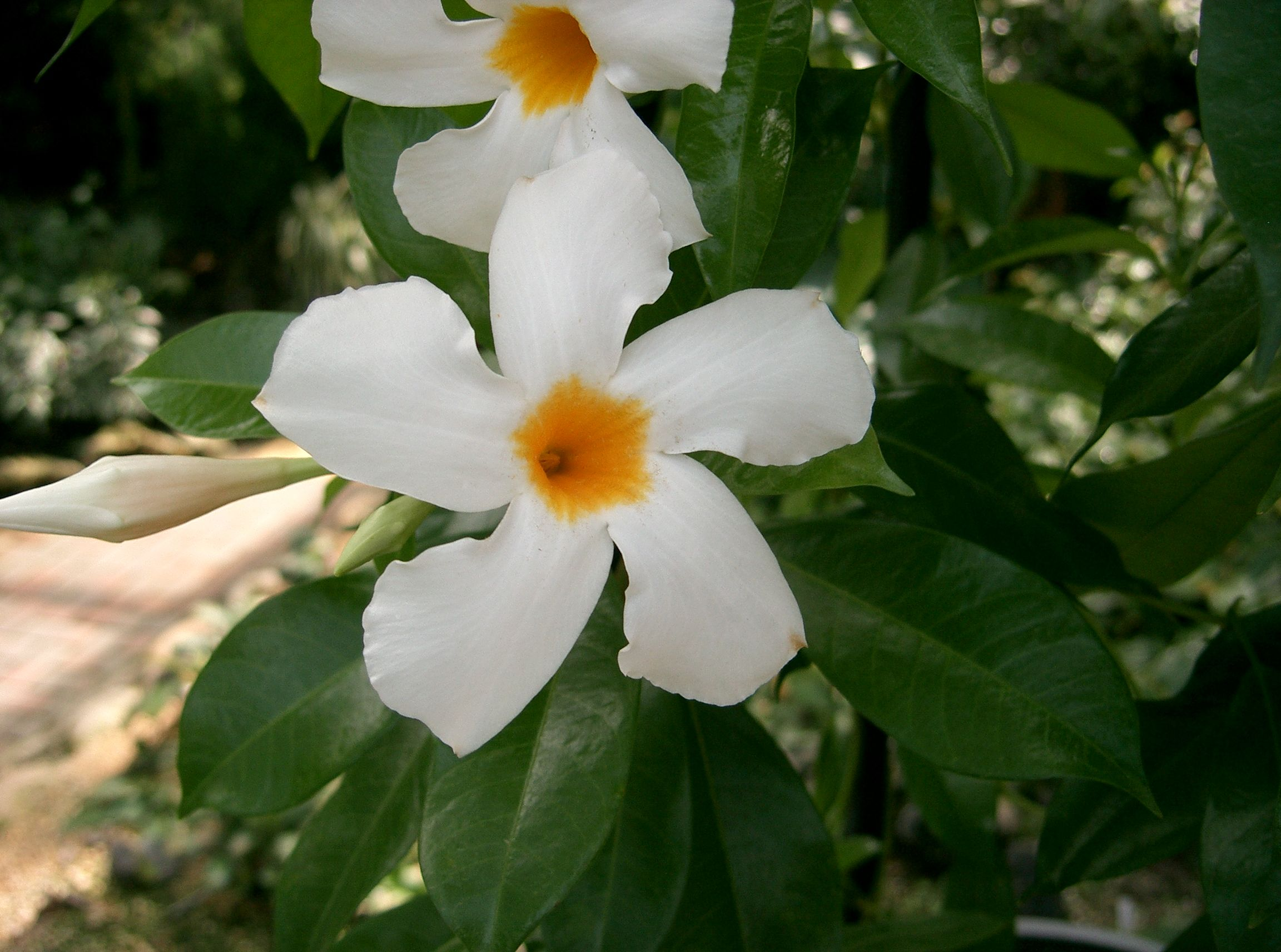

Scientific classification
- Kingdom: Plantae
- Clade: Tracheophytes
- Clade: Angiosperms
- Clade: Eudicots
- Clade: Asterids
- Order: Gentianales
- Family: Apocynaceae
- Genus: Mandevilla
- Species: M. boliviensis

Binomial name
- Mandevilla boliviensis (Hook.f.) Woodson

Synonyms
- Dipladenia bella Pittier; Dipladenia boliviensis Hook.f.; Mandevilla bella (Pittier) Woodson; Mandevilla pittieri Woodson

= Mandevilla boliviensis =

Species of plant

Mandevilla boliviensis is a species of flowering plant in the dogbane family Apocynaceae, native to a region ranging from Costa Rica south to Bolivia and Brazil. Common names include white mandevilla and white dipladenia.

A twining woody climber (vine) with glossy oval evergreen perennial leaves, in its natural surroundings Mandevilla boliviensis can grow to 4 m (13 ft) tall, and in more northern places it reaches a height of about 2 m (6.6 ft) and may become deciduous. It has big white flowers with a yellow center which grow in clusters. It flowers from spring until the autumn.

It does not tolerate freezing temperatures, though in summer it can be placed outside. It requires a sheltered spot in full sunlight. In cultivation in the United Kingdom, it has gained the Royal Horticultural Society's Award of Garden Merit. Hybrid ornamental cultivars have been developed, e.g. 'Cosmos White'.

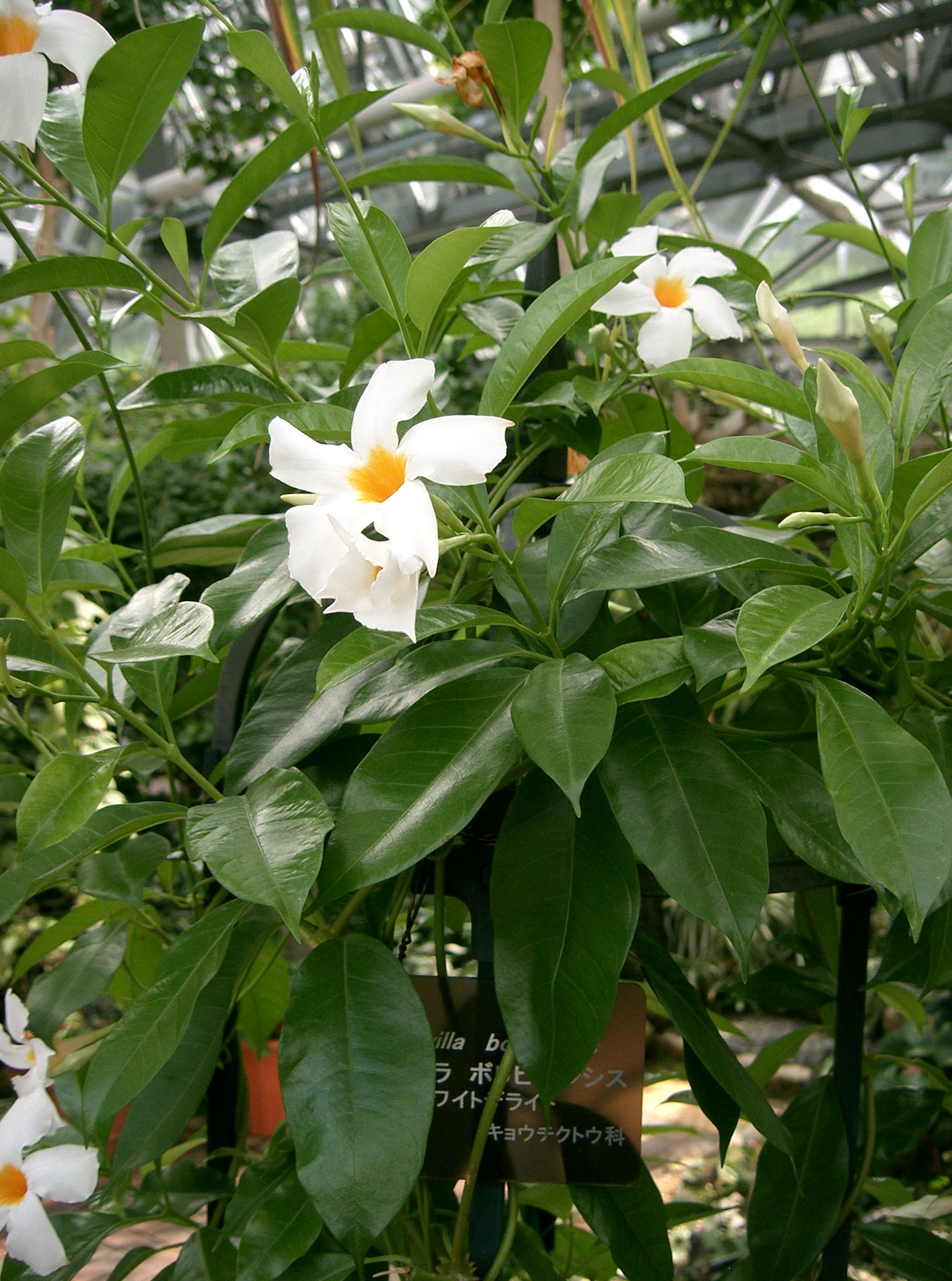
