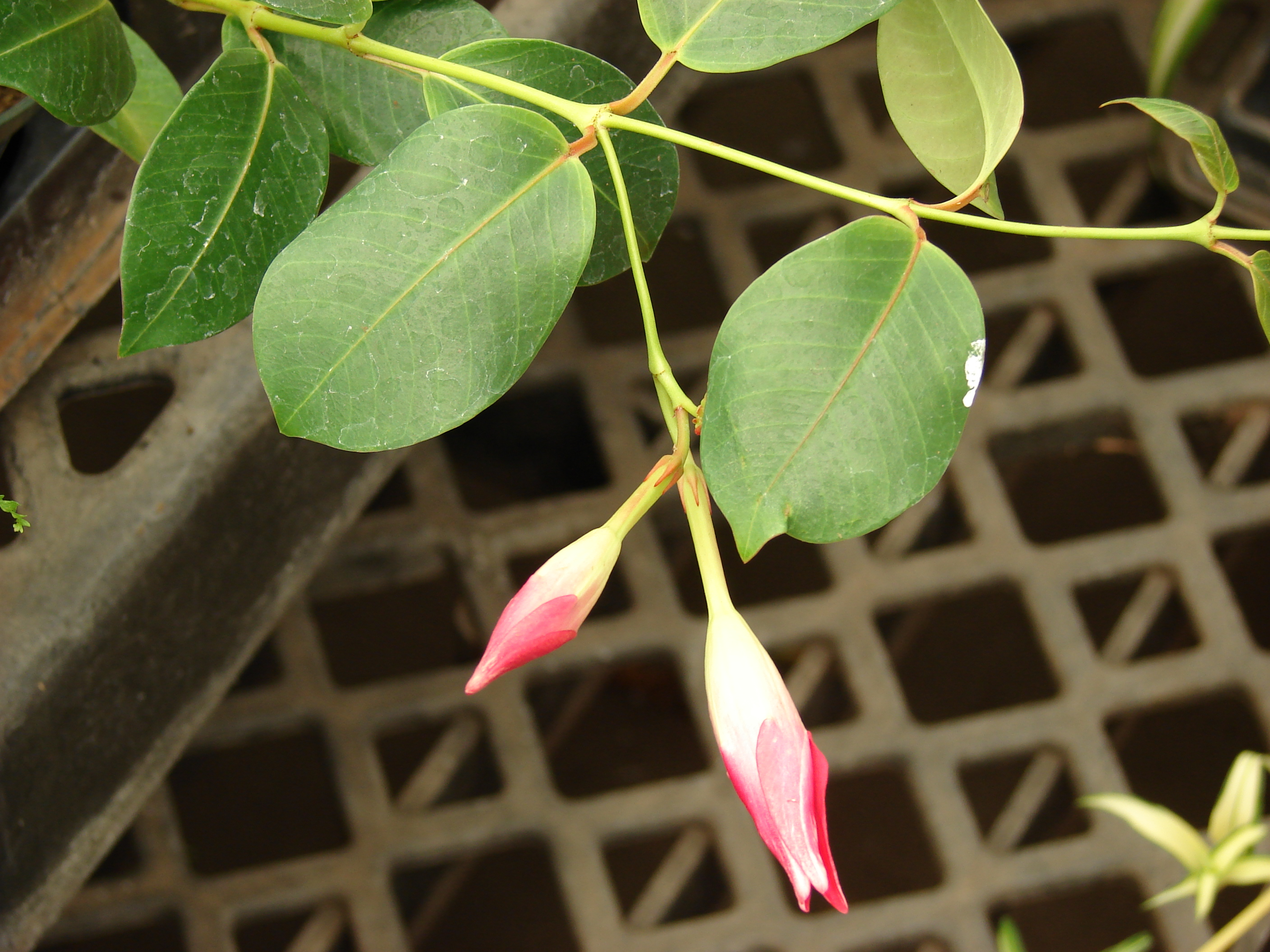

Scientific classification
- Kingdom: Plantae
- Clade: Tracheophytes
- Clade: Angiosperms
- Clade: Eudicots
- Clade: Asterids
- Order: Gentianales
- Family: Apocynaceae
- Genus: Mandevilla
- Species: M. splendens

Binomial name
- Mandevilla splendens (Hook.f.) Woodson

Synonyms
- Dipladenia splendens (Hook.f.) A.DC.; Echites splendens Hook.f.; Micradenia splendens (Hook.f.) Miers

= Mandevilla splendens =

Species of plant

Mandevilla splendens, the shining mandevilla, is a species of flowering plant in the family Apocynaceae. It is an evergreen vine, native to Brazil.

It climbs by twining and can grow to 3 m (9.8 ft) high. It has wide green glossy leaves of elliptical or rectangular shape growing to 20 cm (7.9 in) long. The flowers are rose-pink with yellow centers, appearing from late spring to early summer. They are up to 10 cm (3.9 in) in length. It prefers temperatures remaining over 5–10 °C (41–50 °F). In temperate zones it can be placed outside during the summer months, but must have protection in winter. It requires a sheltered spot in full sun. It has gained the Royal Horticultural Society's Award of Garden Merit.
