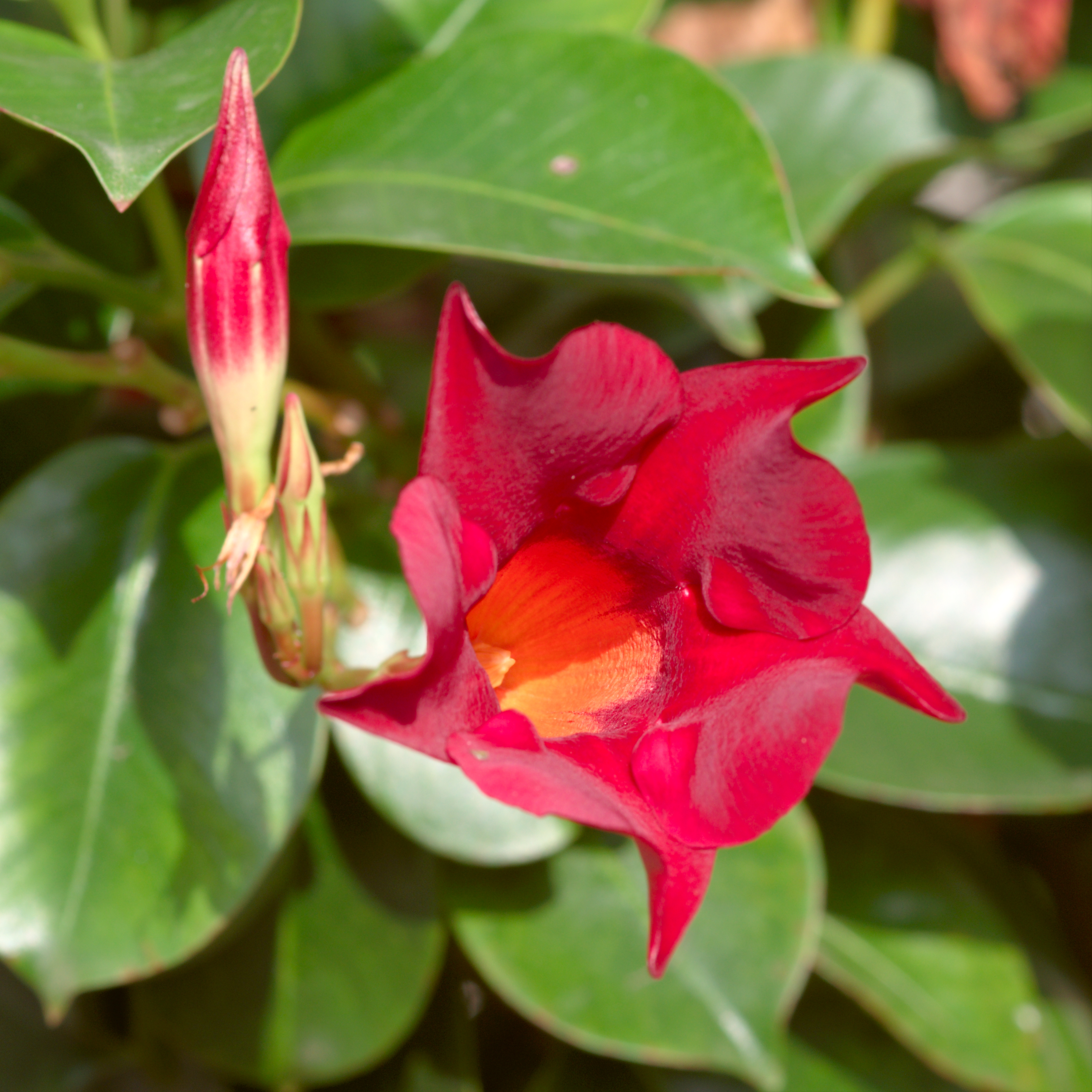
- Mandevilla sanderi

Scientific classification
- Kingdom: Plantae
- Clade: Tracheophytes
- Clade: Angiosperms
- Clade: Eudicots
- Clade: Asterids
- Order: Gentianales
- Family: Apocynaceae
- Subfamily: Apocynoideae
- Tribe: Mesechiteae
- Genus: Mandevilla; Lindl.

Synonyms
- Amblyanthera Müll.Arg. Dipladenia A.DC. Eriadenia Miers; Laseguea A.DC. Macrosiphonia Müll.Arg. Mitozus Miers; Salpinctes Woodson

= Mandevilla =

Genus of vines

Mandevilla /ˌmændɪˈvɪlə/ is a genus of tropical and subtropical flowering vines belonging to the family Apocynaceae. It was first described as a genus in 1840. A common name is rocktrumpet.

Mandevilla species are native to the Southwestern United States, Mexico, Central America, the West Indies, and South America. Many originate from the Serra dos Órgãos forests in Rio de Janeiro, Brazil. The genus was named after Henry Mandeville (1773-1861), a British diplomat and gardener.

== Cultivation and uses ==
Mandevillas develop spectacular, often fragrant flowers in warm climates. The flowers come in a variety of colours, including white, pink, yellow, and red. Many hybrids have been developed, mainly deriving from M. × amabilis, M. splendens, and M. sanderi. As climbers, mandevillas can be trained against a wall or trellis to provide a leafy green, and often flowering covering.

The hybrid cultivars Mandevilla × amabilis 'Alice du pont' and Sundaville Cream Pink='Sunparapibra' have won the Royal Horticultural Society's Award of Garden Merit.

== Species ==
Accepted species

- Mandevilla abortiva - Bahia, Goiás
- Mandevilla acutiloba - Mexico to Honduras
- Mandevilla aequatorialis - Ecuador
- Mandevilla albifolia - Venezuela
- Mandevilla alboviridis - Peru, Colombia
- Mandevilla amazonica - S Venezuela
- Mandevilla anceps - S Venezuela, NW Brazil
- Mandevilla andina - Bolivia
- Mandevilla angustata - S Venezuela, Guyana
- Mandevilla angustifolia - Bolivia, Paraguay, N Argentina
- Mandevilla annulariifolia - S Venezuela, NW Brazil, SE Colombia
- Mandevilla antioquiana - Antioquia in Colombia
- Mandevilla apocynifolia - Jalisco, Nayarit, Michoacán
- Mandevilla aracamunensis - S Venezuela
- Mandevilla arcuata - Peru, S Colombia
- Mandevilla aridana - Santander in Colombia
- Mandevilla assimilis - Ecuador
- Mandevilla atroviolacea - S Brazil
- Mandevilla bahiensis - Bahia
- Mandevilla barretoi - Minas Gerais
- Mandevilla benthamii - SE Venezuela, Guyana
- Mandevilla bogotensis - NW Venezuela, Ecuador, Colombia
- Mandevilla boliviensis - Costa Rica to Bolivia + E Brazil
- Mandevilla brachyloba - Bolivia, Peru, NW Argentina
- Mandevilla brachysiphon - Arizona, New Mexico, N Mexico
- Mandevilla bracteata - Ecuador, Colombia
- Mandevilla bradei - Goiás
- Mandevilla callacatensis - Peru
- Mandevilla callista - Colombia, Peru, Ecuador, Bolivia
- Mandevilla caquetana - Caquetá in Colombia
- Mandevilla catimbauensis - Pernambuco
- Mandevilla caurensis - SE Colombia, S Venezuela
- Mandevilla cercophylla - Ecuador, SW Colombia, Peru
- Mandevilla clandestina - Brazil
- Mandevilla coccinea - Brazil, Uruguay, Paraguay, NE Argentina
- Mandevilla columbiana - S Colombia
- Mandevilla convolvulacea - Puebla, Oaxaca
- Mandevilla crassinoda - Rio de Janeiro
- Mandevilla cuneifolia - SE Colombia, NW Brazil
- Mandevilla cuspidata - Peru, Bolivia
- Mandevilla dardanoi - Pernambuco
- Mandevilla dissimilis - Ecuador
- Mandevilla duidae - Amazonas in Venezuela
- Mandevilla emarginata - Brazil, Uruguay, Paraguay, NE Argentina, Bolivia
- Mandevilla duartei - Minas Gerais
- Mandevilla equatorialis - Ecuador
- Mandevilla espinosae - Ecuador
- Mandevilla exilicaulis - Michoacán, Colima, Jalisco
- Mandevilla eximia - S Brazil
- Mandevilla filifolia - S Venezuela
- Mandevilla fistulosa - SE Bahia, Espírito Santo
- Mandevilla foliosa - Chihuahua to Oaxaca
- Mandevilla fragilis - Bolivia
- Mandevilla fragrans - S Brazil
- Mandevilla frigida - Piura in Peru
- Mandevilla funiformis - S + SE Brazil
- Mandevilla glandulosa - Peru
- Mandevilla gracilis - S Colombia, NW Brazil, Venezuela, Guyana
- Mandevilla grata - Tucumán in Argentina
- Mandevilla grazielae - E Brazil
- Mandevilla guanabarica - Espírito Santo, Rio de Janeiro
- Mandevilla harleyi - Minas Gerais
- Mandevilla hatschbachii - Bahia
- Mandevilla hesperia - Baja California Sur
- Mandevilla hirsuta - S Mexico to Paraguay
- Mandevilla holosericea - México State to Oaxaca
- Mandevilla holstii - Amazonas in Venezuela
- Mandevilla horrida - Cajamarca
- Mandevilla huberi - Amazonas in Venezuela
- Mandevilla hypoleuca - Mexico, Texas
- Mandevilla illustris - Paraguay, Brazil
- Mandevilla immaculata - S Brazil
- Mandevilla inexperata - Ecuador
- Mandevilla jamesonii - Ecuador
- Mandevilla jasminiflora - Colombia
- Mandevilla javitensis - SE Colombia, NW Brazil, Venezuela, Guyana
- Mandevilla kalmiifolia - Cerro Duida in Venezuela
- Mandevilla krukovii - NW Brazil
- Mandevilla lancibracteata - Colombia, Ecuador, Venezuela
- Mandevilla lancifolia - SE Colombia, S Venezuela
- Mandevilla lanuginosa - S Texas, Mexico
- Mandevilla laxa - Bolivia, Peru, N Argentina
- Mandevilla leptophylla - Bahia, Minas Gerais
- Mandevilla ligustriflora - Ecuador
- Mandevilla lobbii - Peru
- Mandevilla lojana - Ecuador
- Mandevilla longiflora - Bolivia, Paraguay, Uruguay, N Argentina, Brazil
- Mandevilla longipes - Colombia
- Mandevilla lucida - Rio de Janeiro
- Mandevilla luetzelburgii - Espírito Santo
- Mandevilla macrosiphon NE Mexico, S Texas
- Mandevilla martiana - E Brazil
- Mandevilla martii - C Brazil
- Mandevilla matogrossana - Bolívar in Venezuela, Mato Grosso
- Mandevilla megabracteata - NE Colombia, Guyana
- Mandevilla mexicana - Oaxaca
- Mandevilla microphylla - Bahia
- Mandevilla mollissima - Colombia
- Mandevilla montana - SW Colombia, Ecuador, Peru
- Mandevilla moricandiana - E Brazil
- Mandevilla moritziana - NE Colombia, Venezuela
- Mandevilla muelleri - SE Brazil
- Mandevilla myriophylla - C Brazil
- Mandevilla nacapulensis - Sonora
- Mandevilla nacarema - Colombia
- Mandevilla nerioides - Colombia, S Venezuela
- Mandevilla nevadana - Magdalena in Colombia
- Mandevilla novocapitalis - C Brazil
- Mandevilla oaxacana - Oaxaca
- Mandevilla obtusifolia - Amazonas in Venezuela
- Mandevilla pachyphylla - Bolívar in Venezuela
- Mandevilla paisae - Antioquia
- Mandevilla pavonii - Colombia to Bolivia
- Mandevilla pendula - SE Brazil
- Mandevilla pentlandiana - Peru, Bolivia, Brazil, N Argentina
- Mandevilla petraea - Paraguay, Uruguay, Bolivia, Brazil, N Argentina
- Mandevilla pohliana - Paraguay, Bolivia, Brazil, N Argentina
- Mandevilla polyantha - Peru
- Mandevilla pristina - Peru
- Mandevilla pubescens - NW Venezuela, Colombia, Ecuador
- Mandevilla puyumato - Colombia
- Mandevilla pycnantha - Minas Gerais
- Mandevilla riparia - Peru, Colombia, Ecuador
- Mandevilla rubra - Minas Gerais
- Mandevilla rugellosa - N + C South America
- Mandevilla rugosa - Guyana, Brazil
- Mandevilla rutila - Peru, Bolivia
- Mandevilla sagittarii - Panama, Colombia, Ecuador
- Mandevilla sancta - Bahia
- Mandevilla sancta-martae - Magdalena in Colombia
- Mandevilla sandemanii - Peru
- Mandevilla sanderi - Rio de Janeiro
- Mandevilla sandwithii - Guyana
- Mandevilla scaberula - N Brazil, Venezuela, Guyana, Fr Guiana
- Mandevilla scabra - tropical South America
- Mandevilla schlimii - Venezuela, Colombia
- Mandevilla scutifolia - Peru
- Mandevilla sellowii - S Brazil
- Mandevilla semirii - Minas Gerais
- Mandevilla similaris - SE Venezuela
- Mandevilla speciosa - N Brazil, Venezuela, Guyana, Colombia
- Mandevilla spigeliiflora - Brazil, Paraguay, Bolivia
- Mandevilla splendens - Rio de Janeiro
- Mandevilla steyermarkii - S Venezuela, SE Colombia
- Mandevilla subcarnosa - N Brazil, Venezuela, Guyana, Colombia
- Mandevilla subcordata - Bolivia
- Mandevilla subsagittata - Mexico to Peru; Cuba, Trinidad
- Mandevilla subscorpoidea - Guatemala, S Mexico
- Mandevilla subsessilis - C Mexico to El Salvador
- Mandevilla subumbelliflora - Peru
- Mandevilla surinamensis - Venezuela, 3 Guianas
- Mandevilla symphytocarpa - Trinidad to Bolivia
- Mandevilla tenuifolia - Suriname, Brazil
- Mandevilla thevetioides - SE Colombia
- Mandevilla torosa - Tamaulipas to Honduras; Cuba, Jamaica
- Mandevilla trianae - Guyana to Peru
- Mandevilla tricolor - Ecuador
- Mandevilla tristis - Táchira
- Mandevilla tubiflora - NW Mexico to Nicaragua
- Mandevilla turgida - S Venezuela
- Mandevilla ulei - NW Brazil
- Mandevilla undulata - Paraguay, Misiones
- Mandevilla urceolata - Rio de Janeiro
- Mandevilla urophylla - SE Brazil
- Mandevilla vanheurckii - Venezuela, Peru, NW Brazil
- Mandevilla vasquezii - Peru
- Mandevilla velame - Brazil
- Mandevilla venulosa - Minas Gerais, São Paulo
- Mandevilla veraguasensis - S Central America, NW South America
- Mandevilla versicolor - Peru, Ecuador
- Mandevilla villosa - Chiapas to S Venezuela
- Mandevilla virescens - S Brazil, Paraguay, NE Argentina
- Mandevilla widgrenii - Brazil, Paraguay
- Mandevilla xerophytica - Boyaca in Colombia

== Gallery ==
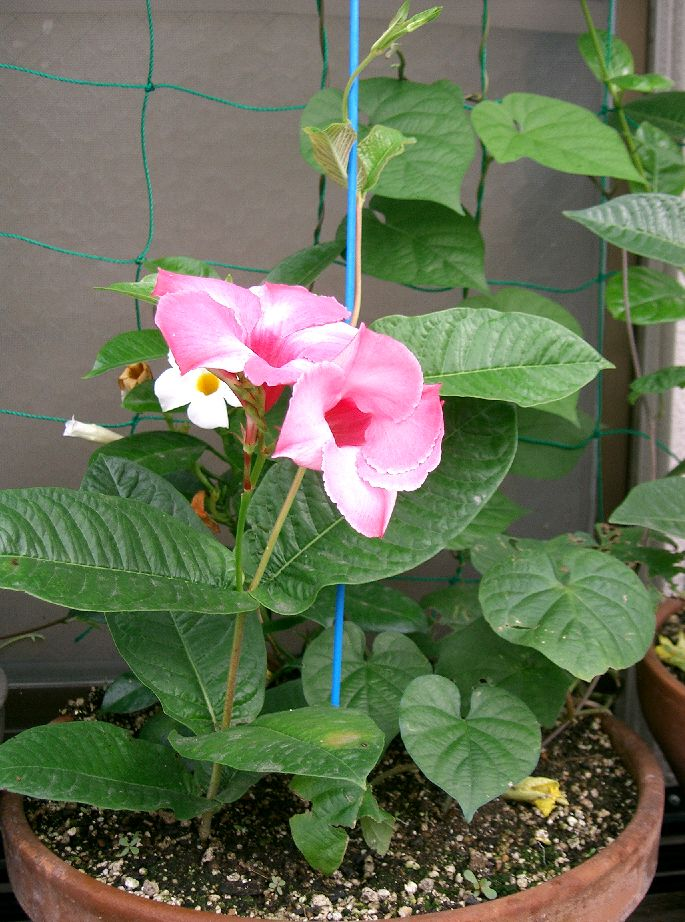
Cultivar "Best Red"

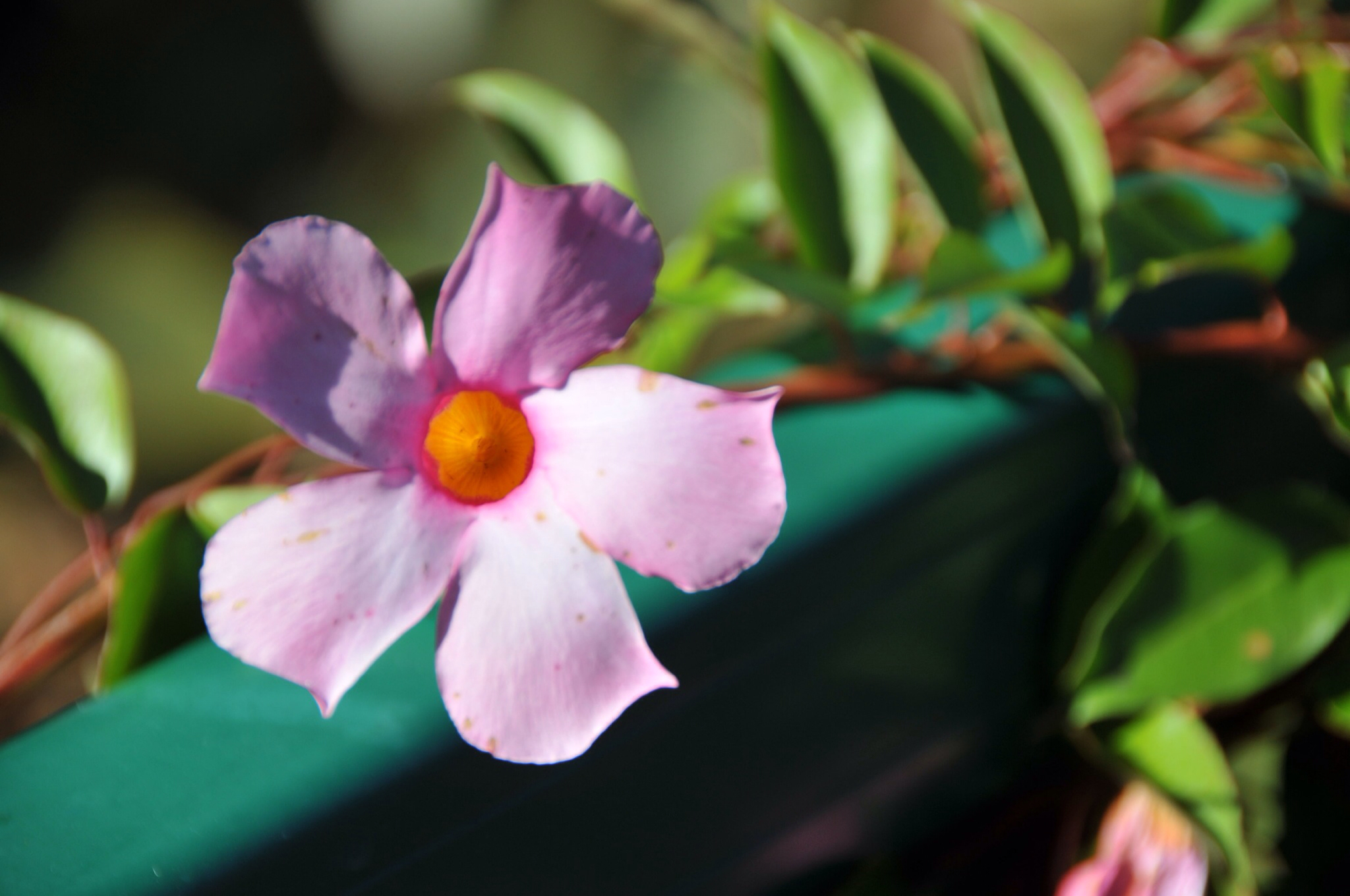
Pink mandevilla grown in Southern Ontario, Canada

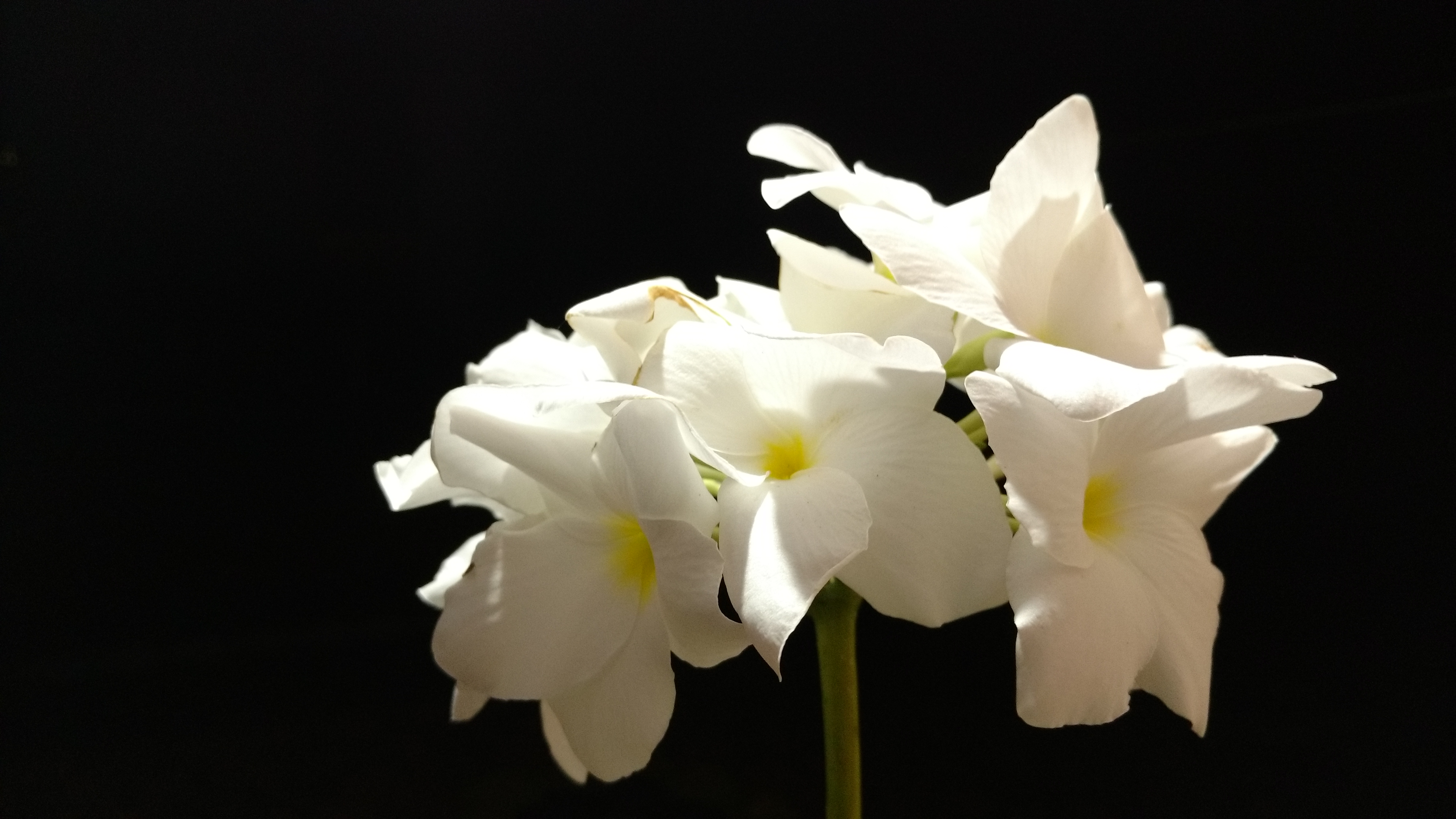
White dipladenia at night in Wayanad, India
