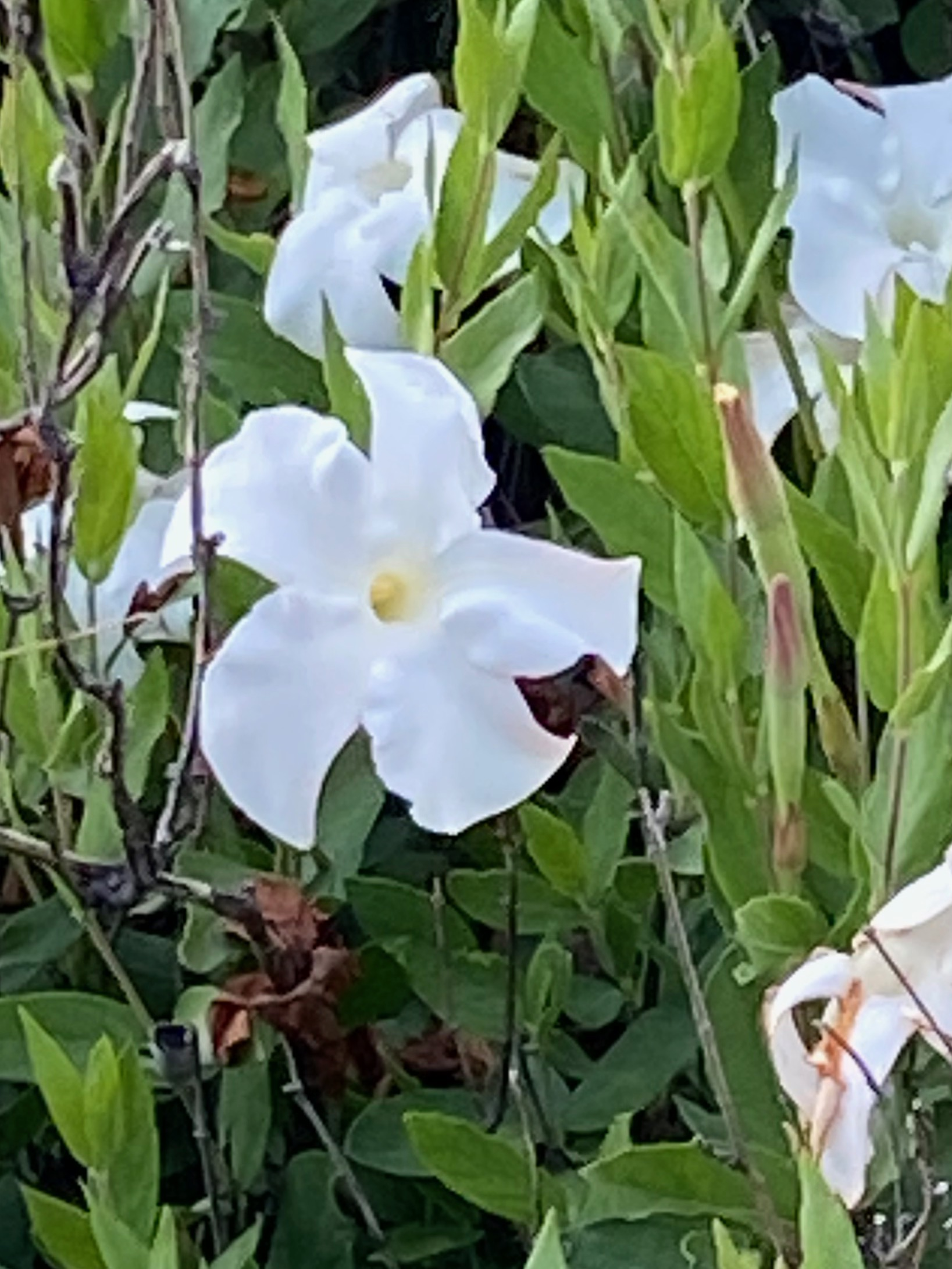
- Mandevilla brachysiphon close up in the Atascosa Highlands, southern Arizona

Scientific classification
- Kingdom: Plantae
- Clade: Tracheophytes
- Clade: Angiosperms
- Clade: Eudicots
- Clade: Asterids
- Order: Gentianales
- Family: Apocynaceae
- Genus: Mandevilla
- Species: M. brachysiphon

Binomial name
- Mandevilla brachysiphon (Torr.) Pichon

Synonyms
- Echites brachysiphon Torr.; Macrosiphonia brachysiphon (Torr.) A. Gray; Macrosiphonia dulcis A.Nelson; Macrosiphonia woodsoniana Standl.; Telosiphonia brachysiphon (Torr.) Henriks.

= Mandevilla brachysiphon =

Species of vine

Mandevilla brachysiphon is a plant species with the common name Huachuca Mountain rocktrumpet. It is native to southern Arizona, southwestern New Mexico, Texas, Chihuahua and Sonora. It grows on rocky slopes and plains ion desert and grassland, often on limestone soil.

This is a low plant rarely attaining a height of over 40 cm. It has white, showy flowers that open at night and are very fragrant. The seeds are minutely puberulent.

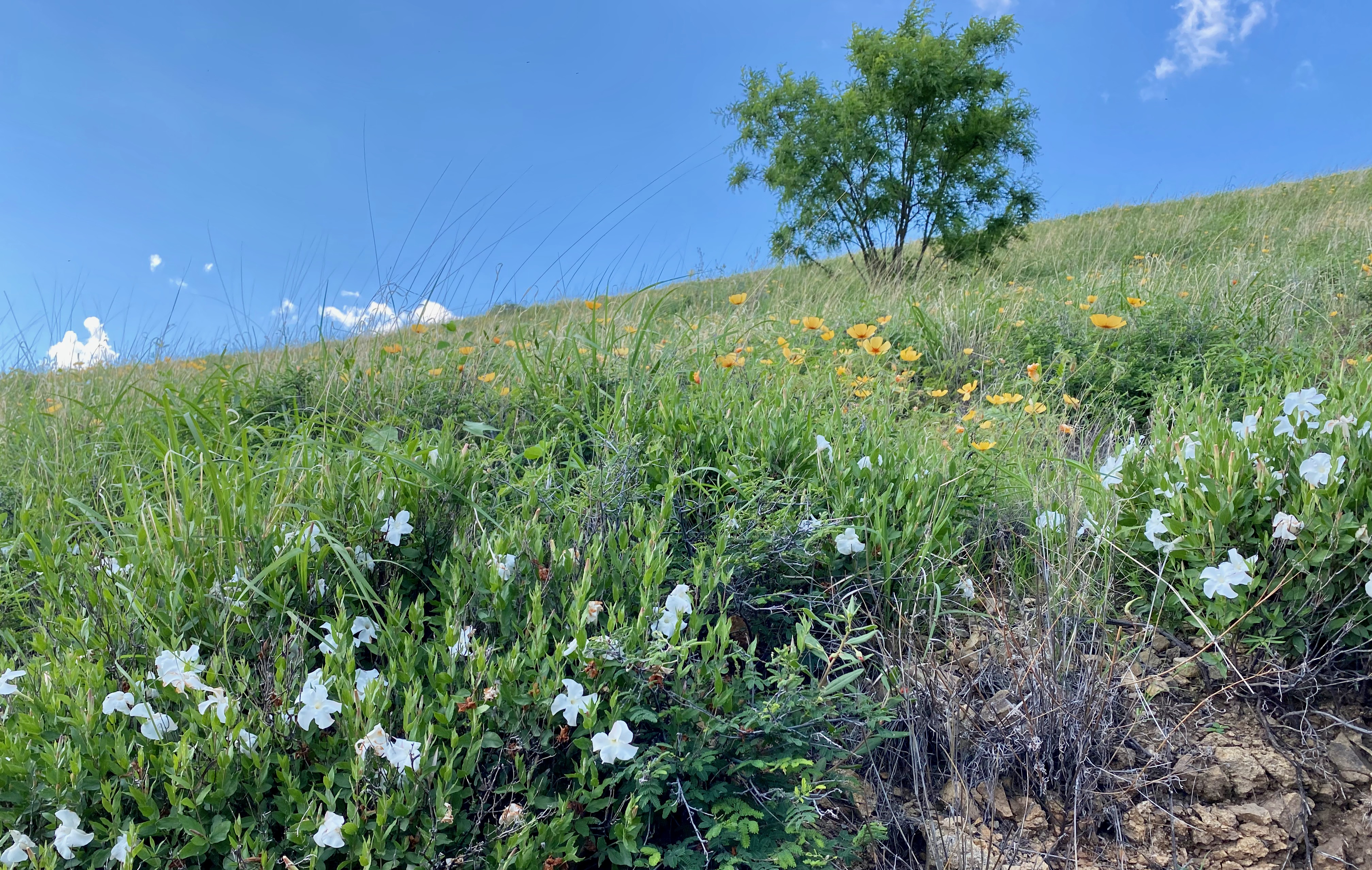
Mandevilla brachysiphon habitat in the Atascosa Highlands, southern Arizona
