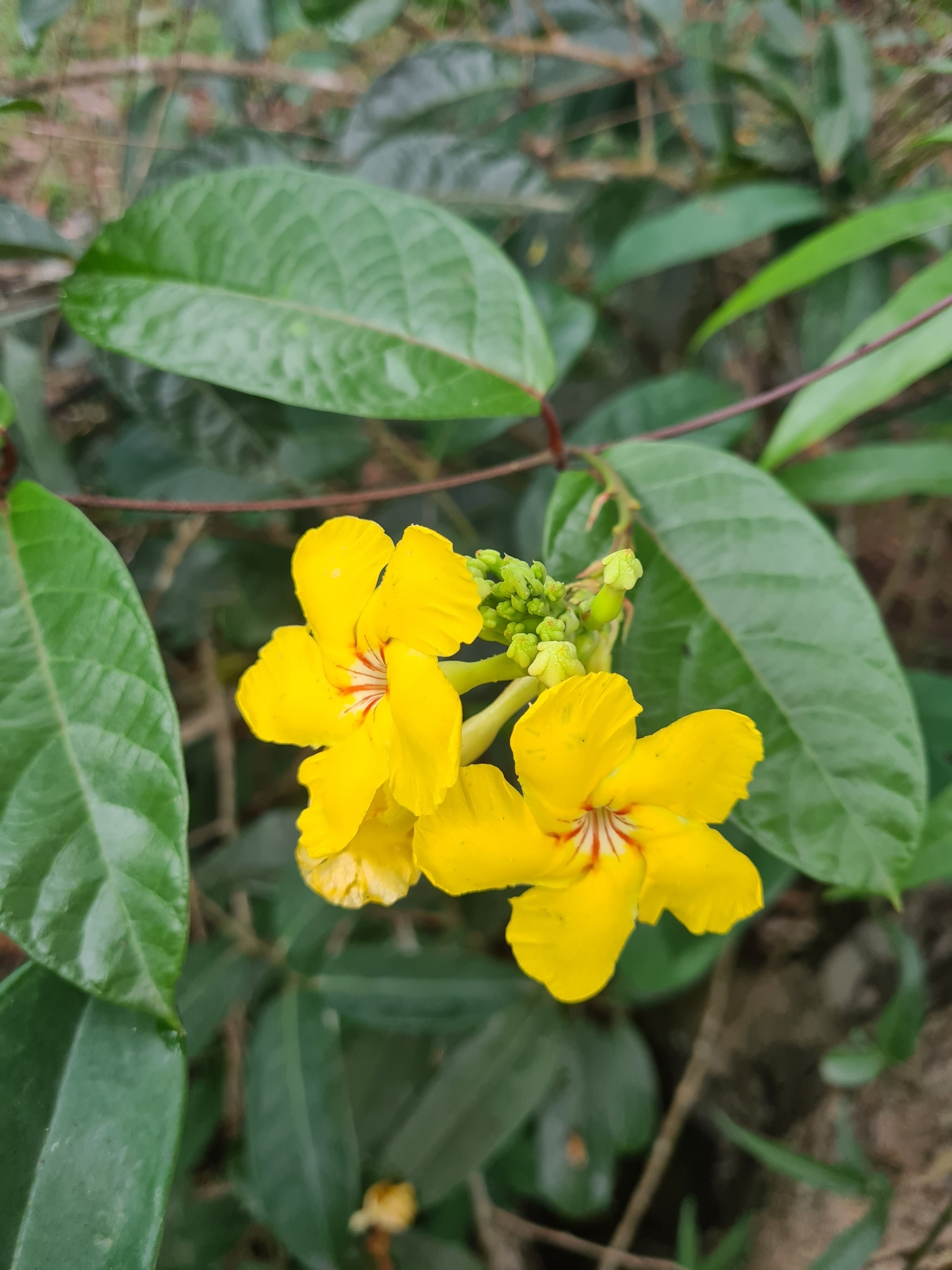

Scientific classification
- Kingdom: Plantae
- Clade: Tracheophytes
- Clade: Angiosperms
- Clade: Eudicots
- Clade: Asterids
- Order: Gentianales
- Family: Apocynaceae
- Genus: Mandevilla
- Species: M. rugellosa

Binomial name
- Mandevilla rugellosa (Rich.) L.Allorge

= Mandevilla rugellosa =

Species of plant

Mandevilla rugellosa is a species from the genus Mandevilla.
