= Robert Everard Woodson =

American botanist (1904–1963)

Robert Everard Woodson Jr.
- Born: April 28, 1904; St. Louis, Missouri, U.S.
- Died: November 6, 1963 (aged 59); St. Louis, Missouri, U.S.
- Education: Washington University
- Scientific career
- Fields: Botany
- Workplaces: Washington University

Robert Everard Woodson Jr. (April 28, 1904 – November 6, 1963) was an American botanist. The standard author abbreviation Woodson is used to indicate this person as the author when citing a botanical name. He received a degree in biology in 1929 from Washington University.

He taught botany at Washington University, and from 1945 to 1963 he was a full professor. He was also curator of the Missouri Botanical Garden. (Note: Contradictory dates are given for the time spans Robert Everard Woodson served as curator: Riley 1995 states it was from 1948 to 1955 and from 1958 to 1963; according to Stafleu & Cowan 1988 it was from 1955 to 1956 and from 1959 to 1963, plus a period during which he appears to have been an unofficial, de facto curator from 1945 to 1955.)
