= List of Sonoran Desert wildflowers =

The wildflowers of the Sonoran Desert typically appear after a rain, some after the winter rains, and some after the summer "monsoons."

== Amsinckia menziesii ==
- Common name: common fiddleneck
- Flowers bloom March through May
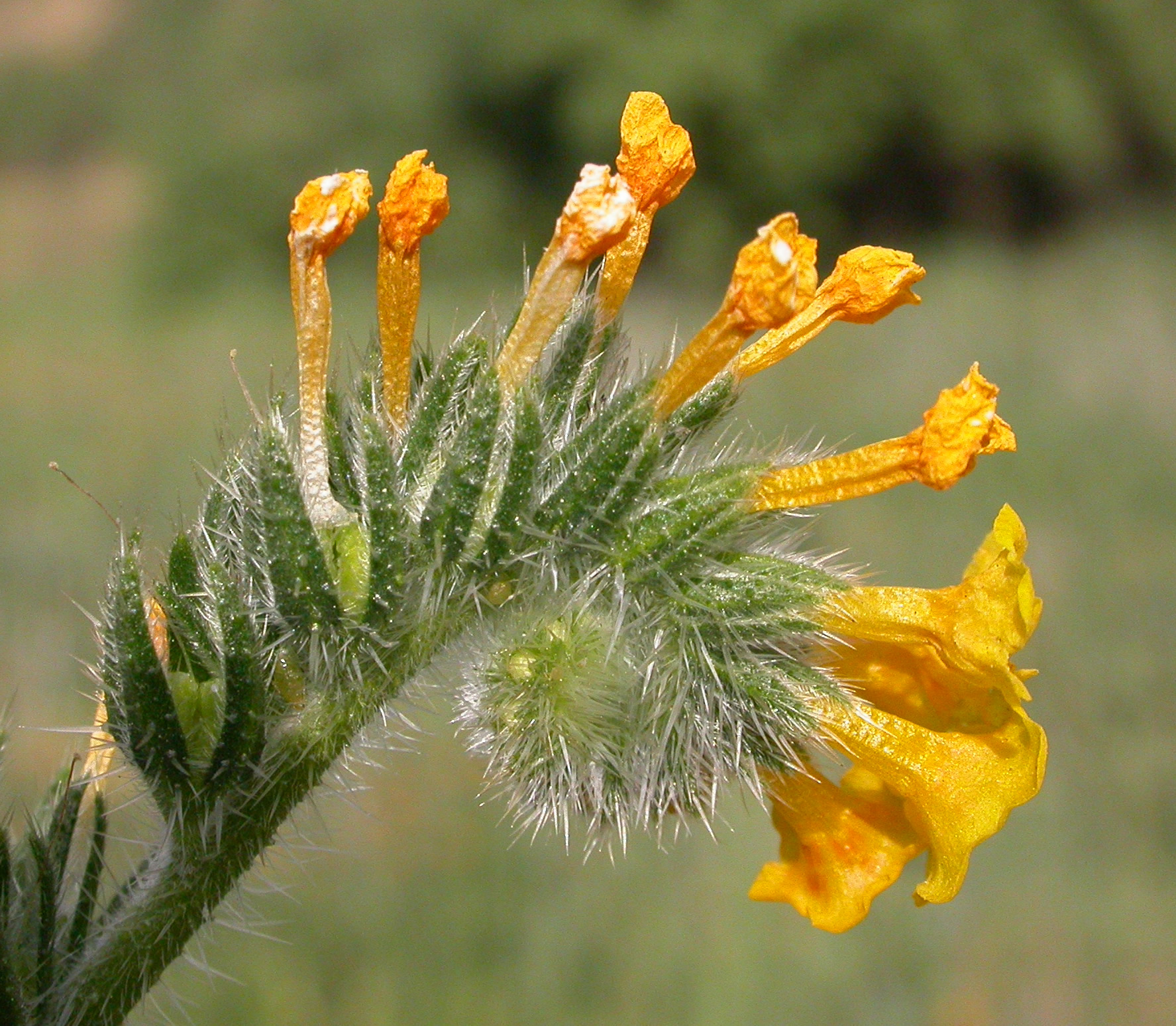

== Anemone tuberosa ==
- Common name: desert anemone
- Flowers bloom February to April

== Bahia absinthifolia ==
- Common name: hairyseed bahia, silverleaf bahia
- Flowers bloom spring through fall

== Brickellia coulteri ==
- Common name: Coulter's brickellbush
- Flowers bloom March to November

== Carlowrightia arizonica ==
- Common name: Arizona wrightwort
- Flowers bloom in the spring

== Cryptantha albida ==
- Common name: New Mexico catseye, New Mexico cryptantha
- Flowers bloom in early spring

== Cryptantha angustifolia ==
- Common name: Panamint catseye, bristlelobe cryptantha
- Flowers bloom in early spring
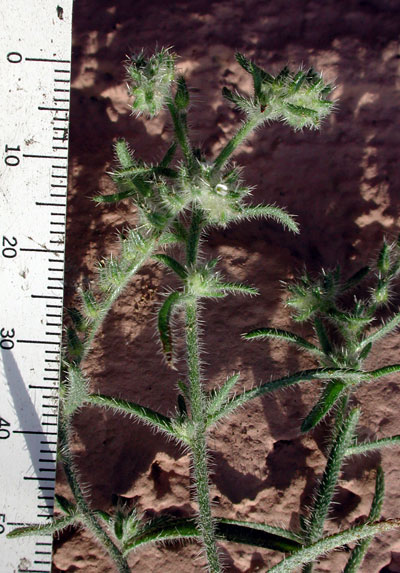

== Daucus pusillus ==
- Common name: American wild carrot
- Flowers bloom March to May

== Datura innoxia ==
- Common name: pricklyburr

== Dipterostemon capitatus ==
- Common name: bluedicks
- Flowers bloom February to May
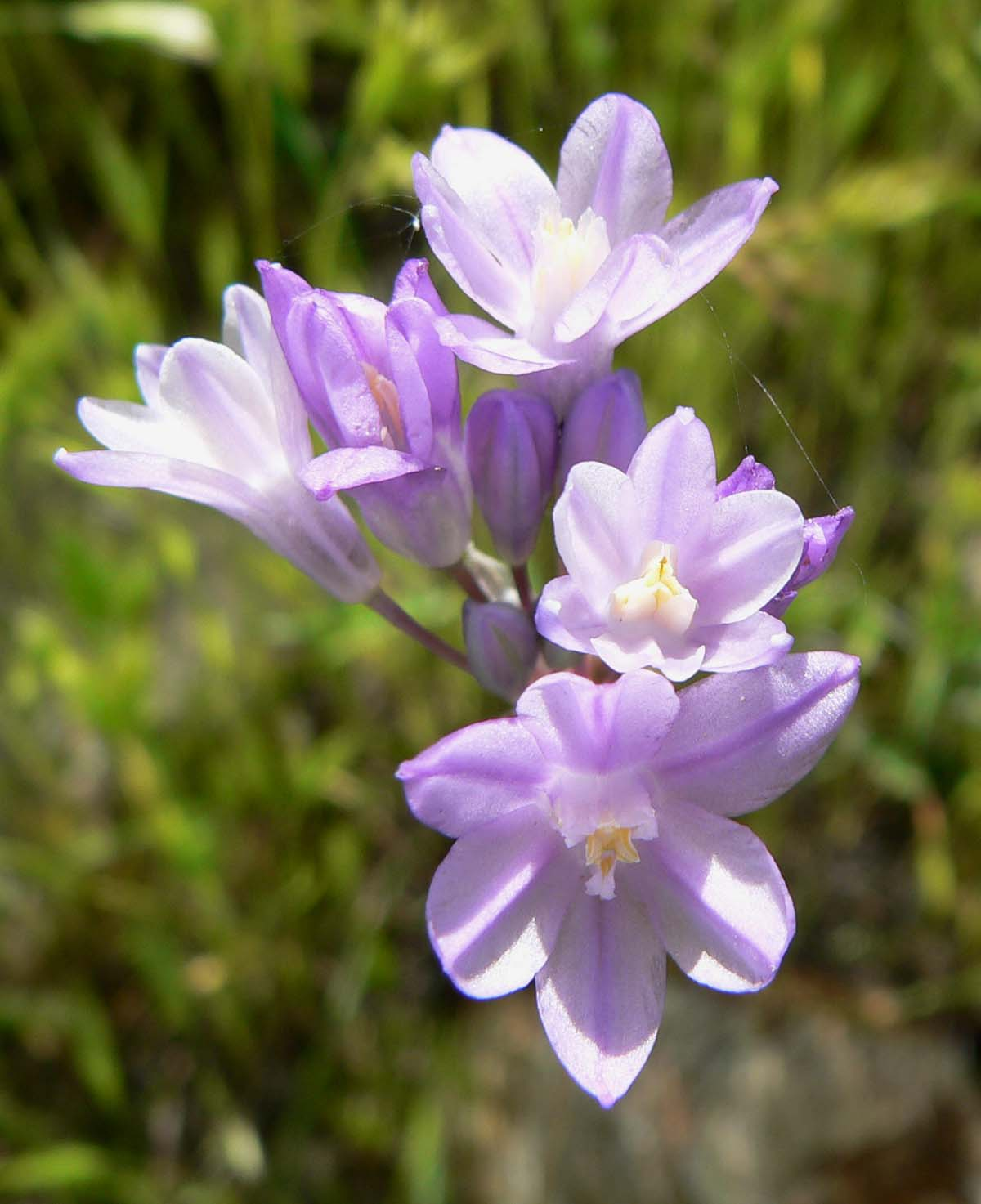

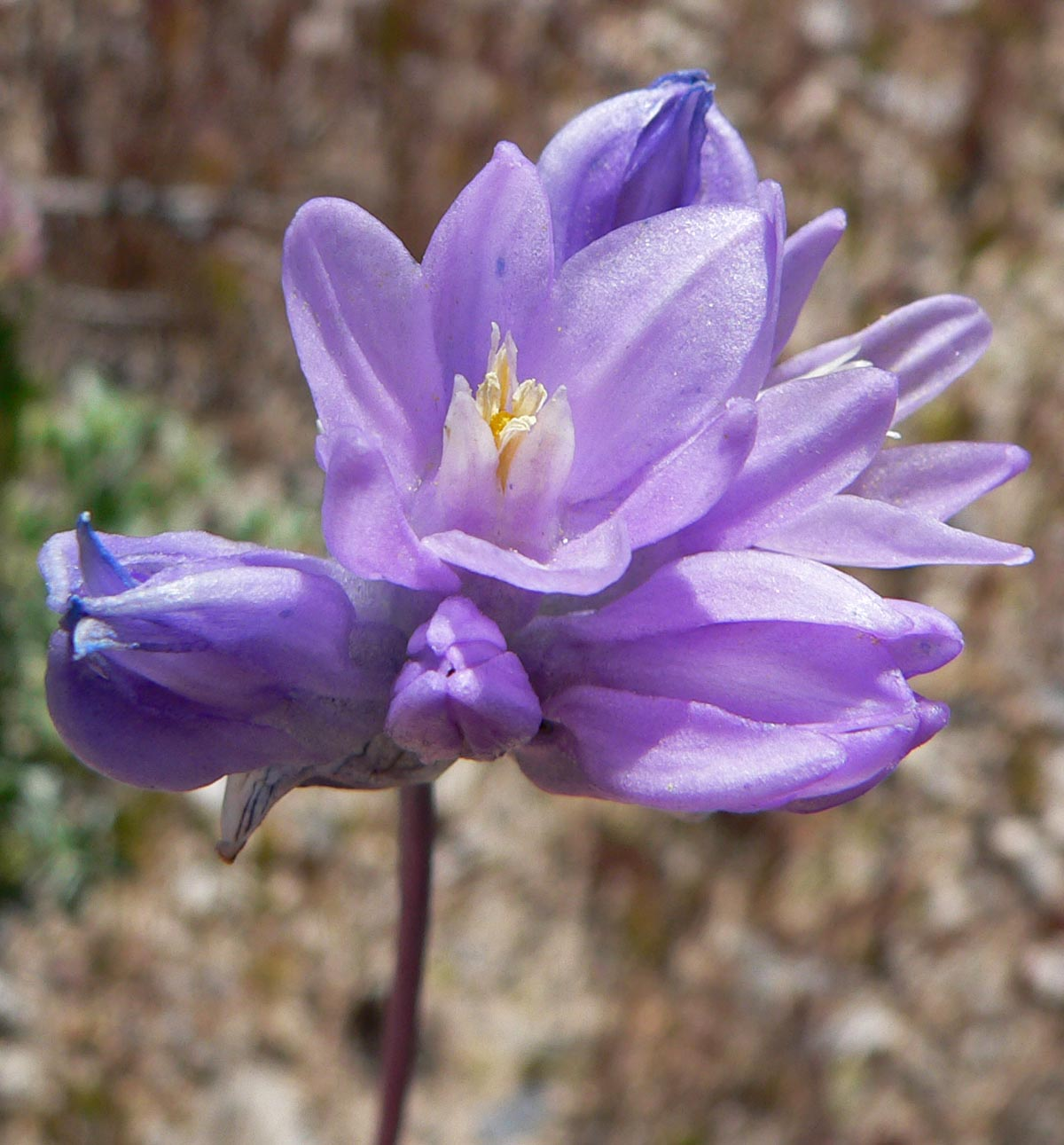

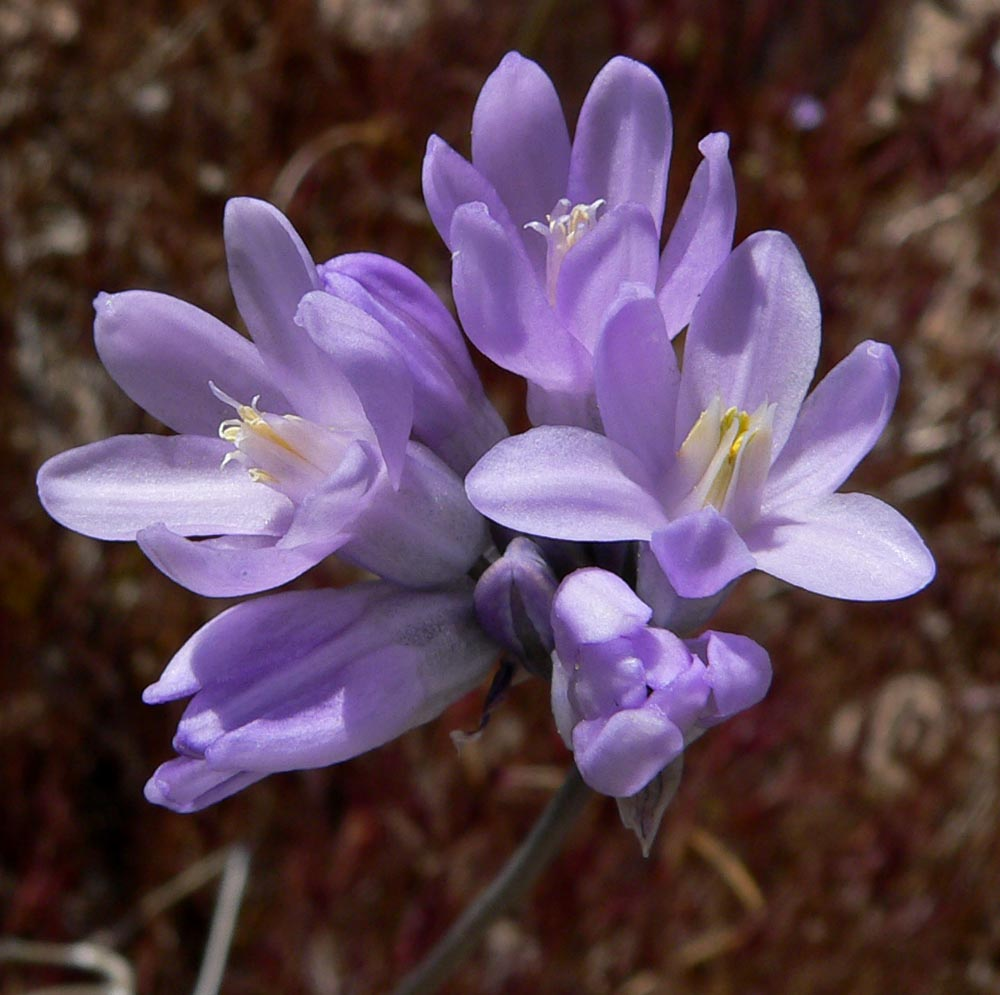

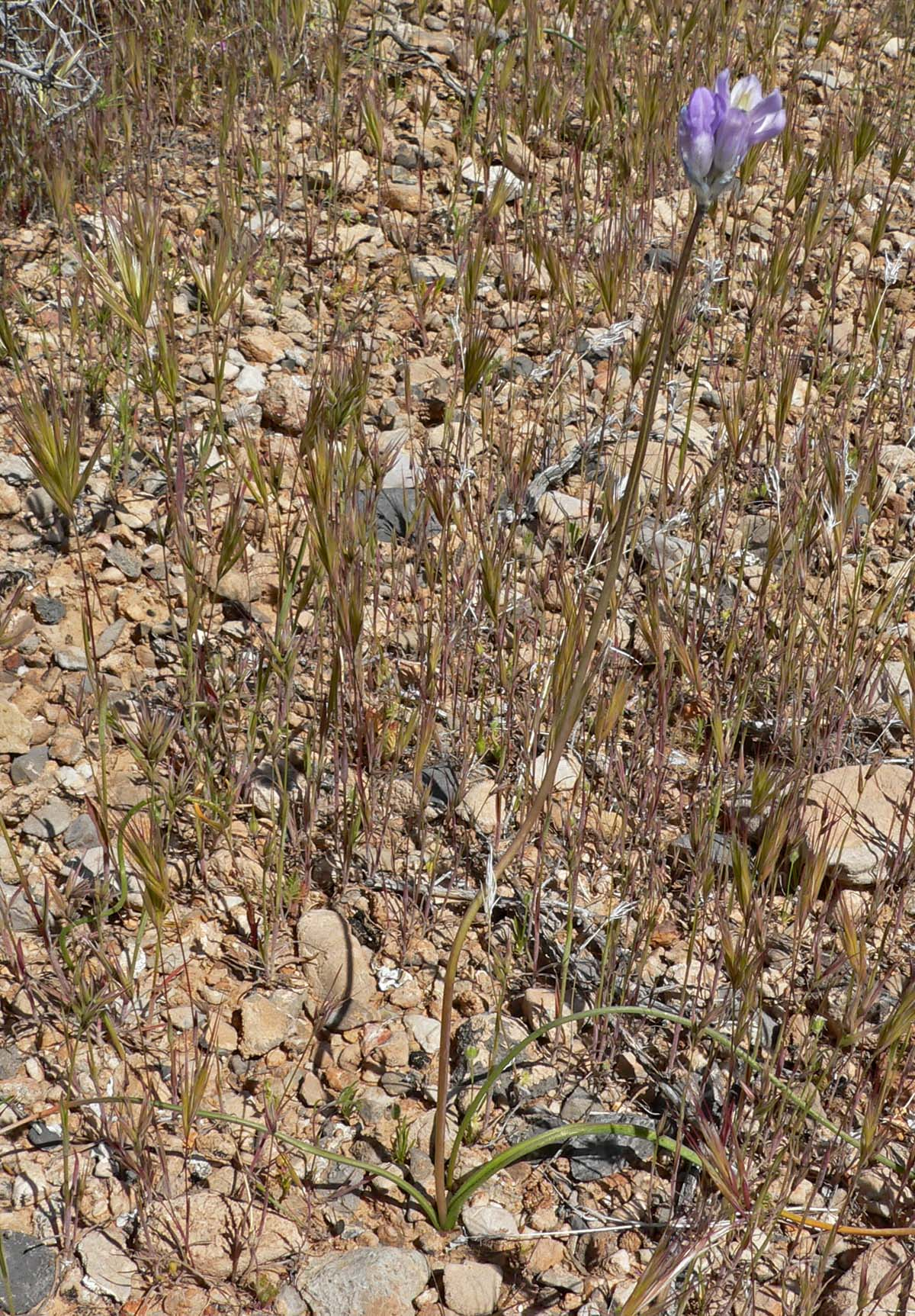

== Encelia farinosa ==
- Common name: brittlebush
- Flowers bloom in the spring
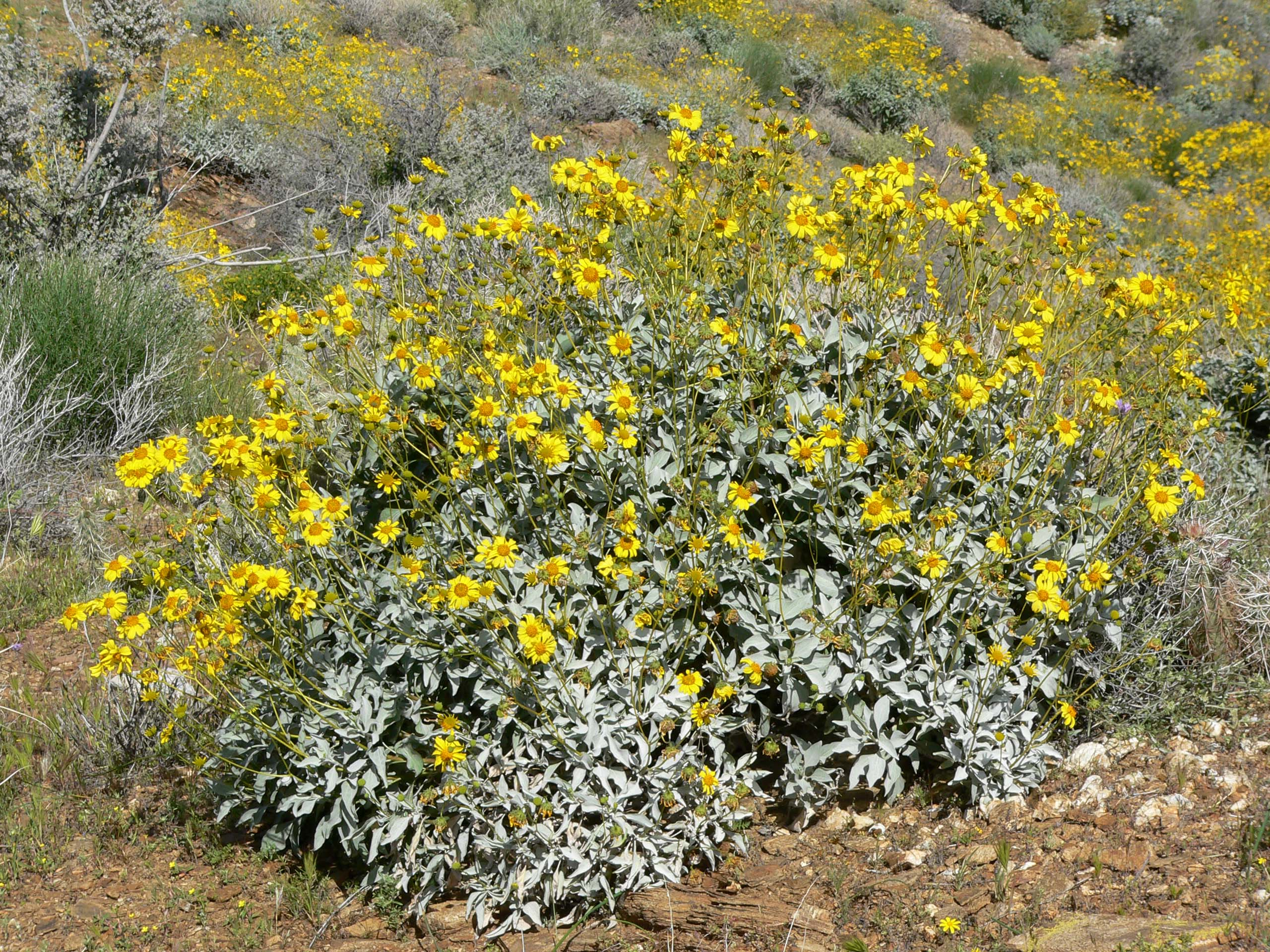

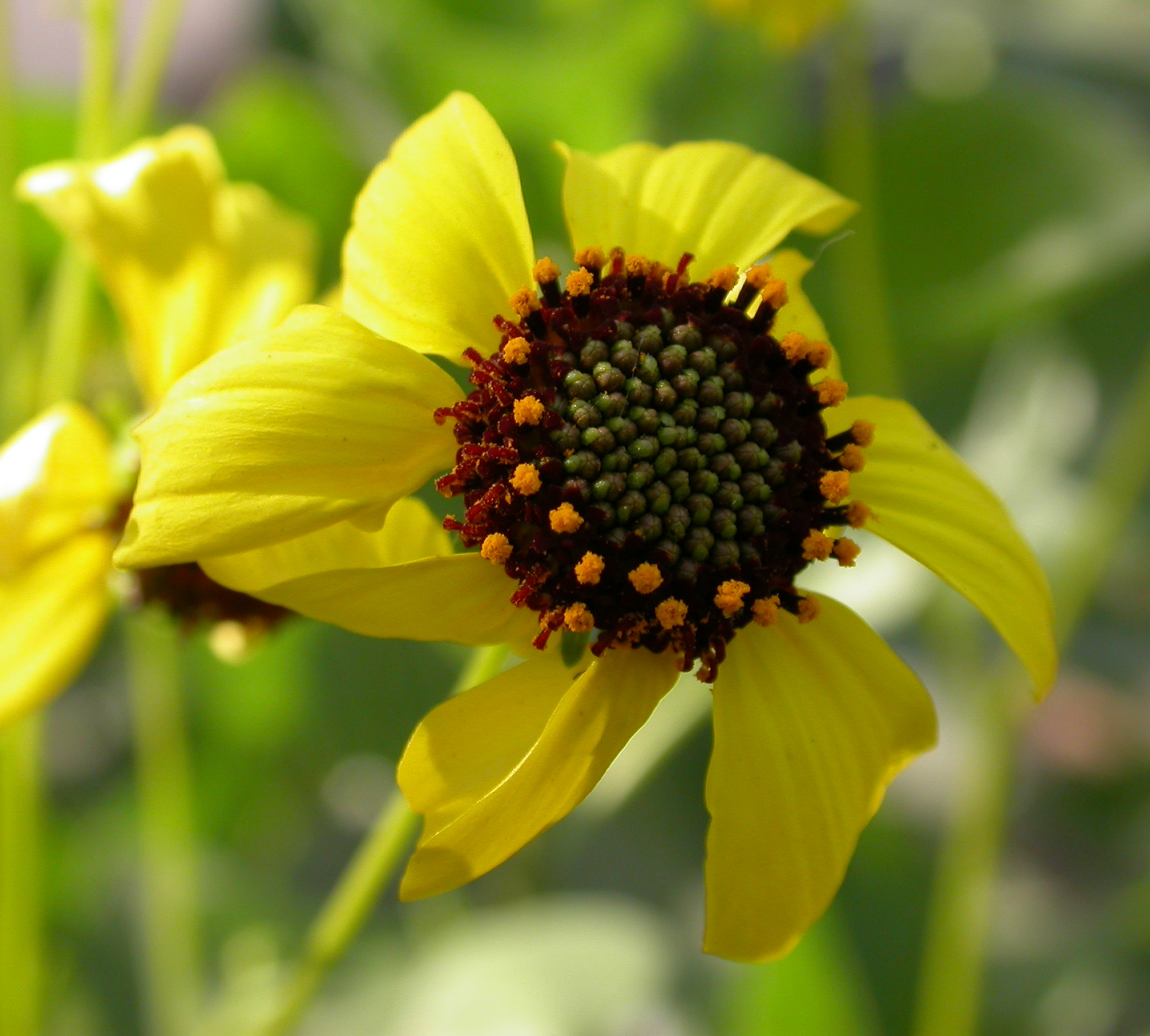

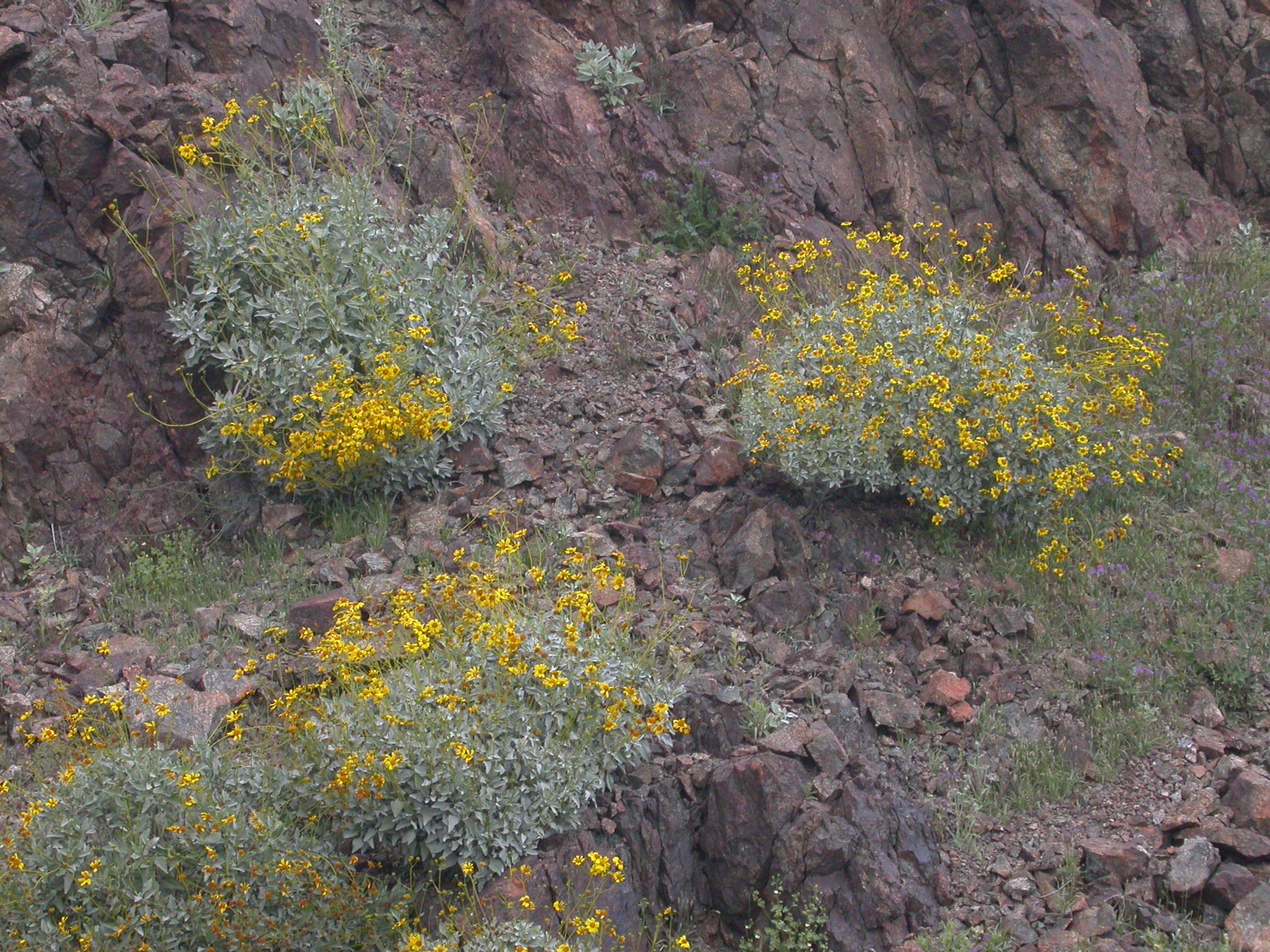

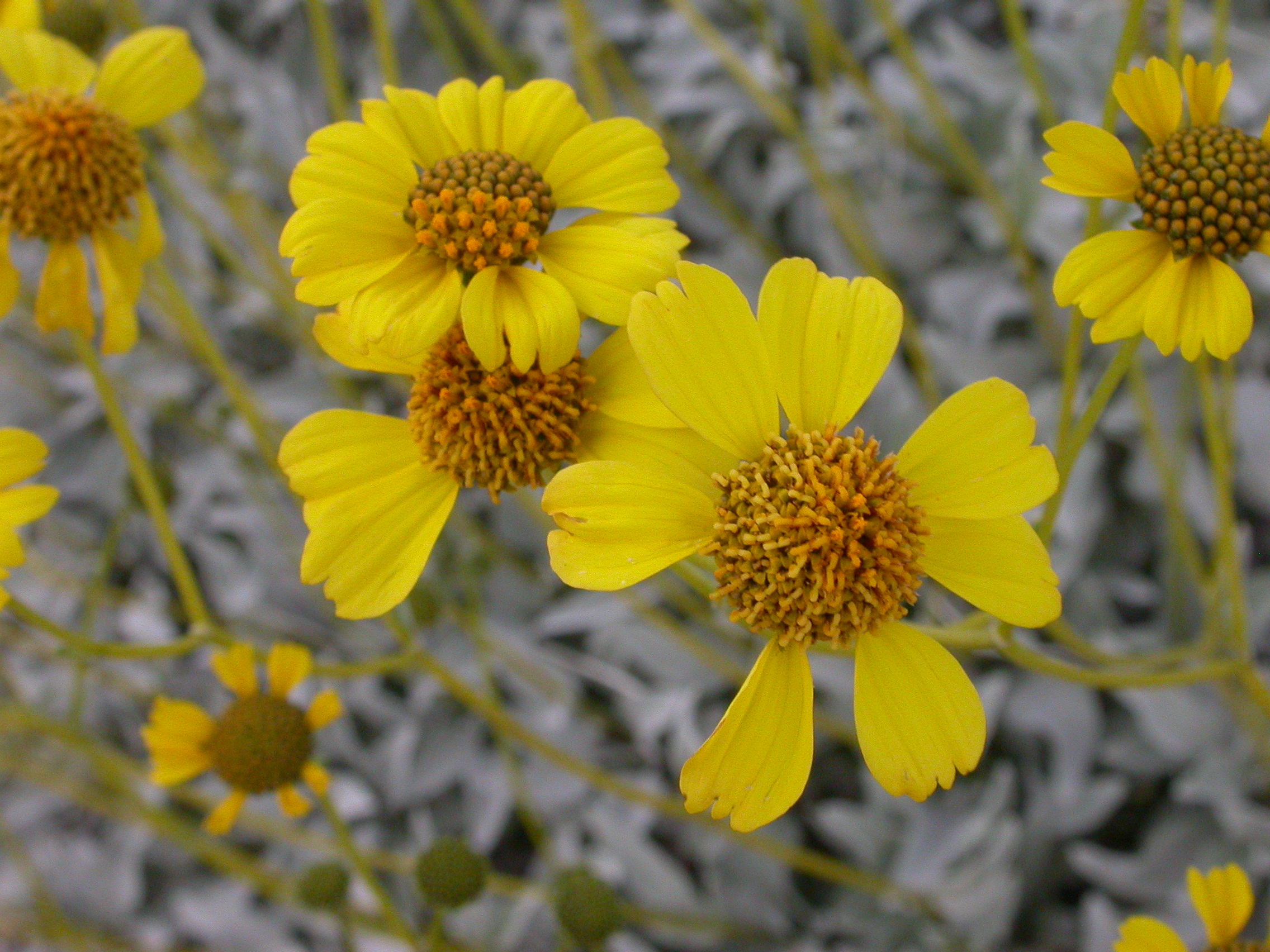

== Eriophyllum lanosum ==
- Common name: white woolly daisy
- Flowers bloom February through May

== Galium aparine ==
- Common name: common bedstraw, cleavers, stickywilly
- Flowers bloom in the spring
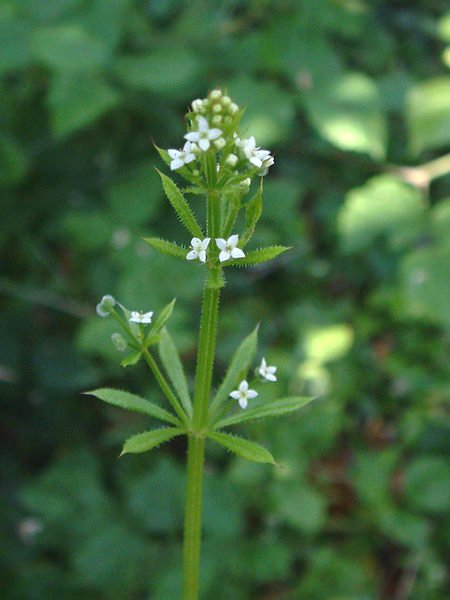

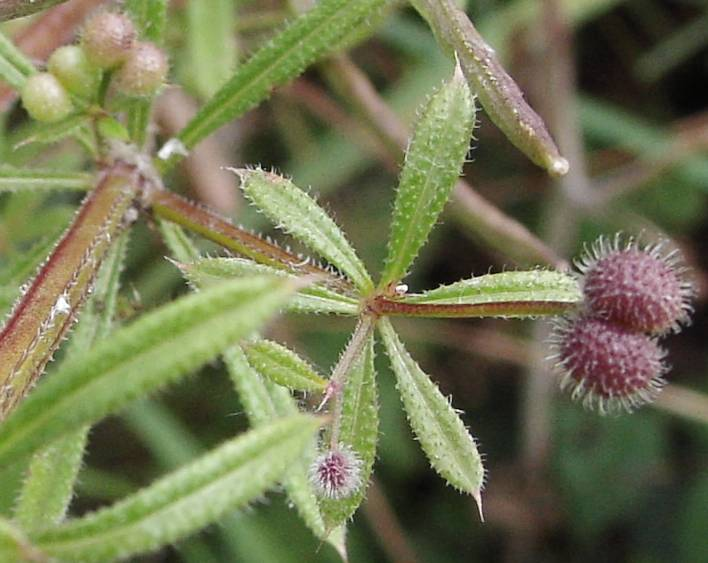

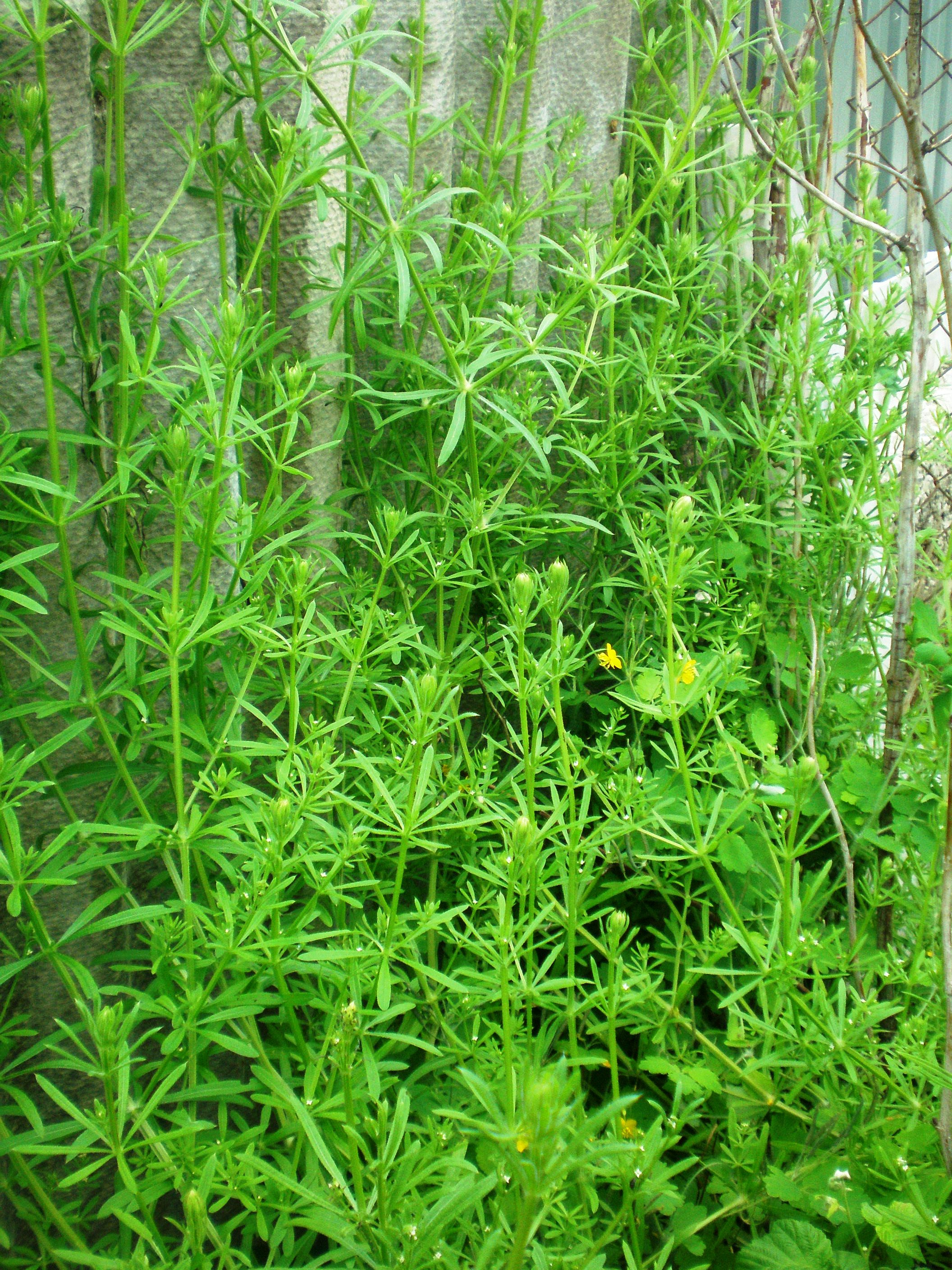

== Geraea canescens ==
- Common name: desert sunflower, hairy desert sunflower, desert gold
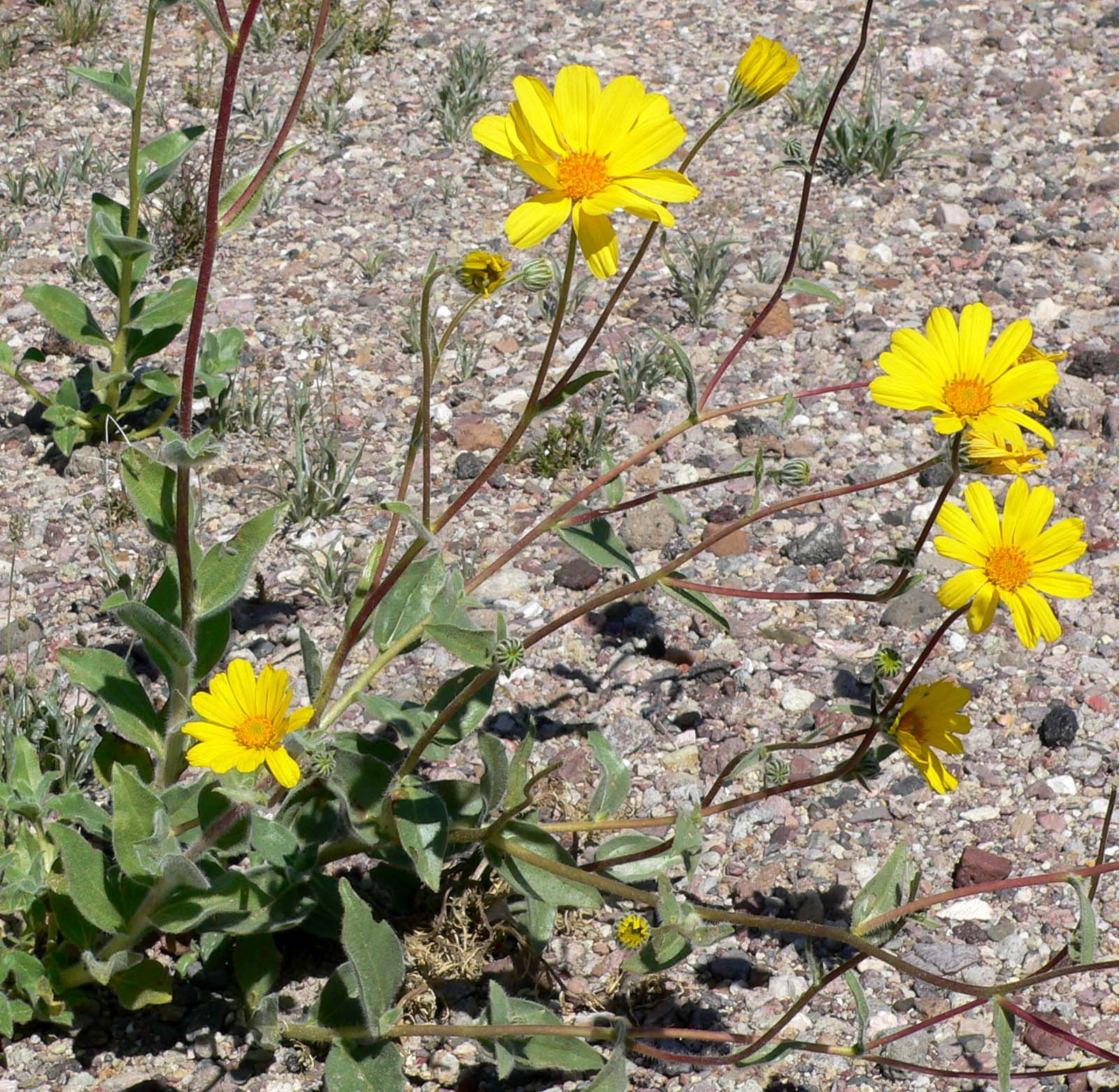

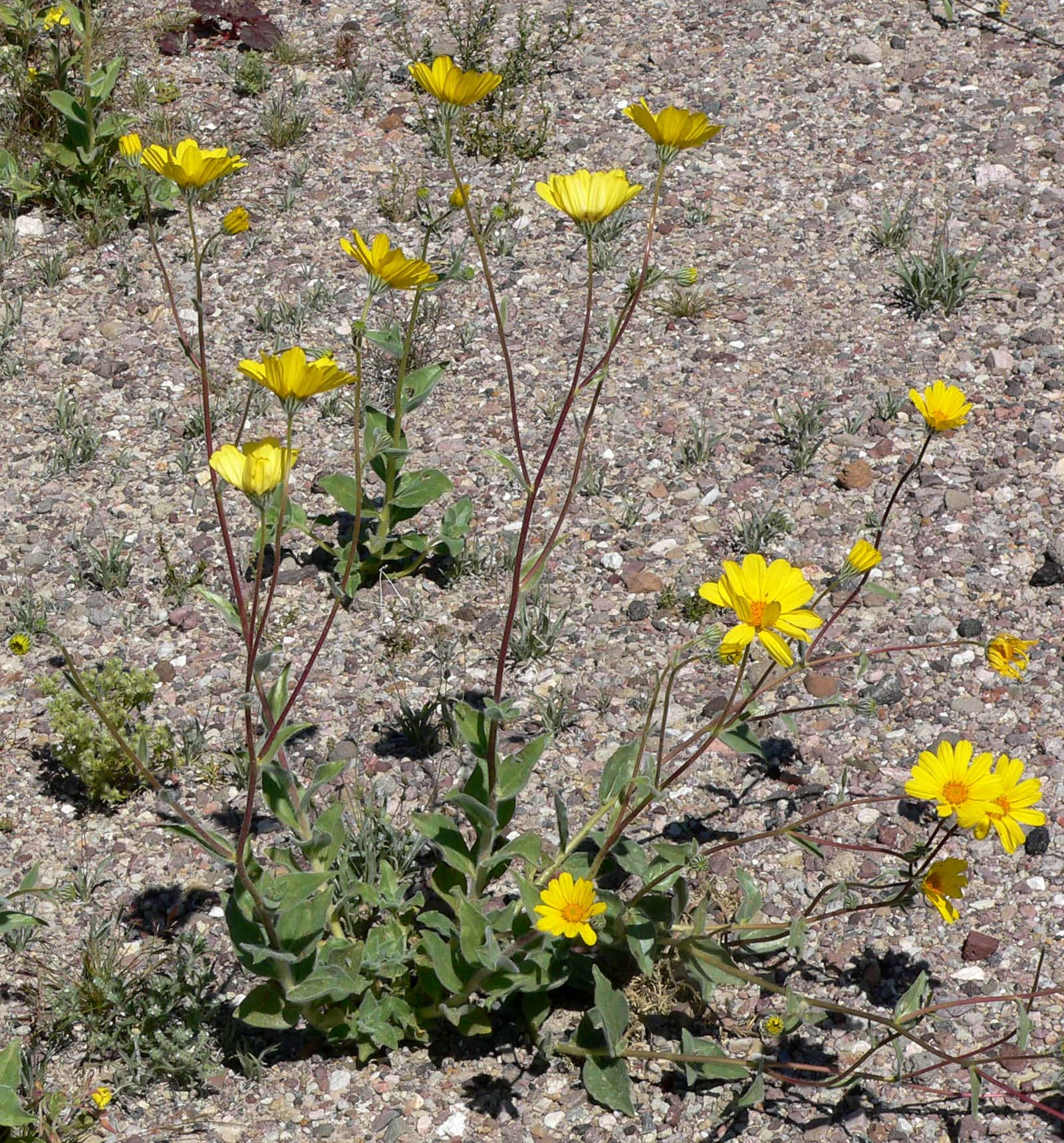

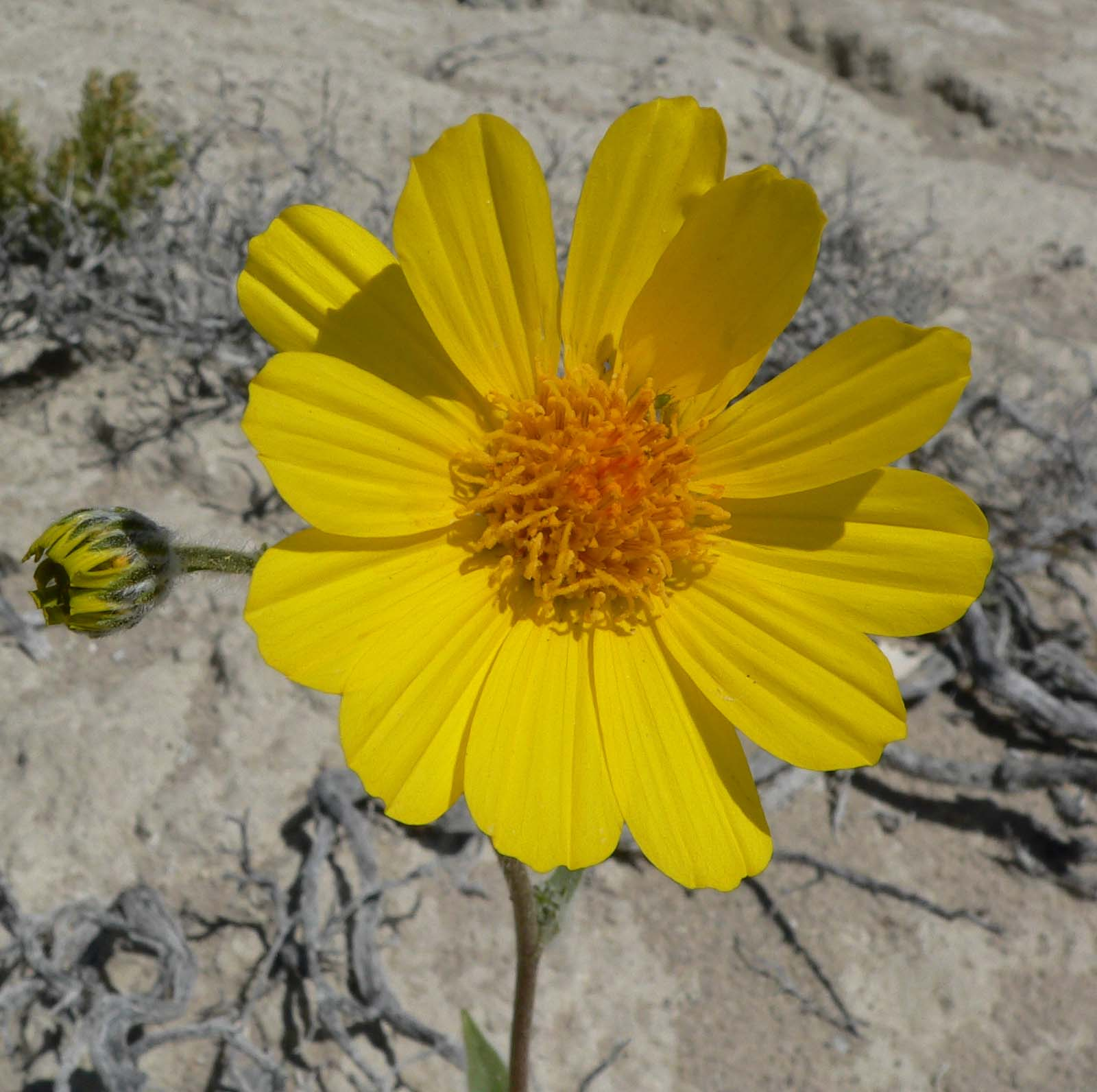

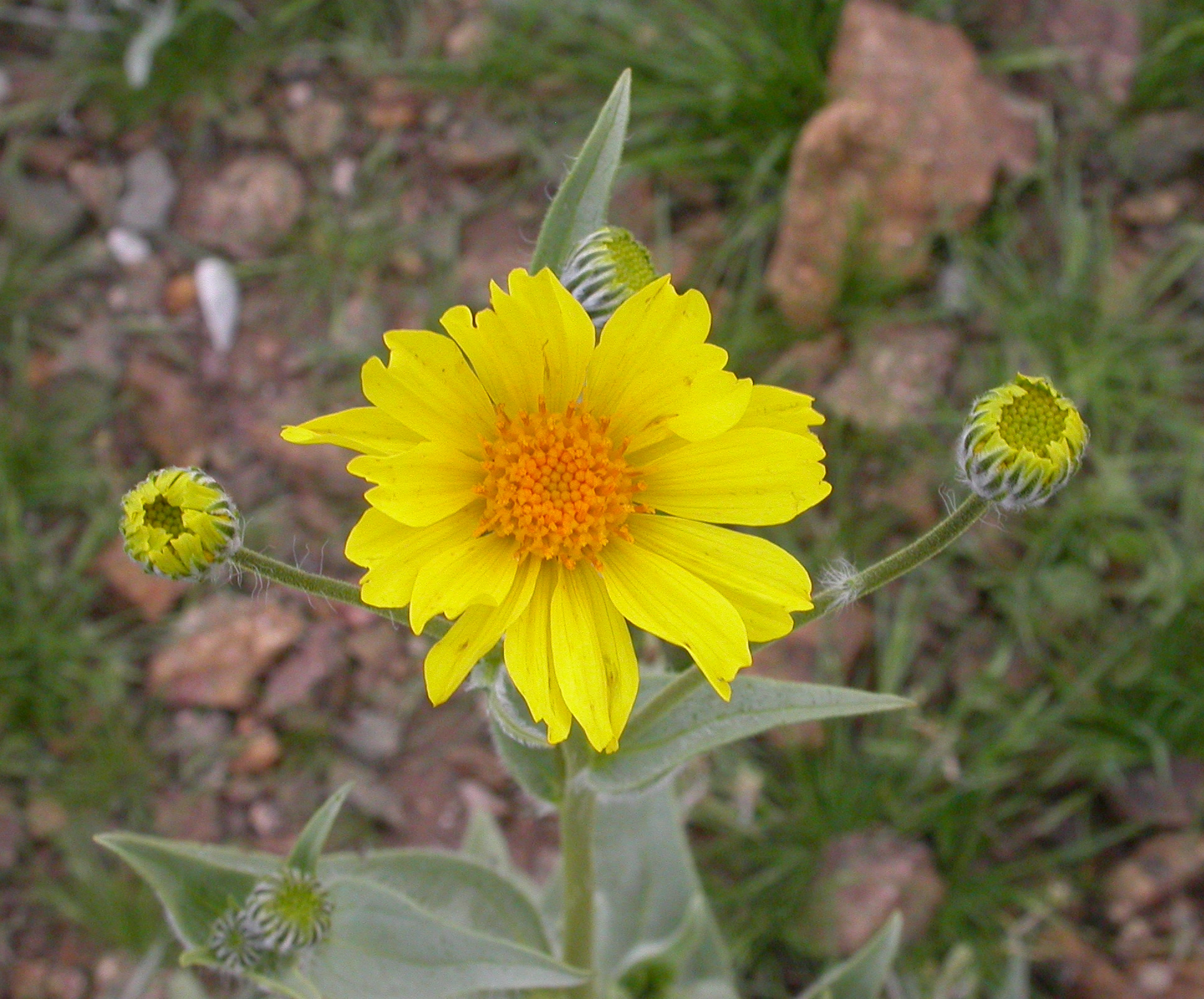

== Glandularia gooddingii ==
- Common name: Gooding's verbena, southwestern mock vervain
- Flowers bloom winter, spring, and fall

== Haplophyton crooksii ==
- Common name: cockroachplant
- Flowers bloom March to April and July to November

== Isocoma tenuisecta ==
- Common name: burroweed, shrine jimmyweed, burrow goldenweed
- Flowers bloom in September through November
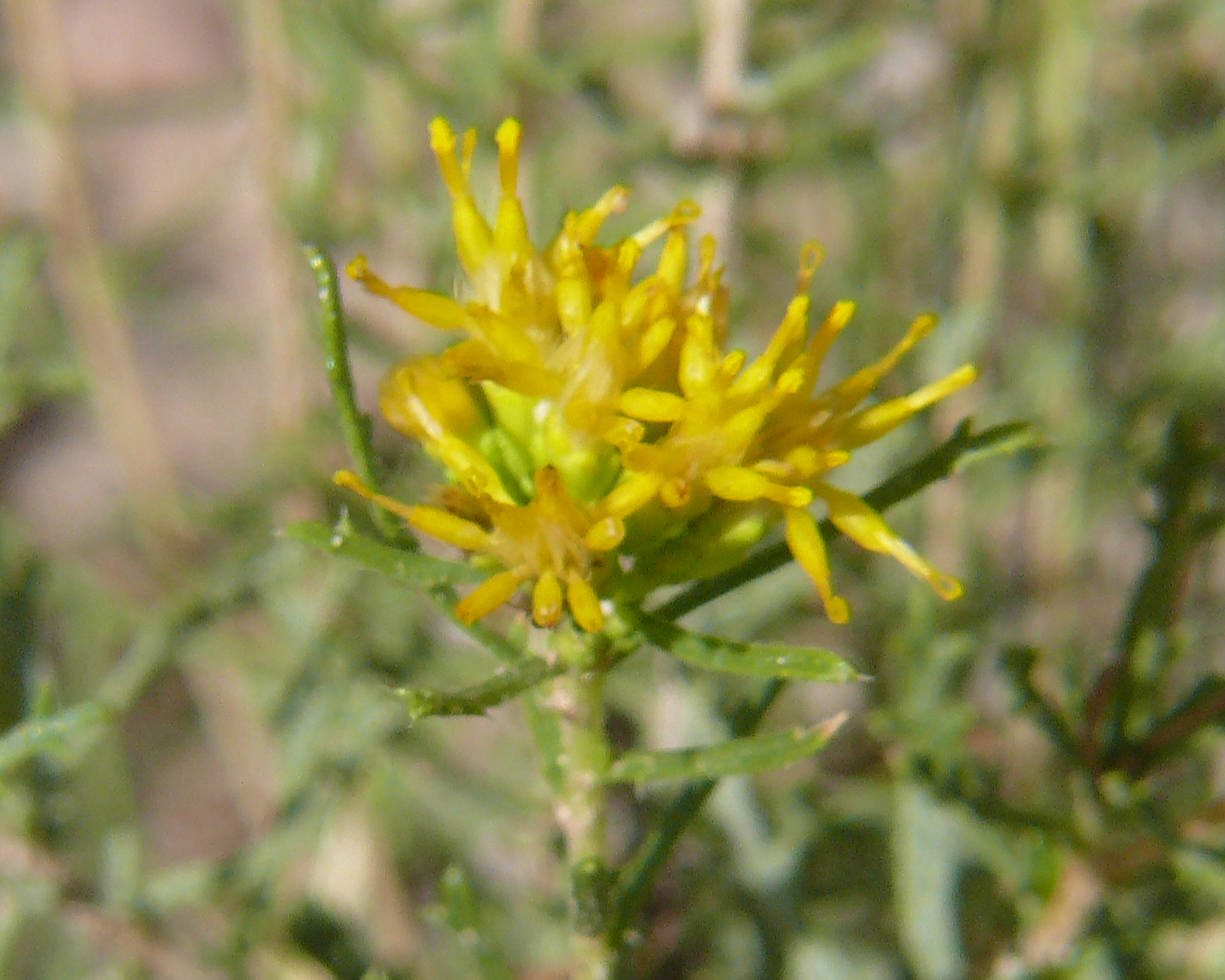

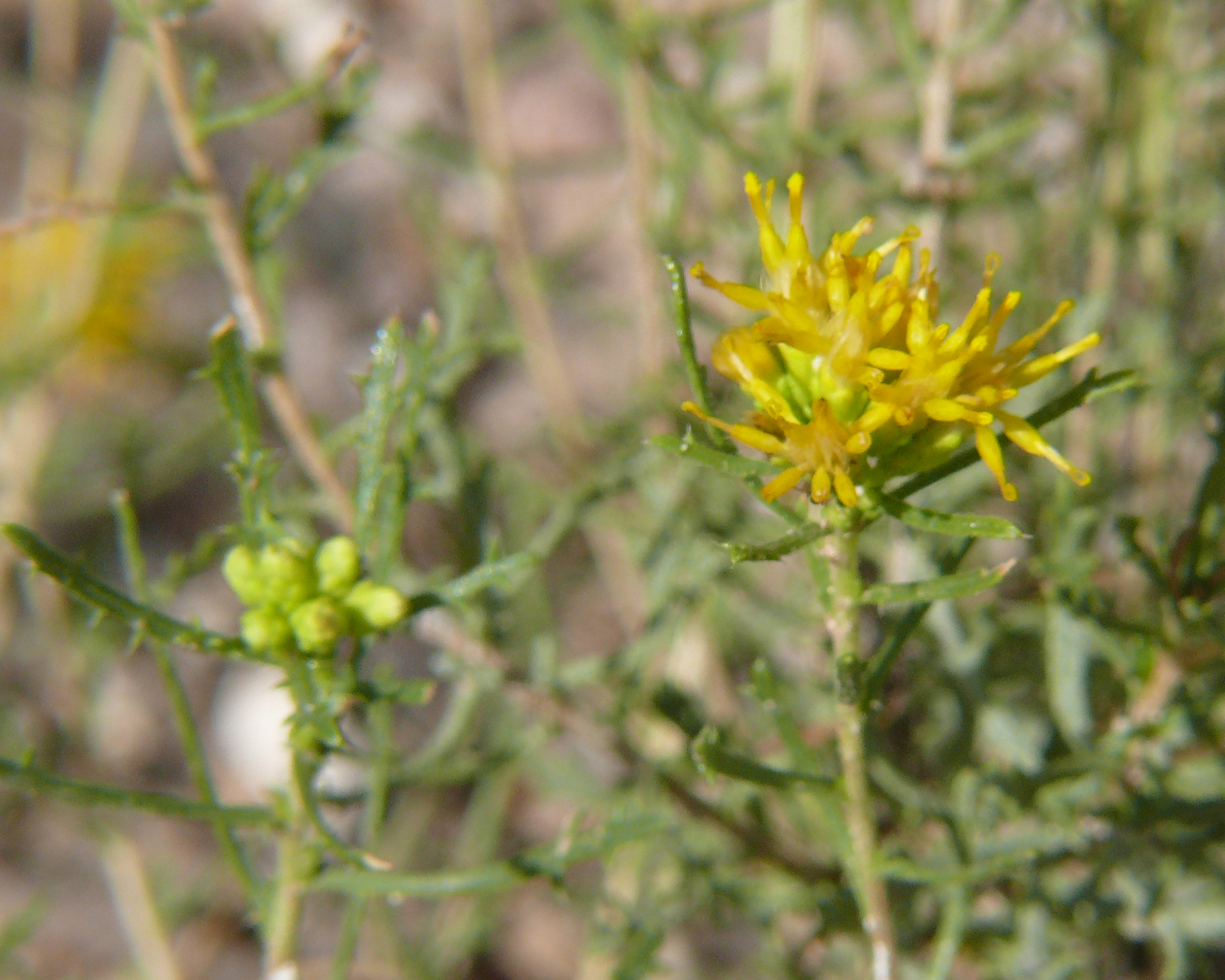

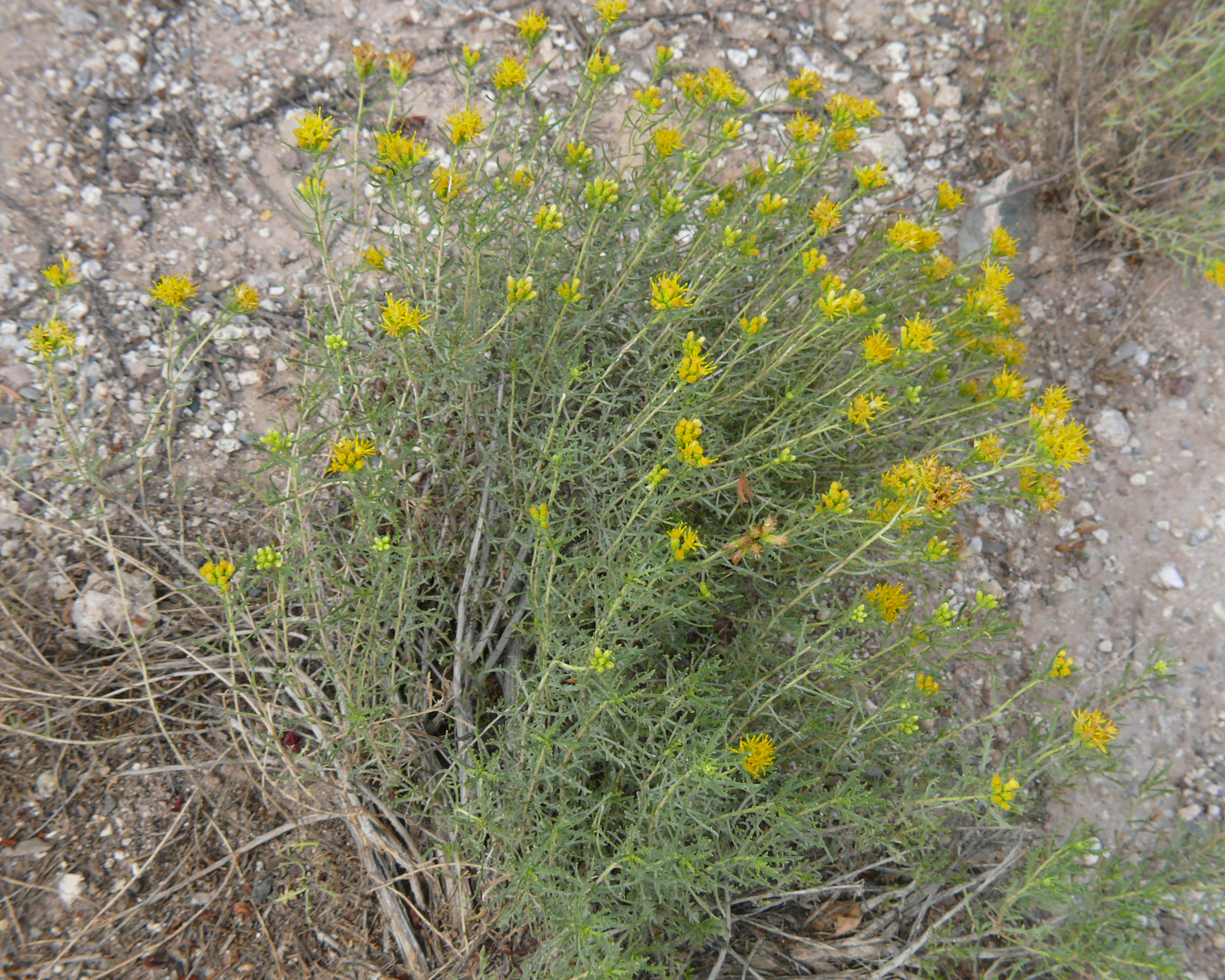

== Justicia californica ==
- Common name: beloperone, chuparosa
- Flowers bloom in the spring
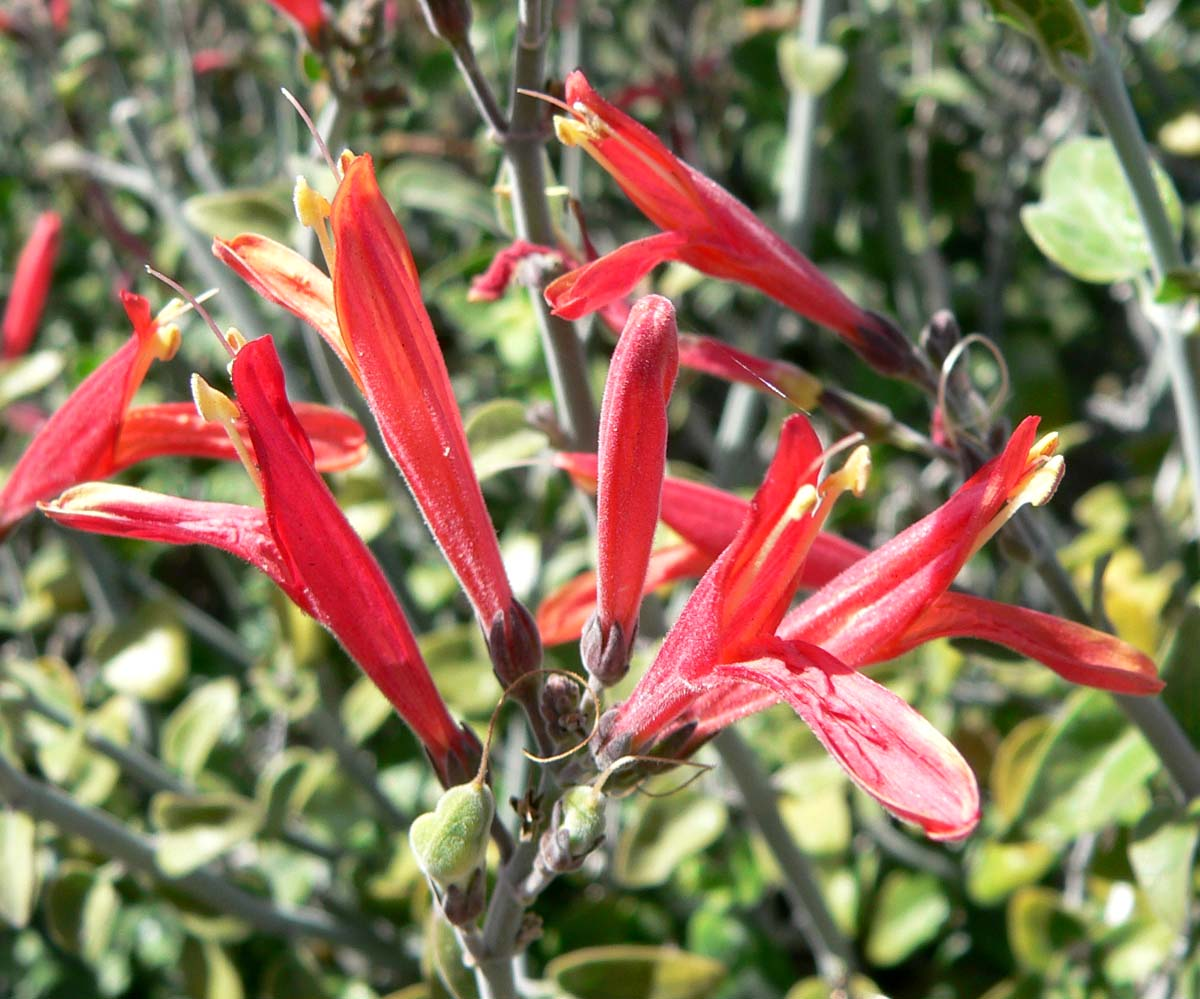

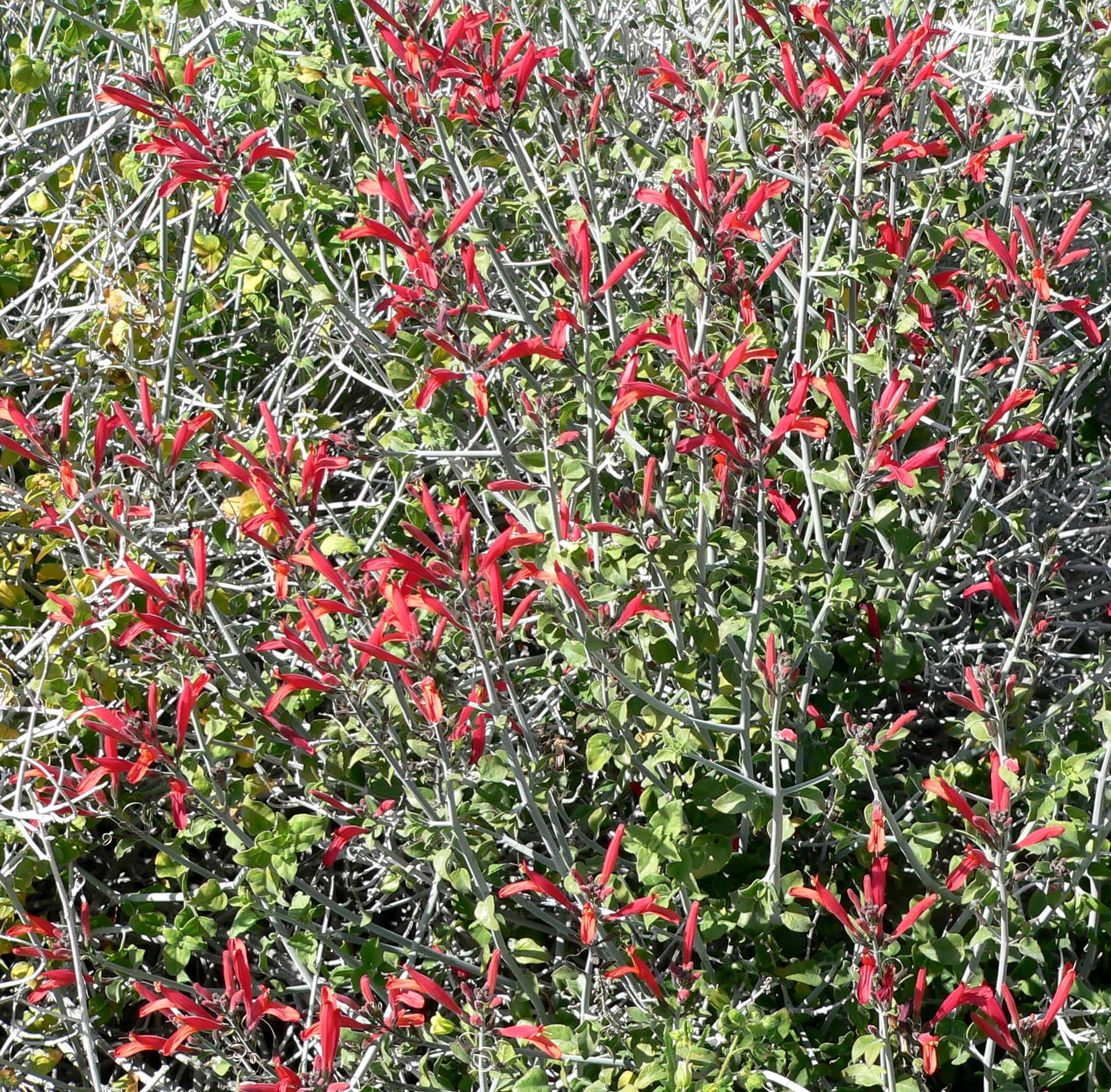

== Machaeranthera gracilis ==
- Common name: slender goldenweed, yellow spiny daisy
- Flowers bloom February to December

== Malacothrix californica ==
- Common name: California desertdandelion

== Marina parryi ==
- Common name: Parry's false prairie-clover

== Melampodium leucanthum ==
- Common name: plains blackfoot, blackfoot daisy
- Flowers bloom March through December
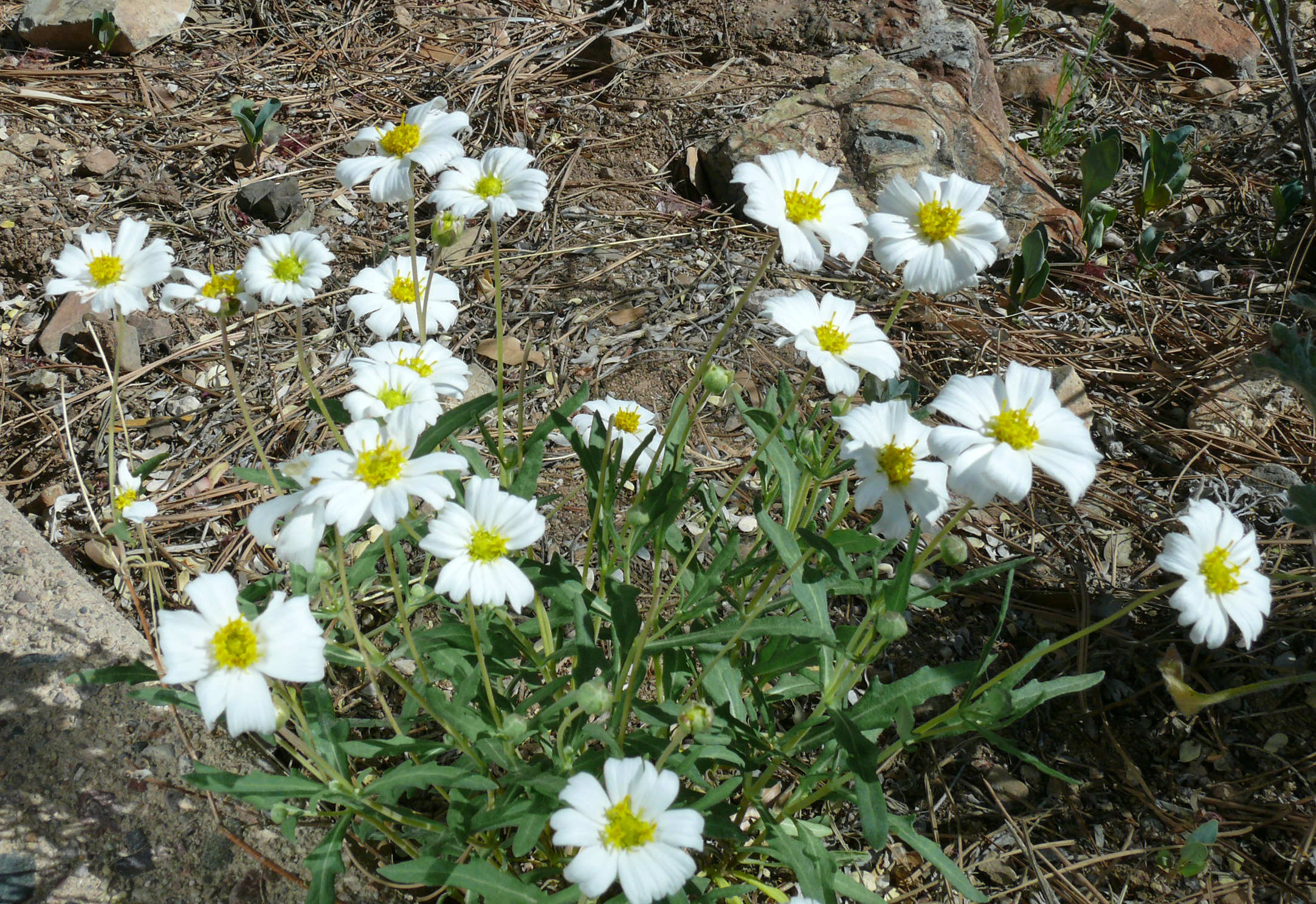

== Monoptilon bellioides ==
- Common name: Mojave desert star

== Nama demissa ==
- Common name: purplemat
- Flowers bloom from February to May
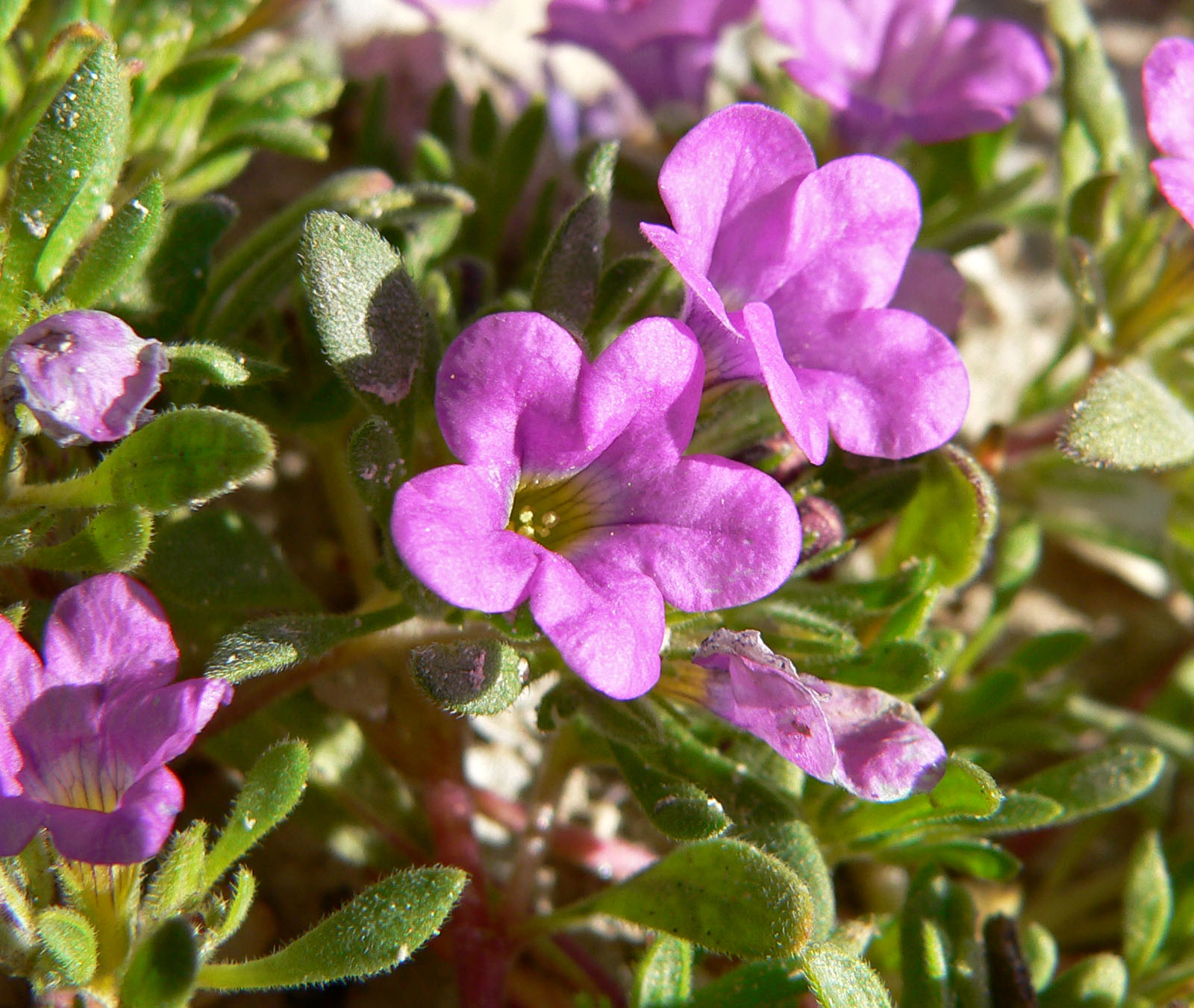

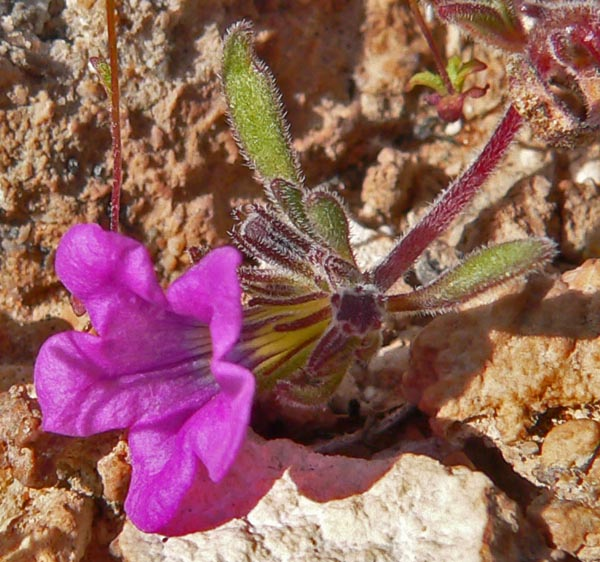

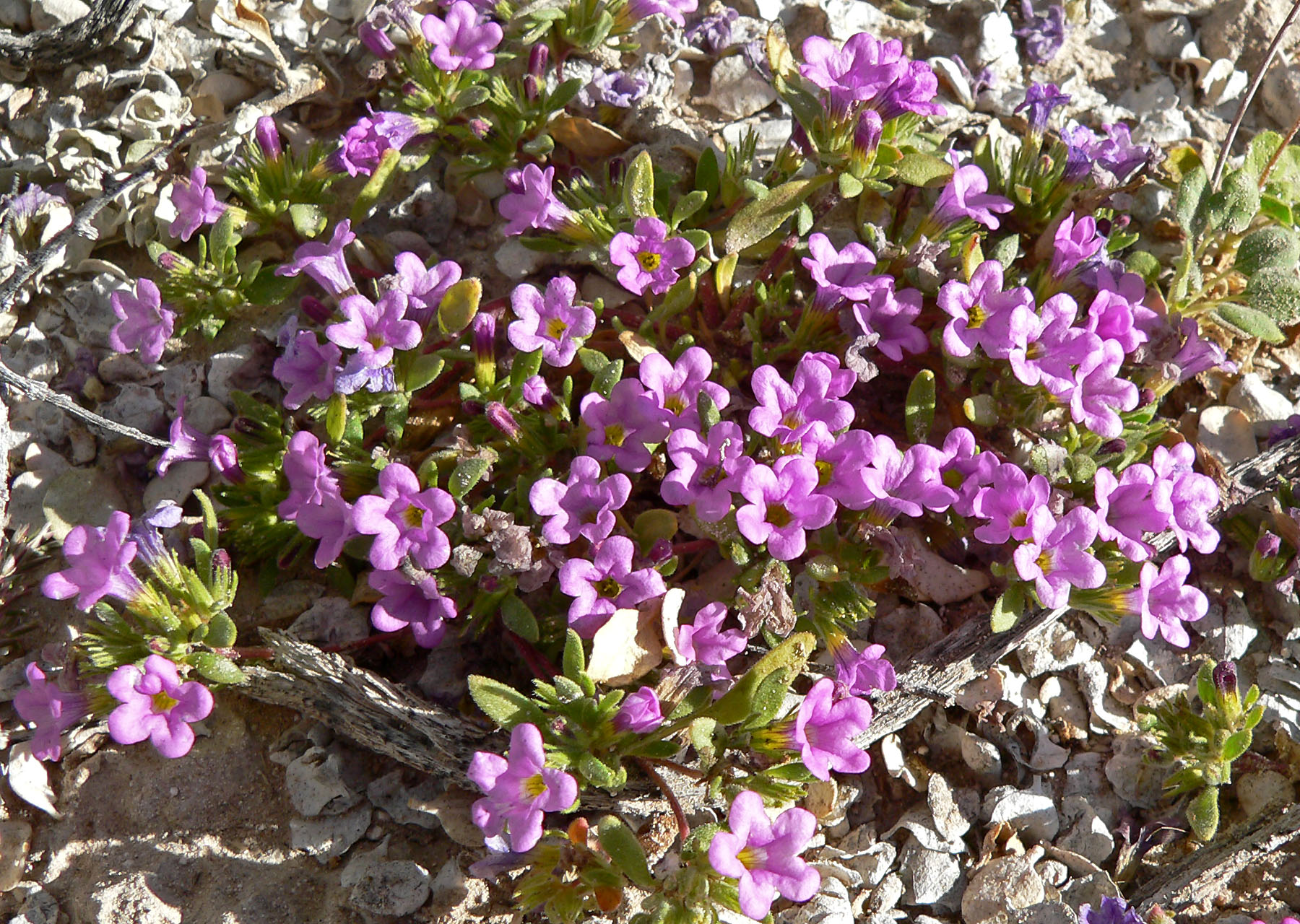

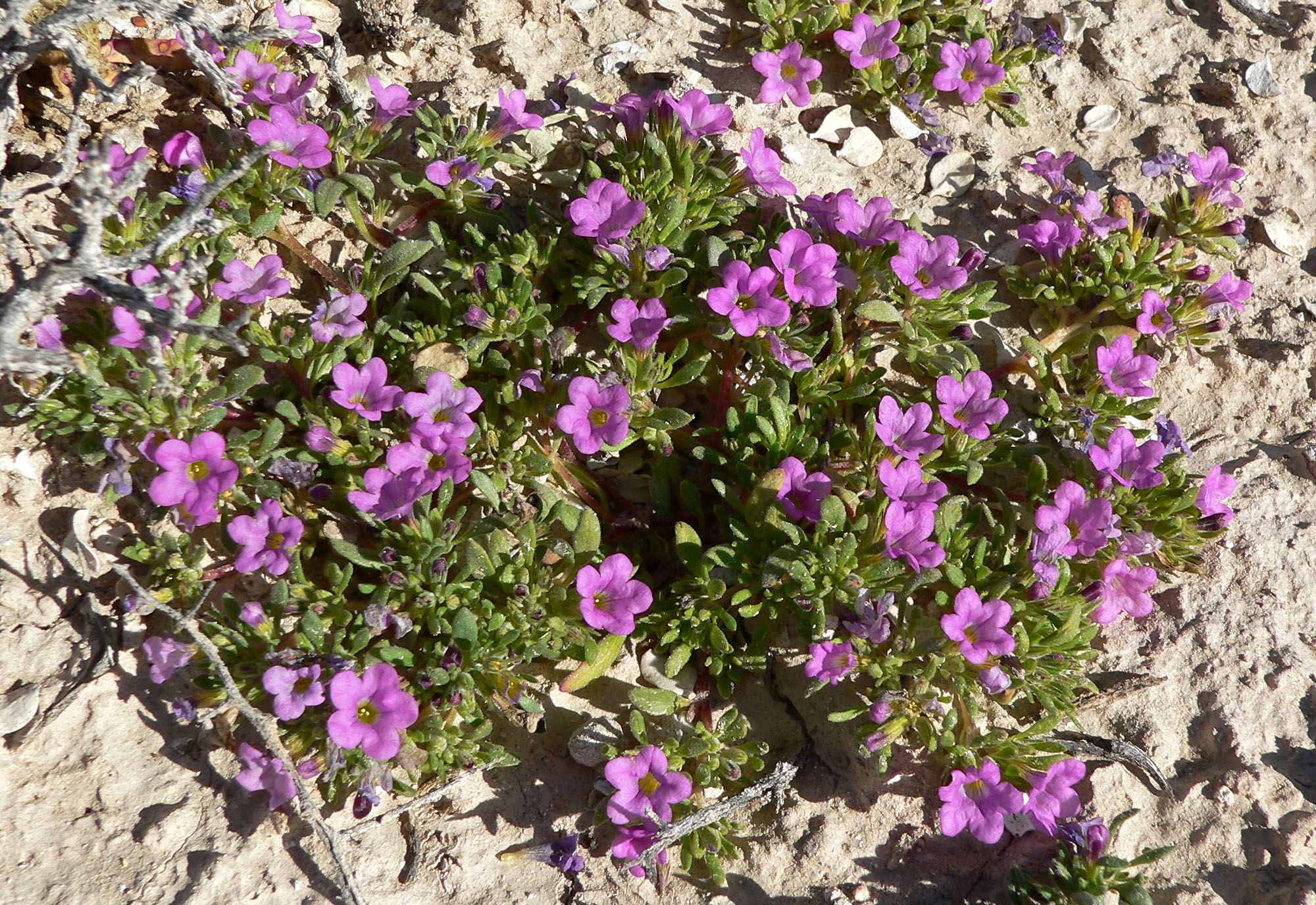

== Nicotiana obtusifolia ==
- Common name: desert tobacco, coyote tobacco
- Flowers bloom spring to fall
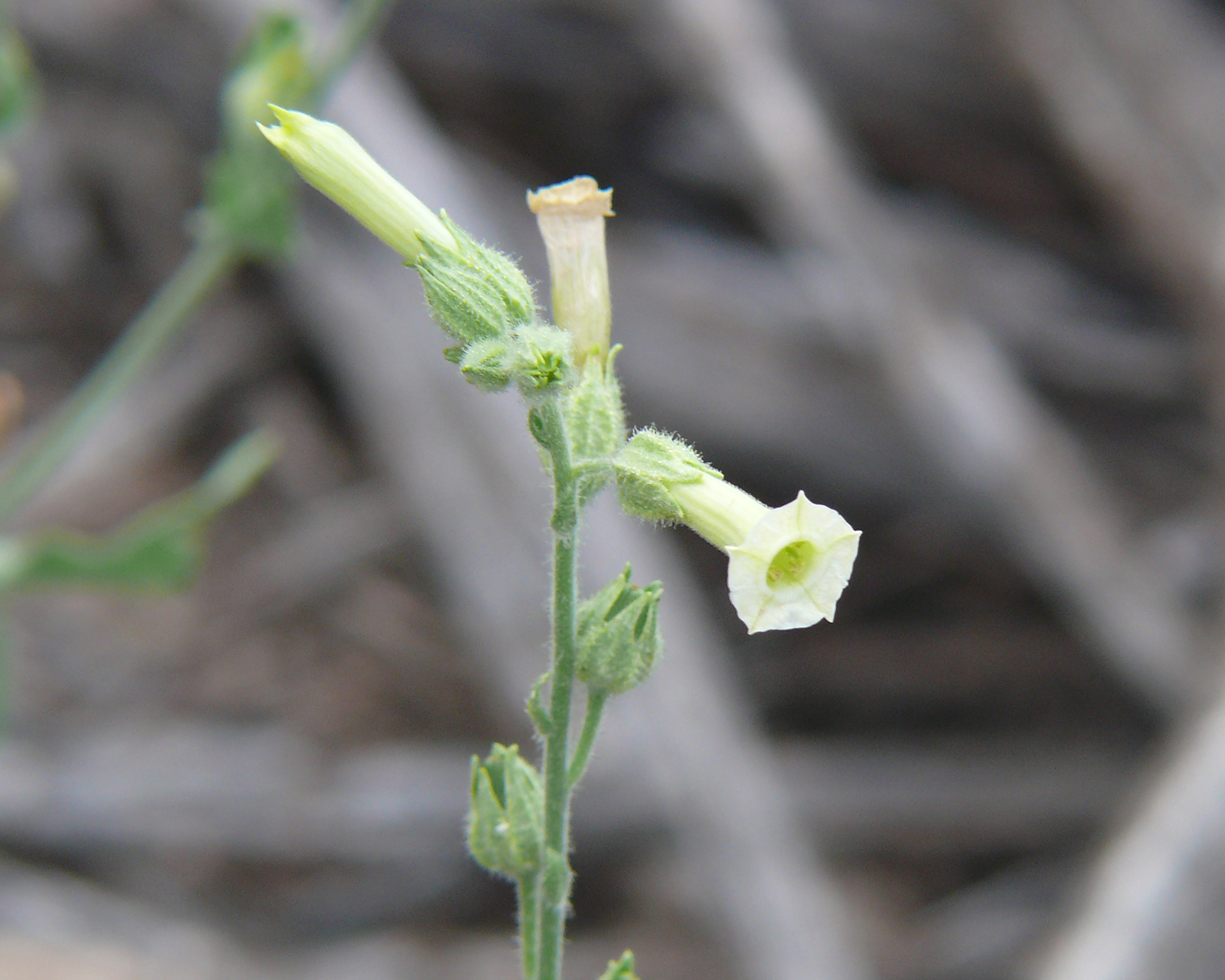

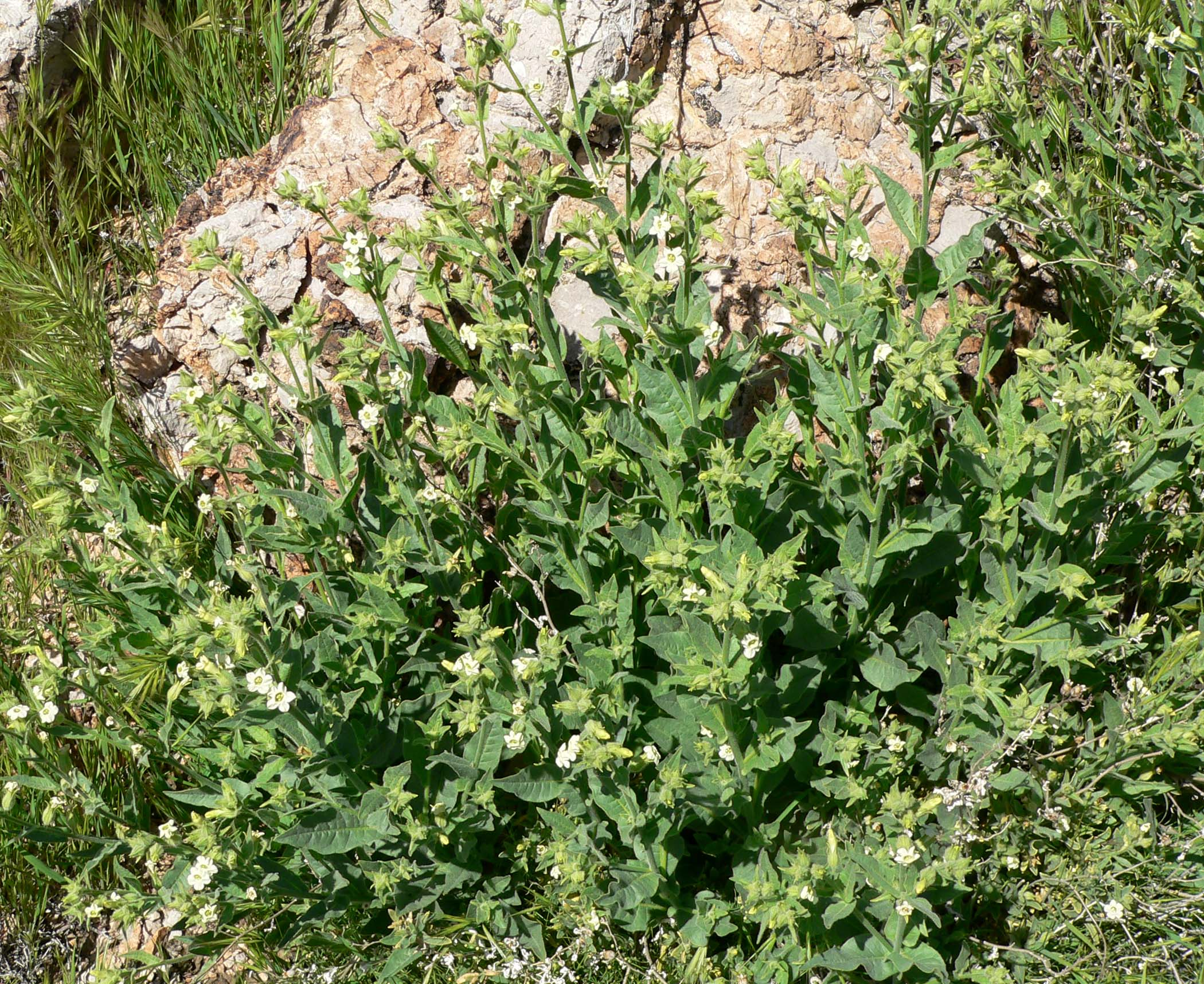

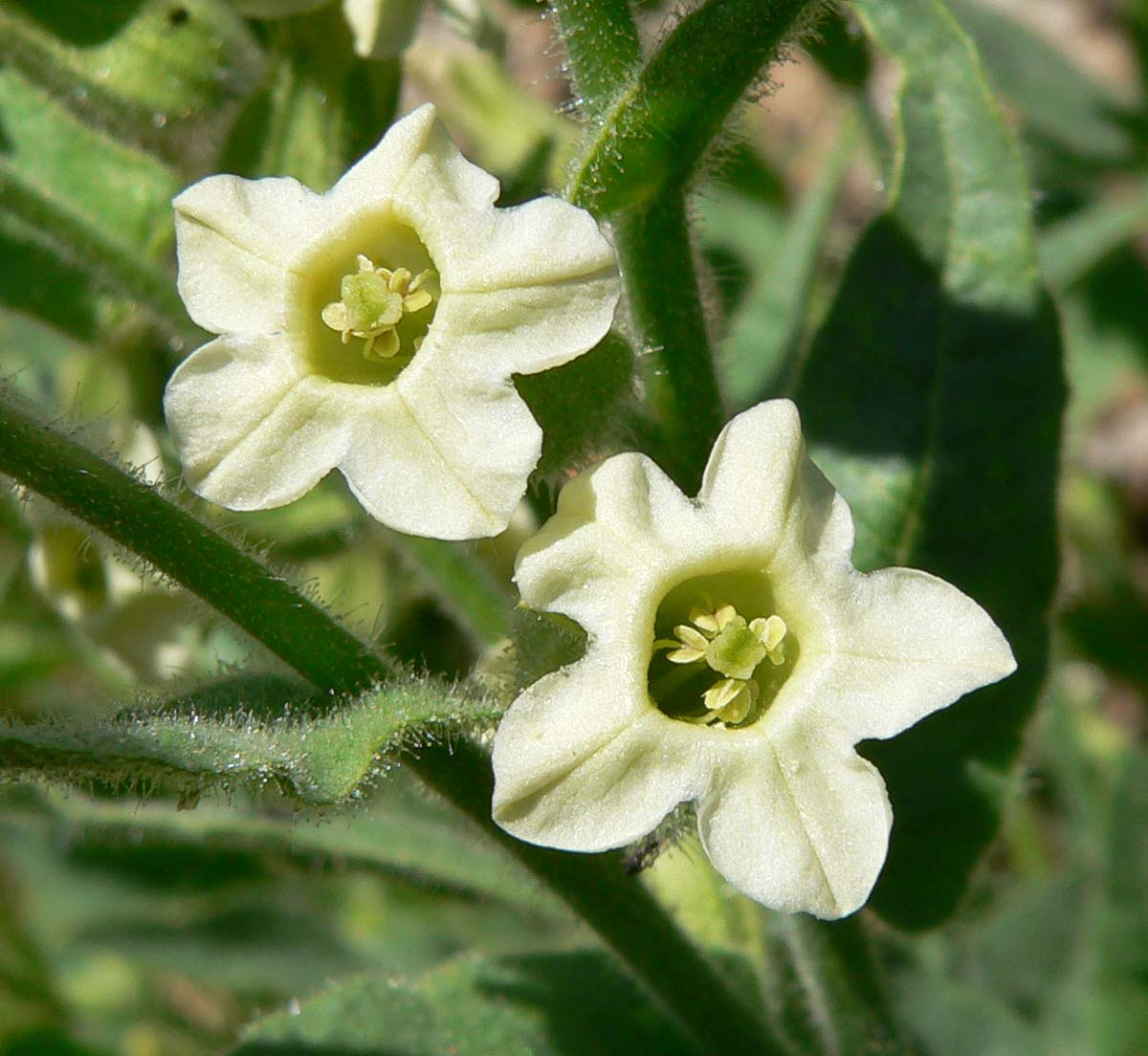

== Penstemon parryi ==
- Common name: Parry's penstemon
- Flowers bloom February to April
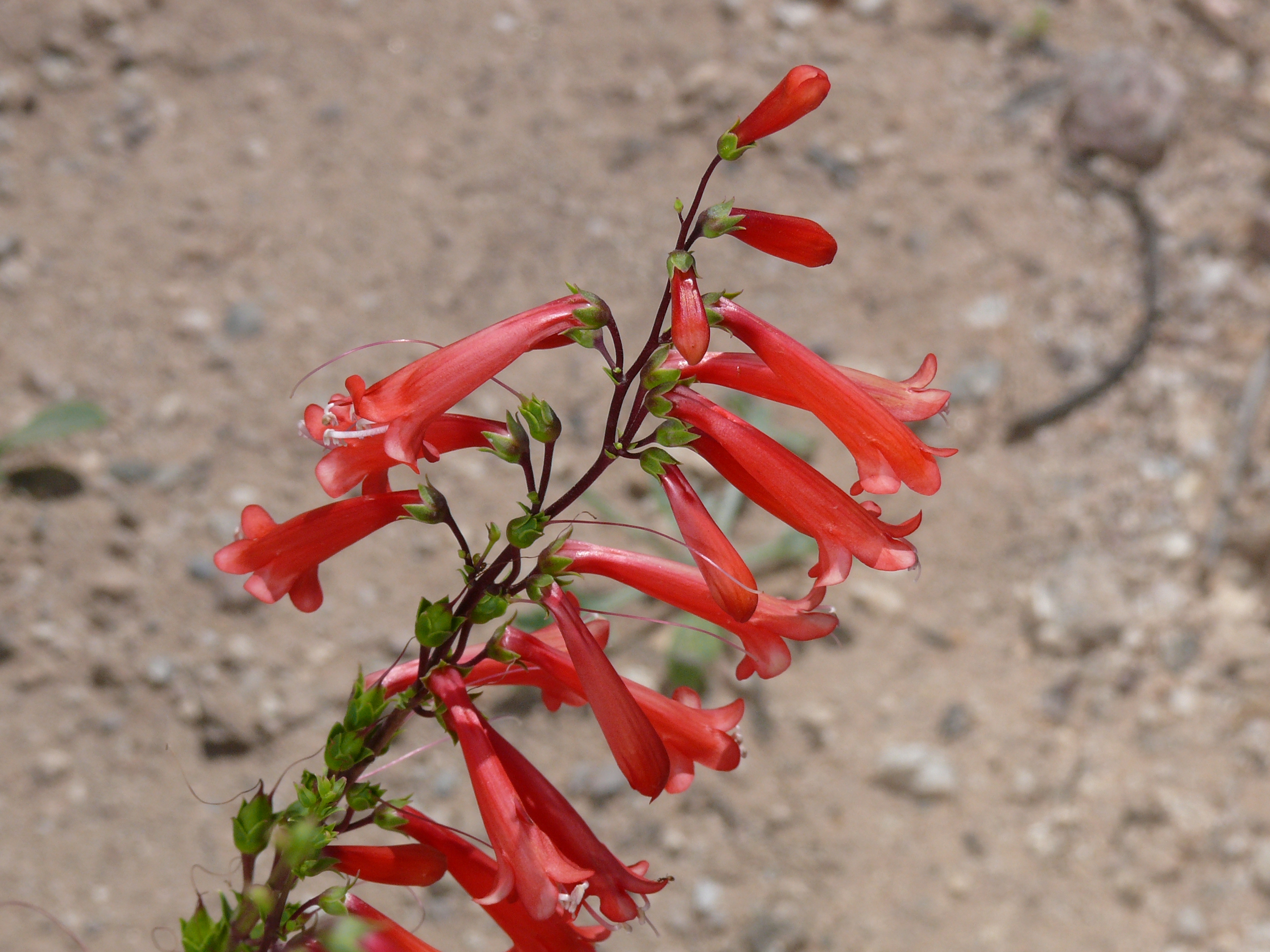

== Physaria purpurea ==
- Common name: rose bladderpod
- Flowers bloom January to May

== Proboscidea parviflora ==
- Common name: doubleclaw

== Rafinesquia neomexicana ==
- Common name: desert chicory, New Mexico plumeseed
- Flowers bloom mid-February to May
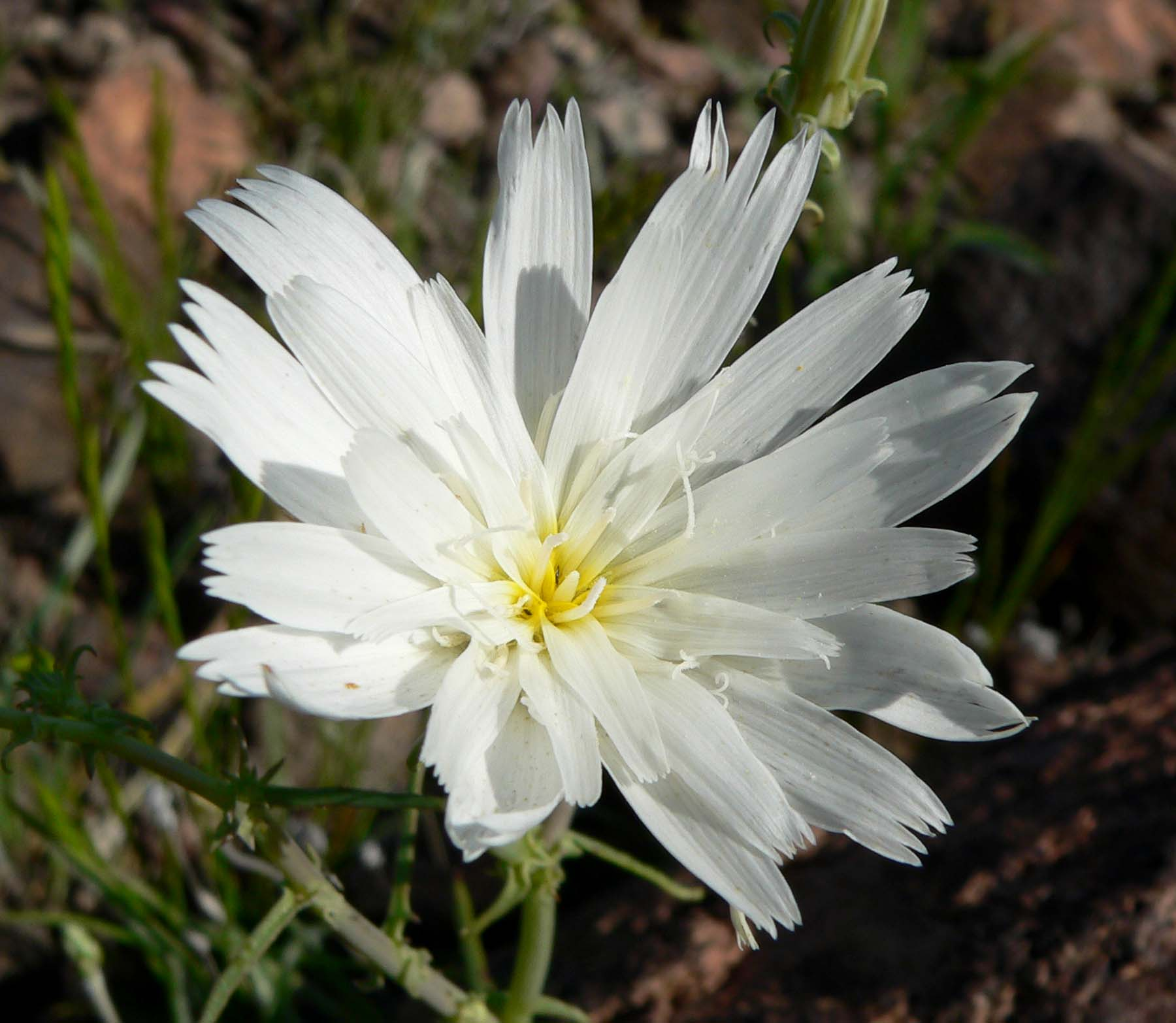

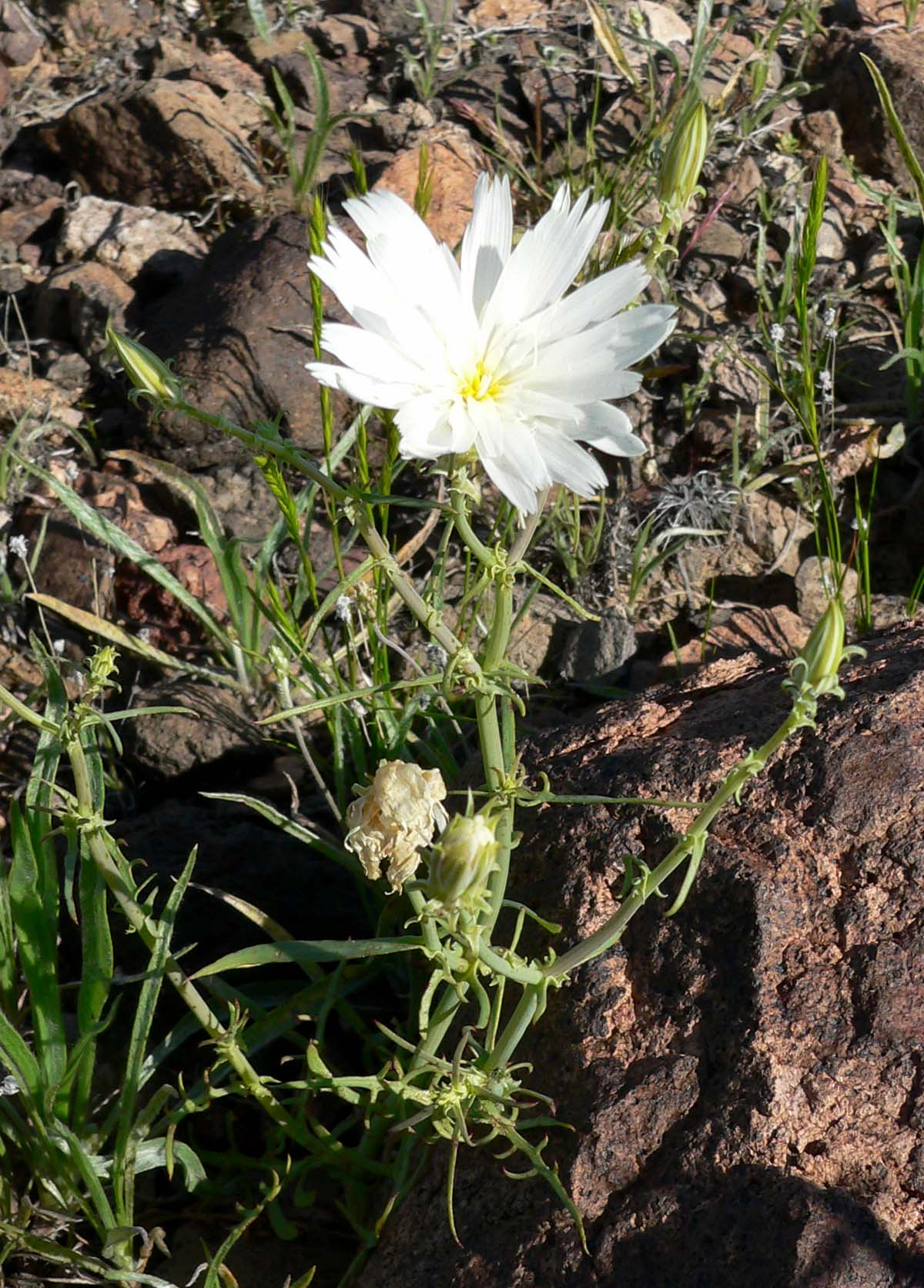

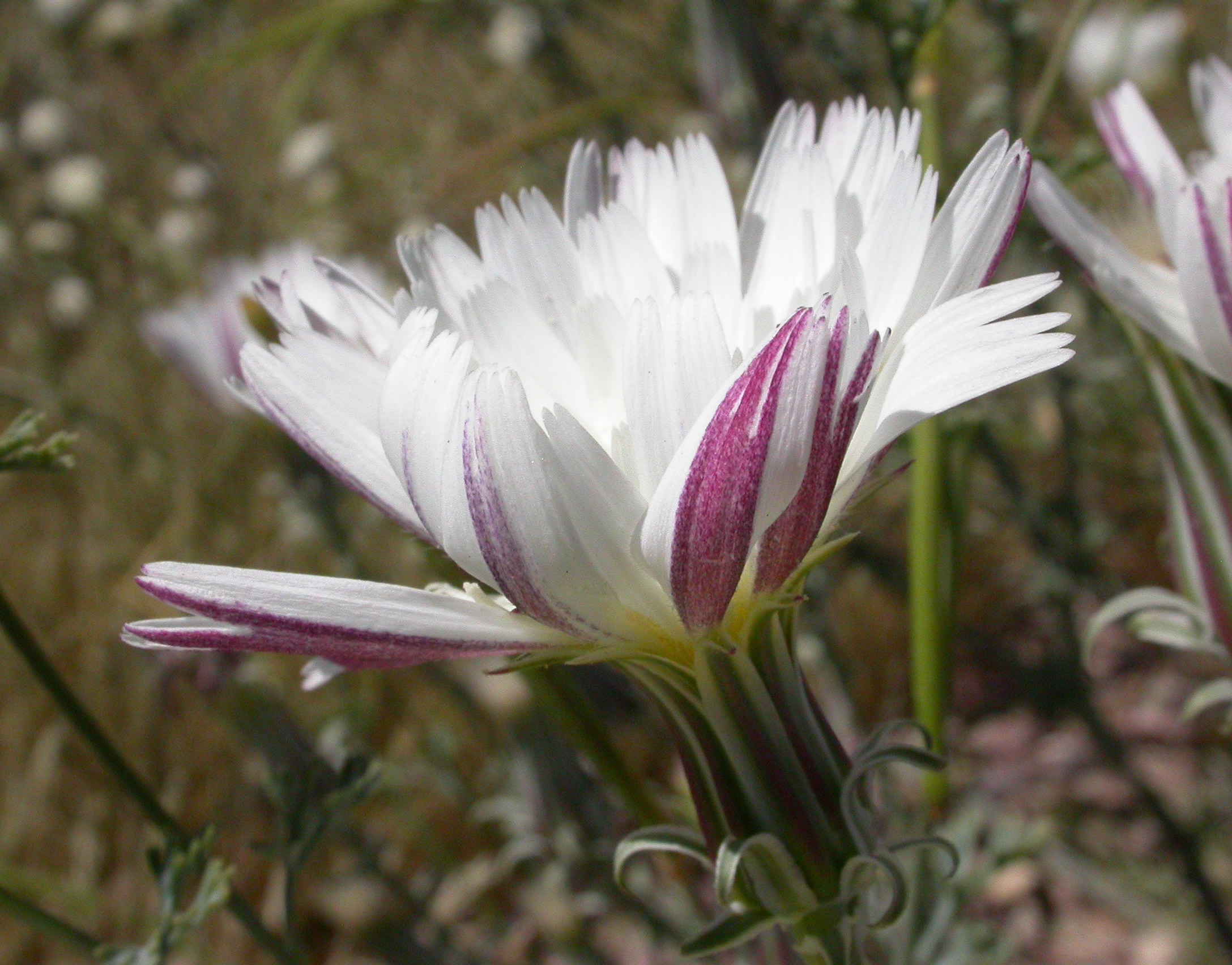

== Salvia columbariae ==
- Common name: chia
- Flowers bloom March–May
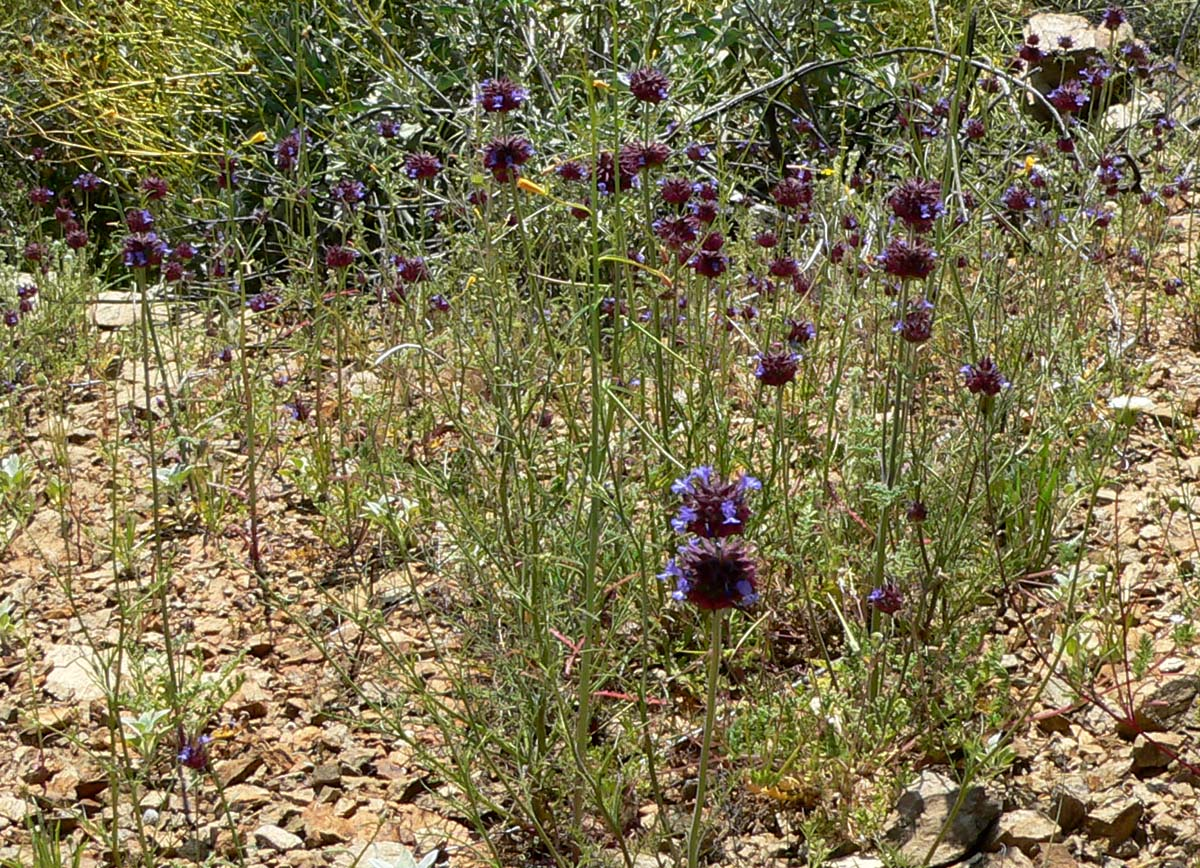

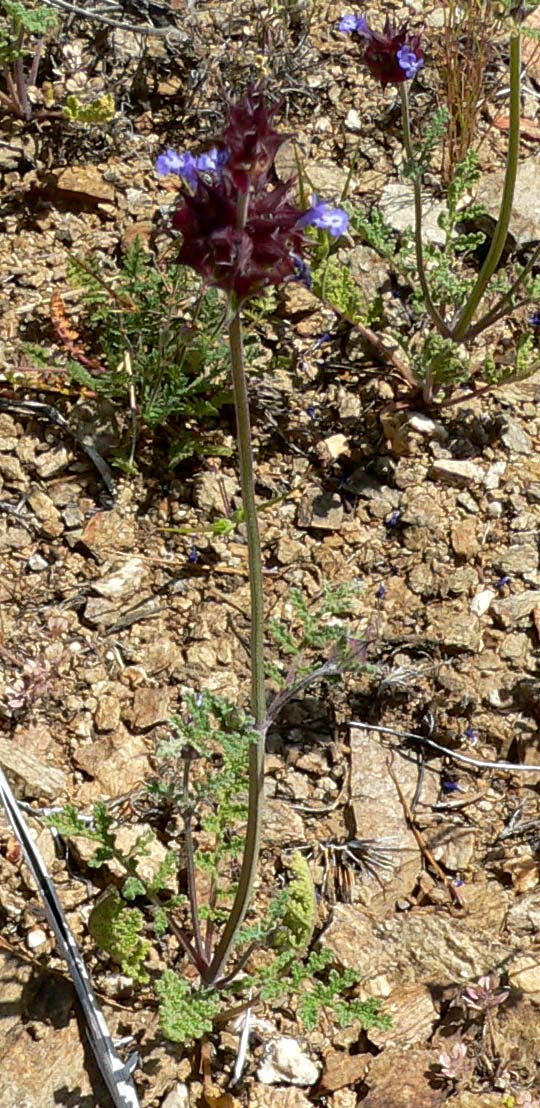

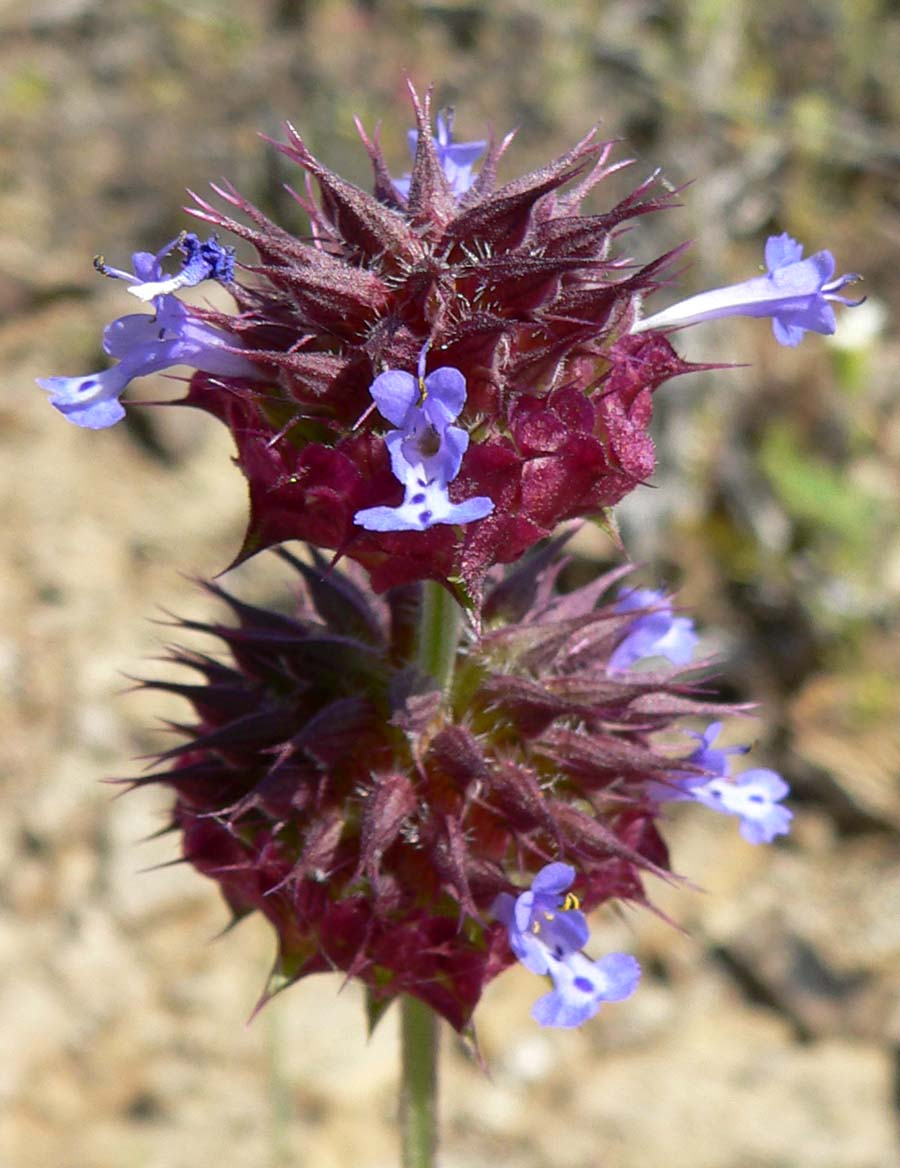

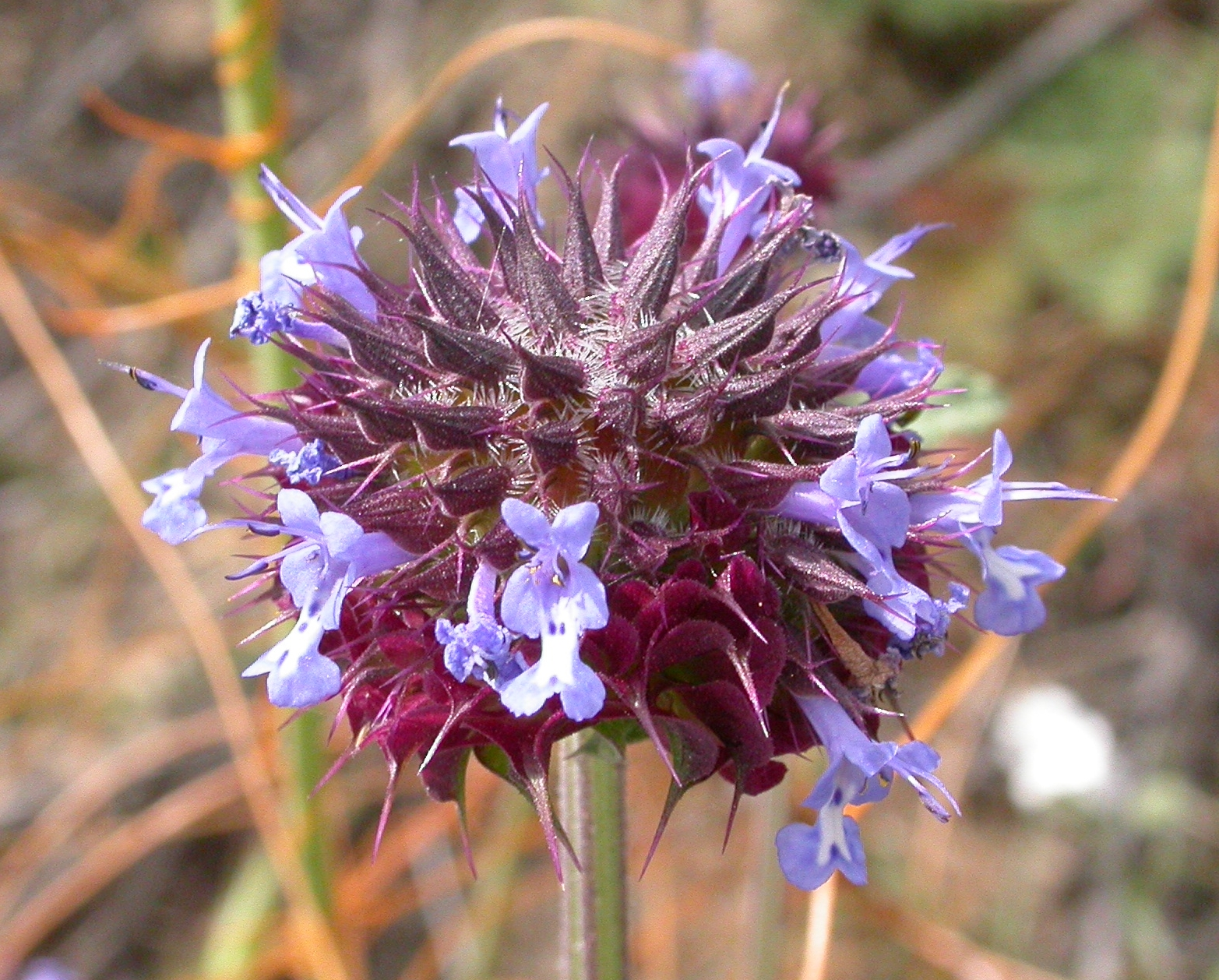

== Senna covesii ==
- Common name: Coues' senna
- Flowers bloom in spring and fall
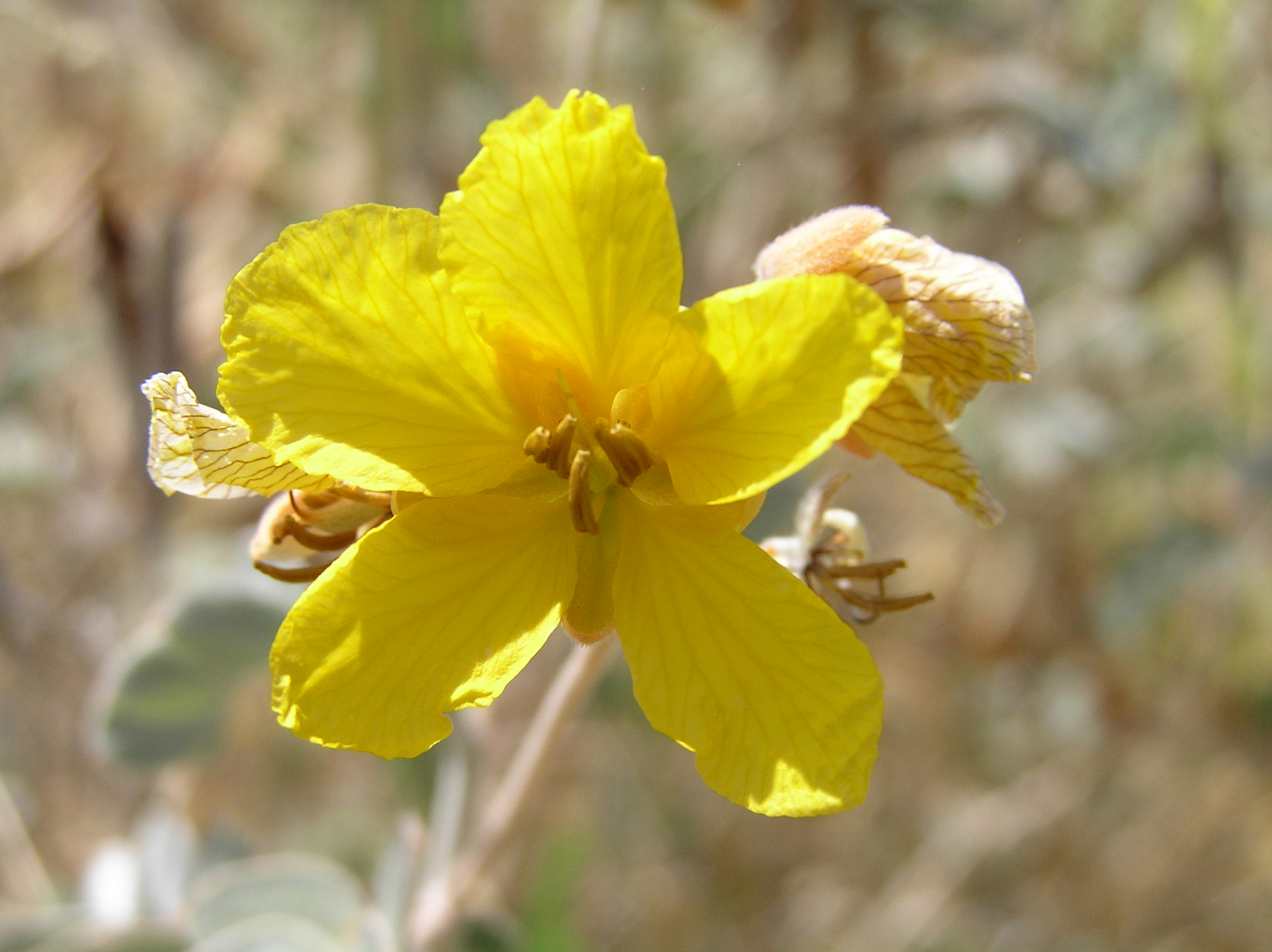

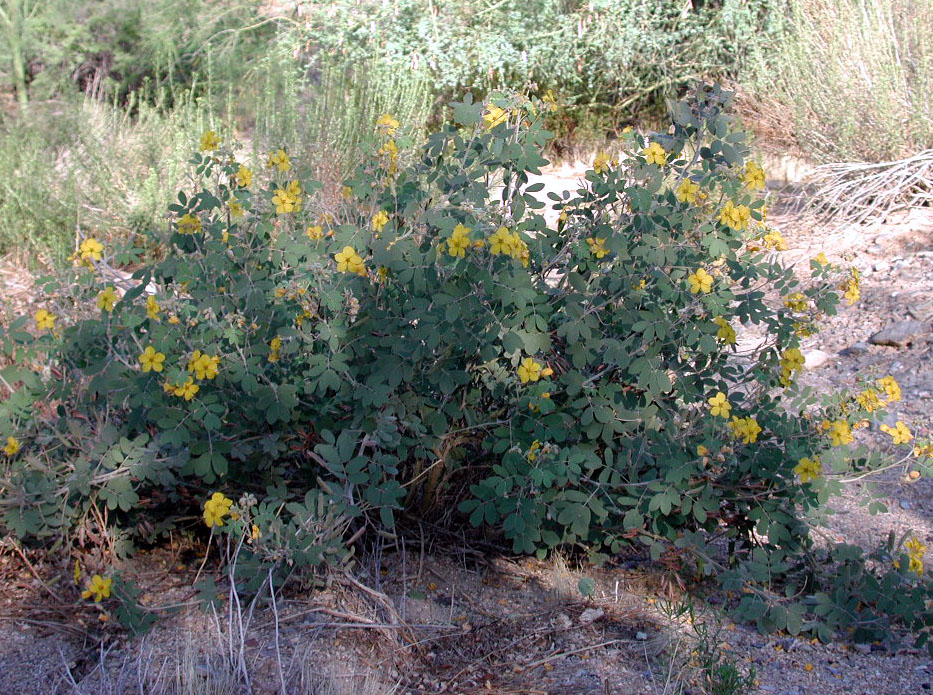

== Senna wislizeni ==
- Common name: Wislizenus' senna, shrubby senna
- Flowers bloom in the mid to late summer

== Silene antirrhina ==
- Common name: sleepy catchfly, sleepy silene
- Flowers bloom March to August

== Sphaeralcea ambigua ==
- Common name: desert globemallow, apricot mallow
- Flowers bloom in the spring
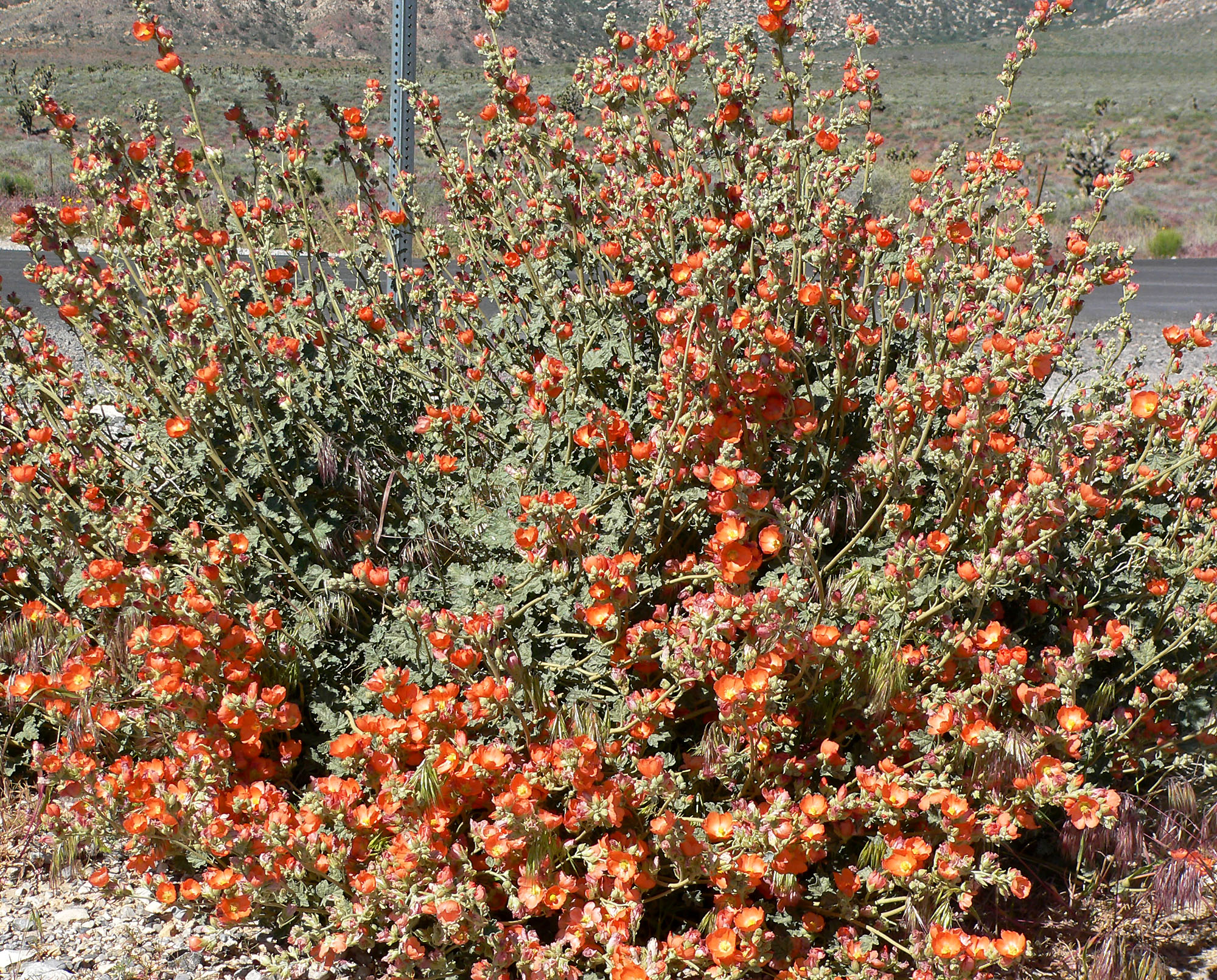

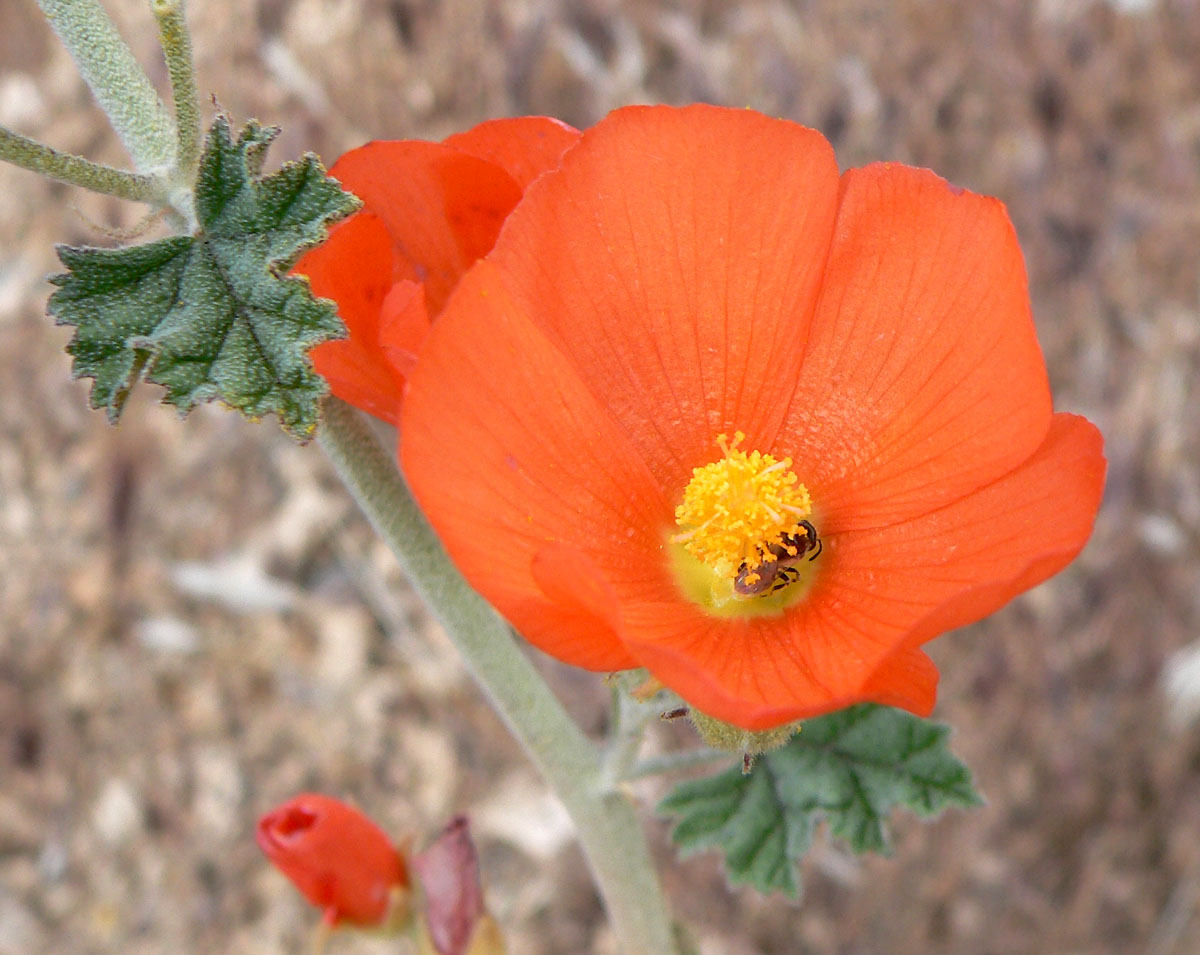

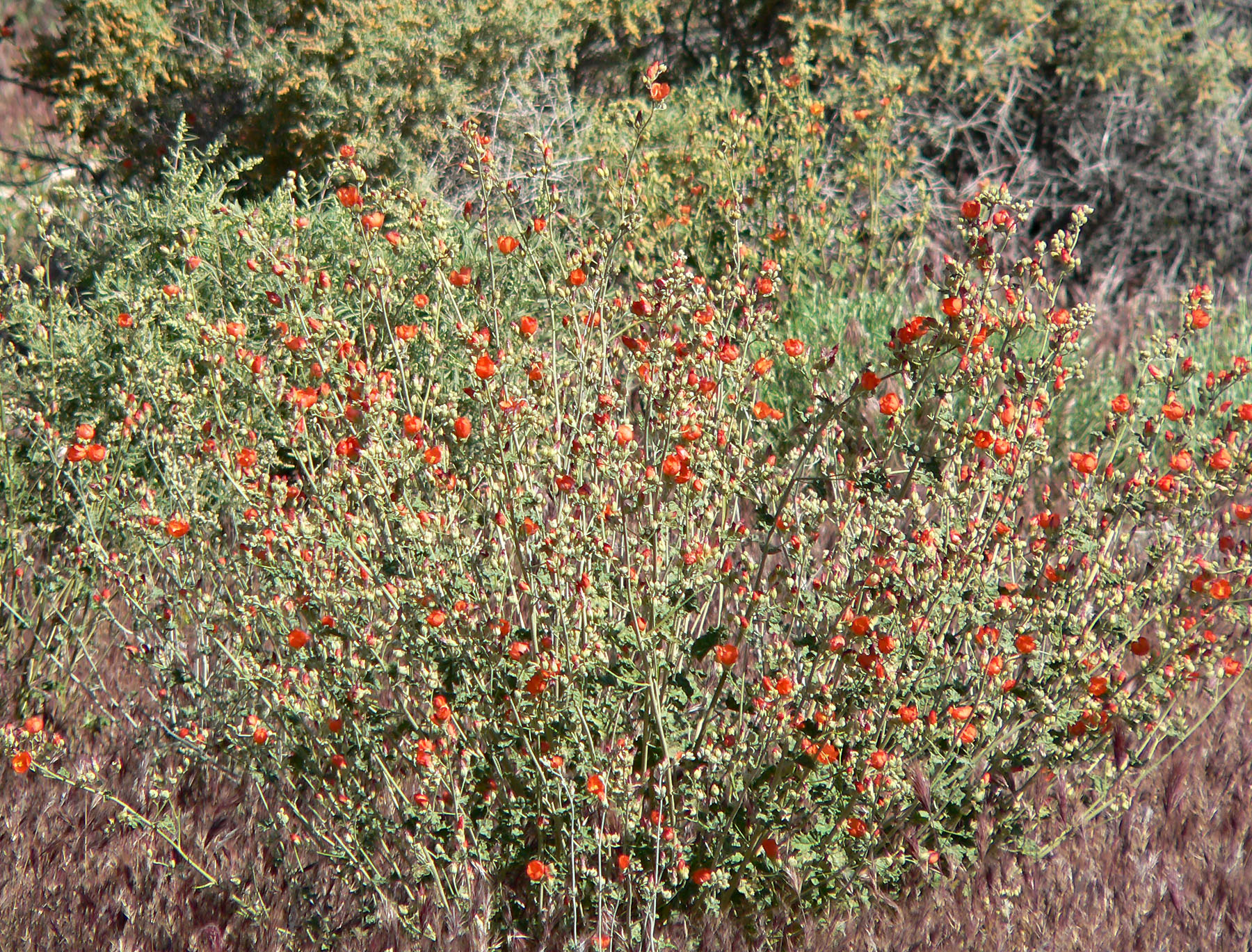

== Trixis californica ==
- Common name: American threefold
- Flowers after rains, most commonly in the spring
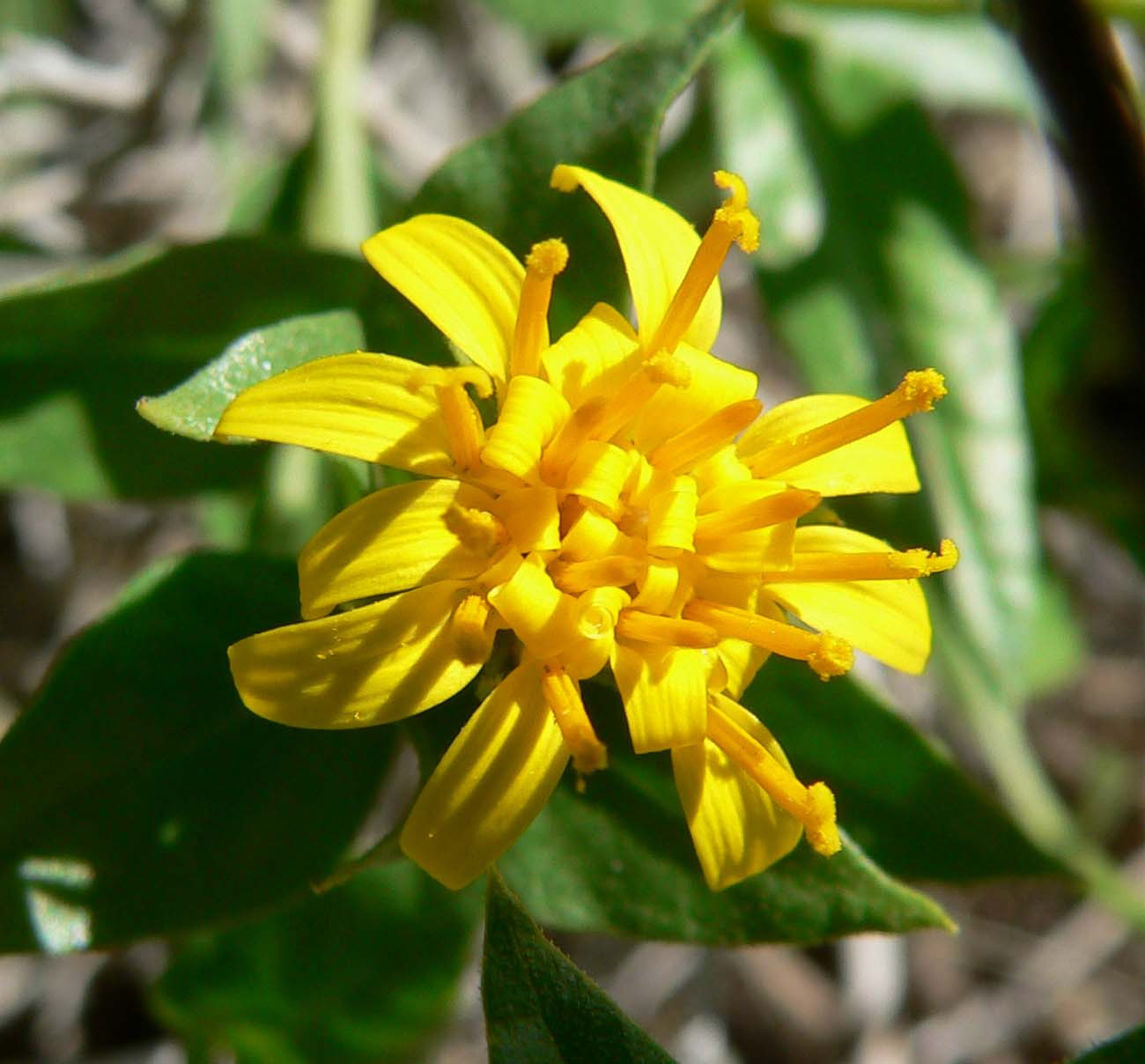

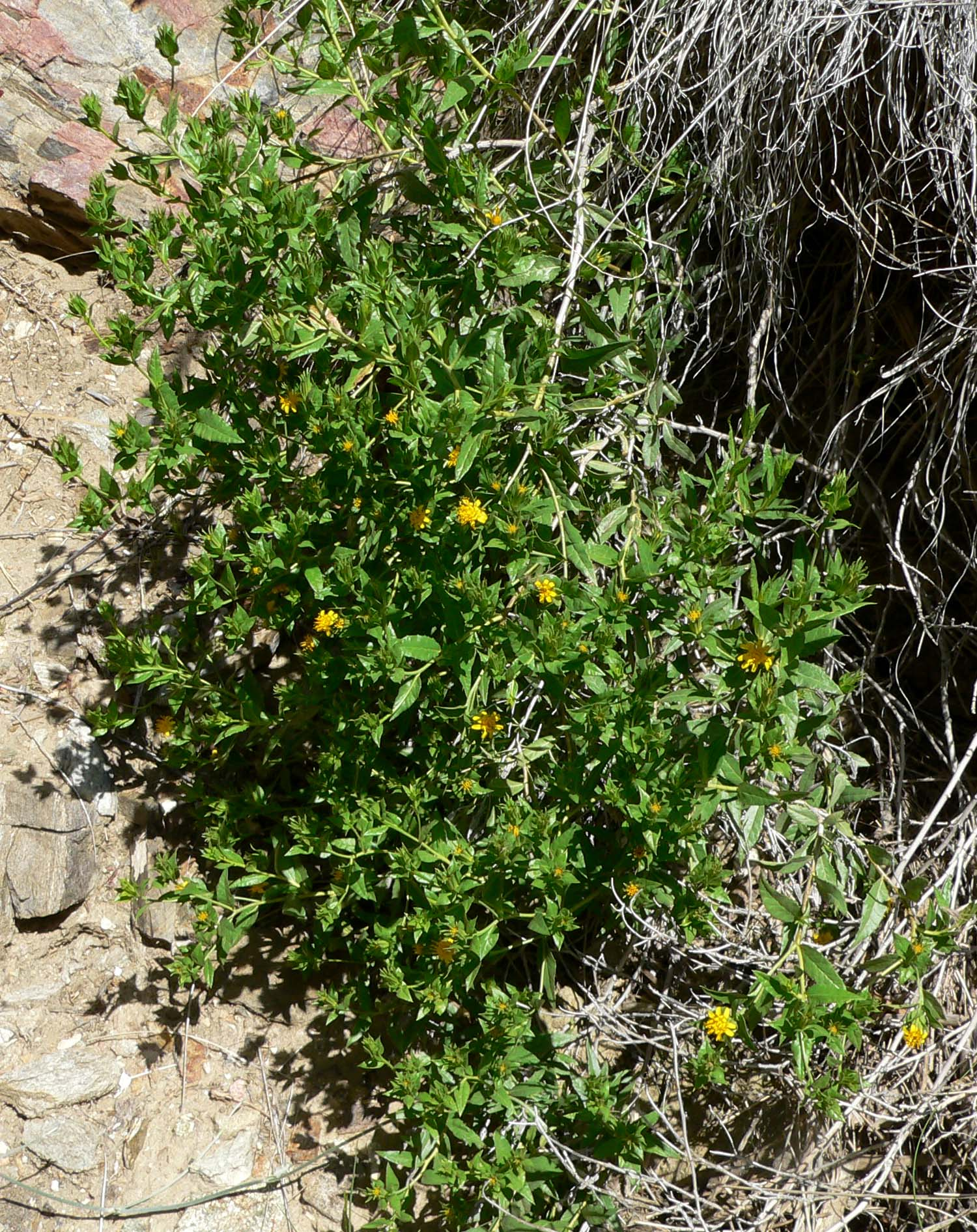

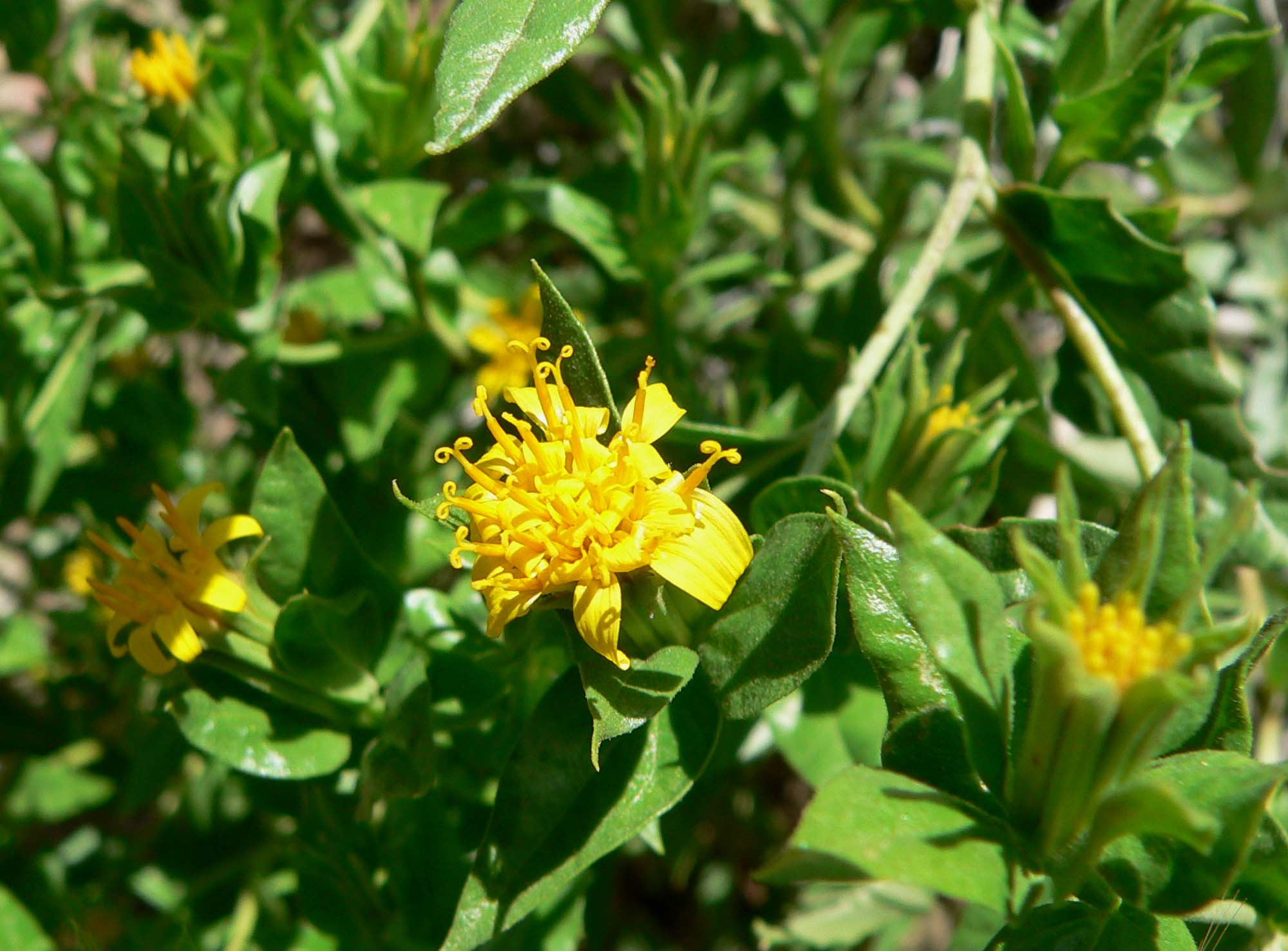

== Zeltnera calycosa ==
- Common name: Arizona centaury
- Flowers bloom April to June
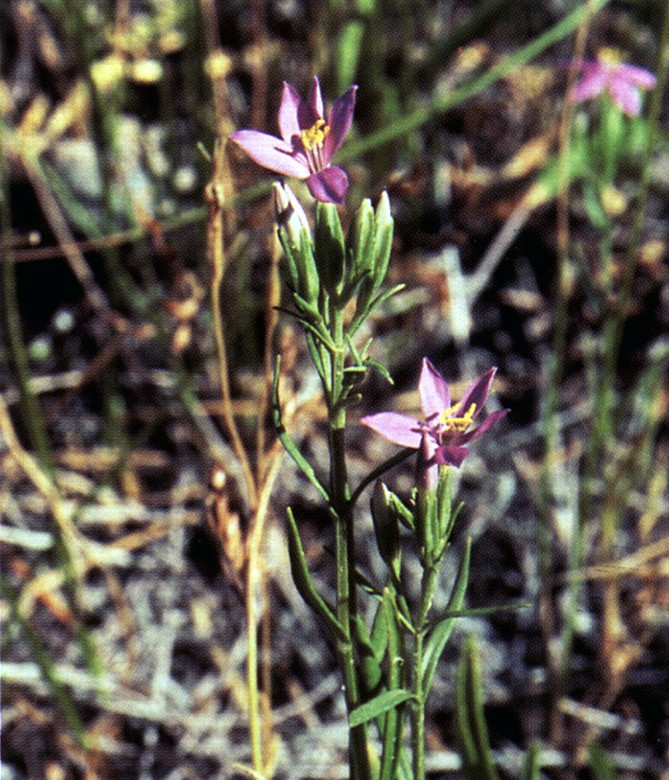

== See also ==
- List of flora of the Sonoran Desert Region by common name
- Index: Flora of the Sonoran Deserts
- List of southern LCRV flora by region — Lower Colorado River Valley.
