= Flora of Chile =

Plants in Chile

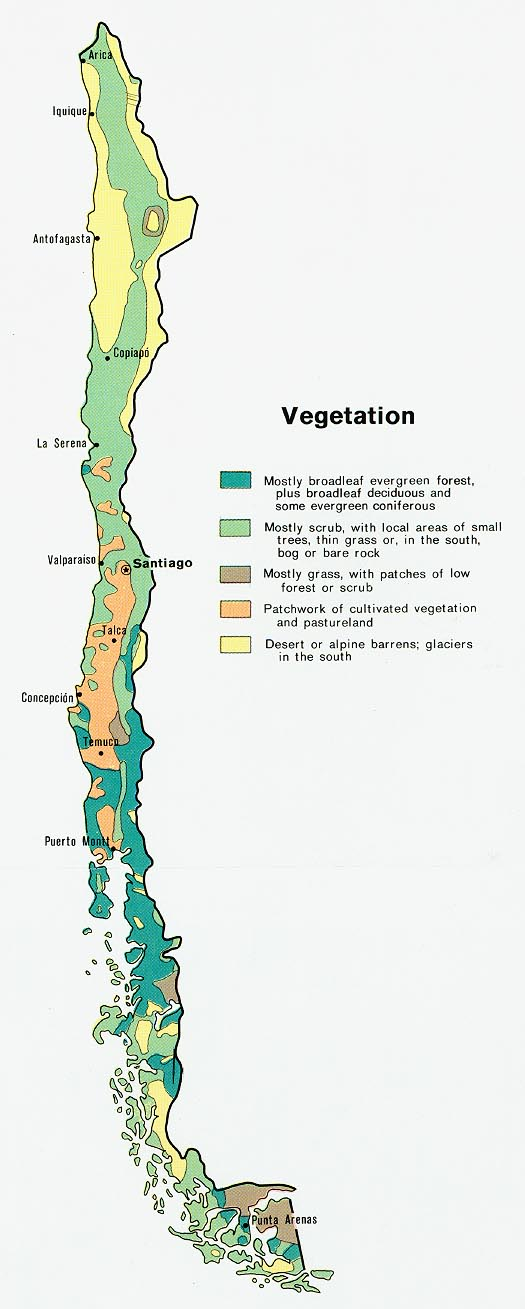
Vegetation map of Chile

The native flora of Chile is characterized by a higher degree of endemism and relatively fewer species compared to the flora of other countries of South America. A classification of this flora necessitates its division into at least three general zones: the desert provinces of the north, Central Chile, and the humid regions of the south.

== Northern Chile ==
The first is an arid desert(Atacama desert) absolutely barren along part of the coast, between Arica and Copiapó, but with a coarse scanty vegetation near the Cordilleras along watercourses and on the slopes where moisture from the melting snows above percolates through the sand.

The altiplano of the northernmost portion of the Chilean territory is home to the Browningia candelaris, a candelabrum-shaped cactus. Another cactus species, the Echinopsis atacamensis, grows in the pre-Andean area. The high Andean region is also characterized by the presence of species of the genus Polylepis and the Azorella compacta. Cacti occur in the coastal desert. Here, the most common species are those of the genus Copiapoa, which are recognizable by their distinctive shapes.

An endemic tree of the Norte Grande is the Prosopis tamarugo. It grows mainly in the Pampa del Tamarugal. South of Loa River and west of Cordillera Domeyko, the Atacama Desert is completely destitute of vegetation.

In the valleys of the Copiapó and Huasco rivers a meagre vegetation is to be found near their channels, apart from what is produced by irrigation, but the surface of the plateau and the dry. River channels below the sierras are completely barren. Continuing southward into the Coquimbo Region a gradual change in the arid conditions may be observed. The higher summits of the Andes afford a larger and more continuous supply of water, and so dependent are the people in the cultivated river valleys on this source of water supply that they watch for snowstorms in the Cordilleras as an indication of what the coming season is to be. The arborescent growth near the mountains is larger and more vigorous, in which are to be found the "algarrobo" (Prosopis chilensis) and "chañar" (Geoffroea decorticans), but the only shrub to be found on the coast is a species of Skytanthus.

Proceeding southward cacti become common, first a dwarfed species, and then a larger columnar form (Echinopsis chiloensis). The streams are fringed with willows; fruit trees and alfalfa fields fill the irrigated valleys, and the lower mountain slopes are better covered with a thorny arborescent growth. The divides between the streams, however, continue barren as far south as the transverse ranges of mountains across the province of Aconcagua.

== Central Chile ==
To some degree the flora of central Chile is of a transition character between the northern and southern zones. It is much more than this, however, for it has a large number of genera and species peculiarly its own. This zone, with the Chilean Matorral, extends from about the 30th to the 36th parallel, perhaps a little farther south to include some characteristic types. The evergreens largely predominate here as well as in the extreme south, and on the open, sunburnt plains the vegetation takes on a sub-tropical aspect. One of the most characteristic trees of this zone is the peumo (Cryptocarya alba), whose dense evergreen foliage is everywhere conspicuous. The quillay (Quillaja saponaria) is another characteristic evergreen tree of this region, whose bark possesses saponaceous properties. In earlier times the coquito palm (Jubaea chilensis) was to be found throughout this part of Chile, but it is almost completely extinct due to the destructive extraction process of its sweet sap, from which a syrup is made. Through the central zone the plains are open and there are forests on the mountain slopes.

== Southern Chile ==
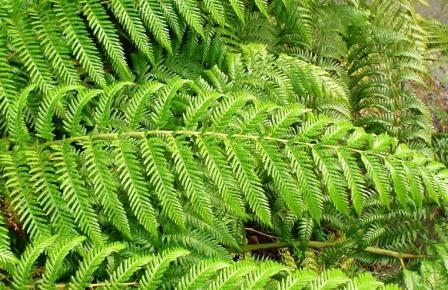
Lophosoria quadripinnata fern common in Valdivian temperate rainforests as well as in Juan Fernández Archipelago

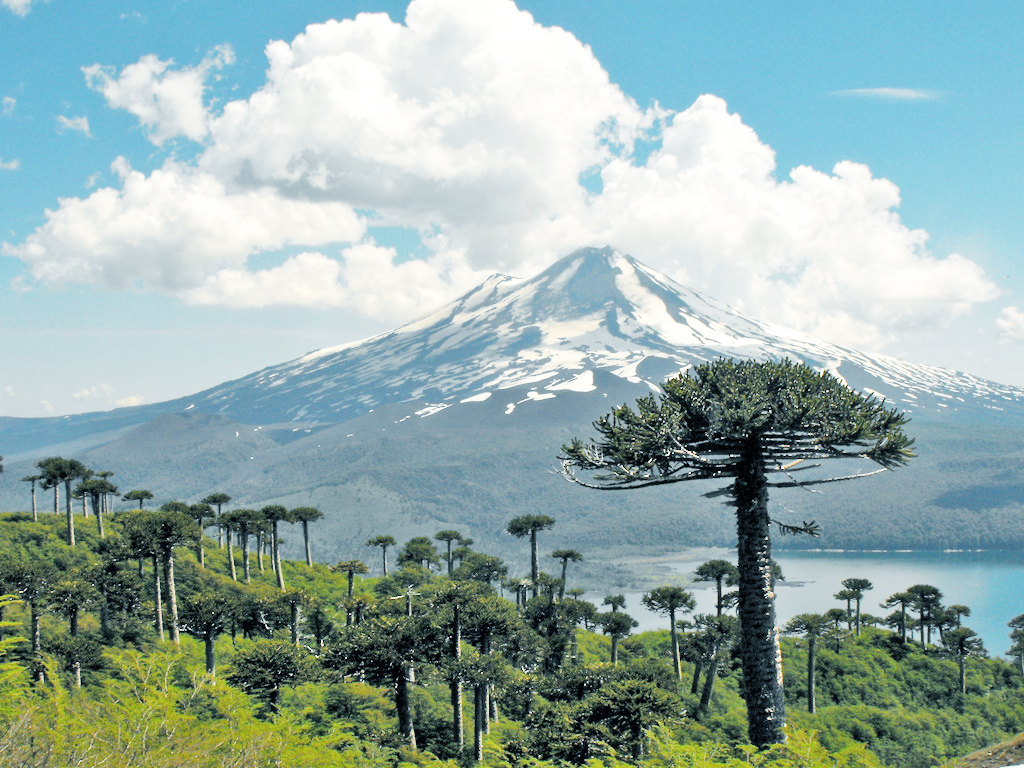
Araucaria araucana trees in Conguillío National Park

One of the most striking forest trees is the pehuén or Chilean pine (Araucaria araucana), which often grows to a height of 100 ft. and is prized by the natives for its fruit. Three native species of the genus Nothofagus: the roble (Nothofagus obliqua), coihue (Nothofagus dombeyi), and raulí (Nothofagus alpina)--are widely diffused and highly prized for their wood, especially the first, which is misleadingly called roble (oak).

Chile's thickest forest are found between the Bío-Bío River and the Taitao Peninsula. Among those trees are the alerce (Fitzroya cupressoides), the ciprés de las Guaitecas (Pilgerodendron uviferum), the Chilean cypress (Austrocedrus chilensis), lingue (Persea lingue), laurel (Laurelia sempervirens), avellano (Gevuina avellana), luma (Luma apiculata), and many others.

In the southern zone there are no plains, with the exception of small areas near the Strait of Magellan, and the forests are universal. In the variety, size and density of their growth these forests remind one of the tropics. They are made up, in great part, of the evergreen beech (Nothofagus betuloides), the deciduous antarctic beech (Nothofagus antarctica) and Winter's bark (Drimys winteri), intermingled with a dense undergrowth composed of a great variety of shrubs and plants, among which are Maytenus magellanica, Gaultheria mucronata, Berberis buxifolia, wild currant (Ribes magellanicum), a trailing blackberry, tree ferns, reed-like grasses and innumerable parasites (including species of the genus Misodendron). On the eastern side of the Cordillera, in the extreme south, the climate is drier and open, and grassy plains are found, but on the western side the dripping forests extend from an altitude of 1000 to 1500 ft. down to the level of the sea. A peculiar vegetable product of this inclement region is a small globular fungus growing on the bark of the beech, which is a staple article of food among the Fuegians—probably the only instance where a fungus is the bread of a people.

== See also ==
- Central Andean dry puna
- Chilean Matorral
- Magellanic subpolar forests
- Magellanic moorland
- Valdivian temperate rain forests
