= Crioceras =

Crioceras is the scientific name for two genera of organisms and may refer to:

- Crioceras (cephalopod), a prehistoric genus of ammonites in the family Crioceratidae
- Crioceras (plant), a genus of plants in the family Apocynaceae
