= Cameraria =

Cameraria may refer to:

- Cameraria (moth), a genus of leaf-mining moths
- Cameraria (plant), a genus of plants in the dogbane family
