= Geissolosimine =

Names
- IUPAC name (1R,12S,14S)-14-ethyl-9-[(14S,15E)-15-ethylidene-3,17-diazapentacyclo[12.3.1.0^{2,10}.0^{4,9}.0^{12,17}]octadeca-2(10),4,6,8-tetraen-13-yl]-10-oxa-8,16-diazahexacyclo[11.5.2.11,8.0^{2,7}.0^{16,19}.0^{12,21}]henicosa-2,4,6-triene

Identifiers
CAS Number	7096-95-9
3D model (JSmol)	Interactive image
ChEBI	CHEBI:141903
ChEMBL	ChEMBL4062854
ChemSpider	34532525
PubChem CID	71594126
CompTox Dashboard (EPA)	DTXSID501336055
- InChI: InChI=1S/C38H44N4O/c1-3-21-18-40-14-13-38-28-10-6-8-12-30(28)42-36(38)27(24(21)17-33(38)40)20-43-37(42)34-25-15-32-35-26(23-9-5-7-11-29(23)39-35)16-31(34)41(32)19-22(25)4-2/h4-12,21,24-25,27,31-34,36-37,39H,3,13-20H2,1-2H3/b22-4-/t21-,24?,25-,27+,31?,32?,33?,34?,36?,37?,38-/m1/s1 Key: CSVWQRLFFUNUND-KJSNTNJZSA-N
- SMILES: CC[C@@H]1CN2CC[C@@]34C2CC1[C@H]5C3N(C(OC5)C6[C@@H]\7CC8C9=C(CC6N8C/C7=C/C)C1=CC=CC=C1N9)C1=CC=CC=C41

Related compounds
Related compounds	Divaricine
- Except where otherwise noted, data are given for materials in their standard state (at 25 °C [77 °F], 100 kPa). Infobox references

Geissolosimine is an antiplasmodial indole alkaloid isolated from the bark of Geissospermum vellosii.
