= Haplophyton =

Scientific classification
- Kingdom: Plantae
- Clade: Tracheophytes
- Clade: Angiosperms
- Clade: Eudicots
- Clade: Asterids
- Order: Gentianales
- Family: Apocynaceae
- Subfamily: Rauvolfioideae
- Tribe: Aspidospermateae
- Genus: Haplophyton; A.DC

Genus of plants

Haplophyton is a genus of plants in the family Apocynaceae, first described in 1844. It is native to the southwestern United States, Mexico, Cuba, and Guatemala. It is a suffrutescent herb with alternative leaves and showy colorful flowers.

The common name cockroach plant (or hierba de la cucaracha) is in reference to its insecticidal properties. It has been used to kill cockroaches, fleas, flies, lice, and mosquitoes. Leaf extracts and sap contain many insecticidal compounds — such as the indole alkaloid aspidophytine.

== Species ==
Some authors accept three species in the genus, others recognize two, considering H. cinereum synonymous with H. cimicidum. The World Checklist recognizes:

- Haplophyton cimicidum A.DC. (syn H. cinereum (A.Rich.) Woodson) - Michoacán, Puebla, Morelos, Oaxaca, Chiapas, Guatemala; naturalized in Cuba
- Haplophyton crooksii (L.D.Benson) L.D.Benson - S Arizona, SW New Mexico, W Texas, Sonora, Chihuahua, Coahuila, Cuba
