= Molongum =

Scientific classification
- Kingdom: Plantae
- Clade: Tracheophytes
- Clade: Angiosperms
- Clade: Eudicots
- Clade: Asterids
- Order: Gentianales
- Family: Apocynaceae
- Subfamily: Rauvolfioideae
- Tribe: Tabernaemontaneae
- Subtribe: Ambelaniinae
- Genus: Molongum; Pichon

Genus of plants

Molongum is a genus of plant in the family Apocynaceae first described as a genus in 1948. It is native to South America.

Species

- Molongum laxum (Benth.) Pichon - Colombia, Venezuela, NW Brazil
- Molongum lucidum (Kunth) Zarucchi - Colombia, Venezuela, NW Brazil
- Molongum zschokkeiforme (Markgr.) Pichon - NW Brazil

formerly included

- Molongum macrophyllum (Müll.Arg.) Pichon = Spongiosperma macrophyllum (Müll.Arg.) Zarucchi
