= C21H26N2O2 =

The molecular formula C_{21}H_{26}N_{2}O_{2} (molar mass: 338.44 g/mol) may refer to:

- Coronaridine, or 18-carbomethoxyibogamine
- Kopsinine
