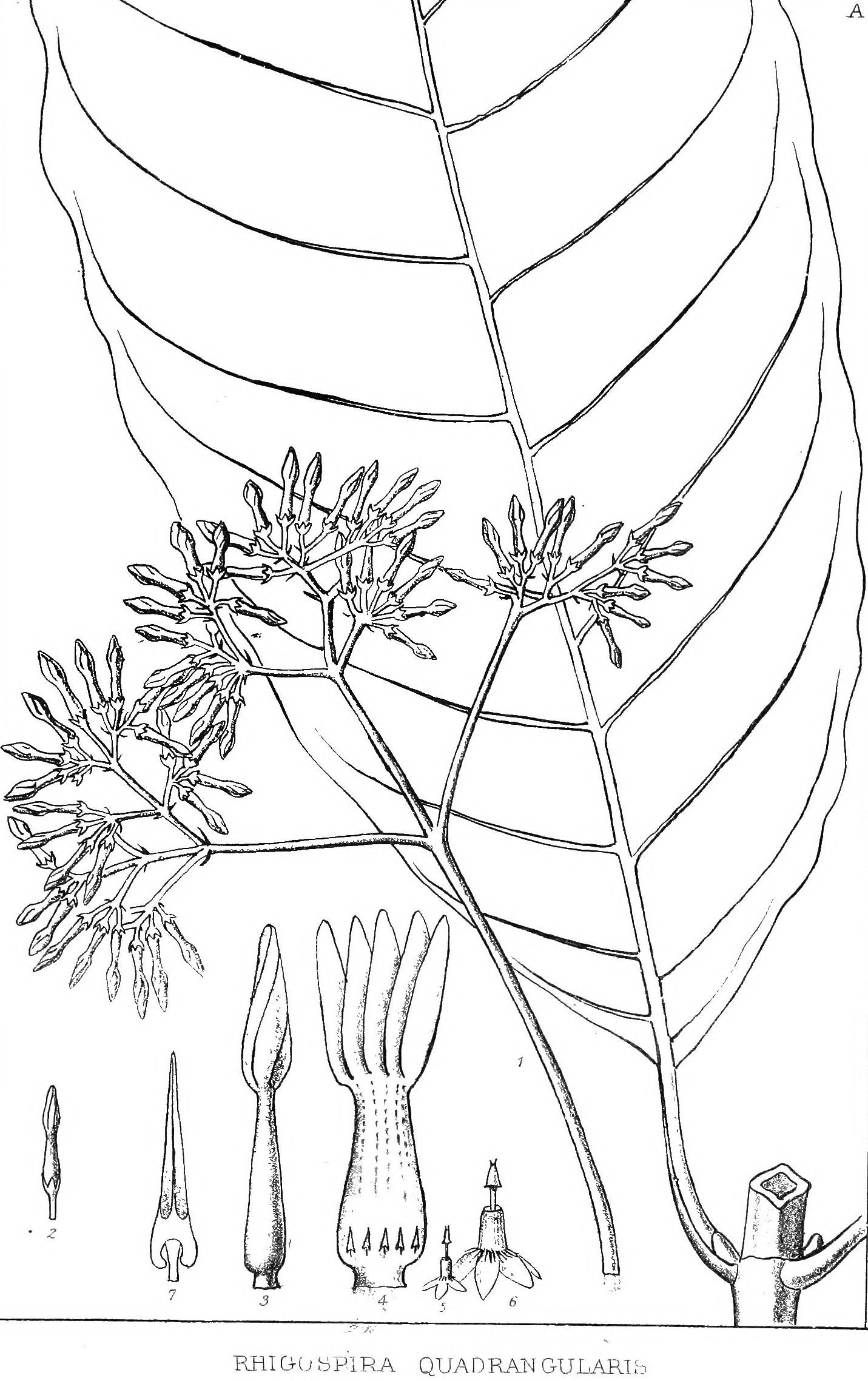
- A. Rhigospira quadrangularis, portion of a plant. Fig. 1, the inflorescence. Fig. 2, a flower: both natural size. Fig. 3, the corolla in bud, showing the pyramidal form of the erect segments in aestivation. Fig. 4, the same cut open when expanded, showing their simple sinistrorse convolution and the nearly basal position of the stamens: both magnified. Fig. 5, the calyx, disk, very short style, clavuncle, and stigmata, natural size. Fig.6, the same, magnified. Fig. 7, a stamen, much magnified.

Conservation status
- Least Concern (IUCN 3.1)

Scientific classification
- Kingdom: Plantae
- Clade: Tracheophytes
- Clade: Angiosperms
- Clade: Eudicots
- Clade: Asterids
- Order: Gentianales
- Family: Apocynaceae
- Subfamily: Rauvolfioideae
- Tribe: Tabernaemontaneae
- Subtribe: Ambelaniinae
- Genus: Rhigospira; Miers
- Species: R. quadrangularis

Binomial name
- Rhigospira quadrangularis (Müll.Arg.) Miers

Synonyms
- Ambelania quadrangularis Müll.Arg.; Hancornia macrophylla Spruce ex Müll.Arg.

= Rhigospira =

Genus of plants

Rhigospira is a genus of flowering plants in the family Apocynaceae, first described as a genus in 1878 by John Miers. The species, Rhigospira quadrangularis was first described as Ambelania quadrangularis by Johannes Müller Argoviensis in 1860 but was transferred to the genus, Rhigospira, in 1878 by John Miers. The genus contains only one known species, Rhigospira quadrangularis, native to northwestern South America (Colombia, Venezuela, Peru, NW Brazil).

formerly placed in the genus

- Rhigospira paucifolia (Müll.Arg.) Miers = Macoubea guianensis Aubl.
- Rhigospira reticulata (A.DC.) Miers = Macoubea guianensis Aubl.
- Rhigospira sinuosa Miers = Macoubea guianensis Aubl.
- Rhigospira sprucei (Müll.Arg.) Miers = Macoubea sprucei (Müll.Arg.) Markgr.
- Rhigospira ternstroemiacea (Müll.Arg.) Miers = Neocouma ternstroemiacea (Müll.Arg.) Pierre
- Rhigospira venulosa Miers = Spongiosperma macrophyllum (Müll.Arg.) Zarucchi
