= Chilocarpus conspicuus =

Scientific classification
- Kingdom: Plantae
- Clade: Tracheophytes
- Clade: Angiosperms
- Clade: Eudicots
- Clade: Asterids
- Order: Gentianales
- Family: Apocynaceae
- Genus: Chilocarpus
- Species: C. conspicuus

Binomial name
- Chilocarpus conspicuus (Steenis) Markgr.

Species of plant

Chilocarpus conspicuus is a plant in the genus Chilocarpus, in the family Apocynaceae. It is native to Borneo. The only information known about this species is from a collection from Mt Kinabalu, Brunei and two collections from Sarawak. There are several similar species that are alike in flower and without examining the distinctive fruit of this species, a specimen may be mistaken for Chilocarpus denudatus. It is an accepted species, first described by Steenis and originally published in Blumea 19: 162 1971.

It is large woody climber which grows up to 15 metres tall. Its branchlets are glabrous. Its leaves are described as: "Inflorescence terminal and axillary in the axils of upper leaves, 3.5-7 cm long; Stamens inserted at 2.3-2.5 mm from corolla base which is 0.5-0.6 of tube length." It has moniliform fruit.
