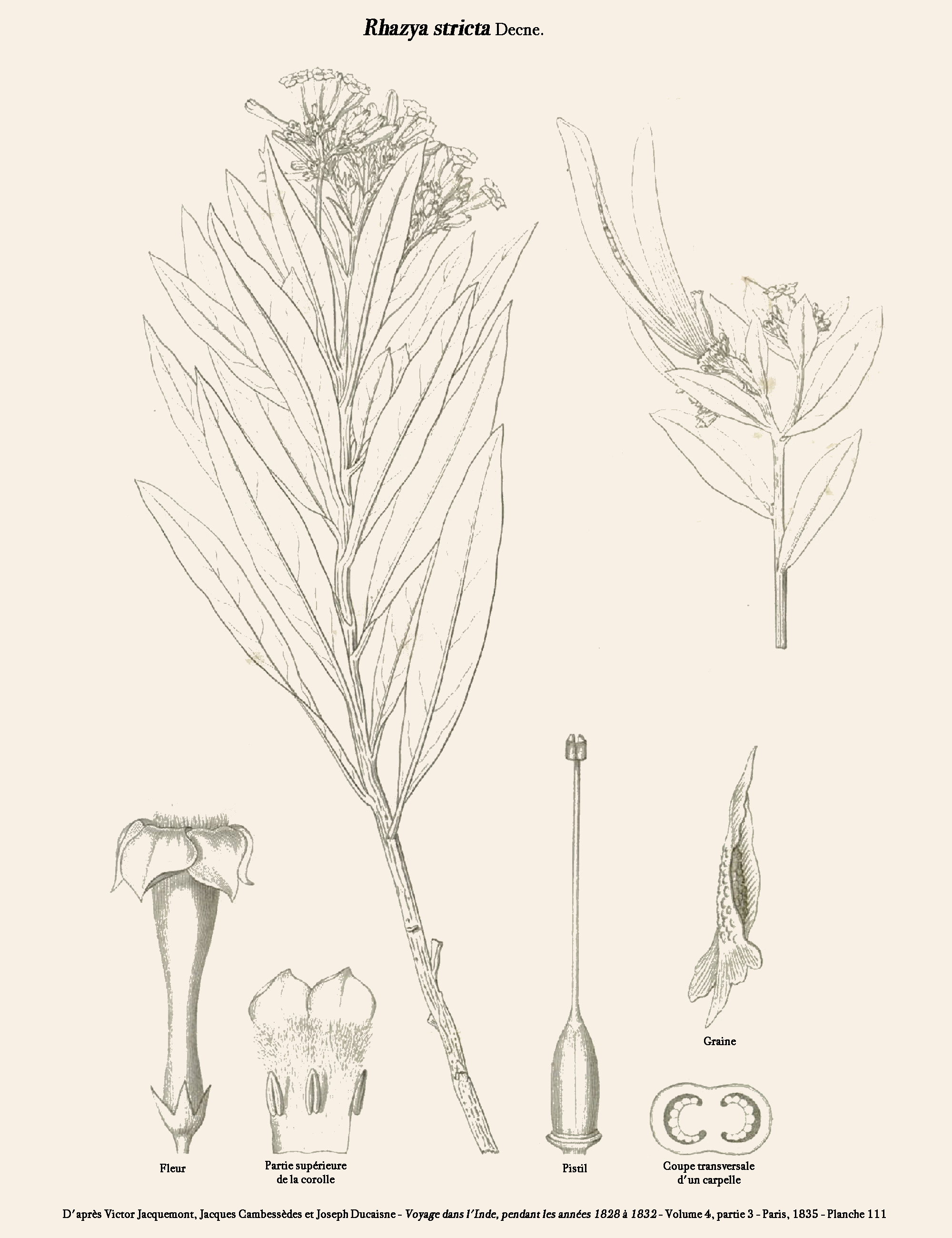
- Rhazya stricta

Scientific classification
- Kingdom: Plantae
- Clade: Tracheophytes
- Clade: Angiosperms
- Clade: Eudicots
- Clade: Asterids
- Order: Gentianales
- Family: Apocynaceae
- Subfamily: Rauvolfioideae
- Genus: Rhazya; Decne.

= Rhazya =

Genus of plants

Rhazya is a genus of plant in family Apocynaceae first described as a genus in 1835. It is native to Egypt and to southwestern Asia from the Arabian Peninsula to north-west India. The genus is placed in subfamily Rauvolfioideae.

== Species ==
As of November 2023, Plants of the World Online accepted two species:

- Rhazya greissii Täckh. & Boulos - Kharga Oasis in Egypt
- Rhazya stricta Decne. - Yemen, Saudi Arabia, Oman, Persian Gulf sheikdoms, Iraq, Iran, Afghanistan, Pakistan, India, Western Himalayas
