= Suicide of Jason Altom =

PhD student who committed suicide

Jason Altom (6 October 1971 – 15 August 1998) was an American PhD student working in the research group of Nobel laureate Elias James Corey at Harvard University. He died by suicide in 1998 by ingesting potassium cyanide, citing "abusive research supervisors" in his suicide note as one reason for taking his life. Altom was studying a complex natural product and experienced significant pressure to complete the molecule before starting his academic career.

Altom's suicide highlighted the pressures on PhD students, problems of isolation in graduate school, and sources of tension between graduate mentors and their students. His case prompted many US universities to insist that PhD students have an advisory committee in addition to a supervisor, to whom they might turn for support: James Anderson, who became Harvard Chemistry Department Chairman, stated that "Jason's death prompted an examination of the role the department should play in graduate students' lives". Anderson went on to promise that students will also have "confidential and seamless access" to psychological counselling services, paid for by the department. Harvard students are eligible for "as many visits as medically necessary" for mental health services through university health services (unless they opt out of the Student Health Fee), and can receive up to 52 visits per plan year under the Student Health Insurance Plan. As part of the Collective Bargaining Agreement between the Harvard Graduate Students Union and the university's administration, a fund was created to reimburse members "of any copays and other out-of-pocket medical expenses" incurred under the Student Health Insurance Plan; in 2024, it holds $530,000. The collective bargaining agreement also forces the university administration to disclose mental health resources to the union.

The molecule whose synthesis Altom was attempting to complete, aspidophytine, was subsequently completed by postdoctoral research associates and published in the Journal of the American Chemical Society in 1999. The article was dedicated to Altom's memory.

== See also ==
- Cornell gorge suicides
