= Plectaneia =

Scientific classification
- Kingdom: Plantae
- Clade: Tracheophytes
- Clade: Angiosperms
- Clade: Eudicots
- Clade: Asterids
- Order: Gentianales
- Family: Apocynaceae
- Subfamily: Rauvolfioideae
- Tribe: Alyxieae
- Subtribe: Condylocarpinae
- Genus: Plectaneia; Thouars

Genus of flowering plants

Plectaneia is a genus of plant in the family Apocynaceae first described as a genus in 1806. The entire genus is endemic to Madagascar.

Species

- Plectaneia longisepala Markgr.
- Plectaneia stenophylla Jum.
- Plectaneia thouarsii Roem. & Schult.
