= Rauvolfioideae =

- Alstonia venenata

Scientific classification
- Kingdom: Plantae
- Clade: Embryophytes
- Clade: Tracheophytes
- Clade: Angiosperms
- Clade: Eudicots
- Clade: Asterids
- Order: Gentianales
- Family: Apocynaceae
- Subfamily: Rauvolfioideae; Kostel.

Subfamily of flowering plants

Rauvolfioideae is a subfamily of the flowering plant family Apocynaceae (order Gentianales). Many species are woody lianas, others are shrubs or perennial herbs.

== Tribes and genera ==
To date (2022), eleven tribes have been erected:

=== Aspidospermateae ===
Authority: Miers, 1878

- Aspidosperma Mart. & Zucc., 1924
- Geissospermum Allemão, 1846
- Haplophyton A.DC., 1844
- Microplumeria Baill., 1899
- Strempeliopsis Benth., 1876
- Vallesia Ruiz & Pav., 1794

=== Alstonieae ===
Authority: G. Don, 1837

- Alstonia R. Br., 1810
- Dyera Hook. F., 1882

=== Vinceae ===
Authority: Duby, 1828

subtribe Kopsiinae Leeuwenb., 1994

- Kopsia Blume, 1823

subtribe Ochrosiinae Pichon ex Boiteau, 1981

- Ochrosia Juss, 1789

subtribe Tonduziinae M.E. Endress, 2014

- Laxoplumeria Markgr., 1926
- Tonduzia Pittier, 1908

subtribe Vincinae M.E. Endress, 2014

- Vinca L., 1853

subtribe Catharanthinae Pichon ex Boiteau, 1981

- Catharanthus G. Don, 1837
- Kamettia Kostel., 1834
- Petchia Livera, 1926

subtribe Rauvolfiinae Benth. & Hook.f., 1876

- Rauvolfia L., 1753

=== Willughbeieae ===
Authority: A.DC., 1844

subtribe Leuconotidinae Pichon ex Leeuwenb., 1994

- Bousigonia Pierre, 1898
- Cyclocotyla Stapf, 1908
- Leuconotis Jack, 1823

subtribe Willughbeiinae A.DC., 1844

- Willughbeia Roxb., 1820

subtribe Lacmelleinae Pichon ex Leeuwenb., 1994

- Couma Aubl., 1775
- Hancornia Gomes, 1803
- Lacmellea H. Karst., 1857
- Parahancornia Ducke, 1922

subtribe Landolphiinae K. Schum., 1895

- Ancylobothrys Pierre, 1898
- Chamaeclitandra (Stapf) Pichon, 1953
- Clitandra Benth., 1849
- Cylindropsis Pierre, 1898
- Dictyophleba Pierre, 1898
- Landolphia P. Beauv., 1804
- Orthopichonia H. Huber, 1962
- Pacouria Aubl., 1775
- Saba (Pichon) Pichon, 1953
- Vahadenia Stapf, 1902

=== Tabernaemontaneae ===
Authority: G. Don, 1838

subtribe Ambelaniinae A.O. Simões & M.E. Endress, 2010

- Ambelania Aubl., 1775
- Macoubea Aubl., 1775
- Molongum Pichon, 1948
- Mucoa Zarucchi, 1988
- Neocouma Pierre, 1898
- Rhigospira Miers, 1878
- Spongiosperma Zarucchi, 1988

subtribe Tabernaemontaninae A.DC., 1844

- Callichilia Stapf, 1902
- Calocrater K. Schum., 1895
- Carvalhoa K. Schum., 1895
- Crioceras Pierre, 1897
- Schizozygia Baill., 1888
- Tabernaemontana L., 1753
- Tabernanthe Baill., 1888
- Voacanga Thouars, 1806

=== Melodineae ===
Authority: G. Don, 1837

- Diplorhynchus Welw. ex Ficalho & Hiern., 1881
- Craspidospermum Bojer ex A. DC., 1844
- Melodinus J.R. Forst. & G. Forst., 1776
- Pycnobotrya Benth., 1876
- Stephanostegia Baill., 1888

=== Hunterieae ===
Authority: Miers, 1878

- Gonioma E. Mey., 1938
- Hunteria Roxb., 1824
- Picralima Pierre, 1896
- Pleiocarpa Benth., 1876

=== Amsonieae ===
Authority: M.E. Endress, 2014

- Amsonia Walter, 1788
- Rhazya Decne., 1835

=== Alyxieae ===
Authority: G. Don, 1837

subtribe Condylocarpinae Pichon ex Leeuwenb., 1994

- Chilocarpus Blume, 1895
- Condylocarpon Desf., 1822
- Plectaneia Thouars, 1806

subtribe Alyxiinae A.DC., 1844

- Alyxia Banks ex R. Br., 1810
- Lepinia Decne., 1849
- Lepiniopsis Valeton, 1895
- Pteralyxia K. Schum., 1895

=== Plumerieae ===
Authority: E. Mey., 1838

subtribe Allamandinae A.DC., 1844

- Allamanda L., 1771

subtribe Plumeriinae Pichon ex Leeuwenb., 1994

- Himatanthus Willd. ex. Schult., 1819
- Mortoniella Woodson, 1939
- Plumeria L., 1753

subtribe Thevetiinae A.DC., 1844

- Anechites Griseb., 1861
- Cameraria L., 1753
- Cerbera L., 1753
- Cerberiopsis Viell. ex Pancher & Sébert, 1874
- Skytanthus Meyen, 1834
- Thevetia L., 1758

=== Carisseae ===
Authority: Dumort, 1829

- Acokanthera G. Don, 1838
- Carissa L., 1767
