= Bousigonia =

Scientific classification
- Kingdom: Plantae
- Clade: Tracheophytes
- Clade: Angiosperms
- Clade: Eudicots
- Clade: Asterids
- Order: Gentianales
- Family: Apocynaceae
- Subfamily: Rauvolfioideae
- Tribe: Willughbeieae
- Subtribe: Leuconotidinae
- Genus: Bousigonia; Pierre

Genus of plants

Bousigonia is a genus of plants in the family Apocynaceae, first described as a genus in 1898. It is native to Indochina and southern China.

Species

- Bousigonia angustifolia Pierre ex Spire - Yunnan, Laos, Thailand, Vietnam
- Bousigonia mekongensis Pierre - Yunnan, Laos, Vietnam
- Bousigonia tonkinensis Eberh. - Vietnam
