= Pteralyxia kauaiensis =

Conservation status
- Endangered (IUCN 3.1)

Scientific classification
- Kingdom: Plantae
- Clade: Tracheophytes
- Clade: Angiosperms
- Clade: Eudicots
- Clade: Asterids
- Order: Gentianales
- Family: Apocynaceae
- Genus: Pteralyxia
- Species: P. kauaiensis

Binomial name
- Pteralyxia kauaiensis Caum

Species of plant

Pteralyxia kauaiensis, also called Kaulu or Kauaʻi pteralyxia, is a species of plant in the family Apocynaceae. It is endemic to the island of Kauaʻi in the Hawaiian Islands. It is threatened by habitat loss and degradation. There are no more than 1000 individuals remaining. It is federally listed as an endangered species of the United States.
