= Cyclocotyla =

Scientific classification
- Kingdom: Plantae
- Clade: Tracheophytes
- Clade: Angiosperms
- Clade: Eudicots
- Clade: Asterids
- Order: Gentianales
- Family: Apocynaceae
- Subfamily: Rauvolfioideae
- Tribe: Willughbeieae
- Subtribe: Leuconotidinae
- Genus: Cyclocotyla; Stapf
- Species: C. congolensis

Binomial name
- Cyclocotyla congolensis Stapf

Synonyms
- Cyclocotyla oligosperma Wernham; Alafia vermeulenii De Wild.

Genus of plants

Cyclocotyla is a genus of plants first described in 1908. It contains only one known species, Cyclocotyla congolensis, native to central Africa (Nigeria, Cameroon, Gabon, Central African Republic, Republic of Congo, Democratic Republic of the Congo).
