= Calocrater =

Scientific classification
- Kingdom: Plantae
- Clade: Tracheophytes
- Clade: Angiosperms
- Clade: Eudicots
- Clade: Asterids
- Order: Gentianales
- Family: Apocynaceae
- Subfamily: Rauvolfioideae
- Tribe: Tabernaemontaneae
- Subtribe: Tabernaemontaninae
- Genus: Calocrater; K.Schum.
- Species: C. preussii

Binomial name
- Calocrater preussii Pierre ex Spire

Synonyms
- Colocrater K.Schum.

Genus of plants

Calocrater is a genus of plant in the family Apocynaceae first described as a genus in 1895. It contains only one known species, Calocrater preussii, native to central Africa (Cameroon, Gabon, Congo-Brazzaville).
