= Aspidophytine =

Identifiers
CAS Number	16625-21-1
3D model (JSmol)	Interactive image
ChemSpider	9958575
PubChem CID	11783895
UNII	94KD3FMX4F
CompTox Dashboard (EPA)	DTXSID30472559
- InChI: InChI=1S/C22H26N2O4/c1-23-16-7-9-20-8-4-11-24-12-10-21(16,22(20,24)28-17(25)13-20)14-5-6-15(26-2)19(27-3)18(14)23/h5-7,9,16H,4,8,10-13H2,1-3H3/t16-,20-,21-,22+/m1/s1 Key: QESOHAISGSLAAJ-DHWLSRIRSA-N
- SMILES: O=C5O[C@@]63N2CCC[C@@]6(\C=C/[C@H]4N(c1c(ccc(OC)c1OC)[C@@]34CC2)C)C5

Properties
Chemical formula	C_{22}H_{26}N_{2}O_{4}
Molar mass	382.45 g/mol
- Except where otherwise noted, data are given for materials in their standard state (at 25 °C [77 °F], 100 kPa). verify (what is ?) Infobox references

Aspidophytine is an indole alkaloid that has attracted significant attention from synthetic chemists. An extract of the cockroach plant, aspidophytine is an insecticidal substance particularly effective against cockroaches. It is one of the two components of the dimer haplophytine.

In his suicide note, Harvard doctoral student Jason Altom mentioned his stress in attempting to devise a synthetic pathway for the aspidophytine sub-unit of haplophytine as a contributing factor to his psychological breakdown.
