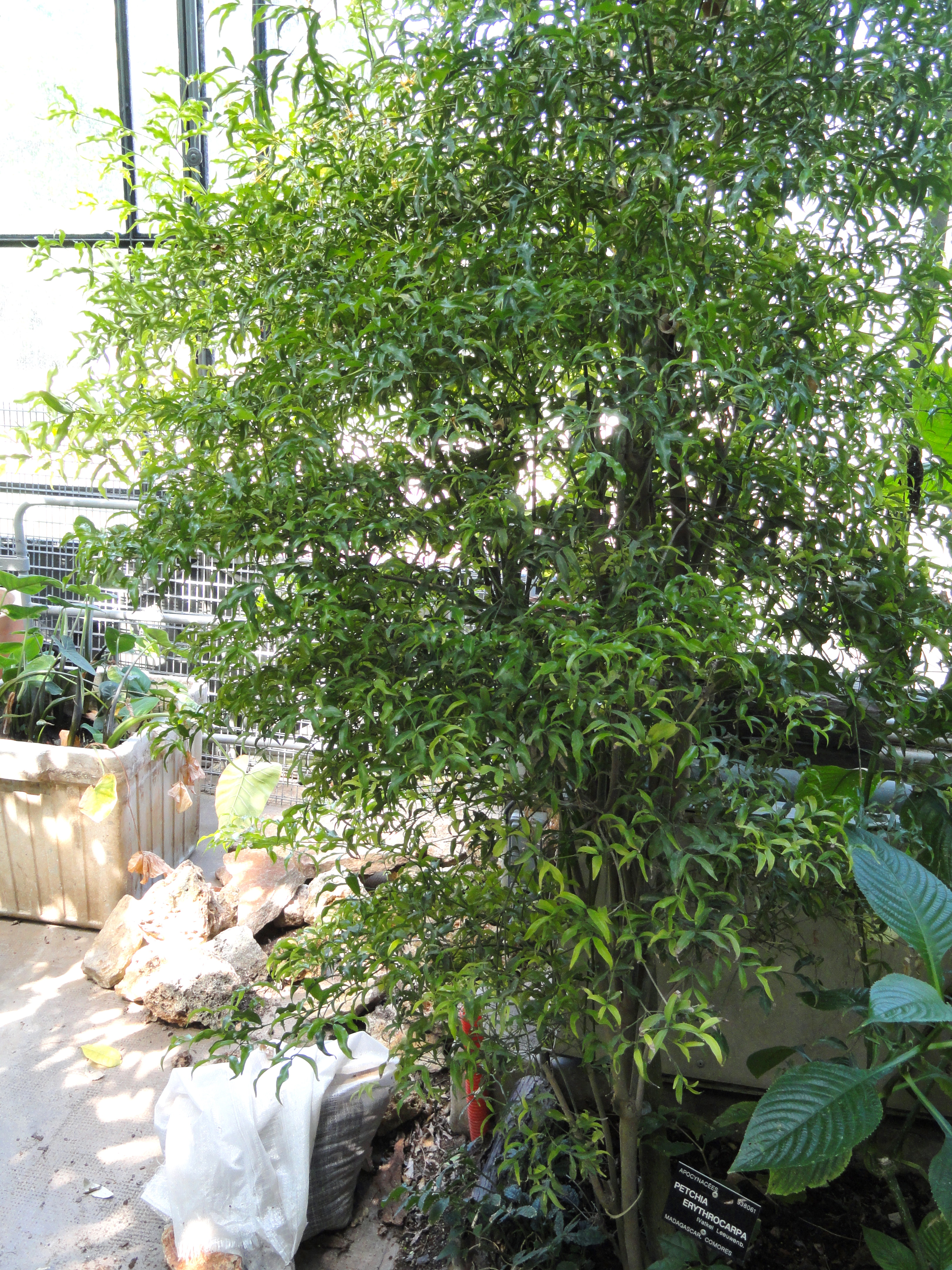
- Petchia erythrocarpa Jardin Botanique de Lyon

Scientific classification
- Kingdom: Plantae
- Clade: Tracheophytes
- Clade: Angiosperms
- Clade: Eudicots
- Clade: Asterids
- Order: Gentianales
- Family: Apocynaceae
- Subfamily: Rauvolfioideae
- Tribe: Vinceae
- Subtribe: Catharanthinae
- Genus: Petchia; Livera

Synonyms
- Cabucala Pichon

= Petchia =

Genus of flowering plants

Petchia is a genus of plant in the family Apocynaceae, first described as a genus in 1926. It is native to Madagascar, Cameroon, the Comoros and Sri Lanka.

Species

1. Petchia africana Leeuwenb. - Cameroon
2. Petchia ceylanica (Wight) Livera - Sri Lanka
3. Petchia cryptophlebia (Baker) Leeuwenb. - Madagascar
4. Petchia erythrocarpa (Vatke) Leeuwenb. - Comoros, Madagascar
5. Petchia humbertii (Markgr.) Leeuwenb. - Madagascar
6. Petchia madagascariensis (A.DC.) Leeuwenb. - Madagascar
7. Petchia montana (Pichon) Leeuwenb. - Madagascar
8. Petchia plectaneiifolia (Pichon) Leeuwenb. - Madagascar
