= Chilocarpus =

Scientific classification
- Kingdom: Plantae
- Clade: Tracheophytes
- Clade: Angiosperms
- Clade: Eudicots
- Clade: Asterids
- Order: Gentianales
- Family: Apocynaceae
- Subfamily: Rauvolfioideae
- Tribe: Alyxieae
- Subtribe: Condylocarpinae
- Genus: Chilocarpus; Blume

Synonyms
- Neokeithia Steenis

Genus of plants

Chilocarpus is a genus of plant in the family Apocynaceae, first described as a genus in 1823. The genus is native to India, Southeast Asia, and New Guinea.

Species

1. Chilocarpus beccarianus Pierre - Borneo
2. Chilocarpus conspicuus (Steenis) Markgr. - Borneo
3. Chilocarpus costatus Miq. - Borneo, Sumatra, W Malaysia, Thailand, Myanmar
4. Chilocarpus decipiens Hook.f. - Sumatra, W Malaysia
5. Chilocarpus denudatus Blume - S India, Nicobar Islands, Indochina, Malaysia, Indonesia, New Guinea
6. Chilocarpus hirtus D.J.Middleton - Borneo, Sumatra
7. Chilocarpus obtusifolius Merr. - Borneo, Sumatra, W Malaysia
8. Chilocarpus pubescens D.J.Middleton - Borneo
9. Chilocarpus rostratus Markgr. - Borneo, Sumatra, W Malaysia, Thailand
10. Chilocarpus sarawakensis D.J.Middleton - Sarawak
11. Chilocarpus steenisianus Markgr. - Borneo
12. Chilocarpus suaveolens Blume - Borneo, Sumatra, Java
13. Chilocarpus torulosus (Boerl.) Markgr. - Borneo
14. Chilocarpus vernicosus Blume - Borneo, Sumatra, W Malaysia
