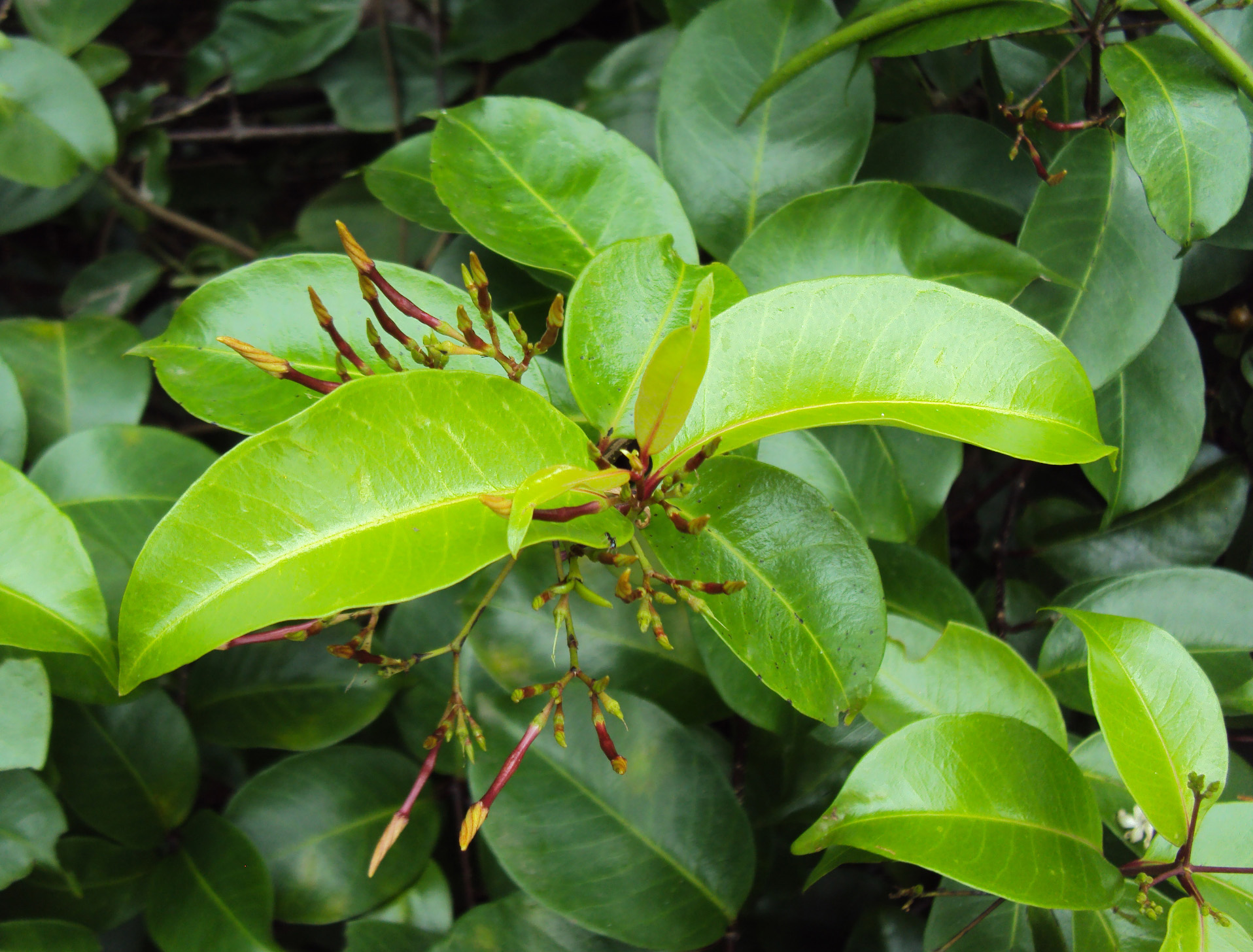
- Kamettia caryophyllata

Scientific classification
- Kingdom: Plantae
- Clade: Tracheophytes
- Clade: Angiosperms
- Clade: Eudicots
- Clade: Asterids
- Order: Gentianales
- Family: Apocynaceae
- Subfamily: Rauvolfioideae
- Tribe: Vinceae
- Subtribe: Catharanthinae
- Genus: Kamettia; Kostel.

Synonyms
- Ellertonia Wight

= Kamettia =

Genus of plants

Kamettia is a genus of flowering plant sin the family Apocynaceae first described as a genus in 1834. It is native to India and Thailand.

Species

- Kamettia caryophyllata (Roxb.) Nicolson & Suresh - W + S India
- Kamettia chandeei D.J.Middleton - Thailand
