= Cameraria microphylla =

Conservation status
- Endangered (IUCN 2.3)

Scientific classification
- Kingdom: Plantae
- Clade: Tracheophytes
- Clade: Angiosperms
- Clade: Eudicots
- Clade: Asterids
- Order: Gentianales
- Family: Apocynaceae
- Genus: Cameraria
- Species: C. microphylla

Binomial name
- Cameraria microphylla Britton

Species of plant

Cameraria microphylla is a species of plant in the family Apocynaceae. It is endemic to Cuba. It is threatened by habitat loss.
