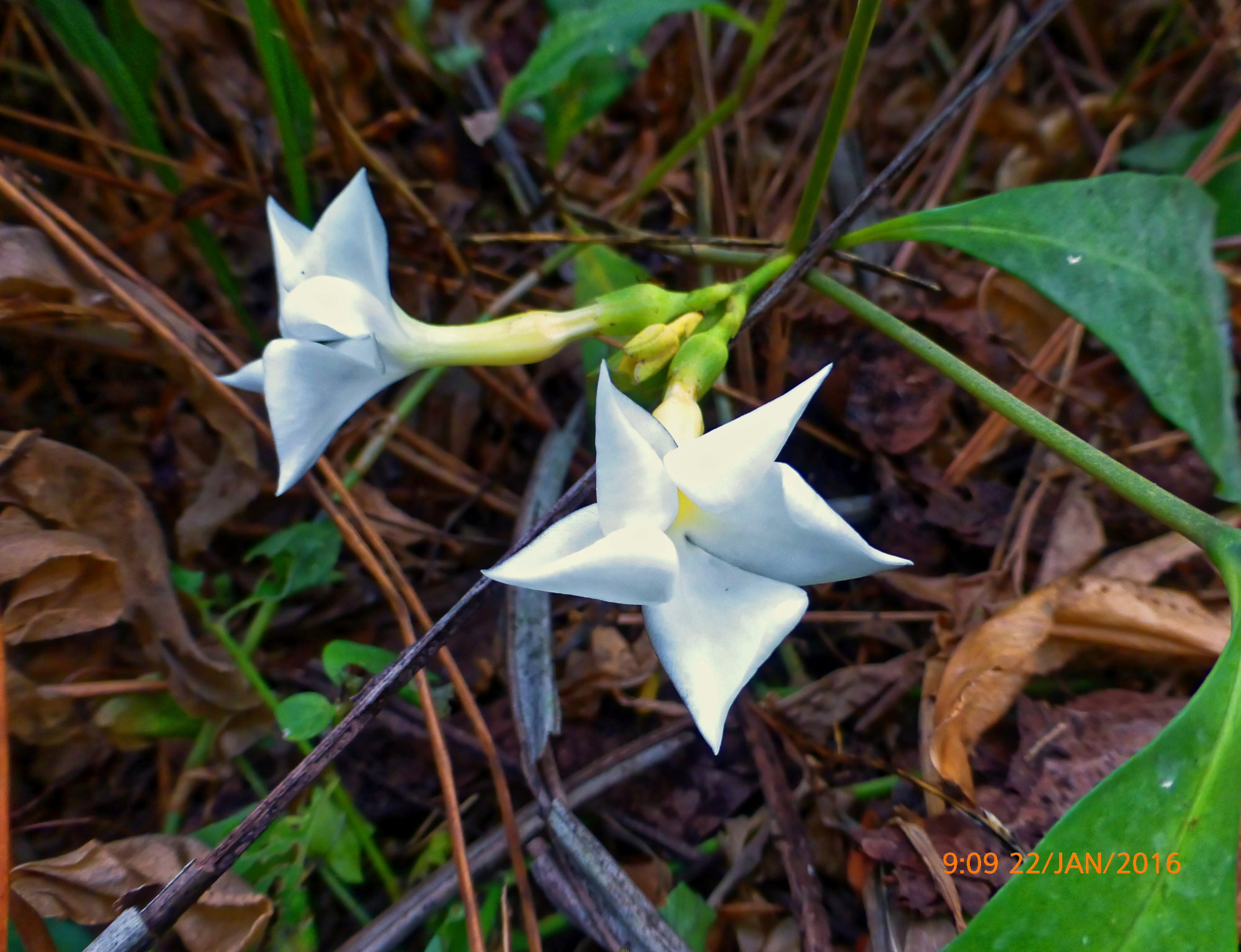
- Callichilia barteri

Scientific classification
- Kingdom: Plantae
- Clade: Embryophytes
- Clade: Tracheophytes
- Clade: Spermatophytes
- Clade: Angiosperms
- Clade: Eudicots
- Clade: Asterids
- Order: Gentianales
- Family: Apocynaceae
- Subfamily: Rauvolfioideae
- Tribe: Tabernaemontaneae
- Subtribe: Tabernaemontaninae
- Genus: Callichilia; Stapf

Synonyms
- Hedranthera (Stapf) Pichon

= Callichilia =

Genus of plants

Callichilia is a genus of plant in the family Apocynaceae, native to tropical Africa.

== Species ==
As of July 2020, Plants of the World Online accepts these species:

- Callichilia barteri (Hook.f.) Stapf - Togo, Benin, Nigeria, Cameroon, Republic of the Congo, Democratic Republic of the Congo
- Callichilia basileis Beentje - Nigeria, Cameroon
- Callichilia bequaertii De Wild. - Nigeria, Cameroon, Republic of the Congo, Gabon, Cabinda, Central African Republic, Democratic Republic of the Congo
- Callichilia inaequalis Stapf - Nigeria, Cameroon, Gabon
- Callichilia monopodialis (K.Schum) Stapf - Nigeria, Cameroon, Republic of the Congo
- Callichilia subsessilis (Benth.) Stapf - Ghana, Guinea, Ivory Coast, Liberia, Sierra Leone, Nigeria, Republic of the Congo
