= Petchia madagascariensis =

Conservation status
- Least Concern (IUCN 3.1)

Scientific classification
- Kingdom: Plantae
- Clade: Embryophytes
- Clade: Tracheophytes
- Clade: Angiosperms
- Clade: Eudicots
- Clade: Asterids
- Order: Gentianales
- Family: Apocynaceae
- Genus: Petchia
- Species: P. madagascariensis

Binomial name
- Petchia madagascariensis (A.DC.) Leeuwenb.

Synonyms
- List: Alyxia madagascariensis A.DC.; Alyxia polysperma Scott-Elliot; Cabucala crassifolia Pichon; Cabucala fasciculata Pichon; Cabucala glauca Pichon; Cabucala intermedia Pichon; Cabucala longipes Pichon; Cabucala macrophylla Pichon; Cabucala madagascariensis (A.DC.) Pichon; Cabucala multiflora Pichon; Cabucala penduliflora Markgr.; Cabucala polysperma (Scott-Elliot) Pichon; Cabucala torulosa Pichon; Gynopogon madagascariensis (A.DC.) K.Schum; Pulassarium madagascariense (A.DC.) Kuntze

Species of plant

Petchia madagascariensis is a plant in the family Apocynaceae.

== Description ==
Petchia madagascariensis grows as a shrub or small tree up to 10 metres (33 ft) tall, with a trunk diameter of up to 25 cm (10 in). Its flowers feature a creamy to yellow corolla. The fruit is orange with paired cylindrical follicles. Local traditional medicinal uses include as a treatment for stomach-ache, gonorrhoea, rheumatism, gout, malaria and as a diuretic and anthelmintic.

== Distribution and habitat ==
Petchia madagascariensis is endemic to Madagascar. Its habitat is evergreen forest, mostly coastal, from sea level to 1,600 metres (5,200 ft) altitude.
