= Spongiosperma =

Scientific classification
- Kingdom: Plantae
- Clade: Tracheophytes
- Clade: Angiosperms
- Clade: Eudicots
- Clade: Asterids
- Order: Gentianales
- Family: Apocynaceae
- Subfamily: Rauvolfioideae
- Tribe: Tabernaemontaneae
- Subtribe: Ambelaniinae
- Genus: Spongiosperma; Zarucchi

Genus of plants

Spongiosperma is a genus of plant in family Apocynaceae first described as a genus in 1988. It is native to the South America, nations of Venezuela, Colombia, and Brazil.

Species

- Spongiosperma cataractarum Zarucchi - Bolívar State in SE Venezuela
- Spongiosperma grandiflorum (Huber) Zarucchi - Amapá, Pará, Maranhão
- Spongiosperma longilobum (Markgr.) Zarucchi - Amazonas State in NW Brazil
- Spongiosperma macrophyllum (Müll.Arg.) Zarucchi - S Venezuela, SE Colombia, NW Brazil
- Spongiosperma oleifolium (Monach.) Zarucchi - Amazonas State in S Venezuela
- Spongiosperma riparium (Monach.) Zarucchi - S Venezuela, SE Colombia
