= Vahadenia =

Scientific classification
- Kingdom: Plantae
- Clade: Tracheophytes
- Clade: Angiosperms
- Clade: Eudicots
- Clade: Asterids
- Order: Gentianales
- Family: Apocynaceae
- Subfamily: Rauvolfioideae
- Tribe: Willughbeieae
- Subtribe: Landolphiinae
- Genus: Vahadenia; Stapf

Genus of flowering plants

Vahadenia is a genus of flowering plants in the family Apocynaceae, first described as a genus in 1902. It is native to tropical Africa.

Species

- Vahadenia caillei (A.Chev.) Stapf ex Hutch. & Dalziel - Guinea, Ivory Coast, Sierra Leone
- Vahadenia laurentii (De Wild.) Stapf - Nigeria, Cameroon, Gabon, Republic of Congo, Central African Republic, Zaire, Angola
