= Chilocarpus beccarianus =

Scientific classification
- Kingdom: Plantae
- Clade: Tracheophytes
- Clade: Angiosperms
- Clade: Eudicots
- Clade: Asterids
- Order: Gentianales
- Family: Apocynaceae
- Genus: Chilocarpus
- Species: C. beccarianus

Binomial name
- Chilocarpus beccarianus Pierre

Species of plant

Chilocarpus beccarianus is a plant in the genus Chilocarpus, in the family Apocynaceae. It is native to Borneo. It is an accepted species, first described by Jean Baptiste Louis Pierre and originally published in Bull. Mens. Soc. Linn. Paris, n.s., 1: 101 (1898).

It is a large woody climber which grows up to 15 metres tall. Its branchlets are glabrous, rarely puberulent. Its leaves are described as: "Inflorescence terminal and axillary in uppermost leaf axils (sometimes these uppermost leaves greatly reduced in size), forming a terminal panicle mostly longer than subtending leaves, occasionally shorter, 3.2-13.7 cm long, lax, puberulent to completely glabrous except occasionally for a few hairs on bracts; Stamens inserted at 2-3.1 mm from corolla base which is 0.3-0.4 of tube length." It has fusiform fruit with slight constrictions, measuring 5.5-10.5 by 1.5-2.7 cm. Its seeds are large.
