= Mortoniella =

Scientific classification
- Kingdom: Plantae
- Clade: Tracheophytes
- Clade: Angiosperms
- Clade: Eudicots
- Clade: Asterids
- Order: Gentianales
- Family: Apocynaceae
- Subfamily: Rauvolfioideae
- Tribe: Plumerieae
- Subtribe: Plumeriinae
- Genus: Mortoniella; Woodson
- Species: M. pittieri

Binomial name
- Mortoniella pittieri Benth.

Synonyms
- Morleya Woodson; Morleya leipocalyx Woodson

Genus of plants

Mortoniella is a monotypic genus of flowering plants in the family Apocynaceae, first described as a genus in 1939. It contains only one known species, Mortoniella pittieri, native to Central America (Belize, Costa Rica, Nicaragua).

The genus name of Mortoniella is in honour of Conrad Vernon Morton (1905–1972), an American botanist who did notable writings on Ferns. It was first described and published in Ann. Missouri Bot. Gard. Vol.26 on page 257 in 1939.
