= Dictyophleba =

Scientific classification
- Kingdom: Plantae
- Clade: Tracheophytes
- Clade: Angiosperms
- Clade: Eudicots
- Clade: Asterids
- Order: Gentianales
- Family: Apocynaceae
- Subfamily: Rauvolfioideae
- Tribe: Willughbeieae
- Subtribe: Landolphiinae
- Genus: Dictyophleba; Pierre

Synonyms
- Sclerodictyon Pierre

Genus of plants

Dictyophleba is a genus of flowering plants in the family Apocynaceae first described as a genus in 1898. It is native to Africa and to the Comoros Islands in the Indian Ocean.

Species

1. Dictyophleba leonensis (Stapf) Pichon - West Africa from Cameroon to Liberia
2. Dictyophleba lucida (K.Schum.) Pierre - Comoros, central + southern Africa from Nigeria east to Tanzania and south to Zimbabwe
3. Dictyophleba ochracea (K.Schum. ex Hallier f.) Pichon - central Africa from Nigeria to Zaire
4. Dictyophleba rudens Hepper - Cameroon
5. Dictyophleba setosa B.de Hoogh - Cameroon, Gabon
6. Dictyophleba stipulosa (S.Moore ex Wernham) Pichon - from Ivory Coast to Congo-Brazzaville
