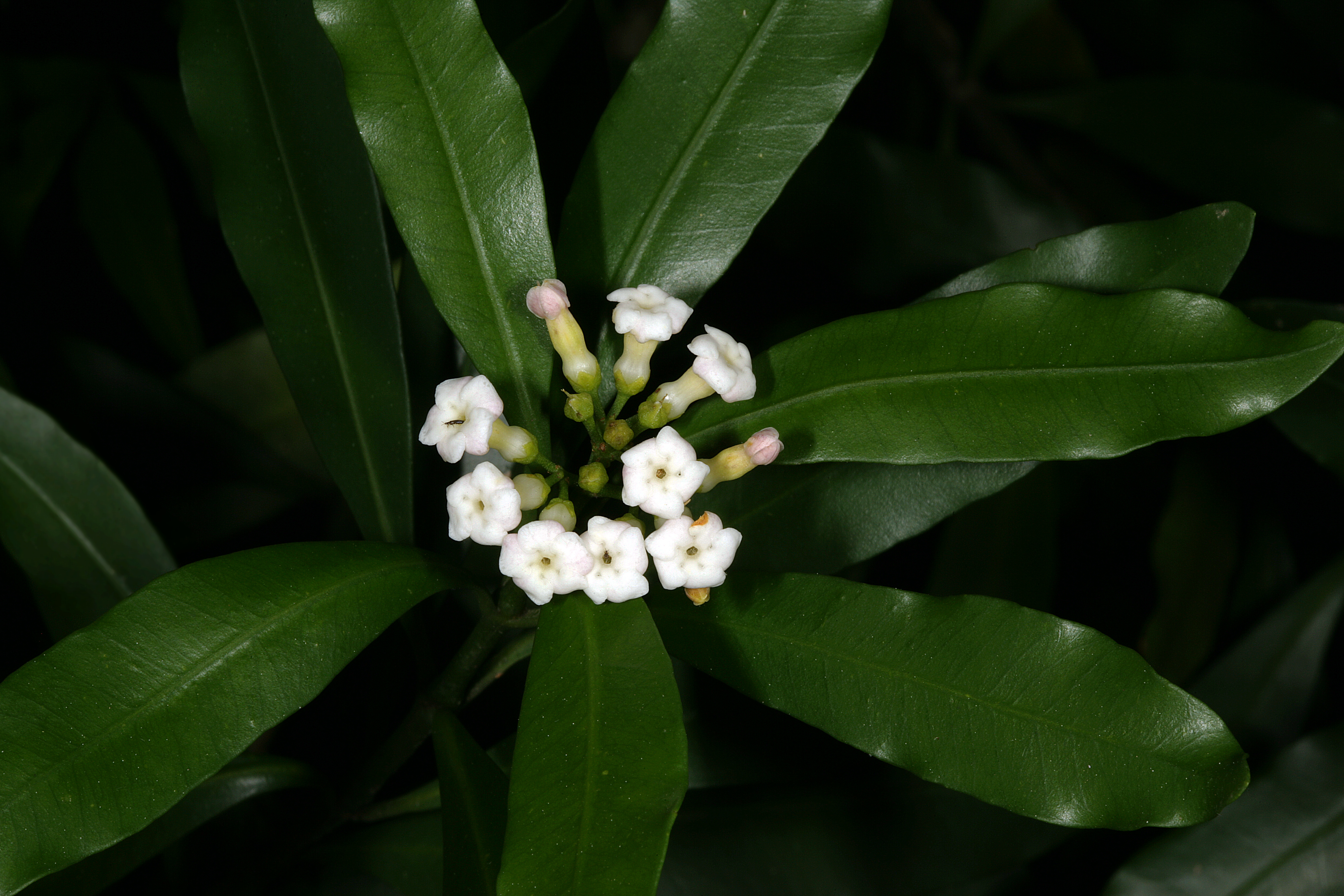
- Gonioma kamassi

Scientific classification
- Kingdom: Plantae
- Clade: Embryophytes
- Clade: Tracheophytes
- Clade: Spermatophytes
- Clade: Angiosperms
- Clade: Eudicots
- Clade: Asterids
- Order: Gentianales
- Family: Apocynaceae
- Subfamily: Rauvolfioideae
- Tribe: Hunterieae
- Genus: Gonioma; E.Mey.

= Gonioma =

Genus of plants

Gonioma is a genus of flowering plants in the family Apocynaceae first described as a genus in 1838. It is native to South Africa, Madagascar, and Eswatini.

Species

- Gonioma kamassi E.Mey. - Cape Province, Eswatini, KwaZulu-Natal
- Gonioma malagasy Markgr. & Boiteau - Madagascar
