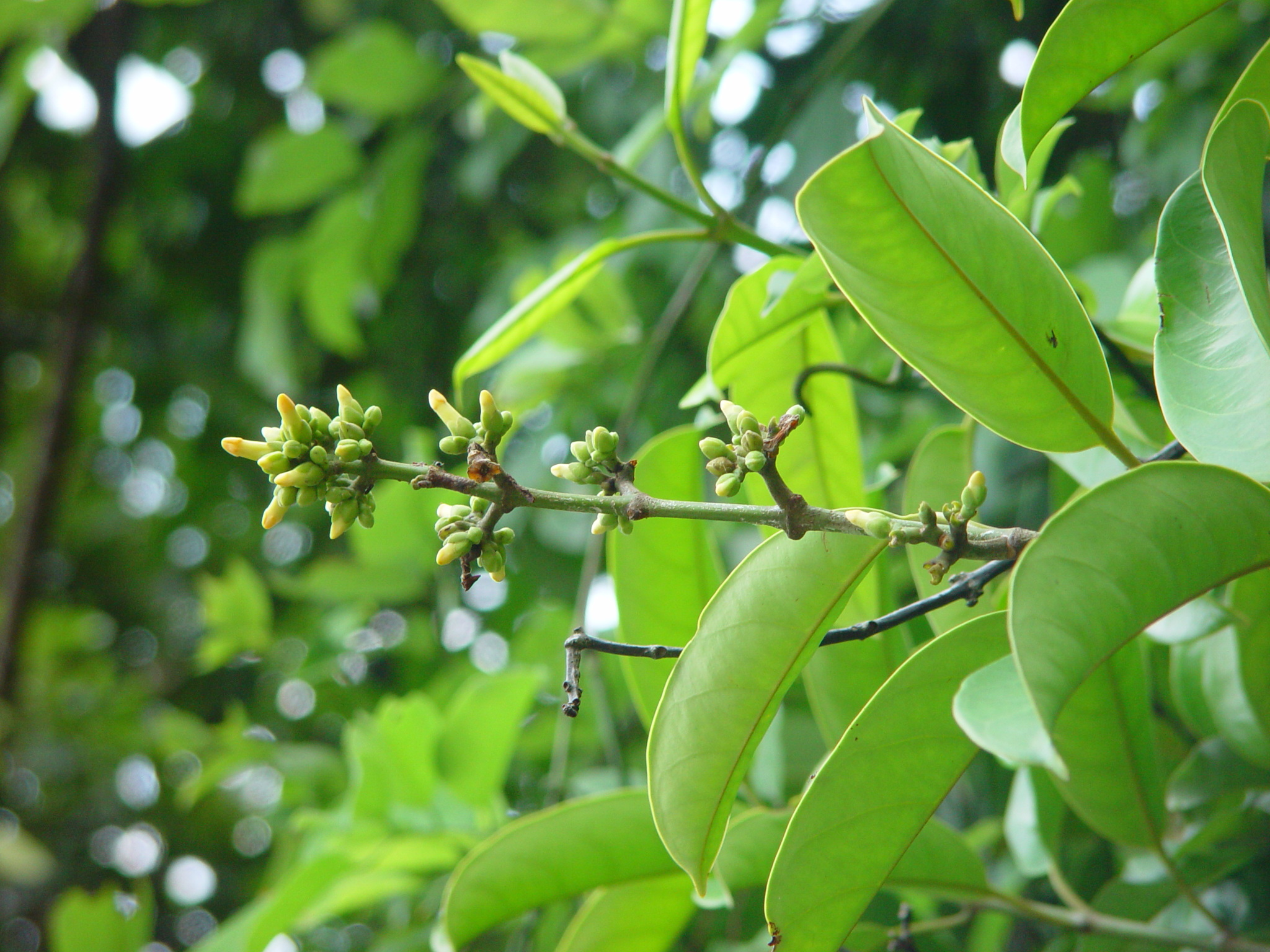
- Leuconotis griffithii in Singapore

Scientific classification
- Kingdom: Plantae
- Clade: Tracheophytes
- Clade: Angiosperms
- Clade: Eudicots
- Clade: Asterids
- Order: Gentianales
- Family: Apocynaceae
- Subfamily: Rauvolfioideae
- Tribe: Willughbeieae
- Subtribe: Leuconotidinae
- Genus: Leuconotis; Jack

= Leuconotis =

Genus of plants

Leuconotis is a genus of plant in family Apocynaceae first described as a genus in 1823. It is native to Southeast Asia (Thailand, Borneo, Malaysia, Sumatra).

Species

- Leuconotis anceps Jack - W Malaysia, Borneo, Sumatra
- Leuconotis bullata Leeuwenb. - Sabah
- Leuconotis eugeniifolia (Wall. ex G.Don) A.DC. - W Malaysia, Borneo, Sumatra
- Leuconotis griffithii Hook.f. - S Thailand, W Malaysia, Borneo, Sumatra
