= Stephanostegia capuronii =

Conservation status
- Least Concern (IUCN 3.1)

Scientific classification
- Kingdom: Plantae
- Clade: Tracheophytes
- Clade: Angiosperms
- Clade: Eudicots
- Clade: Asterids
- Order: Gentianales
- Family: Apocynaceae
- Genus: Stephanostegia
- Species: S. capuronii

Binomial name
- Stephanostegia capuronii Markgr.

Synonyms
- Stephanostegia brevis Markgr.

Species of plant

Stephanostegia capuronii is a species of plant in the family Apocynaceae. It is endemic to Madagascar.

The Latin specific epithet of capuronii is in honor of the French botanist René Capuron. It was first published in Adansonia, n.s., Vol.12 on page 219 in 1972.
