= Pycnobotrya =

Scientific classification
- Kingdom: Plantae
- Clade: Tracheophytes
- Clade: Angiosperms
- Clade: Eudicots
- Clade: Asterids
- Order: Gentianales
- Family: Apocynaceae
- Subfamily: Rauvolfioideae
- Tribe: Melodineae
- Genus: Pycnobotrya; Benth.
- Species: P. nitida

Binomial name
- Pycnobotrya nitida Benth.

Synonyms
- Pycnobotrya multiflora K.Schum ex Stapf

Genus of plants

Pycnobotrya is a monotypic genus of plant in the family Apocynaceae found in tropical Africa. As of August 2013 the World Checklist of Selected Plant Families recognises the single species Pycnobotrya nitida.

Pycnobotrya nitida grows as a liana up to 40 metres (130 ft) long, with a stem diameter of up to 12 centimetres (4.7 in). Its fragrant flowers feature a dark pink corolla, sometimes with pale yellow throat. Fruit consists of paired follicles, each up to 7 centimetres (2.8 in) long. Habitat is forest, often on river banks. Local medicinal uses include as a treatment for chest infections, haematuria, diarrhoea, dysentery and bronchitis. P. nitida is found in Nigeria, Cameroon, the Central African Republic, Gabon, the Republic of Congo and the Democratic Republic of Congo.
