= Carvalhoa =

Scientific classification
- Kingdom: Plantae
- Clade: Tracheophytes
- Clade: Angiosperms
- Clade: Eudicots
- Clade: Asterids
- Order: Gentianales
- Family: Apocynaceae
- Subfamily: Rauvolfioideae
- Tribe: Tabernaemontaneae
- Subtribe: Tabernaemontaninae
- Genus: Carvalhoa; K.Schum.

Type species
- Carvalhoa campanulata K.Schum.

Genus of flowering plants

Carvalhoa is a genus of plants in the family Apocynaceae first described as a genus in 1895. It is native to tropical Africa.

== Species ==
- Carvalhoa campanulata K.Schum. – Mozambique
- Carvalhoa macrophylla K.Schum. – Kenya, Mozambique, Tanzania, Malawi, Zambia
