= Neocouma =

Scientific classification
- Kingdom: Plantae
- Clade: Tracheophytes
- Clade: Angiosperms
- Clade: Eudicots
- Clade: Asterids
- Order: Gentianales
- Family: Apocynaceae
- Subfamily: Rauvolfioideae
- Tribe: Tabernaemontaneae
- Subtribe: Ambelaniinae
- Genus: Neocouma; Pierre

Genus of plants

Neocouma is a genus of plant in the family Apocynaceae first described as a genus in 1898. It is native to northern South America.

Species

- Neocouma parviflora (Markgr.) Zarucchi - S Venezuela, N Brazil
- Neocouma ternstroemiacea (Müll.Arg.) Pierre - Venezuela, N Brazil, Colombia, Peru

formerly included

Neocouma duckei Markgr. = Mucoa duckei (Markgr.) Zarucchi
