= Pleiocarpa pycnantha =

Conservation status
- Least Concern (IUCN 3.1)

Scientific classification
- Kingdom: Plantae
- Clade: Tracheophytes
- Clade: Angiosperms
- Clade: Eudicots
- Clade: Asterids
- Order: Gentianales
- Family: Apocynaceae
- Genus: Pleiocarpa
- Species: P. pycnantha

Binomial name
- Pleiocarpa pycnantha (K.Schum) Stapf

Synonyms
- List: Hunteria breviloba Hallier f.; Hunteria pycnantha K.Schum; Pleiocarpa bagshawei S.Moore; Pleiocarpa breviloba (Hallier f.) Stapf; Pleiocarpa flavescens Stapf; Pleiocarpa micrantha Stapf; Pleiocarpa microcarpa Stapf; Pleiocarpa swynnertonii S.Moore; Pleiocarpa tubicina Stapf; Pleiocarpa welwitschii Stapf ex Hiern

Species of plant in the family Apocynaceae

Pleiocarpa pycnantha is a plant in the family Apocynaceae.

== Description ==
Pleiocarpa pycnantha grows as a shrub or tree. Its fragrant flowers feature a white to creamy-yellow corolla. The fruit is yellow-orange to red with paired follicles, each up to 2 centimetres (1 in) long.

== Distribution and habitat ==
Pleiocarpa pycnantha is native to an area of Africa from Sudan south to Mozambique and in parts of West Africa. Its habitat is evergreen forest from sea level to 1,100 metres (3,600 ft) altitude.
