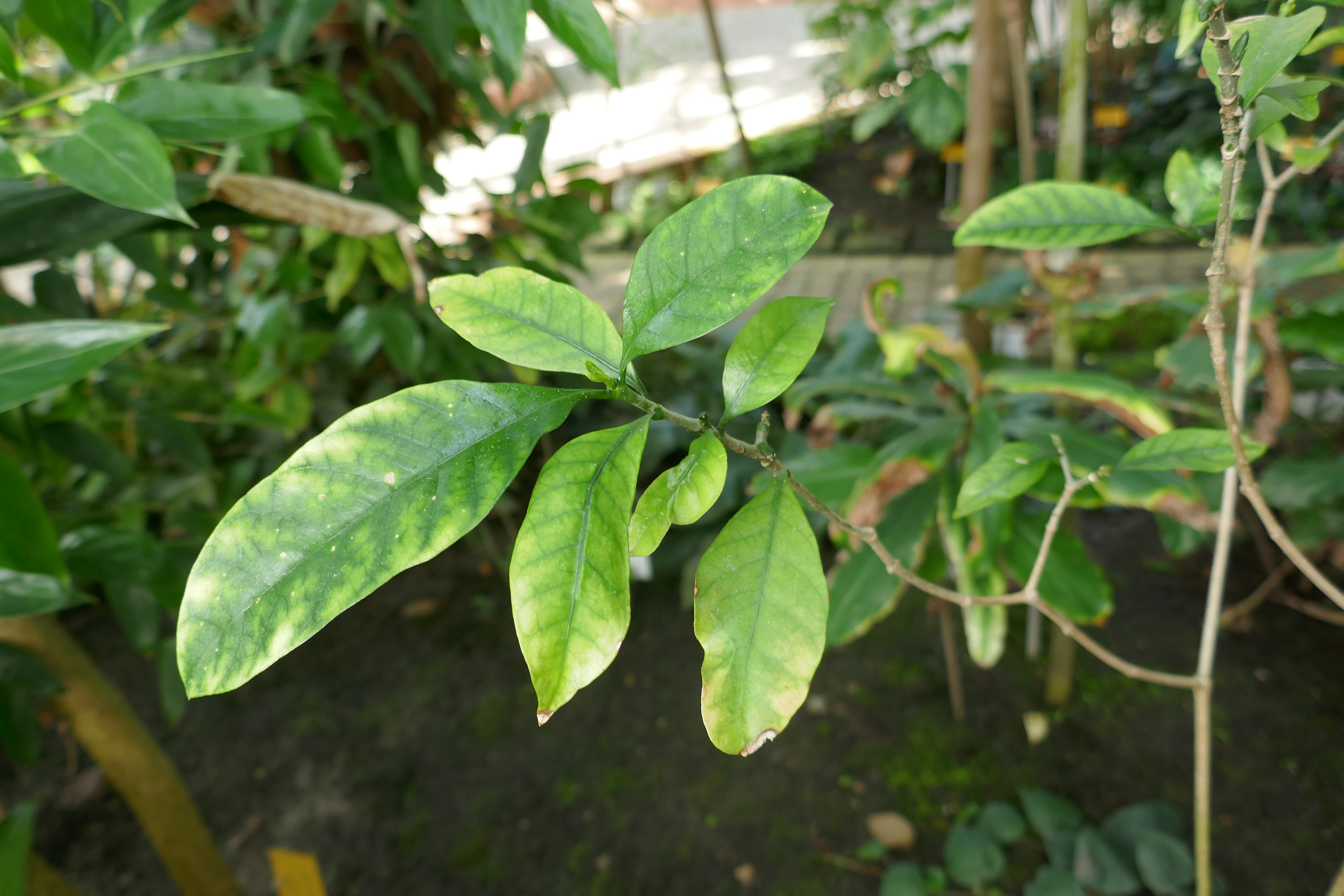

Scientific classification
- Kingdom: Plantae
- Clade: Embryophytes
- Clade: Tracheophytes
- Clade: Spermatophytes
- Clade: Angiosperms
- Clade: Eudicots
- Clade: Asterids
- Order: Gentianales
- Family: Apocynaceae
- Genus: Callichilia
- Species: C. barteri

Binomial name
- Callichilia barteri (Hook.f.) Stapf

Synonyms
- Hedranthera barteri (Hook.f.) Pichon; Tabernaemontana barteri Hook.f.

= Callichilia barteri =

Species of plant

Callichilia barteri grows as a shrub up to 3 m (10 ft) tall. Its fragrant flowers feature a white corolla. The fruit is yellow to orange with paired follicles, each up to 5 cm (2 in) long. Its habitat is in forests. Local medicinal uses include as a treatment for gonorrhoea and as an anthelmintic and childhood laxative. Callichilia barteri is native to Togo, Benin, Nigeria, Cameroon, the Republic of the Congo and the Democratic Republic of the Congo.
