= Laxoplumeria =

Scientific classification
- Kingdom: Plantae
- Clade: Tracheophytes
- Clade: Angiosperms
- Clade: Eudicots
- Clade: Asterids
- Order: Gentianales
- Family: Apocynaceae
- Subfamily: Rauvolfioideae
- Tribe: Vinceae
- Subtribe: Tonduziinae
- Genus: Laxoplumeria; Markgr.

Synonyms
- Bisquamaria Richon

Genus of flowering plants

Laxoplumeria is a genus of plants in the family Apocynaceae, first described as a genus in 1947. They are native to Panama and South America.

Species include

- Laxoplumeria aberrans J.F.Morales
- Laxoplumeria baehniana Monach.
- Laxoplumeria longipetiolata J.F.Morales
- Laxoplumeria tessmannii Markgr.
- Laxoplumeria verticillata J.F.Morales & I.L.Morais
