= Chamaeclitandra =

Scientific classification
- Kingdom: Plantae
- Clade: Tracheophytes
- Clade: Angiosperms
- Clade: Eudicots
- Clade: Asterids
- Order: Gentianales
- Family: Apocynaceae
- Subfamily: Rauvolfioideae
- Tribe: Willughbeieae
- Subtribe: Landolphiinae
- Genus: Chamaeclitandra (Stapf) Pichon
- Species: C. henriquesiana

Binomial name
- Chamaeclitandra henriquesiana (Hallier f.) Pichon

Synonyms
- Clitandra henriquesiana (Hallier f.) Stapf; Landolphia henriquesiana Hallier f.

Genus of plants

Chamaeclitandra is a genus of flowering plants in the family Apocynaceae, first described as a genus in 1953. It contains only one known species, Chamaeclitandra henriquesiana, native to tropical Africa.
