= Stephanostegia =

Scientific classification
- Kingdom: Plantae
- Clade: Tracheophytes
- Clade: Angiosperms
- Clade: Eudicots
- Clade: Asterids
- Order: Gentianales
- Family: Apocynaceae
- Subfamily: Rauvolfioideae
- Tribe: Melodineae
- Genus: Stephanostegia; Baill.

Genus of plants

Stephanostegia is a genus of plant in the family Apocynaceae first described as a genus in 1888. The entire genus is endemic to Madagascar.

Species

- Stephanostegia capuronii Markgr. - E Madagascar
- Stephanostegia hildebrandtii Baill. - N + W Madagascar
