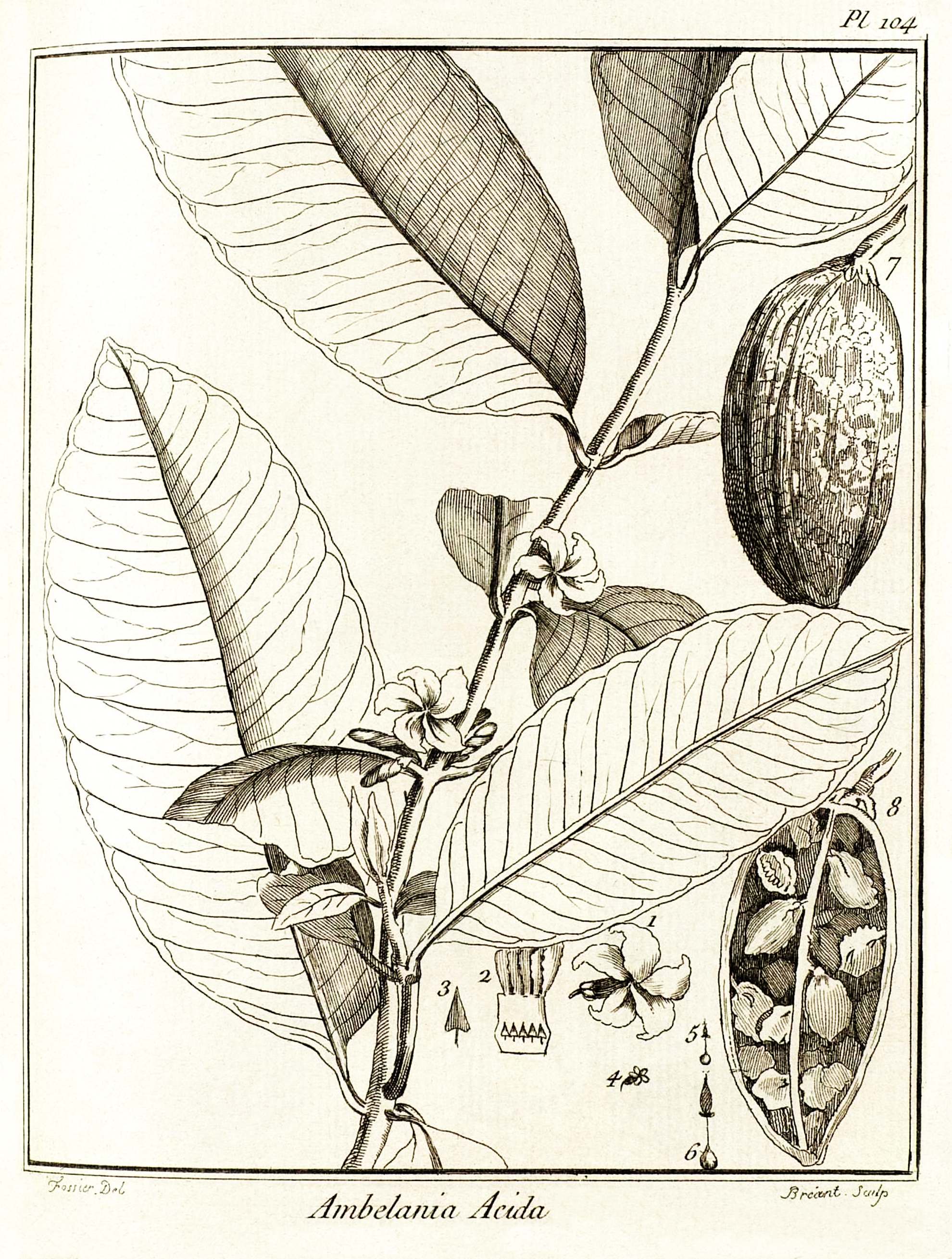
- Ambelania acida

Scientific classification
- Kingdom: Plantae
- Clade: Tracheophytes
- Clade: Angiosperms
- Clade: Eudicots
- Clade: Asterids
- Order: Gentianales
- Family: Apocynaceae
- Subfamily: Rauvolfioideae
- Tribe: Tabernaemontaneae
- Subtribe: Ambelaniinae
- Genus: Ambelania; Aubl.

= Ambelania =

Genus of flowering plants

Ambelania is a genus of flowering plants belonging to the family Apocynaceae.

Its native range is Southern Tropical America.

Species:

- Ambelania acida Aubl.
- Ambelania duckei Markgr.
- Ambelania occidentalis Zarucchi
