= Strempeliopsis =

Scientific classification
- Kingdom: Plantae
- Clade: Tracheophytes
- Clade: Angiosperms
- Clade: Eudicots
- Clade: Asterids
- Order: Gentianales
- Family: Apocynaceae
- Subfamily: Rauvolfioideae
- Tribe: Aspidospermateae
- Genus: Strempeliopsis; Benth.

Genus of plants

Strempeliopsis is a genus of plant in family Apocynaceae, first described as a genus in 1876. The entire genus is known only from the West Indies, islands of Cuba and Jamaica.

Species

- Strempeliopsis arborea Urb. - W Jamaica
- Strempeliopsis strempelioides (Griseb.) Benth. ex B.D.Jacks. - Cuba
