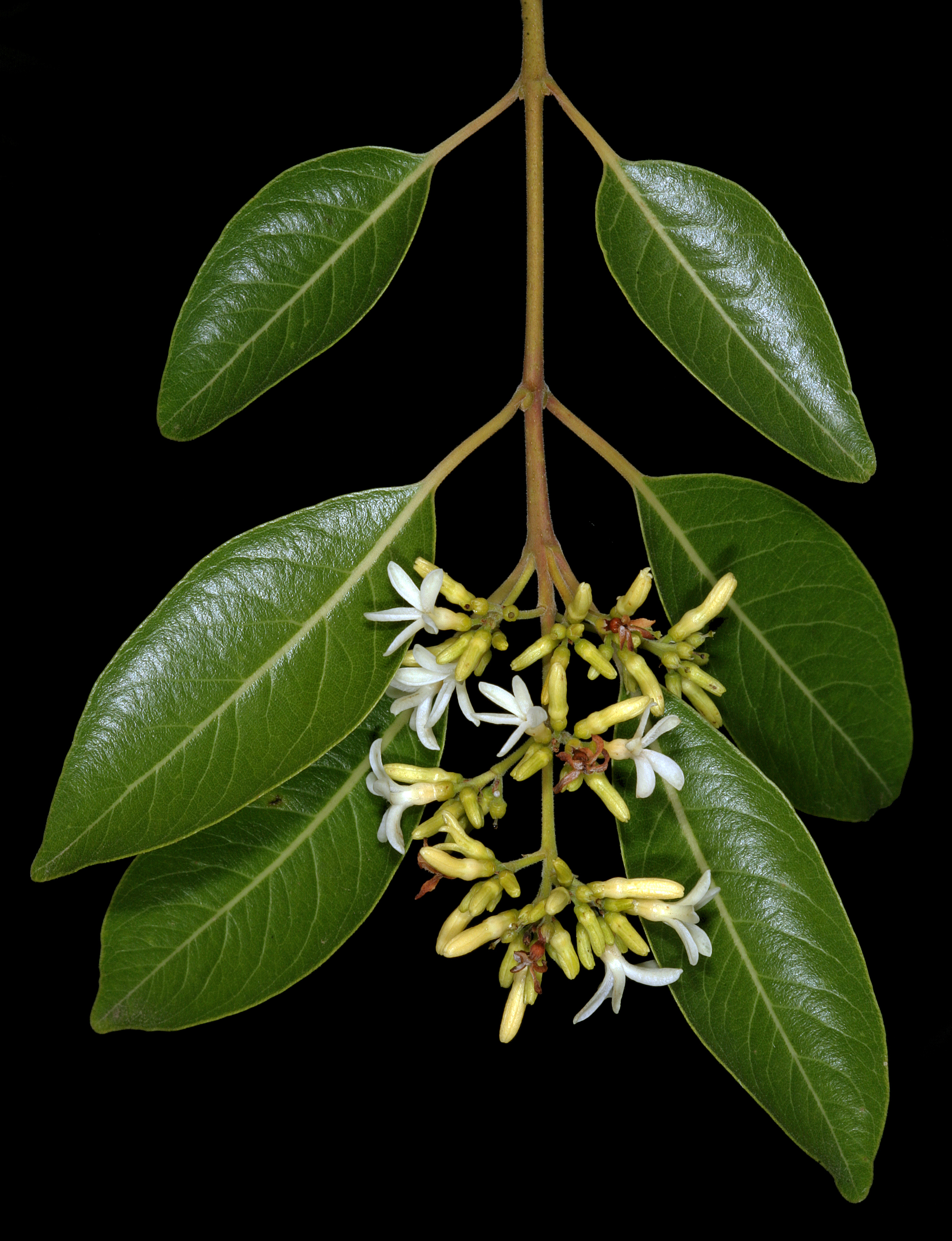

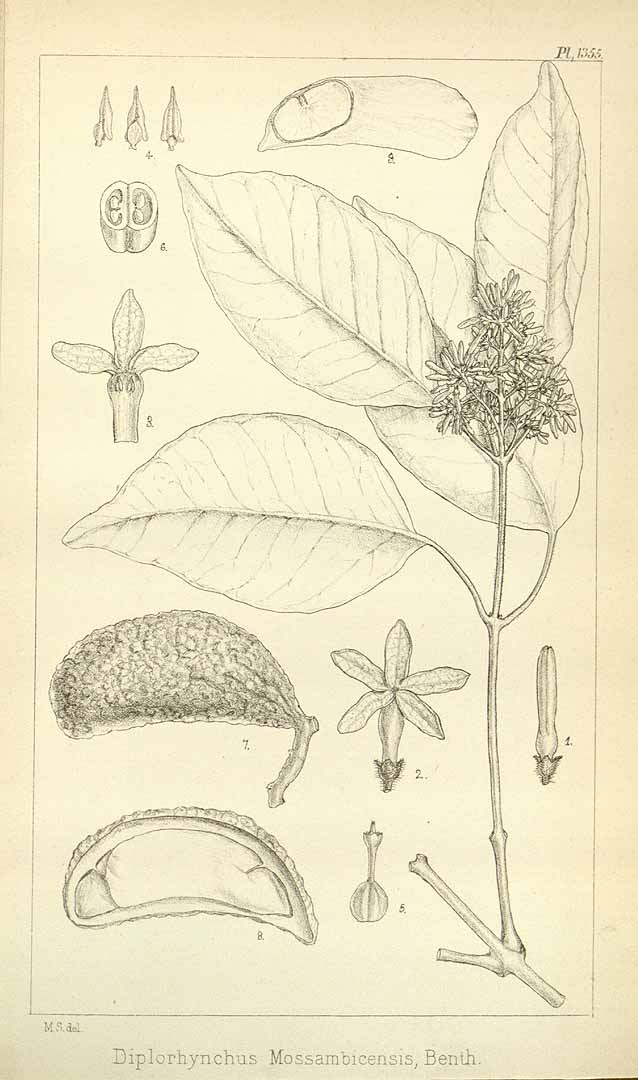

Conservation status
- Least Concern (IUCN 3.1)

Scientific classification
- Kingdom: Plantae
- Clade: Embryophytes
- Clade: Tracheophytes
- Clade: Spermatophytes
- Clade: Angiosperms
- Clade: Eudicots
- Clade: Asterids
- Order: Gentianales
- Family: Apocynaceae
- Subfamily: Rauvolfioideae
- Tribe: Melodineae
- Genus: Diplorhynchus; Welw. ex Ficalho & Hiern
- Species: D. condylocarpon

Binomial name
- Diplorhynchus condylocarpon (Müll.Arg.) Pichon

Synonyms
- Aspidosperma condylocarpon Müll.Arg.; Diplorhynchus angolensis Büttner; Diplorhynchus angustifolia Stapf; Diplorhynchus mossambicensis Benth.; Diplorhynchus poggei K.Schum; Diplorhynchus psilopus Welw. ex Ficalho & Hiern; Diplorhynchus welwitschii Rolfe; Neurolobium cymosum Baill.

= Diplorhynchus =

Genus of plants

Diplorhynchus is a monotypic genus of plant in the family Apocynaceae native to tropical and southern Africa. As of August 2020, Plants of the World Online recognises the single species Diplorhynchus condylocarpon.

== Description ==
Diplorhynchus condylocarpon grows as a shrub or small tree up to 20 m (70 ft) tall, with a trunk diameter of up to 2 m (7 ft). Its fragrant flowers feature a white to creamy corolla. Fruit is green or brown with paired follicles, each up to 6.5 cm (2.6 in) long. Vernacular names for the plant include "horn-pod tree" and "wild rubber". The species' local traditional medicinal uses include as a treatment for indigestion, diarrhoea, fever, snakebite, infertility, venereal disease, diabetes, pneumonia and tuberculosis.

== Distribution and habitat ==
Diplorhynchus condylocarpon is native to an area from southern parts of the Republic of the Congo to the north of Namibia in the west and large parts of northern South Africa in the southeast. Its habitat is dry woodland and hillsides from sea level to 1,700 m (5,600 ft) altitude.
