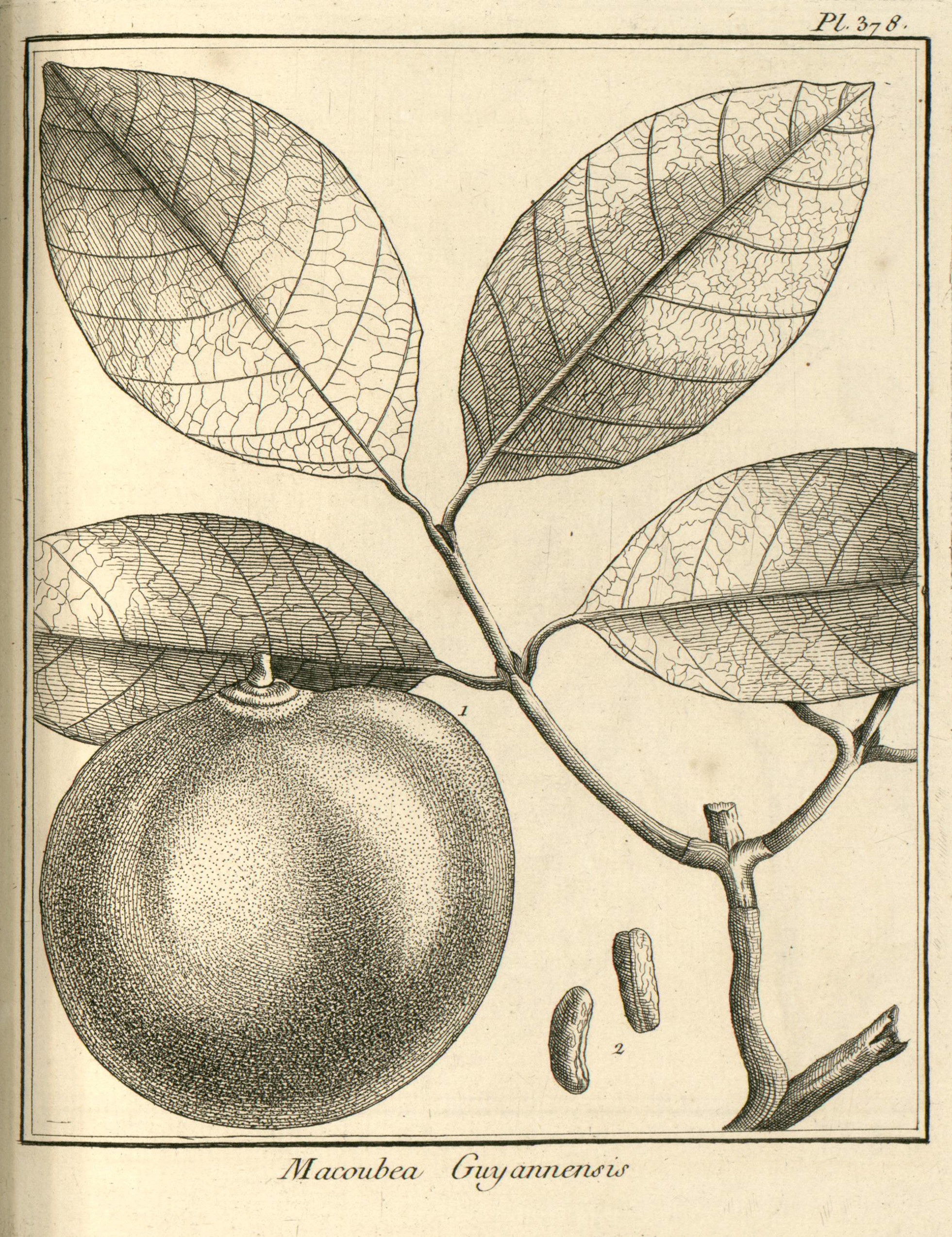
- Macoubea guianensis

Scientific classification
- Kingdom: Plantae
- Clade: Tracheophytes
- Clade: Angiosperms
- Clade: Eudicots
- Clade: Asterids
- Order: Gentianales
- Family: Apocynaceae
- Subfamily: Rauvolfioideae
- Tribe: Tabernaemontaneae
- Subtribe: Ambelaniinae
- Genus: Macoubea; Aubl.

Synonyms
- Macubea J.St.-Hil.

= Macoubea =

Genus of plants

Macoubea is a genus of plant in the family Apocynaceae first described as a genus in 1775. It is native to South America and Central America.

Species

- Macoubea guianensis Aubl. - Venezuela, Colombia, Peru, N Brazil, the 3 Guianas
- Macoubea mesoamericana J.F.Morales - Costa Rica, Panama
- Macoubea sprucei (Müll.Arg.) Markgr. - Costa Rica, Panama, Venezuela, Colombia, Peru, NW Brazil

formerly included

- Macoubea fasciculata (Poir.) Lemée = Parahancornia fasciculata (Poir.) Benoist
