= Strempeliopsis arborea =

Conservation status
- Vulnerable (IUCN 3.1)

Scientific classification
- Kingdom: Plantae
- Clade: Tracheophytes
- Clade: Angiosperms
- Clade: Eudicots
- Clade: Asterids
- Order: Gentianales
- Family: Apocynaceae
- Genus: Strempeliopsis
- Species: S. arborea

Binomial name
- Strempeliopsis arborea Urb.

Species of plant

Strempeliopsis arborea is a species of plant in the family Apocynaceae. It is endemic to Jamaica.
