= Cylindropsis =

Scientific classification
- Kingdom: Plantae
- Clade: Embryophytes
- Clade: Tracheophytes
- Clade: Spermatophytes
- Clade: Angiosperms
- Clade: Eudicots
- Clade: Asterids
- Order: Gentianales
- Family: Apocynaceae
- Subfamily: Rauvolfioideae
- Tribe: Willughbeieae
- Subtribe: Landolphiinae
- Genus: Cylindropsis; Pierre
- Species: C. parvifolia

Binomial name
- Cylindropsis parvifolia Pierre

Synonyms
- Clitandra parvifolia (Pierre) Stapf; Clitandra talbotii Wernham

Genus of plants

Cylindropsis is a genus of plants first described in 1898. It contains only one known species, Cylindropsis parvifolia, native to central Africa (Nigeria, Cabinda, Gabon, Central African Republic, Republic of Congo, Democratic Republic of the Congo).

formerly included

- Cylindropsis novoguineensis (Wernham) S.Moore ex Markgr. = Melodinus australis (F.Muell.) Pierre
- Cylindropsis togolana Hallier f. = Landolphia togolana (Hallier f.) Pichon
- Cylindropsis watsoniana (Rombouts) Hallier f = Landolphia watsoniana Rombouts
