= Lepiniopsis =

Scientific classification
- Kingdom: Plantae
- Clade: Tracheophytes
- Clade: Angiosperms
- Clade: Eudicots
- Clade: Asterids
- Order: Gentianales
- Family: Apocynaceae
- Subfamily: Rauvolfioideae
- Tribe: Alyxieae
- Subtribe: Alyxiinae
- Genus: Lepiniopsis; Valeton

Genus of plants

Lepiniopsis is a genus of plants in the family Apocynaceae first described as a genus in 1895. It is native to various islands in Southeast Asia and in the Pacific Ocean.

Species

- Lepiniopsis ternatensis Valeton - New Guinea, Bismarck Archipelago, Philippines, Maluku, Sulawesi
- Lepiniopsis trilocularis Markgr. - Palau in Micronesia
