= Orthopichonia =

Scientific classification
- Kingdom: Plantae
- Clade: Tracheophytes
- Clade: Angiosperms
- Clade: Eudicots
- Clade: Asterids
- Order: Gentianales
- Family: Apocynaceae
- Subfamily: Rauvolfioideae
- Tribe: Willughbeieae
- Subtribe: Landolphiinae
- Genus: Orthopichonia; H.Huber 1962

Synonyms
- Orthandra (Pichon) Pichon 1953 not Burret 1940

Genus of plants

Orthopichonia is a genus of plants in the family Apocynaceae, first described as a genus in 1953. It was initially given the name Orthandra, but this turned out to be an illegitimate homonym (in other words, the same name had already been used for a different plant). Orthopichonia is native to Africa.

Species

- Orthopichonia barteri (Stapf) H.Huber – Ivory Coast, Nigeria, Cameroon, Gabon, Central African Republic, Republic of Congo, Zaire
- Orthopichonia cirrhosa (Radlk.) H.Huber – Nigeria, Cameroon, Gabon, Central African Republic, Republic of Congo, Zaire, Angolan Province of Cabinda
- Orthopichonia indeniensis (A.Chev.) H.Huber – Ivory Coast, Nigeria, Liberia, Cameroon
- Orthopichonia schweinfurthii (Stapf) H.Huber – Cameroon, Central African Republic, Republic of Congo, Zaire, South Sudan
- Orthopichonia seretii (De Wild.) Vonk – Cameroon, Gabon, Central African Republic, Zaire
- Orthopichonia visciflua (K.Schum. ex Hallier f.) Vonk – Cameroon, Gabon
