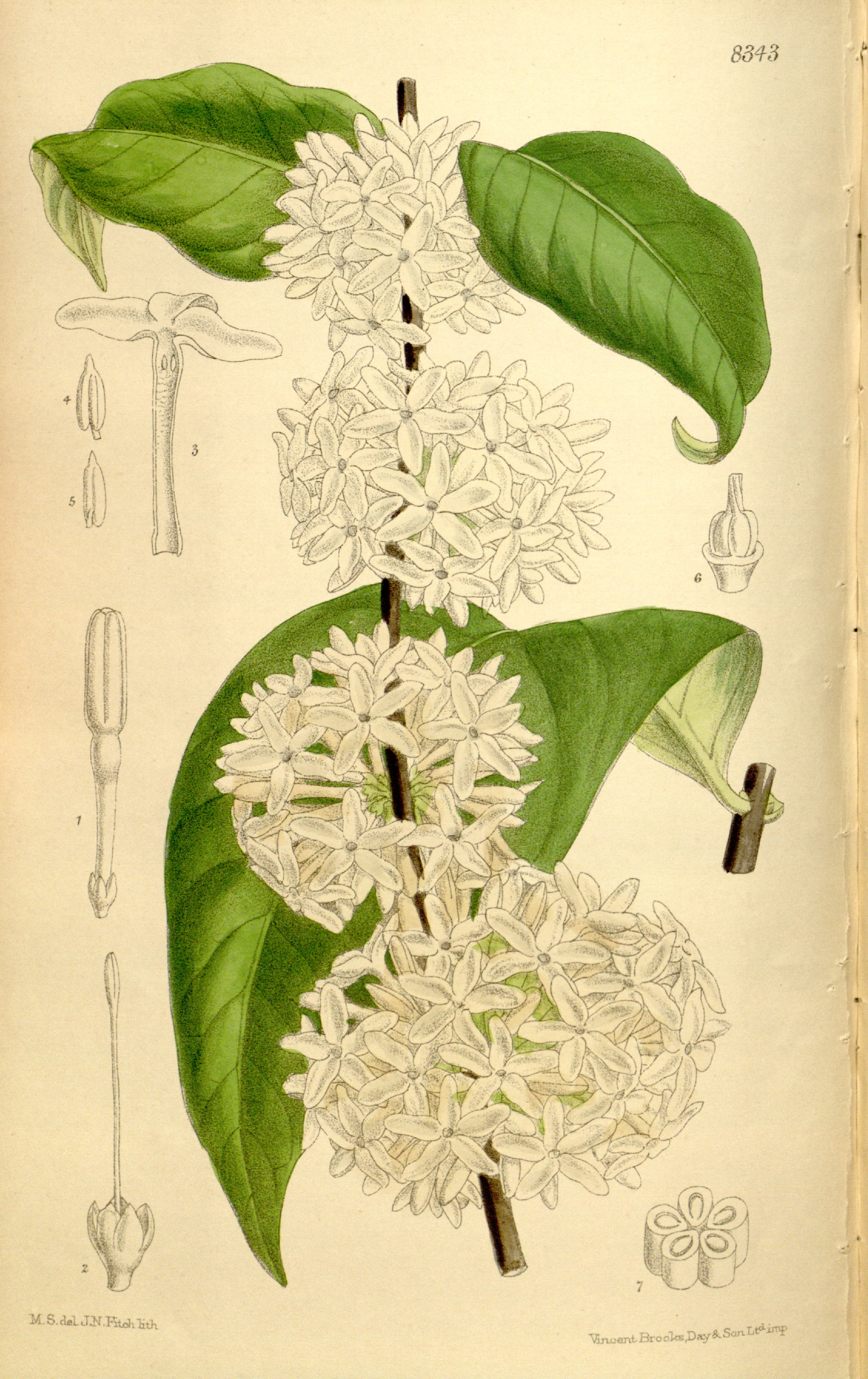
- Pleiocarpa mutica

Scientific classification
- Kingdom: Plantae
- Clade: Tracheophytes
- Clade: Angiosperms
- Clade: Eudicots
- Clade: Asterids
- Order: Gentianales
- Family: Apocynaceae
- Subfamily: Rauvolfioideae
- Tribe: Hunterieae
- Genus: Pleiocarpa; Benth.

Synonyms
- Carpodinopsis Pichon

= Pleiocarpa =

Genus of flowering plants

Pleiocarpa is a genus of plant in the family Apocynaceae first described as a genus in 1876. It is native to tropical Africa from Senegal to Tanzania and south to Zimbabwe. As of August 2013 the World Checklist of Selected Plant Families recognises 6 species:

Species

1. Pleiocarpa bicarpellata Stapf - Cabinda, Cameroon, Republic of the Congo, Gabon, Democratic Republic of the Congo, Kenya
2. Pleiocarpa brevistyla Omino - Gabon
3. Pleiocarpa mutica Benth. - Ghana, Ivory Coast, Liberia, Sierra Leone, Nigeria, Cameroon, Gabon, Central African Republic, Republic of the Congo
4. Pleiocarpa picralimoides (Pichon) Omino - Cabinda, Republic of the Congo, Gabon
5. Pleiocarpa pycnantha (K.Schum) Stapf - widespread across most of tropical Africa
6. Pleiocarpa rostrata Benth. - Nigeria, Cameroon, Gabon

formerly included in genus

1. Pleiocarpa camerunensis (K.Schum. ex Hallier f.) Stapf = Hunteria camerunensis K.Schum. ex Hallier f.
2. Pleiocarpa hockii De Wild. - Acokanthera oppositifolia (Lam.) Codd
3. Pleiocarpa simii (Stapf) Stapf ex Hutch. & Dalziel = Hunteria simii (Stapf) H.Huber
