= Schizozygia =

Conservation status
- Least Concern (IUCN 3.1)

Scientific classification
- Kingdom: Plantae
- Clade: Tracheophytes
- Clade: Angiosperms
- Clade: Eudicots
- Clade: Asterids
- Order: Gentianales
- Family: Apocynaceae
- Subfamily: Rauvolfioideae
- Tribe: Tabernaemontaneae
- Subtribe: Tabernaemontaninae
- Genus: Schizozygia; Baill.
- Species: S. coffaeoides

Binomial name
- Schizozygia coffaeoides Baill.

Genus of plants

Schizozygia is a monotypic genus of plant in the family Apocynaceae found in tropical Africa and the Comoros. As of July 2020, Plants of the World Online recognises the single species Schizozygia coffaeoides.

Schizozygia coffaeoides grows as a shrub or small tree up to 8 metres (26 ft) tall. Its fragrant flowers feature a creamy-yellow corolla. Fruit is yellow to orange with paired ellipsoid follicles, each up to 1.5 centimetres (0.59 in) long. Its habitat is forests from sea level to 1,500 metres (4,900 ft) altitude. Local medicinal uses include as a treatment for eye inflammation, sores and ringworm-infected skin. Schizozygia coffaeoides is native to the Democratic Republic of the Congo, Somalia, Kenya, Tanzania, Angola, Malawi and the Comoros.
