= Mucoa =

Scientific classification
- Kingdom: Plantae
- Clade: Tracheophytes
- Clade: Angiosperms
- Clade: Eudicots
- Clade: Asterids
- Order: Gentianales
- Family: Apocynaceae
- Subfamily: Rauvolfioideae
- Tribe: Tabernaemontaneae
- Subtribe: Ambelaniinae
- Genus: Mucoa; Zarucchi

Genus of plants

Mucoa is a genus of plant in the family Apocynaceae first described as a genus in 1988. It is native to northern South America.

Species

- Mucoa duckei (Markgr.) Zarucchi - Colombia, Peru, N Brazil
- Mucoa pantchenkoana (Markgr.) Zarucchi - Bolívar in Venezuela, Roraima in Brazil
