= Callichilia monopodialis =

Conservation status
- Vulnerable (IUCN 3.1)

Scientific classification
- Kingdom: Plantae
- Clade: Tracheophytes
- Clade: Angiosperms
- Clade: Eudicots
- Clade: Asterids
- Order: Gentianales
- Family: Apocynaceae
- Genus: Callichilia
- Species: C. monopodialis

Binomial name
- Callichilia monopodialis (K.Schum.) Stapf

Synonyms
- Tabernaemontana monopodialis K.Schum.

Species of plant

Callichilia monopodialis is a plant in the dogbane family Apocynaceae.

== Description ==
Callichilia monopodialis grows as a shrub up to 2 metres (7 ft) tall. It has white flowers.

== Distribution and habitat ==
Callichilia monopodialis is endemic to Cameroon. Its habitat is lowland to submontane forests, at altitudes from 200–950 m (1,000–3,000 ft).

== Conservation ==
Callichilia monopodialis has been assessed as Vulnerable on the IUCN Red List. The species is broadly threatened by slash-and-burn agriculture and by urban expansion near Yaoundé.
