= Pteralyxia laurifolia =

Conservation status
- Vulnerable (IUCN 2.3)

Scientific classification
- Kingdom: Plantae
- Clade: Tracheophytes
- Clade: Angiosperms
- Clade: Eudicots
- Clade: Asterids
- Order: Gentianales
- Family: Apocynaceae
- Genus: Pteralyxia
- Species: P. laurifolia

Binomial name
- Pteralyxia laurifolia (G.Lodd.) Leeuwenb.

Synonyms
- Cerbera laurifolia G.Lodd.; Tanghinia laurifolia (G.Lodd.) G.Don; Vallesia macrocarpa Hillebr.; Pteralyxia macrocarpa (Hillebr.) K.Schum.; Pteralyxia caumiana O.Deg.; Alyxia robusta Pichon

Species of plant

Pteralyxia laurifolia, the ridged pteralyxia, is a species of plant in the family Apocynaceae. It is endemic to the Island of Oahu in the Hawaiian Islands. The species is listed as vulnerable, threatened by habitat loss.
