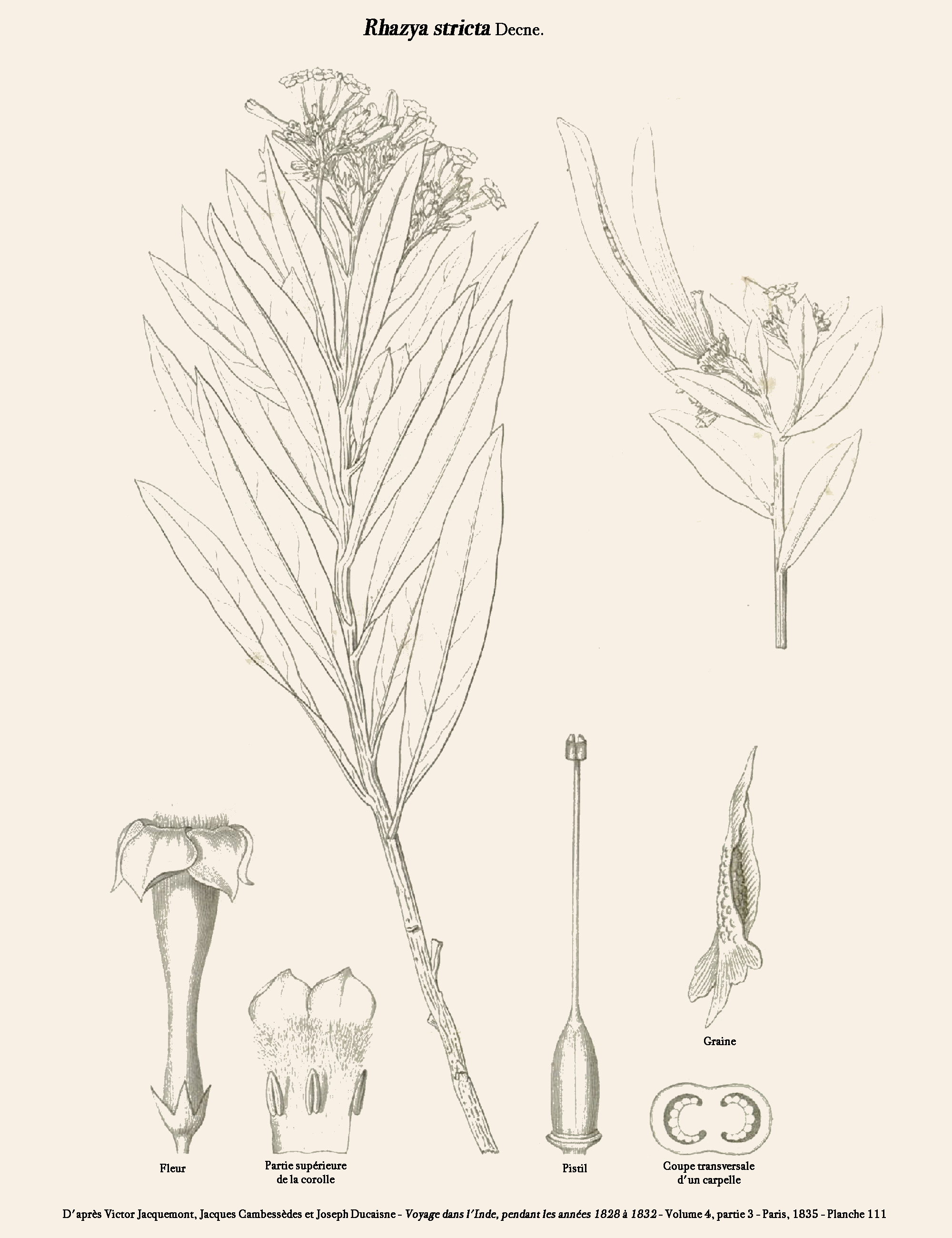
- Rhazya stricta

Scientific classification
- Kingdom: Plantae
- Clade: Tracheophytes
- Clade: Angiosperms
- Clade: Eudicots
- Clade: Asterids
- Order: Gentianales
- Family: Apocynaceae
- Genus: Rhazya
- Species: R. stricta

Binomial name
- Rhazya stricta Decne.

= Rhazya stricta =

Species of plant

Rhazya stricta (Persian: اشورک Eshvarak) is a native poisonous plant in Southern Iran, Afghanistan, Pakistan, India, Iraq, Oman, Yemen, and Saudi Arabia. The plant is an evergreen dwarf shrub of the family Apocynaceae.
