= Craspidospermum =

Conservation status
- Least Concern (IUCN 3.1)

Scientific classification
- Kingdom: Plantae
- Clade: Embryophytes
- Clade: Tracheophytes
- Clade: Angiosperms
- Clade: Eudicots
- Clade: Asterids
- Order: Gentianales
- Family: Apocynaceae
- Subfamily: Rauvolfioideae
- Tribe: Melodineae
- Genus: Craspidospermum; Bojer ex A.DC.
- Species: C. verticillatum

Binomial name
- Craspidospermum verticillatum Bojer ex Decne.

Synonyms
- Cerbera obovata Roem. & Schult.

Genus of flowering plants

Craspidospermum is a monotypic genus of plant in the family Apocynaceae, endemic to Madagascar. As of July 2026, Plants of the World Online recognised the single species Craspidospermum verticillatum.

== Description ==
Craspidospermum verticillatum grows as a tree up to 25 m (80 ft) tall, with a trunk diameter of up to 50 cm (20 in). Its flowers feature a white or pale pink corolla, with pink or dark red throat.

== Range and habitat ==
Craspidospermum verticillatum ranges across the east, southeast, and center of Madagascar. Its natural habitat is humid and subhumid lowland rainforest and montane forest, and sometimes rocky areas, from sea-level to 1,800 m (6,000 ft) elevation.

The tree is widespread in the island's humid and subhumid forests. It is threatened with habitat loss from deforestation for timber, firewood, and to clear land for agriculture and mining, and its population is declining.

== Uses ==
Local medicinal uses of Craspidospermum verticillatum include as a treatment for pulmonary diseases and syphilis.
