= Microplumeria =

Scientific classification
- Kingdom: Plantae
- Clade: Tracheophytes
- Clade: Angiosperms
- Clade: Eudicots
- Clade: Asterids
- Order: Gentianales
- Family: Apocynaceae
- Subfamily: Rauvolfioideae
- Tribe: Aspidospermateae
- Genus: Microplumeria; Baill.
- Species: M. anomala

Binomial name
- Microplumeria anomala (Müll.Arg.) Markgr.

Synonyms
- Cylindrosperma Ducke; Aspidosperma anomalum Müll.Arg.; Cylindrosperma anomalum (Müll.Arg.) Ducke; Microplumeria sprucei Baill.; Aspidosperma sessilis Huber

Genus of plants

Microplumeria is a genus of flowering plants in the family Apocynaceae, first described as a genus in 1889. It contains only one known species, Microplumeria anomala, native to the Amazon Basin of Venezuela, Colombia, and Brazil.
