= Pteralyxia =

Scientific classification
- Kingdom: Plantae
- Clade: Tracheophytes
- Clade: Angiosperms
- Clade: Eudicots
- Clade: Asterids
- Order: Gentianales
- Family: Apocynaceae
- Subfamily: Rauvolfioideae
- Tribe: Alyxieae
- Subtribe: Alyxiinae
- Genus: Pteralyxia; K.Schum. 1895

Genus of plants

Pteralyxia is a genus of plants in the family Apocynaceae, first described as a genus in 1895. The entire genus is endemic to the Hawaiian Islands.

Species

- Pteralyxia kauaiensis Caum (syn P. elliptica) - Kauai
- Pteralyxia laurifolia (G.Lodd.) Leeuwenb. (syn P. macrocarpa, P. caumiana) - Oahu
