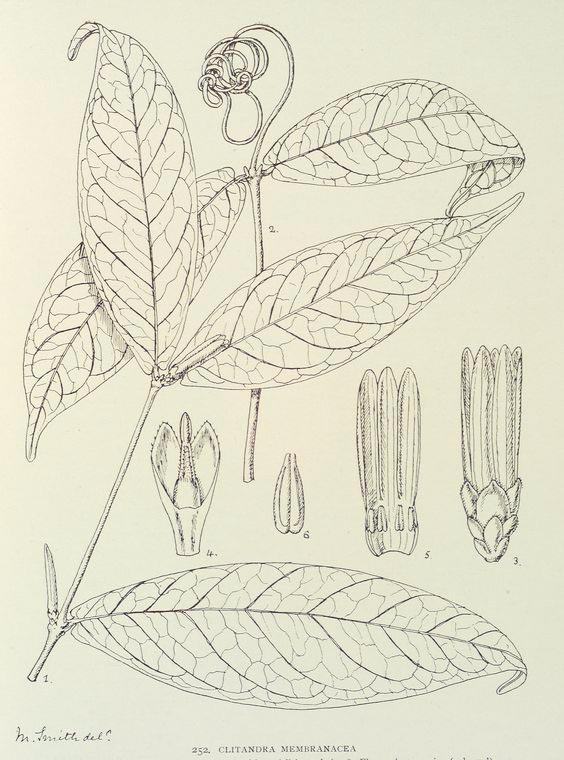

Scientific classification
- Kingdom: Plantae
- Clade: Embryophytes
- Clade: Tracheophytes
- Clade: Spermatophytes
- Clade: Angiosperms
- Clade: Eudicots
- Clade: Asterids
- Order: Gentianales
- Family: Apocynaceae
- Subfamily: Rauvolfioideae
- Tribe: Willughbeieae
- Subtribe: Landolphiinae
- Genus: Clitandra; Benth.
- Species: C. cymulosa

Binomial name
- Clitandra cymulosa Benth.

Synonyms
- Pacouria cymulosa (Benth.) Roberty; Clitandra orientalis K.Schum.; Clitandra gilletii De Wild.; Clitandra arnoldiana De Wild.; Clitandra nzunde De Wild.; Clitandra elastica A.Chev.

= Clitandra =

Genus of plants

Clitandra is a genus of flowering plants in the family Apocynaceae, first described as a genus in 1849. A total of 46 names have been coined since that time for species, subspecies, and varieties within the genus, but most of them have been transferred to other genera. The genus is currently regarded as containing only one species, Clitandra cymulosa, native to tropical Africa (from Sierra Leone to Tanzania, south to Angola).
