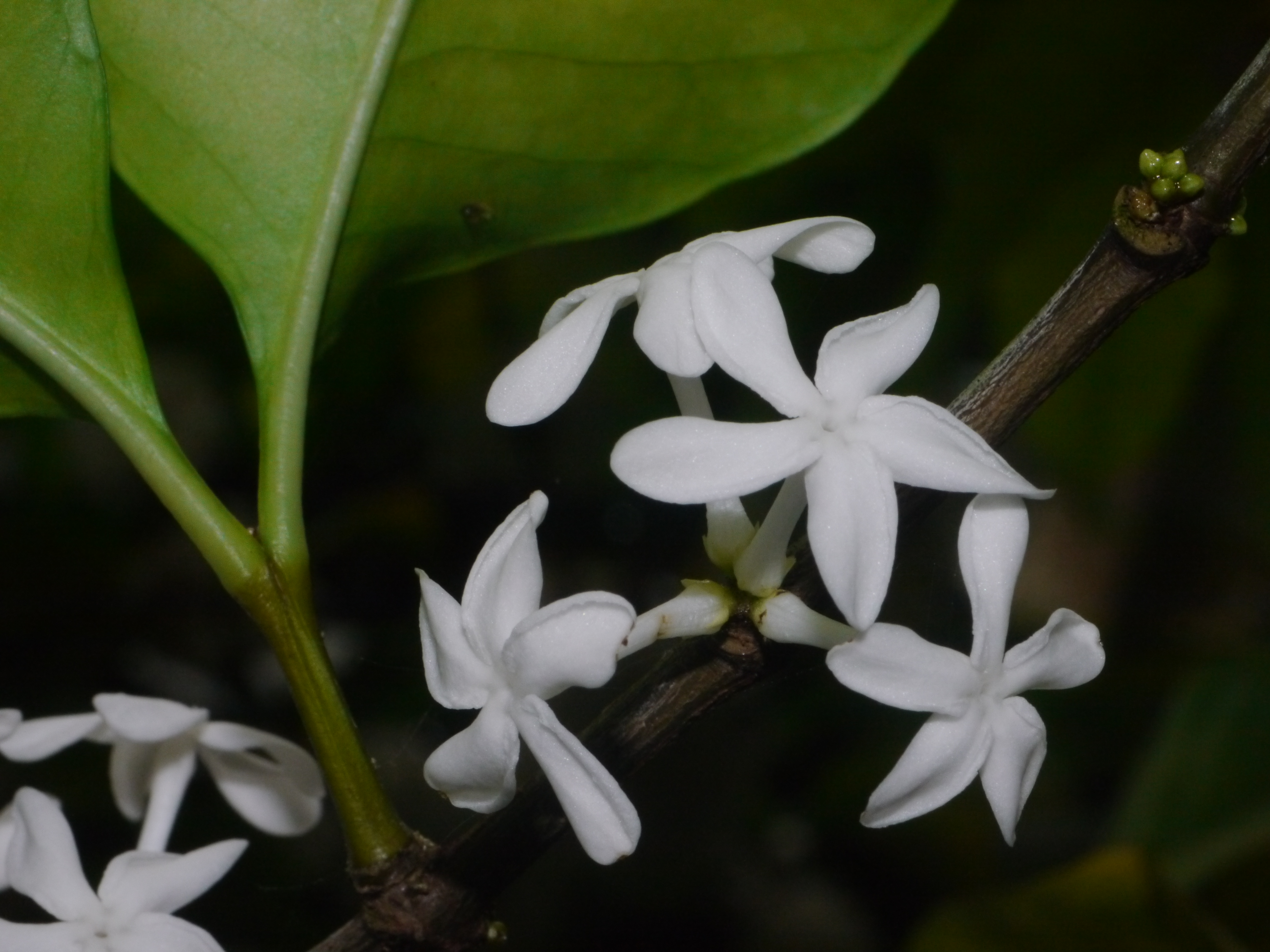

Conservation status
- Least Concern (IUCN 3.1)

Scientific classification
- Kingdom: Plantae
- Clade: Tracheophytes
- Clade: Angiosperms
- Clade: Eudicots
- Clade: Asterids
- Order: Gentianales
- Family: Apocynaceae
- Genus: Pleiocarpa
- Species: P. mutica

Binomial name
- Pleiocarpa mutica Benth.

Synonyms
- Hunteria pleiocarpa Hallier f.; Pleiocarpa bakueana A.Chev.; Pleiocarpa salicifolia Stapf; Pleiocarpa ternata A.Chev.; Pleiocarpa tricarpellata Stapf

= Pleiocarpa mutica =

Species of plant in the family Apocynaceae

Pleiocarpa mutica is a plant in the family Apocynaceae.

== Description ==
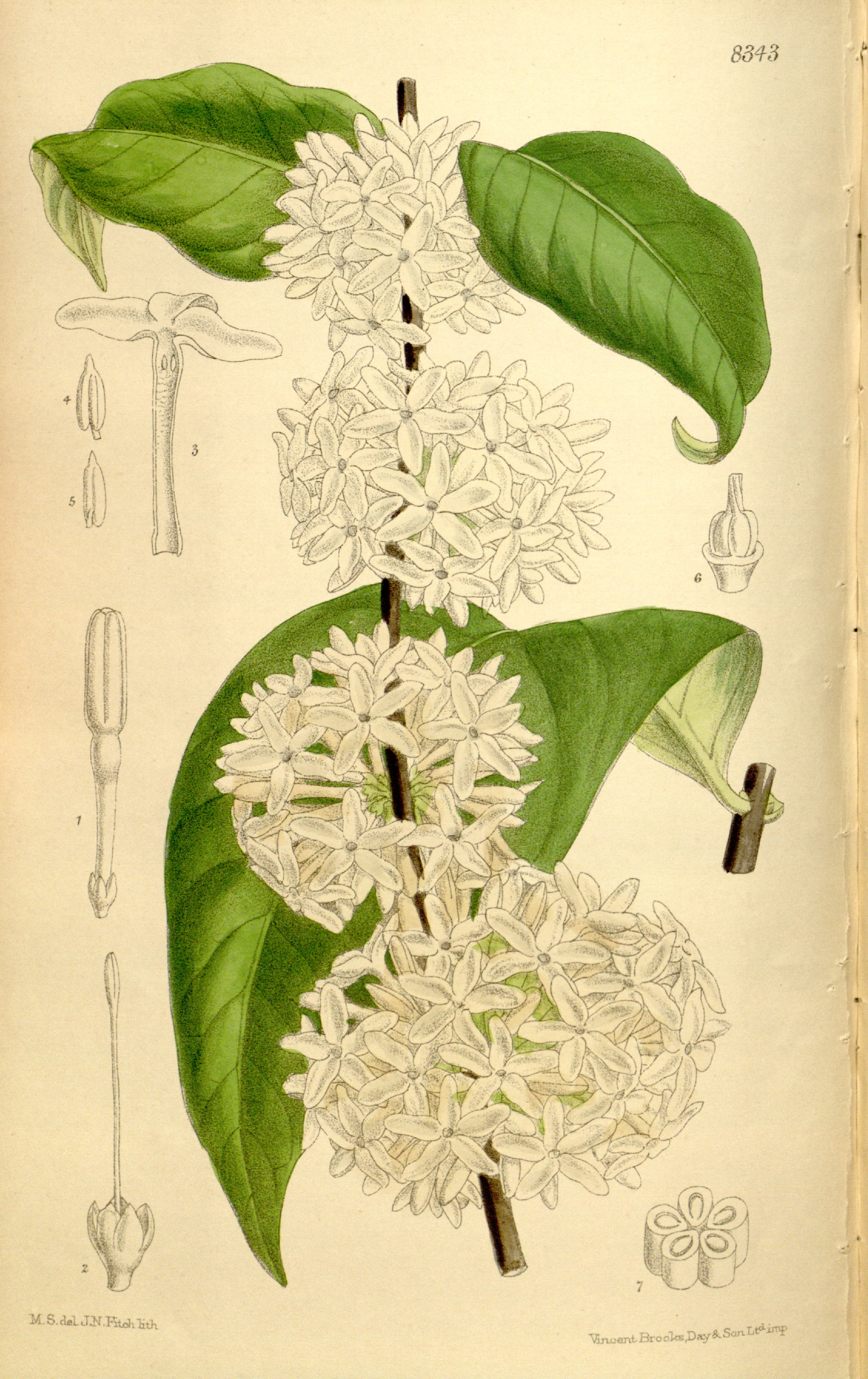
Botanical illustration, 1910

Pleiocarpa mutica grows as a shrub or small tree up to 7.5 metres (25 ft) tall, with a stem diameter of up to 5 cm (2 in). Its fragrant flowers feature a white corolla. The fruit is yellow to bright orange with paired follicles, each up to 2 cm (1 in) long. Local medicinal uses include as a treatment for stomach-ache, kidney diseases, malaria, jaundice and as a laxative.

== Distribution and habitat ==
Pleiocarpa mutica is native to an area of tropical Africa from Sierra Leone east to the Central African Republic. The species is found in a variety of habitats from sea-level to 600 metres (2,000 ft) altitude.

== Phytochemistry ==
The alkaloid kopsinine, which has in vitro anticholinergic activity, has been isolated from Pleiocarpa mutica.
