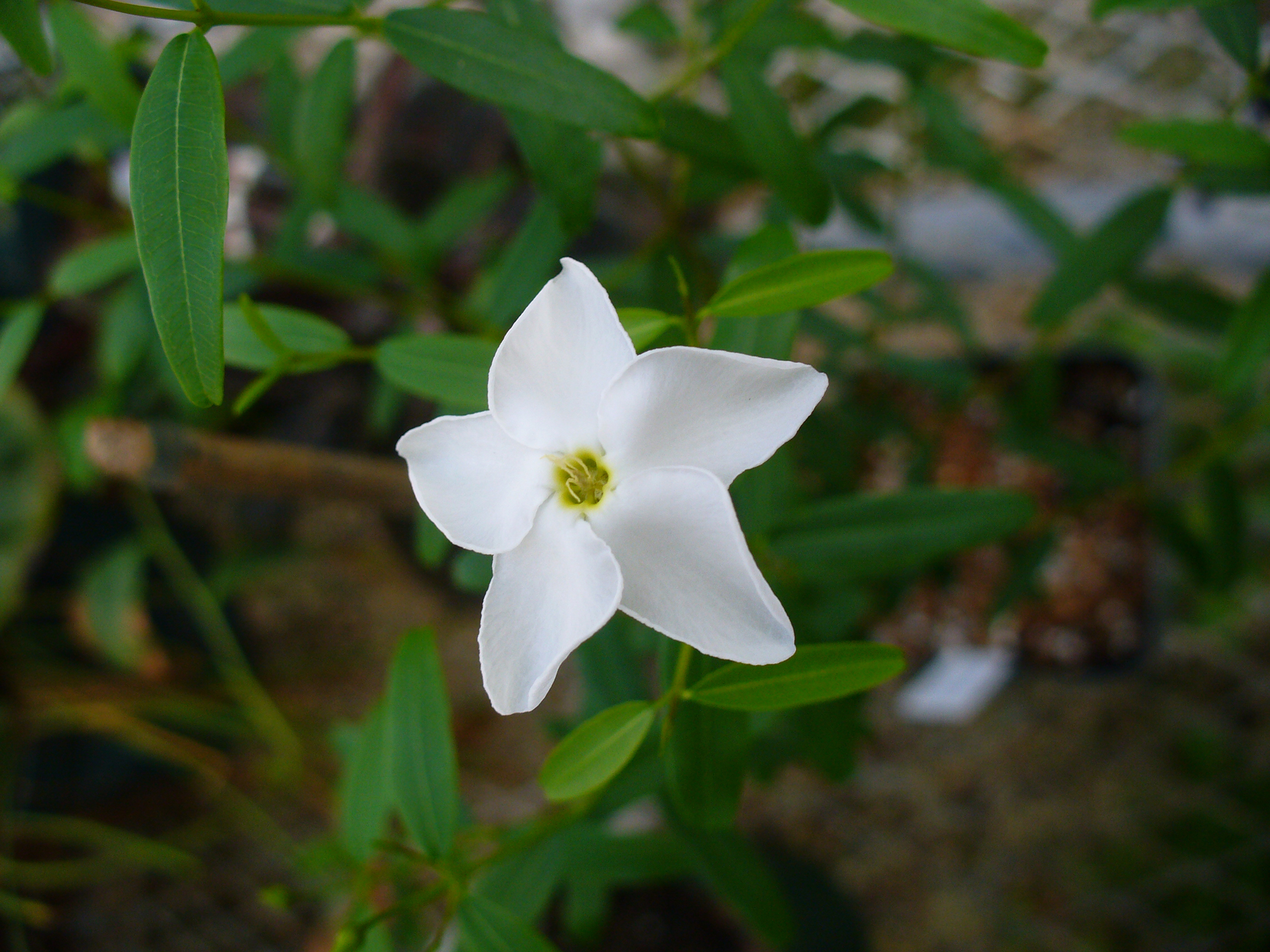
- Cameraria latifolia

Scientific classification
- Kingdom: Plantae
- Clade: Tracheophytes
- Clade: Angiosperms
- Clade: Eudicots
- Clade: Asterids
- Order: Gentianales
- Family: Apocynaceae
- Tribe: Plumerieae
- Genus: Cameraria; L.

Type species
- Cameraria latifolia L.

= Cameraria (plant) =

Genus of plants

Cameraria is a genus of plants in family Apocynaceae, first described for modern science by Linnaeus in 1753. It is native to southern Mexico, Central America, and the West Indies.

== Species ==
Cameraria includes:

1. Cameraria angustifolia L. - Dominican Republic
2. Cameraria latifolia L. - Tabasco, Yucatán Peninsula, Belize, Guatemala, Cuba, Hispaniola, Jamaica - type species - naturalized in Guangdong Province in China
3. Cameraria linearifolia Urb. & Ekman - Hispaniola
4. Cameraria microphylla Britton - Camagüey Province in Cuba
5. Cameraria obovalis Alain - Cerro de Miraflores in Cuba
6. Cameraria orientensis Bisse - E Cuba
7. Cameraria retusa Griseb. - Cuba
