= Haplophyton crooksii =

Scientific classification
- Kingdom: Plantae
- Clade: Tracheophytes
- Clade: Angiosperms
- Clade: Eudicots
- Clade: Asterids
- Order: Gentianales
- Family: Apocynaceae
- Genus: Haplophyton
- Species: H. crooksii

Binomial name
- Haplophyton crooksii (L.D. Benson) L.D. Benson

Synonyms
- Haplophyton cimicidum var. crooksii L.D. Benson

Species of plant

Haplophyton crooksii is a plant species native to Arizona, New Mexico, Texas, and northern Mexico. It is an herb up to 60 cm tall, with showy yellow flowers, found on rocky slopes in desert scrub and desert grassland.

The plant is commonly called the cockroach plant (or hierba de la cucaracha) because of its insecticidal properties.
