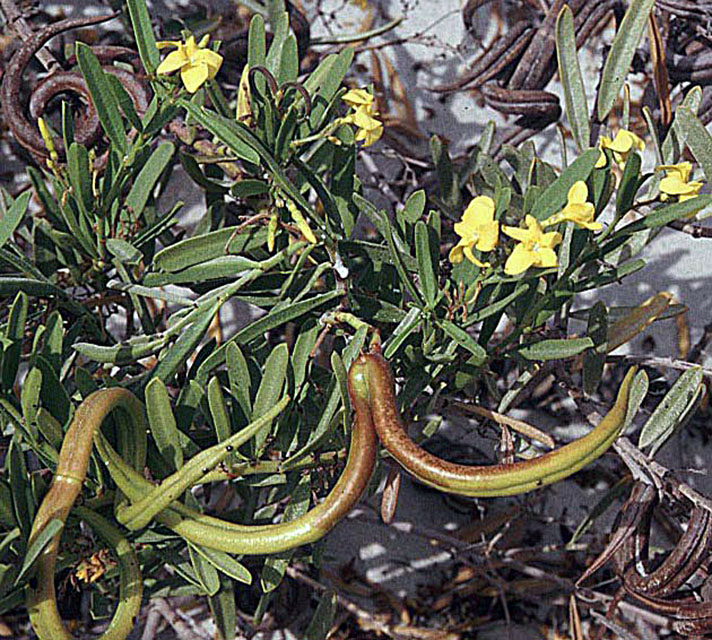
- Skytanthus acutus

Scientific classification
- Kingdom: Plantae
- Clade: Tracheophytes
- Clade: Angiosperms
- Clade: Eudicots
- Clade: Asterids
- Order: Gentianales
- Family: Apocynaceae
- Subfamily: Rauvolfioideae
- Tribe: Plumerieae
- Subtribe: Thevetiinae
- Genus: Skytanthus; Meyen

Synonyms
- Habsburgia Mart., not validly published; Neriandra A.DC.; Scytalanthus Schauer; Skytalanthus Endl.

= Skytanthus =

Genus of plants

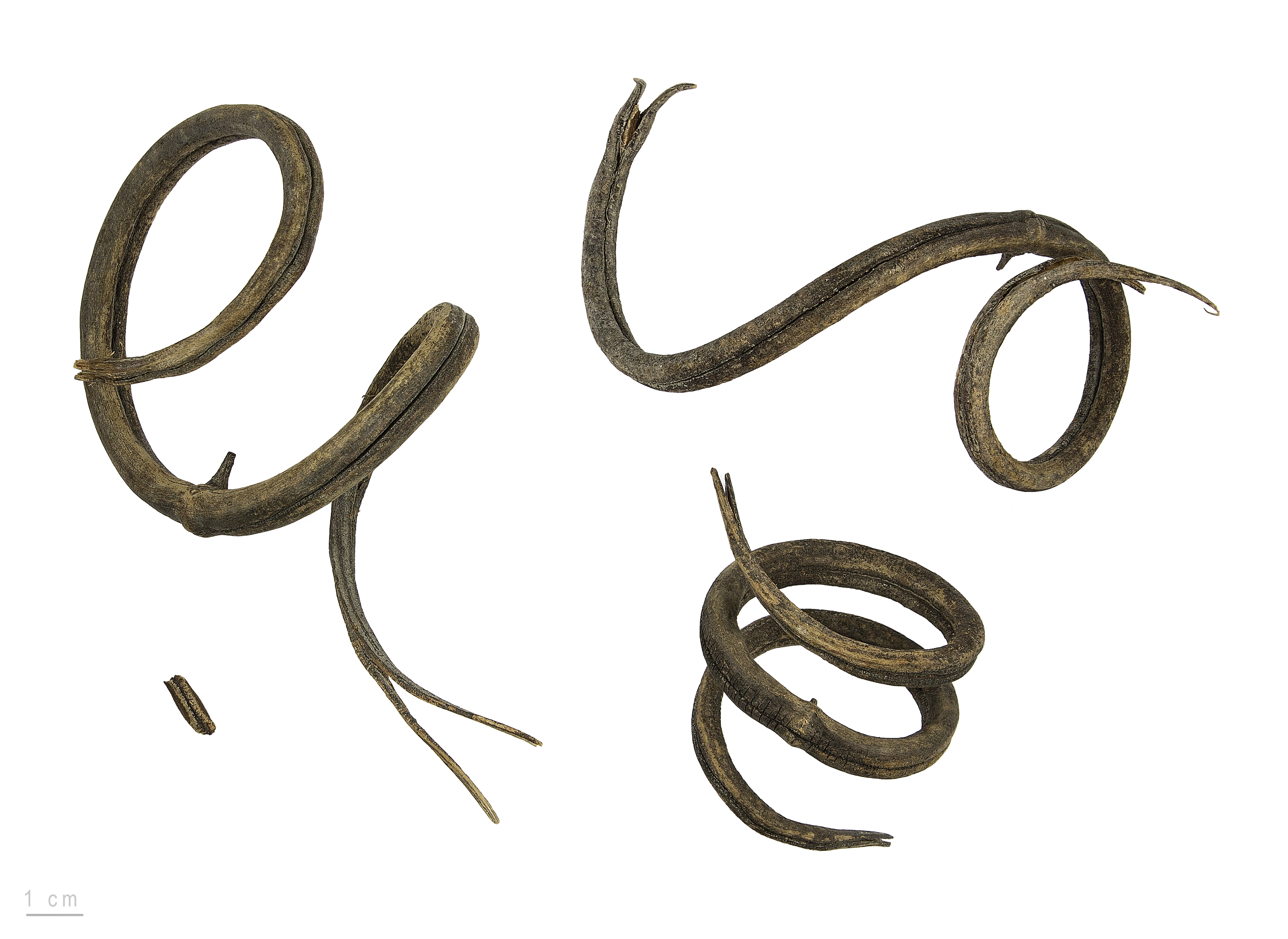
Skytanthus acutus - MHNT

Skytanthus is a genus of flowering plants in the family Apocynaceae, first described in 1834. It is native to Brazil and Chile in South America.

Species

- Skytanthus acutus Meyen - from Antofagasta to Coquimbo in N + C Chile
- Skytanthus hancorniifolius (A.DC.) Miers - E Brazil
- Skytanthus martianus (Müll.Arg.) Miers - Bahia + Minas Gerais in Brazil

Formerly placed in this genus

- Skytanthus havanensis (Müll.Arg.) Miers = Cameraria latifolia L.
