= Crioceras dipladeniiflorus =

Scientific classification
- Kingdom: Plantae
- Clade: Tracheophytes
- Clade: Angiosperms
- Clade: Eudicots
- Clade: Asterids
- Order: Gentianales
- Family: Apocynaceae
- Subfamily: Rauvolfioideae
- Tribe: Tabernaemontaneae
- Subtribe: Tabernaemontaninae
- Genus: Crioceras; Pierre (1897)
- Species: C. dipladeniiflorus

Binomial name
- Crioceras dipladeniiflorus (Stapf) K.Schum. (1900)

Synonyms
- Tabernaemontana dipladeniiflora Stapf (1894); Crioceras longiflorus Pierre (1897)

Species of plant

Crioceras is a plant genus in the family Apocynaceae first described as a species in 1897. It contains only one known species, Crioceras dipladeniiflorus, native to tropical central Africa (Gabon, Republic of Congo, and the Angolan province of Cabinda).

The type species is Crioceras longiflorus (syn of C. dipladeniiflorus) described by Jean Baptiste Louis Pierre.

An alkaloid present in Crioceras longiflorus is called 12-Methoxyvoaphylline.
