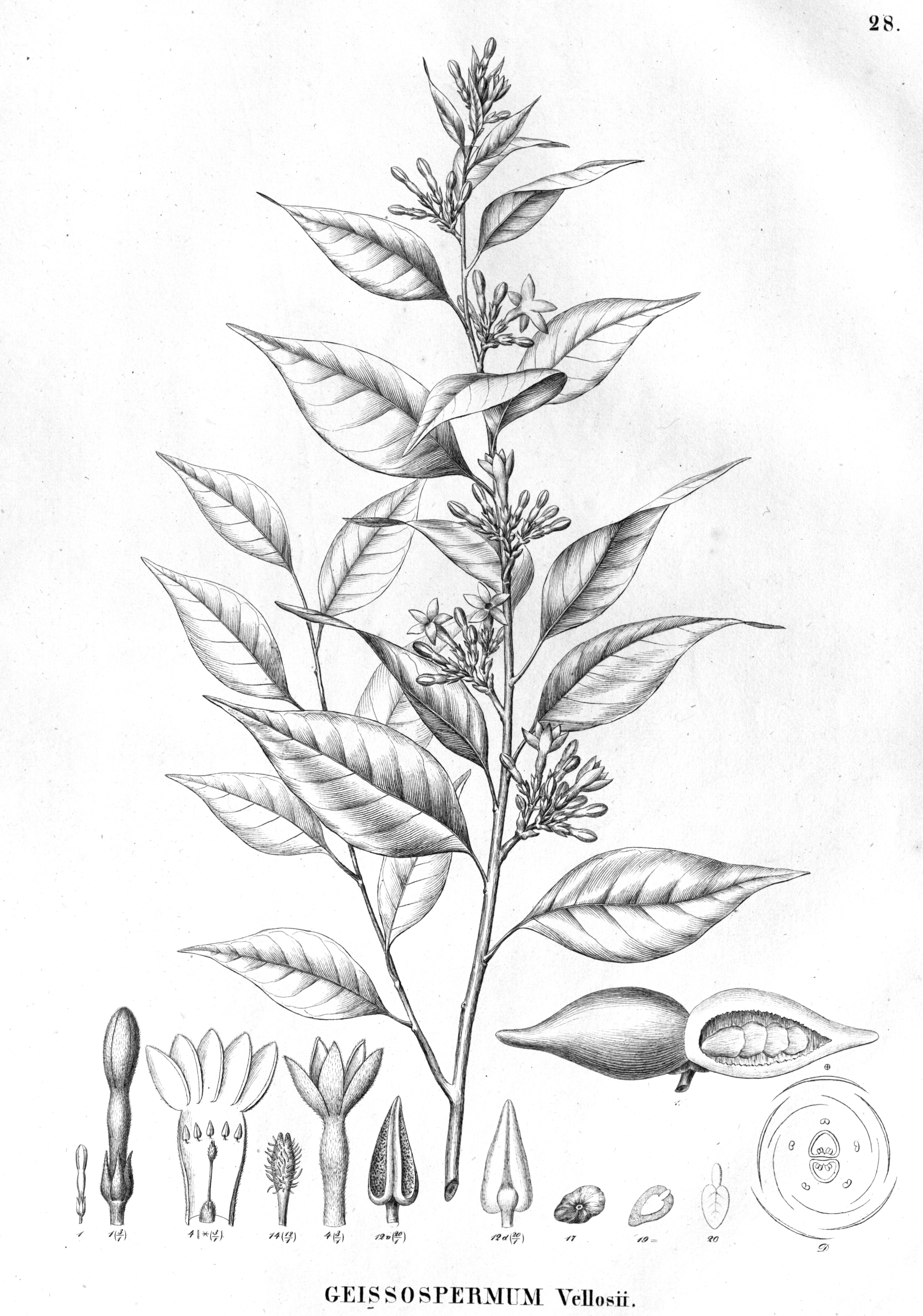
- Geissospermum laeve

Scientific classification
- Kingdom: Plantae
- Clade: Tracheophytes
- Clade: Angiosperms
- Clade: Eudicots
- Clade: Asterids
- Order: Gentianales
- Family: Apocynaceae
- Subfamily: Rauvolfioideae
- Tribe: Aspidospermateae
- Genus: Geissospermum; Allemão

Synonyms
- Wheelera Schreb.

= Geissospermum =

Genus of flowering plants

Geissospermum is a genus of flowering plants in the family Apocynaceae, first described as a genus in 1846. It is native to South America.

Species

- Geissospermum argenteum Woodson - Venezuela, the Guianas
- Geissospermum fuscum Markgr - S Venezuela, NW Brazil
- Geissospermum laeve (Vell.) Miers - N + E Brazil, the Guianas
- Geissospermum reticulatum A.H.Gentry - S Venezuela, Peru, N Bolivia
- Geissospermum sericeum Miers - Guyana, Suriname, French Guiana
- Geissospermum urceolatum A.H.Gentry - NW Brazil
