= Spongiosperma macrophyllum =

Scientific classification
- Kingdom: Plantae
- Clade: Tracheophytes
- Clade: Angiosperms
- Clade: Eudicots
- Clade: Asterids
- Order: Gentianales
- Family: Apocynaceae
- Genus: Spongiosperma
- Species: S. macrophyllum

Binomial name
- Spongiosperma macrophyllum (Müll.Arg.) Zarucchi

Synonyms
- Ambelania macrophylla Müll.Arg.; Molongum macrophyllum (Müll.Arg.) Pichon; Rhigospira venulosa Miers; Ambelania lopezii Woodson

Species of plant

Spongiosperma macrophyllum is a species of plant in the family Apocynaceae first described in 1860. It is native to the Amazon Basin of South America, nations of Venezuela, Colombia, and Brazil .
