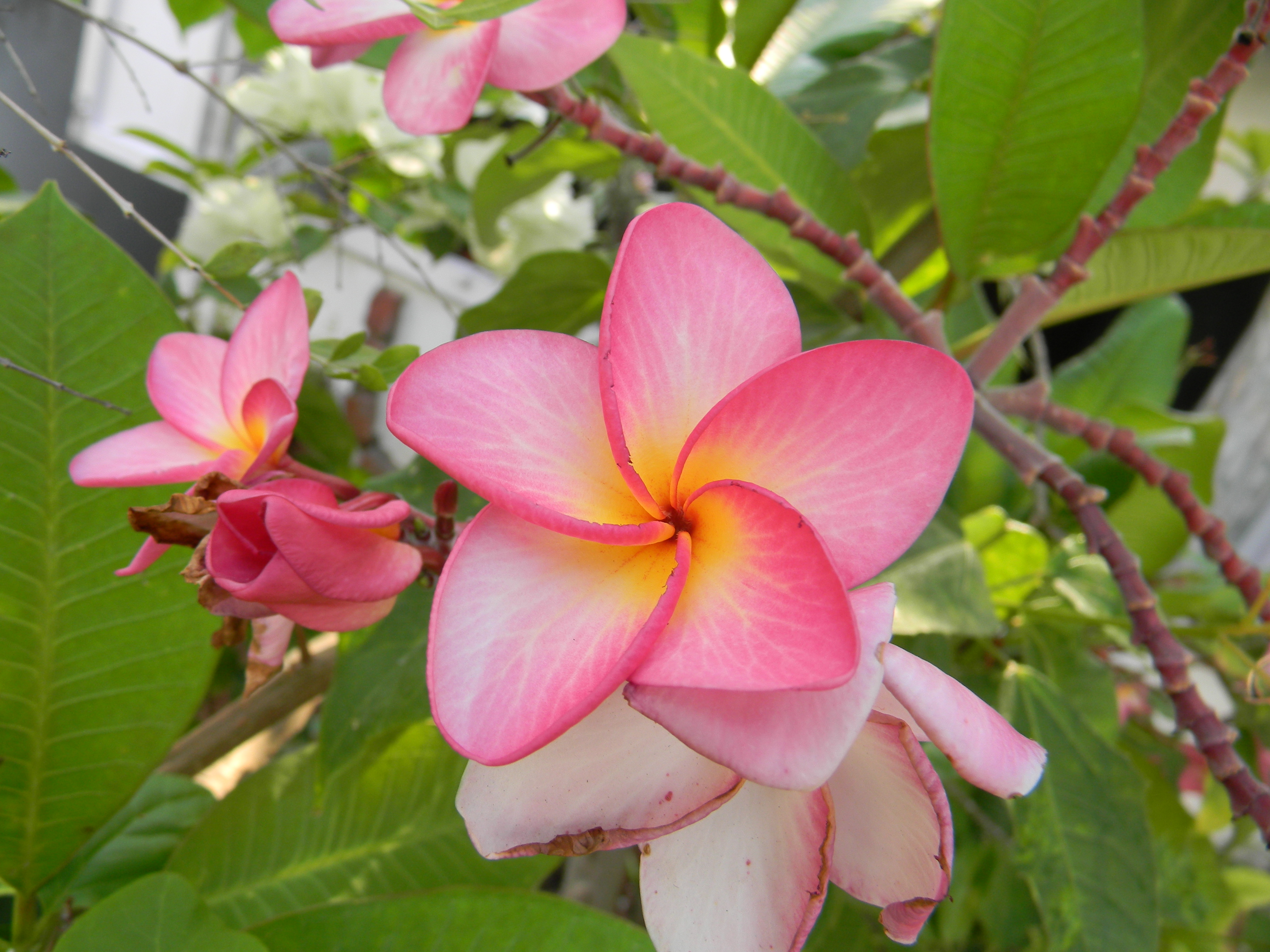
- Plumeria rubra

Scientific classification
- Kingdom: Plantae
- Clade: Tracheophytes
- Clade: Angiosperms
- Clade: Eudicots
- Clade: Asterids
- Order: Gentianales
- Family: Apocynaceae
- Subtribe: Plumeriinae
- Genus: Plumeria; Tourn. ex L.

Type species
- Plumeria rubra L.

Species
- See text

Synonyms
- Plumieria Scop. orth. var.

= Plumeria =

Genus of flowering plants endemic to the Americas

Plumeria (/pluːˈmɛriə/), commonly known as frangipani, is a genus of flowering plants in the family Apocynaceae. Most species are deciduous shrubs or small trees. They are native to the Neotropical realm in Mexico, Central America, the Caribbean, and northwestern South America, but are often grown as ornamental plants in tropical regions, including Florida, Hawaii, South America south to northern Argentina, southern China, northern India, Nepal, Bangladesh, Senegal, and in parts of the Arabian Peninsula with irrigation.

== Description ==
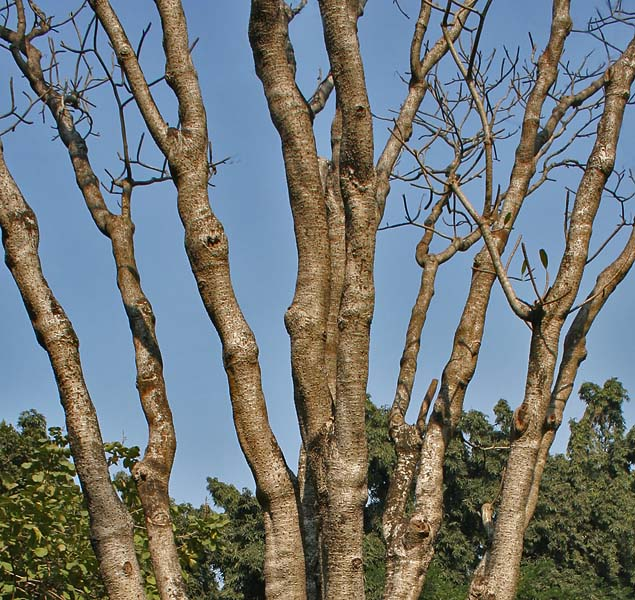
Frangipani trunk in Kolkata, West Bengal, India

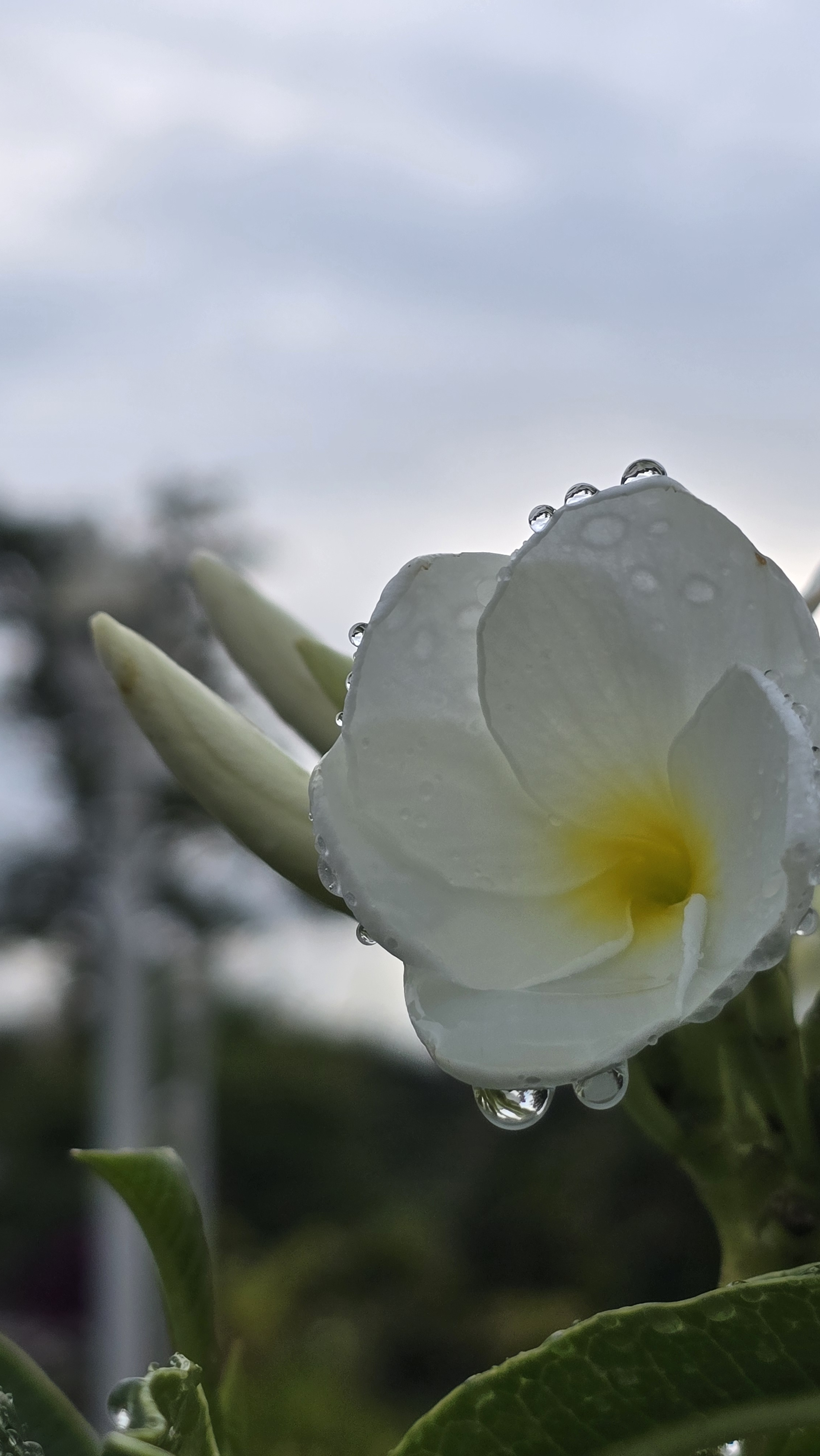
White plumeria flower in Coorg, Chikmagalur

Plumeria branches are succulent. The trunk and branches of Plumeria species have a milky latex sap that, like many other Apocynaceae, contains poisonous compounds that irritate the eyes and skin.

=== Leaves ===
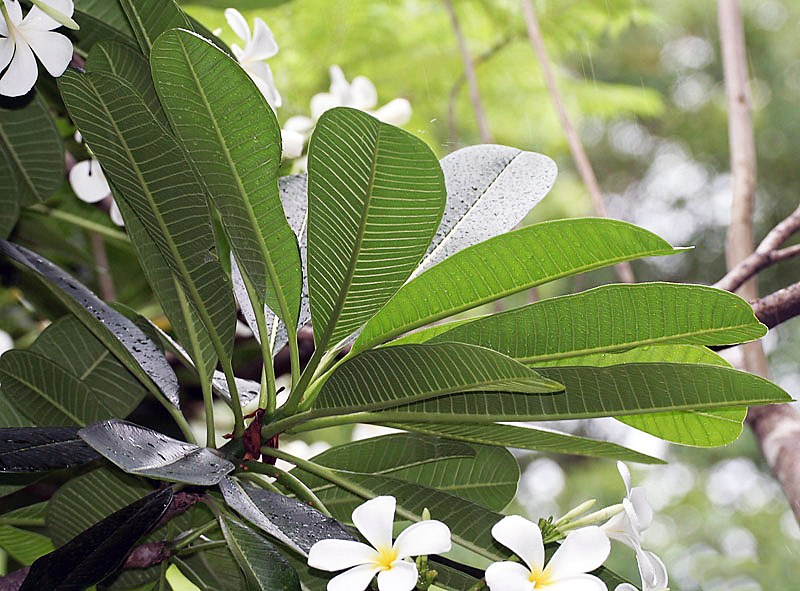
Leaves

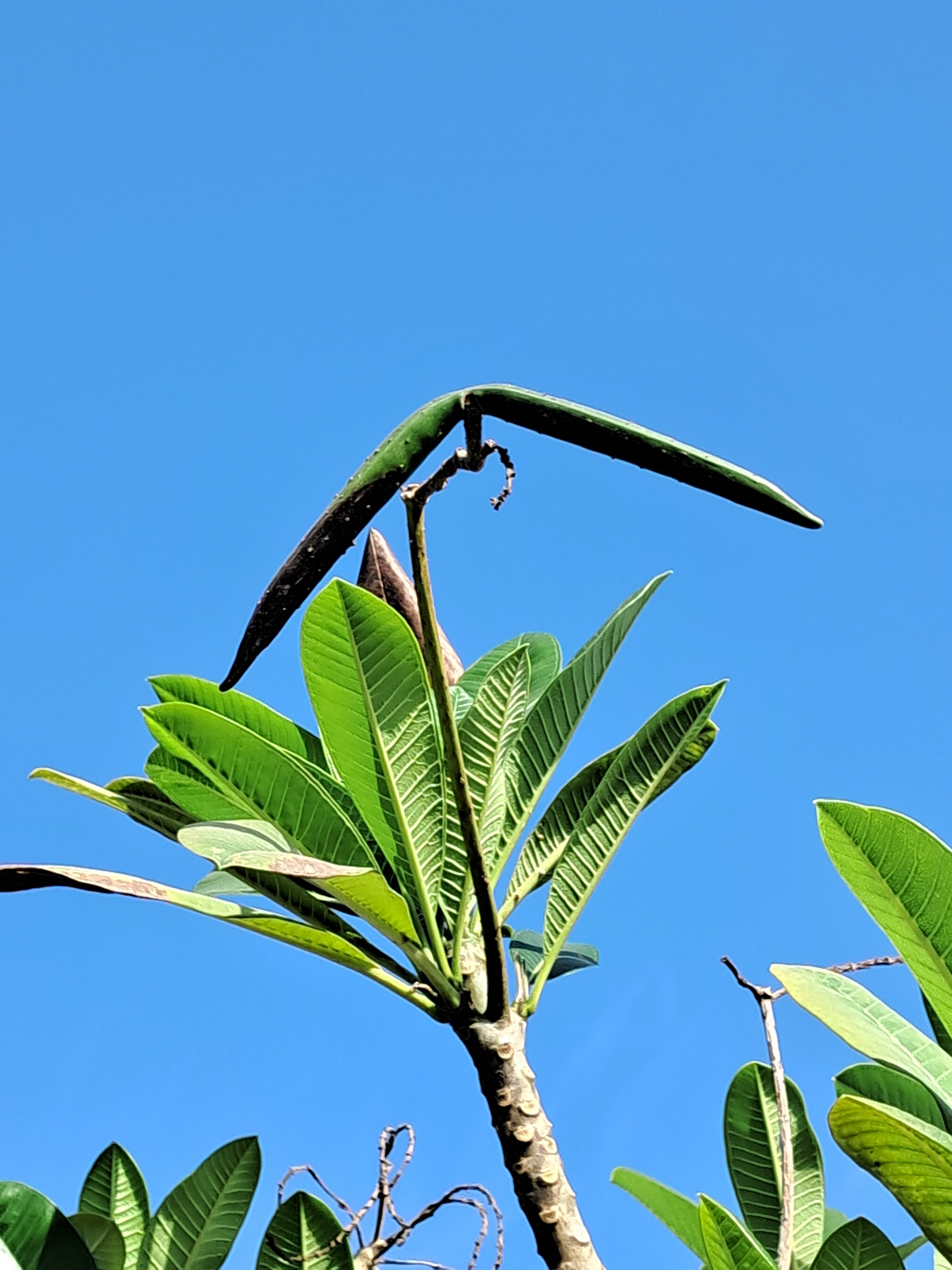
Fruit

Plumeria species are small trees or low shrubs. The leaves grow at tips of their branches. Various species and cultivar have various leaf shape and arrangements. The leaves of P. alba are narrow and corrugated, whereas leaves of P. pudica have an elongated shape and glossy, dark-green colour. P. pudica is one of the everblooming types with nondeciduous, evergreen leaves. Another, semi-deciduous species that retains leaves and flowers in winter is P. obtusa; sometimes known as "Singapore plumeria".

=== Flowers ===
Time-lapse of a flower opening

Plumeria trees flower from early summer to fall. Their blossoms grow in clusters on ends of the stems, they are made of tubular corolla with a length of 2–4 inches (5.1–10.2 cm) that split sharply into five rounded and waxy petals that overlap each other. These flowers come in many colours including pink, red, white and yellow, orange, or pastel. They have separate anthers.

The flowers are highly fragrant, especially at night. Their scent is perceived to have floral elements of jasmine, citrus, gardenia, fruity aromatic notes of coconut, peach, vanilla, as well as lactonic, woody accords. However, they yield no nectar. Their scent tricks sphinx moths into pollinating them by transferring pollen from flower to flower in their fruitless search for nectar.

Its fruit separates into two follicles with winged seeds.

== Taxonomy ==
The name Plumeria was first used by Joseph Pitton de Tournefort in 1700, but was not formally published until 1753 by Carl Linnaeus. Linnaeus affirmed the name in his seminal work Species Plantarum, and added the three species that were known at the time, P. rubra, P. alba and P. obtusa.

Within the family Apocynaceae, Plumeria is placed in the subfamily Rauvolfioideae, tribe Plumerieae and subtribe Plumeriinae. The subtribe also includes the genera Himatanthus and Mortoniella. The type species P. rubra was designated in 1925 by Nathaniel Lord Britton and Percy Wilson

=== Etymology ===
The naming of this genus is attributed to French botanist Joseph Pitton de Tournefort who, in 1700, created the name in honour of Charles Plumier. Plumier was also a French botanist, who had explored the tropical Americas as Louis XIV's royal botanist, and described a large number of species.

=== Common names ===
The plants of this species are commonly known as frangipani in English, although the generic name Plumeria is often used as a vernacular name. Other names exist across southeast Asia in the various cultures, including kemboja, bunga kubur, chempaka, pagoda tree and camboja.

A fictitious account of the origin of the name 'frangipani' was published in 1867. The English perfumer Septimus Piesse claimed in his book that the name is taken from that of a crewman with Columbus by the name of Mercutio Frangipani. Piesse further claimed that Frangipani was able to detect a fragrance as the ship approached Antigua, and upon landing found it to be coming from the flowers of P. alba, which was in bloom at the time. This story and the Frangipani character were concocted by Piesse and some associates to drive up commercial interest in his products.

== Species ==
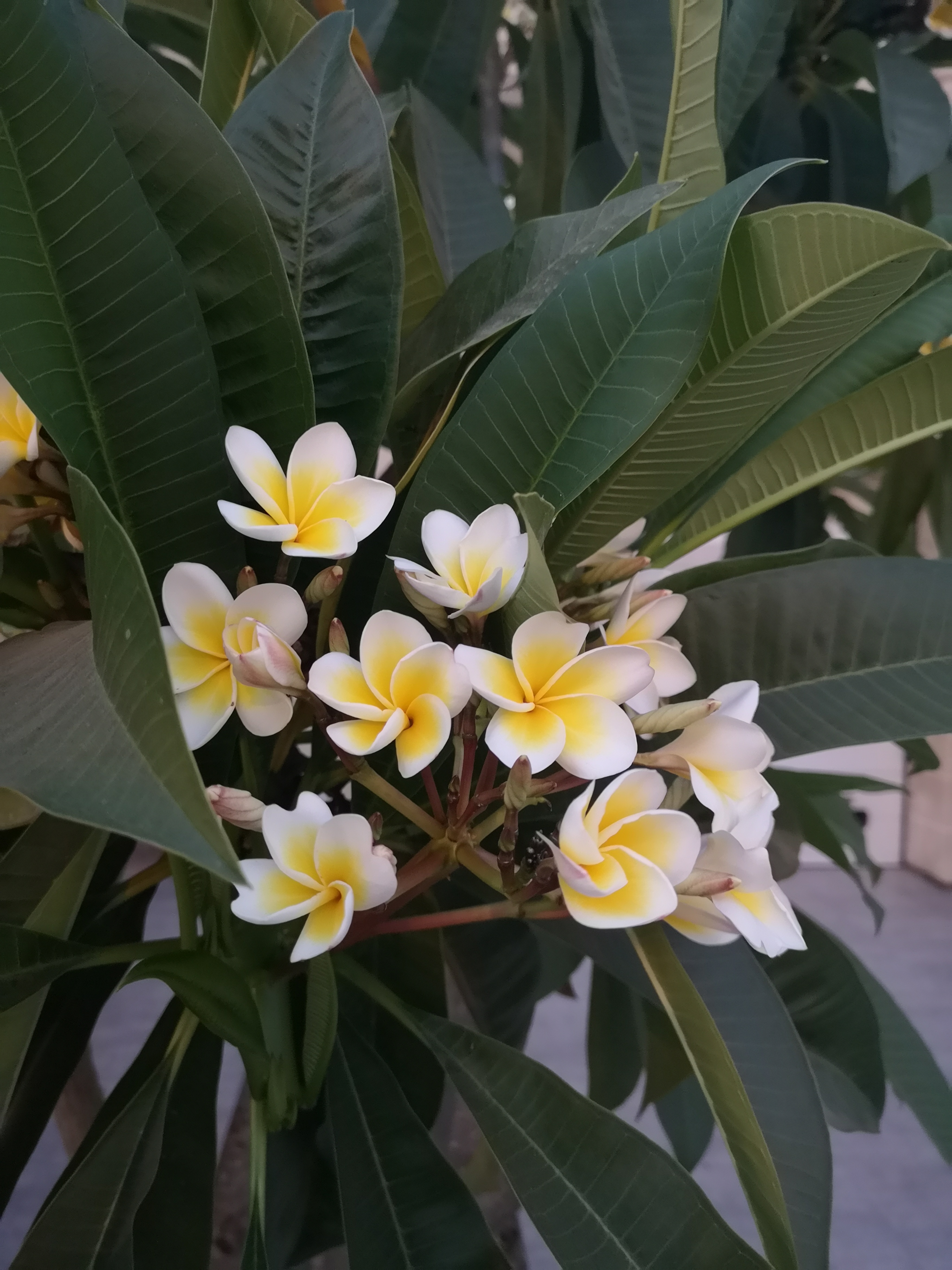
A frangipani tree in bloom in Bugibba, Malta

The genus Plumeria includes 18 accepted species and one natural hybrid, with over 100 additional names regarded as synonyms. As of March 2026, Plants of the World Online accepted the following species:

- Plumeria alba L. - Puerto Rico, Lesser Antilles
- Plumeria clusioides Griseb. - Cuba
- Plumeria cubensis Urb. - Cuba
- Plumeria ekmanii Urb. - Cuba
- Plumeria emarginata Griseb. - Cuba
- Plumeria filifolia Griseb. - Cuba
- Plumeria inodora Jacq. - Guyana, Colombia, Venezuela (incl. Venezuelan islands in the Caribbean)
- Plumeria krugii Urb. - Puerto Rico
- Plumeria lanata Britton - Cuba
- Plumeria magna Zanoni & M.M.Mejía - Hispaniola (Dominican Republic)
- Plumeria montana Britton & P.Wilson - Cuba
- Plumeria obtusa L. - West Indies (including Greater Antilles and Bahamas), southern Mexico, Belize, Guatemala; naturalised in China, Florida, and the United Arab Emirates
- Plumeria pudica Jacq. - Panama, Colombia, Venezuela (incl. Venezuelan islands in Caribbean)
- Plumeria rubra L. - Mexico, Central America, Colombia, Venezuela; naturalised in China, the Himalayas, West Indies, elsewhere in South America, and numerous oceanic islands
- Plumeria × stenopetala Urb. - Hispaniola (Dominican Republic and Haiti)
- Plumeria subsessilis A.DC. - Hispaniola
- Plumeria trinitensis Britton - Cuba
- Plumeria tuberculata G.Lodd. - Hispaniola, possibly Cuba, Bahamas, Jamaica
- Plumeria venosa Britton - Cuba

Formerly included in genus

- Plumeria ambigua Müll.Arg. = Himatanthus bracteatus (A.DC.) Woodson
- Plumeria angustiflora Spruce ex Müll.Arg. = Himatanthus attenuatus (Benth.) Woodson
- Plumeria articulata Vahl = Himatanthus articulatus (Vahl) Woodson
- Plumeria attenuata Benth = Himatanthus attenuatus (Benth.) Woodson
- Plumeria bracteata A.DC. = Himatanthus bracteatus (A.DC.) Woodson
- Plumeria drastica Mart. = Himatanthus drasticus (Mart.) Plumel
- Plumeria fallax Müll.Arg. = Himatanthus drasticus (Mart.) Plumel
- Plumeria floribunda var floribunda = Himatanthus articulatus (Vahl) Woodson
- Plumeria floribunda var. acutifolia Müll.Arg. = Himatanthus bracteatus (A.DC.) Woodson
- Plumeria floribunda var. calycina Müll.Arg. = Himatanthus bracteatus (A.DC.) Woodson
- Plumeria floribunda var. crassipes Müll.Arg. = Himatanthus bracteatus (A.DC.) Woodson
- Plumeria hilariana Müll.Arg. = Himatanthus obovatus (Müll.Arg.) Woodson
- Plumeria lancifolia Müll.Arg. = Himatanthus bracteatus (A.DC.) Woodson
- Plumeria latifolia Pilg. = Himatanthus obovatus (Müll.Arg.) Woodson
- Plumeria martii Müll.Arg. = Himatanthus bracteatus (A.DC.) Woodson
- Plumeria microcalyx Standl. = Himatanthus articulatus (Vahl) Woodson
- Plumeria mulongo Benth. = Himatanthus attenuatus (Benth.) Woodson
- Plumeria obovata Müll.Arg. = Himatanthus obovatus (Müll.Arg.) Woodson
- Plumeria oligoneura Malme = Himatanthus obovatus (Müll.Arg.) Woodson
- Plumeria phagedaenica Benth. ex Müll.Arg. 1860 not Mart. 1831 = Himatanthus drasticus (Mart.) Plumel
- Plumeria phagedaenica Mart. 1831 not Benth. ex Müll.Arg. 1860= Himatanthus phagedaenicus (Mart.) Woodson
- Plumeria puberula Müll.Arg. = Himatanthus obovatus (Müll.Arg.) Woodson
- Plumeria retusa Lam. = Tabernaemontana retusa (Lam.) Pichon
- Plumeria revoluta Huber = Himatanthus stenophyllus Plumel
- Plumeria speciosa Müll.Arg. = Himatanthus bracteatus (A.DC.) Woodson
- Plumeria sucuuba Spruce ex Müll.Arg. = Himatanthus articulatus (Vahl) Woodson
- Plumeria tarapotensis K.Schum. ex Markgr. = Himatanthus tarapotensis (K.Schum. ex Markgr.) Plumel
- Plumeria velutina Müll.Arg. = Himatanthus obovatus (Müll.Arg.) Woodson
- Plumeria warmingii Müll.Arg. = Himatanthus obovatus (Müll.Arg.) Woodson

== Propagation ==
Plumeria can be propagated by seed or vegetatively propagated by cutting stem tips in spring, allowing them to dry at their bases, then planting in well-drained soil. These are particularly susceptible to rot in moist soil. Applying rooting hormone to the clean fresh-cut end will enable callusing.

Plumeria cuttings can also be propagated by grafting to an already rooted system. The Plumeria Society of America lists 368 registered cultivars of Plumeria as of 2009.

== In culture ==
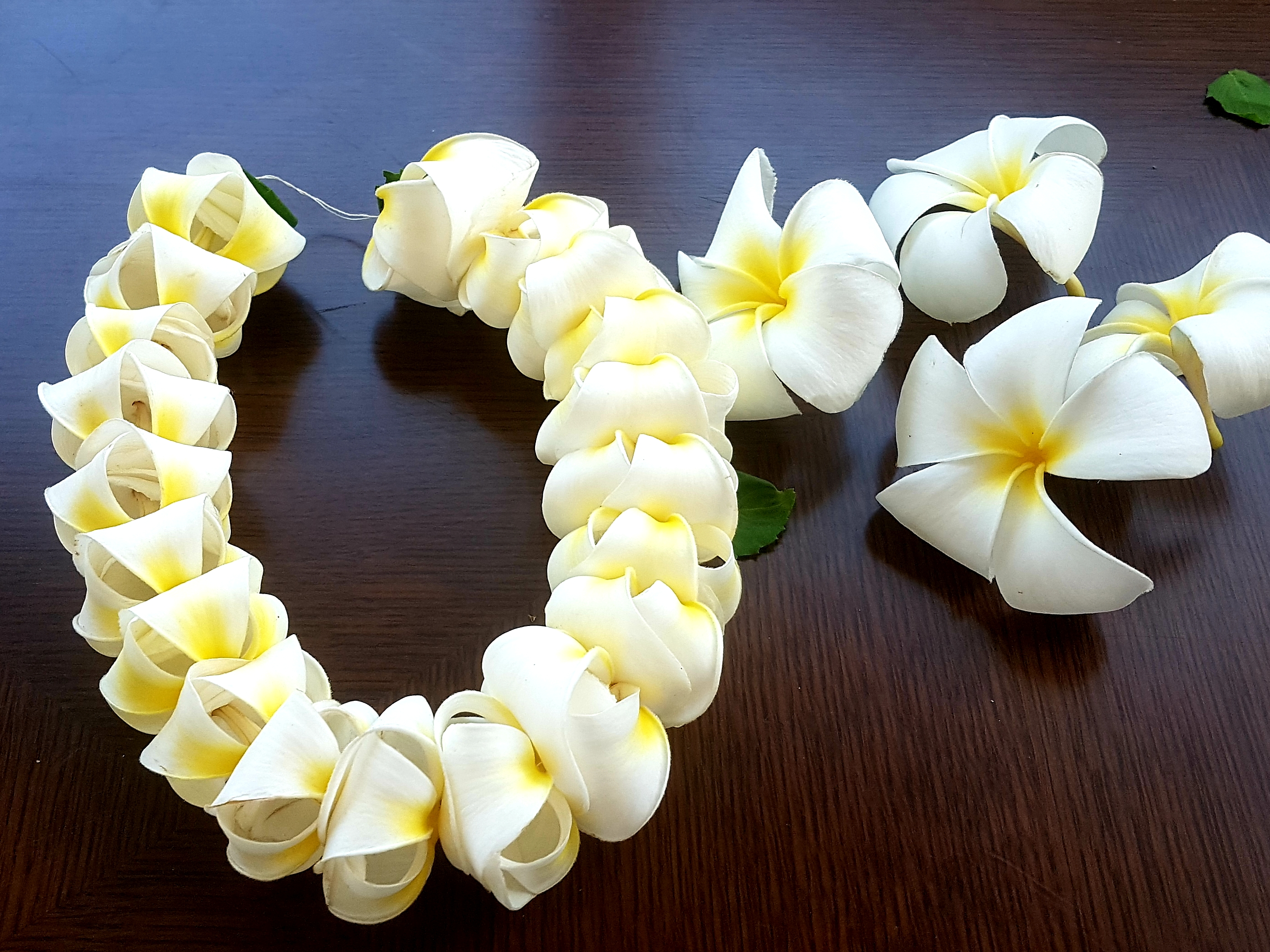
Plumeria is commonly used to make leis in Hawaii.

In Mesoamerica, plumerias have carried complex symbolic significance for over two millennia, with striking examples from the Maya and Aztec periods into the present. Among the Maya, plumerias have been associated with deities representing life and fertility, and the flowers also became strongly connected with female sexuality. Nahuatl-speaking people during the height of the Aztec Empire used plumerias to signify elite status, and planted plumerias in the gardens of nobles.

Plumeria rubra is the national flower of Nicaragua.

Plumerias were introduced into the Philippines in the 1560s by the Spanish, and from there they were taken into Indonesia and Malaysia. In these areas, plumerias are often associated with ghosts and death, and are planted around cemeteries in the belief that the fragrant flowers ward off evil spirits by masking the smell of decay. Yangsze Choo in her novel The Night Tiger for example described it as is "the graveyard flower of the Malays". Plumerias often are planted on burial grounds in all three nations. They are also common ornamental plants in houses, parks, parking lots, and other open-air establishments in the Philippines. Balinese Hindus use the flowers in their temple offerings. The plumeria's fragrance is also associated with the Kuntilanak, an evil vampiric spirit of a dead mother in Malaysian-Indonesian folklores. In the culture of the Philippines, this vampiric ghost is called an Aswang.

In several Pacific islands, where plumerias were introduced in the late 19th century, such as Tahiti, Fiji, Samoa, Hawaii, New Zealand, Tonga, and the Cook Islands, Plumeria species are used for making leis. In Hawaii, the flower is called melia. In modern Polynesian culture, the flower can be worn by women to indicate their relationship status—over the right ear if seeking a relationship, and over the left if taken.

Plumeria rubra is the national flower of Laos, where it is known under the local name dok champa. It is also used as the logo of Lao Airlines, the national airline of Laos.

In eastern India and Bangladesh, plumeria is traditionally considered as a variety of the champak flower, the golok chapa, meaning the champaka that resides in the heavenly home of Sri Krishna, a Hindu god at the highest realm of heaven. In Sri Lanka it is known as "Araliya" or "Temple Flower". The flower, considered sacred, is also known by the names gulancha and kath golap.

In Bengali culture, most white flowers, and in particular, plumeria (Bengali, chômpa or chãpa), are associated with funerals and death.

Indian incenses scented with Plumeria rubra have "champa" in their names. For example, nag champa is an incense containing a fragrance combining plumeria and sandalwood. While plumeria is an ingredient in Indian champa incense, the extent of its use varies between family recipes. Most champa incenses also incorporate other tree resins, such as Halmaddi (Ailanthus triphysa) and benzoin resin, as well as other floral ingredients, including champaca (Magnolia champaca), geranium (Pelargonium graveolens), and vanilla (Vanilla planifolia) to produce a more intense, plumeria-like aroma.

In the Western Ghats of Karnataka, the bride and groom exchange garlands of cream-coloured plumeria during weddings. Red-coloured flowers are not used in weddings in this region. Plumeria plants are found in most of the temples in these regions.

In Eastern Africa, frangipani are sometimes referred to in Swahili love poems.

Some species of plumeria have been studied for their potential medicinal value.

=== Therapeutic and Medicinal Value ===
In Ayurvedic medicine, it is used to reduce fever, inflammation of the joints, and to relieve colic. It is also used for skin and wound care, and as an antioxidant. Furthermore, extracts from the flowers and latex have been used to treat pathogens, fungi, and bacteria. It is valued for periodontal purposes, and can be used to treat herpies, scabies, ulcers, and other skin ailments. Furthermore, traditional medicine has valued its role in diabetes treatment, as a purgative, diuretic, and even as a means of birth control. Even its poisonous sap is used for therapeutic purposes, for stomach pains, bloating, and as a laxative.

=== Commercial Value ===
In Vietnam, the Frangipani Club was started. Members of the club were sent to Thailand to learn about frangipani cultivation. Via cutting and grafting, flowers now grow in the country in a profusion of colours, and a variety of types, enabling farmers in the outskirts of Ho Chi Minh City to not only escape penury but to earn a handsome living, and even garner significant wealth. The plant is used nationally for landscaping in pagodas and temples, village entrances and urban environments. The demand is especially high during holidays and at expositions.

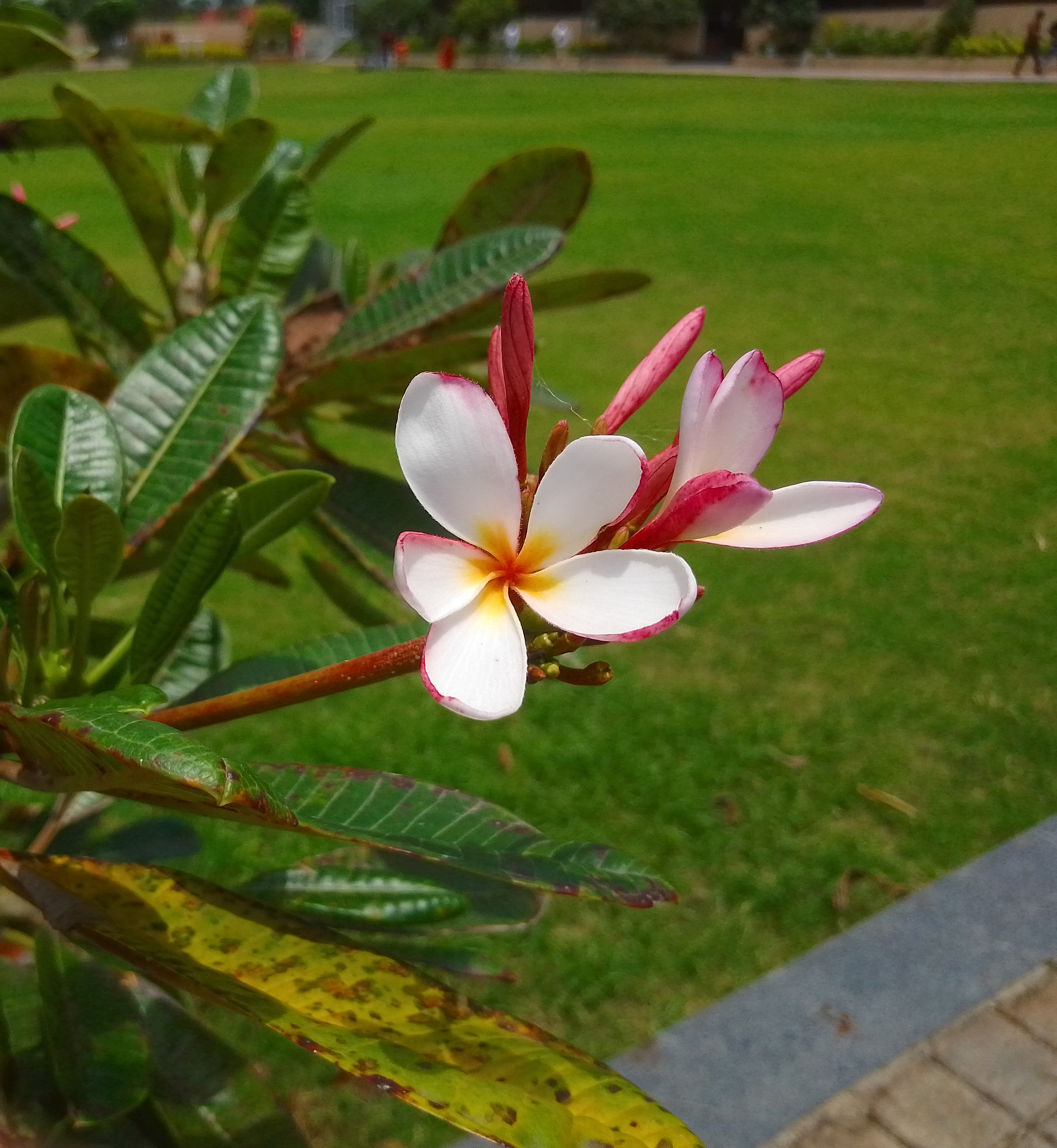
Red plumeria found in Nashik, India

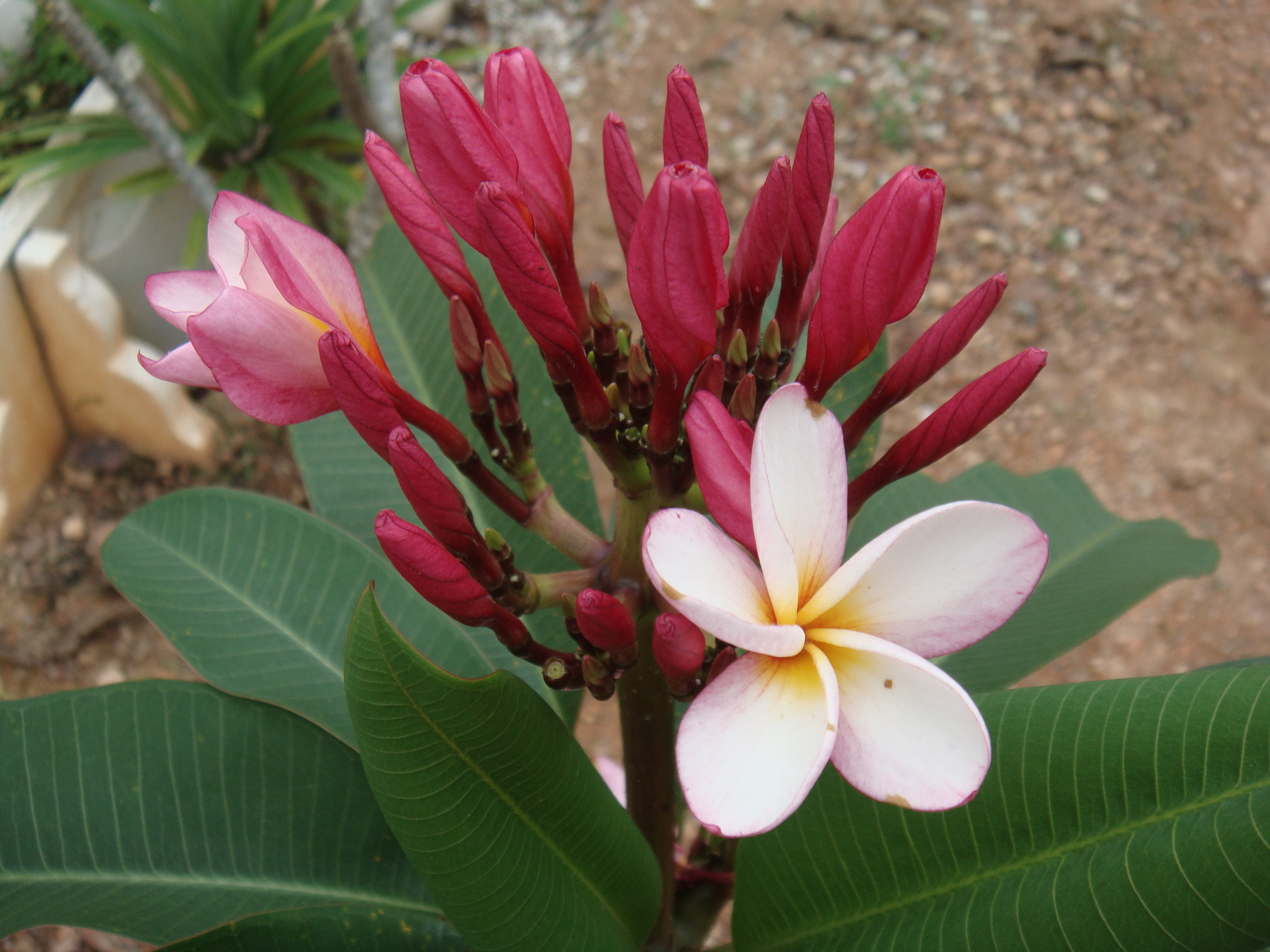
Red frangipani found in Malaysia

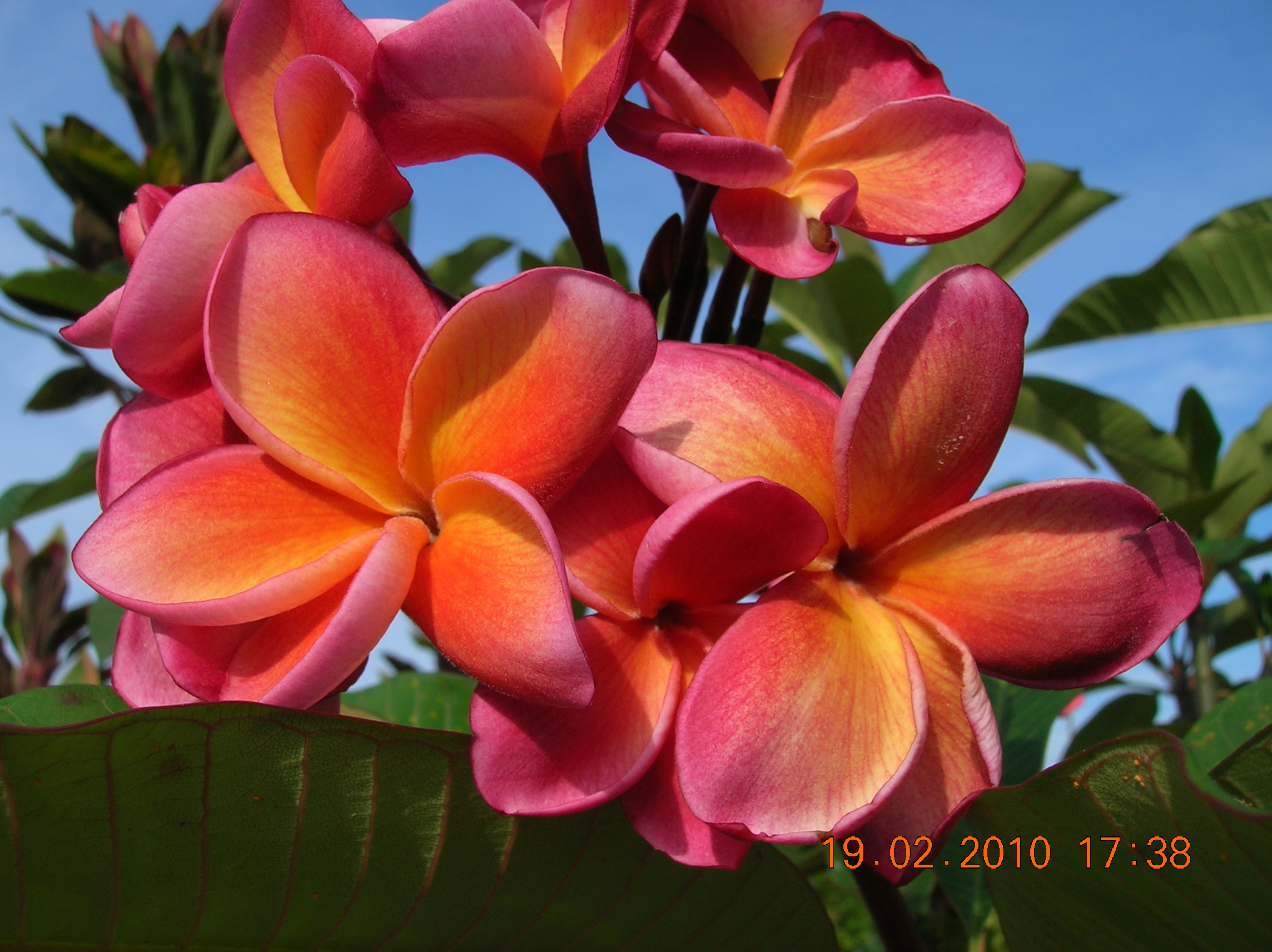
Red frangipani found in Malaysia

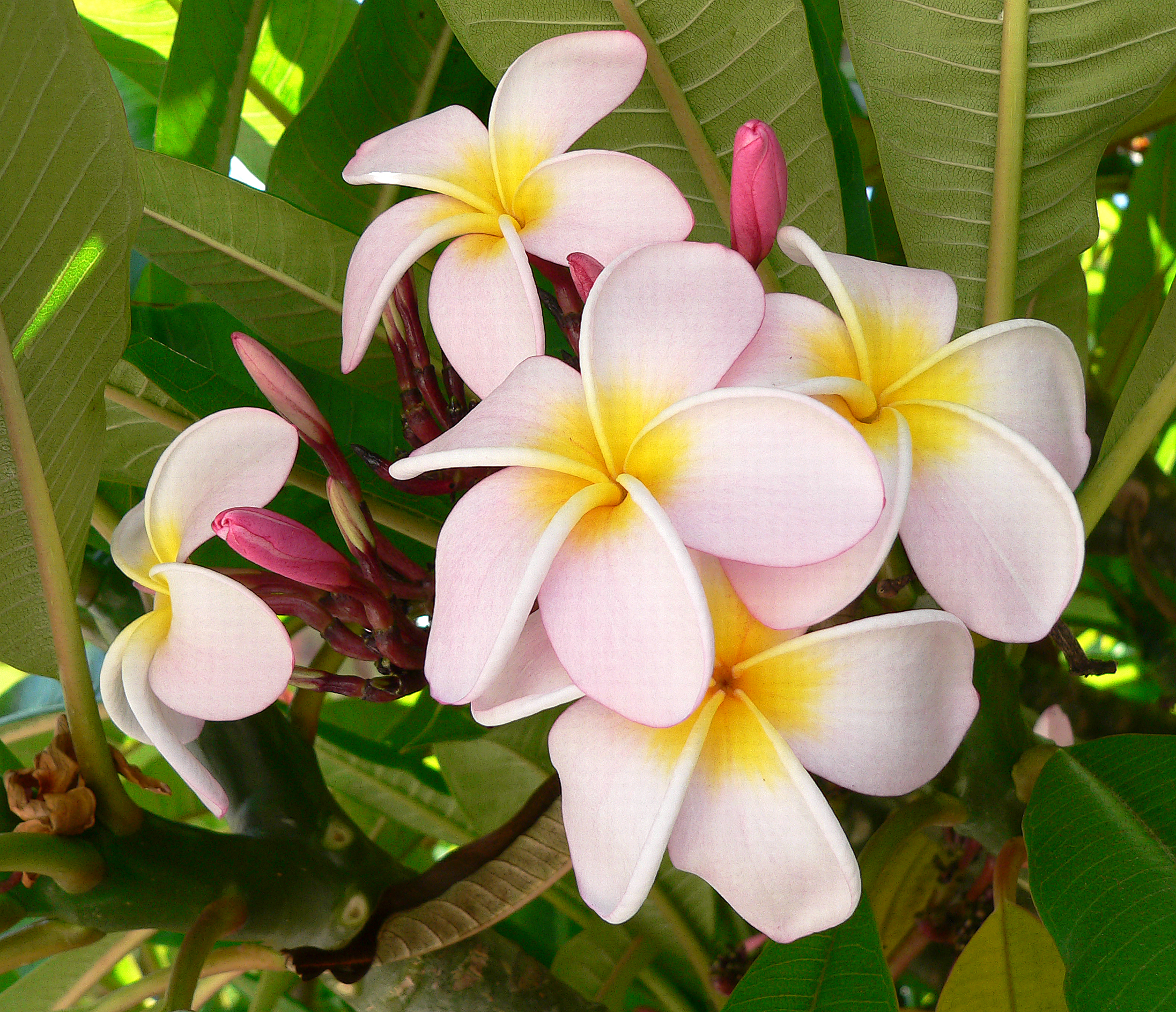
Plumeria in the Jardin des Plantes de Lille, Lille, France

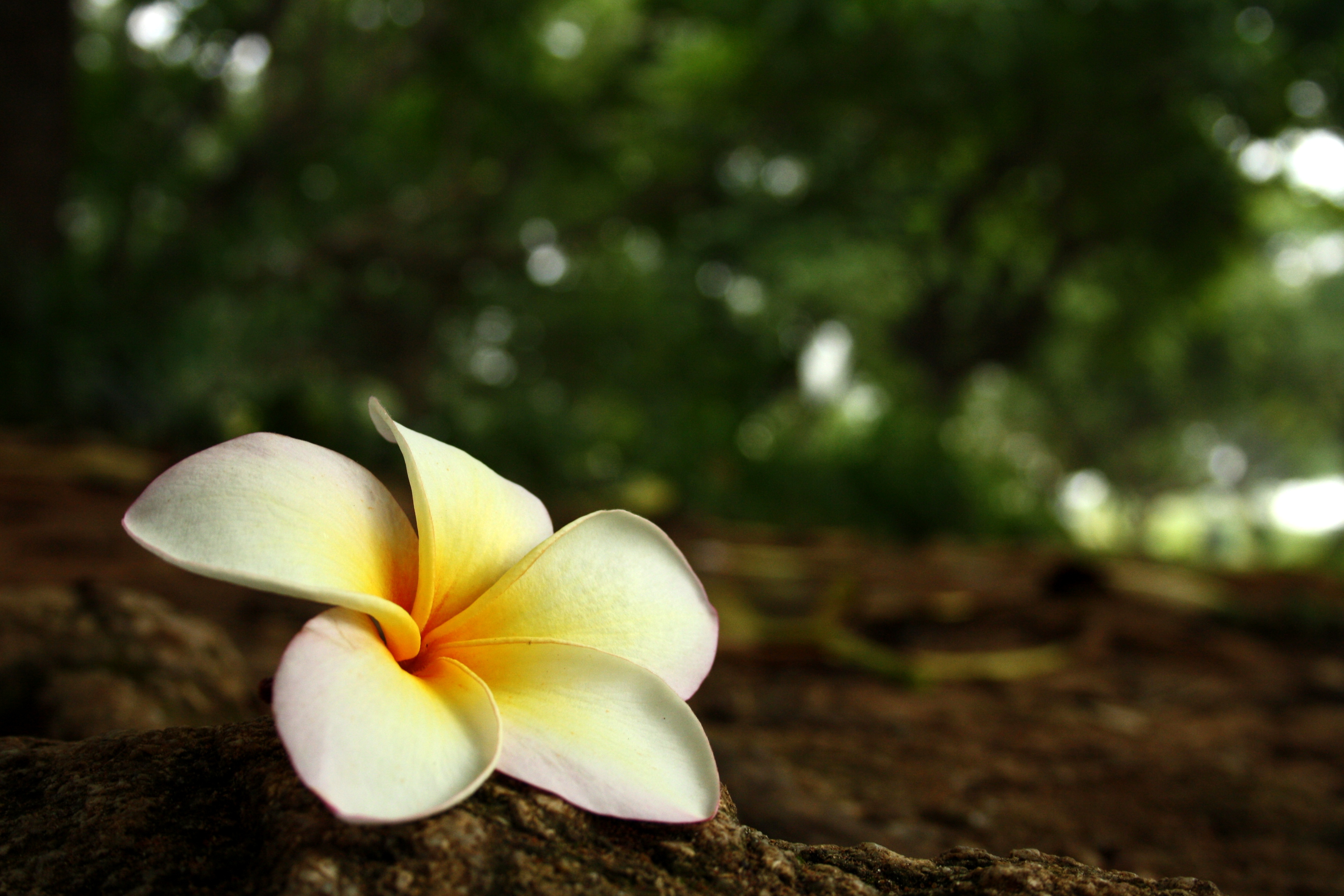
Plumeria found in Bangalore, India

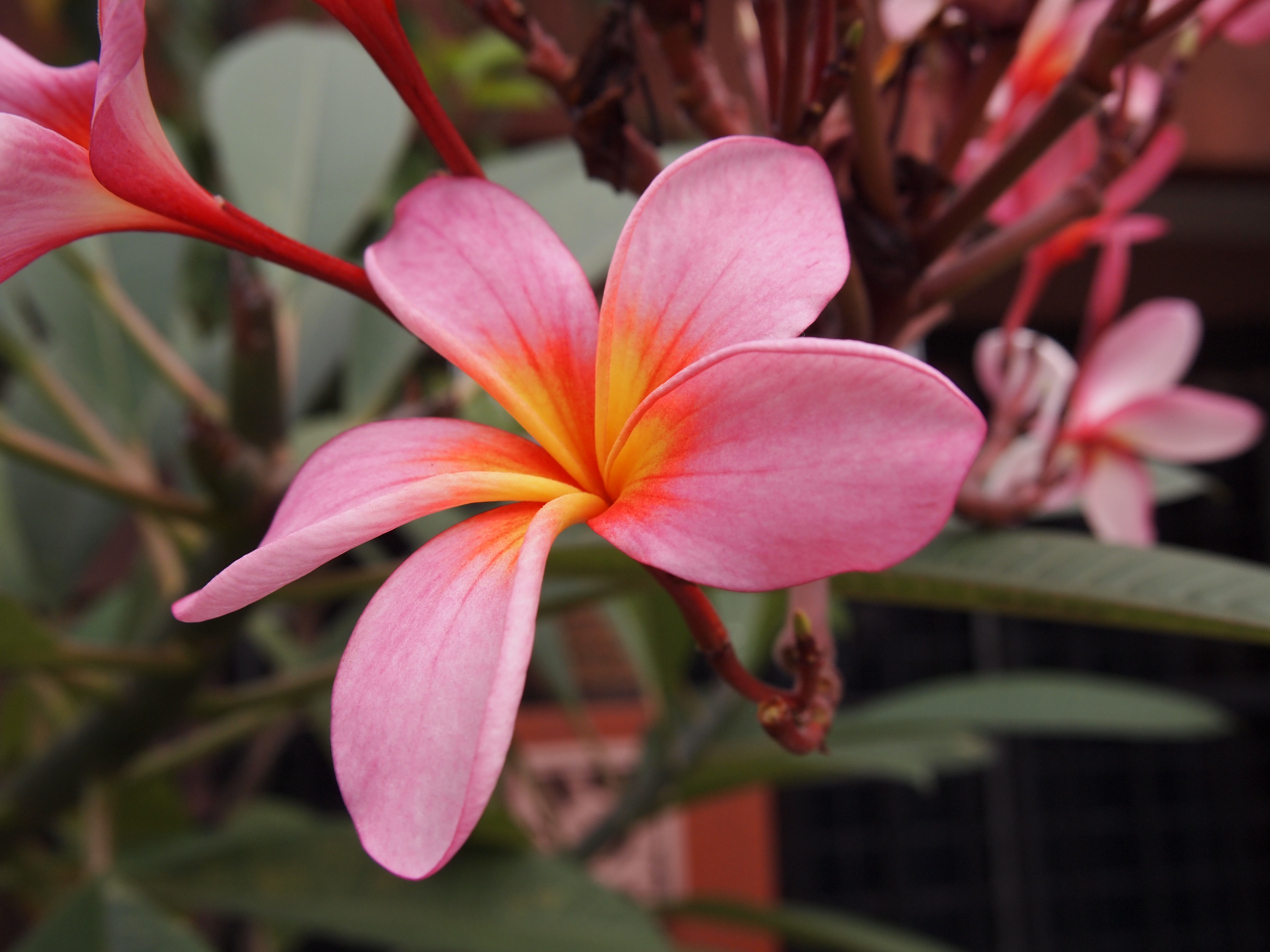
Pink frangipani

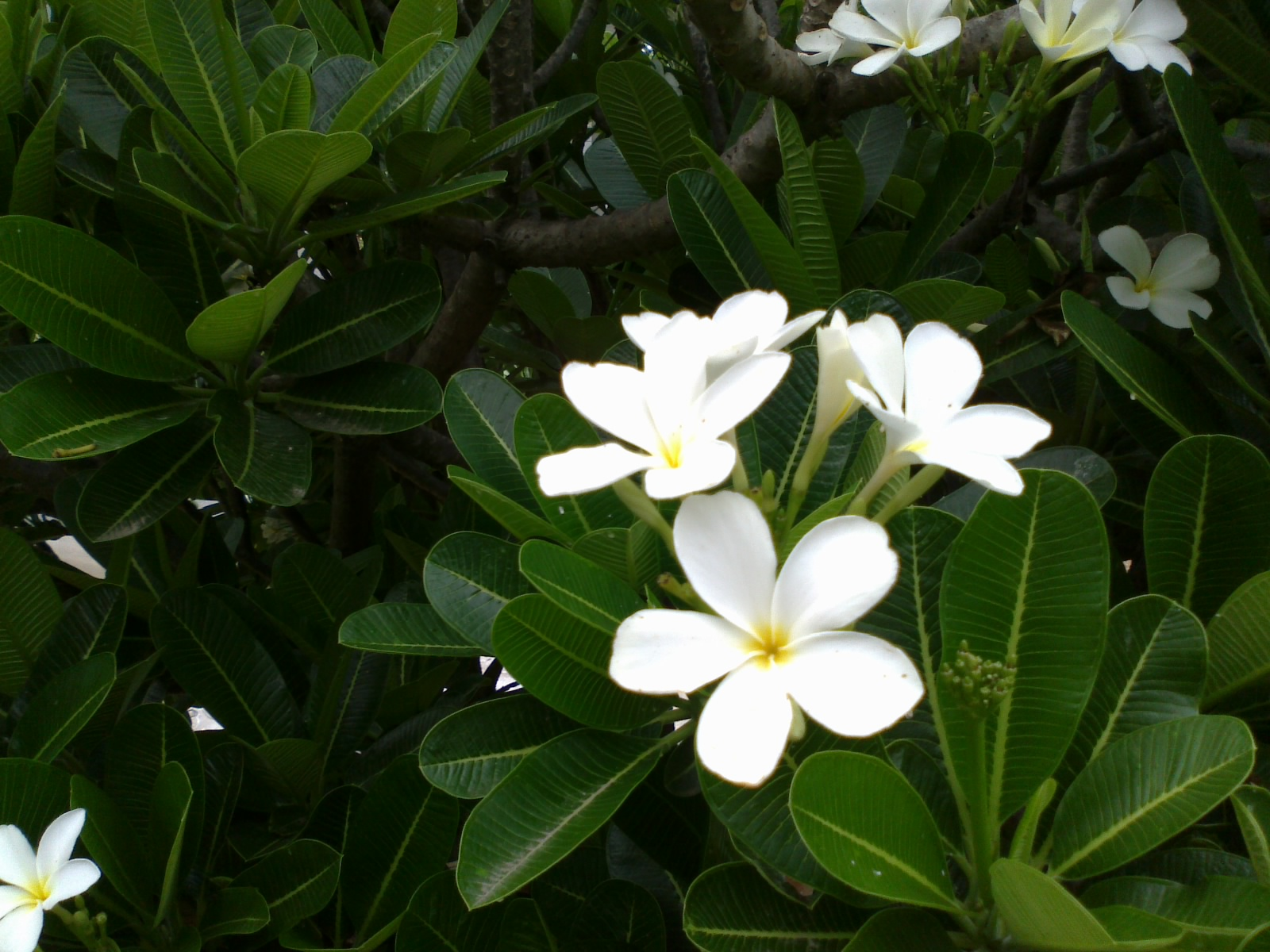
White Plumeria, found at Andhra Pradesh

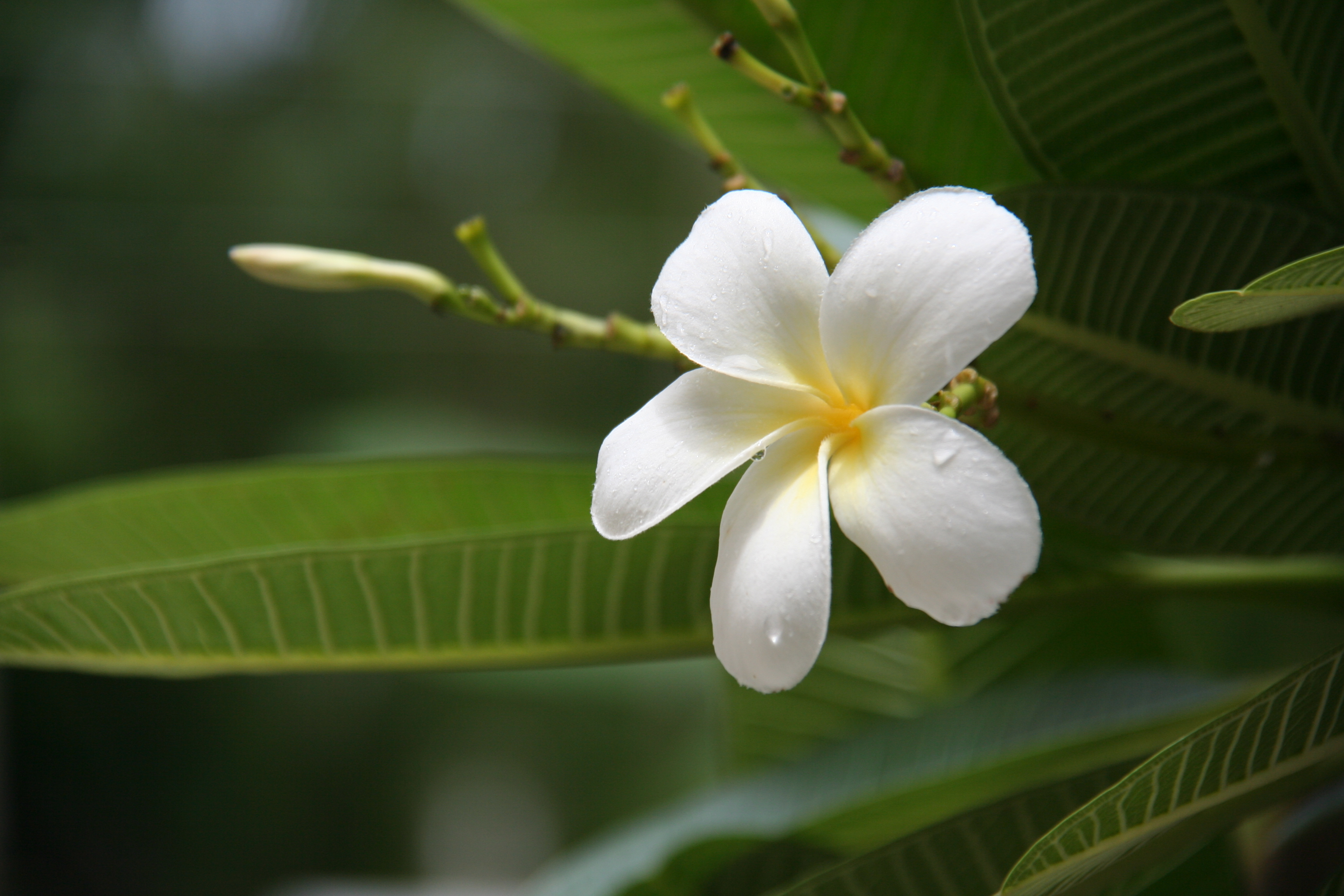
White Plumeria, Kozhikode, Kerala

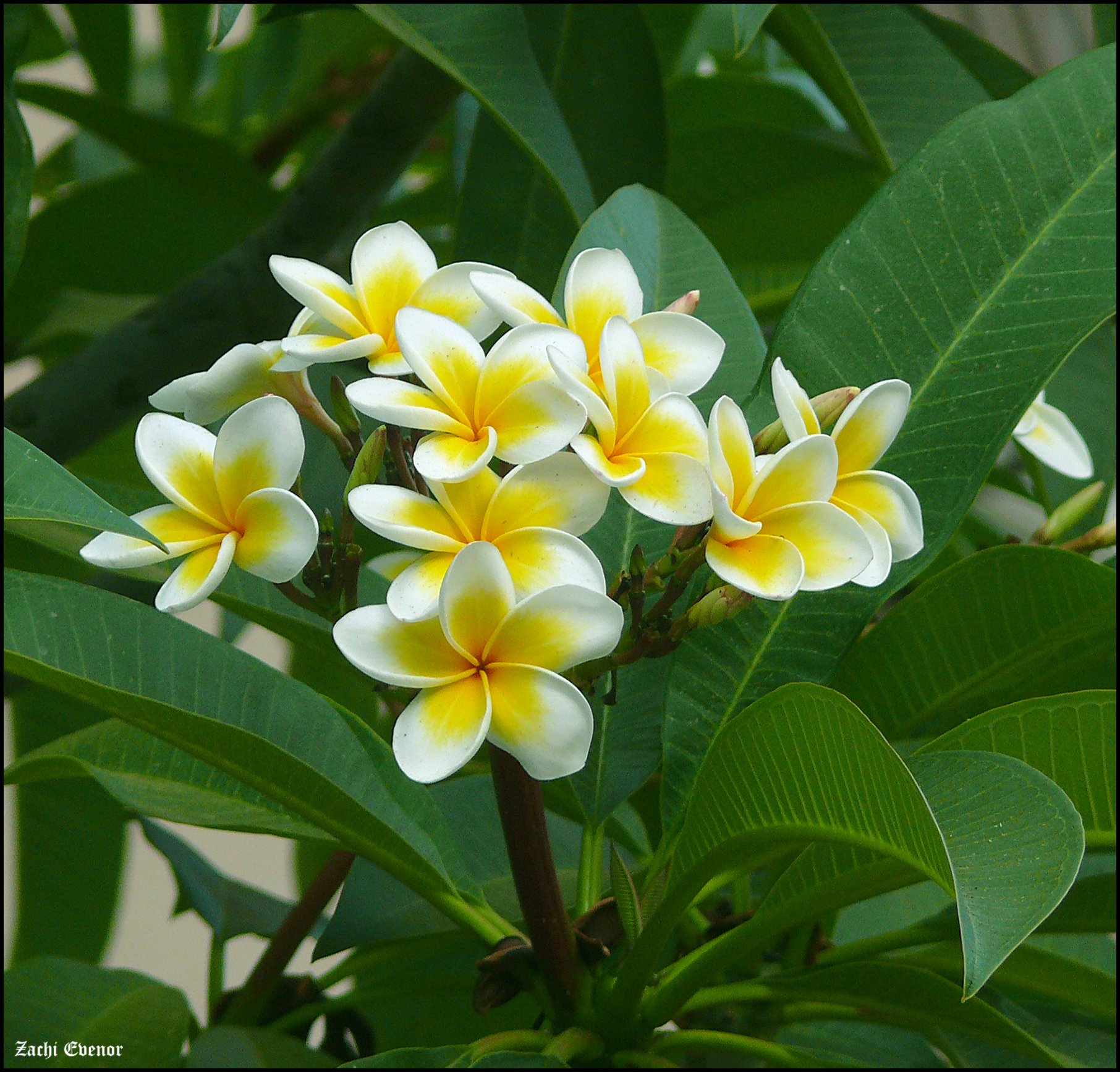
Plumeria rubra in Israel

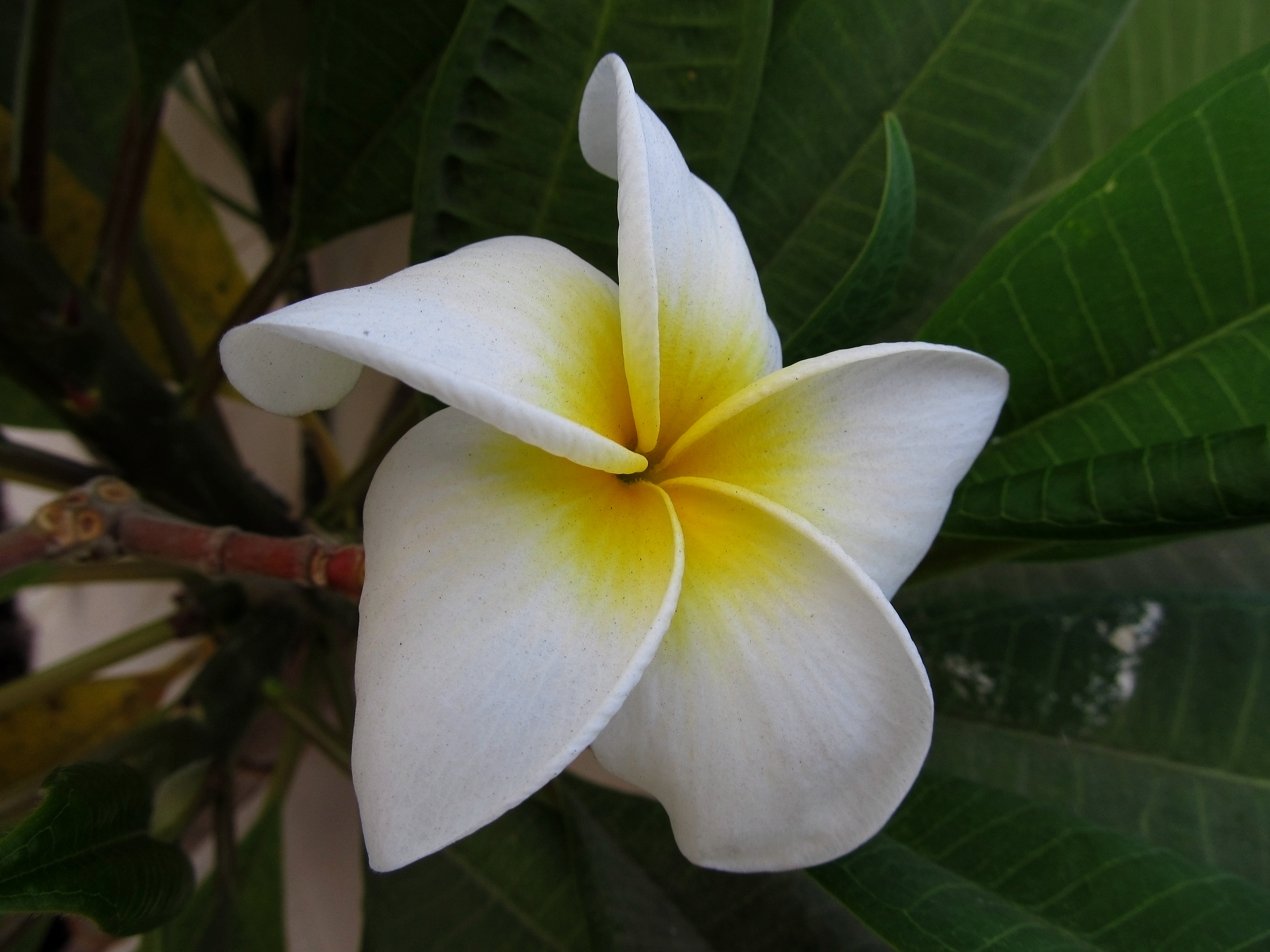
Plumeria (Indian Champa) in Surat, India

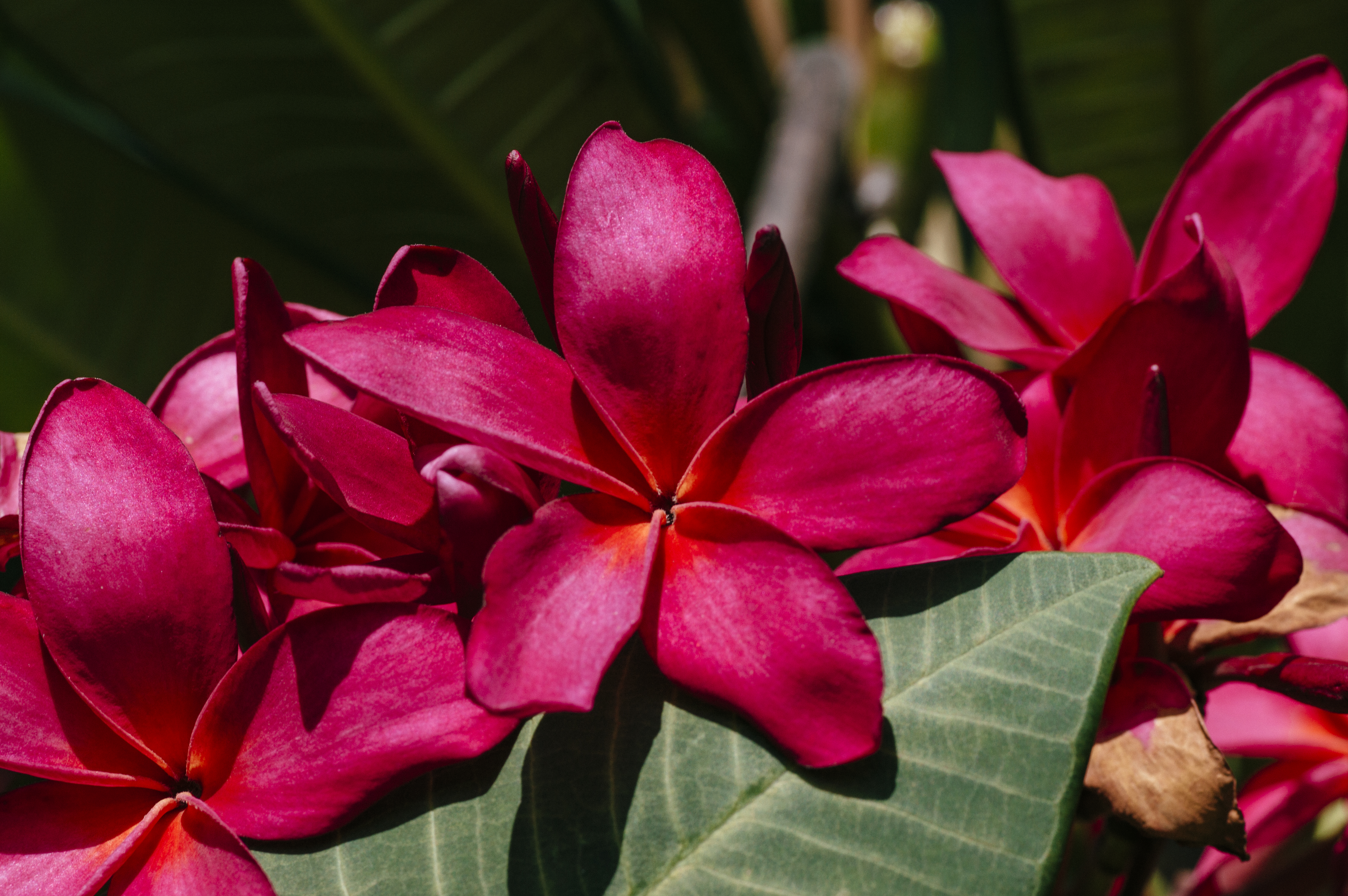
Hot pink frangipani in full bloom

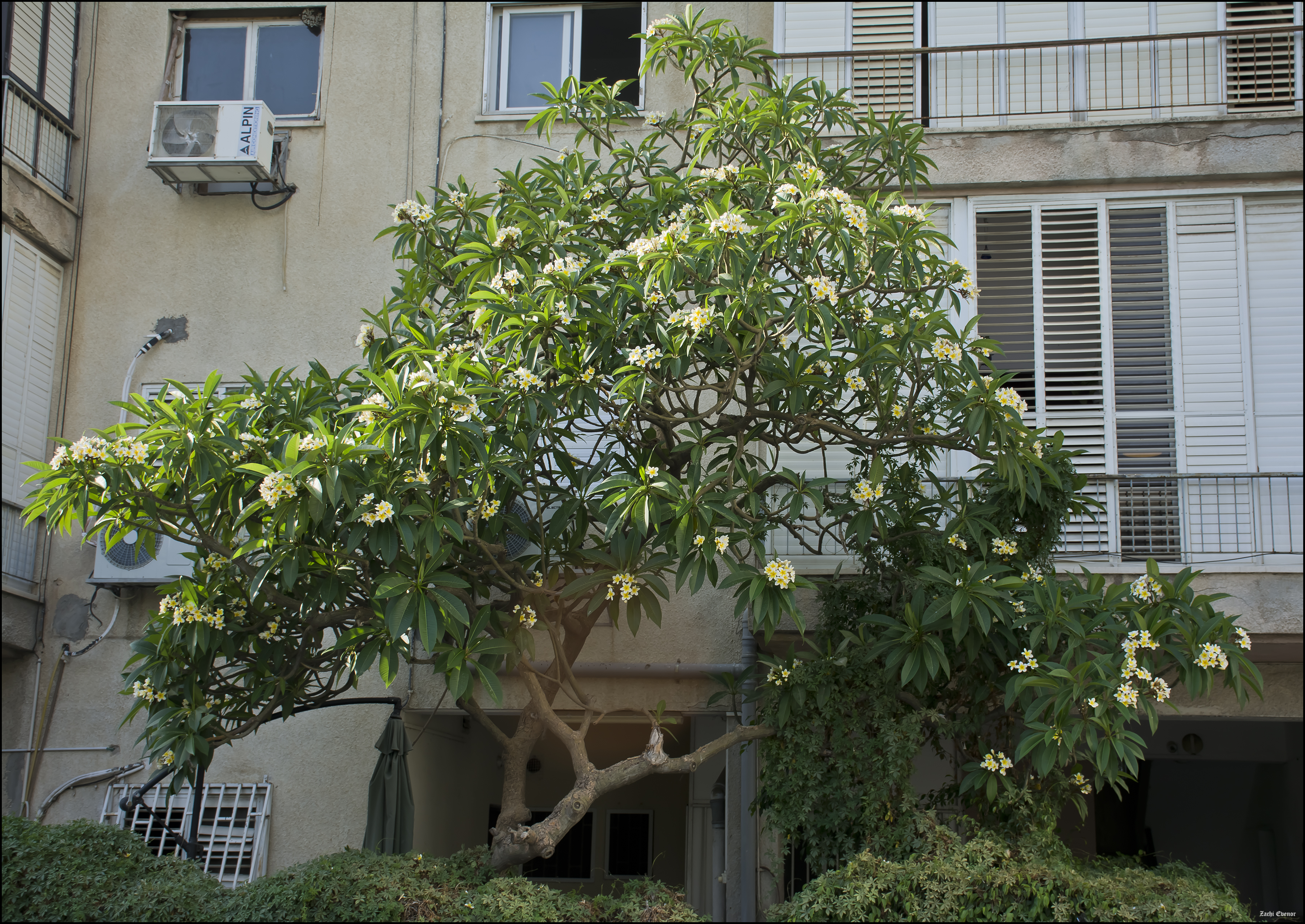
Flowering tree of Plumeria rubra decorating a garden in Tel Aviv, Israel
