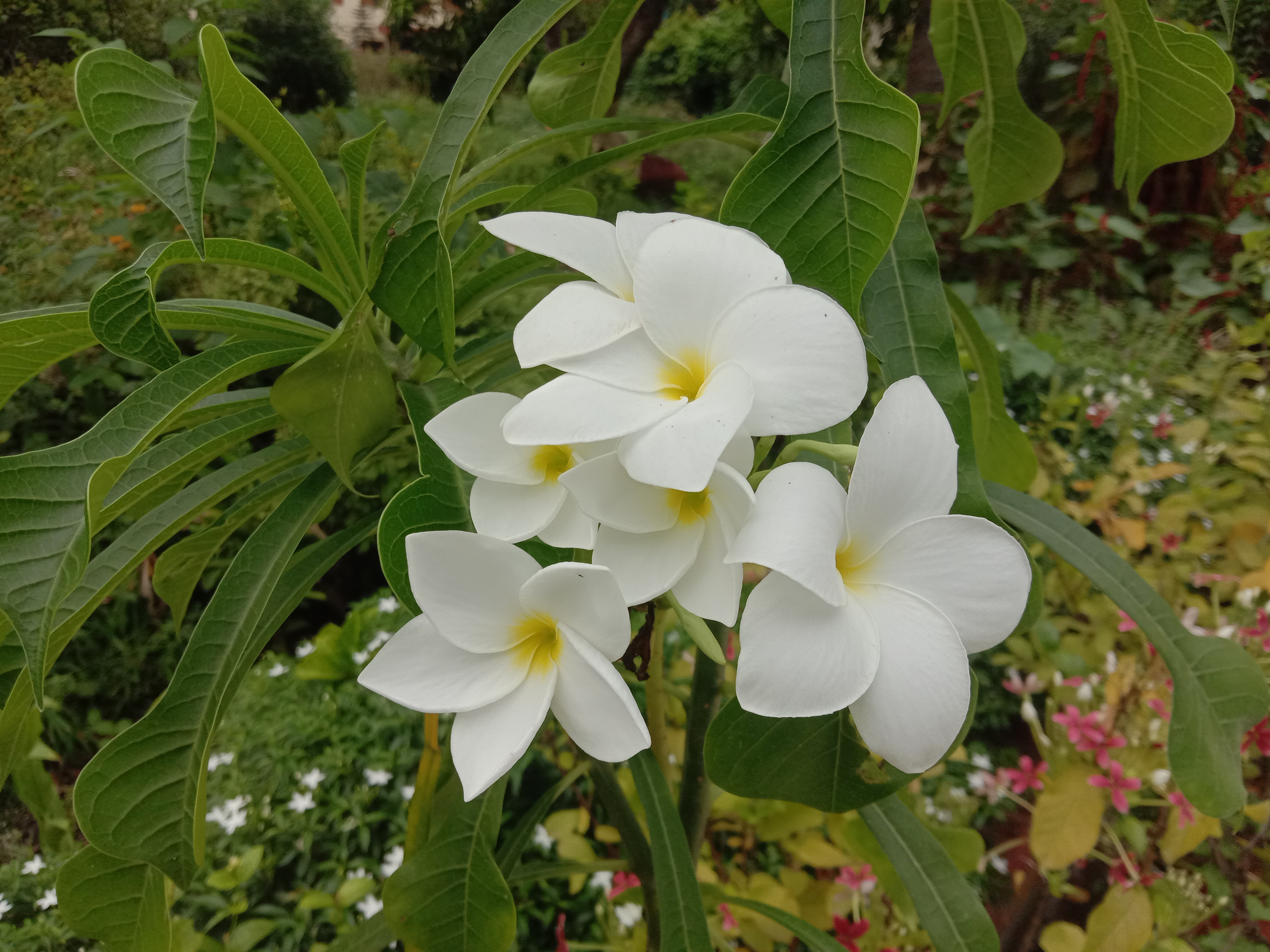

Conservation status
- Least Concern (IUCN 3.1)

Scientific classification
- Kingdom: Plantae
- Clade: Tracheophytes
- Clade: Angiosperms
- Clade: Eudicots
- Clade: Asterids
- Order: Gentianales
- Family: Apocynaceae
- Genus: Plumeria
- Species: P. pudica

Binomial name
- Plumeria pudica Jacq.

= Plumeria pudica =

Species of tree

Plumeria pudica is a species of the genus Plumeria (Apocynaceae), native to Panama, Colombia and Venezuela. This profuse bloomer has leaves in the shape of a cobra's hood, and its flowers are white with a yellow center.

There is a variegated leaved Plumeria pudica commonly called Golden Arrow or Gilded Spoon, as well as a pink flowering hybrid produced in Thailand called Sri Supakorn or Pink pudica.

== Description ==
Plumeria pudica is a deciduous shrub that can reach a height of 3–4 metres (9.8–13.1 feet). It is of medium size, its trunk rather thin, branches from the base, into multiple branches that form a dense and slightly flared crown. The leaves are curiously spatulate, long, thick, spoon-shaped, of a shiny dark green. They are toxic like all Plumeria leaves. The white flowers have very little scent.

== Biochemistry ==
Latex proteins from Plumeria pudica have been studied in mice as a potential treatment for periodontitis and use as an antioxidant.

== Common names ==
- Bridal bouquet
- White frangipani
- Fiddle leaf plumeria
- Wild plumeria
- Bonairian oleander
- Thai champa (Urdu)
- Naag (cobra) champa (Bengali)
- நாவில்லா அரளி ("naavilla arali") (Tamil)

== Gallery ==
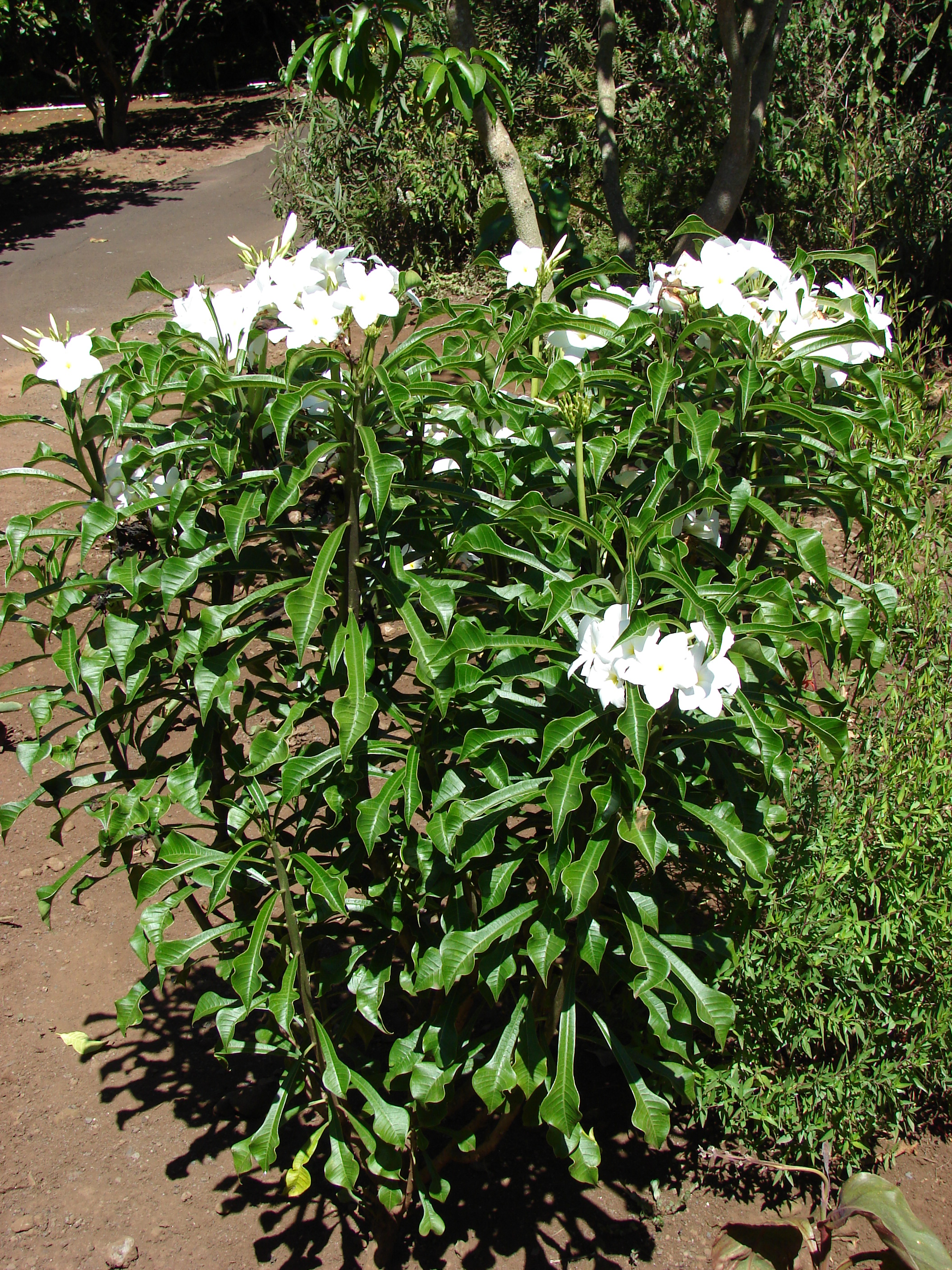
Growth habit

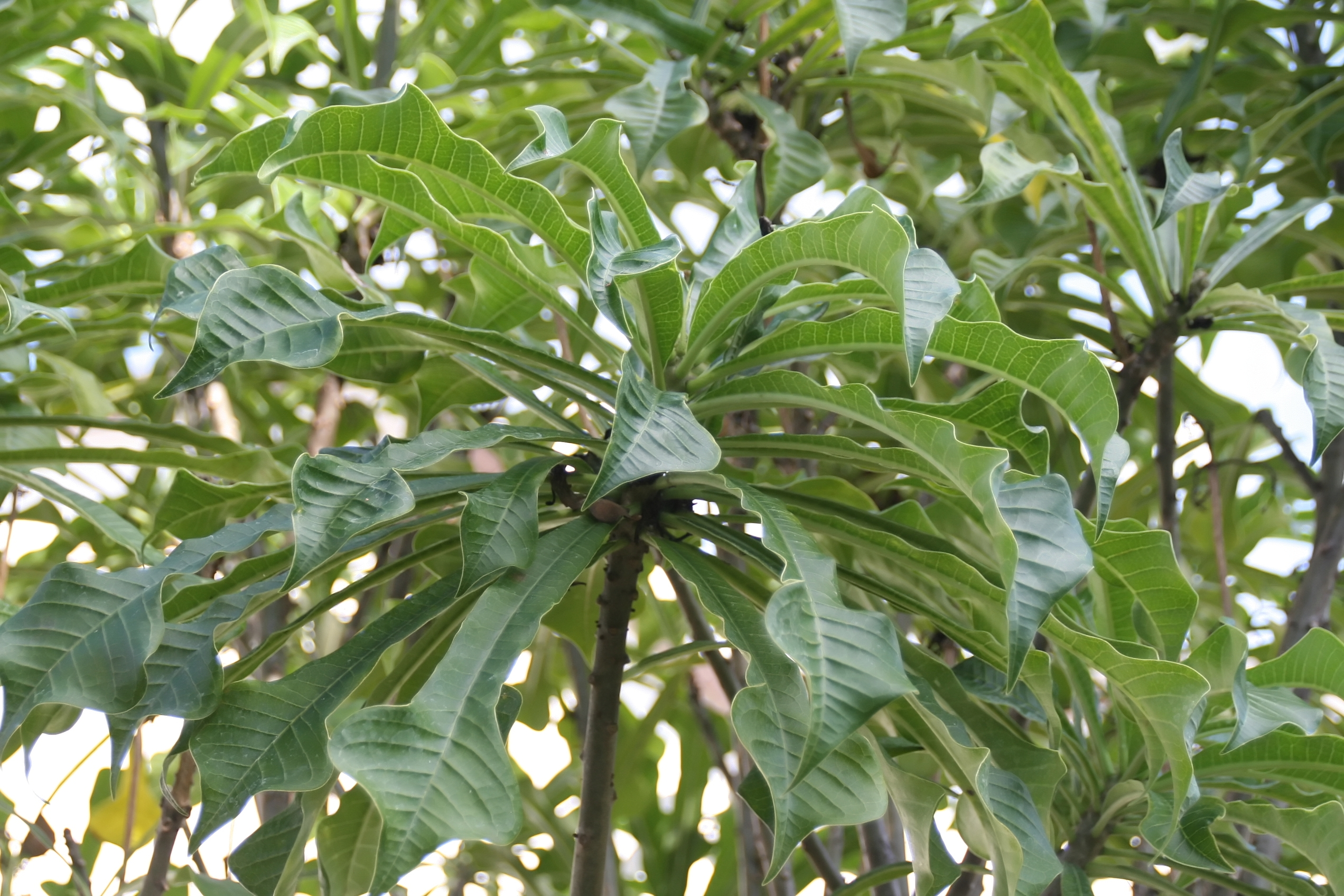
Foliage

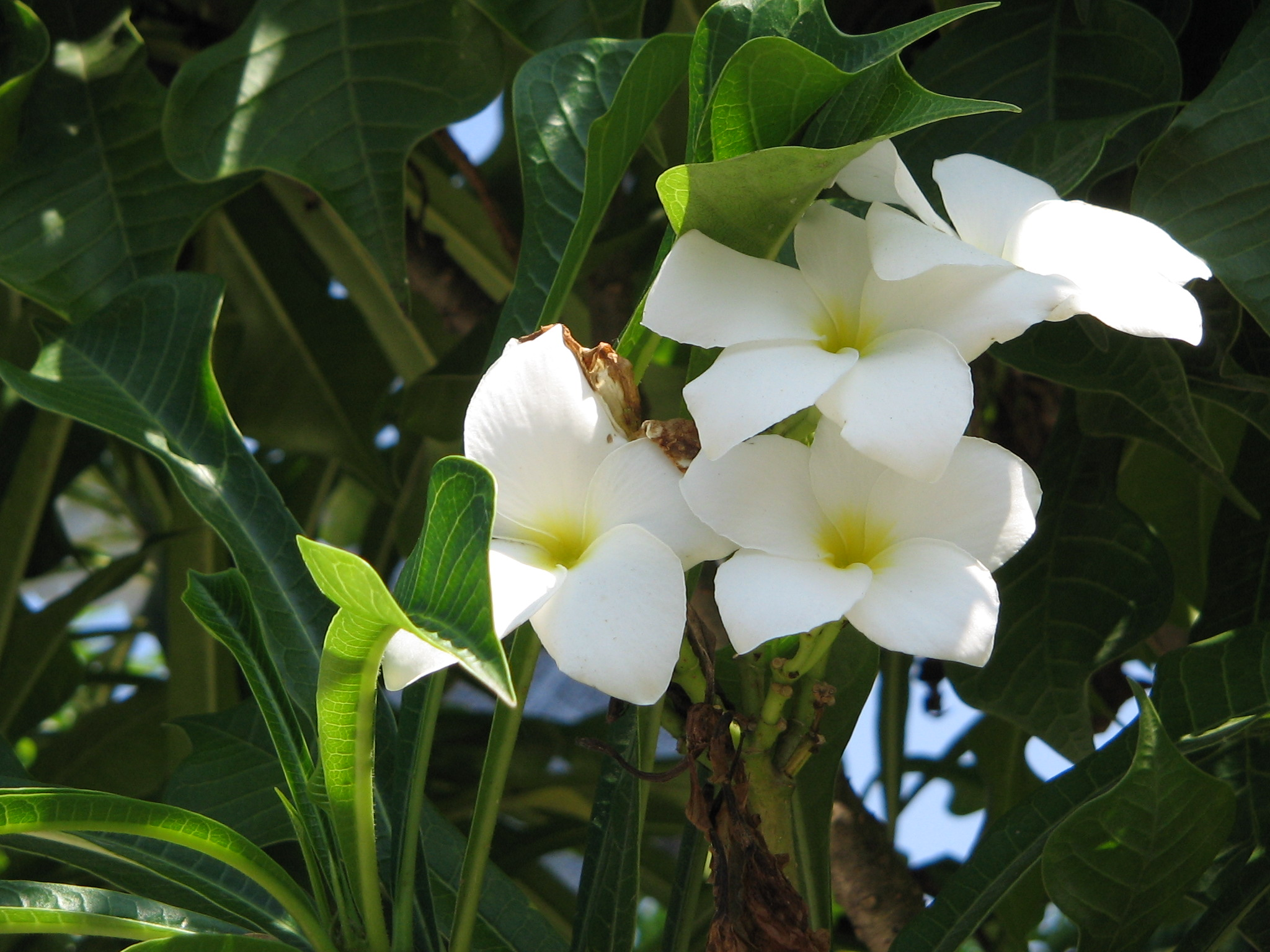
Flowers

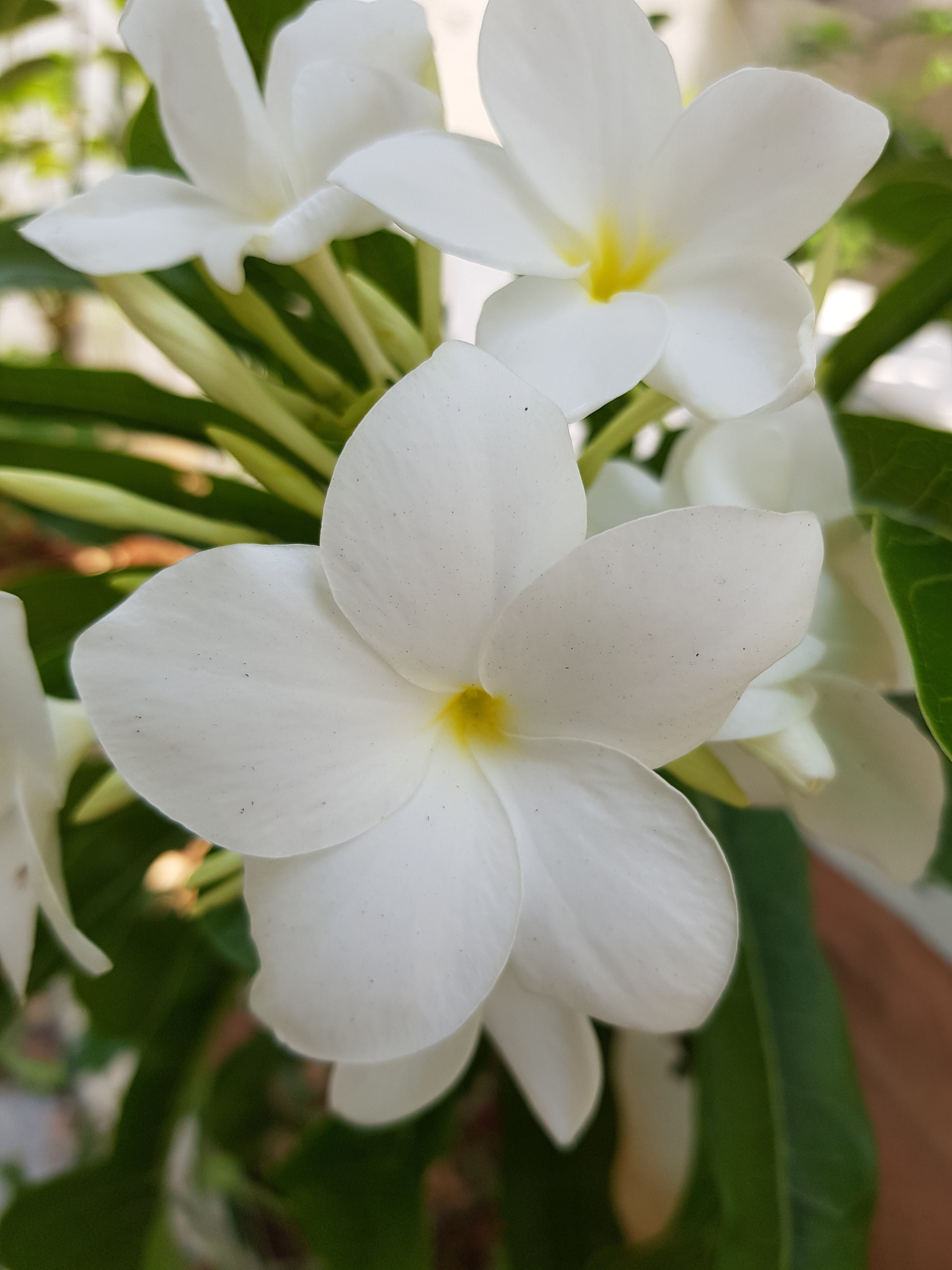
Flowers and buds

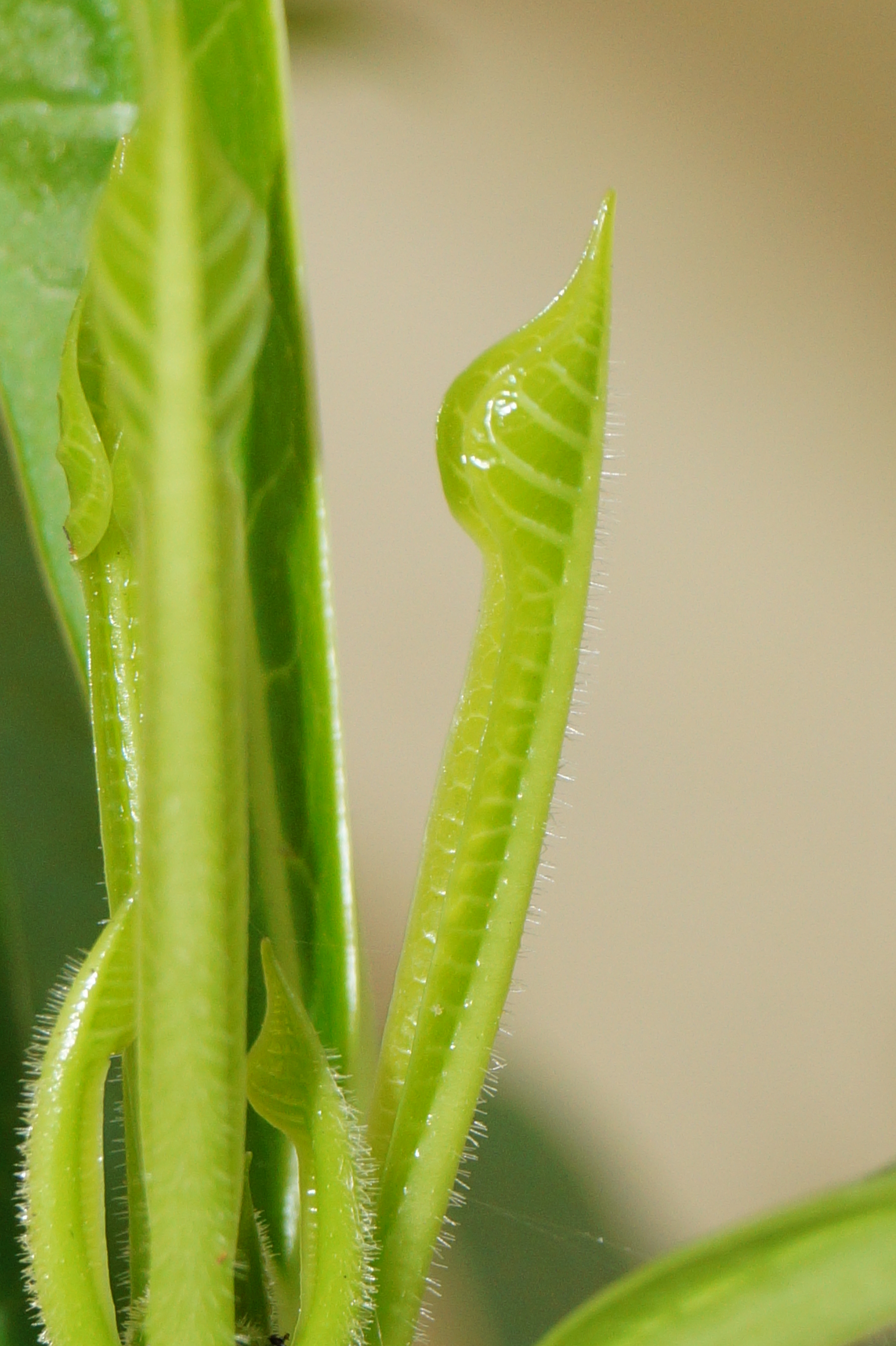
Young leaf

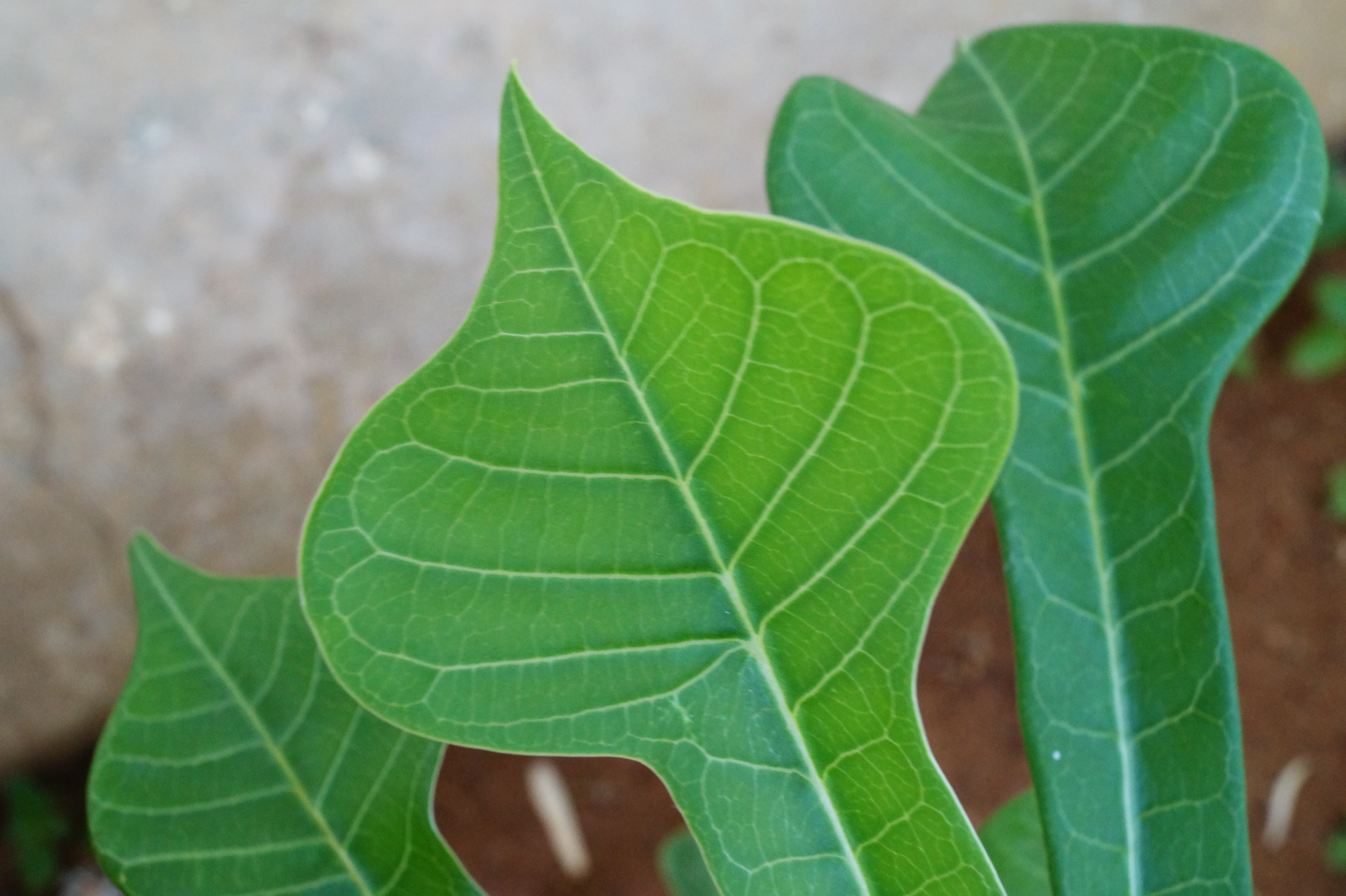
Gilded spoon leaf tips

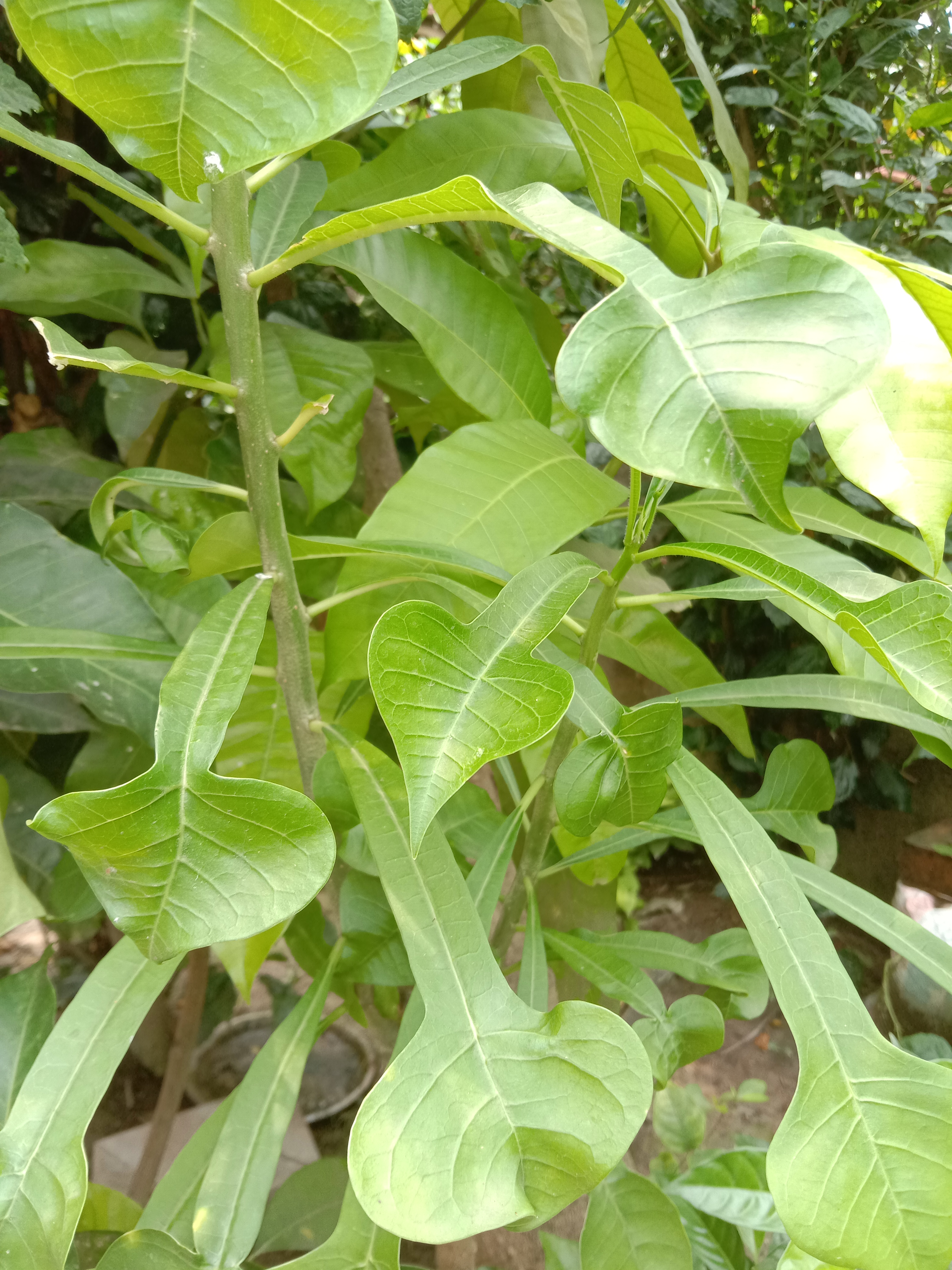
Leaves in West Bengal, India

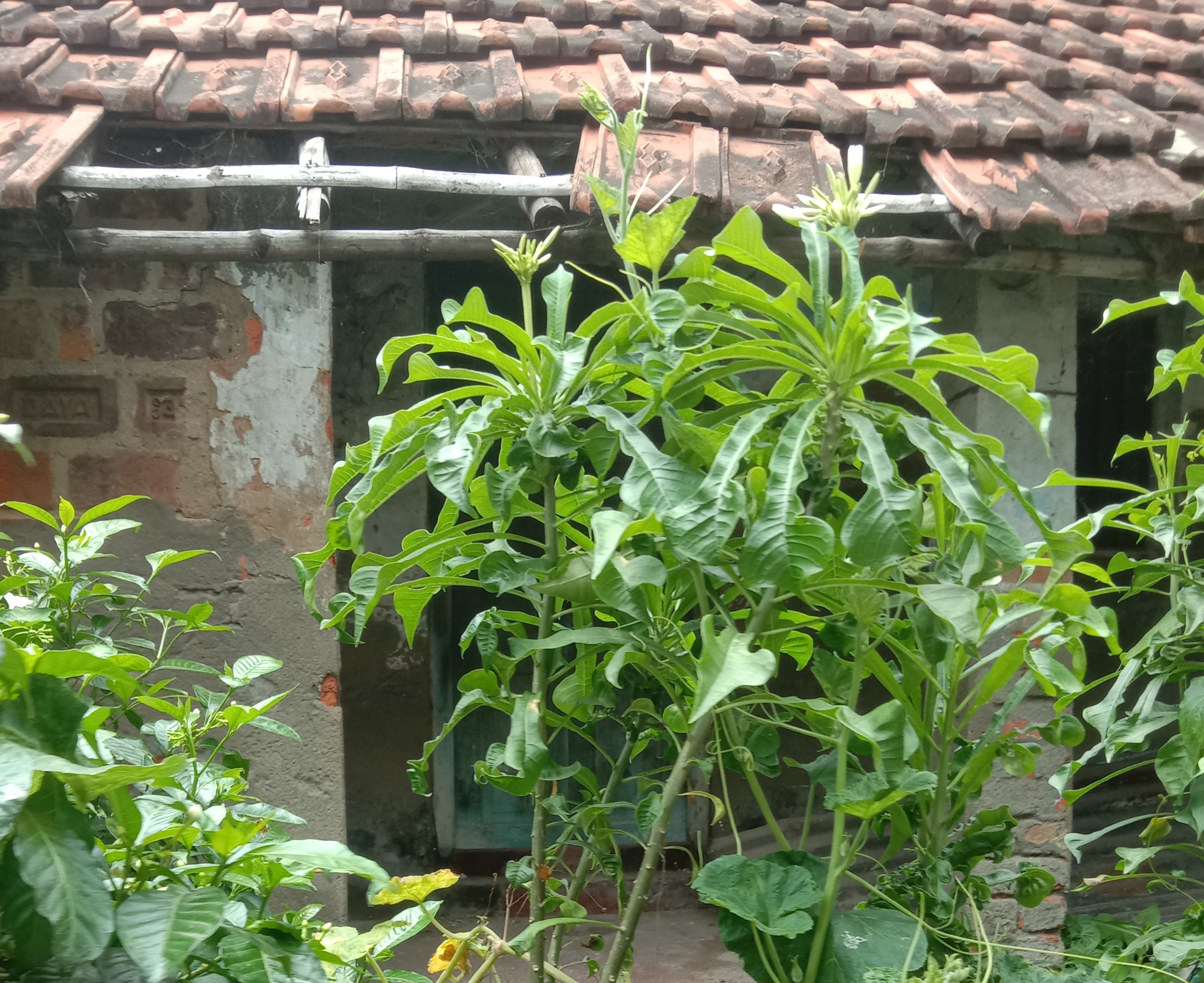
Plants and flowers in India

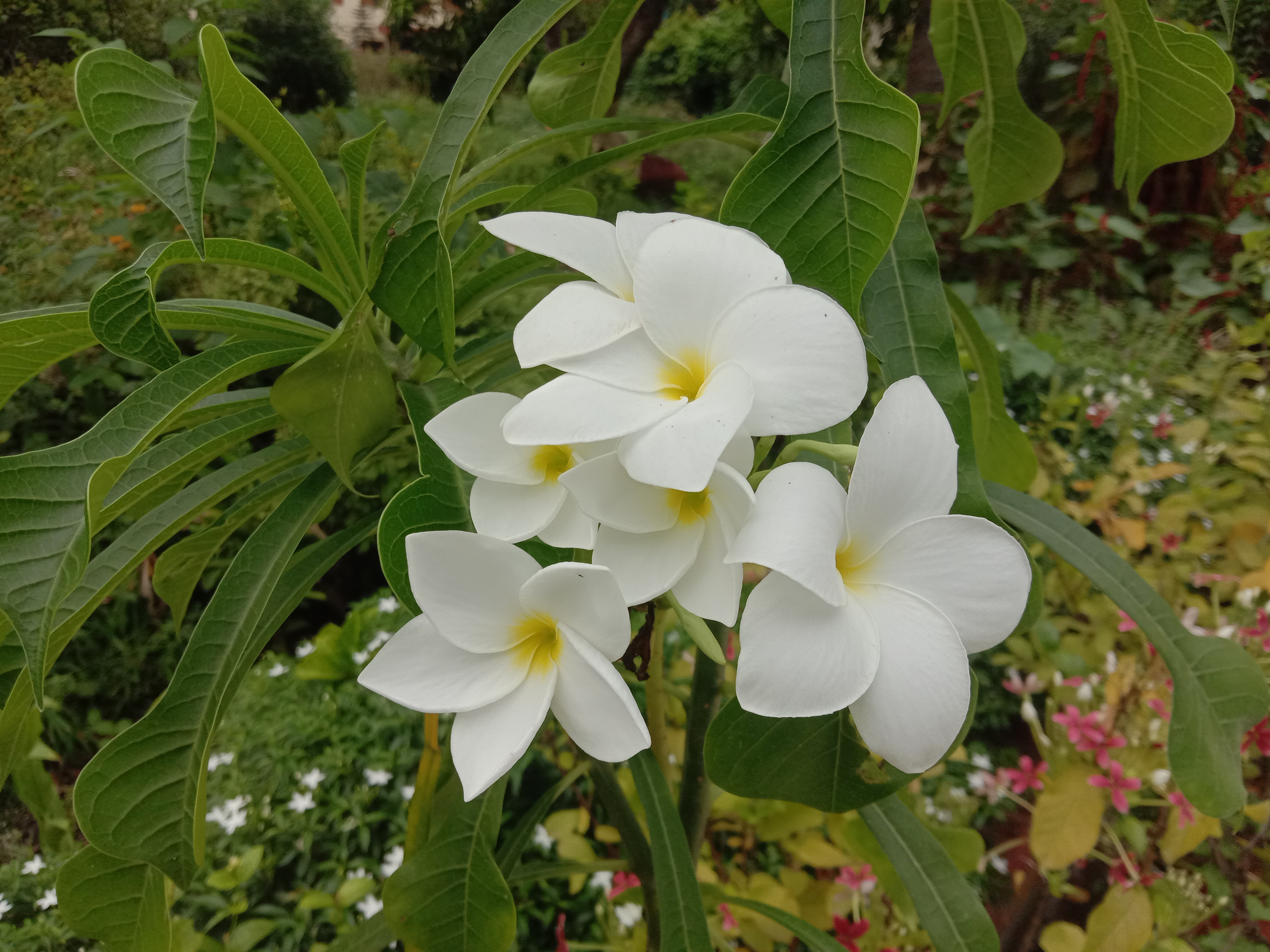
Flowers of Plumeria pudica in West Bengal, India.
