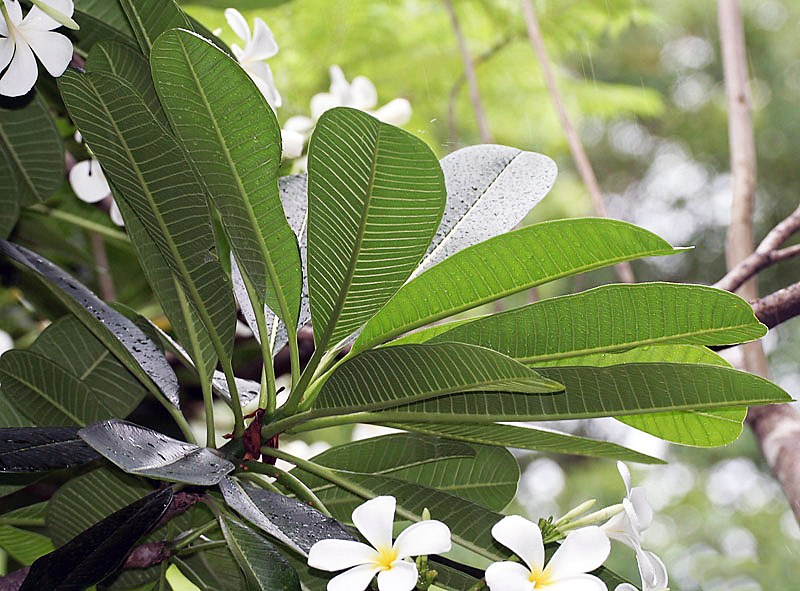
- Leaves in Kolkata, West Bengal, India.

Conservation status
- Least Concern (IUCN 3.1)

Scientific classification
- Kingdom: Plantae
- Clade: Embryophytes
- Clade: Tracheophytes
- Clade: Spermatophytes
- Clade: Angiosperms
- Clade: Eudicots
- Clade: Asterids
- Order: Gentianales
- Family: Apocynaceae
- Genus: Plumeria
- Species: P. obtusa

Binomial name
- Plumeria obtusa L.

Synonyms
- 27 synonyms: Plumeria apiculata Urb.; Plumeria bahamensis Urb.; Plumeria barahonensis Urb.; Plumeria beatensis Urb.; Plumeria bicolor Seem.; Plumeria casildensis Urb.; Plumeria cayensis Urb.; Plumeria confusa Britton; Plumeria cuneifolia Helwig; Plumeria emarginata var. sericifolia (C.Wright ex Griseb.) M.Gómez; Plumeria estrellensis Urb.; Plumeria hypoleuca Gasp.; Plumeria inaguensis Britton; Plumeria jamaicensis Britton; Plumeria marchii Urb.; Plumeria multiflora Standl.; Plumeria nipensis Britton; Plumeria nivea Mill.; Plumeria obtusa var. laevis Griseb.; Plumeria obtusa var. sericifolia (C.Wright ex Griseb.) Woodson; Plumeria ostenfeldii Urb.; Plumeria parvifolia Donn; Plumeria portoricensis Urb.; Plumeria sericifolia C.Wright ex Griseb.; Plumeria tenorei Gazparr.; Plumeria tuberculata subsp. sericifolia (C.Wright ex Griseb.) Borhidi; Plumeria versicolor Dehnh.

= Plumeria obtusa =

Species of tree

Plumeria obtusa, the Singapore graveyard flower, is a species of the genus Plumeria (Apocynaceae). It is native to the Neotropics, but widely cultivated for its ornamental and fragrant flowers around the world, where suitably warm climate exists.

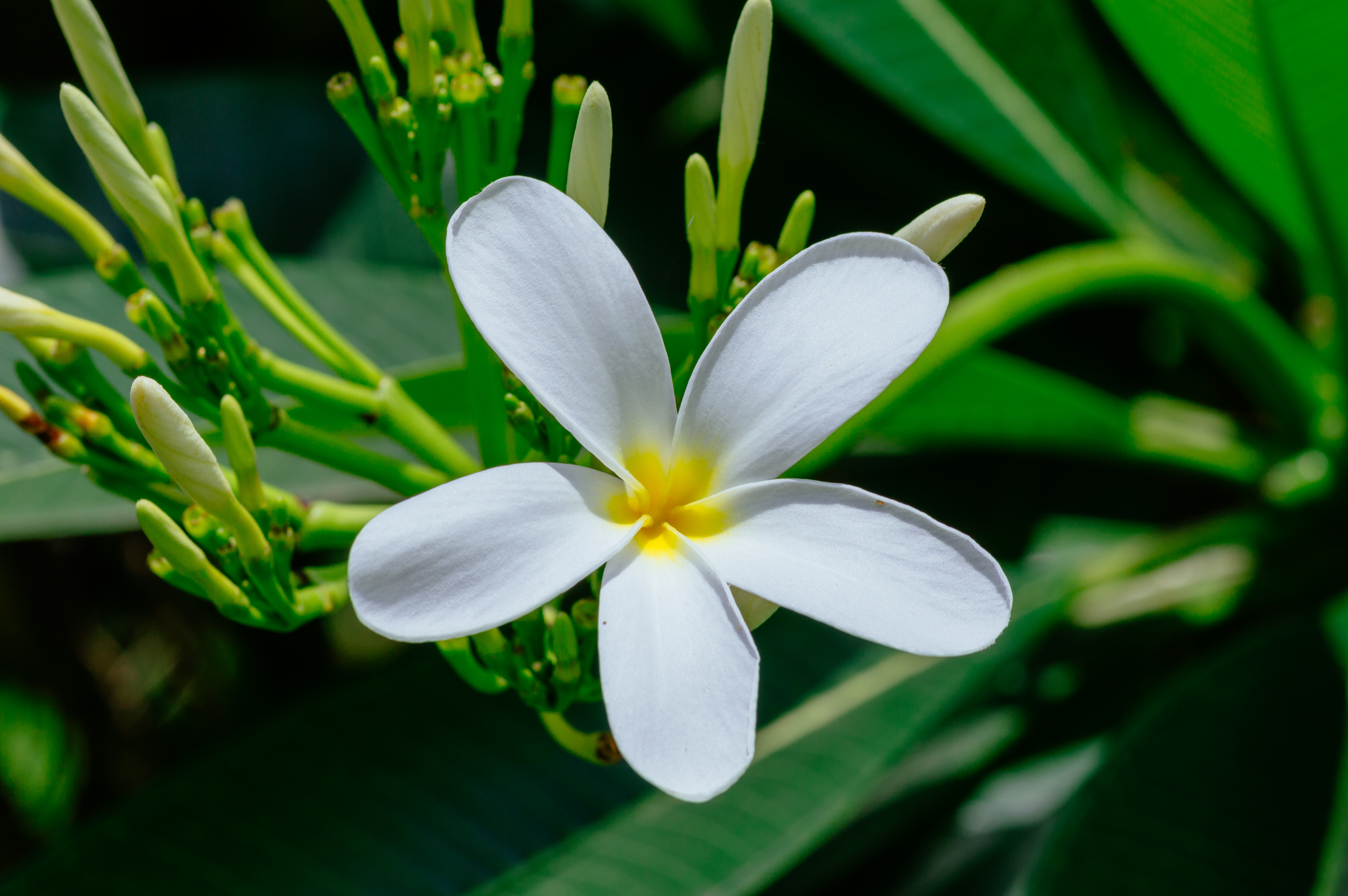
Closeup of Singapore graveyard flower in Jamshedpur

== Taxonomy ==
Plumeria obtusa was described as a new species in 1753 by Carl Linnaeus. Its specific epithet "obtusa" means "blunt", in reference to its blunt-tipped leaves.

== Description ==
Plumeria obtusa is a small tree, growing 3.0–4.6 m (10–15 ft) tall. Infrequently, individuals can grow to be 7.6 m (25 ft). Its flowers are white with yellow throats and each has five petals. The fragrant flowers bloom in clusters. Leaves are dark green, glossy, and up to 20 cm (8 in) long. They are obovate, or teardrop-shaped.

== Distribution ==
Plumeria obtusa is native to the West Indies (including the Bahamas and the Greater Antilles), southern Mexico, Belize, and Guatemala. Cultivation is common in warmer parts of the world, including Florida, Southeast Asia, and coastal parts of the Arabian Peninsula. It is reportedly naturalized in China and India.

== Common names ==
- châmpéi slük tiel - Khmer
- gulcampā - Dhivehi

== Uses ==
This plant is commonly used as an ornamental, grown for its flowers. In Cambodia the flowers are used to make necklaces and in offerings to the deities. In traditional medicine used in that country, a decoction of the bark is given in varying doses as a purgative or as a remedy against oedema.
