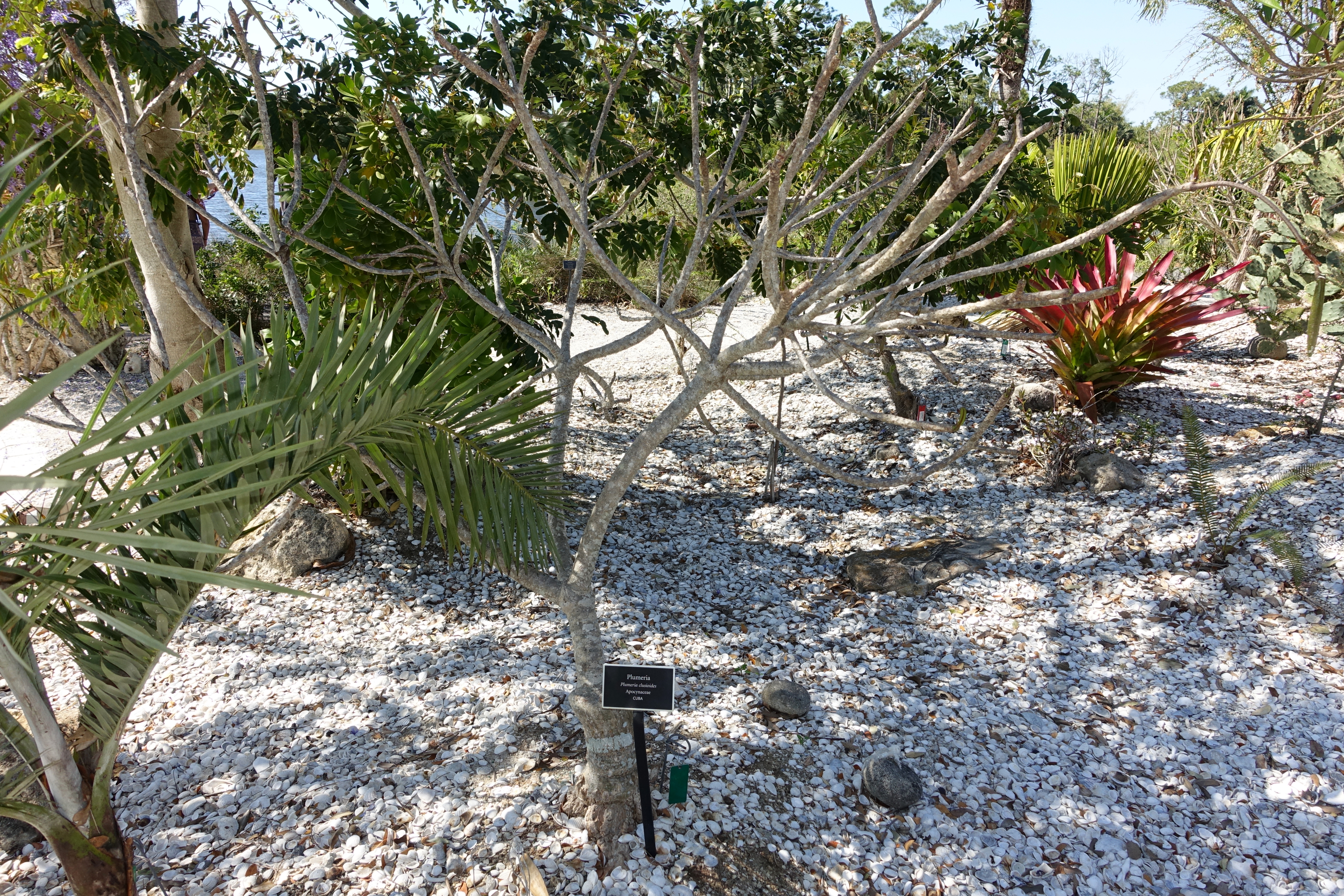

Scientific classification
- Kingdom: Plantae
- Clade: Tracheophytes
- Clade: Angiosperms
- Clade: Eudicots
- Clade: Asterids
- Order: Gentianales
- Family: Apocynaceae
- Genus: Plumeria
- Species: P. clusioides

Binomial name
- Plumeria clusioides Griseb.

= Plumeria clusioides =

Species of tree

Plumeria clusioides is a species of flowering plant in the family Apocynaceae. It is endemic to the Island of Cuba.
