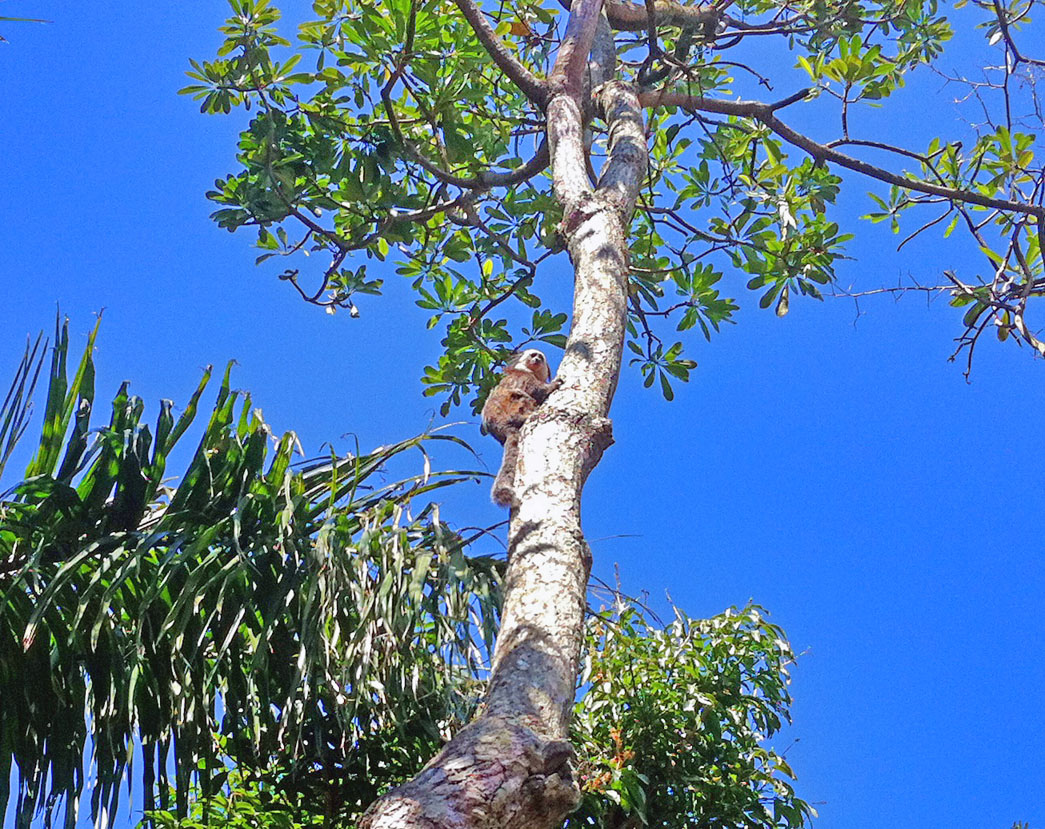

Scientific classification
- Kingdom: Plantae
- Clade: Tracheophytes
- Clade: Angiosperms
- Clade: Eudicots
- Clade: Asterids
- Order: Gentianales
- Family: Apocynaceae
- Genus: Himatanthus
- Species: H. bracteatus

Binomial name
- Himatanthus bracteatus (A.DC.) Woodson

Synonyms
- Plumeria bracteata A.DC.

= Himatanthus bracteatus =

Species of plant

Himatanthus bracteatus is a species of the genus Himatanthus (Apocynaceae), native Venezuela, Colombia, the Guianas, Brazil, Peru, and Ecuador. It is a shrub with oblong, obovate and acuminate leaves, white flowers in terminal corymbs and follicles with winged seed.

== Names ==
- In Portuguese, it is called janaúba, angélica-da-mata and banana-de-papagaio.
