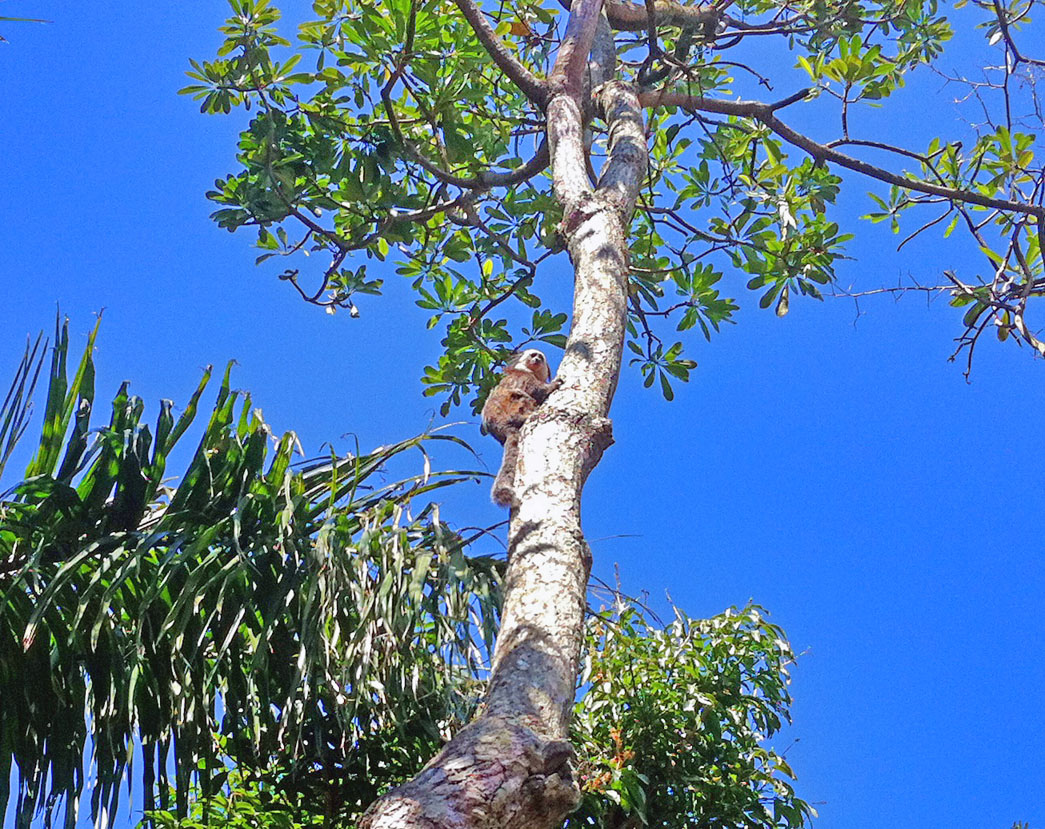
- Himatanthus bracteatus

Scientific classification
- Kingdom: Plantae
- Clade: Tracheophytes
- Clade: Angiosperms
- Clade: Eudicots
- Clade: Asterids
- Order: Gentianales
- Family: Apocynaceae
- Subfamily: Rauvolfioideae
- Tribe: Plumerieae
- Subtribe: Plumeriinae
- Genus: Himatanthus; Willd. ex Schult.

= Himatanthus =

Genus of plants

Himatanthus is a genus of flowering plant in the family Apocynaceae, first described as a genus in 1819. It is native to Panama and South America.

Species

1. Himatanthus articulatus (Vahl) Woodson - widespread from Panama east to French Guiana and south to Bolivia
2. Himatanthus attenuatus (Benth.) Woodson - Venezuela, Colombia, N Brazil
3. Himatanthus bracteatus (A.DC.) Woodson - Venezuela, Colombia, Guianas, Brazil, Peru, Ecuador
4. Himatanthus drasticus (Mart.) Plumel - Guianas, Brazil
5. Himatanthus lancifolius (Müll.Arg.) Woodson
6. Himatanthus obovatus (Müll.Arg.) Woodson - Brazil, Bolivia, Guyana
7. Himatanthus phagedaenicus (Mart.) Woodson - S Venezuela, NW Brazil
8. Himatanthus semilunatus Markgr. - Amazon Basin
9. Himatanthus stenophyllus Plumel - Colombia, NW Brazil, Guyana, Suriname
10. Himatanthus tarapotensis (K.Schum. ex Markgr.) Plumel - Colombia, Bolivia, Brazil, Peru, Ecuador
