= Himatanthus stenophyllus =

Conservation status
- Data Deficient (IUCN 2.3)

Scientific classification
- Kingdom: Plantae
- Clade: Tracheophytes
- Clade: Angiosperms
- Clade: Eudicots
- Clade: Asterids
- Order: Gentianales
- Family: Apocynaceae
- Genus: Himatanthus
- Species: H. stenophyllus

Binomial name
- Himatanthus stenophyllus Plumel 1990

Synonyms
- Plumeria revoluta Huber; Himatanthus bracteatus var. revolutus (Huber) Plumel; Himatanthus revolutus (Huber) Spina & L.S. Kinoshita

Species of plant

Himatanthus stenophyllus is a species of plant in the family Apocynaceae. It is native to Colombia, NW Brazil, Guyana, and Suriname.
