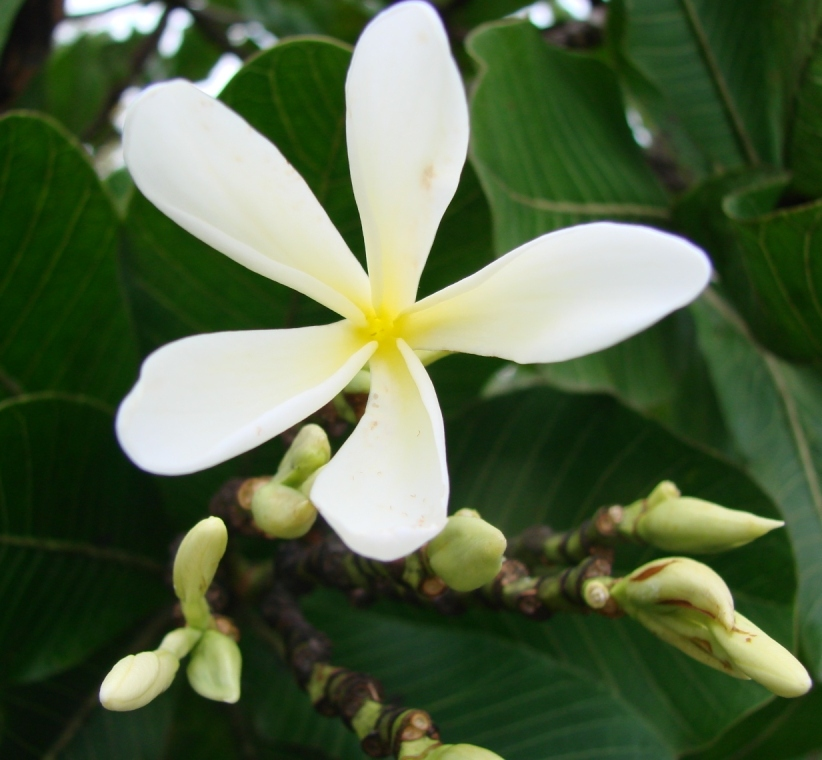

Scientific classification
- Kingdom: Plantae
- Clade: Embryophytes
- Clade: Tracheophytes
- Clade: Angiosperms
- Clade: Eudicots
- Clade: Asterids
- Order: Gentianales
- Family: Apocynaceae
- Genus: Himatanthus
- Species: H. obovatus

Binomial name
- Himatanthus obovatus (Müll.Arg.) Woodson

Synonyms
- Plumeria hilariana Müll.Arg.; Plumeria latifolia Pilg.; Plumeria obovata Müll.Arg.; Plumeria oligoneura Malme; Plumeria puberula Müll.Arg.; Plumeria velutina Müll.Arg.; Plumeria warmingii Müll.Arg.

= Himatanthus obovatus =

Species of plant

Himatanthus obovatus is a species of genus Himatanthus in the family Apocynaceae, which is native Brazil, Bolivia, Guyana. It is common in Cerrado vegetation in Brazil. This plant is cited in Flora Brasiliensis by Carl Friedrich Philipp von Martius.
