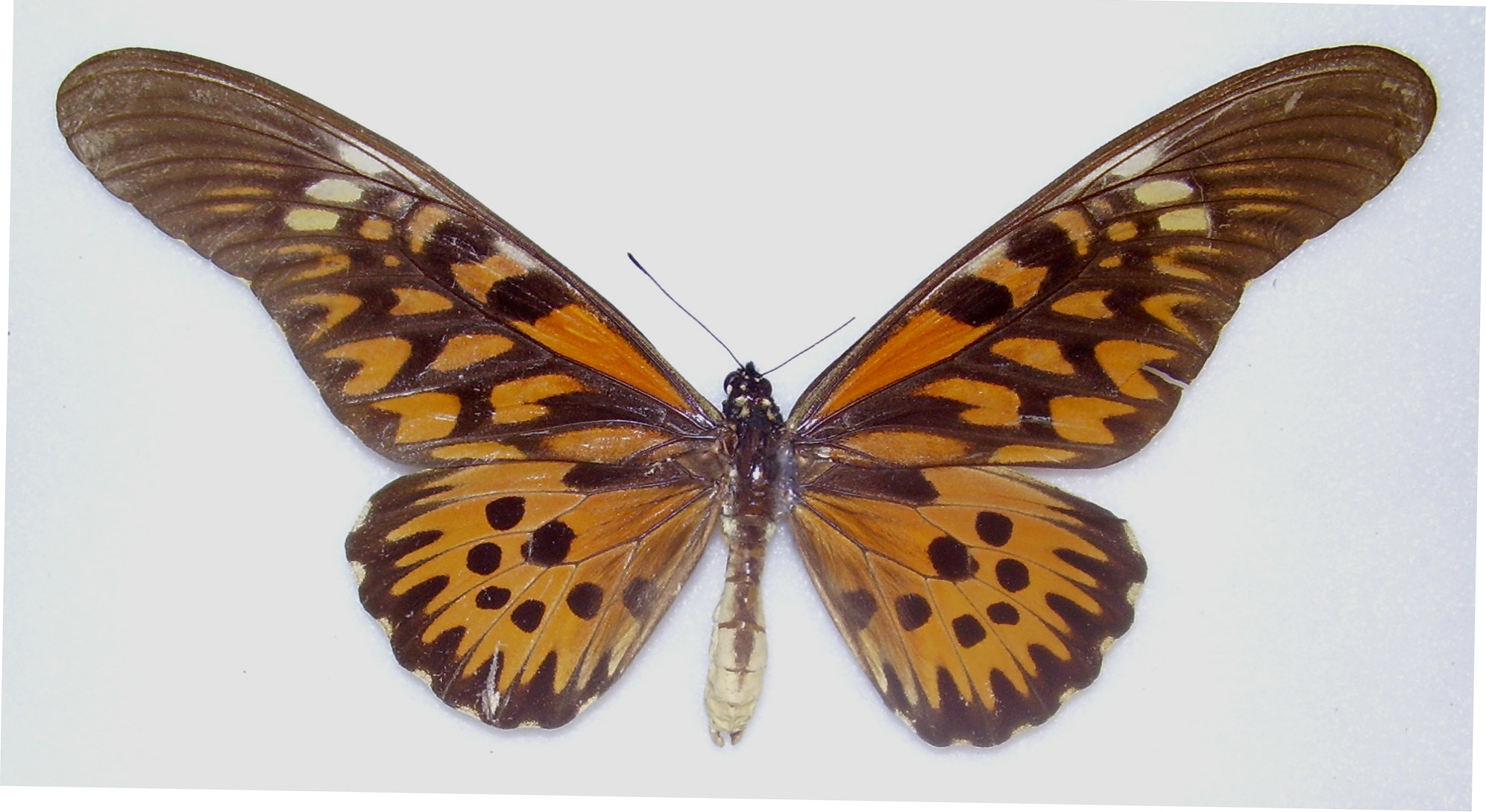
- Papilio antimachus

Scientific classification
- Kingdom: Animalia
- Phylum: Arthropoda
- Clade: Pancrustacea
- Class: Insecta
- Order: Lepidoptera
- Family: Papilionidae
- Genus: Papilio
- Subgenus: Druryia; Aurivillius, 1881

= Druryia =

Subgenus of insects

Druryia is a subgenus within the genus Papilio containing 36 species:

- Papilio andronicus Ward, 1871
- Papilio antimachus Drury, 1782
- Papilio arnoldiana Vane-Wright, 1995
- Papilio charopus Westwood, 1843
- Papilio chitondensis Bivar de Sousa & Fernandes, 1966
- Papilio chrapkowskii Süffert, 1904
- Papilio chrapkowskoides Storace, 1952
- Papilio cynorta Fabricius, 1793
- Papilio cyproeofila Butler, 1868
- Papilio desmondi Van Someren, 1939
- Papilio echerioides Trimen, 1868
- Papilio epiphorbas Boisduval, 1833
- Papilio fernandus Fruhstorfer, 1903
- Papilio filaprae Süffert, 1904
- Papilio fuelleborni Karsch, 1900
- Papilio gallienus Distant, 1879
- Papilio hornimani Distant, 1879
- Papilio interjectana Vane-Wright, 1995
- Papilio jacksoni Sharpe, 1891
- Papilio mackinnoni Sharpe, 1891
- Papilio maesseni Berger, 1974
- Papilio manlius Fabricius, 1798
- Papilio mechowi Dewitz, 1881
- Papilio mechowianus Dewitz, 1885
- Papilio microps Storace, 1952 *
- Papilio nerminae Koçak, 1983
- Papilio nireus Linnaeus, 1758
- Papilio oribazus Boisduval, 1836
- Papilio phorbanta Linnaeus, 1771
- Papilio plagiatus Aurivillius, 1898
- Papilio rex Oberthür, 1886
- Papilio sosia Rothschild & Jordan, 1903
- Papilio thuraui Karsch, 1900
- Papilio ufipa Carcasson, 1961
- Papilio zalmoxis Hewitson, 1864
- Papilio zenobia Fabricius, 1775
