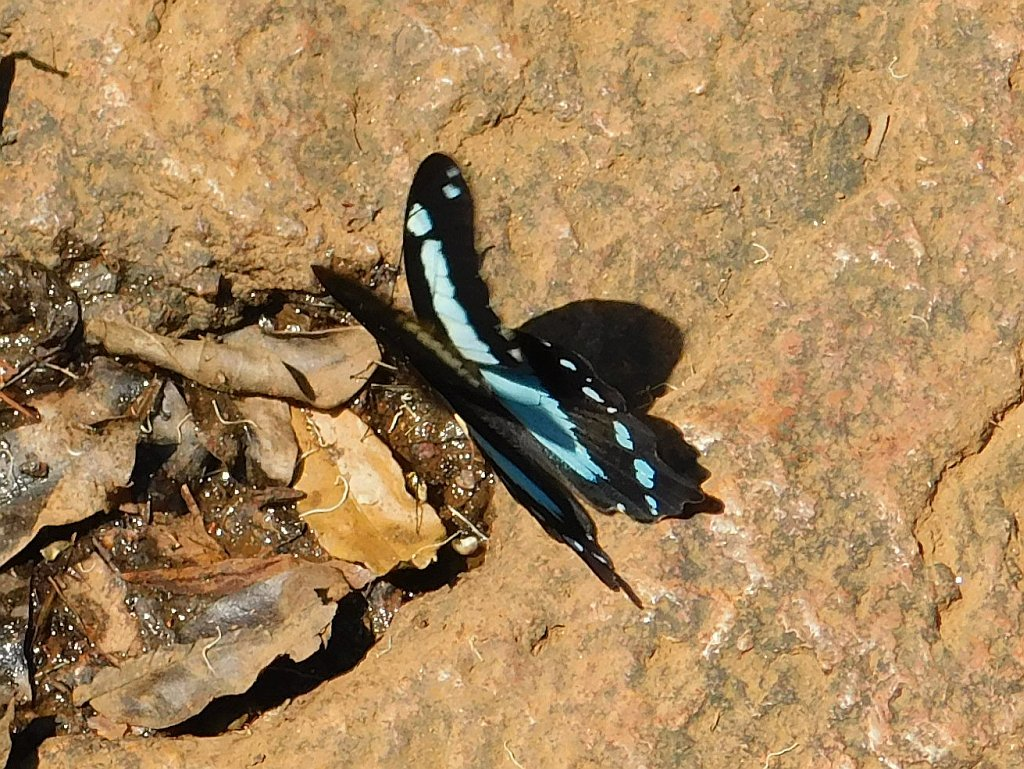

Scientific classification
- Kingdom: Animalia
- Phylum: Arthropoda
- Clade: Pancrustacea
- Class: Insecta
- Order: Lepidoptera
- Family: Papilionidae
- Genus: Papilio
- Species: P. thuraui

Binomial name
- Papilio thuraui Karsch, 1900

Synonyms
- Princeps thuraui occidua f. heathi Hancock, 1984; Princeps thuraui f. viphya Hancock, 1984; Papilio brontes occidentale van Someren, 1960

= Papilio thuraui =

Species of butterfly

Papilio thuraui is a species of swallowtail butterfly from the genus Papilio that is found in Tanzania, Malawi, Zambia and the Republic of the Congo.

== Description ==
Blue median band absent and a complete series of blue submarginal spots in both wings. Both wings above black-brown without median band, but with blue submarginal spots and the forewing also in the middle between the apex of the cell and the distal margin with three small blue spots in cellules 3, 4 and 6; forewing beneath with four large yellowish submarginal spots in cellules 1 b—4. — German East Africa: Ubena. External images

== Original description ==
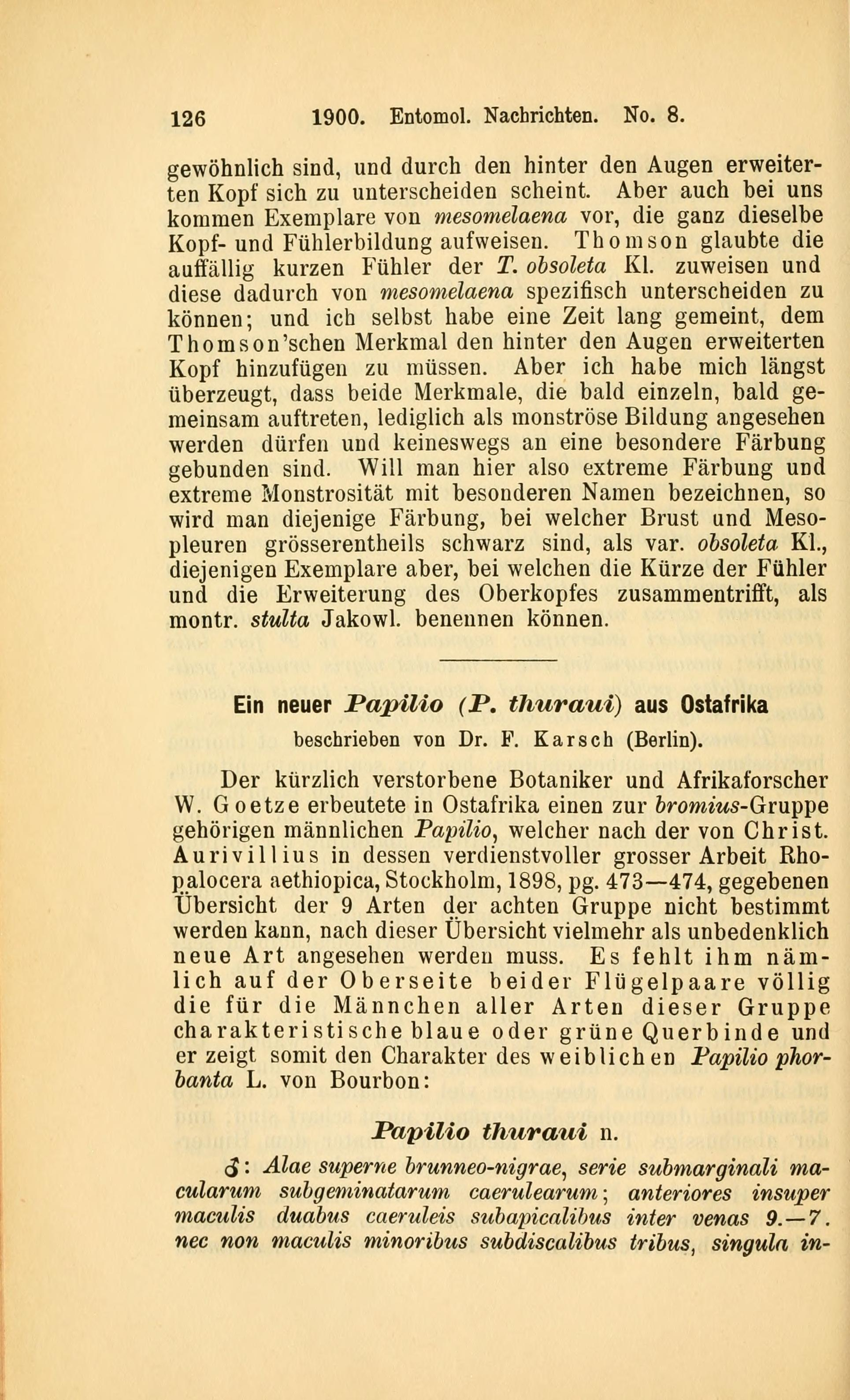
Entomologische Nachrichten

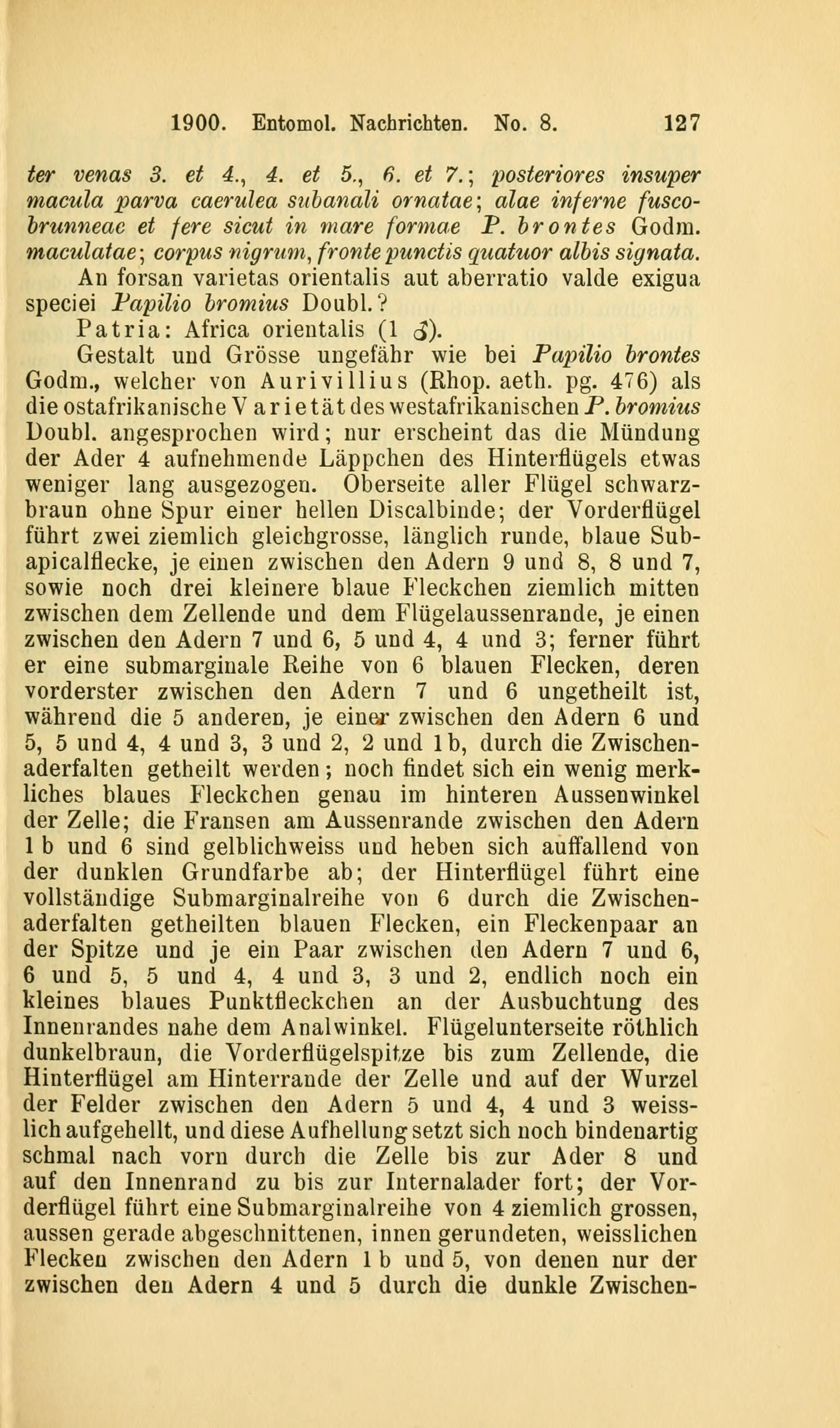

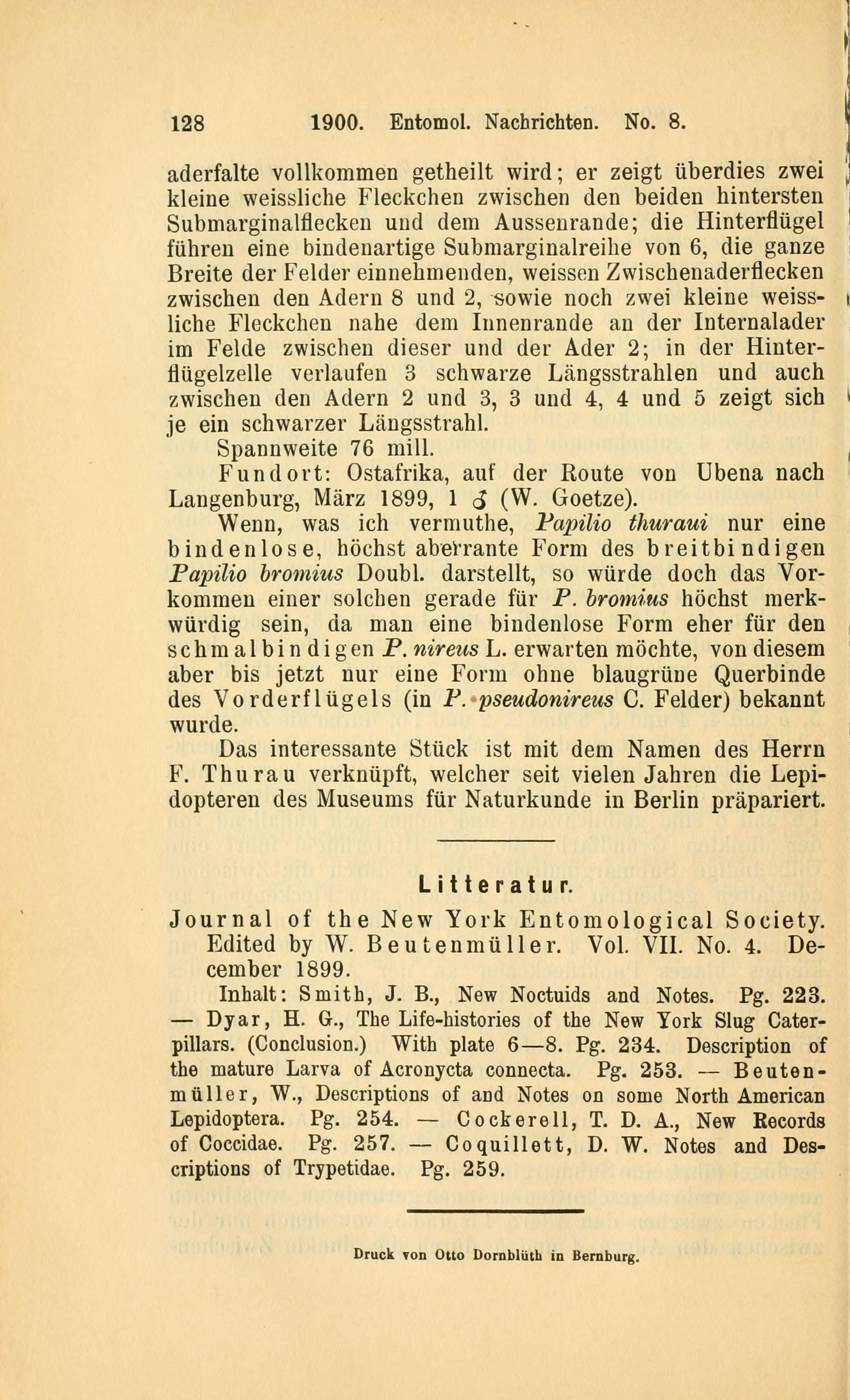

== Subspecies ==
- P. t. thuraui (southern Tanzania, northern Malawi)
- P. t. cyclopis Rothschild & Jordan, 1903 . (Malawi, Zambia)
- P. t. occidua Storace, 1951 (Republic of the Congo, Malawi, north-eastern Zambia)
- P. t. heathi (Hancock, 1984) (Malawi)
- P. t. ngorongoro (Hancock, 1984) (northern Tanzania)
- P. t. viphya (Hancock, 1984) (Malawi)

== Biology ==
The larvae feed on Toddalia asiatica.

== Taxonomy ==
Papilio thuraui belongs to a clade called the nireus species group with 15 members. The pattern is black with green or blue bands and spots. The butterflies, although called swallowtails, lack tails with the exception of Papilio charopus and Papilio hornimani. The clade members are:

- Papilio aristophontes Oberthür, 1897
- Papilio nireus Linnaeus, 1758
- Papilio charopus Westwood, 1843
- Papilio chitondensis de Sousa & Fernandes, 1966
- Papilio chrapkowskii Suffert, 1904
- Papilio chrapkowskoides Storace, 1952
- Papilio desmondi van Someren, 1939
- Papilio hornimani Distant, 1879
- Papilio interjectana Vane-Wright, 1995
- Papilio manlius Fabricius, 1798
- Papilio microps Storace, 1951
- Papilio sosia Rothschild & Jordan, 1903
- Papilio thuraui Karsch, 1900
- Papilio ufipa Carcasson, 1961
- Papilio wilsoni Rothschild, 1926

== Biogeographic realm ==
This species is located in the Afrotropical realm.

== See also ==
- Albertine Rift montane forests
- Congolian forests
