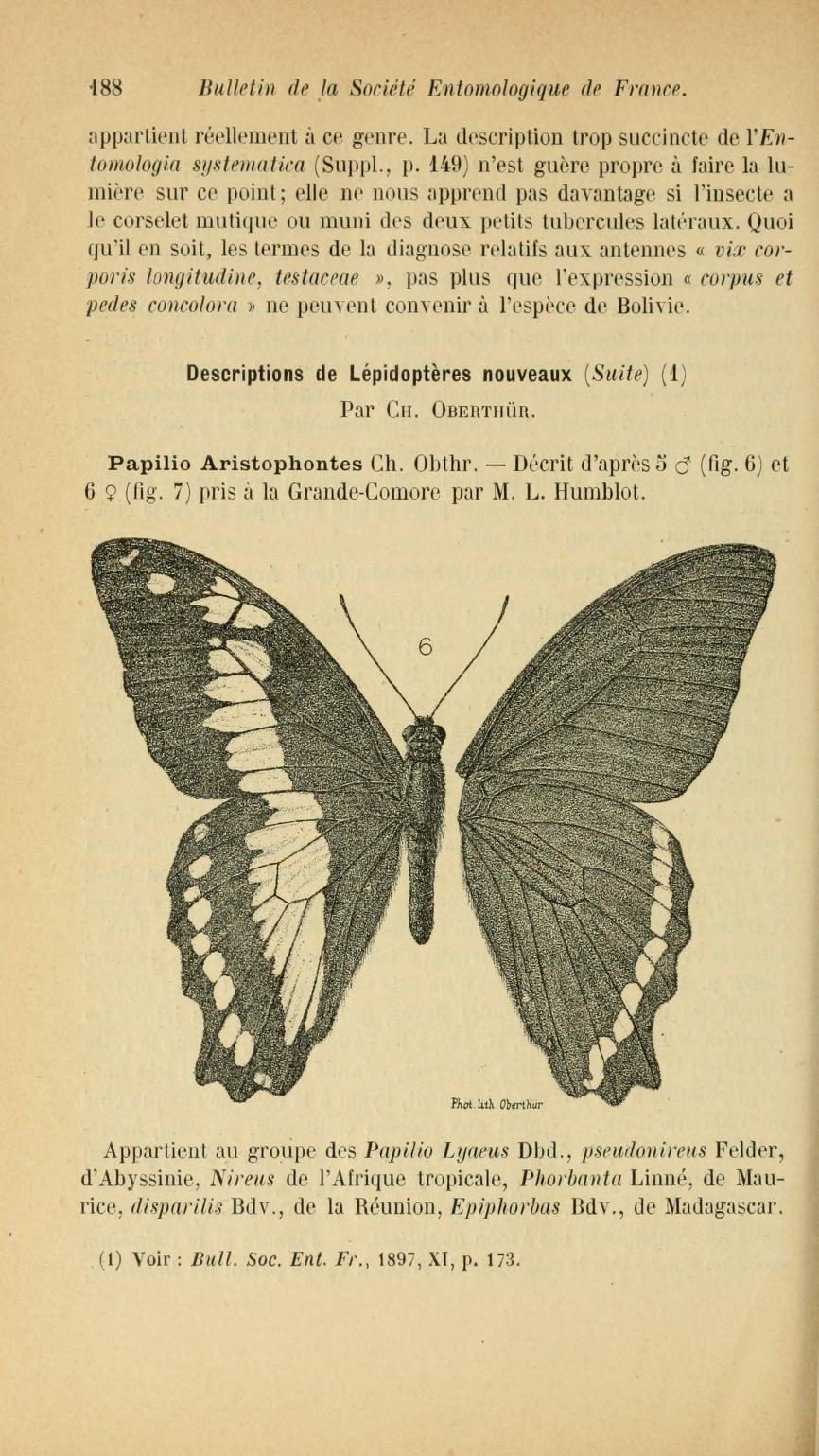

Conservation status
- Endangered (IUCN 2.3)

Scientific classification
- Kingdom: Animalia
- Phylum: Arthropoda
- Clade: Pancrustacea
- Class: Insecta
- Order: Lepidoptera
- Family: Papilionidae
- Genus: Papilio
- Species: P. aristophontes

Binomial name
- Papilio aristophontes Oberthür, 1897

= Papilio aristophontes =

Species of butterfly

Papilio aristophontes is a species of butterfly in the family Papilionidae. It is endemic to Comoros.

It is listed as a red list species due to its rarity and the threats to its survival. The eggs are laid on the plant Toddalia asiatica, but the caterpillars have been reared on other members of the Rutaceae in captivity.

== Description ==
Male: The upper forewing of the male is black with an iridescent blue bands and five blue spots. The under hindwing is black with an iridescent blue band and a row of blue submarginal spots. The hindwing has a scalloped margin and no tail. The lower forewing is entirely blackish-brown and the lower hindwing is red-brown with black veins. The lower hindwing has a narrow cream submarginal band with silver reflections.

Female: The female is olive-green and brown. The upper forewing and under hindwing are brown with a dull olive green median band and a submarginal band consisting of yellowish-olive lunules. These are continuous over both wings. The lower forewing and the lower hindwing are red-brown with a silvery submarginal band which is continuous over both wings. There is a fawn brown median band on the hindwing with pinkish-grey scales on the outside, and a white abdominal spot.

== Taxonomy ==
Papilio aristophontes belongs to an Afrotropical clade called the nireus species-group with 15 members. The pattern is black with green or blue bands and spots and the butterflies, although called swallowtails lack tails with the exception of Papilio charopus and Papilio hornimani. The clade members are:

- Papilio aristophontes Oberthür, 1897
- Papilio nireus Linnaeus, 1758
- Papilio charopus Westwood, 1843
- Papilio chitondensis de Sousa & Fernandes, 1966
- Papilio chrapkowskii Suffert, 1904
- Papilio chrapkowskoides Storace, 1952
- Papilio desmondi van Someren, 1939
- Papilio hornimani Distant, 1879
- Papilio interjectana Vane-Wright, 1995
- Papilio manlius Fabricius, 1798
- Papilio microps Storace, 1951
- Papilio sosia Rothschild & Jordan, 1903
- Papilio thuraui Karsch, 1900
- Papilio ufipa Carcasson, 1961
- Papilio wilsoni Rothschild, 1926

In some works aristophontes is ranked as a subspecies of Papilio nireus. D'Abrera, following Carcasson, recently reinstated it to full species rank.
