= Papilio wilsoni =

Scientific classification
- Kingdom: Animalia
- Phylum: Arthropoda
- Clade: Pancrustacea
- Class: Insecta
- Order: Lepidoptera
- Family: Papilionidae
- Genus: Papilio
- Species: P. wilsoni

Binomial name
- Papilio wilsoni Rothschild, 1926

Synonyms
- Papilio nireus wilsoni; Papilio (Princeps) wilsoni; Papilio (Druryia) nireus wilsoni

Species of butterfly

Papilio wilsoni is a butterfly in the family Papilionidae. It is found in Ethiopia.

== Taxonomy ==
Papilio wilsoni belongs to a clade called the nireus species-group with 15 members. The pattern is black with green bands and spots and the butterflies, although called swallowtails lack tails with the exception of Papilio charopus and Papilio hornimani. The clade members are:

- Papilio aristophontes Oberthür, 1897
- Papilio nireus Linnaeus, 1758
- Papilio charopus Westwood, 1843
- Papilio chitondensis de Sousa & Fernandes, 1966
- Papilio chrapkowskii Suffert, 1904
- Papilio chrapkowskoides Storace, 1952
- Papilio desmondi van Someren, 1939
- Papilio hornimani Distant, 1879
- Papilio interjectana Vane-Wright, 1995
- Papilio manlius Fabricius, 1798
- Papilio microps Storace, 1951
- Papilio sosia Rothschild & Jordan, 1903
- Papilio thuraui Karsch, 1900
- Papilio ufipa Carcasson, 1961
- Papilio wilsoni Rothschild, 1926
