= Papilio ufipa =

Scientific classification
- Kingdom: Animalia
- Phylum: Arthropoda
- Clade: Pancrustacea
- Class: Insecta
- Order: Lepidoptera
- Family: Papilionidae
- Genus: Papilio
- Species: P. ufipa

Binomial name
- Papilio ufipa Carcasson, 1961

Synonyms
- Papilio bromius ufipa Carcasson, 1961

Species of butterfly

Papilio ufipa is a species of swallowtail butterfly from the genus Papilio that is found in Tanzania. The habitat consists of riparian and montane forests at altitudes from 1,000 to 2,400 meters (3,300 to 7,900 ft).

== Taxonomy ==
Papilio ufipa belongs to a clade called the nireus species group with 15 members. The pattern is black with green bands and spots and the butterflies, although called swallowtails lack tails with the exception of Papilio charopus and Papilio hornimani. The clade members are:

- Papilio aristophontes Oberthür, 1897
- Papilio nireus Linnaeus, 1758
- Papilio charopus Westwood, 1843
- Papilio chitondensis de Sousa & Fernandes, 1966
- Papilio chrapkowskii Suffert, 1904
- Papilio chrapkowskoides Storace, 1952
- Papilio desmondi van Someren, 1939
- Papilio hornimani Distant, 1879
- Papilio interjectana Vane-Wright, 1995
- Papilio manlius Fabricius, 1798
- Papilio microps Storace, 1951
- Papilio sosia Rothschild & Jordan, 1903
- Papilio thuraui Karsch, 1900
- Papilio ufipa Carcasson, 1961
- Papilio wilsoni Rothschild, 1926

== Description ==
Median band narrower, straighter and bluer than in other East African races (of Papilio bromius). Submarginal spots below very large, paler mottling absent. Very similar to Papilio desmondi and can only be determined with certainty by dissection.
