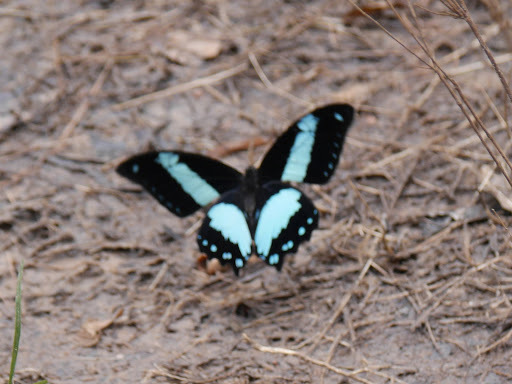
- Upperside
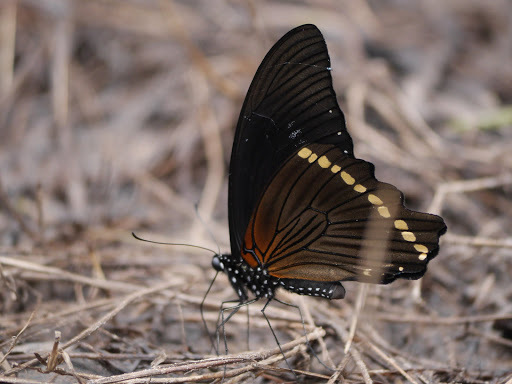
- Underside

Scientific classification
- Kingdom: Animalia
- Phylum: Arthropoda
- Clade: Pancrustacea
- Class: Insecta
- Order: Lepidoptera
- Family: Papilionidae
- Genus: Papilio
- Species: P. chrapkowskoides

Binomial name
- Papilio chrapkowskoides Storace, 1952

Synonyms
- Papilio bromius chrapkowskoides ab. opposita Storace, 1952; Doriana interjacens Storace, 1961; Papilio nurettini Koçak, 1983; Papilio bromius Doubleday, 1845; Papilio bromius ab. tessmanni Strand, 1913; Papilio bromius ab. incerta Strand, 1913; Papilio bromius bromius ab. impunctata Dufrane, 1946; Papilio bromius bromius chrapkowskii ab. ornata Dufrane, 1946; Papilio bromius bromius f. macrops Storace, 1951; Papilio bromius bromius f. latior Storace, 1951; Papilio bromius bromius f. imitans Storace, 1951; Papilio bromius bromius f. angustevittata Storace, 1951; Papilio bromius bromius f. caerulea Storace, 1951; Papilio bromius bromius var. tenuis Storace, 1951; Papilio bromius bromius var. septentrionicola Storace, 1951; Papilio bromius furvus Joicey & Talbot, 1926

= Papilio chrapkowskoides =

Broadly green-banded swallowtail

Species of butterfly

Papilio chrapkowskoides, the broadly green-banded swallowtail, is a species of swallowtail butterfly from the genus Papilio that is found in the Republic of the Congo, Uganda, Rwanda, Burundi, Tanzania, Guinea, Sierra Leone, Liberia, Ivory Coast, Ghana, Togo, Benin, Nigeria, Cameroon, Gabon, the Democratic Republic of the Congo, and Angola.

== Description ==
The blue or greenish median band of the upper surface is broad, 10–14 mm. broad at the hindmargin of the forewing, 10–17 mm. in the middle of the hindwing and distinctly widened posteriorly; the spot in cellule 2 of the hindwing always completely covers the base of the cellule and the spot in 1 c is very long and always reaches the cell. The green-blue spot in the cell of the forewing above reaches basad at least to the middle of cellule 2; forewing beneath without large yellowish submarginal spots, at the most with a few small spots near to the margin. Sierra Leone to the Congo region and Equatoria.

== Biology ==
The larvae feed on Calodendrum capense, Vepris, and Citrus species.

== Subspecies ==
- Papilio chrapkowskoides chrapkowskoides (eastern Congo Republic, south-western Uganda, Rwanda, Burundi, western Tanzania)
- Papilio chrapkowskoides nurettini Koçak, 1983 (Guinea, Sierra Leone, Liberia, Ivory Coast, Ghana, Togo, Benin, Nigeria, Cameroon, Gabon, Congo, Angola, Central African Republic, Congo Republic, western Uganda)
- Papilio chrapkowskoides nerminae Koçak, 1983 (São Tomé and Principe)

Papilio chrapkowskoides nerminae is treated as a full species by some authors.

Torben Larsen developed a species numbering system for his 2005 publication Butterflies of West Africa. The subspecies nurettini is #9. The 'Larsen' numbers have since been used with permission in A Sharp Eye on Butterflies of Ghana.

== Taxonomy ==
Papilio chrapkowskoides is a member of the Papilio genus, of which Papilio appalachiensis and Papilio xuthus are also members. Papilio chrapkowskoides belongs to a clade called the nireus species group with 15 members. The pattern is black with green or blue bands and spots and the butterflies, although called swallowtails lack tails with the exception of Papilio charopus and Papilio hornimani. The clade members are:

- Papilio aristophontes Oberthür, 1897
- Papilio nireus Linnaeus, 1758
- Papilio charopus Westwood, 1843
- Papilio chitondensis de Sousa & Fernandes, 1966
- Papilio chrapkowskii Suffert, 1904
- Papilio chrapkowskoides Storace, 1952
- Papilio desmondi van Someren, 1939
- Papilio hornimani Distant, 1879
- Papilio interjectana Vane-Wright, 1995
- Papilio manlius Fabricius, 1798
- Papilio microps Storace, 1951
- Papilio sosia Rothschild & Jordan, 1903
- Papilio thuraui Karsch, 1900
- Papilio ufipa Carcasson, 1961
- Papilio wilsoni Rothschild, 1926

== Description ==
Reflecting the confused separation between Papilio bromius and P. chrapkowskii. Very similar to P. chrapkowskii, but pale mottling and submarginal spots below not so well developed. Cilia of forewing black, not white, as in P. chrapkowskii. A somewhat unstable race with frequent transitions to the two previous races: P. bromius and P. chrapkowskii.
