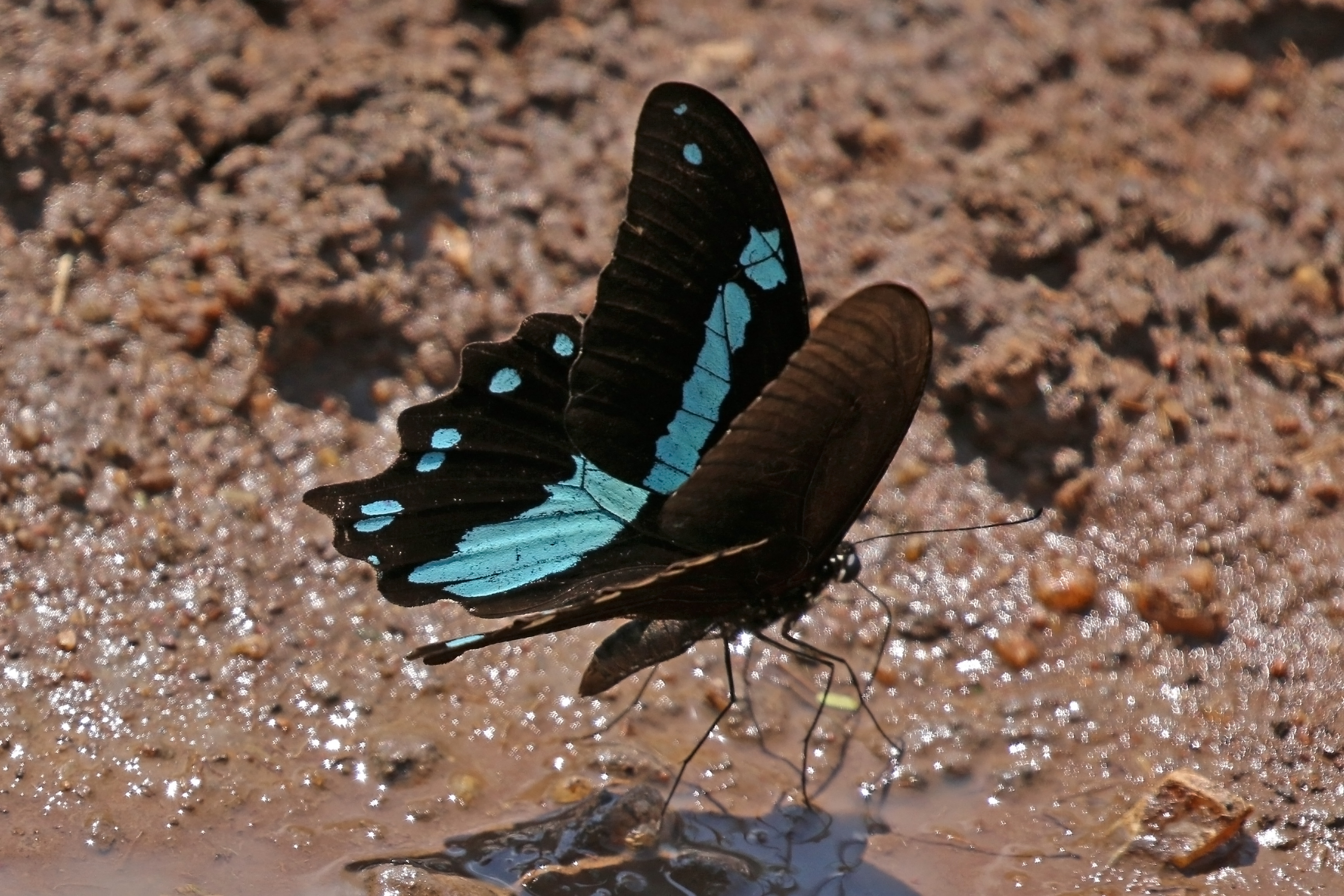

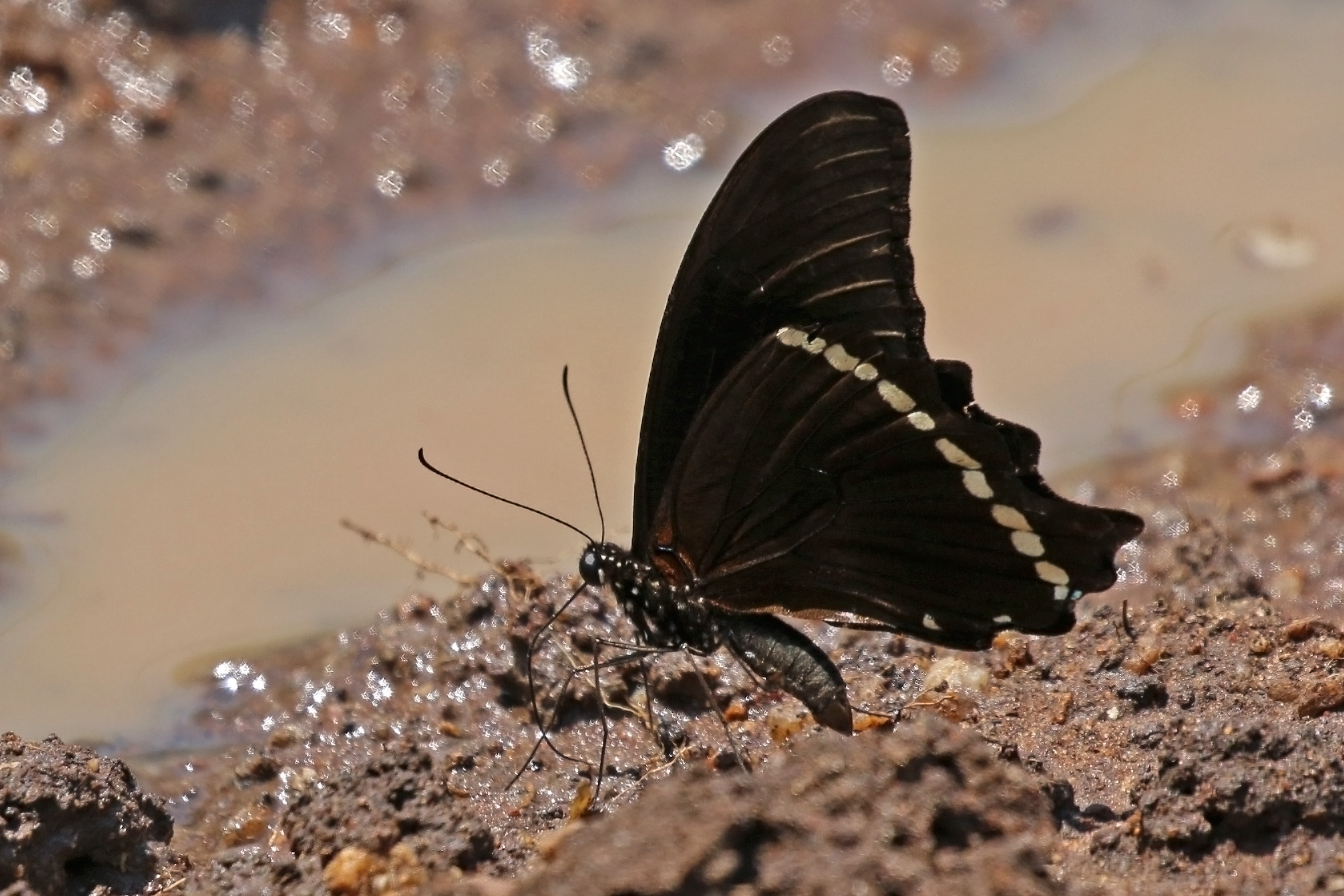
- both P. n. lyaeus Semliki Wildlife Reserve' Uganda

Scientific classification
- Kingdom: Animalia
- Phylum: Arthropoda
- Clade: Pancrustacea
- Class: Insecta
- Order: Lepidoptera
- Family: Papilionidae
- Genus: Papilio
- Species: P. nireus

Binomial name
- Papilio nireus Linnaeus, 1758

Synonyms
- Papilio erinus Gray, [1853]; Papilio nireus f. nora Strand, 1915; Papilio nireus f. dimidiatus Le Cerf, 1924; Papilio nireoides Braun, 1932; Papilio nireus nireus ab. bedoci Dufrane, 1946; Papilio nireus nireus ab. punctata Dufrane, 1946; Papilio nireus nireus ab. seeldrayersi Dufrane, 1946; Papilio nireus nireus ab. pierardi Dufrane, 1946; Papilio nireus nireus ab. falcata Dufrane, 1946; Papilio nireus nireus f. houzeaui Dufrane, 1946; Papilio nireus nireus f. tenuivittata Dufrane, 1946; Papilio nireus nireus var. xerophila Storace, 1952; Papilio nireus micronireus Storace, 1952; Papilio nireus ab. lyaeoides Storace, 1952; Papilio nireus nireus f. cedeae Sala, 1992; Papilio lyaeus Doubleday, 1845; Papilio lyaeus aelyus Suffert, 1904; Papilio mantitheus Ehrmann, 1920; Papilio nireus-lyaeus f. callistria Le Cerf, 1927; Papilio nireus pseudonireus f. pseudonireoides Storace, 1952; Papilio donaldsoni Sharpe, 1896; Papilio nireus var. abyssinica Cannaviello, 1900; Papilio nireus pseudonireus ab. pseudolyaeus Storace, 1952; Papilio nireus pseudonireus ab. anticemaculata Storace, 1952; Papilio nireus pseudonireus ab. minor Storace, 1952; Papilio nireus pseudonireus f. semivittata Storace, 1952

= Papilio nireus =

Green-banded swallowtail

Species of butterfly

Papilio nireus, the green-banded swallowtail, narrow-banded blue swallowtail, or African blue-banded swallowtail, is a butterfly of the family Papilionidae. It is found in Sub-Saharan Africa.

== Description ==
The wingspan is 75–90 millimetres (3.0–3.5 in) in males and 85–95 mm (3.3–3.7 in) in females. Forewing above at most with two blue submarginal spots in cellules 7 and 8; rarely in the female with several yellow ones; the blue (male) or greenish (female) median band is 2–7 mm broad at the hindmargin of the forewing and 4–12 mm in the middle of the hindwing, and is only a little widened posteriorly; the spot in cellule 2 of the hindwing does not completely cover the base of the cellule and the narrow spot in cellule lc does not reach the cell; forewing beneath almost always entirely without submarginal spots. [Nominate] Median band of the forewing above well developed, the spots of cellules 2—4 obliquely cut off distally; the discal spot in cellule 2 of the hindwing is very long and produced farther towards the anal angle than the spot in cellule 1 c. Sierra Leone to Angola and Uganda. — lyaeus Dbl. The median band narrower, but complete; the spot in cellule 2 of the hindwing is shorter and does not reach so far towards the anal angle as the one in 1 c. Larva above green, beneath whitish, with a whitish oblique longitudinal streak at each side on segments 7 and 8 and a girdle of ring-shaped spots on the third segment. Cape Colony to Angola and British East Africa. male ab. aelyus Suff. only differs from lyaeus in the discal spot in cellule 1 a of the forewing being entirely wanting and the one in cellule 1 b divided into two; German East Africa.— pseudonireus Fldr. (= donaldsoni Em. Sharpe). The median band is altogether absent on the forewing or is only represented by a few very small spots; on the hindwing it is formed as in lyaeus. Somali¬ land and Abyssinia.

== Biology ==
It flies year-round, with peaks from November to February.

The larvae feed on Calodendrum capense, Vepris species, and Citrus species.

== Subspecies ==
Listed alphabetically:

- P. n. lyaeus Doubleday, 1845 – narrowly green-banded swallowtail (Sudan, Uganda, Kenya, Tanzania, Malawi, Zambia, Mozambique, Zimbabwe, Botswana, Namibia, South Africa, Swaziland)
- P. n. nireus Linnaeus, 1758 – (Senegal, Gambia, Guinea-Bissau, Guinea, Burkina Faso, Sierra Leone, Liberia, Ivory Coast, Ghana, Togo, Benin, southern Nigeria, Cameroon, Equatorial Guinea, Gabon, Congo, Angola, Central African Republic, Democratic Republic of the Congo, Uganda, western Tanzania, Zambia)
- P. n. pseudonireus C. & R. Felder, 1865 – (northern Kenya, northern Uganda, southern Sudan, Somalia, Ethiopia, Eritrea)

Torben Larsen developed a species numbering system for his 2005 publication Butterflies of West Africa. The nominate subspecies is #11. The 'Larsen' numbers have since been used with permission in A Sharp Eye on Butterflies of Ghana.

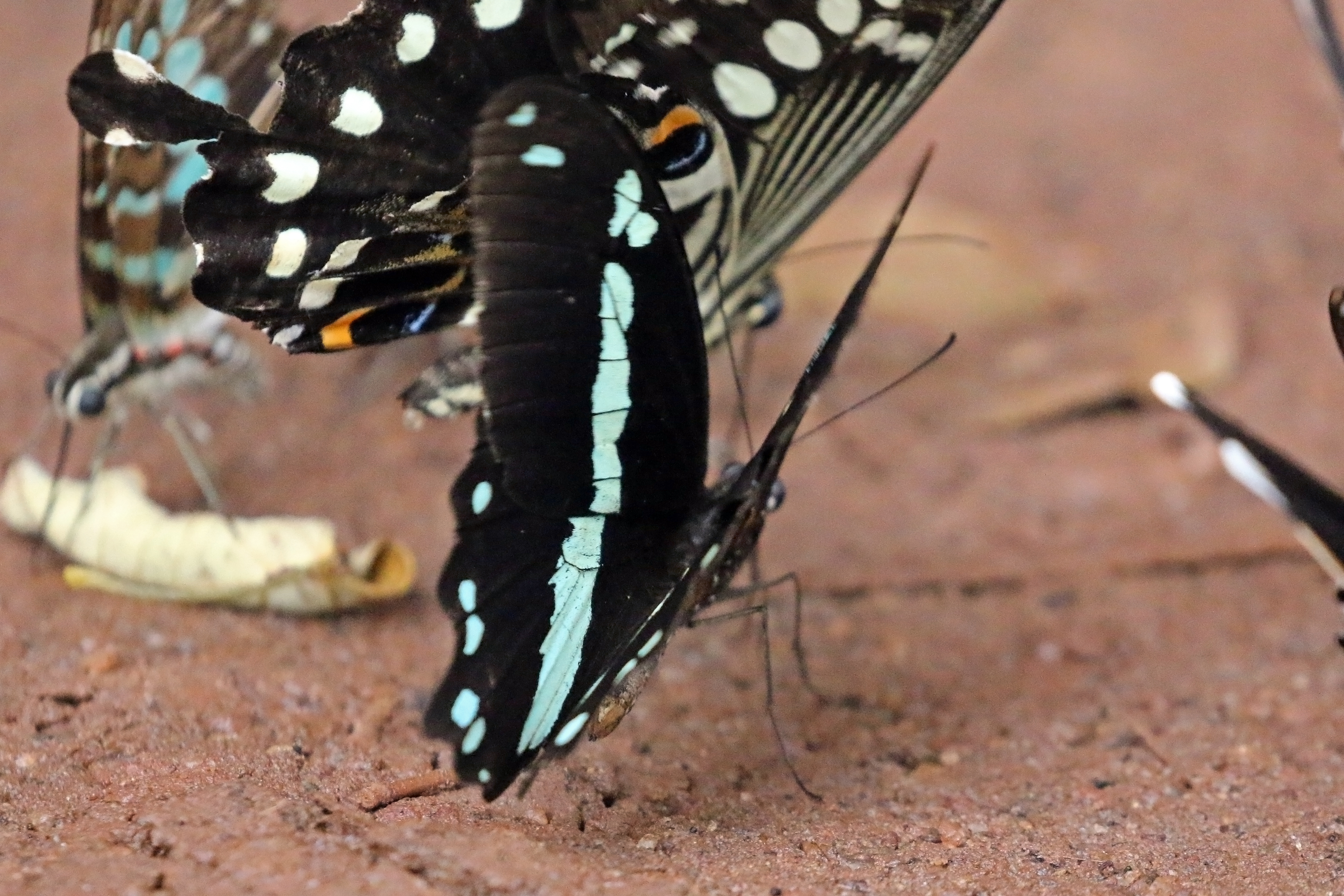
P. n. nireus dorsal side
Bobiri Forest, Ghana

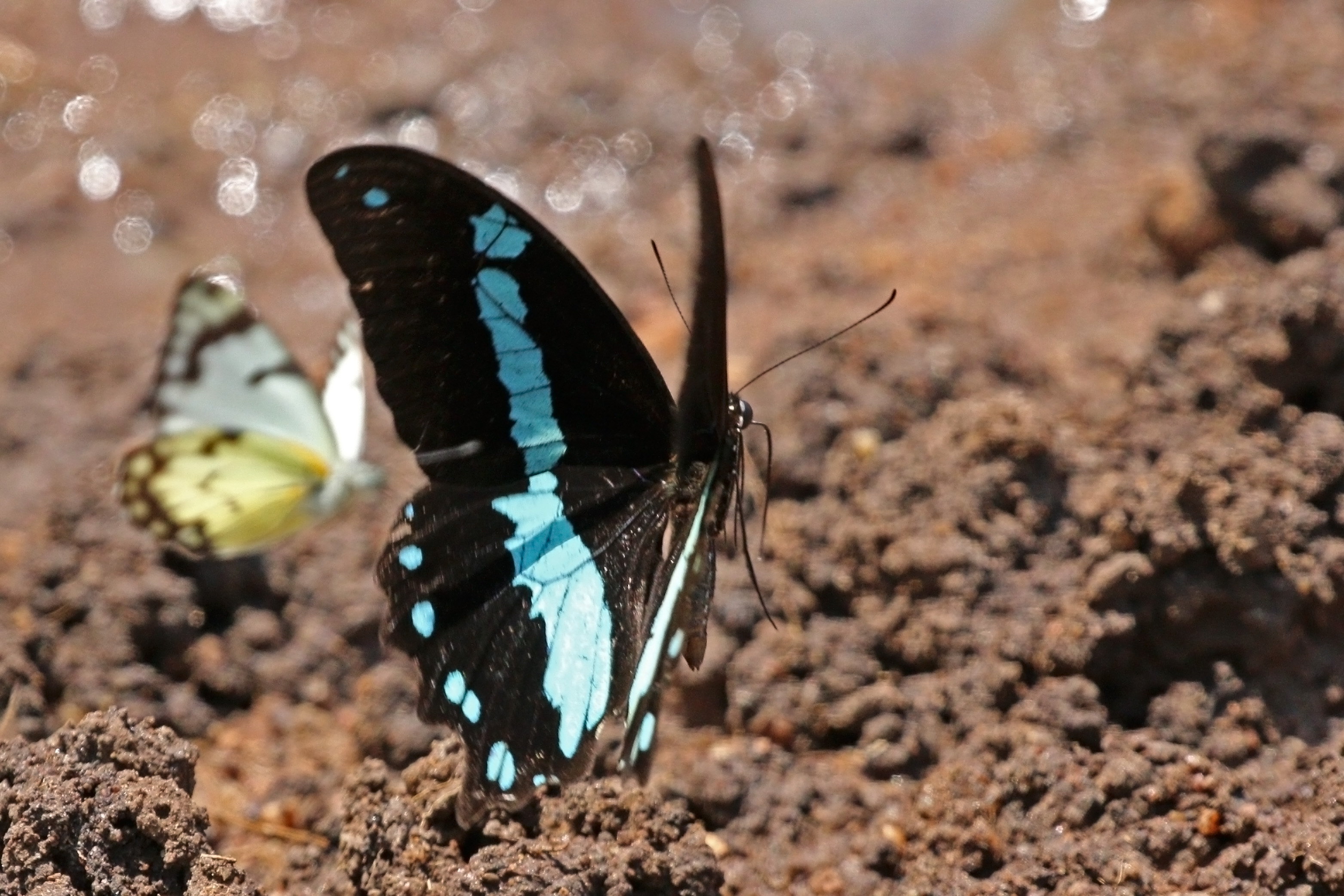
P. n. lyaeus in flight, Semliki Wildlife Reserve, Uganda

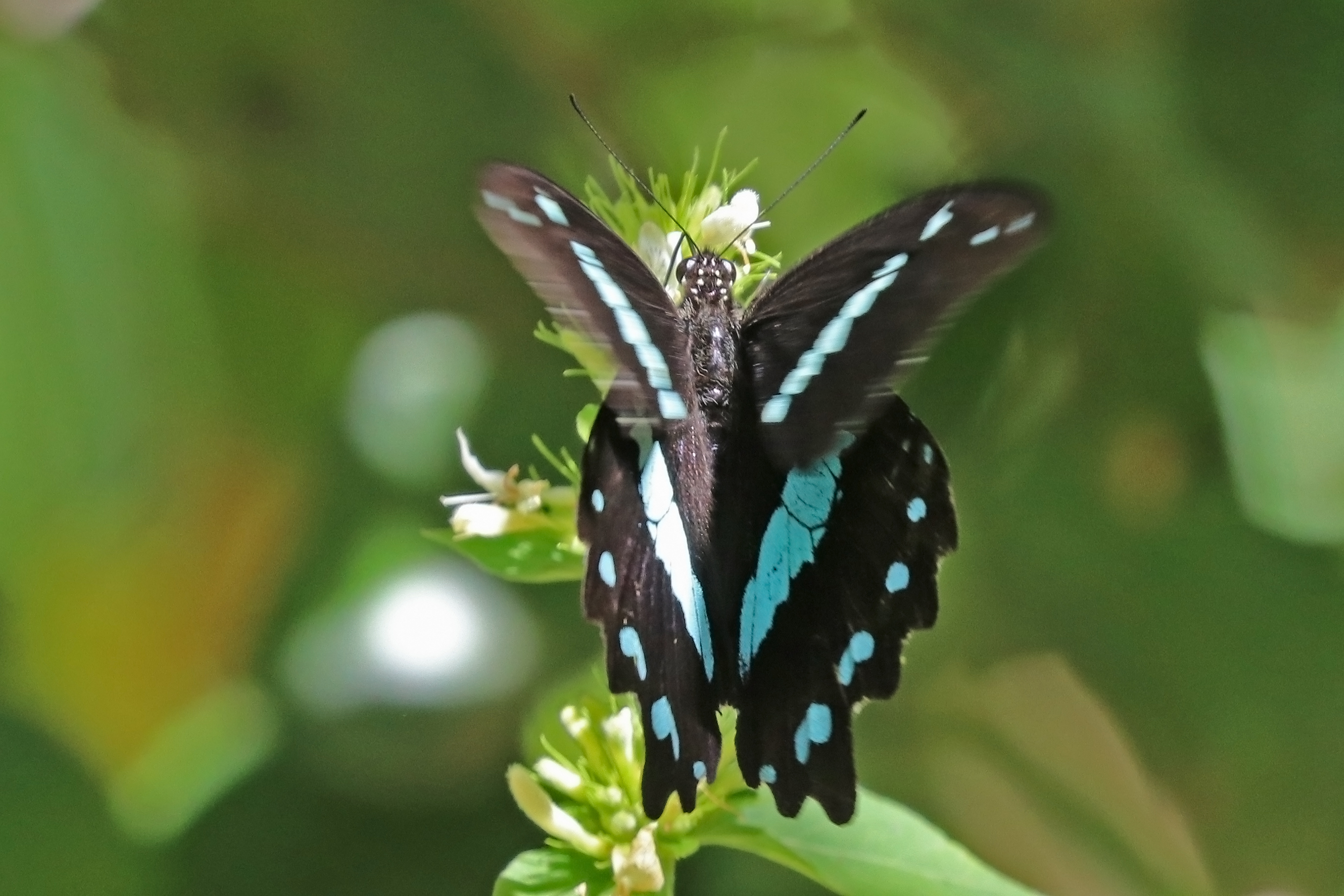
P. n. pseudonireus, Harenna Forest, Ethiopia

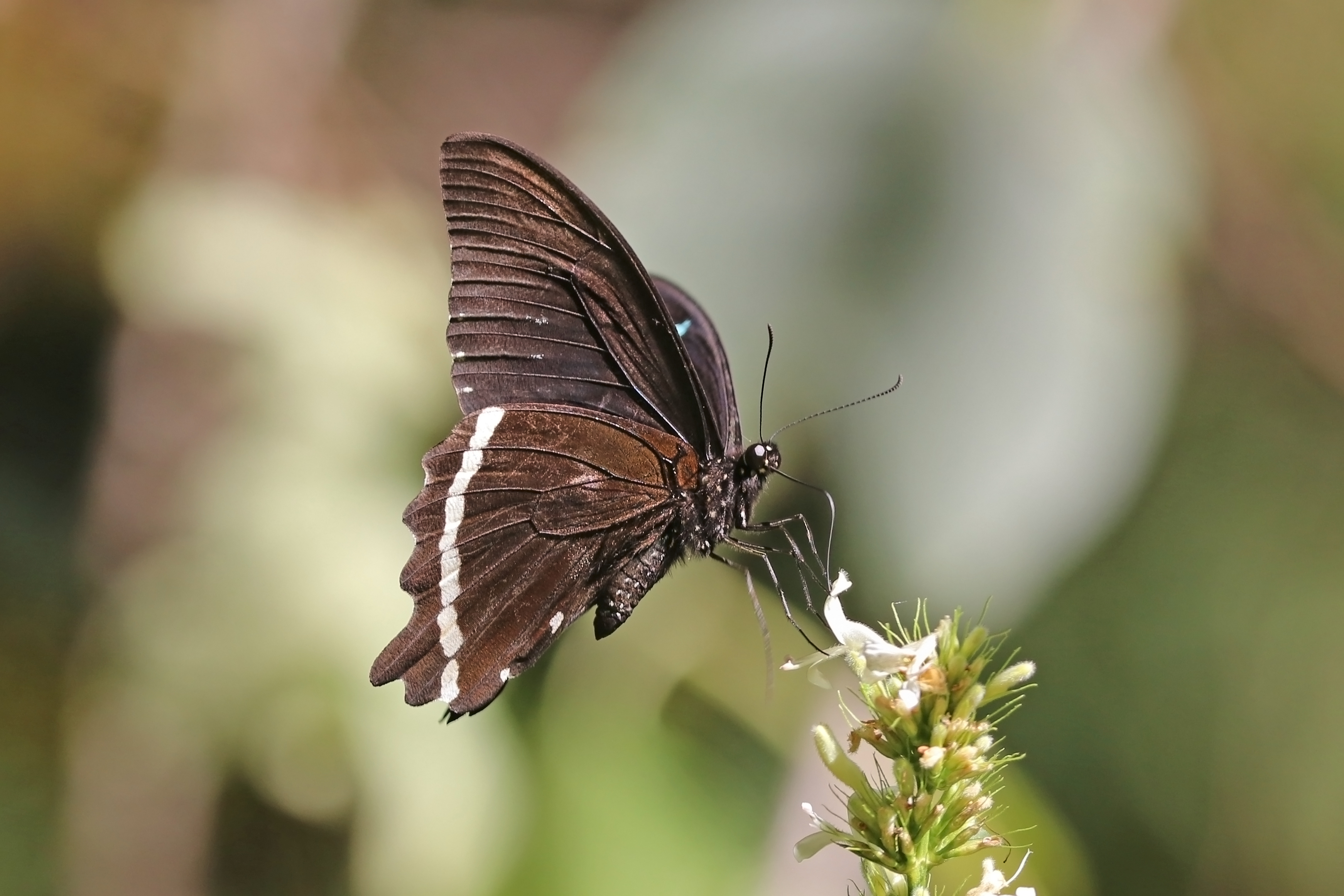
P. n. pseudonireus, Harenna Forest, Ethiopia

== Taxonomy ==
Papilio nireus belongs to a clade called the nireus species group with 15 members. The pattern is black with green bands and spots and the butterflies, although called swallowtails, lack tails with the exception of Papilio charopus and Papilio hornimani. The clade members are:

- Papilio aristophontes Oberthür, 1897
- Papilio nireus Linnaeus, 1758
- Papilio charopus Westwood, 1843
- Papilio chitondensis de Sousa & Fernandes, 1966
- Papilio chrapkowskii Suffert, 1904
- Papilio chrapkowskoides Storace, 1952
- Papilio desmondi van Someren, 1939
- Papilio hornimani Distant, 1879
- Papilio interjectana Vane-Wright, 1995
- Papilio manlius Fabricius, 1798
- Papilio microps Storace, 1951
- Papilio sosia Rothschild & Jordan, 1903
- Papilio thuraui Karsch, 1900
- Papilio ufipa Carcasson, 1961
- Papilio wilsoni Rothschild, 1926
