= Papilio microps =

Scientific classification
- Kingdom: Animalia
- Phylum: Arthropoda
- Clade: Pancrustacea
- Class: Insecta
- Order: Lepidoptera
- Family: Papilionidae
- Genus: Papilio
- Species: P. microps

Binomial name
- Papilio microps Storace, 1951

Synonyms
- Papilio aethiops microps Storace, 1951; Papilio aethiops Rothschild & Jordan, 1905; Papilio aethiops ab. elicola Strand, 1911; Papilio aethieps f. oribazoides Carpenter, 1935; Papilio aethiops ab. ragazzii Storace, 1952; Papilio aethiopsis Hancock, 1983; Papilio yildizae Koçak, 1983

Species of butterfly

Papilio microps is a species of swallowtail butterfly from the genus Papilio that is found in Ethiopia and Somalia.

== Taxonomy ==
Papilio microps belongs to an Afrotropical clade called the nireus species group with 15 members. The pattern is black with green bands and spots and the butterflies, although called swallowtails lack tails with the exception of Papilio charopus and Papilio hornimani. The clade members are:

- Papilio aristophontes Oberthür, 1897
- Papilio nireus Linnaeus, 1758
- Papilio charopus Westwood, 1843
- Papilio chitondensis de Sousa & Fernandes, 1966
- Papilio chrapkowskii Suffert, 1904
- Papilio chrapkowskoides Storace, 1952
- Papilio desmondi van Someren, 1939
- Papilio hornimani Distant, 1879
- Papilio interjectana Vane-Wright, 1995
- Papilio manlius Fabricius, 1798
- Papilio microps Storace, 1951
- Papilio sosia Rothschild & Jordan, 1903
- Papilio thuraui Karsch, 1900
- Papilio ufipa Carcasson, 1961
- Papilio wilsoni Rothschild, 1926
