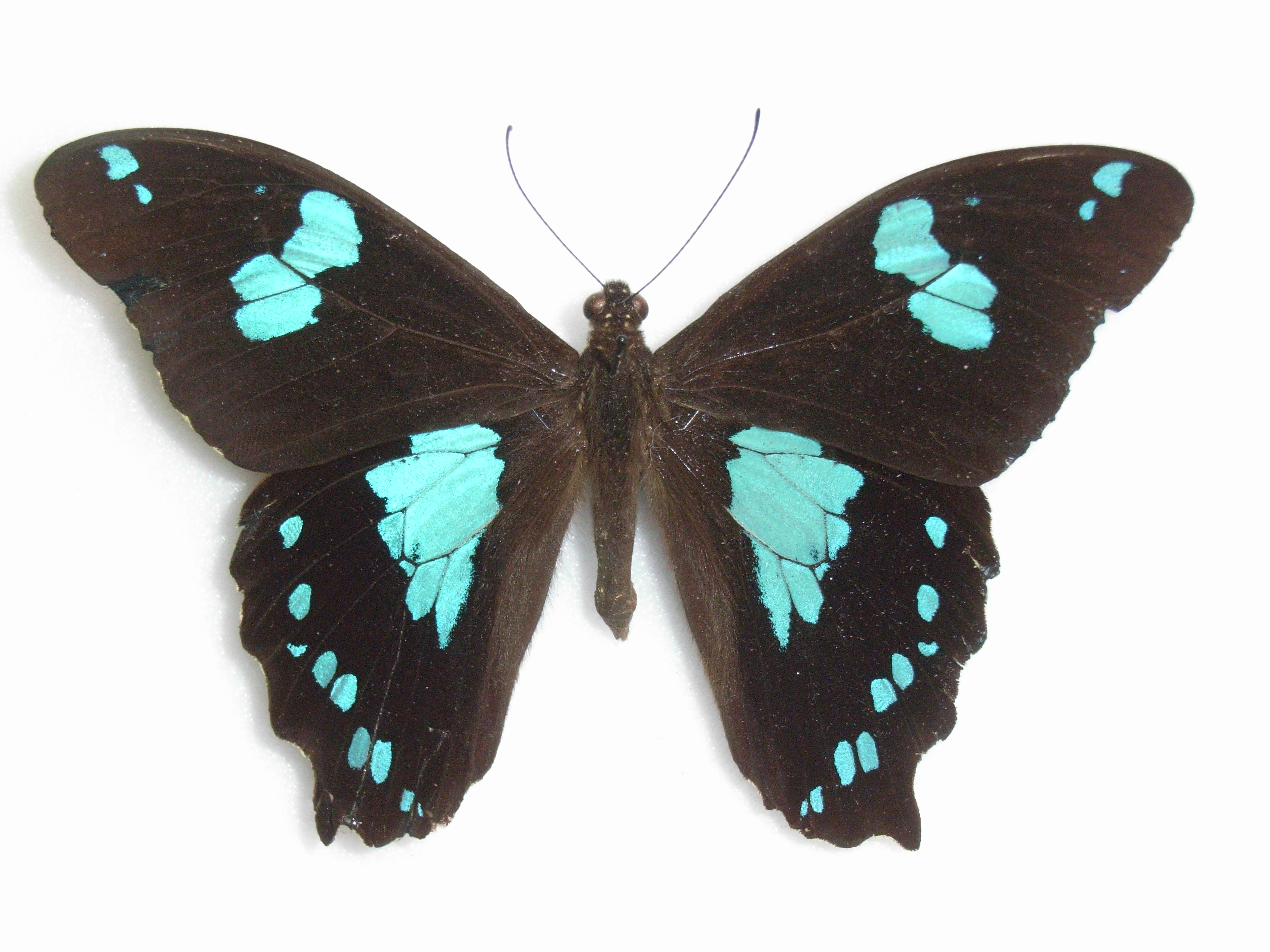

Conservation status
- Near Threatened (IUCN 2.3)

Scientific classification
- Kingdom: Animalia
- Phylum: Arthropoda
- Clade: Pancrustacea
- Class: Insecta
- Order: Lepidoptera
- Family: Papilionidae
- Genus: Papilio
- Species: P. manlius

Binomial name
- Papilio manlius Fabricius, 1798

Synonyms
- Papilio grachus Fabricius, 1798; Papilio philemon Fabricius, 1938

= Papilio manlius =

Species of butterfly

Papilio manlius is a species of butterfly in the family Papilionidae. It is endemic to Mauritius.

== Description ==
The discal band of the forewing in both sexes only composed of three spots (in cellules 3, 4 and in the cell); that of the hindwing short, only covering the base of cellules 2 and 3 and there obliquely cut off; both wings above with blue submarginal spots; the forewing of the has, however, only very few of these. Mauritius.

== Taxonomy ==
Papilio manlius belongs to an Afrotropical clade called the nireus species group with 15 members. The pattern is black with green bands and spots and the butterflies, although called swallowtails lack tails with the exception of Papilio charopus and Papilio hornimani. The clade members are:

- Papilio aristophontes Oberthür, 1897
- Papilio nireus Linnaeus, 1758
- Papilio charopus Westwood, 1843
- Papilio chitondensis de Sousa & Fernandes, 1966
- Papilio chrapkowskii Suffert, 1904
- Papilio chrapkowskoides Storace, 1952
- Papilio desmondi van Someren, 1939
- Papilio hornimani Distant, 1879
- Papilio interjectana Vane-Wright, 1995
- Papilio manlius Fabricius, 1798
- Papilio microps Storace, 1951
- Papilio sosia Rothschild & Jordan, 1903
- Papilio thuraui Karsch, 1900
- Papilio ufipa Carcasson, 1961
- Papilio wilsoni Rothschild, 1926

== Sources ==
- Gimenez Dixon, M. (1996). "Papilio manlius". IUCN Red List of Threatened Species. 1996 e.T15997A5346633. doi:10.2305/IUCN.UK.1996.RLTS.T15997A5346633.en.
