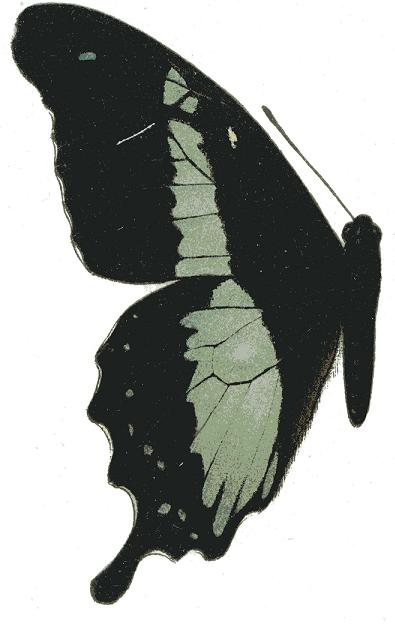

Scientific classification
- Kingdom: Animalia
- Phylum: Arthropoda
- Clade: Pancrustacea
- Class: Insecta
- Order: Lepidoptera
- Family: Papilionidae
- Genus: Papilio
- Species: P. charopus

Binomial name
- Papilio charopus Westwood, 1843

Synonyms
- Papilio charopus montuosus Joicey & Talbot, 1927

= Papilio charopus =

Tailed green-banded swallowtail

Species of butterfly

Papilio charopus, the tailed green-banded swallowtail, is a species of swallowtail butterfly from the genus Papilio that is found in Nigeria, Cameroon, Equatorial Guinea, Republic of the Congo, Uganda, Rwanda, and Burundi.

== Subspecies ==
- Papilio charopus charopus (Nigeria, Cameroon, Equatorial Guinea: Bioko)
- Papilio charopus juventus Le Cerf, 1924 (TL: Congo Republic [Semliki Valley]; Congo Republic (Ituri, Kivu), western Uganda, Rwanda, Burundi) [syn. = P. c. montuosus (Joicey & Talbot, 1927; Encycl. Ent. (B3) 2 (1): 2; (TL: Congo Republic [N.W. Kivu, Upper Iowa Valley, near msisisi, 5000–6000 ft]), junior synonym]

== Habitat ==
Highland forests (Congolian forests, Lower Guinean forests).

== Status ==
Fairly common and not threatened.

== Description ==
External images The ground colour is black. The markings are metallic blue. The blue band reaches the hind wing margin in area lb.Seitz- Apex of the forewing produced and the distal margin therefore distinctly excised at the end of veins 5 and 6; forewing beneath with four large yellowish submarginal spots in cellules 1 b—4; the blue median band of the upper surface gradually and very considerably widened posteriorly, so that the spots of cellules 2 and 8 of the hindwing are very long and cover much more than half their cellules; the submarginal spots of the hindwing beneath of the ground-colour and consequently only indicated by their silver rings. — Ashanti to the Cameroons.

== Taxonomy ==
Papilio charopus belongs to a clade called the nireus species group with 15 members. The pattern is black with green or blue bands and spots and the butterflies, although called swallowtails, lack tails with the exception of this species and Papilio hornimani. The clade members are:

- Papilio aristophontes Oberthür, 1897
- Papilio nireus Linnaeus, 1758
- Papilio charopus Westwood, 1843
- Papilio chitondensis de Sousa & Fernandes, 1966
- Papilio chrapkowskii Suffert, 1904
- Papilio chrapkowskoides Storace, 1952
- Papilio desmondi van Someren, 1939
- Papilio hornimani Distant, 1879
- Papilio interjectana Vane-Wright, 1995
- Papilio manlius Fabricius, 1798
- Papilio microps Storace, 1951
- Papilio sosia Rothschild & Jordan, 1903
- Papilio thuraui Karsch, 1900
- Papilio ufipa Carcasson, 1961
- Papilio wilsoni Rothschild, 1926
