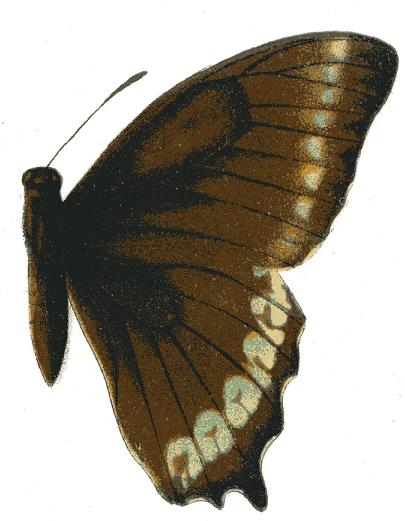
- female

Conservation status
- Vulnerable (IUCN 2.3)

Scientific classification
- Kingdom: Animalia
- Phylum: Arthropoda
- Clade: Pancrustacea
- Class: Insecta
- Order: Lepidoptera
- Family: Papilionidae
- Genus: Papilio
- Species: P. phorbanta

Binomial name
- Papilio phorbanta Linnaeus, 1771

Synonyms
- Papilio disparilis Boisduval, 1833; Papilio disparilis var. nana Oberthür, 1879

= Papilio phorbanta =

Papillon la pature

Species of butterfly

Papilio phorbanta, also known as the small Réunion swallowtail (or papillon la pâture in French), is a species of butterfly in the family Papilionidae. It is thought to be endemic to Réunion but may also be present on the Seychelles, but it might be extinct there.

The inside of the male's wings is black with large blue spots, while the female is brown with white spots on the edge.

Larvae feed on Toddalia asiatica but are sometimes also found on Citrus leaves. They can be found at altitudes between 300 and 1200 m though adults also fly between sea level and 1400 m. Parasites: on eggs: Trichogrammatidae or Scelionidae, on larvae: Carcelia evoluans.

Papilio phorbanta is protected by ministerial ordinance that prohibits capture, sale and transport since 1993.

== Subspecies ==
- Papilio phorbanta phorbanta (Reunion)
- Papilio phorbanta nana Oberthür, 1879 (Seychelles)
