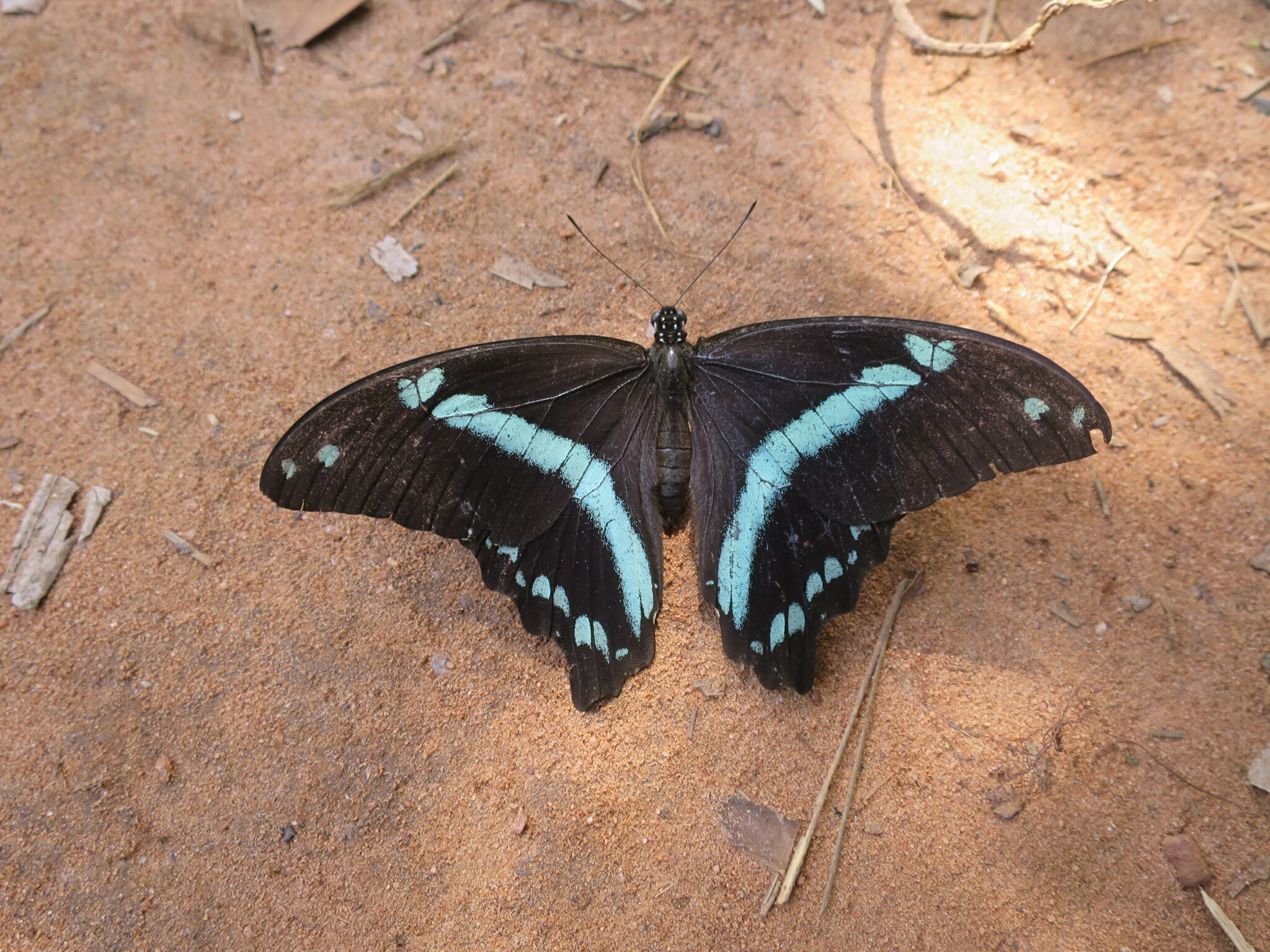
- Upperside
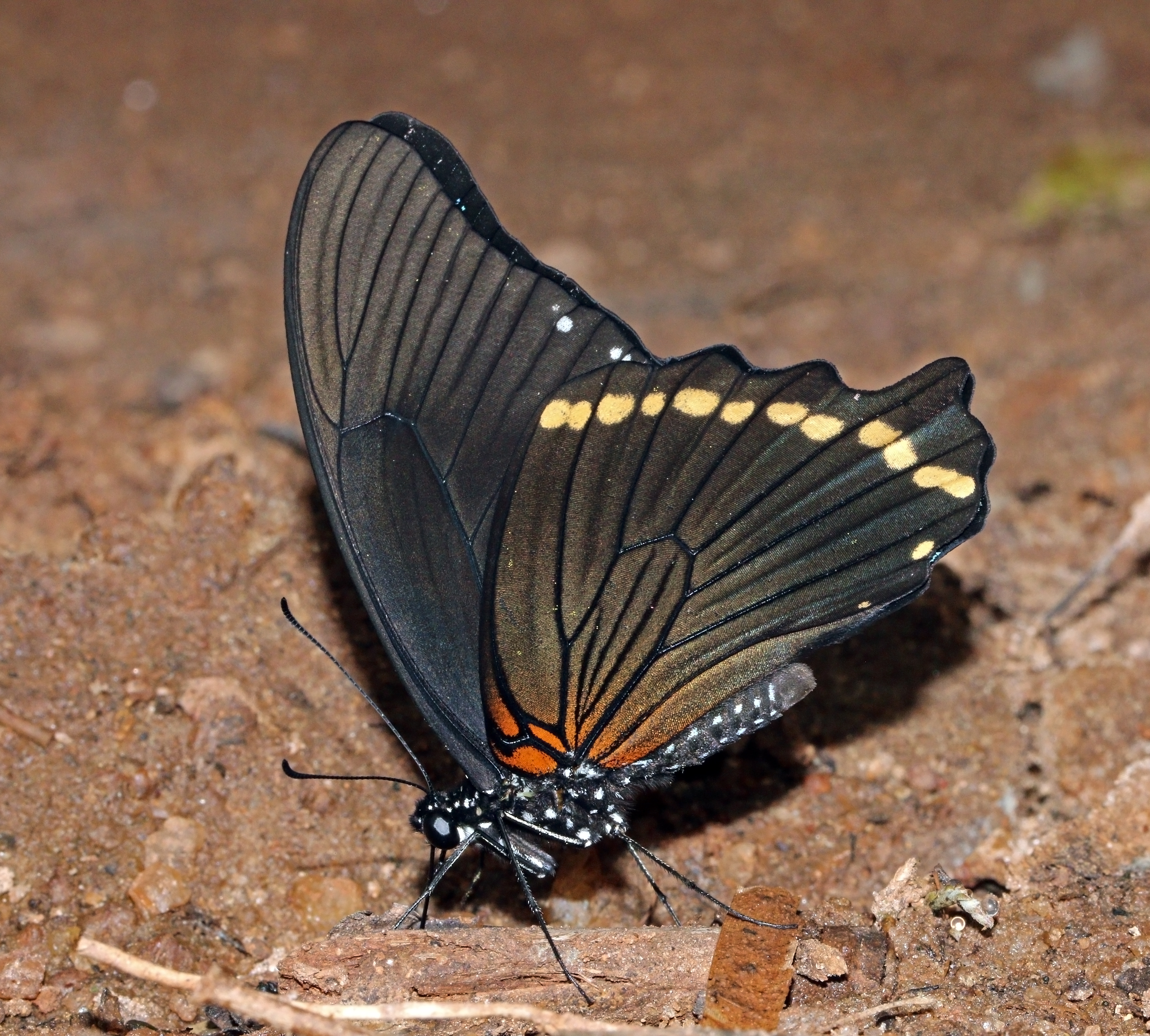
- Underside

Scientific classification
- Kingdom: Animalia
- Phylum: Arthropoda
- Clade: Pancrustacea
- Class: Insecta
- Order: Lepidoptera
- Family: Papilionidae
- Genus: Papilio
- Species: P. sosia

Binomial name
- Papilio sosia Rothschild and Jordan, 1903

Synonyms
- Papilio sosia f. imitatrix Storace, 1951; Papilio sosia ab. pristina Storace, 1951; Papilio sosia ab. atlantica Birket-Smith, 1960

= Papilio sosia =

Species of butterfly

Papilio sosia, the medium green-banded swallowtail, is a butterfly of the family Papilionidae. It is found in the Afrotropical realm. The species was first described by Walter Rothschild in 1903.

== Description ==
Forewing above in cellules 1 b—8 with distinct, small, usually double submarginal dots, but beneath without large submarginal spots; the median band formed almost as in nireus, though the spot in cellule 2 covers the base of the cellule, but is more produced anally than the spot in 1 c, which does not reach the cell. — Sierra Leone to the Congo region and Uganda. The median band is straight and regular and never less than 1 cm in cell lb of the forewing, nearly always much wider.

== Biology ==
The larva feeds on Zanthoxylum and Citrus.

== Subspecies ==
Subspecies include:

- P. s. sosia (Guinea, Sierra Leone, Liberia, Ivory Coast, Ghana, Togo, Benin, southern Nigeria, western Cameroon)
- P. s. pulchra Berger, 1950(Cameroon, Gabon, Congo, Central African Republic, northern Angola, Congo Republic)
- P. s. debilis Storace, 1951 (Uganda, northwestern Tanzania)

Torben Larsen developed a species numbering system for his 2005 publication Butterflies of West Africa. The nominate subspecies is #10. The 'Larsen' numbers have since been used with permission in A Sharp Eye on Butterflies of Ghana.

== Taxonomy ==
Papilio sosia belongs to a clade called the nireus species group with 15 members. The pattern is black with green or blue bands and spots and the butterflies, although called swallowtails, they lack tails with the exception of Papilio charopus and Papilio hornimani. The clade members are:

- Papilio aristophontes Oberthür, 1897
- Papilio nireus Linnaeus, 1758
- Papilio charopus Westwood, 1843
- Papilio chitondensis de Sousa & Fernandes, 1966
- Papilio chrapkowskii Suffert, 1904
- Papilio chrapkowskoides Storace, 1952
- Papilio desmondi van Someren, 1939
- Papilio hornimani Distant, 1879
- Papilio interjectana Vane-Wright, 1995
- Papilio manlius Fabricius, 1798
- Papilio microps Storace, 1951
- Papilio sosia Rothschild & Jordan, 1903
- Papilio thuraui Karsch, 1900
- Papilio ufipa Carcasson, 1961
- Papilio wilsoni Rothschild, 1926

== See also ==
- Congolian forests
- Guinean Forests of West Africa

== Sources ==
- Carcasson, R.H. (1960). "The Swallowtail Butterflies of East Africa (Lepidoptera, Papilionidae)". Journal of the East Africa Natural History Society pdf Key to East Africa members of the species group, diagnostic and other notes and figures. (Permission to host granted by The East Africa Natural History Society)
- Collins, N. Mark; Morris, Michael G. (1985). Threatened Swallowtail Butterflies of the World: The IUCN Red Data Book. Gland & Cambridge: IUCN. ISBN 978-2-88032-603-6 – via Biodiversity Heritage Library.
- Larsen, T.B. (2005). Butterflies of West Africa Apollo Books ISBN 87-88757-43-9
- Storace, L. (1951-1952). Recherches sur le groupe africain de Papilio nireus L. Lambillionea 51:44-52; 54-57; 73-76.
