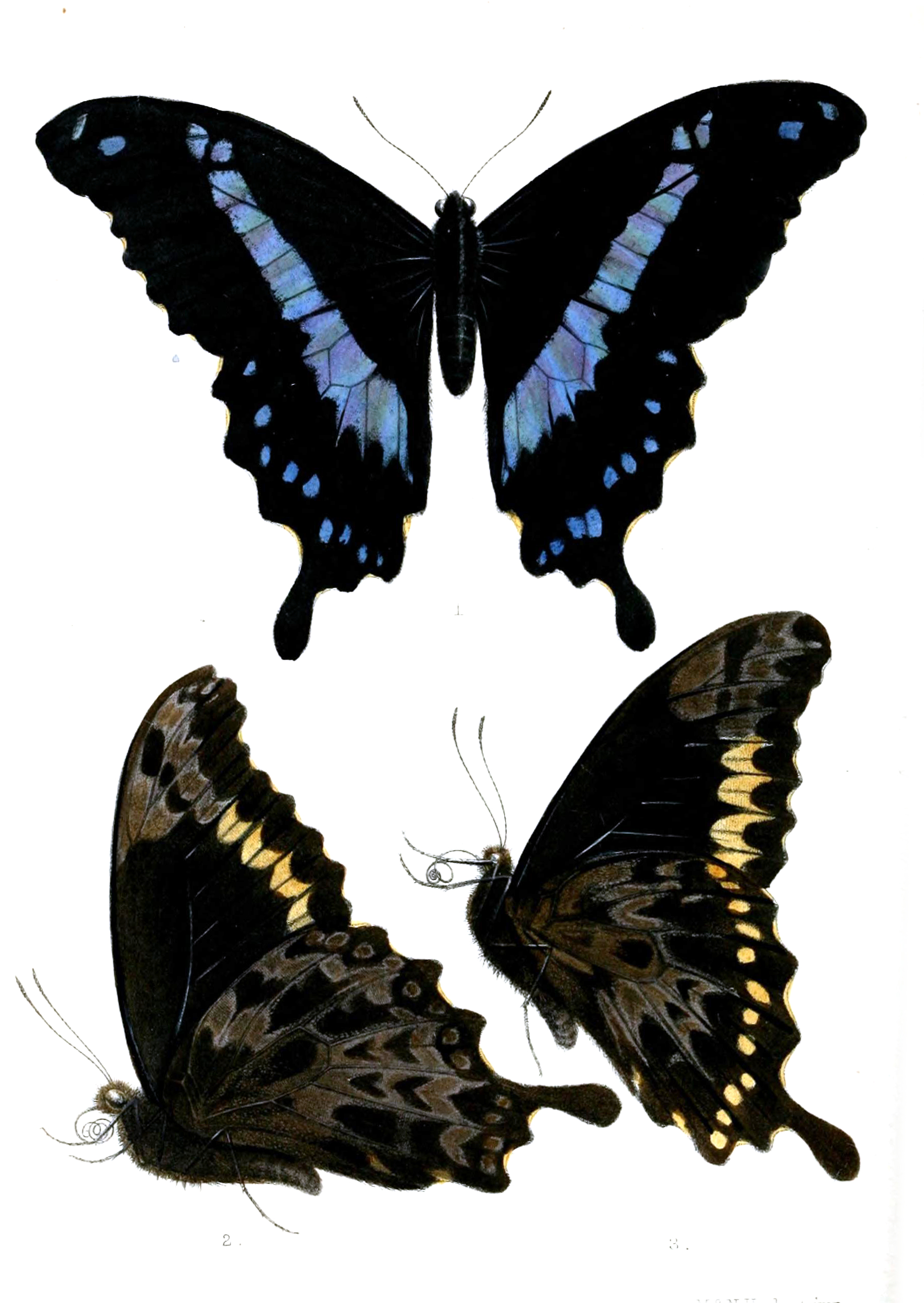

Scientific classification
- Kingdom: Animalia
- Phylum: Arthropoda
- Clade: Pancrustacea
- Class: Insecta
- Order: Lepidoptera
- Family: Papilionidae
- Genus: Papilio
- Species: P. hornimani

Binomial name
- Papilio hornimani Distant, 1879

= Papilio hornimani =

Hornimans green-banded swallowtail

Species of butterfly

Papilio hornimani, the Hornimans green-banded swallowtail or Horniman's swallowtail, is a species of swallowtail butterfly from the genus Papilio that is found in the highland forests of Kenya and Tanzania.

The larvae feed on Vepris and possibly Citrus species.

== Subspecies ==
- Papilio hornimani hornimani (Kenya, Tanzania)
- Papilio hornimani mwanihanae Kielland, 1987 (Tanzania)
- Papilio hornimani mbulu Kielland, 1990 (Tanzania)

== Description ==
The ground colour is black. The markings are metallic blue. The blue band does not reach the hind wing margin in area 1b.Seitz-Only differs from Papilio charopus in that the median band of the upper surface is only a little widened posteriorly, so that the spots of cellules 2 and 8 of the hindwing cover but a third or a quarter of the cellules and are scarcely twice as long as broad; the submarginal spots of the hindwing beneath in the male yellow, very prominent, in the female as in charopus. — German East Africa.

== Taxonomy ==
Papilio hornimani belongs to a clade called the nireus species group with 15 members. The pattern is black with green bands and spots and the butterflies, although called swallowtails, lack tails with the exception of this species and Papilio charopus. The clade members are:

- Papilio aristophontes Oberthür, 1897
- Papilio nireus Linnaeus, 1758
- Papilio charopus Westwood, 1843
- Papilio chitondensis de Sousa & Fernandes, 1966
- Papilio chrapkowskii Suffert, 1904
- Papilio chrapkowskoides Storace, 1952
- Papilio desmondi van Someren, 1939
- Papilio hornimani Distant, 1879
- Papilio interjectana Vane-Wright, 1995
- Papilio manlius Fabricius, 1798
- Papilio microps Storace, 1951
- Papilio sosia Rothschild & Jordan, 1903
- Papilio thuraui Karsch, 1900
- Papilio ufipa Carcasson, 1961
- Papilio wilsoni Rothschild, 1926

== Etymology ==
They are named for Frederick John Horniman.
