= Papilio chitondensis =

Scientific classification
- Kingdom: Animalia
- Phylum: Arthropoda
- Clade: Pancrustacea
- Class: Insecta
- Order: Lepidoptera
- Family: Papilionidae
- Genus: Papilio
- Species: P. chitondensis

Binomial name
- Papilio chitondensis Bivar de Sousa & Fernandes, 1966

Synonyms
- Papilio nireus chitondensis Bivar de Sousa & Fernandes, 1966

Species of butterfly

Papilio chitondensis is a species of swallowtail butterfly from the genus Papilio that is found in Angola.

== Taxonomy ==
Papilio chitondensis belongs to a clade called the nireus species group with 15 members. The pattern is black with green bands and spots and the butterflies, although called swallowtails, lack tails with the exception of Papilio charopus and Papilio hornimani. The clade members are:

- Papilio aristophontes Oberthür, 1897
- Papilio nireus Linnaeus, 1758
- Papilio charopus Westwood, 1843
- Papilio chitondensis de Sousa & Fernandes, 1966
- Papilio chrapkowskii Suffert, 1904
- Papilio chrapkowskoides Storace, 1952
- Papilio desmondi van Someren, 1939
- Papilio hornimani Distant, 1879
- Papilio interjectana Vane-Wright, 1995
- Papilio manlius Fabricius, 1798
- Papilio microps Storace, 1951
- Papilio sosia Rothschild & Jordan, 1903
- Papilio thuraui Karsch, 1900
- Papilio ufipa Carcasson, 1961
- Papilio wilsoni Rothschild, 1926
