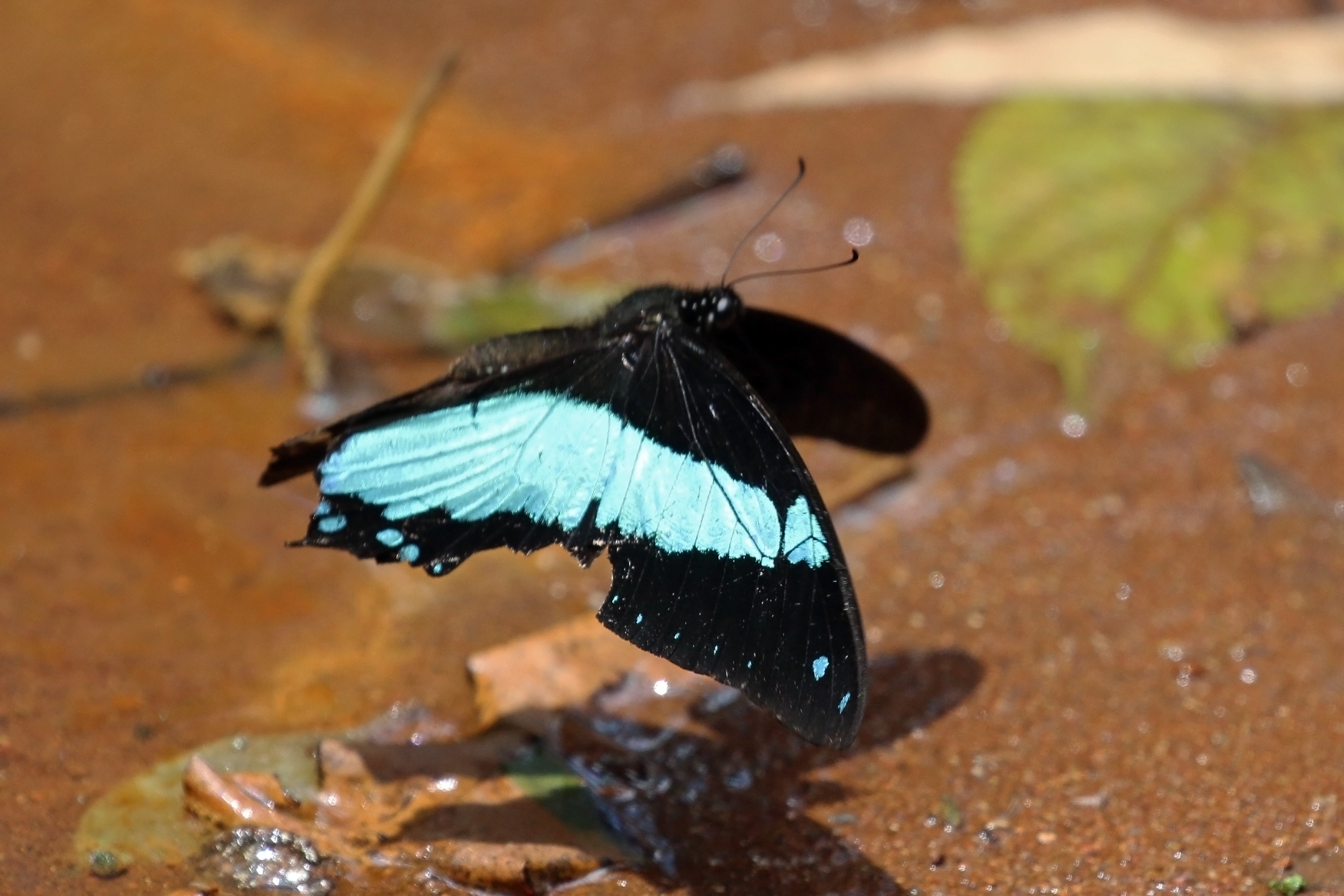

Scientific classification
- Kingdom: Animalia
- Phylum: Arthropoda
- Clade: Pancrustacea
- Class: Insecta
- Order: Lepidoptera
- Family: Papilionidae
- Genus: Papilio
- Species: P. chrapkowskii

Binomial name
- Papilio chrapkowskii Suffert, 1904

Synonyms
- Papilio bromius var. brontia Strand, 1911; Papilio bromius chrapkowskii ab. obliterata Dufrane, 1946; Papilio bromius chrapkowskii ab. addenda Storace, 1951

= Papilio chrapkowskii =

Broad green-banded swallowtail

Species of butterfly

Papilio chrapkowskii, the broad green-banded swallowtail or Chrapkowski's green-banded swallowtail, is a species of swallowtail butterfly from the genus Papilio that is found in Uganda, Kenya and Tanzania.

The larvae feed on Vepris species.

== Description ==
The ground colour is black and the light areas greenish blue. The submarginal spots on forewings below are well developed. The hindwing verso is strongly mottled with silky purplish brown.The blue spot in the cell of the forewing above reaches basad about to the middle of cellule 2; forewing beneath with large yellowish submarginal spots in cellules 1 b—4. British East Africa: Nairobi.

== Taxonomy ==
Papilio chrapkowskii belongs to a clade called the nireus species group with 15 members. The pattern is black with green or blue bands and spots and the butterflies, although called swallowtails lack tails with the exception of Papilio charopus and Papilio hornimani. The clade members are:

- Papilio aristophontes Oberthür, 1897
- Papilio nireus Linnaeus, 1758
- Papilio charopus Westwood, 1843
- Papilio chitondensis de Sousa & Fernandes, 1966
- Papilio chrapkowskii Suffert, 1904
- Papilio chrapkowskoides Storace, 1952
- Papilio desmondi van Someren, 1939
- Papilio hornimani Distant, 1879
- Papilio interjectana Vane-Wright, 1995
- Papilio manlius Fabricius, 1798
- Papilio microps Storace, 1951
- Papilio sosia Rothschild & Jordan, 1903
- Papilio thuraui Karsch, 1900
- Papilio ufipa Carcasson, 1961
- Papilio wilsoni Rothschild, 1926

== Description ==
It is smaller than Papilio chrapkowskoides with the blue band narrower. Submarginal spots on the forewing are below well developed. Hindwing below strongly mottled with silky purplish brown.

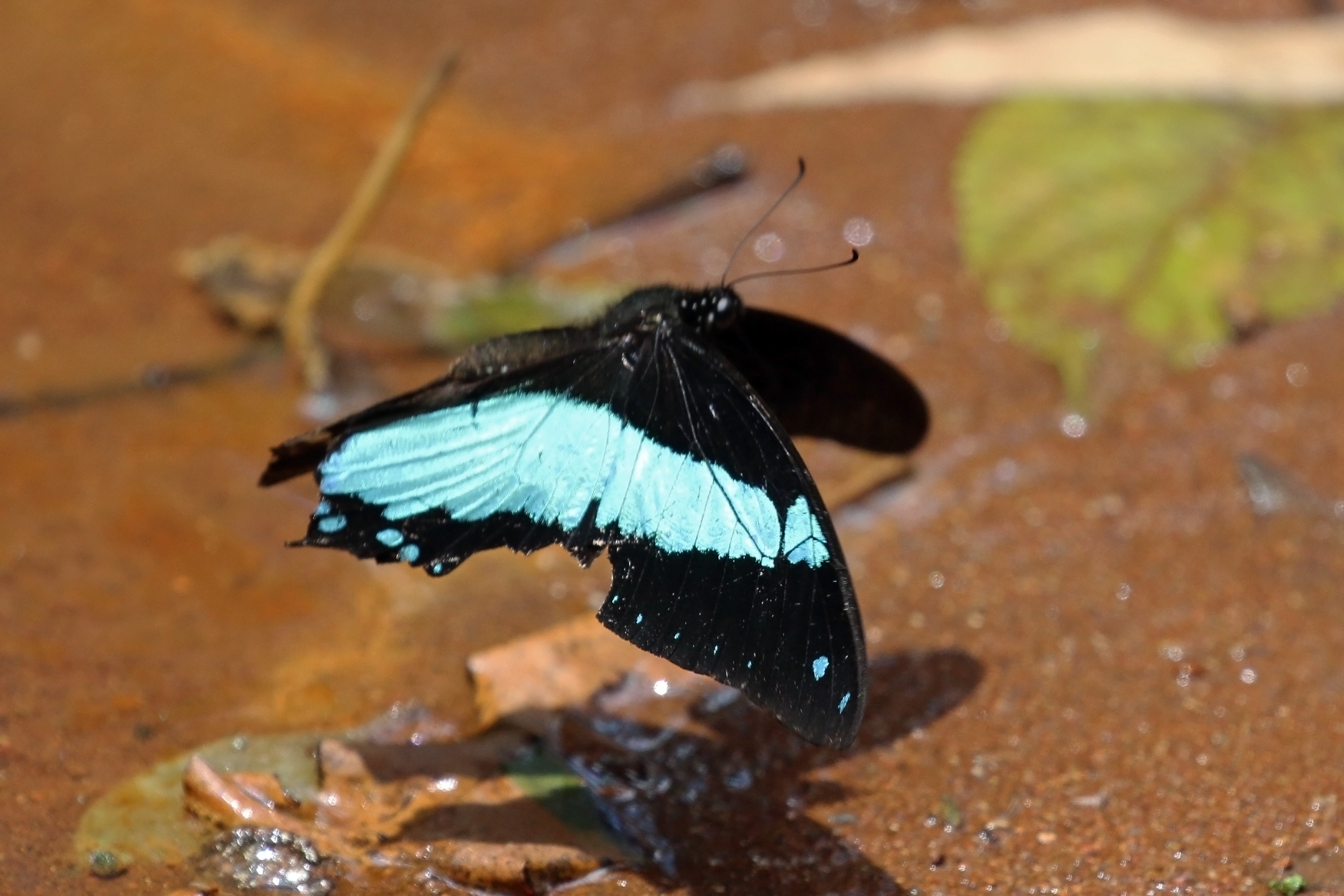
in the Kakamega Forest, Kenya

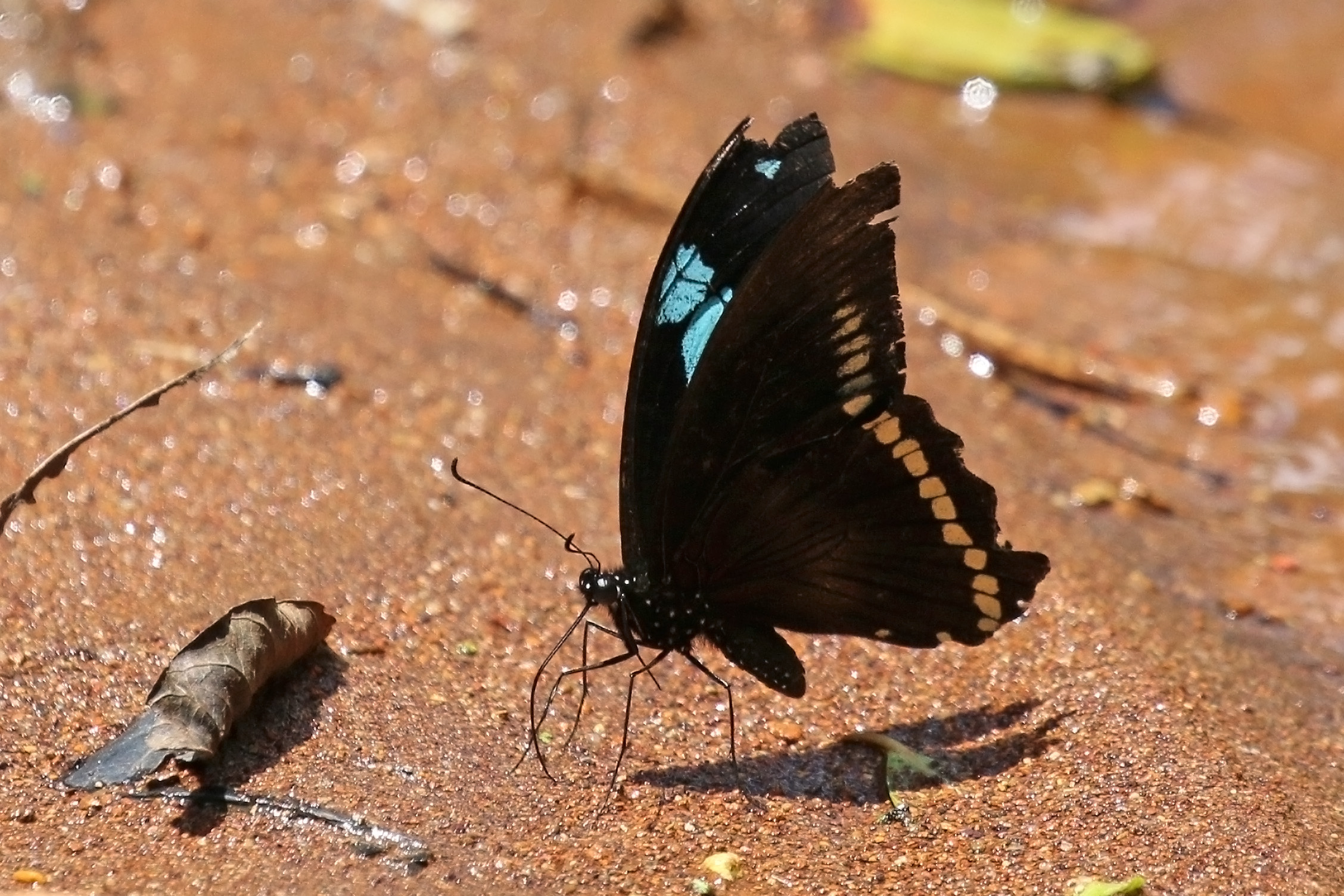
in the Kakamega Forest, Kenya

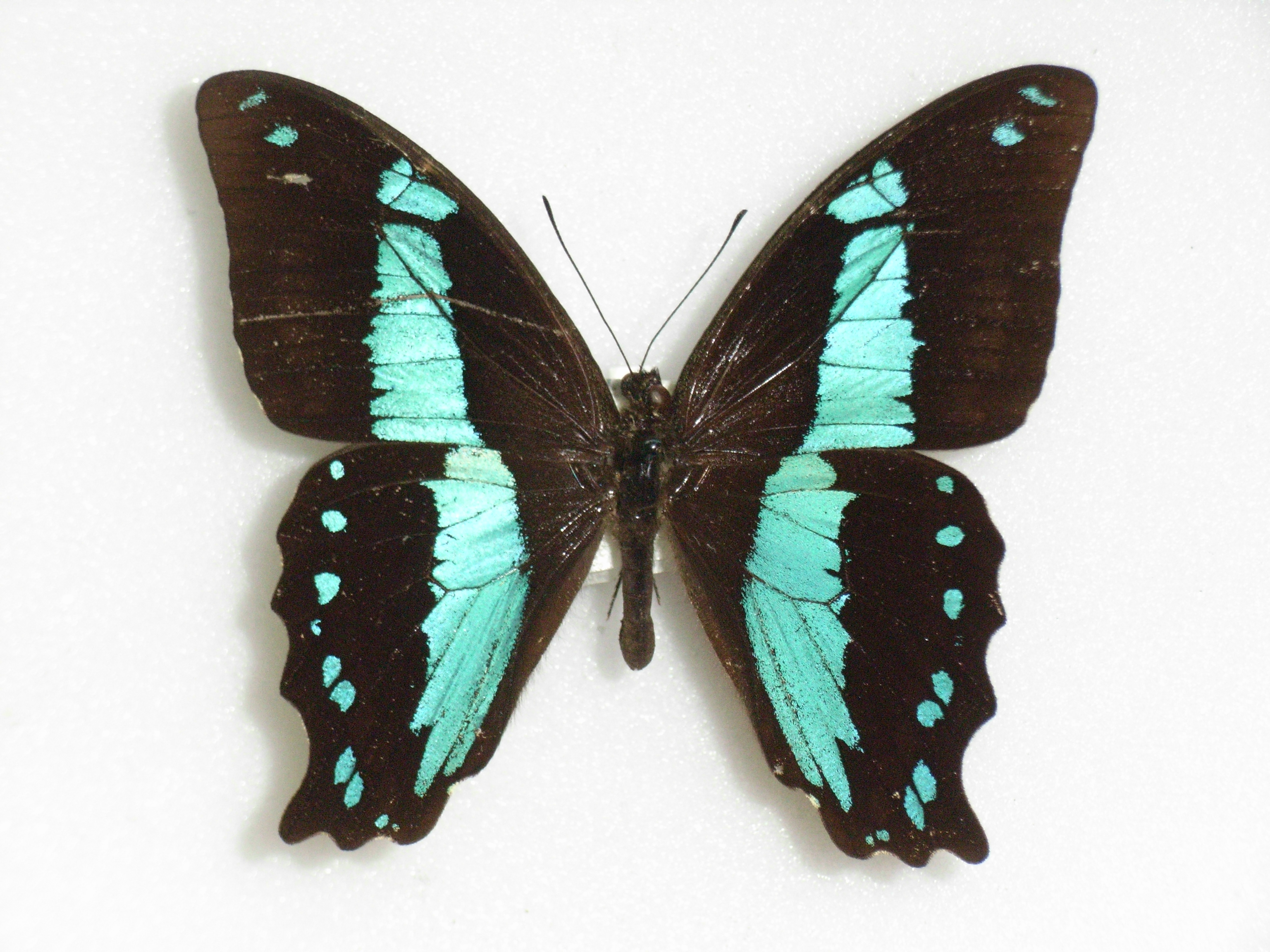

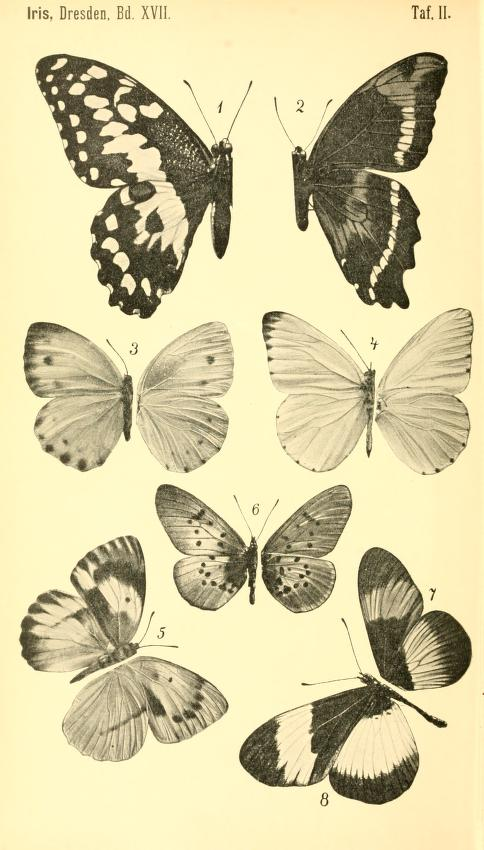
Suffert's original description (Fig.2)
