= Luciano Storace =

Italian entomologist

Luciano Storace (22 July 1922, Genoa -5 August 2001, Genoa) was an Italian entomologist who specialised in Lepidoptera He wrote many scientific publications notably on the taxonomy of the butterflies of Africa. His collection is in Museo Civico di Storia Naturale di Genova where he was employed. Luciano Storace was a Member of Società Entomologica Italiana.
