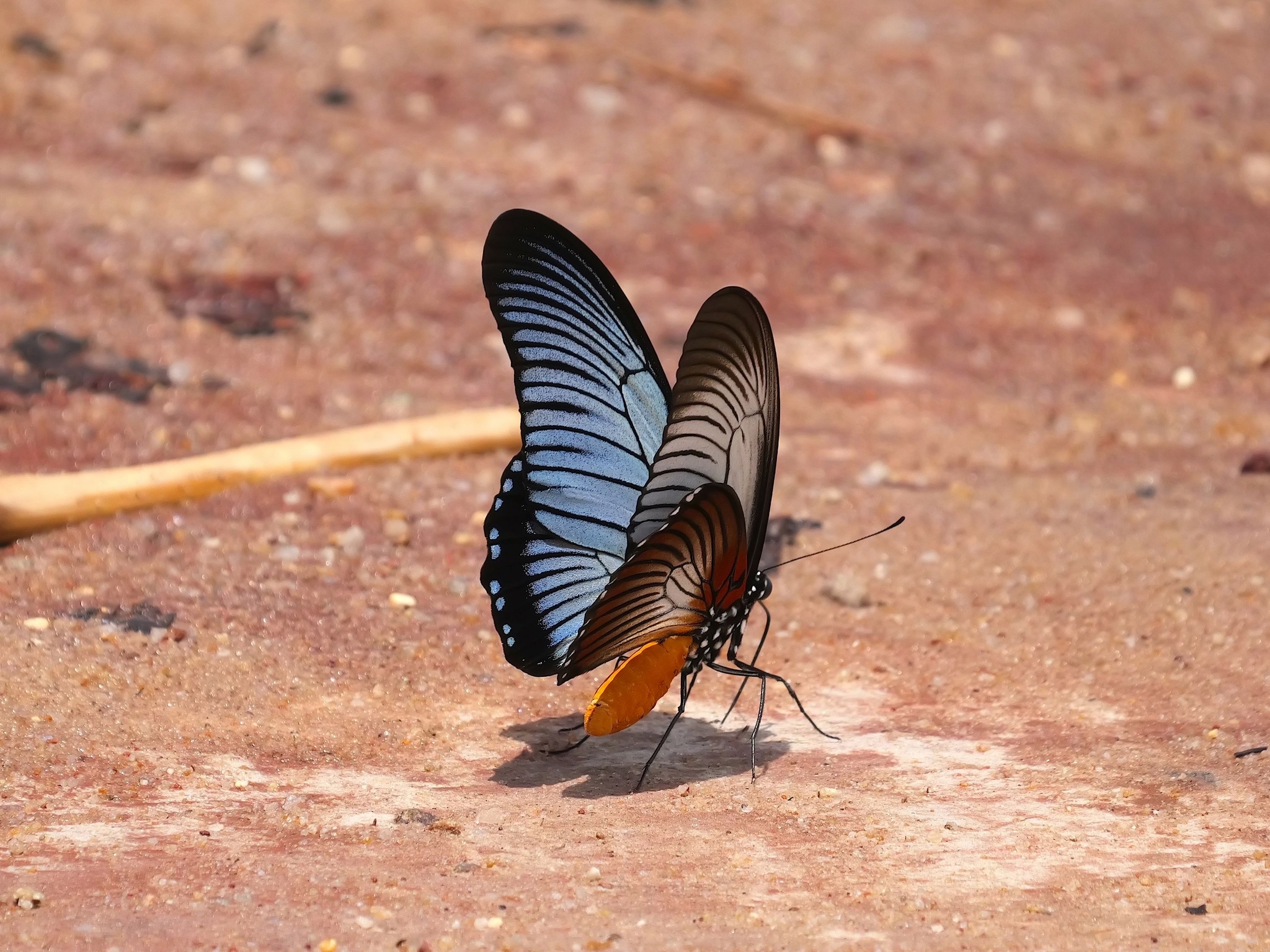
- Upperside
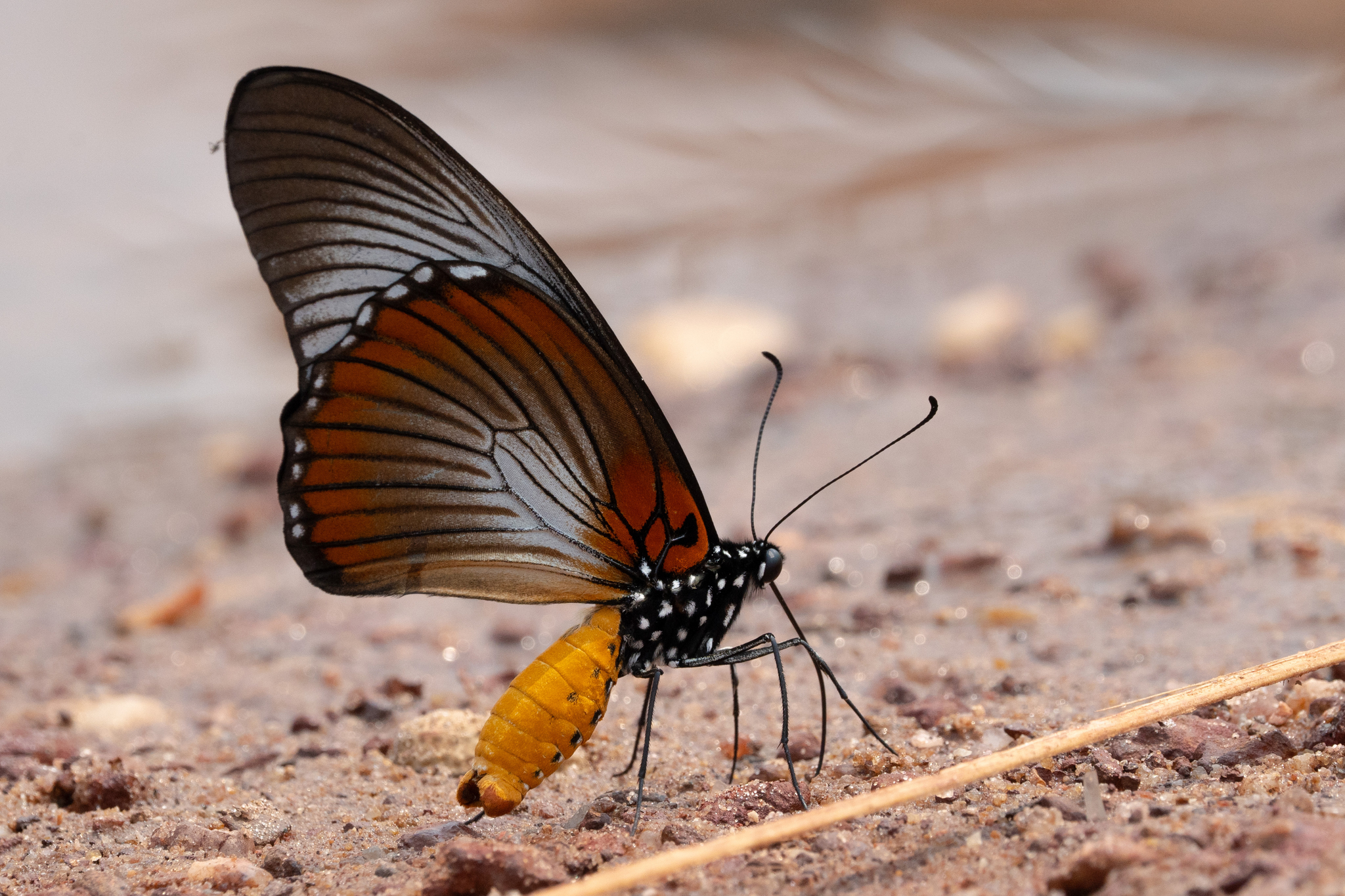
- Underside

Scientific classification
- Kingdom: Animalia
- Phylum: Arthropoda
- Clade: Pancrustacea
- Class: Insecta
- Order: Lepidoptera
- Family: Papilionidae
- Genus: Papilio
- Species: P. zalmoxis

Binomial name
- Papilio zalmoxis Hewitson, 1864

Synonyms
- Icarus zalmoxis f. sufferti Röber, 1898; Icarus zalmoxis f. ripponi Röber, 1898; Papilio zalmoxis ab. cinereus Schultze, 1913

= Papilio zalmoxis =

Giant blue swallowtail

Species of butterfly

Papilio zalmoxis, the giant blue swallowtail, is an African butterfly belonging to the family Papilionidae. The name of the species is given in honor of Zalmoxis – a divinity of the Getae (a people of the lower Danube), mentioned by Herodotus in his Histories IV, 93–96.

== Description ==
Papilio zalmoxis has a wingspan reaching about 12–16 centimetres (4.7–6.3 in) and it is the second largest African swallowtail. The colour of the upperside of the wings is usually blue but can be greenish, contrasting with the light-gray color of the underside of the wings. Previously thought to produce the blue colour by Tyndall scattering, the scales of Papilio zalmoxis are not nanostructured for incoherent scattering, instead the blue is a fluorescent pigmentary colour.

The uppersides of the forewings have narrow black stripes between black veins. The tip of the wings is black. Uppersides of the hindwings have a black marginal band, with a chain of blue spots. The body is bright yellow. Females are slightly smaller than males, and less brightly colored. The background colour of its wings is yellowish brown.

Torben Larsen developed a species numbering system for his 2005 publication Butterflies of West Africa. This species is #2. The 'Larsen' numbers have since been used with permission in A Sharp Eye on Butterflies of Ghana.

== Distribution ==
Papilio zalmoxis is an African butterfly, living in tropical areas (Liberia, Ghana, Cameroon, Nigeria, Gabon, Democratic Republic of the Congo, Zaire, Ivory Coast).

== Gallery ==
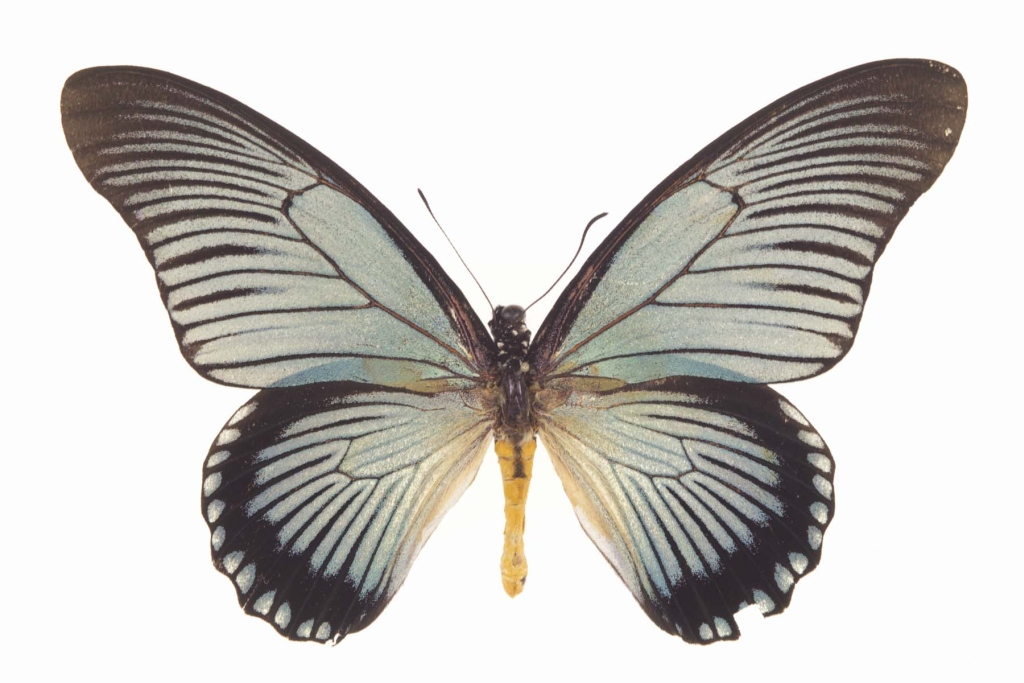
From the Central African Republic – mounted specimen

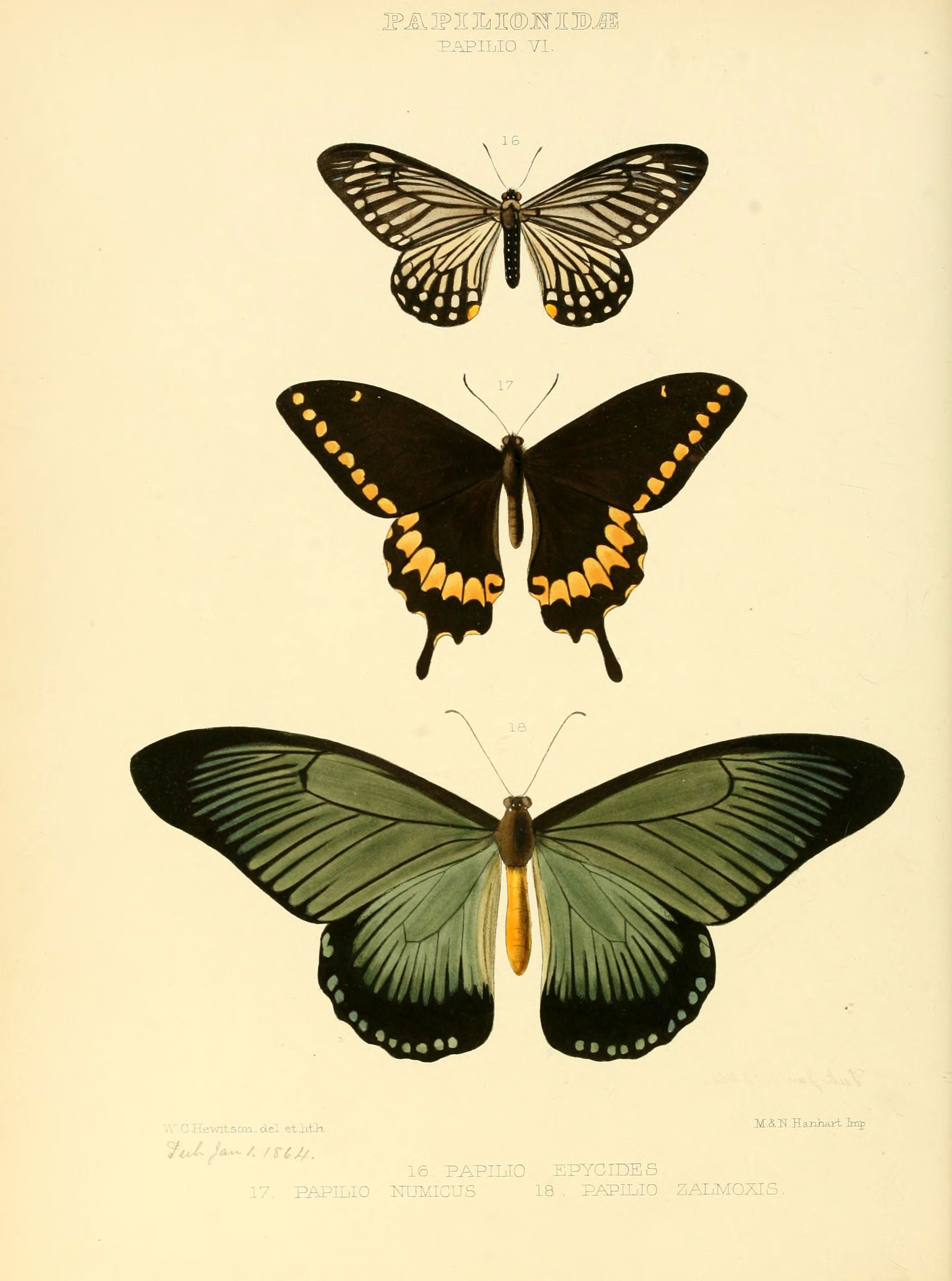
Hewitson's illustration

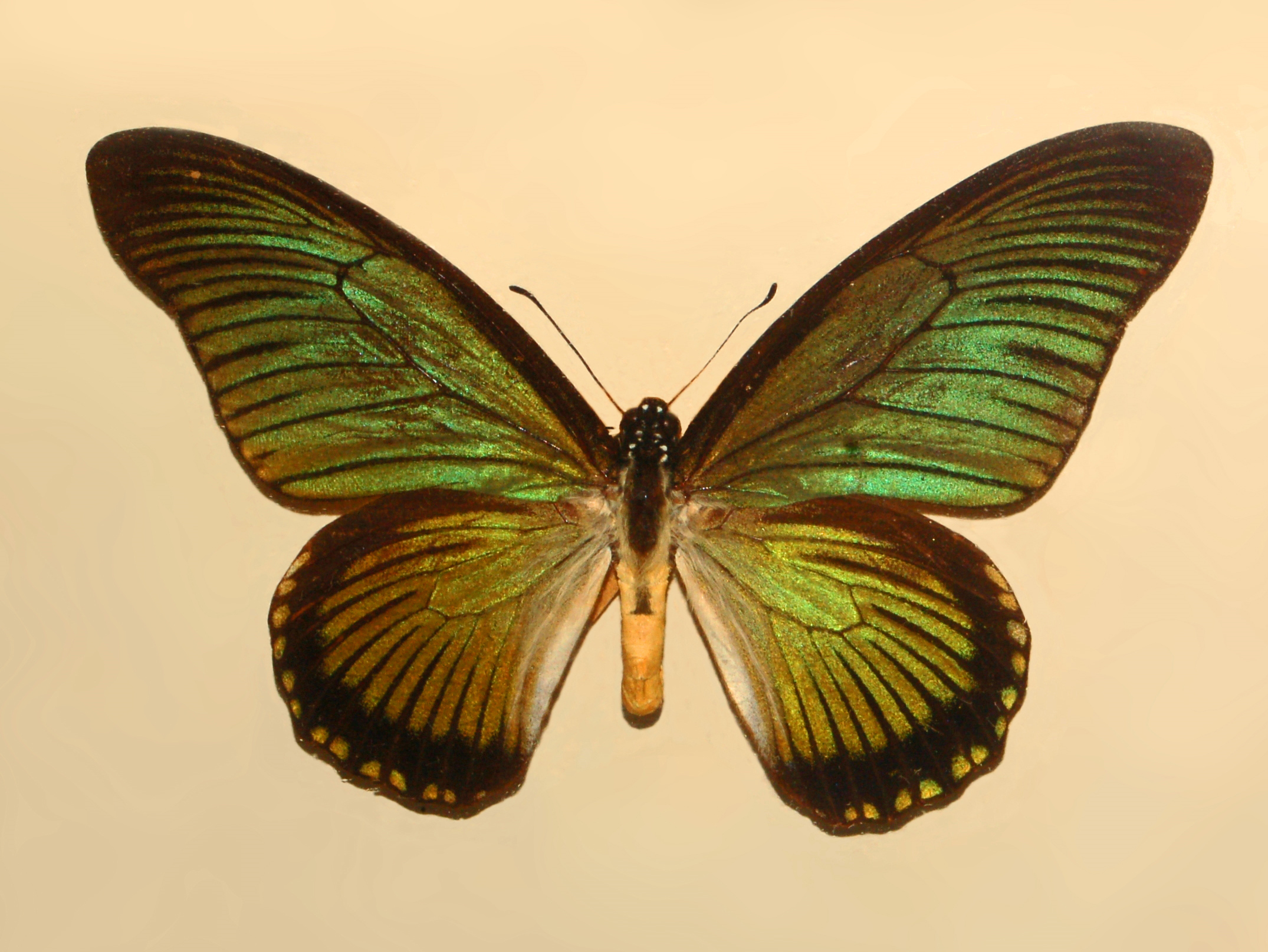
green sheen, from the Democratic Republic of the Congo
