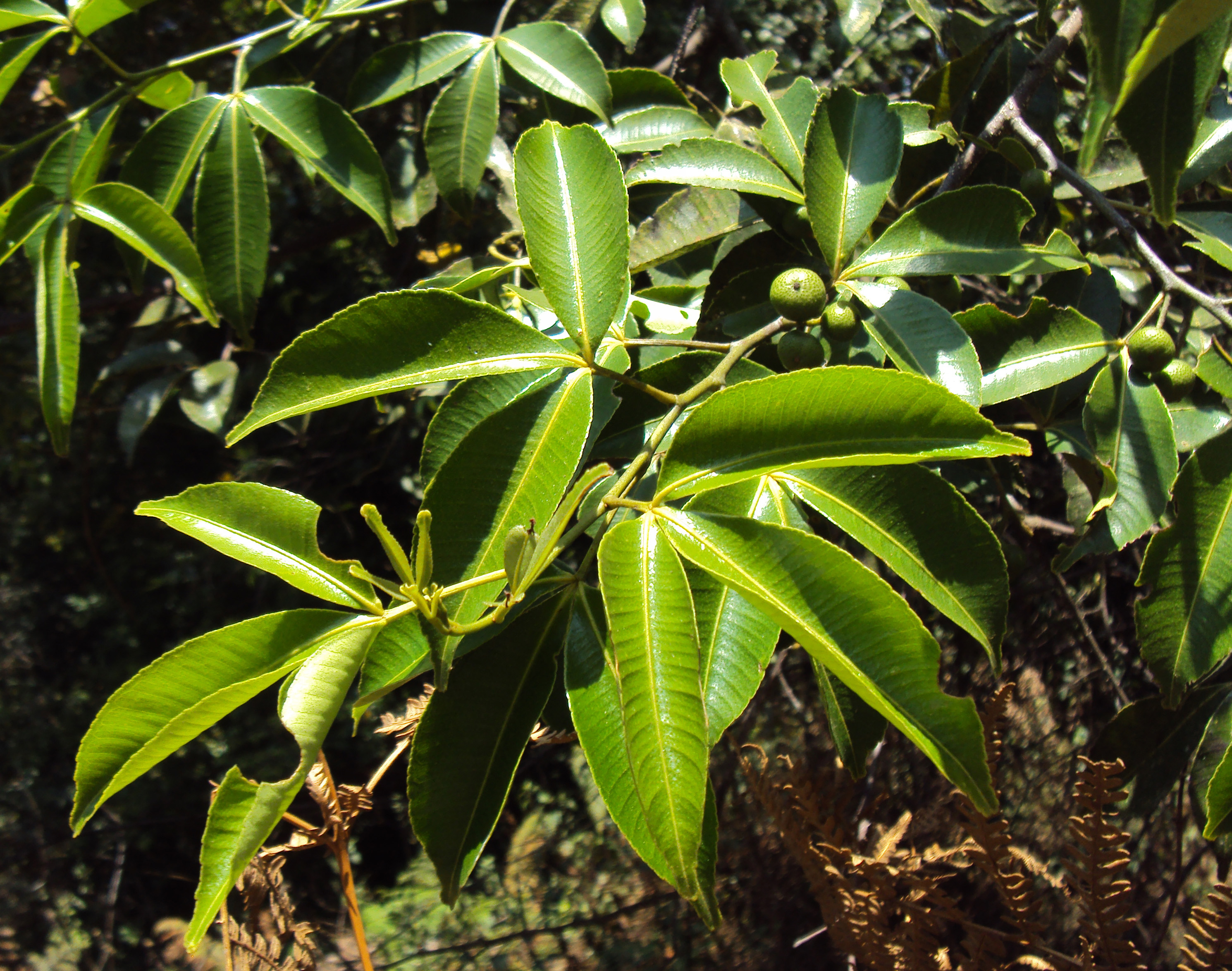
- Leaves and fruits
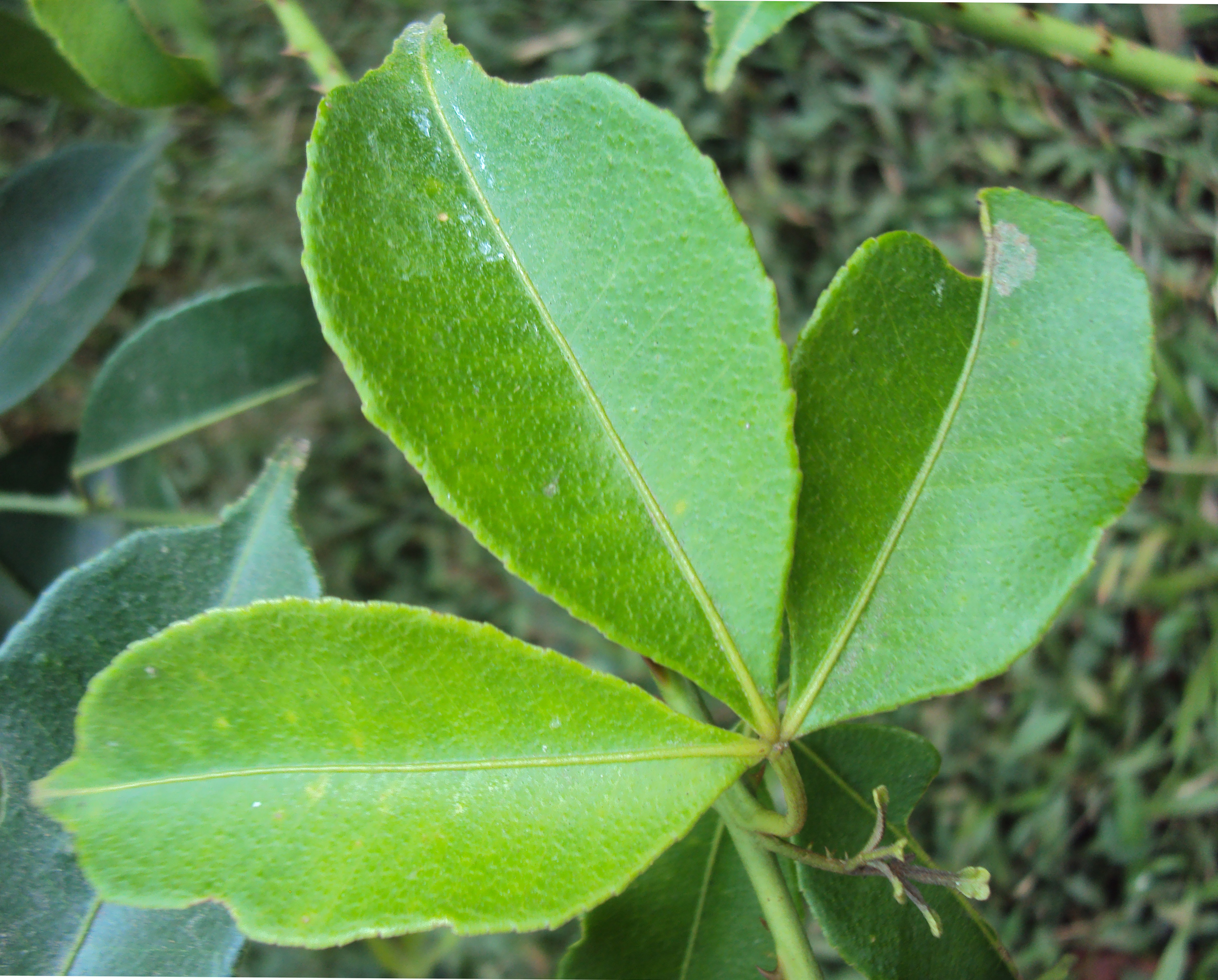

Scientific classification
- Kingdom: Plantae
- Clade: Tracheophytes
- Clade: Angiosperms
- Clade: Eudicots
- Clade: Rosids
- Order: Sapindales
- Family: Rutaceae
- Genus: Zanthoxylum
- Species: Z. asiaticum

Binomial name
- Zanthoxylum asiaticum (L.) Appelhans, Groppo & J.Wen

Synonyms
- Cranzia aculeata Oken; Cranzia asiatica (L.) Kuntze; Cranzia nitida Kuntze; Cranzia schmidelioides (Baker) Kuntze; Cranzia willdenowii Kuntze; Limonia oligandra Dalzell; Rubentia angustifolia Bojer ex Steud.; Scopolia angustifolia Spreng.; Scopolia micracantha Blume; Scopolia nitida Willd. ex Spreng.; Toddalia aculeata Pers.; Toddalia ambigua Turcz.; Toddalia angustifolia Lam.; Toddalia asiatica (L.) Lam.; Toddalia asiatica var. parva Z.M.Tan; Toddalia effusa Turcz.; Toddalia floribunda Wall.; Toddalia micrantha (Blume) Steud.; Toddalia nitida Lam.; Toddalia rubicaulis Schult.; Toddalia schmidelioides Baker; Toddalia tonkinensis Guillaumin; Toddalia willdenowii Steud.; Zanthoxylum floribundum Wall.; Zanthoxylum nitidum Wall.; Paullinia asiatica L.; Scopolia aculeata Sm.

= Zanthoxylum asiaticum =

Species of plant

Zanthoxylum asiaticum is a species of plant in the family Rutaceae. Under its synonym Toddalia asiatica, it was the only species in the monotypic genus Toddalia, now included in Zanthoxylum. It is known by the English name orange climber.

== Description ==
This is a liana with woody, corky, thorny stems that climb on trees, reaching up to 10 m in length. It has shiny green citrus-scented leaves, yellow-green flowers, and orange fruits about half a cm wide that taste like orange peel. The seeds are dispersed by birds and monkeys that eat the fruits. In particular, the scaly-breasted munia prefers to nest in these trees.

== Distribution ==
It is native to many countries in Africa and Asia. Examples include South Africa where in Afrikaans it is called ranklemoentjie, and in Venda, gwambadzi. It is very popular among the Kikuyus of Central Kenya, where it is known as mururue, Mauritius, where it is known as patte poule or properly mũrũrũe.

== Habitat ==
It grows in forested riparian habitat with high rainfall. The destruction of forest habitat in Africa threatens the species' survival.

== Fossil record ==
Fossil seeds assigned to Toddalia (now included in Zanthoxylum) have been described as Toddalia nanlinensis from the Miocene of Nanlin Formation in Longchuan Basin, Dehong Autonomous Prefecture, Yunnan Province, China. The fossil seeds are boat-shaped with tegmen that is composed of thin-walled cells with fine criss-crossed spiral lignifications.

== Medicinal uses ==
The plant is used medicinally by many African peoples, including the Maasai, who use it for malaria, cough, and influenza. The roots contain coumarins that have antiplasmodial activity. Extracts of the plant have demonstrated antiviral activity against H1N1 influenza in the laboratory. The harvest of this slow-growing plant from the wild for medicinal use may cause its populations to decline.

Protocols for domestication or propagation of the tree are being researched.
