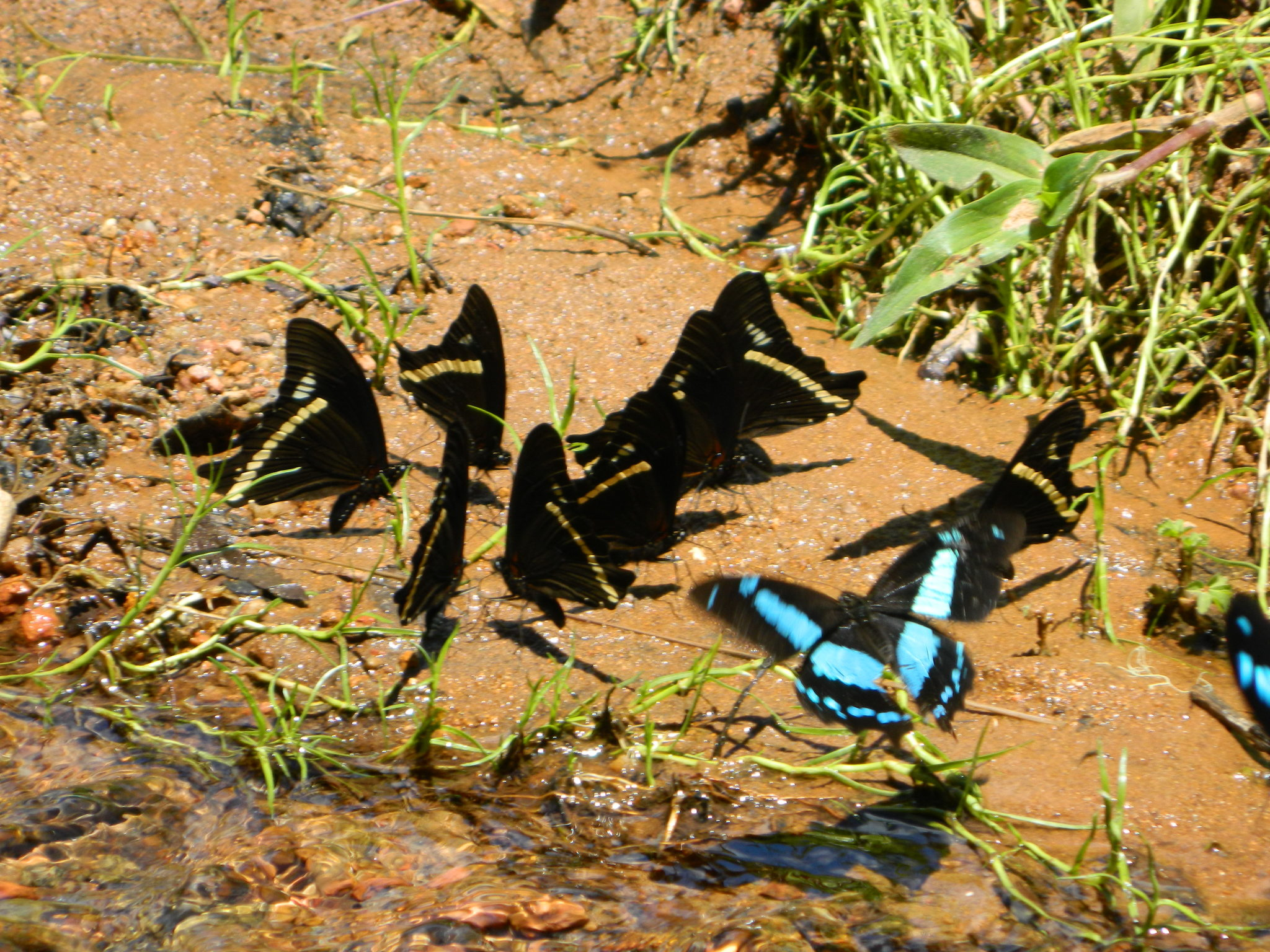
- Mud-puddling

Scientific classification
- Kingdom: Animalia
- Phylum: Arthropoda
- Clade: Pancrustacea
- Class: Insecta
- Order: Lepidoptera
- Family: Papilionidae
- Genus: Papilio
- Species: P. desmondi

Binomial name
- Papilio desmondi Van Someren, 1939

Synonyms
- Papilio magdae Gifford, 1961; Papilio brontes Godman, 1885; Papilio teita van Someren, 1960; Papilio brontes australis van Someren, 1960

= Papilio desmondi =

Desmond's green-banded swallowtail

Species of butterfly

Papilio desmondi, the Desmond's green-banded swallowtail, is a butterfly of the family Papilionidae. It is found in Africa.

The larvae feed on Vepris eugeniifolia, other Vepris species, Clausena, Zanthoxylum, Calodendrum, and Citrus species.

== Subspecies ==
- Papilio desmondi desmondi (Chyulu Hills of south-eastern Kenya)
- Papilio desmondi magdae Gifford, 1961 . (northern Tanzania)
- Papilio desmondi teita van Someren, 1960 (south-eastern Kenya)
- Papilio desmondi usambaraensis (Koçak, 1980) (Tanzania, northern Malawi, north-eastern Zambia)

== Description ==
The blue median band of the upper surface is somewhat narrower than in Papilio desmondi and the spot in the cell of the forewing reaches basad at most to vein 3.Forewing beneath with large yellowish submarginal spots in cellules 1 b—4. Found in east Africa, including Kenya, Tanzania, Zambia, and Malawi. There are sharp nervular indentations at the margin of the blue band in the fore wing.

== Taxonomy ==
Papilio desmondi belongs to a clade called the nireus species group with 15 members. The pattern is black with green or blue bands and spots and the butterflies, although called swallowtails lack tails with the exception of Papilio charopus and Papilio hornimani.
