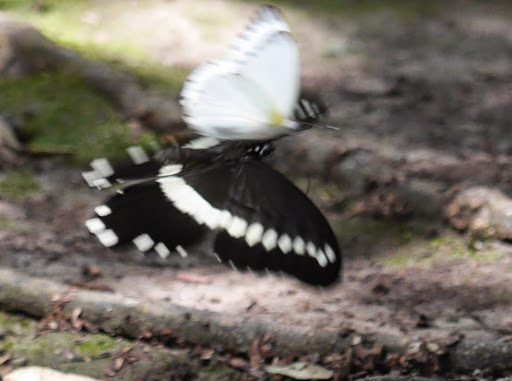
- Upperside
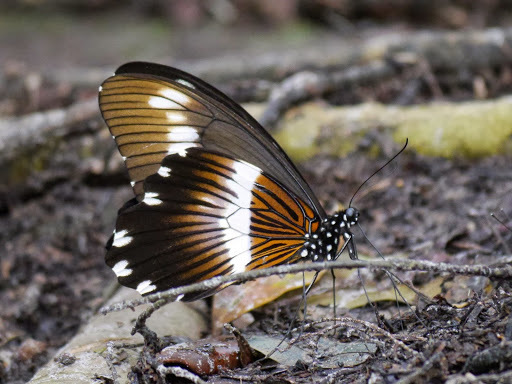
- Underside

Scientific classification
- Kingdom: Animalia
- Phylum: Arthropoda
- Clade: Pancrustacea
- Class: Insecta
- Order: Lepidoptera
- Family: Papilionidae
- Genus: Papilio
- Species: P. gallienus

Binomial name
- Papilio gallienus Distant, 1879

Synonyms
- Papilio cypraeafila gallienus Distant, 1879; Papilio gallienus gallienus ab. vreuricki Dufrane, 1936; Papilio gallienus gallienus ab. ochreata Dufrane, 1936; Papilio gallienus ab. hulstaerti Berger, 1950

= Papilio gallienus =

Species of butterfly

Papilio gallienus, the narrow-banded swallowtail, is a butterfly of the family Papilionidae. It is found in Nigeria, Cameroon, the Democratic Republic of the Congo and the central part of the Republic of the Congo.

== Taxonomy ==
Papilio gallienus is very similar to Papilio mechowi but males of gallienus have a distinct androconial patch and the discal spots of the forewings have diffuse edges. The outer edge of the forewing discal band is straighter in gallienus. Both are members of the zenobia species group. In the zenobia group the basic upperside wing pattern is black with white or yellowish bands and spots. The underside is brown and basally there is a red area marked with black stripes and spots. In the discal area there is a yellowish band with black stripes and veins. Females resemble Amauris butterflies. Both sexes lack tails.

The clade members are:

- Papilio cyproeofila Butler, 1868
- Papilio fernandus Fruhstorfer, 1903
- Papilio filaprae Suffert, 1904
- Papilio gallienus Distant, 1879
- Papilio mechowi Dewitz, 1881
- Papilio mechowianus Dewitz, 1885
- Papilio nobicea Suffert, 1904
- Papilio zenobia Fabricius, 1775

== Description ==
It is very similar to Papilio cyproeofila but has cream-yellow rather than cream-white bands, and the hindwing band is much narrower than in P. cyproeofila and curved on the inner edge.

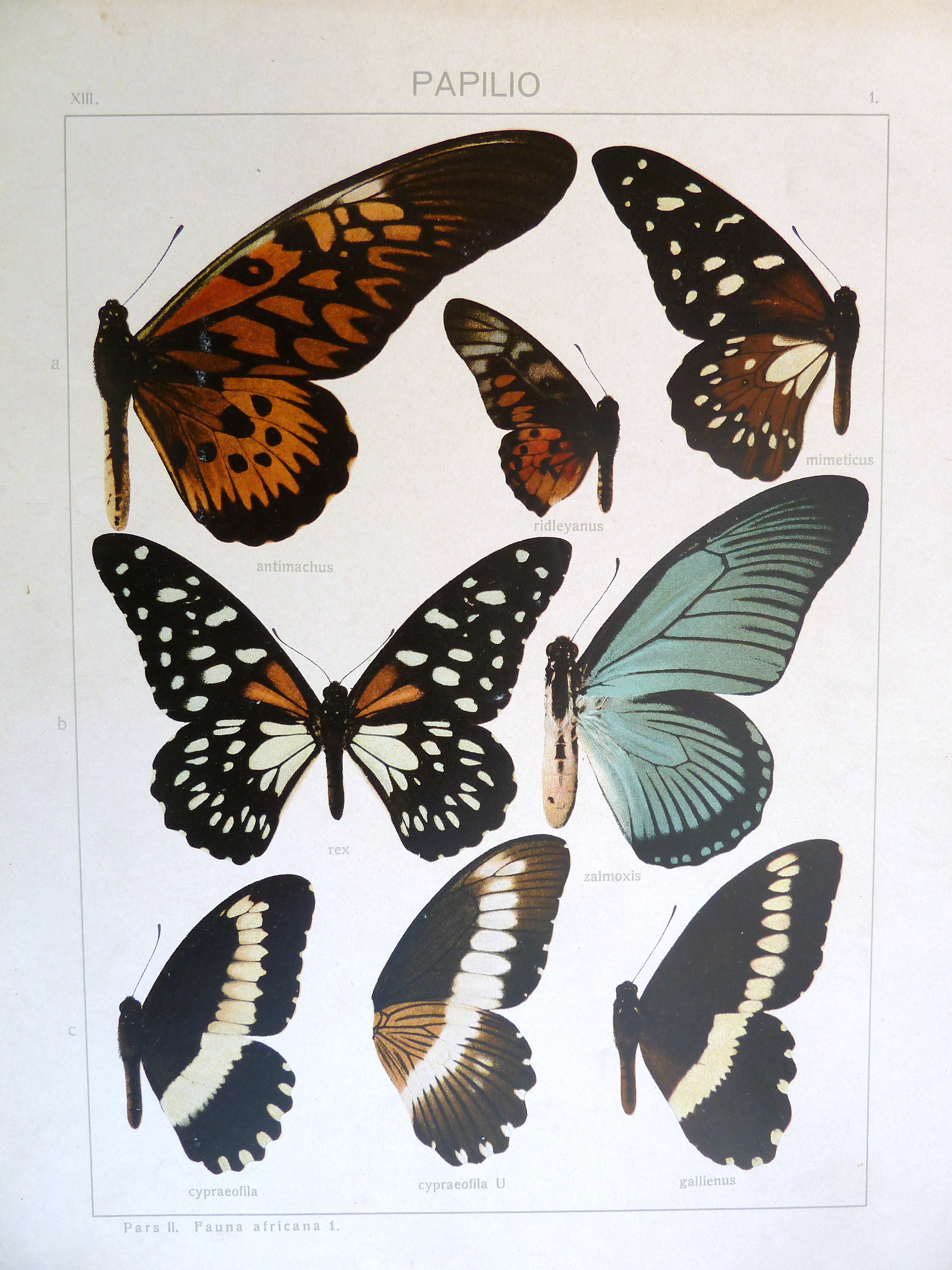
Plate from Seitz showing P. cyproeofila and P. gallienus
