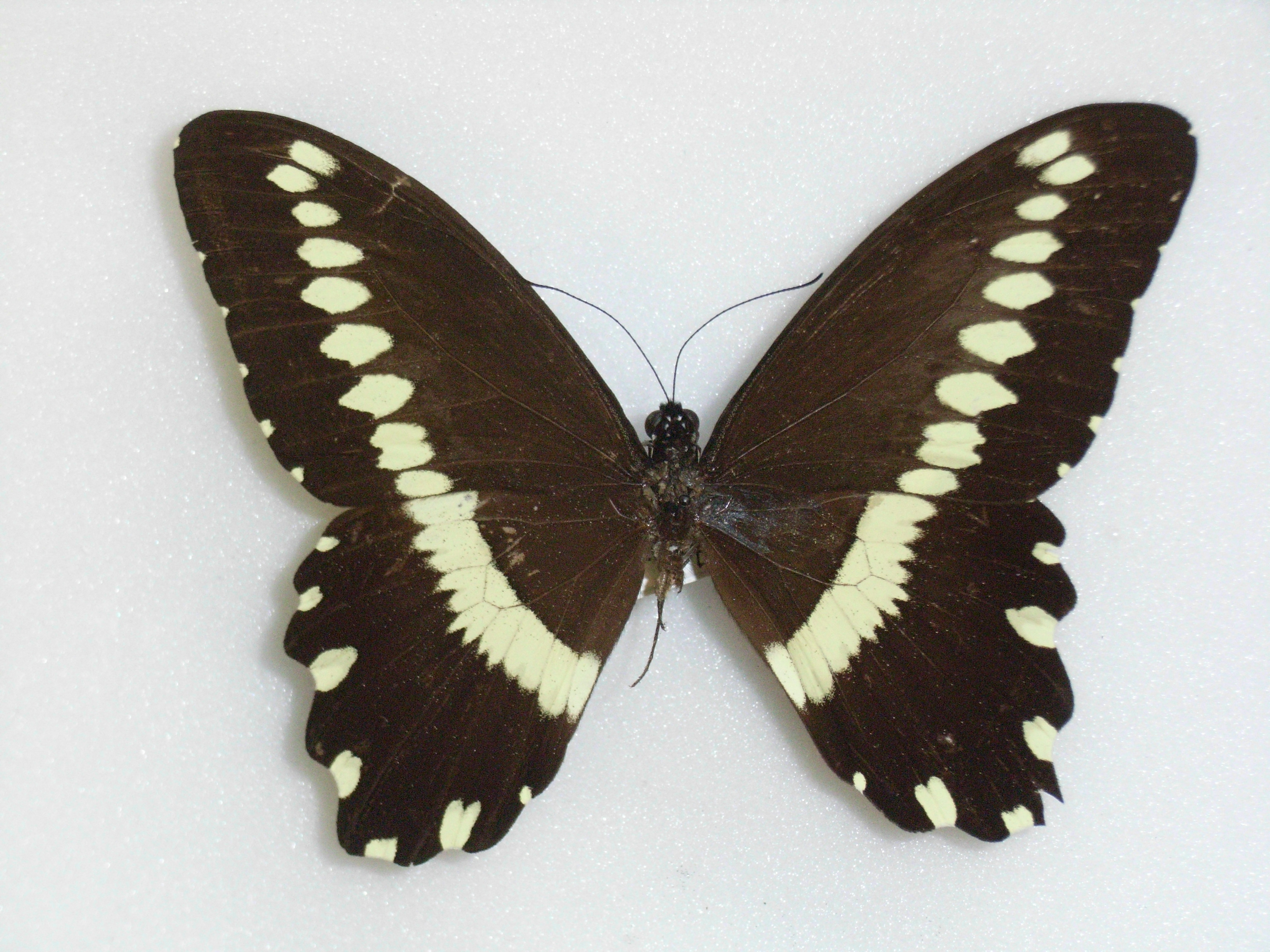
- Upperside
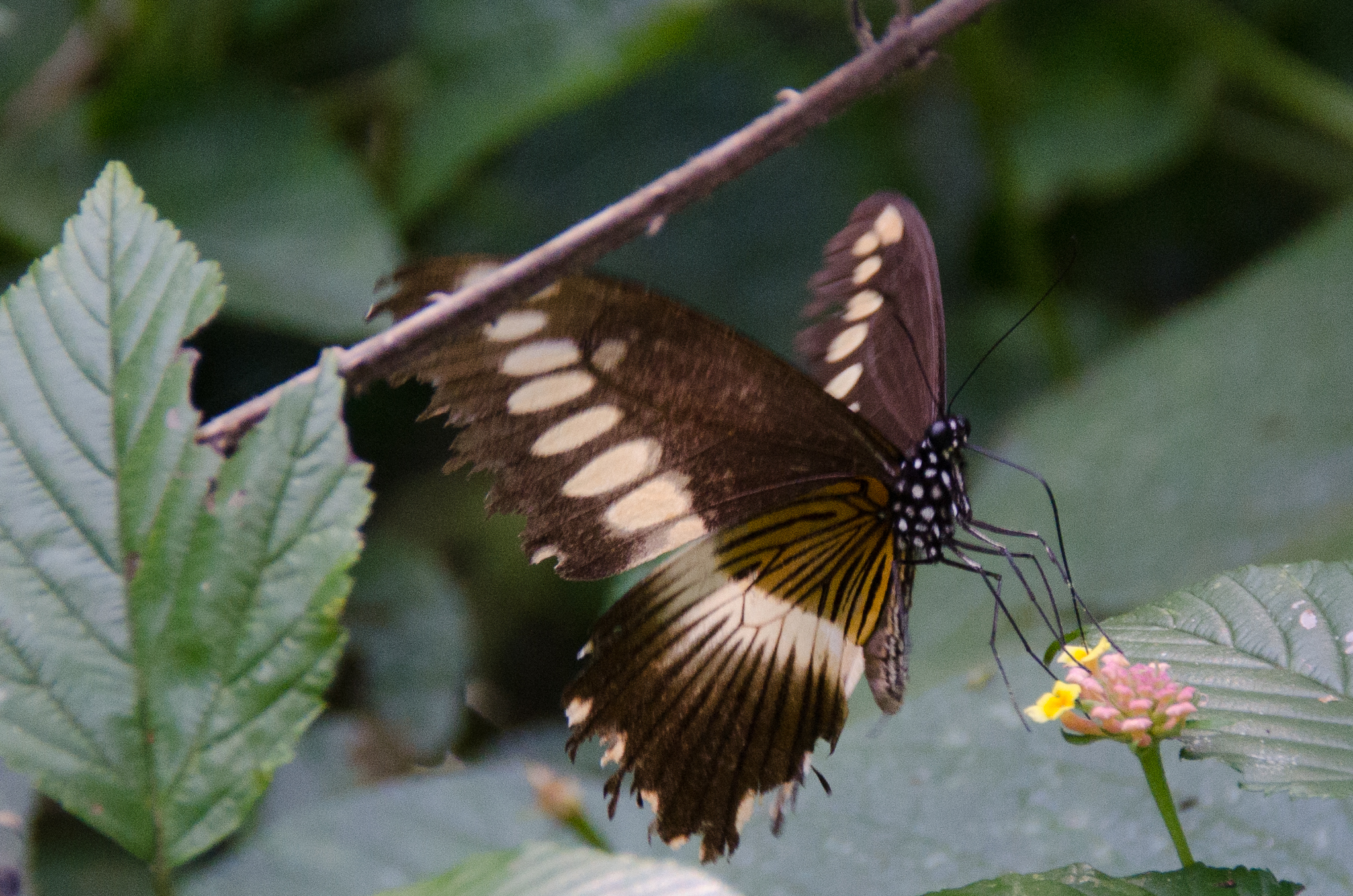
- Underside

Scientific classification
- Kingdom: Animalia
- Phylum: Arthropoda
- Clade: Pancrustacea
- Class: Insecta
- Order: Lepidoptera
- Family: Papilionidae
- Genus: Papilio
- Species: P. mechowi

Binomial name
- Papilio mechowi Dewitz, 1881

Synonyms
- Druryia mechowi; Papilio mechowi mechowi ab. albomaculata Berger, 1950; Papilio gallienus whitnalli Neave, 1904

= Papilio mechowi =

Species of butterfly

Papilio mechowi is a butterfly of the family Papilionidae found in Africa.

== Subspecies ==
- Papilio mechowi mechowi (Cameroon, Congo, Central African Republic, southern Sudan, Uganda, Republic of the Congo, Angola)
- Papilio mechowi whitnalli Neave, 1904 (central and eastern Uganda)

== Taxonomy ==
Papilio mechowi is very similar to Papilio gallienus but males lack the distinct androconial patch of gallienus and the discal spots of the forewings have sharper edges. The outer edge of the forewing discal band is more curved in mechowi. Both are members of the zenobia species group. In the zenobia group the basic upperside wing pattern is black with white or yellowish bands and spots. The underside is brown and basally there is a red area marked with black stripes and spots. In the discal area there is a yellowish band with black stripes and veins. Females resemble butterflies of the genus Amauris. Both sexes lack tails.

The clade members are:

- Papilio cyproeofila Butler, 1868
- Papilio fernandus Fruhstorfer, 1903
- Papilio filaprae Suffert, 1904
- Papilio gallienus Distant, 1879
- Papilio mechowi Dewitz, 1881
- Papilio mechowianus Dewitz, 1885
- Papilio nobicea Suffert, 1904
- Papilio zenobia Fabricius, 1775

== Description ==
It is very similar to Papilio cyproeofila. It differs from P. mechowianus in having the white band narrow. Robert Herbert Carcasson (1960) described it as: "Large, tail-less. Hindwing sharply angled at vein 4; a continuous pale yellow median band in male broken into large internervular spots in forewing. A series of large prominent yellow spots at margin of hindwing. Female has a broader yellow band. In the lower and denser forests of the Congo it is replaced by P.gallienus Distant, with which it has been confused."

== Description ==
The wingspan is about 100–110 mm. The forewings are dark brown. A chain of yellowish spots dominates the wing. The underside is very similar to the upside. But, the basic colour is brown.

The hindwings are dark brown. The edge is wavy. A thin, yellowish band dominates the wing. At the edge there is a chain of yellowish spots.

The underside is brown. Next to the body there are many black stripes and veins. In the middle of the wing there is a thin, yellowish band. At the edge there is a chain of yellowish spots.

The body (abdomen) is dark brown. The thorax and the head are dark brown. The underside of all parts is brown.

== Status ==
It is considered common and not threatened.

== Biogeographic realm ==
Afrotropical realm.

== Etymology ==
P. mechowi was named for Friedrich Wilhelm Alexander von Mechow.

== Bibliography ==
- Carcasson, R.H. 1960 "The Swallowtail Butterflies of East Africa (Lepidoptera, Papilionidae)". Journal of the East Africa Natural History Society pdf Key to East Africa members of the species group, diagnostic and other notes and figures. (Permission to host granted by The East Africa Natural History Society
