= Papilio nobicea =

Volta swallowtail

Scientific classification
- Kingdom: Animalia
- Phylum: Arthropoda
- Clade: Pancrustacea
- Class: Insecta
- Order: Lepidoptera
- Family: Papilionidae
- Genus: Papilio
- Species: P. nobicea

Binomial name
- Papilio nobicea Suffert, 1904

Synonyms
- Papilio zenobia nobicea Suffert, 1904; Papilio maesseni Berger, 1974

Species of butterfly

Papilio nobicea, the Volta swallowtail, is a butterfly in the family Papilionidae. It is found in Ghana and Togo. The habitat consists of forests in mountainous terrain.

== Taxonomy ==
It is a member of the zenobia species group. In the zenobia group the basic upperside wing pattern is black with white or yellowish bands and spots. The underside is brown and basally there is a red area marked with black stripes and spots. In the discal area there is a yellowish band with black stripes and veins. Females resemble butterflies of the genus Amauris. Both sexes lack tails.

The clade members are:

- Papilio cyproeofila Butler, 1868
- Papilio fernandus Fruhstorfer, 1903
- Papilio filaprae Suffert, 1904
- Papilio gallienus Distant, 1879
- Papilio mechowi Dewitz, 1881
- Papilio mechowianus Dewitz, 1885
- Papilio nobicea Suffert, 1904
- Papilio zenobia Fabricius, 1775

Torben Larsen developed a species numbering system for his 2005 publication Butterflies of West Africa. This species is #17. The 'Larsen' numbers have since been used with permission in A Sharp Eye on Butterflies of Ghana.

== Description ==
Papilio nobicea is very similar to Papilio zenobia but has pure white discal bands with no cream tinge. (Larsen, 2005). In the Global Butterfly Information System nobicea Suffert, 1904 is treated as a junior synonym of Papilio (Druryia) zenobia Fabricius, 1775.

== See also ==
- Volta River – River in West Africa
