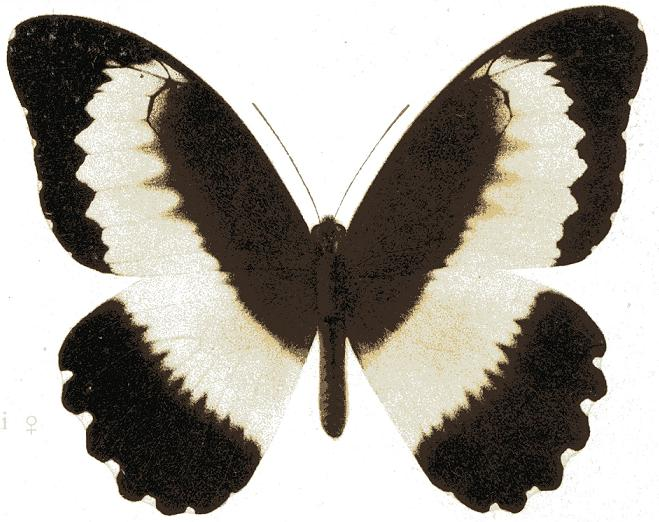

Scientific classification
- Kingdom: Animalia
- Phylum: Arthropoda
- Clade: Pancrustacea
- Class: Insecta
- Order: Lepidoptera
- Family: Papilionidae
- Genus: Papilio
- Species: P. mechowianus

Binomial name
- Papilio mechowianus Dewitz, 1885

Synonyms
- Papilio cypraeafila var. mechowianus Dewitz, 1885; Papilio andoclides Grose-Smith, 1900; Papilio mechowianus ab. lagai Dufrane, 1936

= Papilio mechowianus =

Species of butterfly

Papilio mechowianus is a species of swallowtail butterfly from the genus Papilio that is found in Angola and the Republic of the Congo.

== Taxonomy ==
It is a member of the zenobia species group. In the zenobia group the basic upperside wing pattern is black with white or yellowish bands and spots. The underside is brown and basally there is a red area marked with black stripes and spots. In the discal area there is a yellowish band with black stripes and veins. Females resemble butterflies from the genus Amauris. Both sexes lack tails.External images

The clade members are:

- Papilio cyproeofila Butler, 1868
- Papilio fernandus Fruhstorfer, 1903
- Papilio filaprae Suffert, 1904
- Papilio gallienus Distant, 1879
- Papilio mechowi Dewitz, 1881
- Papilio mechowianus Dewitz, 1885
- Papilio nobicea Suffert, 1904
- Papilio zenobia Fabricius, 1775

== Description ==
It is very similar to Papilio cyproeofila. It differs from P. mechowi in having the white band broad. See original description.
