= Papilio fernandus =

Scientific classification
- Kingdom: Animalia
- Phylum: Arthropoda
- Clade: Pancrustacea
- Class: Insecta
- Order: Lepidoptera
- Family: Papilionidae
- Genus: Papilio
- Species: P. fernandus

Binomial name
- Papilio fernandus Fruhstorfer, 1903

Synonyms
- Papilio cypraeafila fernandus Fruhstorfer, 1903; Papilio cyproeofila fernandus f. fumigatus Canu, 1994

Species of butterfly

Papilio fernandus is a species of swallowtail butterfly from the genus Papilio that is found in Equatorial Guinea.

== Taxonomy ==
It is a member of the zenobia species group. In the zenobia group the basic upperside wing pattern is black with white or yellowish bands and spots. The underside is brown and basally there is a red area marked with black stripes and spots. In the discal area there is a yellowish band with black stripes and veins. Females resemble Amauris butterflies. Both sexes lack tails. The clade members are:

- Papilio cyproeofila Butler, 1868
- Papilio fernandus Fruhstorfer, 1903
- Papilio filaprae Suffert, 1904
- Papilio gallienus Distant, 1879
- Papilio mechowi Dewitz, 1881
- Papilio mechowianus Dewitz, 1885
- Papilio nobicea Suffert, 1904
- Papilio zenobia Fabricius, 1775

== Description ==
It is very similar to Papilio cyproeofila and the very short description of P. fernandus places it as a local race of P. cyproeofila.

== Gallery ==
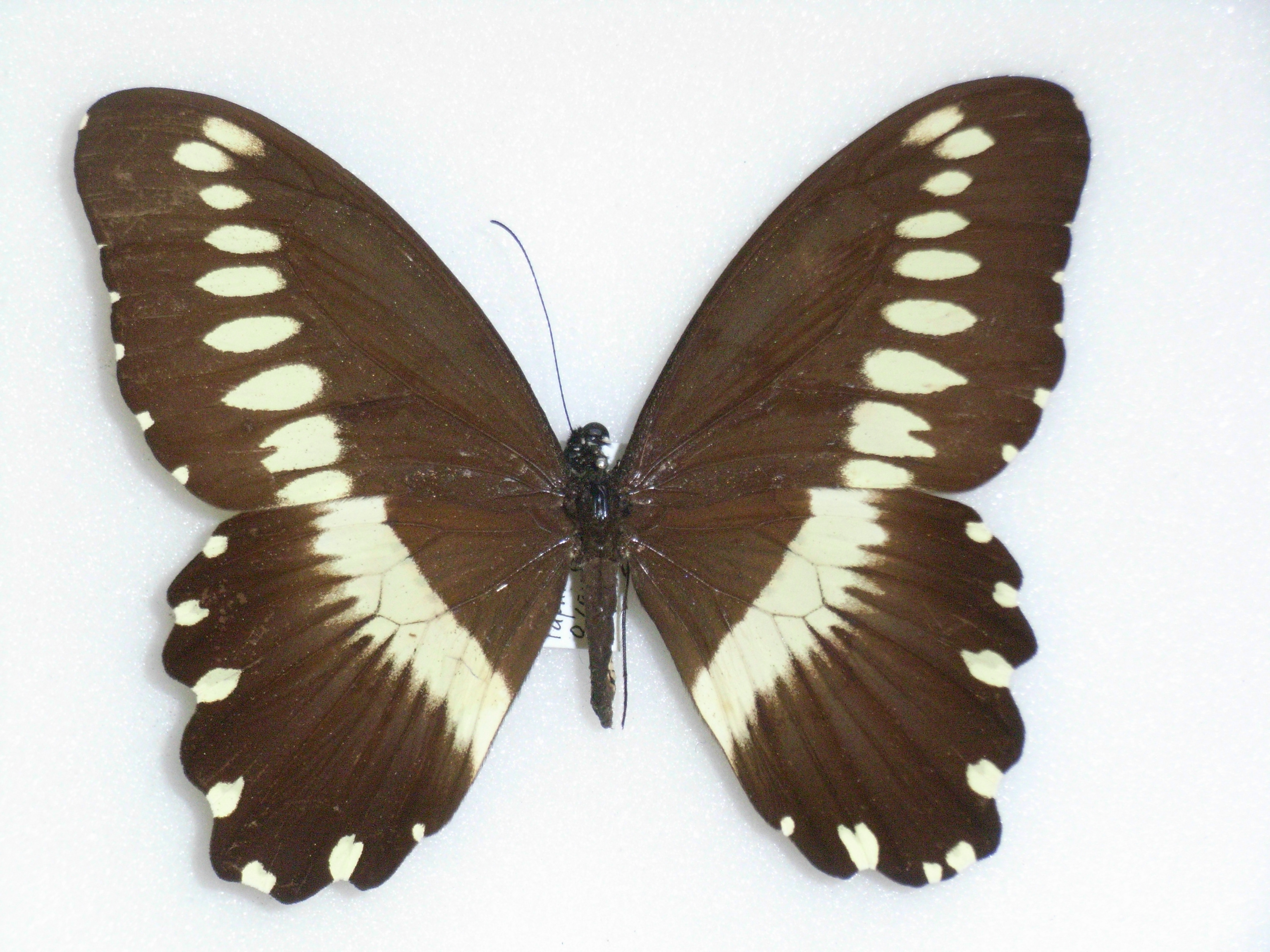
Papilio gallienus

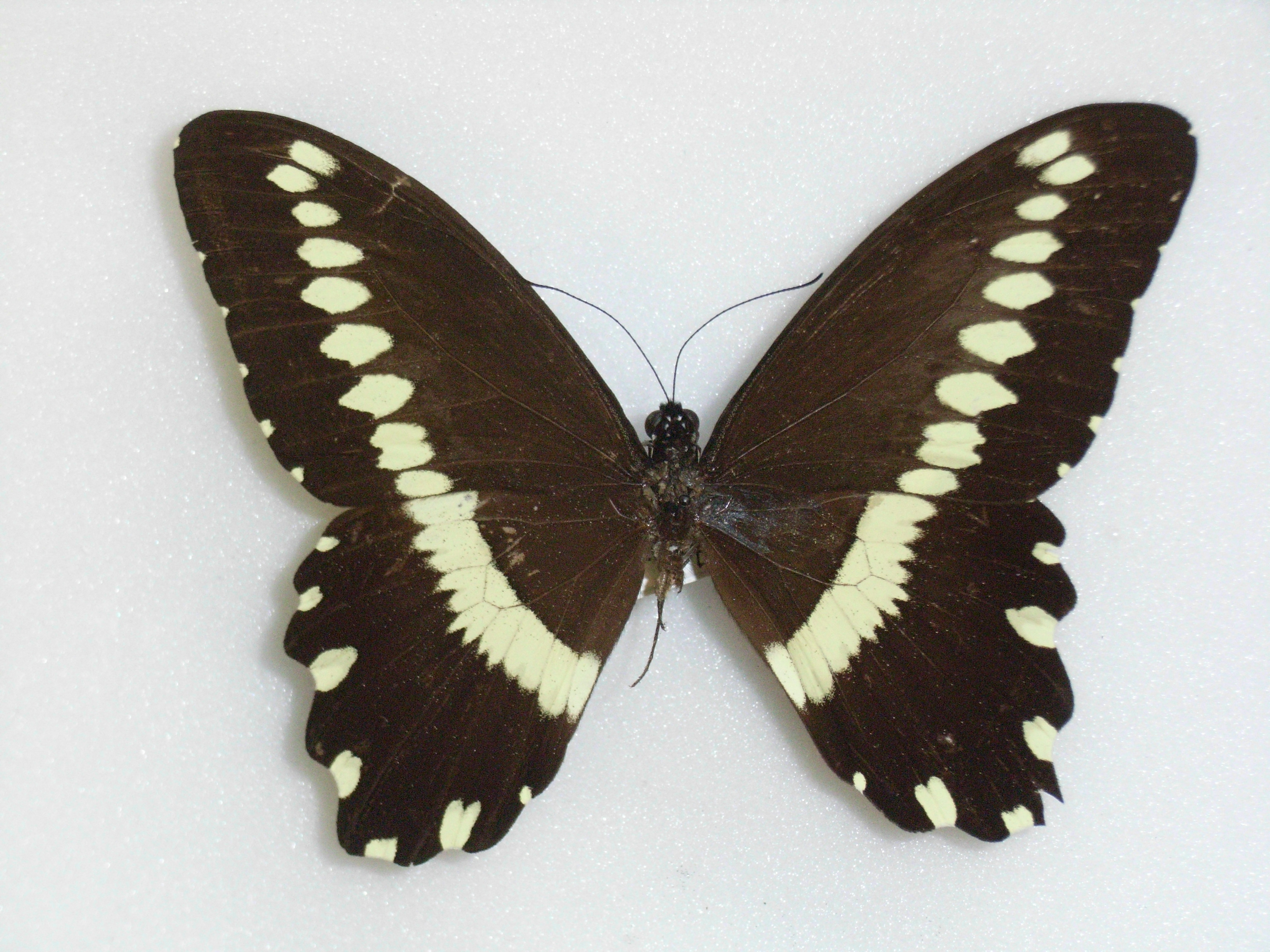
Papilio mechowi

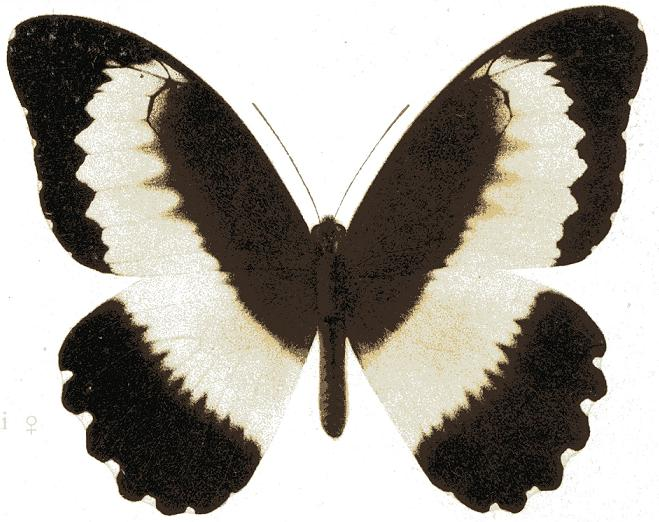
Papilio mechowianus

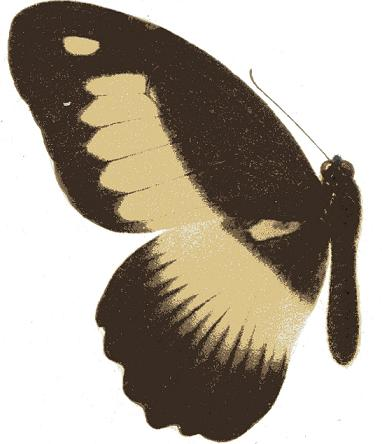
Papilio zenobia

== Bibliography ==
- Fruhstorfer, 1903 Papilio cypraeafila [sic] fernandus nov. subspec Fruhstorfer, 1903 Stettin ent. Ztg 64 (2) : 360
