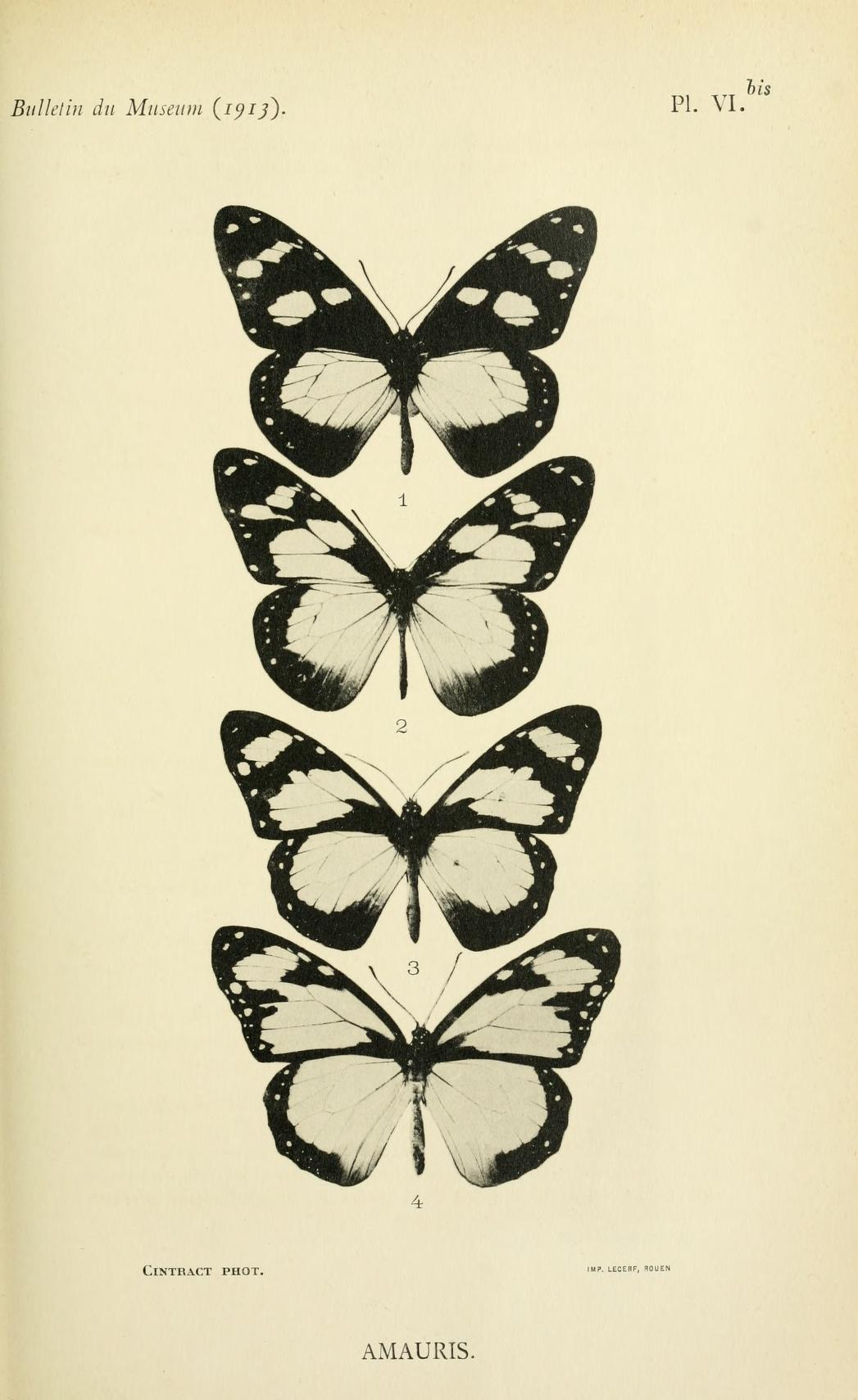
- Figure 2

Scientific classification
- Kingdom: Animalia
- Phylum: Arthropoda
- Clade: Pancrustacea
- Class: Insecta
- Order: Lepidoptera
- Family: Nymphalidae
- Genus: Amauris
- Species: A. tartarea

Binomial name
- Amauris tartarea Mabille, 1876

Synonyms
- Amauris egialea var. tartarea Mabille, 1876; Amauris (Amauris) tartarea; Amauris psyttalea Plötz, 1880; Amauris damocles var. gabunica Aurivillius, 1881; Amauris bulbifera Grose-Smith, 1887; Amauris damocles var. albidior Staudinger, 1896; Amauris mozarti Suffert, 1904; Amauris tartarea reata Suffert, 1904; Amauris psyttalea ab. intermedia Grünberg, 1911; Amauris damocles ab. bibundana Strand, 1913; Amauris damocles ab. tartaroides Strand, 1913; Amauris damocles ab. bassana Strand, 1913; Amauris damocles ab. psyttaloides Strand, 1913; Amauris psyttalea vansomereni Bryk, 1937; Amauris psyttalea vansomereni ab. lagai Dufrane, 1948; Amauris tartarea f. palisotea Stoneham, 1958; Amauris tartarea f. steropes Stoneham, 1958; Amauris damocles var. damoclides Staudinger, 1896; Amauris lecerfi Boullet, 1913; Amauris damocles damoclides ab. amplificata Joicey and Talbot, 1925

= Amauris tartarea =

Species of butterfly

Amauris tartarea, the monk or dusky friar, is a butterfly in the family Nymphalidae. It is found in Guinea, Burkina Faso, Sierra Leone, Liberia, Ivory Coast, Ghana, Togo, Benin, Nigeria, Cameroon, Equatorial Guinea, Gabon, the Republic of the Congo, the Central African Republic, Angola, the Democratic Republic of the Congo, Sudan, Uganda, Kenya, Tanzania, Malawi, Zambia, Botswana and Namibia. The habitat consists of various types of forests.

Adult males mud-puddle and imbibe pyrrolizidine alkaloids from Heliotropium species, especially from the roots of dug-up plants. Both sexes are attracted to flowers. The species is mimicked by Hypolimnas anthedon.

The larvae feed on Asclepiadaceae and Brassica species.

== Subspecies ==
- Amauris tartarea tartarea (Guinea, Burkina Faso, Sierra Leone, Liberia, Ivory Coast, Ghana, Togo, Benin, Nigeria, Cameroon, Equatorial Guinea: Mbini, Gabon, Congo, Central African Republic, Angola, Democratic Republic of the Congo, southern Sudan, Uganda, western Kenya, western Tanzania, Zambia, north-eastern Botswana, Namibia)
- Amauris tartarea damoclides Staudinger, 1896 (south-eastern Kenya, eastern and northern Tanzania, Malawi, north-eastern Zambia)
- Amauris tartarea tukuyuensis Kielland, 1990 (south-western Tanzania)

Torben Larsen developed a species numbering system for his 2005 publication Butterflies of West Africa. The nominate subspecies is #651. The 'Larsen' numbers have since been used with permission in A Sharp Eye on Butterflies of Ghana.
