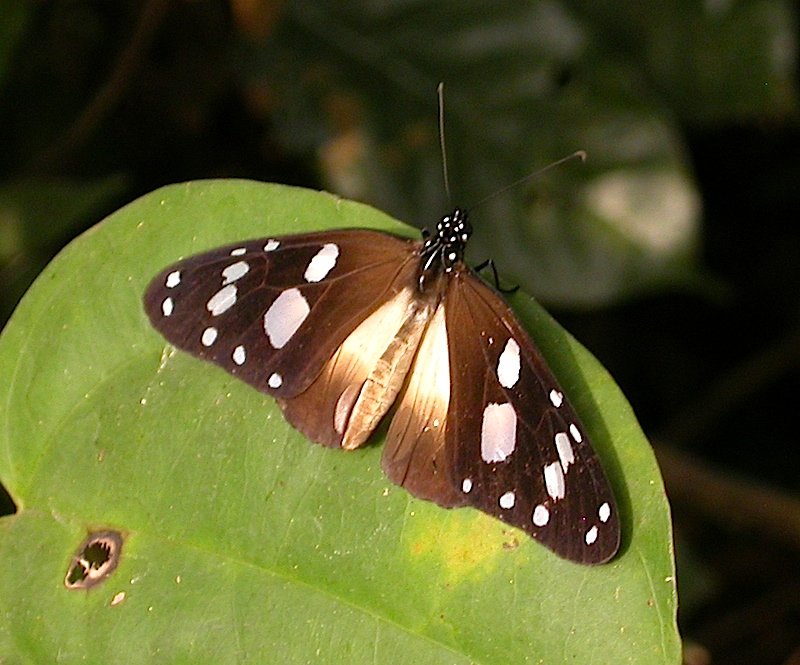

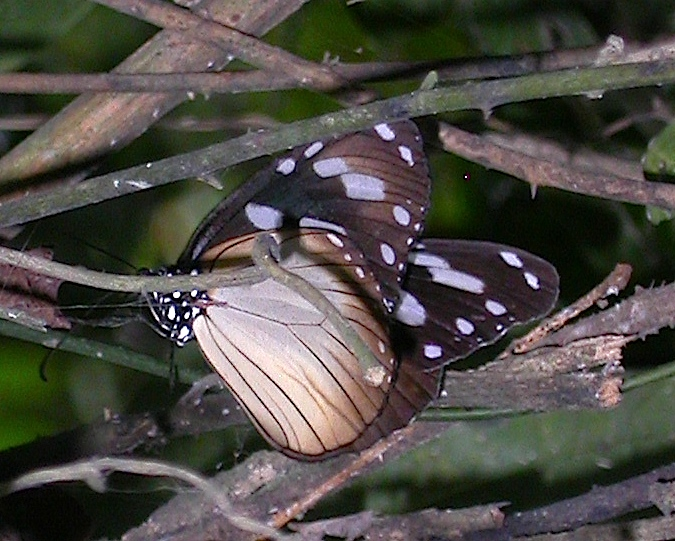

Scientific classification
- Kingdom: Animalia
- Phylum: Arthropoda
- Clade: Pancrustacea
- Class: Insecta
- Order: Lepidoptera
- Family: Nymphalidae
- Genus: Amauris
- Species: A. damocles

Binomial name
- Amauris damocles (Fabricius, 1793)

Synonyms
- Papilio damocles Fabricius, 1793; Amauris (Amaura) damocles; Papilio egialea Cramer, 1777; Amauris hyalites r. punctata Dufrane, 1948; Amauris egialia makuyensis Carcasson, 1964

= Amauris damocles =

Small monk

Species of butterfly

Amauris damocles, the small monk, is a butterfly in the family Nymphalidae. It is found in Senegal, Gambia, Guinea, Burkina Faso, Sierra Leone, Liberia, Ivory Coast, Ghana, Togo, Benin, Nigeria, Cameroon and Tanzania. The habitat consists of dry forests, Guinea savanna and disturbed areas in the rainforest zone.

This species is mimicked by one of the forms of Hypolimnas anthedon.

The larvae probably feed on Pergularia species.

== Subspecies ==
- Amauris damocles damocles (Senegal, Gambia, Guinea, Burkina Faso, Sierra Leone, Liberia, Ivory Coast, Ghana, Togo, Benin, Nigeria, western Cameroon)
- Amauris damocles makuyensis Carcasson, 1964 (western Tanzania)

Torben Larsen developed a species numbering system for his 2005 publication Butterflies of West Africa. The nominate subspecies is #653. The 'Larsen' numbers have since been used with permission in A Sharp Eye on Butterflies of Ghana.
