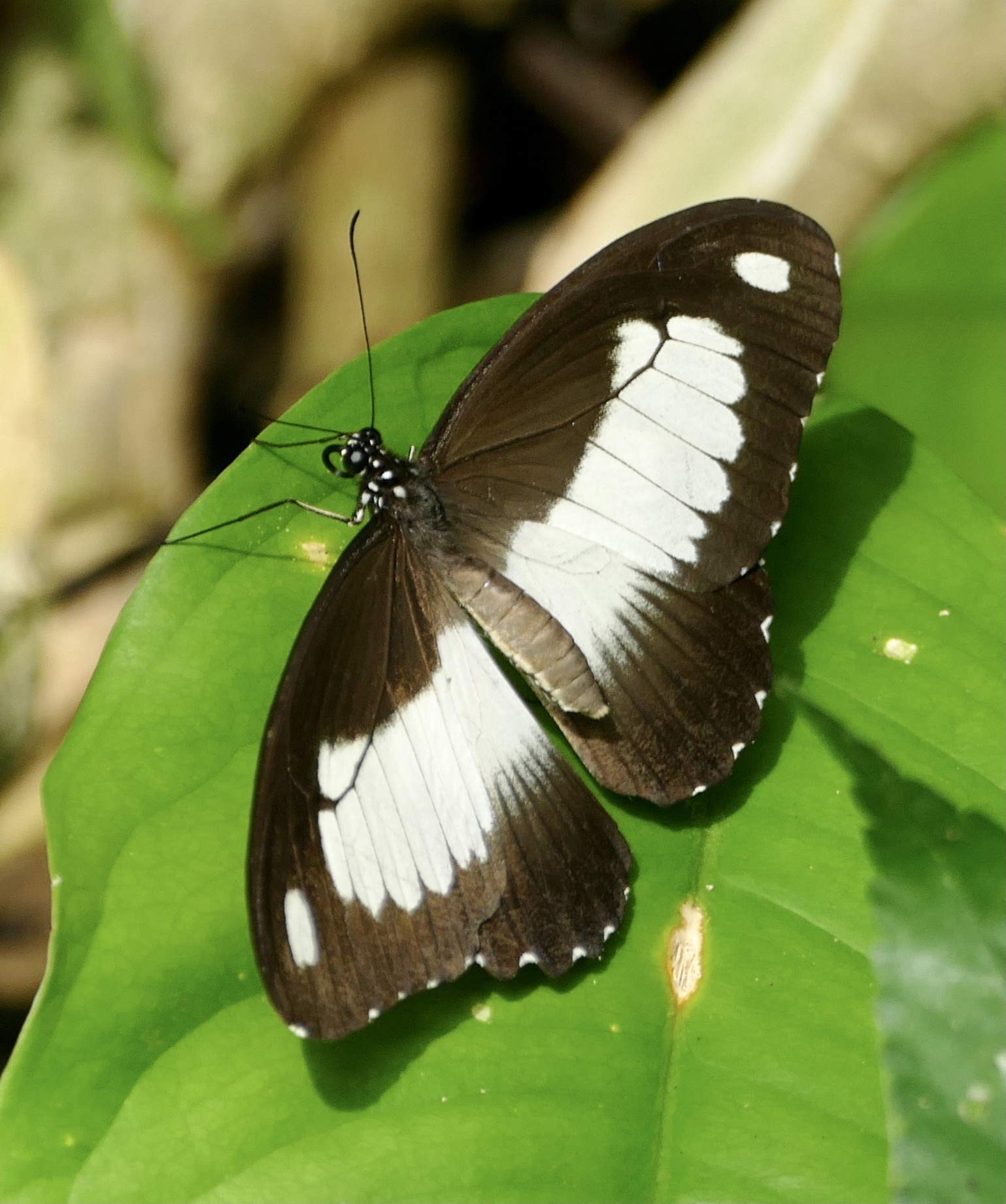

Scientific classification
- Kingdom: Animalia
- Phylum: Arthropoda
- Clade: Pancrustacea
- Class: Insecta
- Order: Lepidoptera
- Family: Papilionidae
- Genus: Papilio
- Species: P. zenobia

Binomial name
- Papilio zenobia Fabricius, 1775

Synonyms
- Papilio messalina Stoll, [1790]; Papilio odenatus Westwood, 1872; Papilio zenobia f. amygdaliferus Schultze, 1913; Papilio zenobia ab. infrapicta Strand, 1913

= Papilio zenobia =

Species of butterfly

Papilio zenobia, the Zenobia swallowtail or Volta swallowtail, is a species of swallowtail butterfly from the genus Papilio that is found in Guinea, Sierra Leone, Liberia, Ivory Coast, Ghana, Nigeria, Cameroon, Equatorial Guinea, the Republic of the Congo and Uganda. It was first described by Johan Christian Fabricius in 1775. The habitat consists of wetter forest in good to reasonable condition.

The larvae feed on Piper species, including Piper umbellatum.

== Taxonomy ==
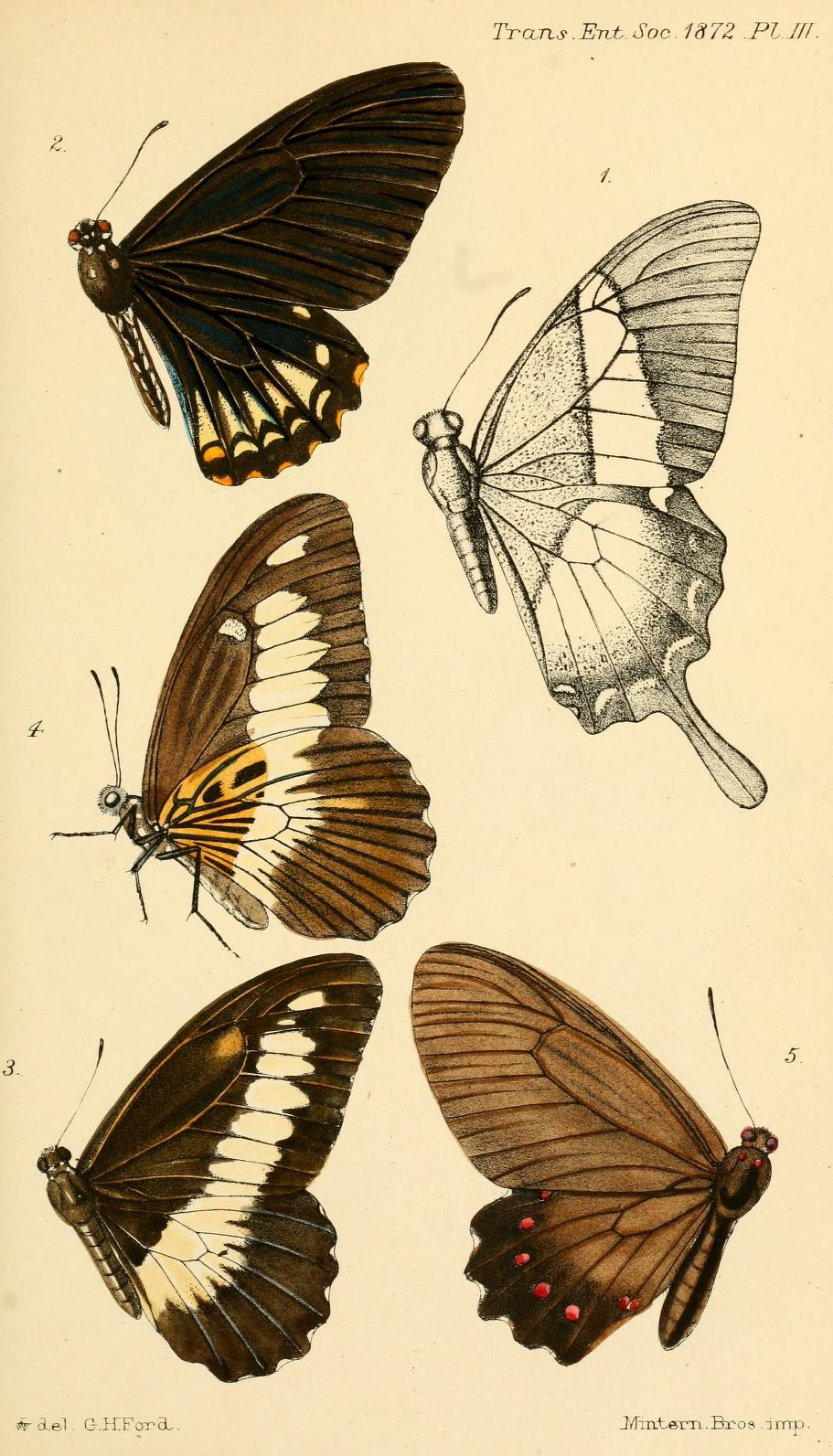
Plate from Transactions of the Entomological Society of London of 1872 showing both the upperside and underside of Papilio odenatus Westwood, 1872, figs. 3 and 4, now considered to be a junior synonym of P. zenobia

It is a member of the zenobia species group. In the zenobia group the basic upperside wing pattern is black with white or yellowish bands and spots. The underside is brown and basally there is a red area marked with black stripes and spots. In the discal area there is a yellowish band with black stripes and veins. Females resemble butterflies of the genus Amauris. Both sexes lack tails.

The clade members are:

- Papilio cyproeofila Butler, 1868
- Papilio fernandus Fruhstorfer, 1903
- Papilio filaprae Suffert, 1904
- Papilio gallienus Distant, 1879
- Papilio mechowi Dewitz, 1881
- Papilio mechowianus Dewitz, 1885
- Papilio nobicea Suffert, 1904
- Papilio zenobia Fabricius, 1775

Torben Larsen developed a species numbering system for his 2005 publication Butterflies of West Africa. This species is #16. The 'Larsen' numbers have since been used with permission in A Sharp Eye on Butterflies of Ghana.

== Diagnosis ==
It is very similar to Papilio cyproeofila but lacking white marginal spots on the hindwings. It is also close to Papilio nobicea but differs slightly in its cream bands, which are also of a different shape "Tail-less black with a very broad white median band; in the male the median band initially invades the discoidal cell of the forewing." (Robert Herbert Carcasson, 1960)
