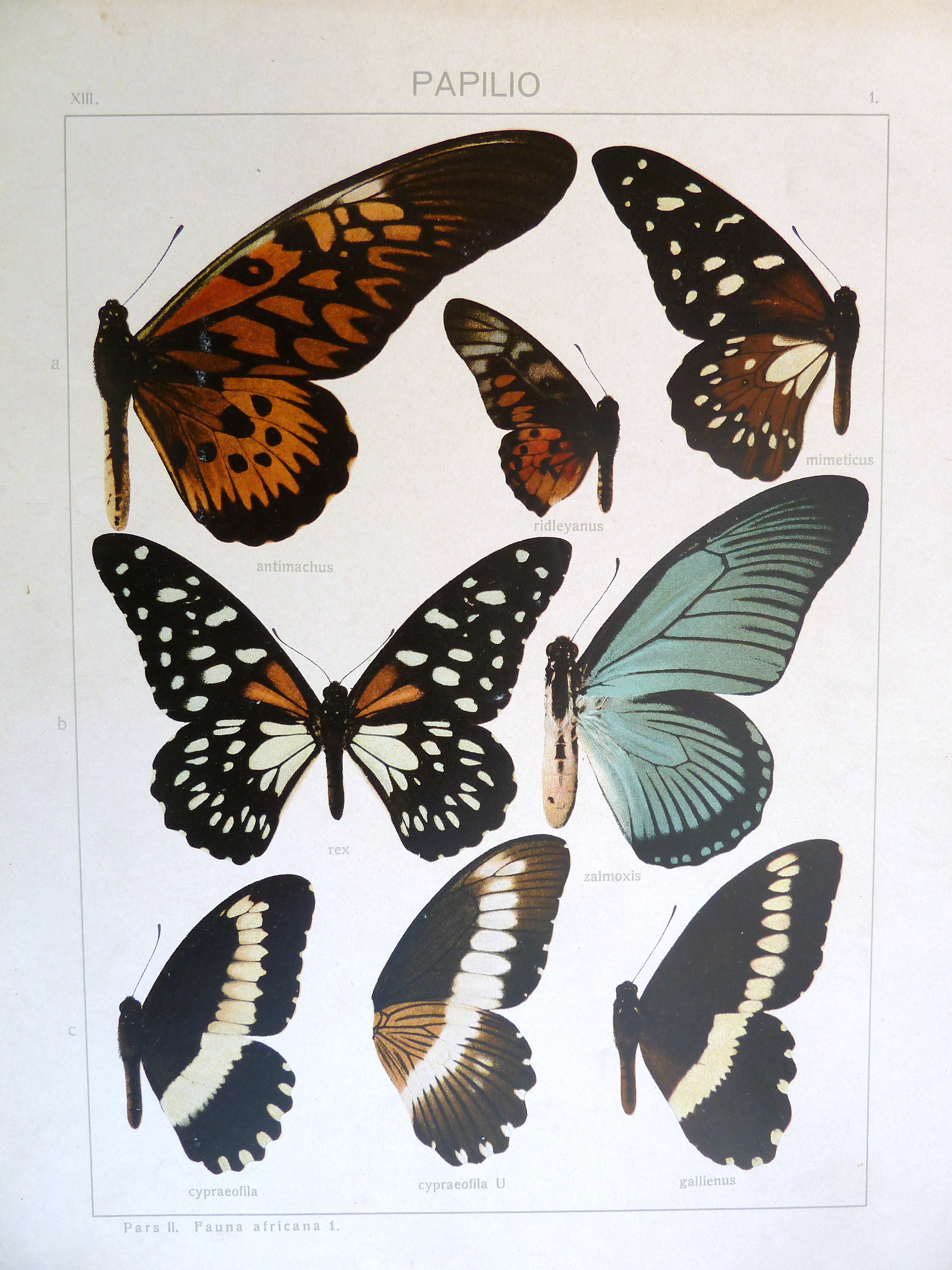
- Papilio cyproeofila in Adalbert Seitz's Fauna Africana, bottom left - upperside and next right - underside

Scientific classification
- Kingdom: Animalia
- Phylum: Arthropoda
- Clade: Pancrustacea
- Class: Insecta
- Order: Lepidoptera
- Family: Papilionidae
- Genus: Papilio
- Species: P. cyproeofila

Binomial name
- Papilio cyproeofila Butler, 1868

= Papilio cyproeofila =

Species of butterfly

Papilio cyproeofila, the common white-banded swallowtail, is a species of swallowtail butterfly from the genus Papilio that is found in Guinea, Sierra Leone, Liberia, Ivory Coast, Ghana, Togo and Nigeria.

The larvae feed on Piper species.

== Subspecies ==
- Papilio cyproeofila cyproeofila (Guinea, Sierra Leone, Liberia, Ivory Coast, Ghana, Togo, western Nigeria)
- Papilio cyproeofila praecyola Suffert, 1904 (eastern Nigeria, Cameroon, Central African Republic)

Torben Larsen developed a species numbering system for his 2005 publication Butterflies of West Africa. The nominate subspecies is #15. The 'Larsen' numbers have since been used with permission in A Sharp Eye on Butterflies of Ghana.

== Taxonomy ==
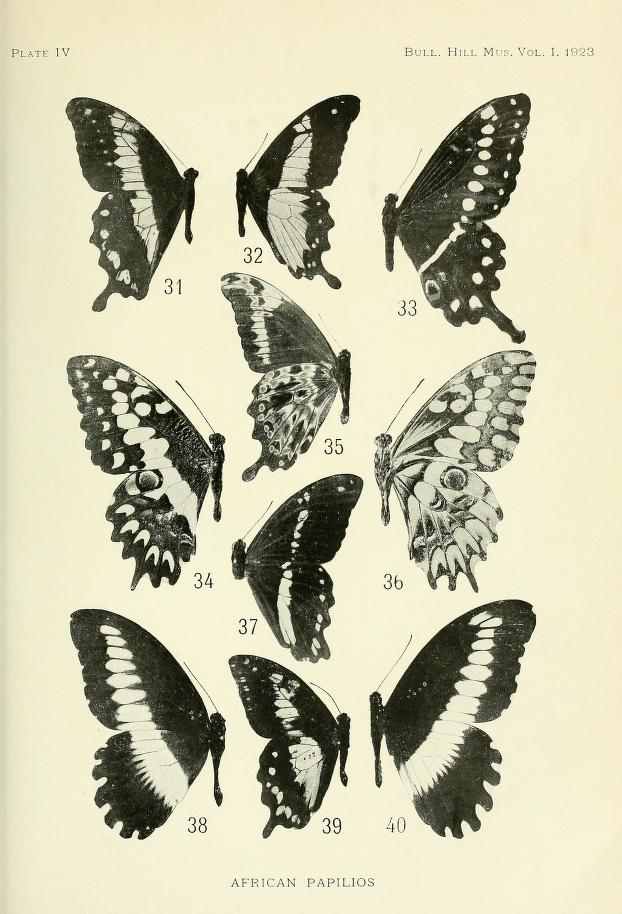
Papilio cyproeofila figs. 38 and 40 Bulletin of the Hill Museum

It is a member of the zenobia species group. In the zenobia group the basic upperside wing pattern is black with white or yellowish bands and spots. The underside is brown and basally there is a red area marked with black stripes and spots. In the discal area there is a yellowish band with black stripes and veins. Females resemble Amauris butterflies. Both sexes lack tails.

The clade members are:

- Papilio cyproeofila Butler, 1868
- Papilio fernandus Fruhstorfer, 1903
- Papilio filaprae Suffert, 1904
- Papilio gallienus Distant, 1879
- Papilio mechowi Dewitz, 1881
- Papilio mechowianus Dewitz, 1885
- Papilio nobicea Suffert, 1904
- Papilio zenobia Fabricius, 1775

== Description ==
It is very similar to Papilio gallienus but has cream-white rather than cream-yellow bands and these are not curved on the inner edge
