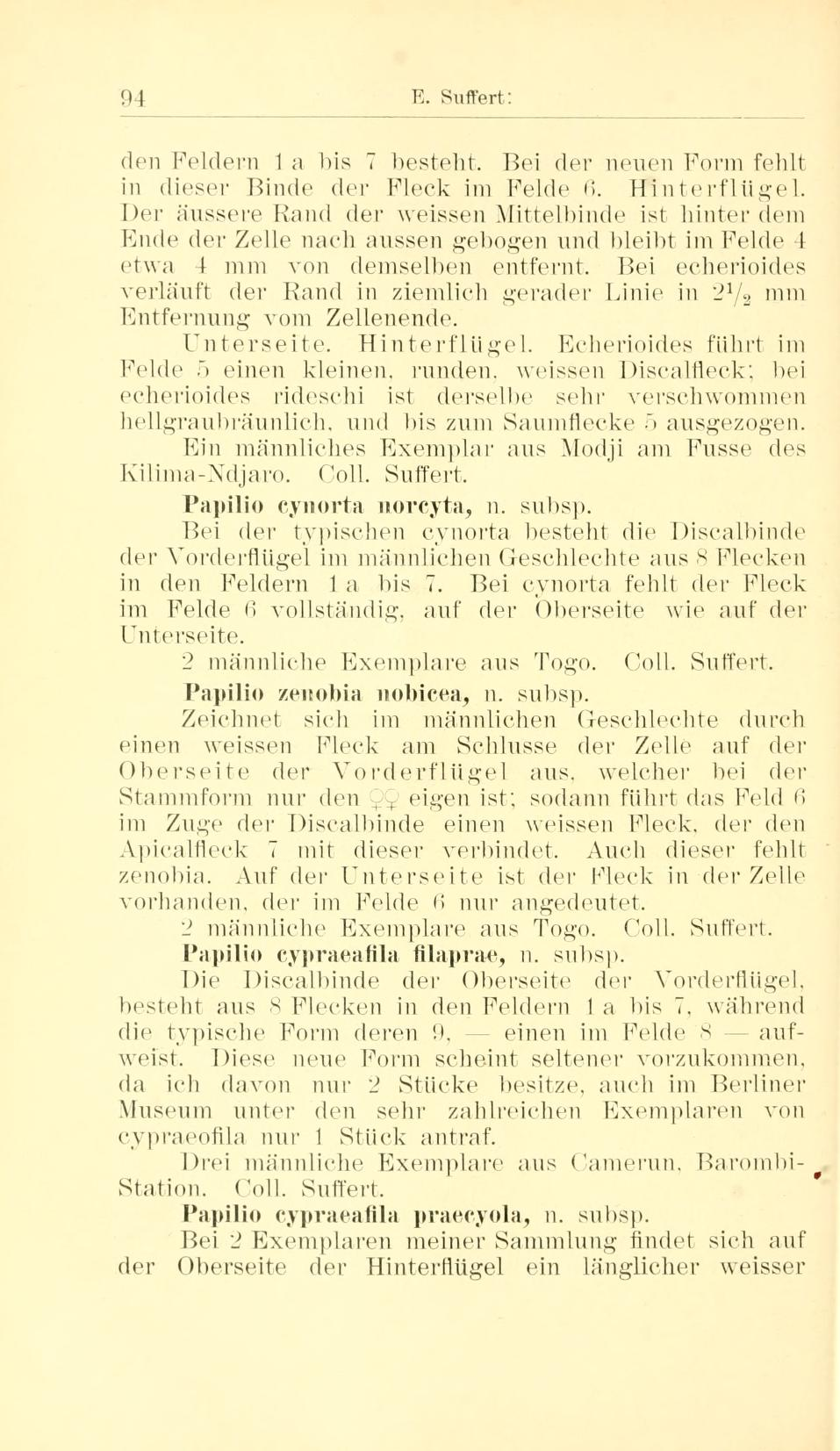
- Suffert's description

Scientific classification
- Kingdom: Animalia
- Phylum: Arthropoda
- Clade: Pancrustacea
- Class: Insecta
- Order: Lepidoptera
- Family: Papilionidae
- Genus: Papilio
- Species: P. filaprae

Binomial name
- Papilio filaprae Suffert, 1904

Synonyms
- Papilio cypraeafila filaprae Suffert, 1904; Papilio cypraeofila f. insularis Schultze, 1913; Papilio cyraeofila f. lactifascia Le Cerf, 1924

= Papilio filaprae =

Species of butterfly

Papilio filaprae is a species of swallowtail butterfly from the genus Papilio that is found in Cameroon, the Democratic Republic of the Congo, the Republic of the Congo, Angola and Equatorial Guinea. The species was first described by Ernst Suffert in 1904.

== Subspecies ==
- Papilio filaprae filaprae (south-eastern Cameroon, Congo, south-western Republic of the Congo, Angola)
- Papilio filaprae musolanus (Hancock, 1988)

== Taxonomy ==
It is a member of the zenobia species group. In the zenobia group the basic upperside wing pattern is black with white or yellowish bands and spots. The underside is brown and basally there is a red area marked with black stripes and spots. In the discal area there is a yellowish band with black stripes and veins. Females resemble Amauris butterflies. Both sexes lack tails. External images

The clade members are:

- Papilio cyproeofila Butler, 1868
- Papilio fernandus Fruhstorfer, 1903
- Papilio filaprae Suffert, 1904
- Papilio gallienus Distant, 1879
- Papilio mechowi Dewitz, 1881
- Papilio mechowianus Dewitz, 1885
- Papilio nobicea Suffert, 1904
- Papilio zenobia Fabricius, 1775

Larsen, 2005 doubts that this is a valid taxon, suggesting that it is the equatorial subspecies of Papilio cyproeofila, which it closely resembles.
