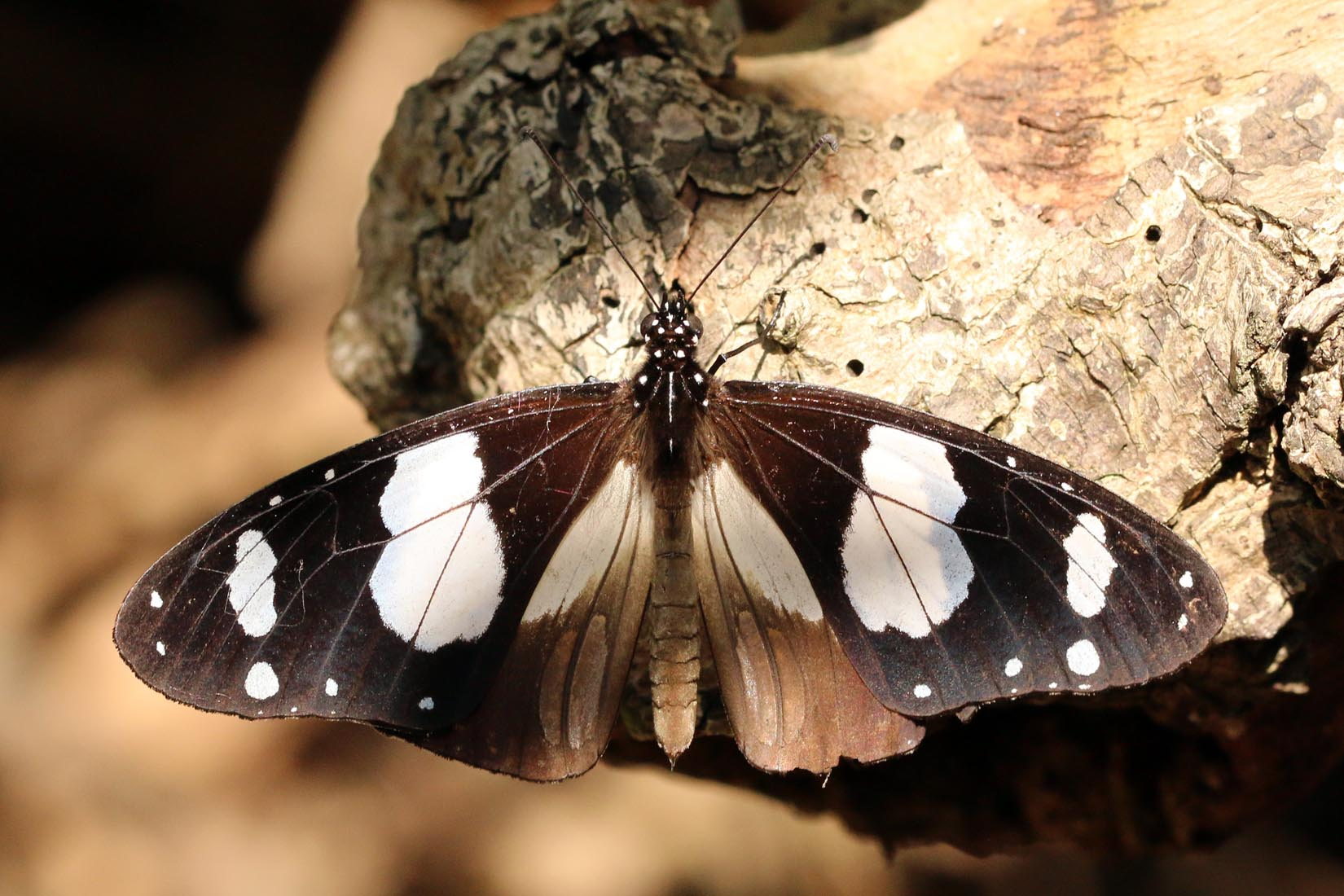
- Male, Mabibi, KwaZulu Natal, South Africa
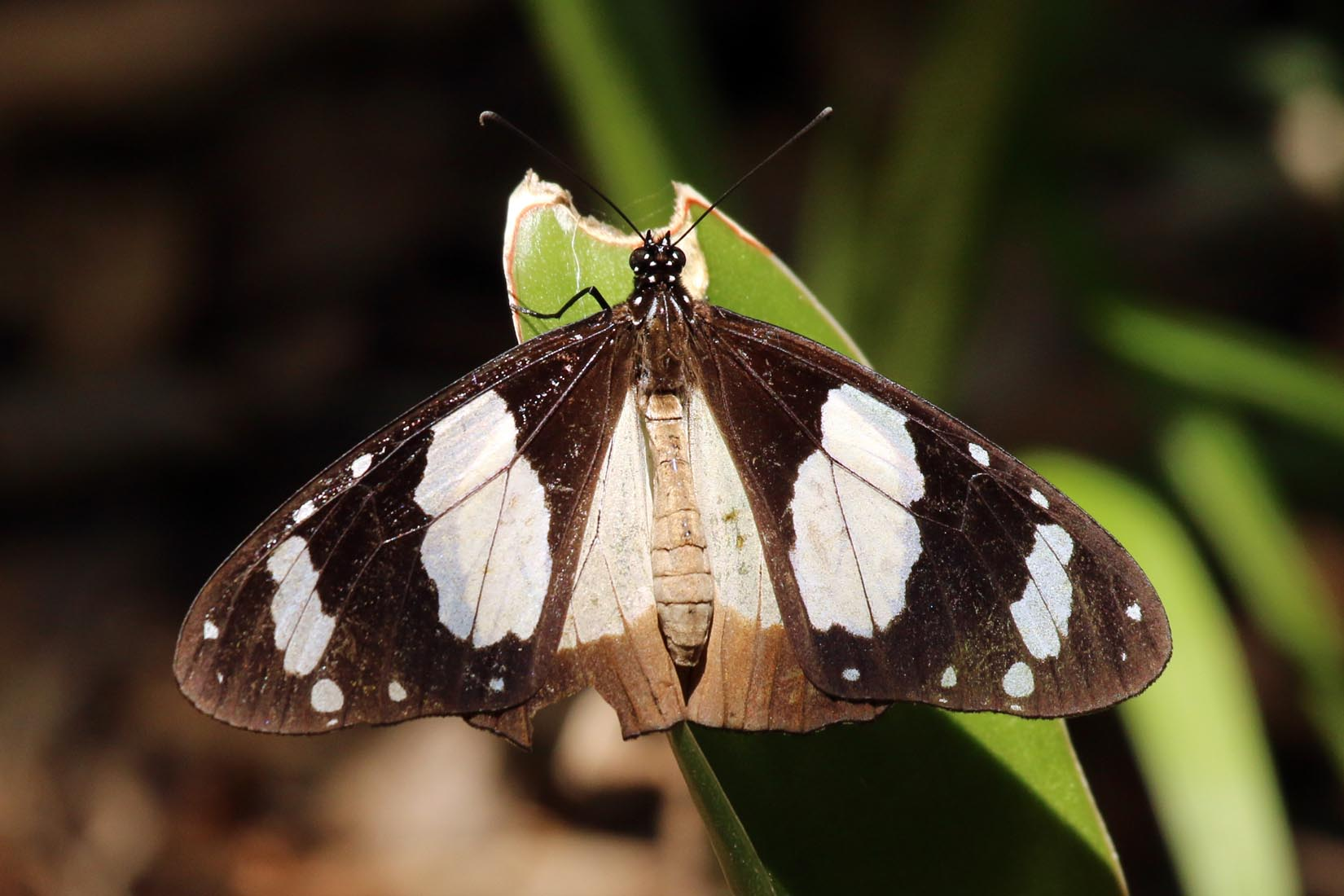
- Female

Scientific classification
- Domain: Eukaryota
- Kingdom: Animalia
- Phylum: Arthropoda
- Class: Insecta
- Order: Lepidoptera
- Family: Nymphalidae
- Genus: Amauris
- Species: A. ochlea

Binomial name
- Amauris ochlea (Boisduval, 1847)

Synonyms
- Euploea ochlea Boisduval, 1847; Amauris ochleides var. comorana Aurivillius, 1909 (not Oberthür, 1897); Amauris ochlea affinis f. spatiosa Talbot, 1940; Amauris ochlea affinis f. valens Talbot, 1940; Amauris ochlea var. affinis Aurivillius, 1911; Amauris bumilleri Lanz, 1896

= Amauris ochlea =

Novice

Species of butterfly

Amauris ochlea, the novice, is a butterfly of the family Nymphalidae. It is found in southern and south-east Africa.

The wingspan is 55–60 mm for males and 60–65 mm for females. Adults are on wing year round (with peaks in summer and autumn).

The larvae feed on Tylophora anomala, Tylophora stolzii, Gymnema, Marsdenia, Secamone, Cynanchum chirindense, Cyanchum abyssinicum, Cynanchum medium, Cynanchum nigrum, Cynanchum natalitium and Cynanchum vincetoxicum.

== Subspecies ==
- Amauris ochlea ochlea (eastern Kenya to Zululand, Natal)
- Amauris ochlea affinis Aurivillius, 1911 (Comoro Islands)
- Amauris ochlea bumilleri Lanz, 1896 (northern Malawi, south-western Tanzania, Zambia)
- Amauris ochlea darius Rothschild & Jordan, 1903 (northern Kenya (Meru, Mount Kulai) to southern Somalia and southern Ethiopia)
- Amauris ochlea moya Turlin, 1994 (Comoro Islands)
- Amauris ochlea ochleides Staudinger, 1896 (Eritrea, northern Ethiopia)

== Gallery ==
Specimens from the coastal forest at Mabibi, KwaZulu Natal, South Africa.

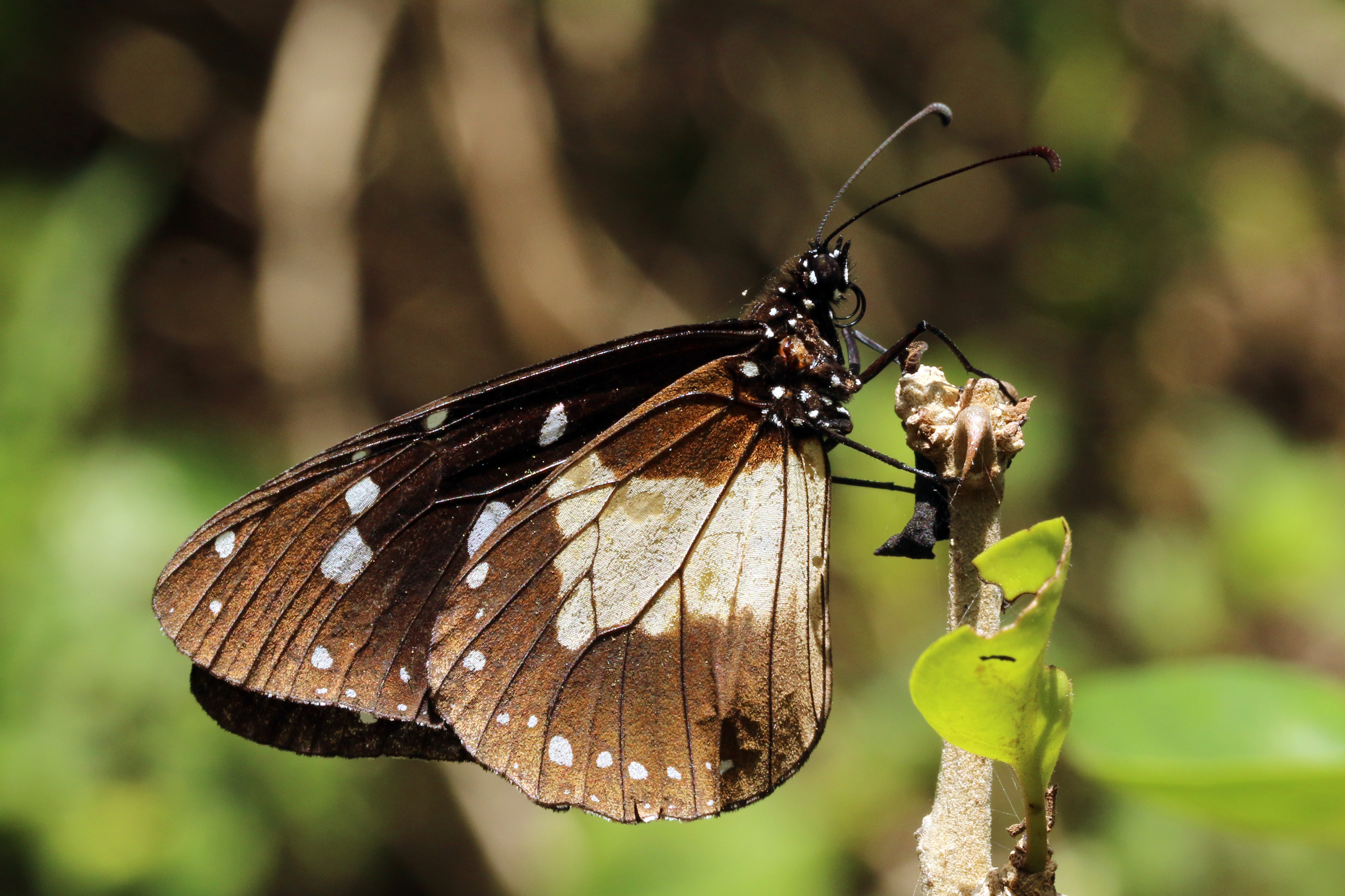
Male underside

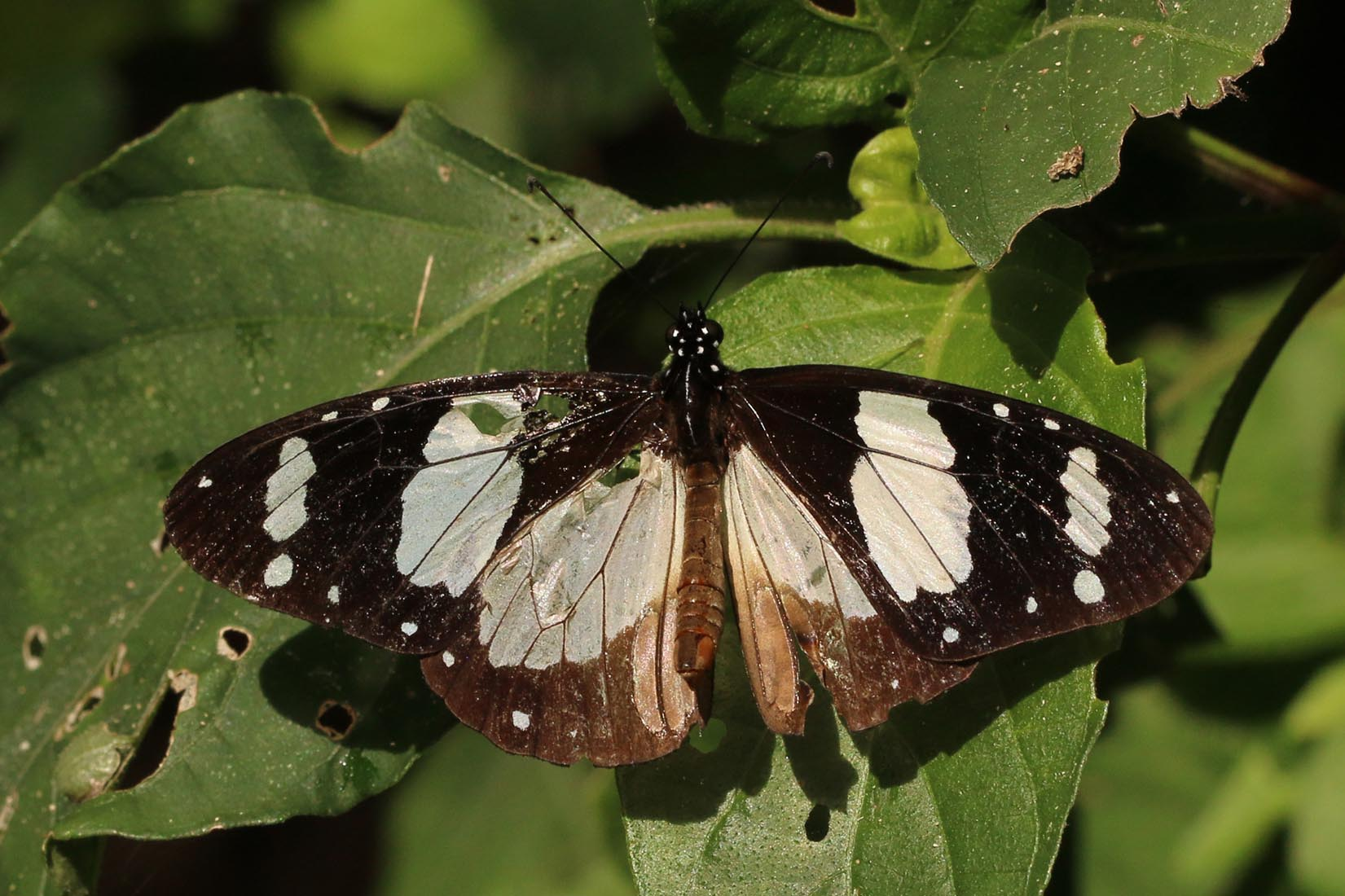
Worn male

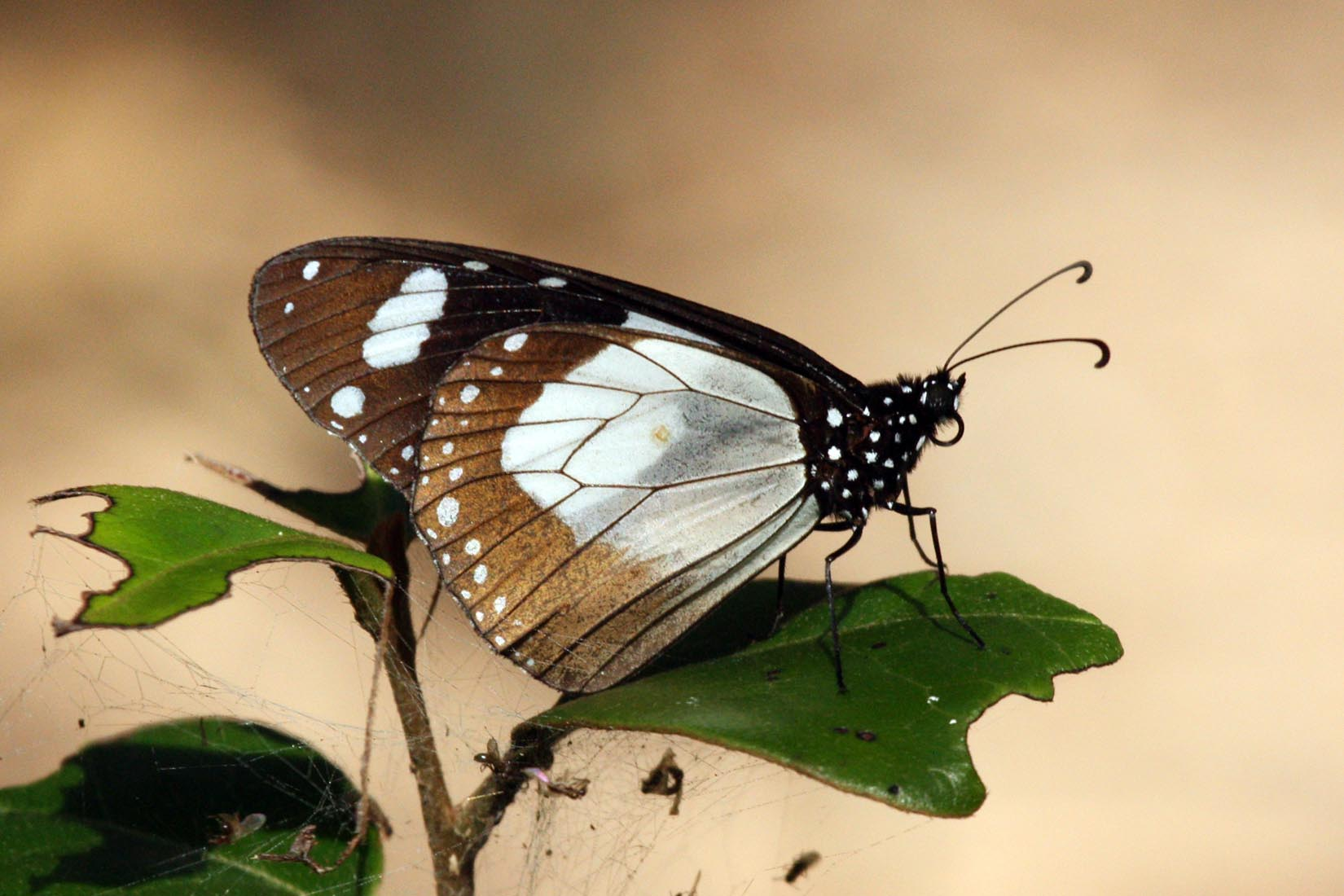
Female underside

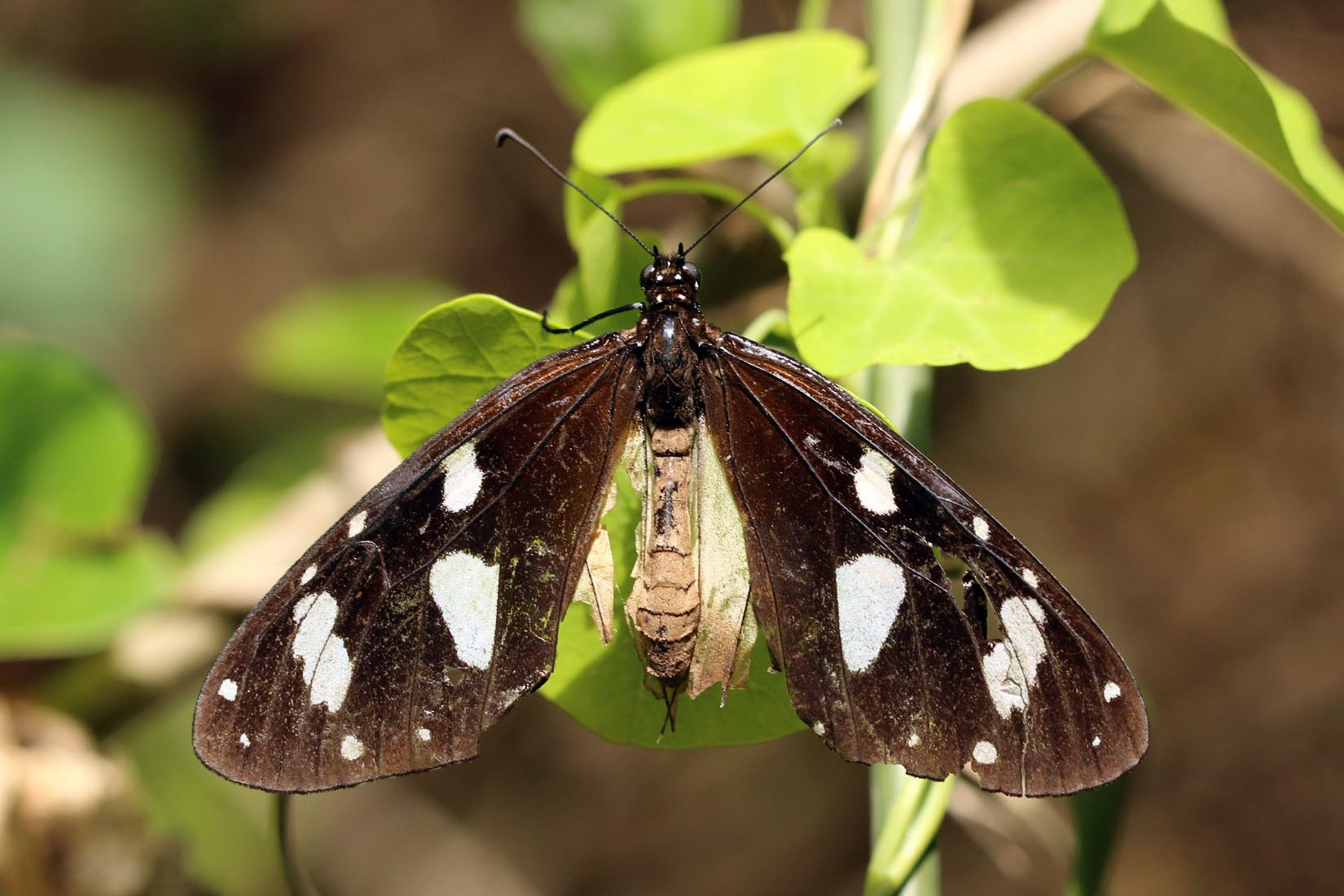
Very worn female

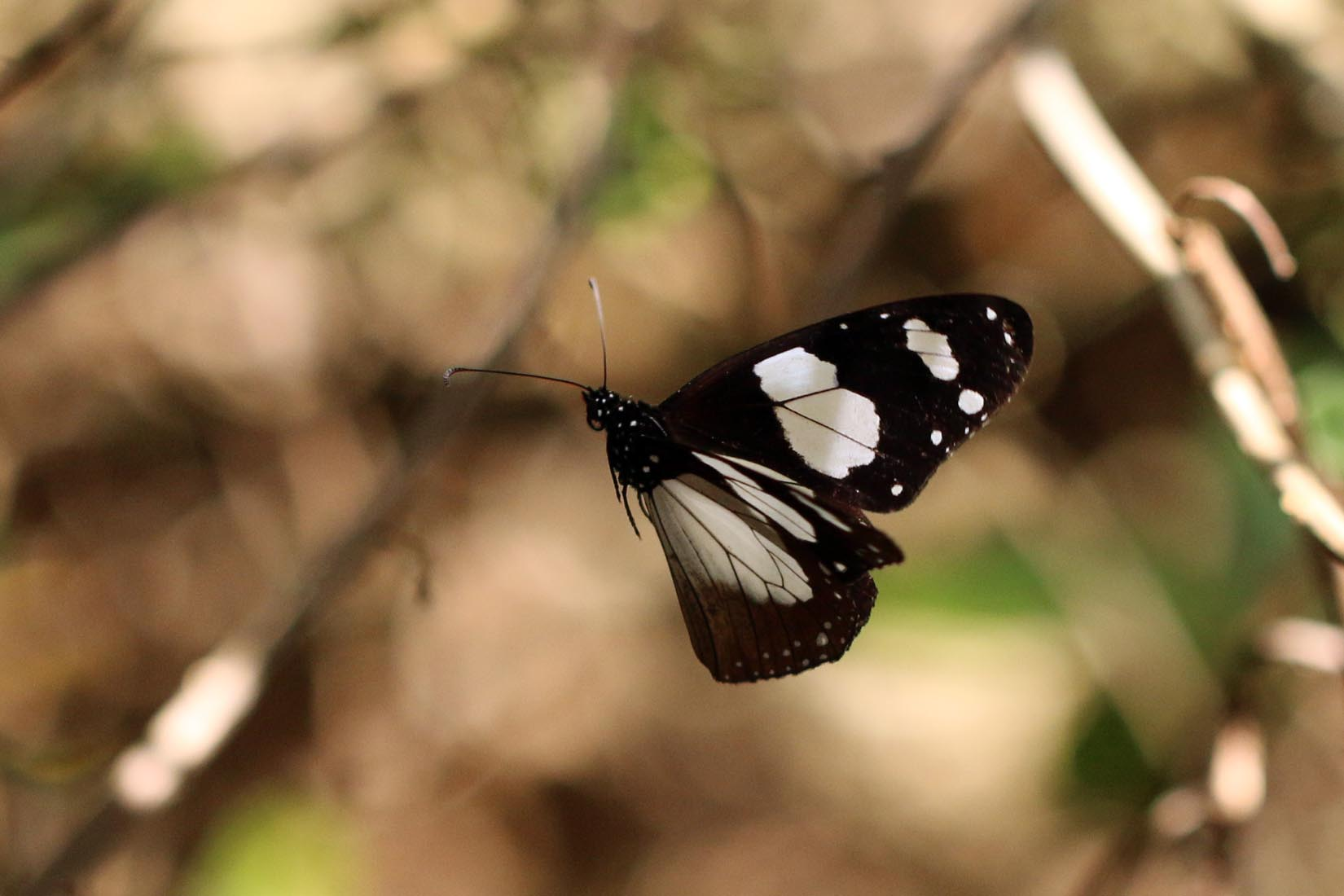
In flight
