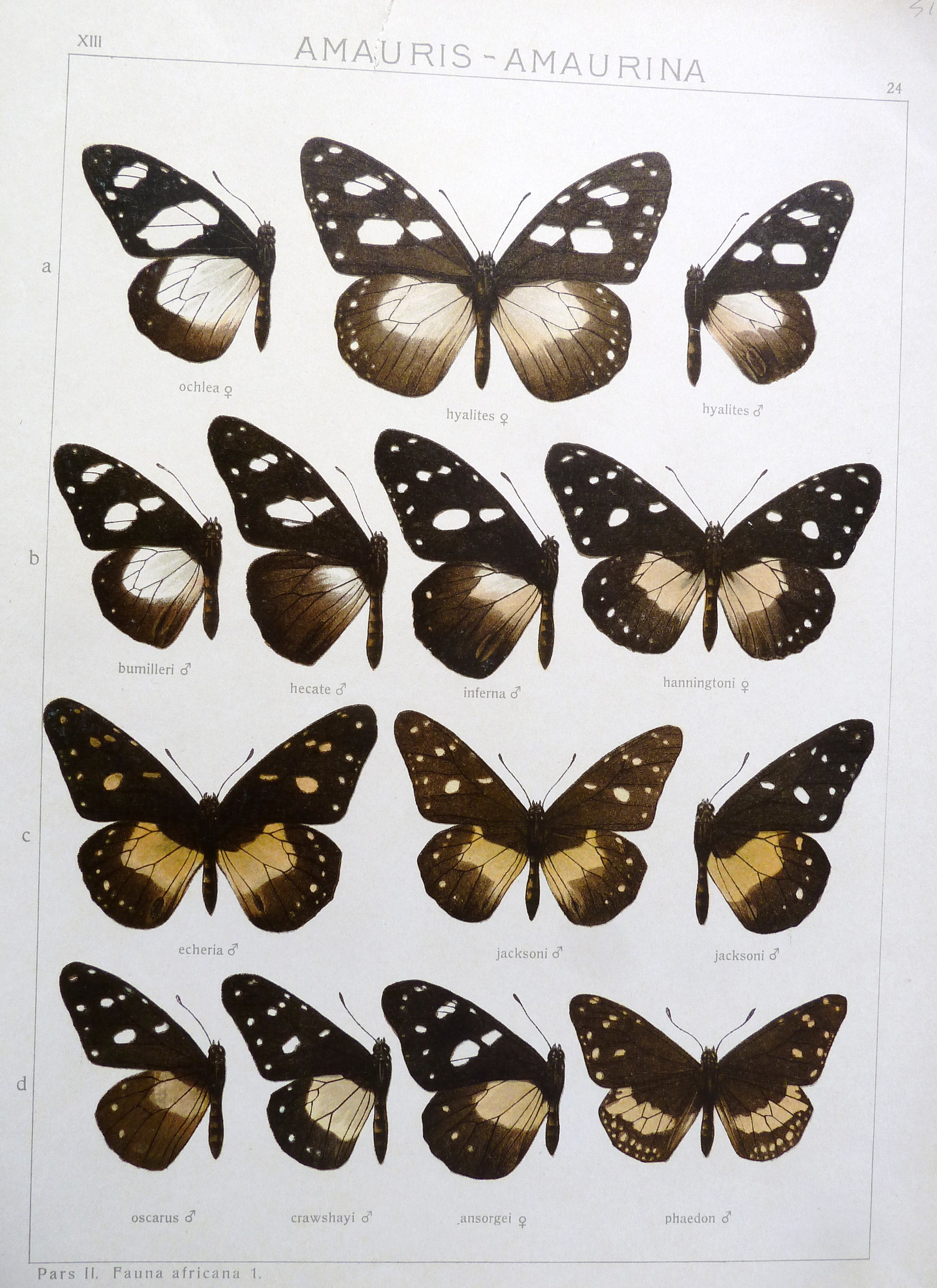
- Amauris hyalites depicted in Seitz Fauna Africana

Scientific classification
- Domain: Eukaryota
- Kingdom: Animalia
- Phylum: Arthropoda
- Class: Insecta
- Order: Lepidoptera
- Family: Nymphalidae
- Genus: Amauris
- Species: A. hyalites

Binomial name
- Amauris hyalites Butler, 1874

Synonyms
- Amauris (Amaura) hyalites; Amauris damocles hyalites; Amauris difficilis Aurivillius, 1891; Amauris fenestrata Aurivillius, 1907; Amauris schubotzi Schultze, 1914; Amauris lygia Hulstaert, 1924

= Amauris hyalites =

Species of butterfly

Amauris hyalites is a butterfly in the family Nymphalidae. It is found in southern Cameroon, Bioko, Gabon, Angola, the Democratic Republic of Congo, western Tanzania and western Zambia. The habitat consists of low to medium altitude forests.

Adult males are attracted to wet sand.

The larvae feed on Asclepiadaceae species.
