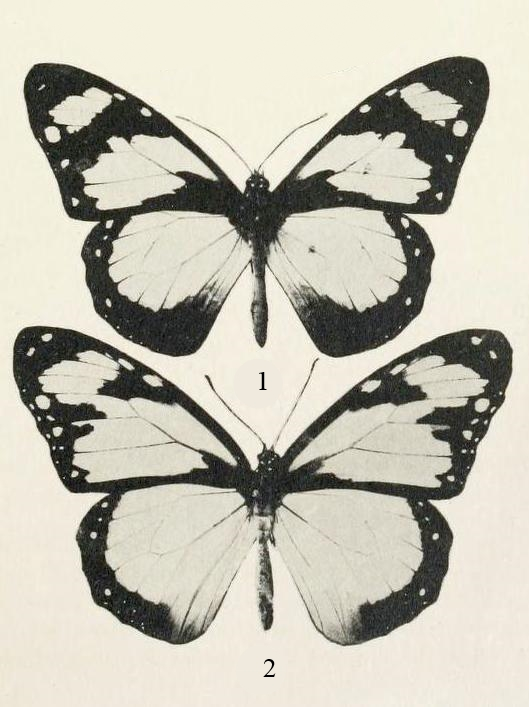
- Amauris nossima figure 1, A. n. var. conjuncta figure 2

Conservation status
- Vulnerable (IUCN 2.3)

Scientific classification
- Kingdom: Animalia
- Phylum: Arthropoda
- Clade: Pancrustacea
- Class: Insecta
- Order: Lepidoptera
- Family: Nymphalidae
- Genus: Amauris
- Species: A. nossima

Binomial name
- Amauris nossima (Ward, 1870)

Synonyms
- Danais nossima Ward, 1870; Amauris nossima var. interrupta Boullet, 1912; Amauris nossima var. conjuncta Boullet, 1913; Amauris nossima defasciata Röber, 1937; Amauris nossima f. disjuncta Talbot, 1940; Amauris nossima f. antsingyi Paulian, 1956

= Madagascan friar =

Species of butterfly

The Madagascan friar (Amauris nossima) is a species of nymphalid butterfly in the Danainae subfamily. It is found on the Comoros, Madagascar and Mayotte. The habitat consists of forests.
