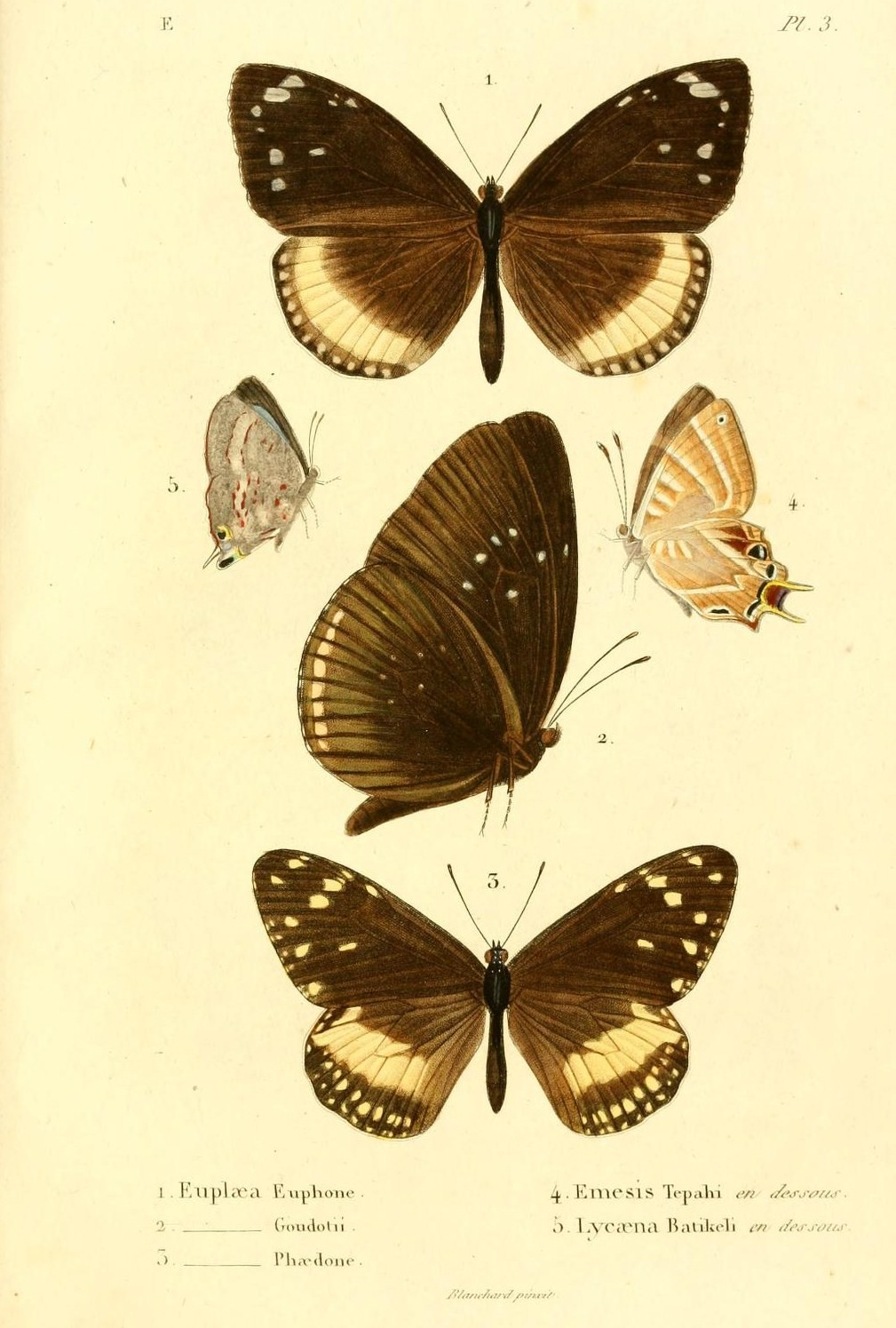
- Figure 3

Conservation status
- Vulnerable (IUCN 2.3)

Scientific classification
- Kingdom: Animalia
- Phylum: Arthropoda
- Clade: Pancrustacea
- Class: Insecta
- Order: Lepidoptera
- Family: Nymphalidae
- Genus: Amauris
- Species: A. phoedon

Binomial name
- Amauris phoedon (Fabricius, 1798)

Synonyms
- Papilio phoedon Fabricius, 1798; Danais phaedone Godart, 1819; Danais phaedon Doubleday, 1847

= Mauritian friar =

Species of butterfly

The Mauritian friar (Amauris phoedon) is a species of nymphalid butterfly in the Danainae subfamily. It is endemic to Mauritius.

The larvae feed on Tylophora asthmatica.
