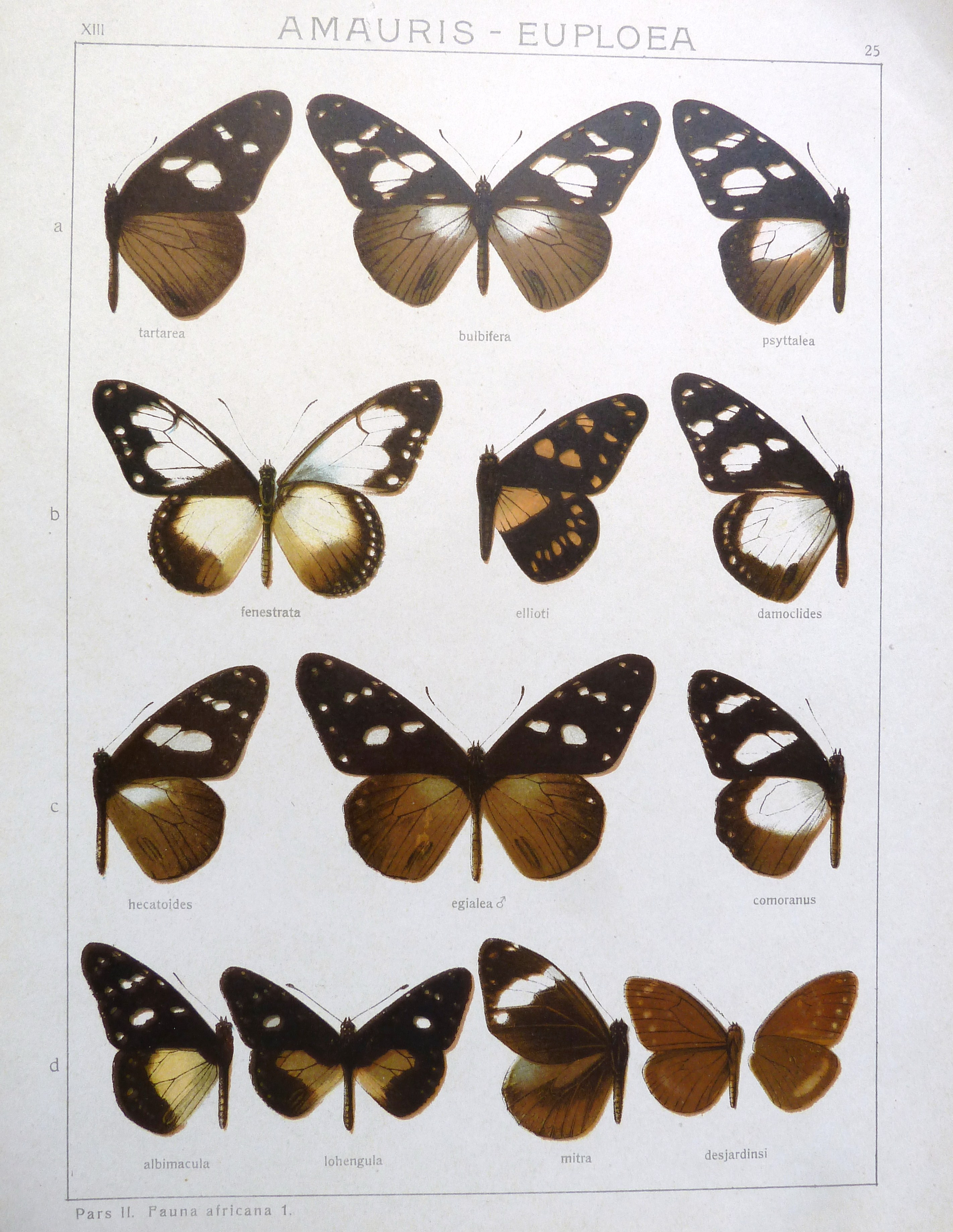
- Amauris comorana depicted in Seitz Fauna Africana

Conservation status
- Endangered (IUCN 2.3)

Scientific classification
- Kingdom: Animalia
- Phylum: Arthropoda
- Clade: Pancrustacea
- Class: Insecta
- Order: Lepidoptera
- Family: Nymphalidae
- Genus: Amauris
- Species: A. comorana

Binomial name
- Amauris comorana Oberthür, 1897

= Comoro friar =

Species of butterfly

The Comoro friar (Amauris comorana) is a species of nymphalid butterfly in the Danainae subfamily. It is endemic to the Comoros, where it is only found on the island of Grand Comore.

== Sources ==
- Lepidoptera Specialist Group (1996). "Amauris comorana". IUCN Red List of Threatened Species. 1996 e.T1001A3153377. doi:10.2305/IUCN.UK.1996.RLTS.T1001A3153377.en.
