= Amauris dannfelti =

Scientific classification
- Domain: Eukaryota
- Kingdom: Animalia
- Phylum: Arthropoda
- Class: Insecta
- Order: Lepidoptera
- Family: Nymphalidae
- Genus: Amauris
- Species: A. dannfelti

Binomial name
- Amauris dannfelti Aurivillius, 1891

Synonyms
- Amauris (Amaura) dannfelti

Species of butterfly

Amauris dannfelti is a butterfly in the family Nymphalidae. It is found in the Democratic Republic of the Congo, Angola and Zambia.

== Subspecies ==
- Amauris dannfelti dannfelti (Angola)
- Amauris dannfelti restricta Talbot, 1940 (northern Zambia, Democratic Republic of the Congo: south-east to Shaba and Maniema)
