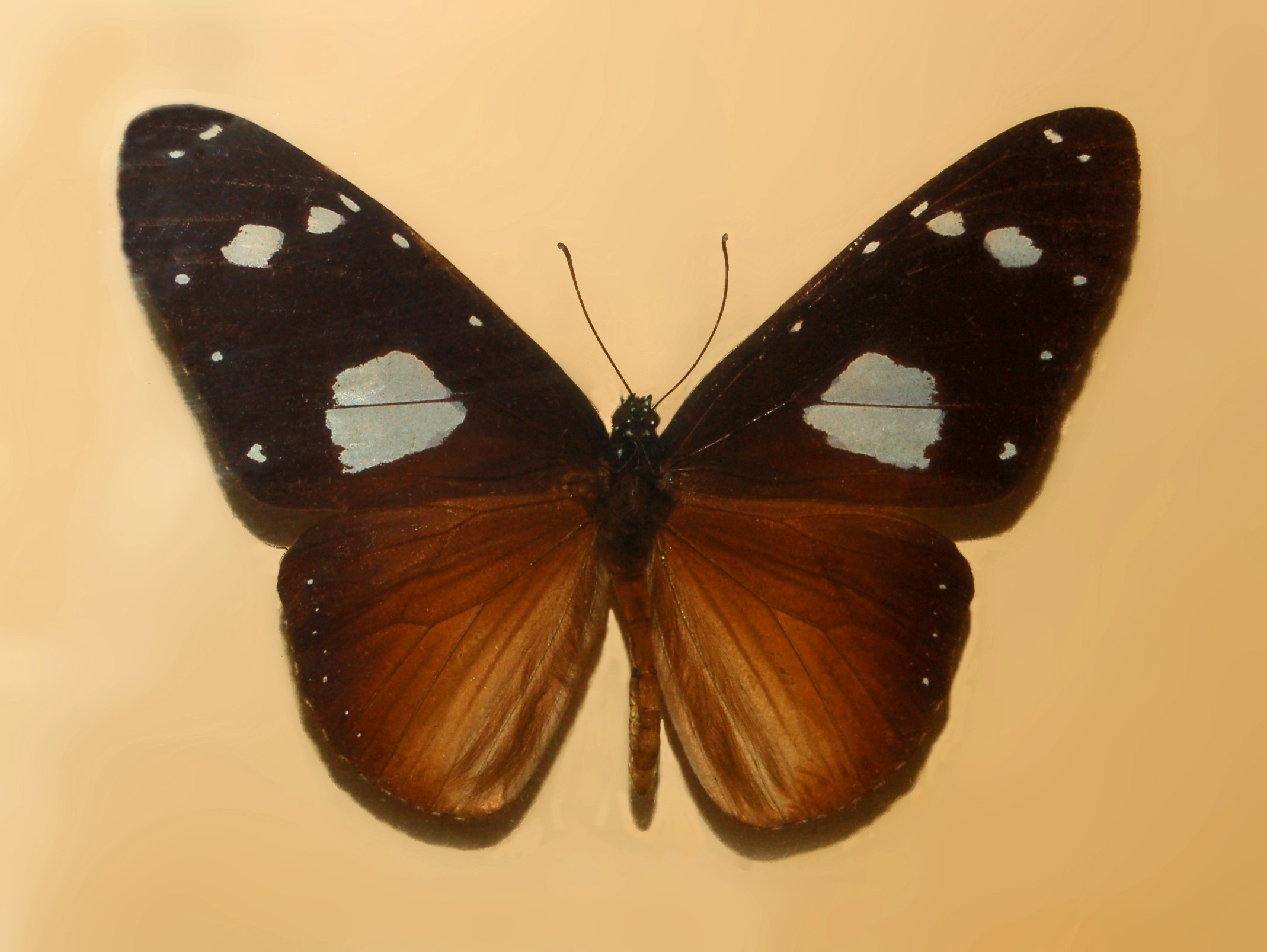
- Specimen from Uganda

Scientific classification
- Kingdom: Animalia
- Phylum: Arthropoda
- Clade: Pancrustacea
- Class: Insecta
- Order: Lepidoptera
- Family: Nymphalidae
- Genus: Amauris
- Species: A. vashti

Binomial name
- Amauris vashti (Butler, 1869)

Synonyms
- Danais vashti Butler, 1869; Amauris vashti ab. unipuncta Dufrane, 1948

= Amauris vashti =

Species of butterfly

Amauris vashti is a butterfly of the family Nymphalidae.

== Description ==
Amauris vashti has a wingspan reaching about 83 millimetres (3.3 in). The uppersides of the forewings are black, with two large basal whitish spots and a few small spots on the edge. The uppersides of the hindwings are dark brown in males and pale brown in females.

== Distribution ==
This species can be found in tropical Africa, mainly in Nigeria, Cameroun, Central African Republic and Democratic Republic of the Congo.
