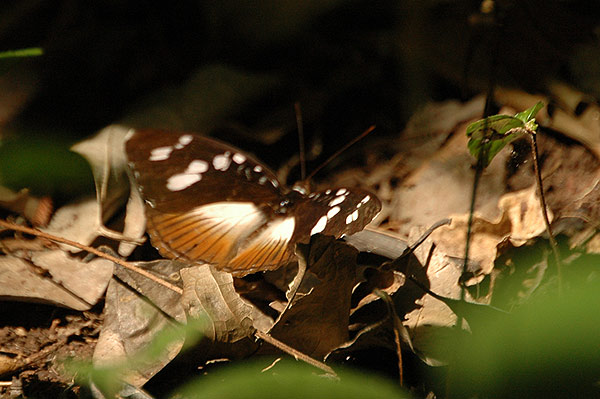

Scientific classification
- Domain: Eukaryota
- Kingdom: Animalia
- Phylum: Arthropoda
- Class: Insecta
- Order: Lepidoptera
- Family: Nymphalidae
- Genus: Amauris
- Species: A. hecate

Binomial name
- Amauris hecate (Butler, 1866)

Synonyms
- Danais hecate Butler, 1866; Amauris dira Neave, 1904; Amauris hecate f. reducta Bartel, 1905; Amauris hecate ab. bedoci Dufrane, 1948; Amauris hecate ab. lagai Dufrane, 1948; Amauris hecate f. draedada Stoneham, 1958; Amauris hecate f. tenebrosa Stoneham, 1958; Amauris hecate f. expansa Stoneham, 1958

= Amauris hecate =

Species of butterfly

Amauris hecate, the dusky Danaid, scarce monk or black friar, is a species of butterfly of the family Nymphalidae. It is found in Africa, from Guinea and Liberia to Ghana, Cameroun, Angola, Zaire, Uganda, Southern Sudan and Western Kenya and Southern Ethiopia.

== Subspecies ==
- Amauris hecate hecate (Guinea, Liberia to Ghana, Cameroon, Angola, Zaire, Uganda, Southern Sudan and Western Kenya)
- Amauris hecate stictica Rothschild & Jordan, 1903 (Southern Ethiopia)
