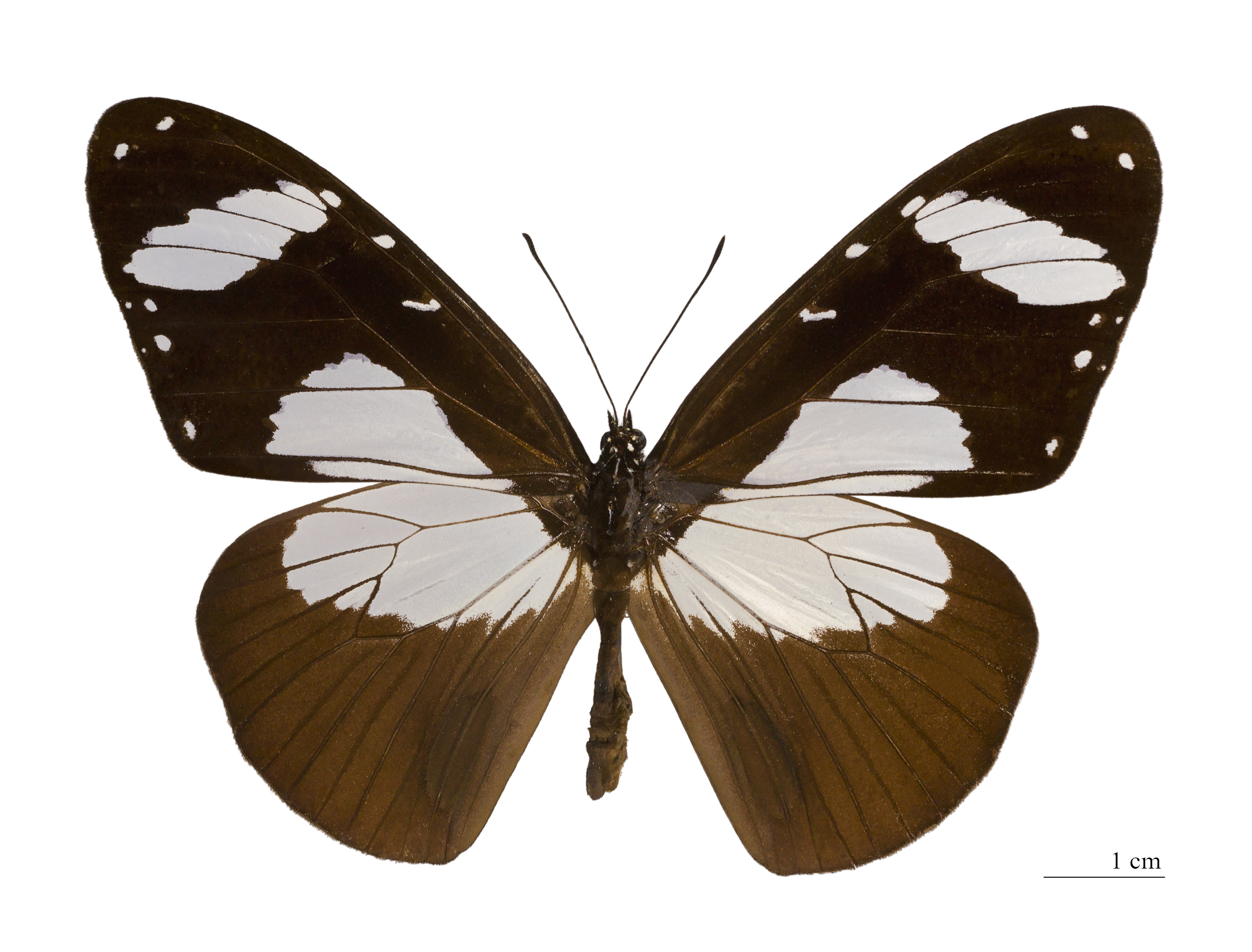
- Male, dorsal side
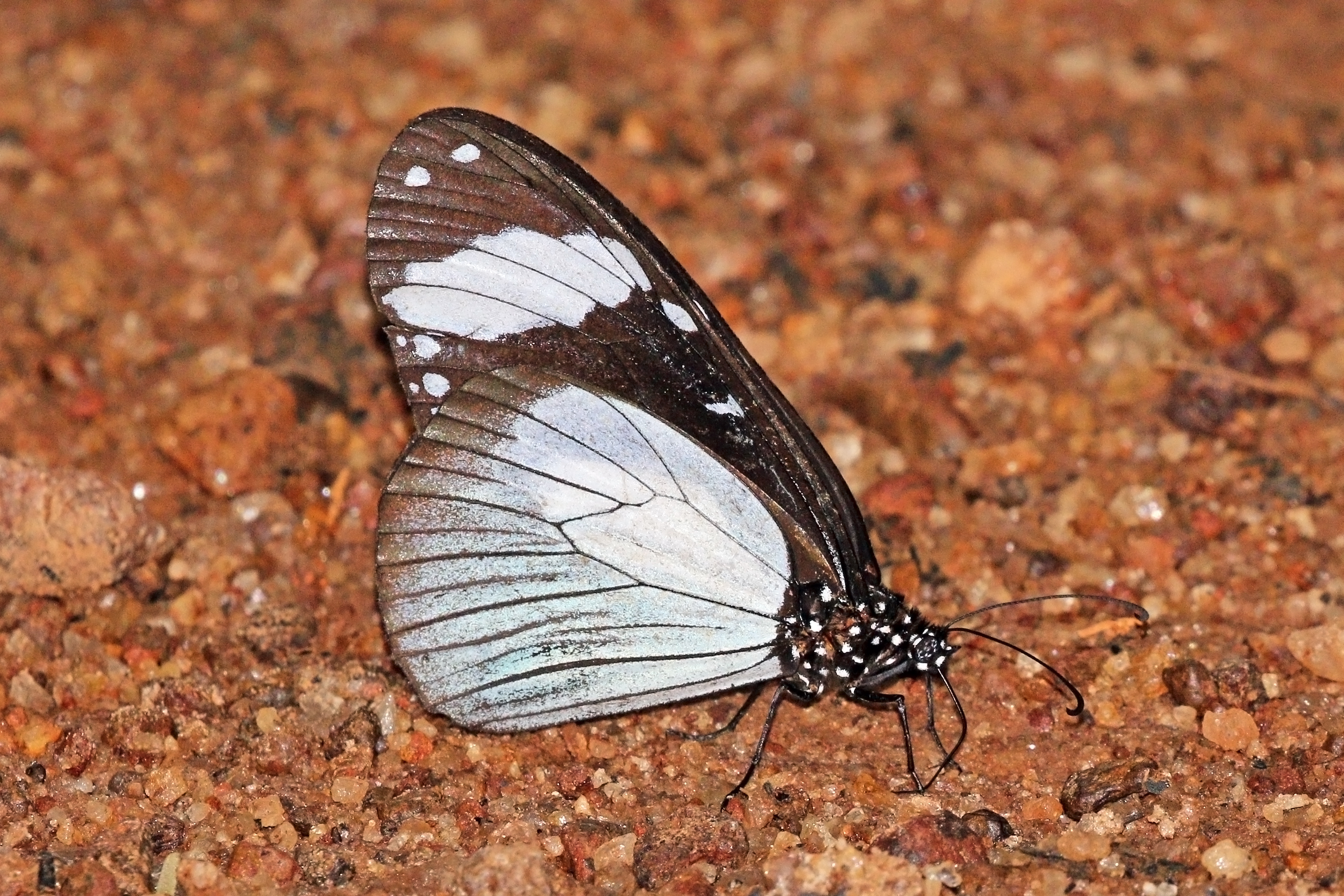
- Ventral side, Bobiri Forest, Ghana

Scientific classification
- Kingdom: Animalia
- Phylum: Arthropoda
- Clade: Pancrustacea
- Class: Insecta
- Order: Lepidoptera
- Family: Nymphalidae
- Genus: Amauris
- Species: A. niavius

Binomial name
- Amauris niavius (Linnaeus, 1758)

Synonyms
- Papilio niavius Linnaeus, 1758; Amauris obliterata Dufrane, 1948; Amauris partita Talbot, 1941; Amauris dominicanus Trimen, 1879

= Amauris niavius =

Species of butterfly

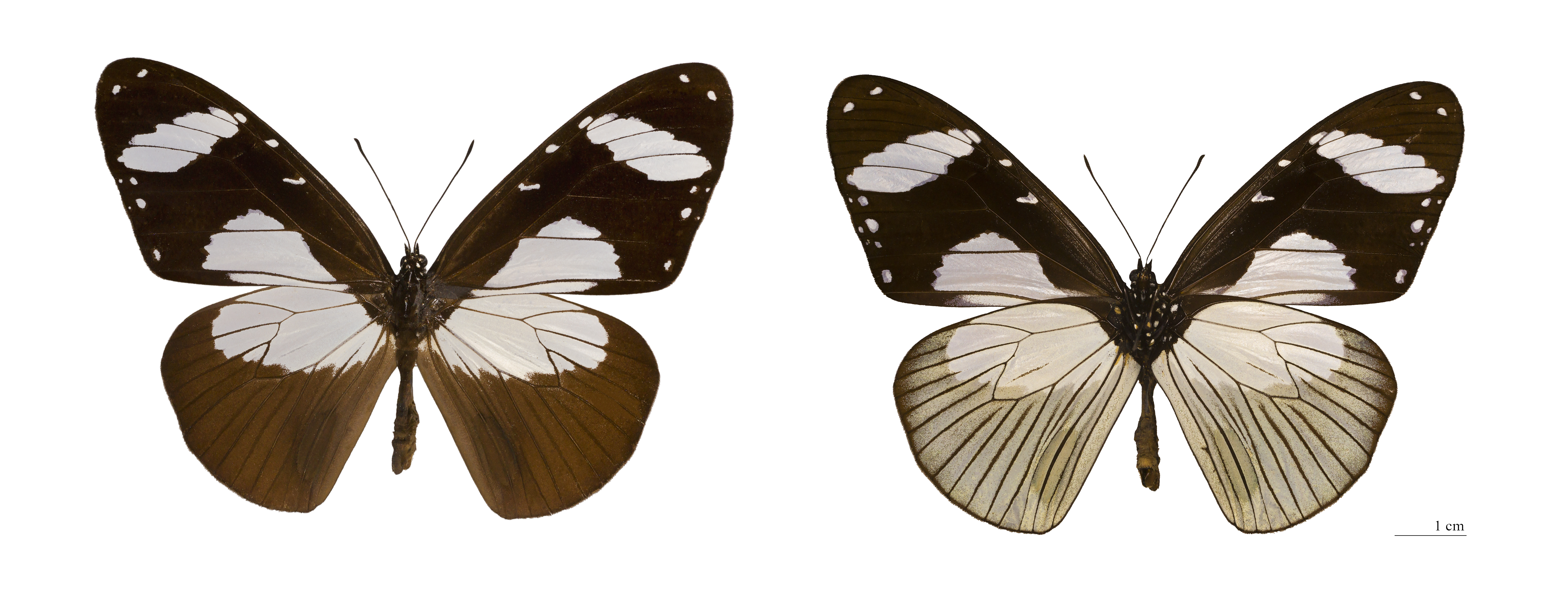
Amauris niavius - museum specimen

Amauris niavius, the friar, is a butterfly of the family Nymphalidae. It is found in the forests of tropical Africa.

The wingspan is 80–85 mm for males and 78–82 mm for females. Adults are on wing year-round (with peaks in late summer and autumn).

The larvae feed on Cynanchum (including C. medium, C. nigrum and C. vincetoxicum), Gymnema (including G. sylvestre), Marsdenia, Secamone, Vincetoxicum (syn. Tylophora) and Ipomoea. Larvae of subspecies dominicanus feed on Gymnema sylvestre.

== Subspecies ==
- Amauris niavius niavius (from western Kenya to Zaire, Angola, Cameroon, Sierra Leone, Guinea, Fernando Pó (Macías Nguema Island))
- Amauris niavius dominicanus Trimen, 1879 (Natal, Mozambique, from Rhodesia to Malawi, eastern Tanzania and Kenya east of the Rift Valley)
- Amauris niavius aethiops Rothschild & Jordan, 1903 (Ethiopia, northern Uganda, southern Sudan)

Torben Larsen developed a species numbering system for his 2005 publication Butterflies of West Africa. The nominate subspecies is #650. The 'Larsen' numbers have since been used with permission in A Sharp Eye on Butterflies of Ghana.
