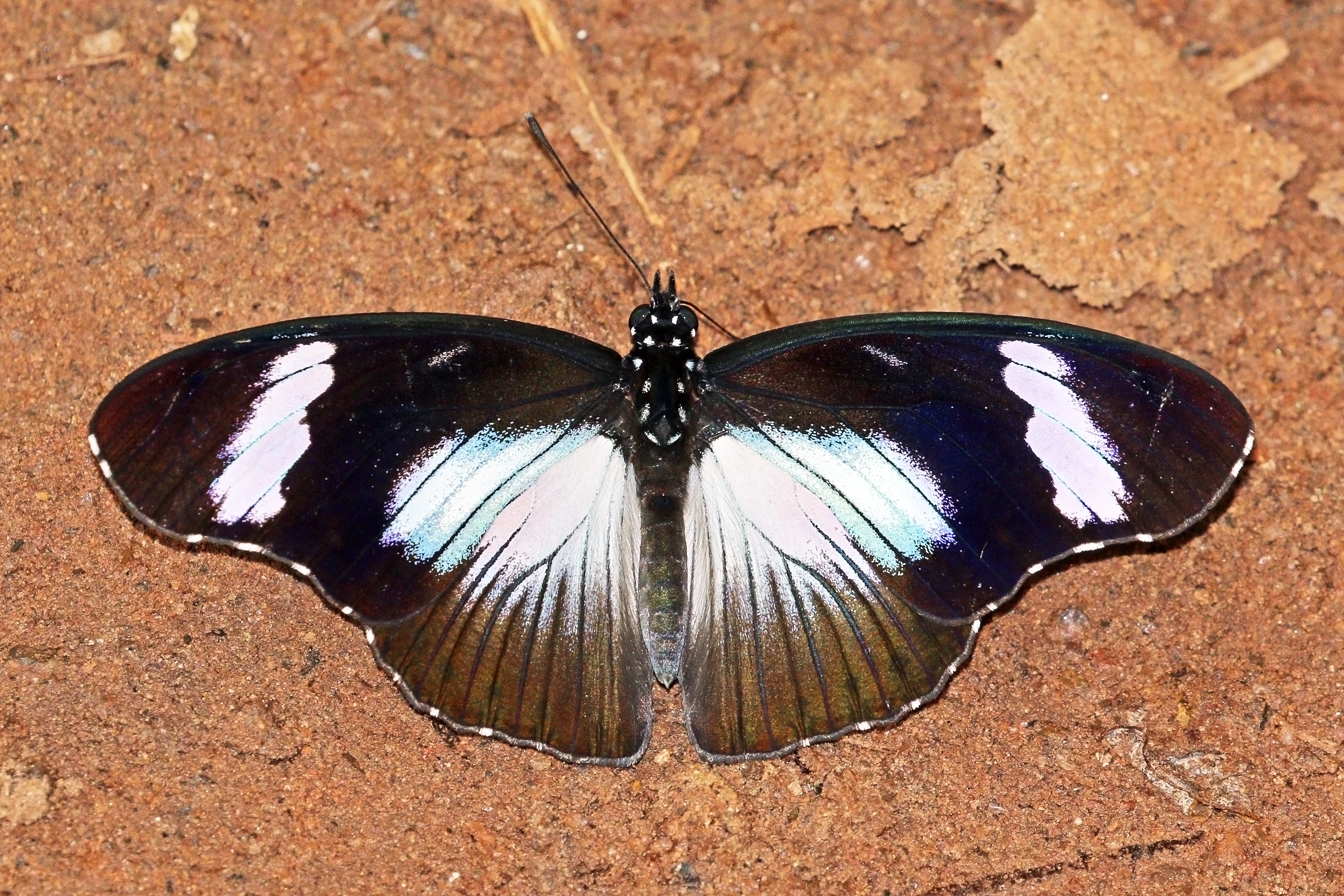
- male H. a. anthedon Bobiri Forest, Ghana

Scientific classification
- Kingdom: Animalia
- Phylum: Arthropoda
- Clade: Pancrustacea
- Class: Insecta
- Order: Lepidoptera
- Family: Nymphalidae
- Genus: Hypolimnas
- Species: H. anthedon

Binomial name
- Hypolimnas anthedon (Doubleday, 1845)

Synonyms
- Diadema anthedon Doubleday, 1845; Diadema damoclina Trimen, 1869; Papilio dubius Palisot de Beauvois, [1813-1830]; Diadema anthedon Doubleday, 1845; Hypolimnas dubia ab. cerberus Aurivillius, 1894; Hypolimnas daemona Staudinger, 1896; Hypolimnas daemona var. daemonides Staudinger, 1896; Hypolimnas dubius ab. latepicta Bartel, 1905; Hypolimnas dubius poensis Rothschild, 1918; Hypolimnas dubia dubia f. pseudodamoclina Dufrane, 1945; Hypolimnas dubia dubia ab. mariae Dufrane, 1945; Diadema wahlbergi Wallengren, 1857; Diadema mima Trimen, 1869; Euralia anthedon var. marginalis Butler, 1875; Hypolimnas angustilimbata Weymer, 1892; Hypolimnas mima f. millari Aurivillius, 1913; Panopea drucei Butler, 1874; Panopea bewsheri Butler, 1879; Panopea diffusa Butler, 1880; Hypolimnas madagascariensis Mabille, 1881; Hypolimnas lutescens Mabille, 1887; Hypolimnas limbata Crowley, 1890; Hypolimnas dubius mayottensis Rothschild, 1918; Hypolimnas dubia antelmei Le Cerf, 1928

= Hypolimnas anthedon =

Species of butterfly

Hypolimnas anthedon, the variable eggfly or variable diadem, is a species of Hypolimnas butterfly found in southern Africa. There are four known subspecies, but it is very variable species with many morphs.

The wingspan of the variable eggfly is 75–80 for males and 74–90 for females.

Its flight period is year round, peaking in late summer.

The larva of Hypolimnas anthedon eat: Fleurya species, Urera camerooensis, Urera camerooensis, Urtica, and Berkheya.

== Subspecies ==
- H. a. anthedon (southern Senegal, Gambia, Guinea-Bissau, Guinea, Sierra Leone, Liberia, Ivory Coast, Ghana, Togo, Nigeria, Cameroon, Equatorial Guinea, Gabon, Congo, Central African Republic, Angola, Democratic Republic of the Congo, southern Sudan, western Kenya, north-western Tanzania, northern and north-western Zambia)
- H. a. drucei (Butler, 1874) (Madagascar, Comoros, Mauritius)
- H. a. wahlbergi (Wallengren, 1857) (Ethiopia, eastern Democratic Republic of the Congo, Kenya (east of the Rift Valley), eastern Tanzania, Zambia, Mozambique, Zimbabwe, South Africa, Eswatini)

Torben Larsen developed a species numbering system for his 2005 publication Butterflies of West Africa. The nominate subspecies is #802. The 'Larsen' numbers have since been used with permission in A Sharp Eye on Butterflies of Ghana, where various forms of the male and female are illustrated.

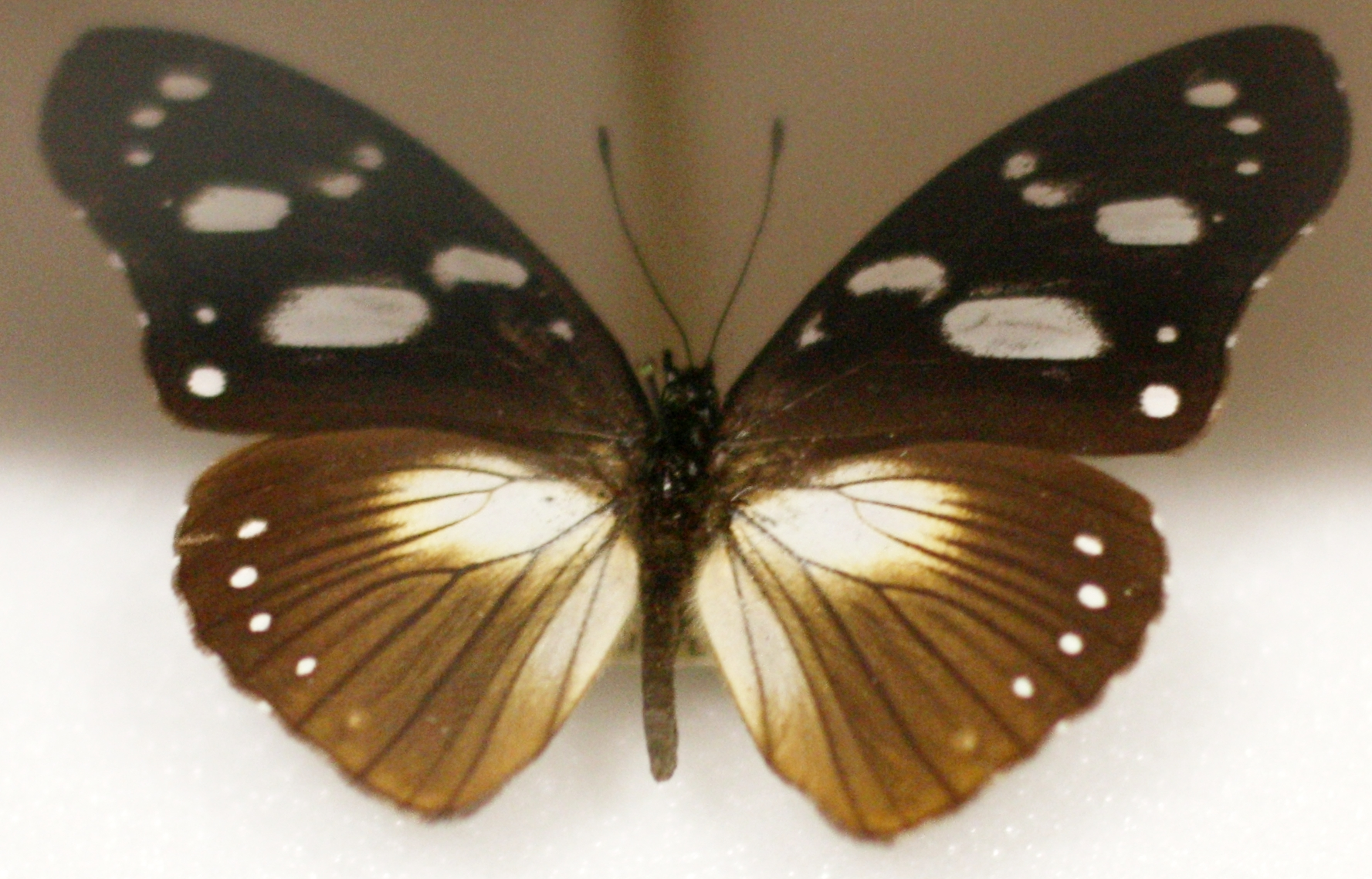
H. a. drucei from Madagascar

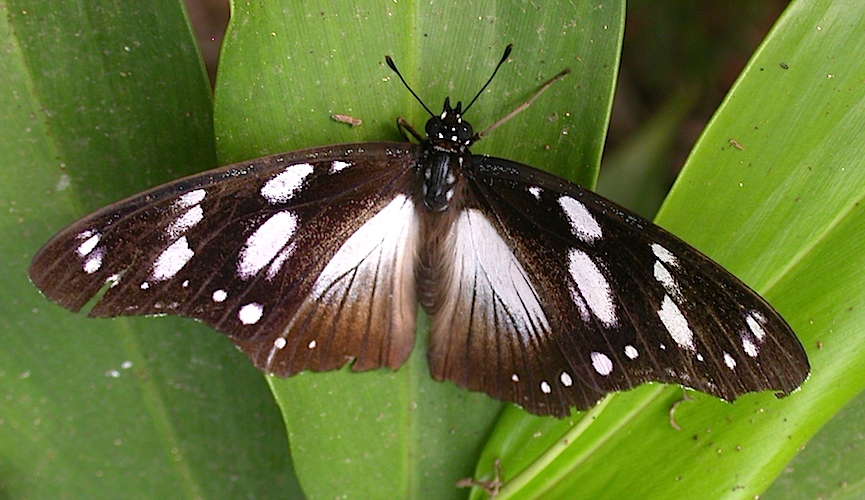
Benin
