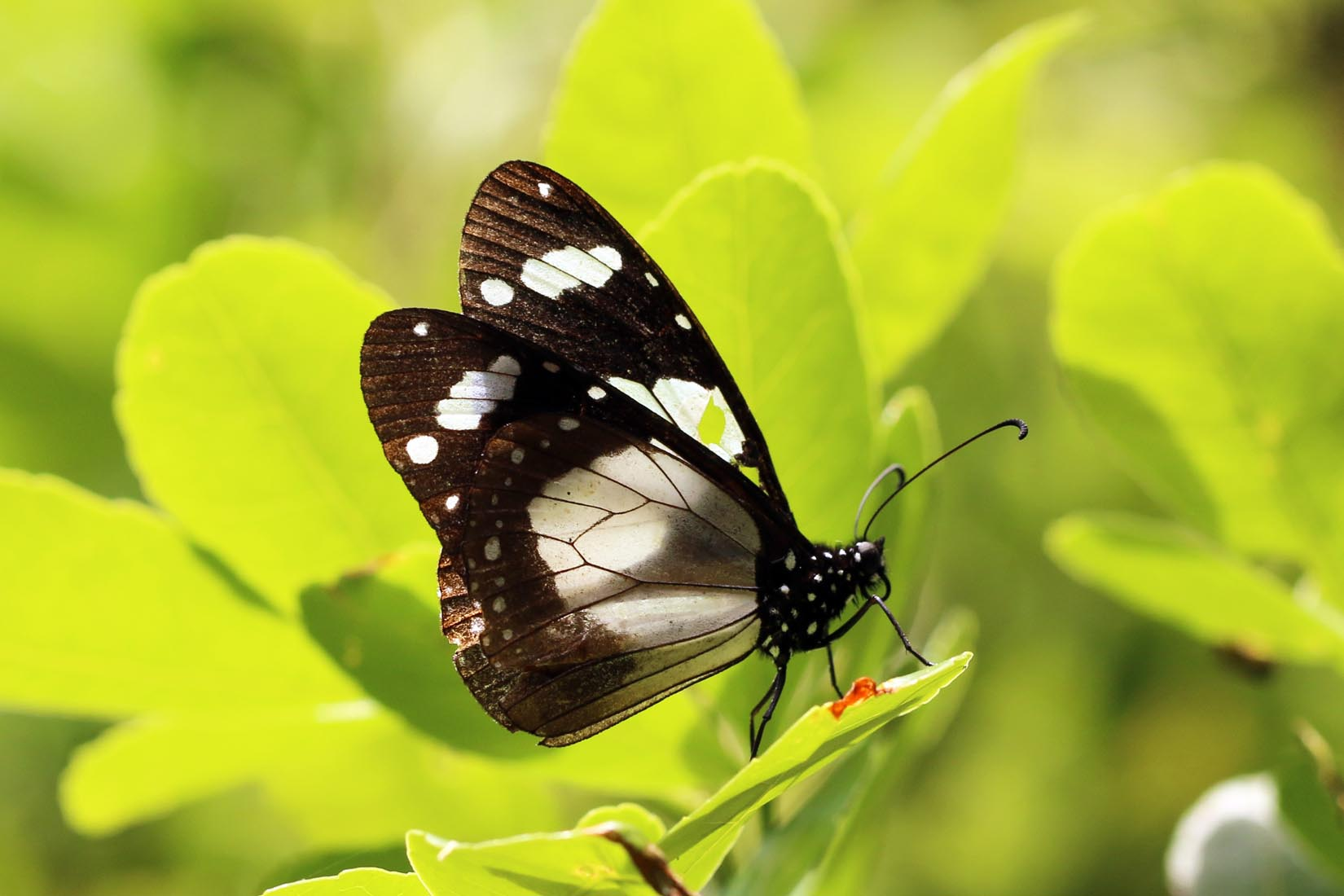
- A. ochlea female

Scientific classification
- Domain: Eukaryota
- Kingdom: Animalia
- Phylum: Arthropoda
- Class: Insecta
- Order: Lepidoptera
- Family: Nymphalidae
- Subtribe: Danaina
- Genus: Amauris; Hübner, 1816

Synonyms
- Amaura Geyer, 1837; Amaurina Aurivillius, 1910 nec Kolbe, 1895; Berethis Moore, 1883; Cadytis Moore, 1883; Conoploea Guenée, 1865; Egialea Hemming, 1964; Nebroda Moore, 1883; Panamauris Bryk, 1937

= Amauris =

Genus of brush-footed butterflies

Amauris is a genus of nymphalid butterflies in the Danainae subfamily. Amauris niavius niavius, Amauris echeria jacksoni, and Amauris dominicanus are mimicked by Papilio dardanus females. Other mimics of Amauris are found among other species of Papilio, the nymphaline genus Pseudacraea, and Hypolimnas anthedon.

== Species ==
- Amauris comorana – Comoro friar
- Amauris nossima – Madagascan friar
- Amauris phoedon – Mauritian friar
- Amauris niavius – friar
- Amauris tartarea – monk
- Amauris ellioti – Ansorge's Danaid
- Amauris echeria
- Amauris vashti
- Amauris crawshayi
- Amauris damocles
- Amauris hyalites
- Amauris albimaculata – layman
- Amauris ochlea – novice
- Amauris dannfelti
- Amauris inferna
- Amauris hecate – dusky Danaid
