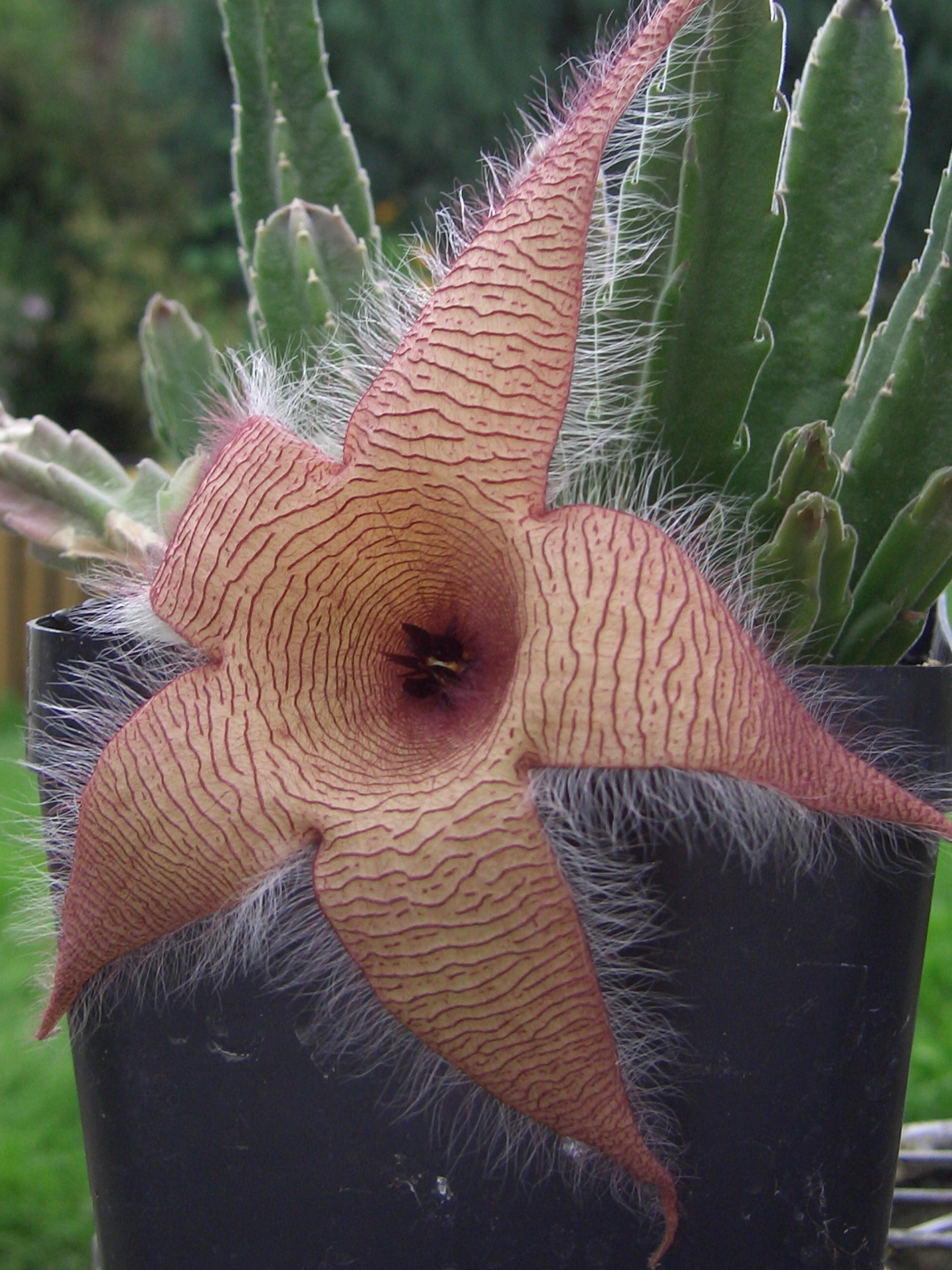
- Stapelia gigantea

Scientific classification
- Kingdom: Plantae
- Clade: Tracheophytes
- Clade: Angiosperms
- Clade: Eudicots
- Clade: Asterids
- Order: Gentianales
- Family: Apocynaceae
- Subfamily: Asclepiadoideae
- Tribe: Ceropegieae
- Subtribe: Stapeliinae; G. Don

Genera
- See text.

= Stapeliinae =

Subtribe of flowering plants

Stapeliinae is a subtribe of flowering plants within the tribe Ceropegieae of the subfamily Asclepiadoideae of the family Apocynaceae. The subtribe comprises about 35 genera, including both the stem-succulent "stapeliads" and the horticulturally popular genera Brachystelma and Ceropegia. The largest number of genera are native to Africa, but a more limited number of genera are widespread in Arabia and Asia. Historically, a similarly circumscribed taxon was treated as a separate tribe, Stapelieae.

== Description ==
Most of the genera of plants within the subtribe Stapeliinae are to varying degrees stem succulents, often referred to as "stapeliads". Many of these resemble cacti, though are not closely related, as an example of convergent evolution. The stems are often angular, mostly four-angled in cross-section, but in some species there are six or more, with some species of Hoodia having more than thirty angles. In size they vary from less than 2.5 cm/1" in length to over 2 m/6" tall. The leaves are in most species reduced to rudiments, sometimes hardened and thornlike, arranged on bumps or tubercles on the angles. Some species, however, still have recognisable leaves, most notably the Indian species Boucerosia frerei (syn. Frerea indica), and some members of Tridentea. Stapeliads are most abundant in warm, dry climates. In Africa, there are two separate regions where stapeliads have most diversified: northeast Africa, and Southern Africa. Several species are endemic to the small island of Socotra off the Horn of Africa. The Arabian Peninsula, and most specifically the country of Yemen, contain another concentration of species. Several more are found in the drier parts of Pakistan, Afghanistan, India, Nepal, and Myanmar. A single species, Apteranthes europaea (syn. Caralluma europaea) is found in Europe, in the very southern part of the Iberian peninsula and in the island of Lampedusa. Stapeliads are often regarded as a climax group within the family because of their often structurally complex flowers. Certain aspects of these reproductive parts mirror the pollination systems in the orchid family and represent a case of parallel evolution though both groups are quite unrelated and have developed similar, though not identical means to achieve the ultimate goal of pollination and therefore reproduction. Most stapeliads use flies as pollinators, that are attracted to odours resembling dung or rotting meat, emanating from the flowers. Many of the flowers also bear some physical resemblance to rotting animal carcasses, leading to their popular name of "carrion flowers". However, not all stapeliads smell bad, or attract flies. Some species use beetles, bees, wasps, butterflies or moths as pollinators. Stapeliad flowers range in size from mere millimetres in species of Echidnopsis and Pseudolithos to those of Stapelia gigantea that can reach 40 cm/16" in diameter, and are some the largest of flowers to be found on any species of succulent.

Flowers are actinomorphic (radially symmetrical) with 5 free or fused sepals and petals. Some petals are formed in a shape of a star while some have a tubular shaped corolla. On some species, a raised ring or annulus is present in the center of the corolla. Instead of stamens and pistils, stapeliads contain a pollinarium.

== Taxonomy ==
The first use of the subtribe (using the name Stapelieae) was by George Don in 1838. Don's taxon included both Ceropegia and Stapelia. Later workers, such as George Bentham, used these genera as the basis of two separate tribes, Ceropegieae and Stapeliae. The two tribes were formally reunited in 1991 as the tribe Ceropegieae. In 2004, Ulrich Meve and Sigrid Liede reintroduced the subtribe as a division of the tribe Ceropegieae, supported by molecular phylogenetic studies. Subsequent studies, including one in 2017, have confirmed the division of the tribe Ceropegieae into four subtribes, of which Stapeliinae is the most derived:

- Ceropegieae
  - Heterostemminae
  - - Leptadeniinae
    - - Anisotominae
      - Stapeliinae

=== Genera ===
In 2014, Endress, Liede-Schumann and Meve placed the following genera in subtribe Stapeliinae. As of December 2023, some are treated as synonyms by Plants of the World Online.

- Anomalluma Plowes, synonym of Pseudolithos
- Apteranthes J.C.Mikan
- Australluma Plowes
- Baynesia Bruyns
- Boucerosia Wight & Arn.
- Brachystelma Sims
- Caralluma R.Br.
- Caudanthera Plowes
- Ceropegia L.
- Desmidorchis Ehrenb.
- Duvalia Haw.
- Duvaliandra M.G.Gilbert
- Echidnopsis Hook.f.
- Edithcolea N.E.Br.
- Hoodia Sweet ex Decne.
- Huernia R.Br.
- Larryleachia Plowes
- Lavrania Plowes
- Monolluma Plowes
- Notechidnopsis Lavranos & Bleck
- Ophionella Bruyns
- Orbea Haw.
- Orbeanthus L.C.Leach, synonym of Orbea
- Pectinaria Haw.
- Piaranthus R.Br.
- Pseudolithos P.R.O.Bally
- Quaqua N.E.Br.
- Rhytidocaulon P.R.O.Bally
- Richtersveldia Meve & Liede
- Socotrella Bruyns & A.G.Miller
- Stapelia L.
- Stapelianthus Choux ex White & Sloane
- Stapeliopsis Pillans
- Tavaresia Welw.
- Tridentea Haw.
- Tromotriche Haw.
- Whitesloanea Chiov.
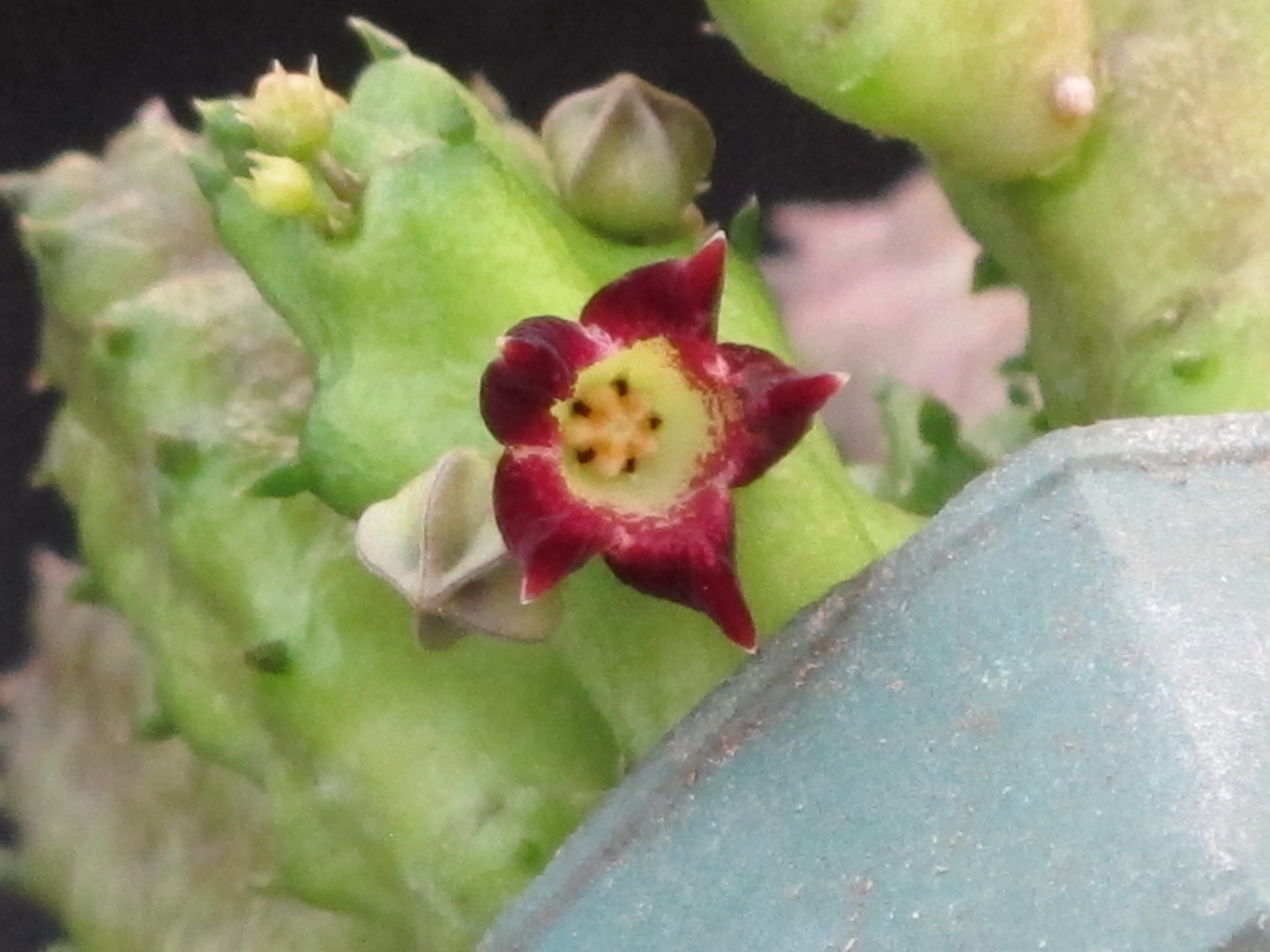
Baynesia lophophora

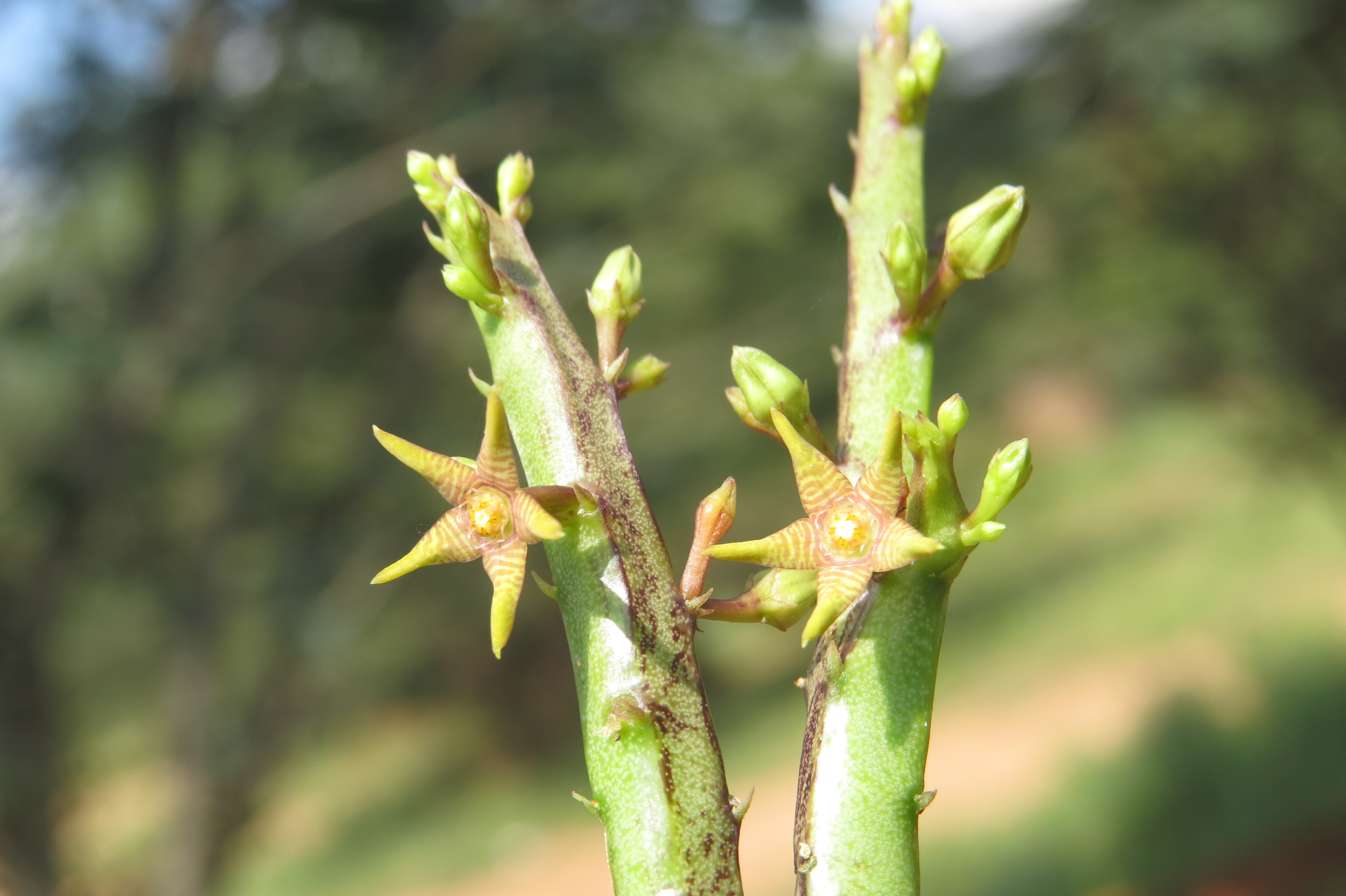
Caralluma stalagmifera

Ceropegia distincta

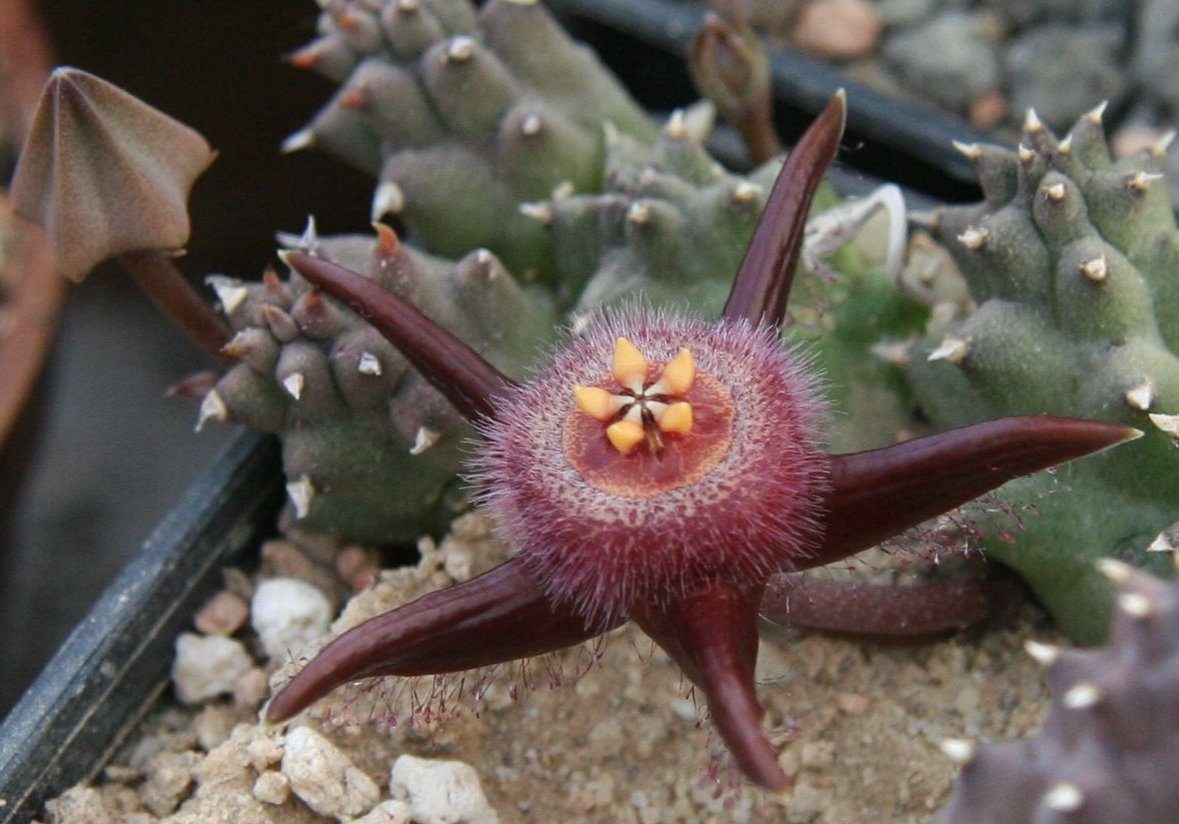
Duvalia corderoyi

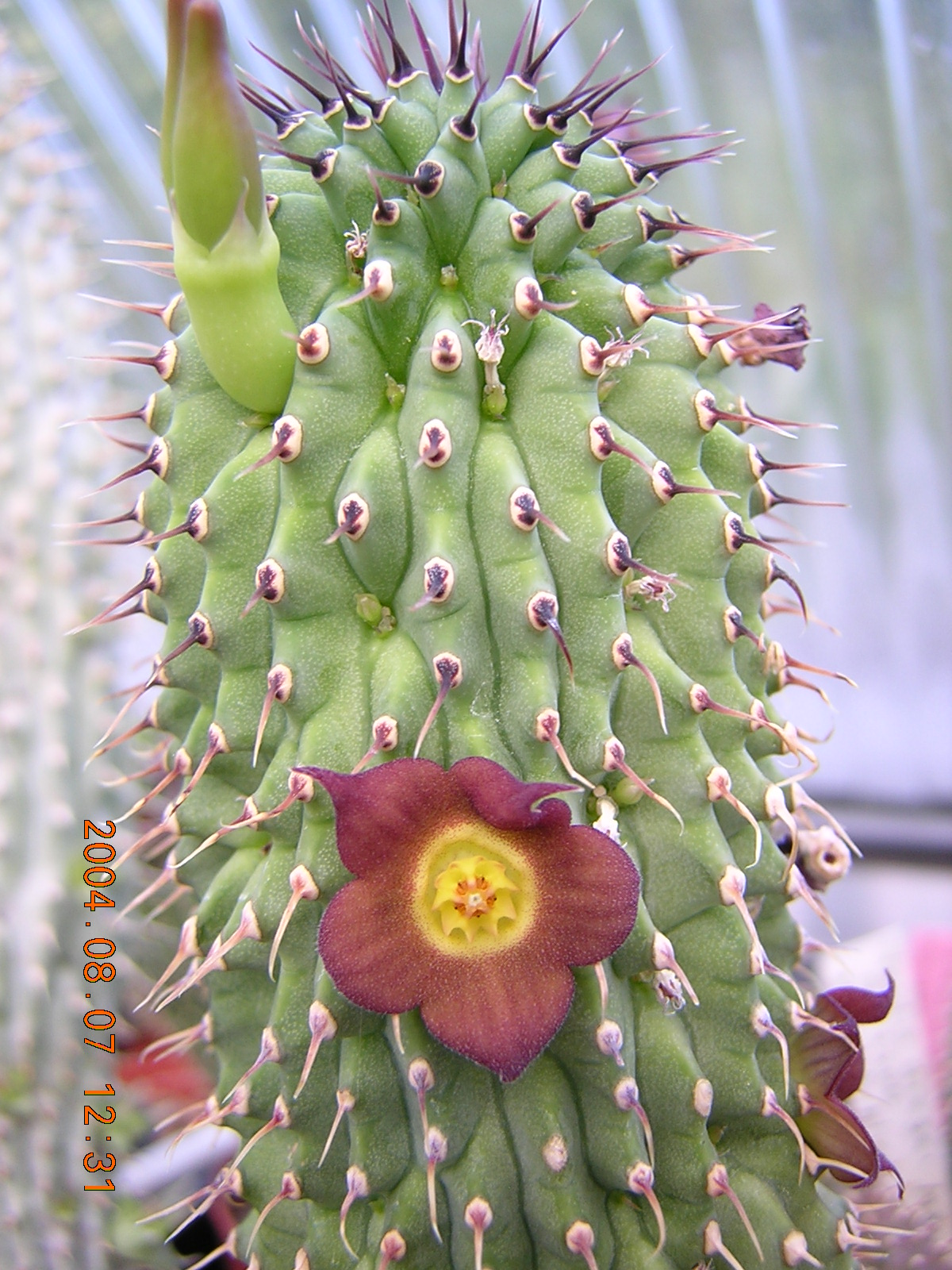
Hoodia officinalis

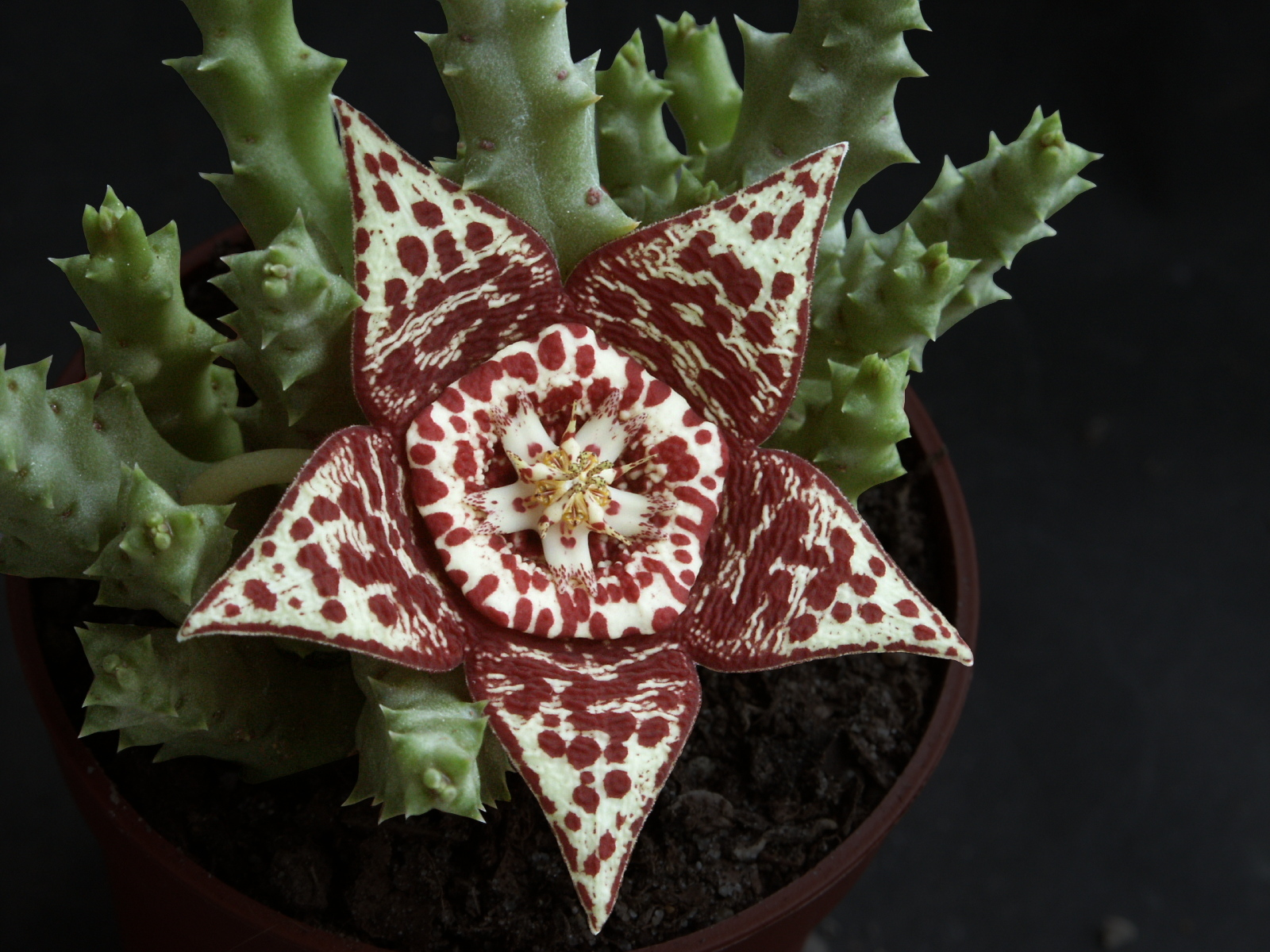
Orbea variegata

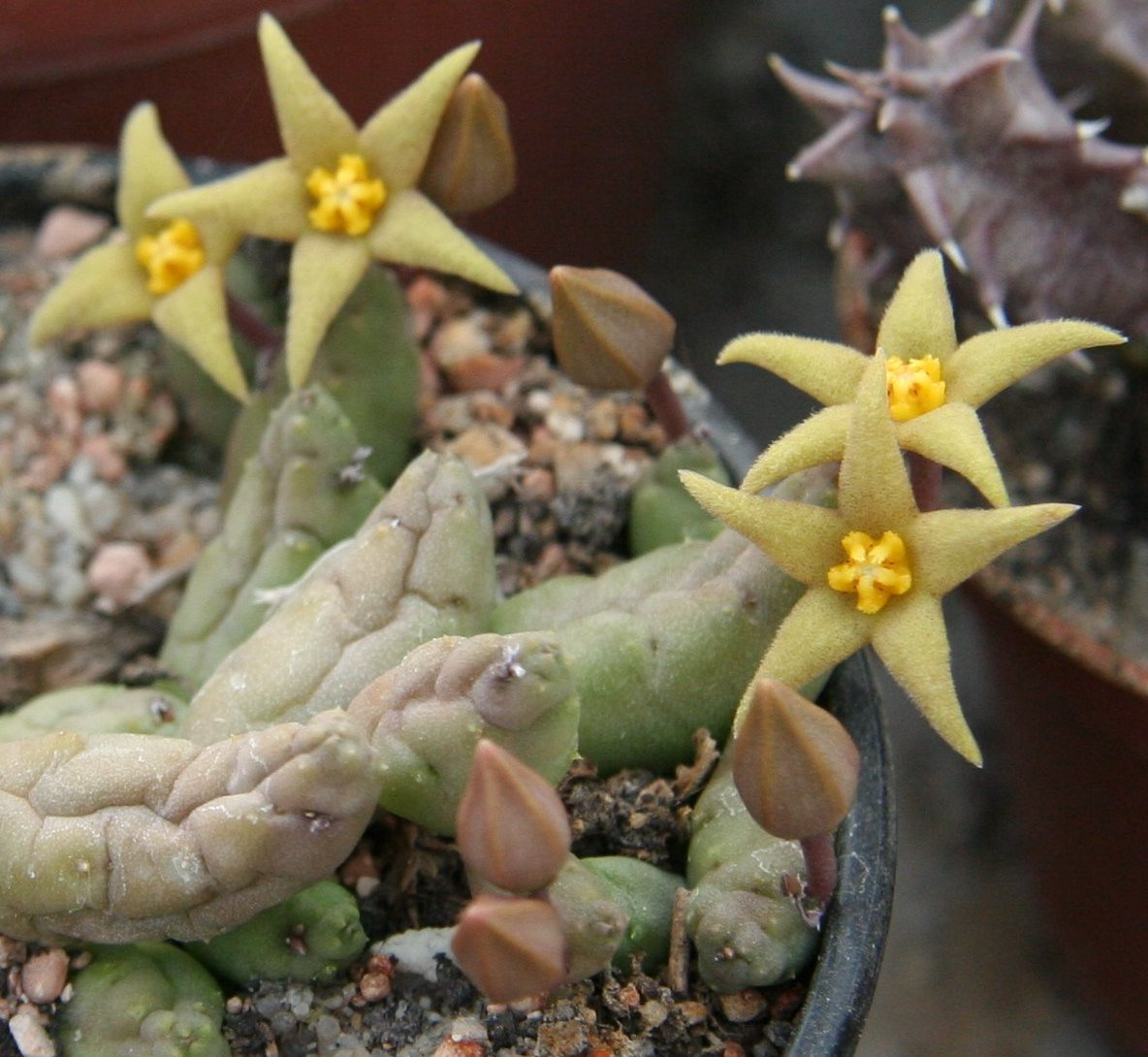
Piaranthus geminatus

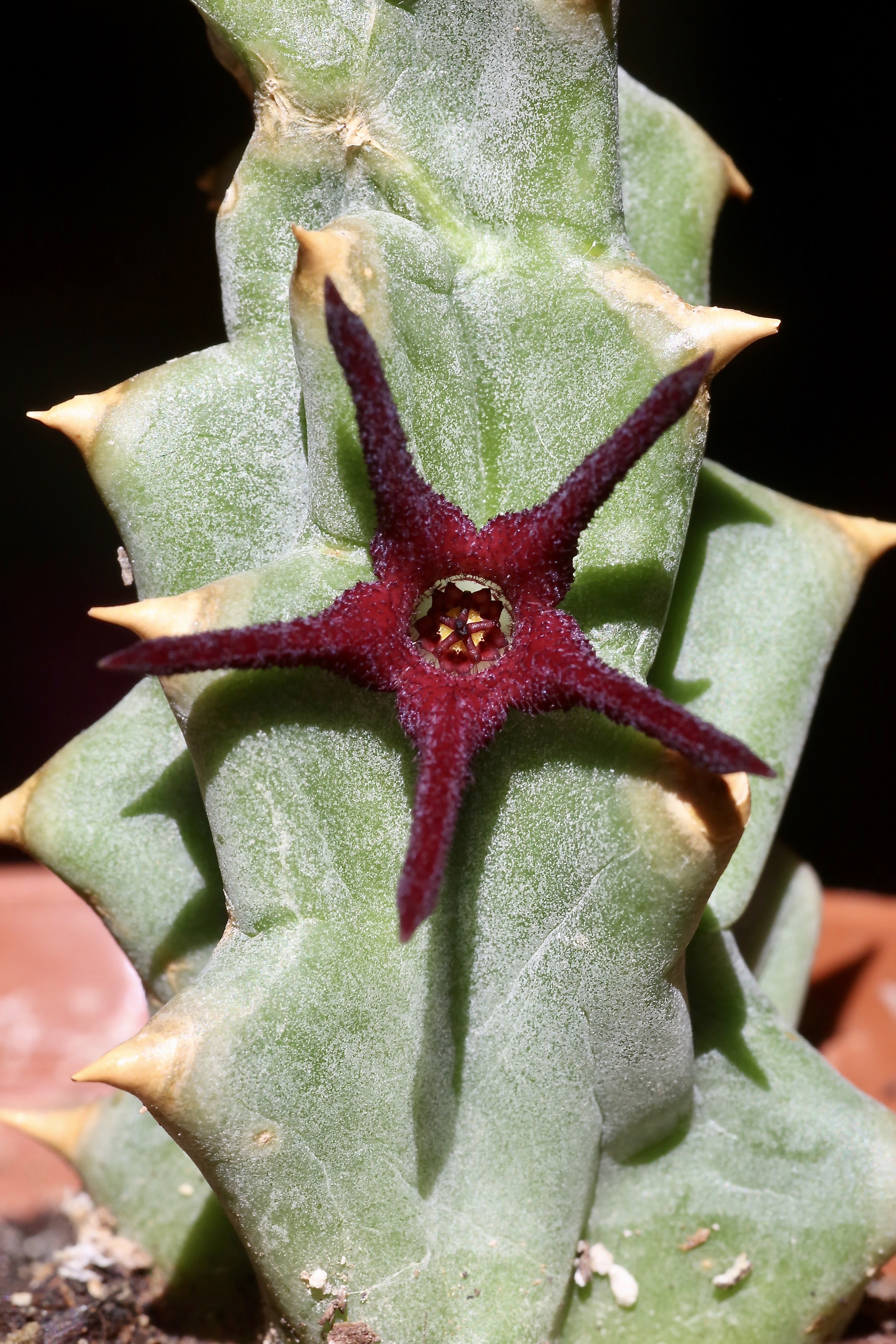
Quaqua mammillaris

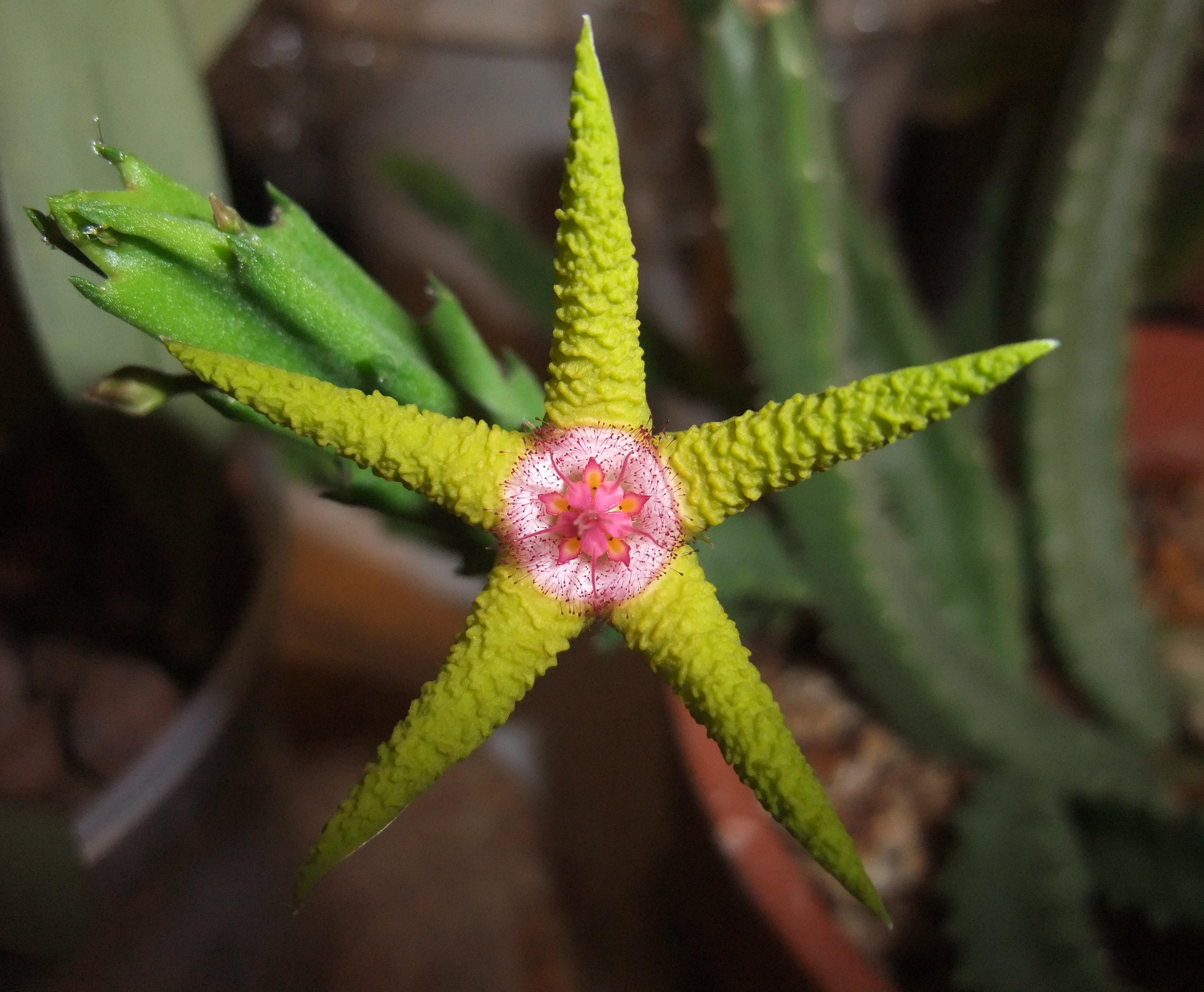
Stapelia flavopurpurea
