= Starfish flower =

Starfish flower may refer to:

- Stapelia grandiflora, a species of flowering plant in the genus Stapelia
- Stapelia hirsuta, a species of flowering plant in the genus Stapelia
