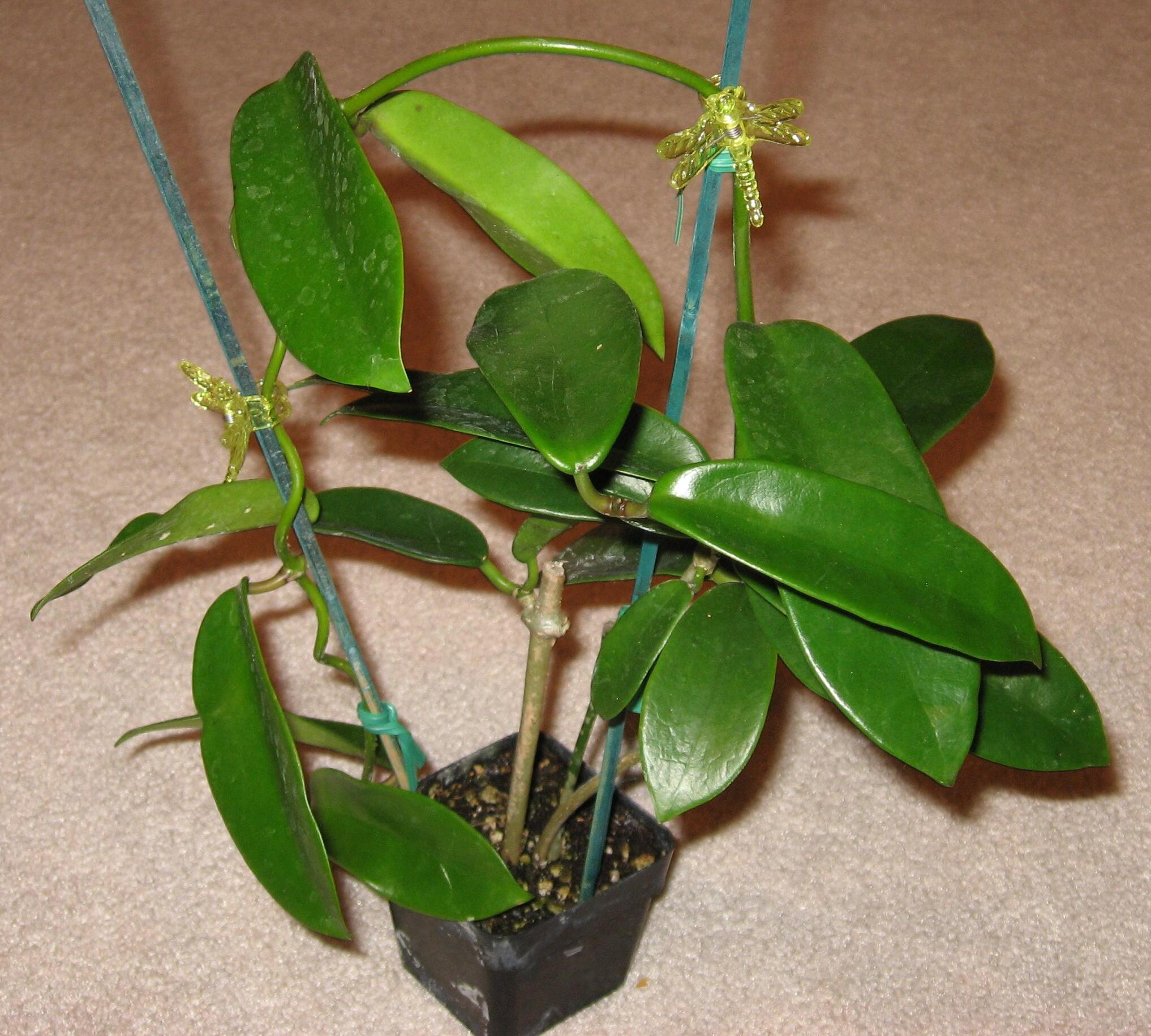

Scientific classification
- Kingdom: Plantae
- Clade: Tracheophytes
- Clade: Angiosperms
- Clade: Eudicots
- Clade: Asterids
- Order: Gentianales
- Family: Apocynaceae
- Genus: Hoya
- Species: H. meliflua

Binomial name
- Hoya meliflua (Blanco) Merr.

Synonyms
- Stapelia meliflua Blanco

= Hoya meliflua =

Species of plant in the dogbane family

Hoya meliflua is a species of vine in the Apocynaceae family. It is endemic to the Philippines. The vine is common to Apayao, La Union, Rizal, Bataan, Laguna, Mindoro, Palawan, Negros, Panay, and Leyte.

== Description ==
Hoya meliflua has stiff, succulent leaves with a very clean look to them with no venation.

The flowers are reddish orange and have nectaries near the base of the central column from which a dark sap is produced that stains very easily. In fact, its name is derived from the word "mellis" meaning honeydew and the word "fluo" meaning flow, referring to the dark nectar of the plant that stains the flowers. The plant flowers in June in the Philippines and each flower cluster comes with 10–20 flowers.

Subspecies

There is also a subspecies, Hoya meliflua ssp. fraterna, that has longer, narrower leaves.

== Discovery ==
Hoya meliflua was first described in 1837 by Francisco Manuel Blanco, who mistakenly identified it as a Stapelia. He called it Stapelia meliflua. Hoya meliflua was originally found on the island of Luzon and so it was given the synonym Hoya luzonica by Rudolf Schlechter in 1905. Elmer Drew Merrill subsequently identified it as a Hoya, not Stapelia, and published it in Sp. Blancoanae 318 (1918) naming it Hoya meliflua.

There are several other synonyms for Hoya meliflua including Hoya carnosa named by Blanco in 1845, Hoya diversifolia by Fernandez in 1880, and Hoya parasitica by Fernandez in 1880. These synonyms were found to be invalid under Article 53.1 of international nomenclature.

Hoya meliflua is very similar to Hoya fraterna and is sometimes called 'the little fraterna'.

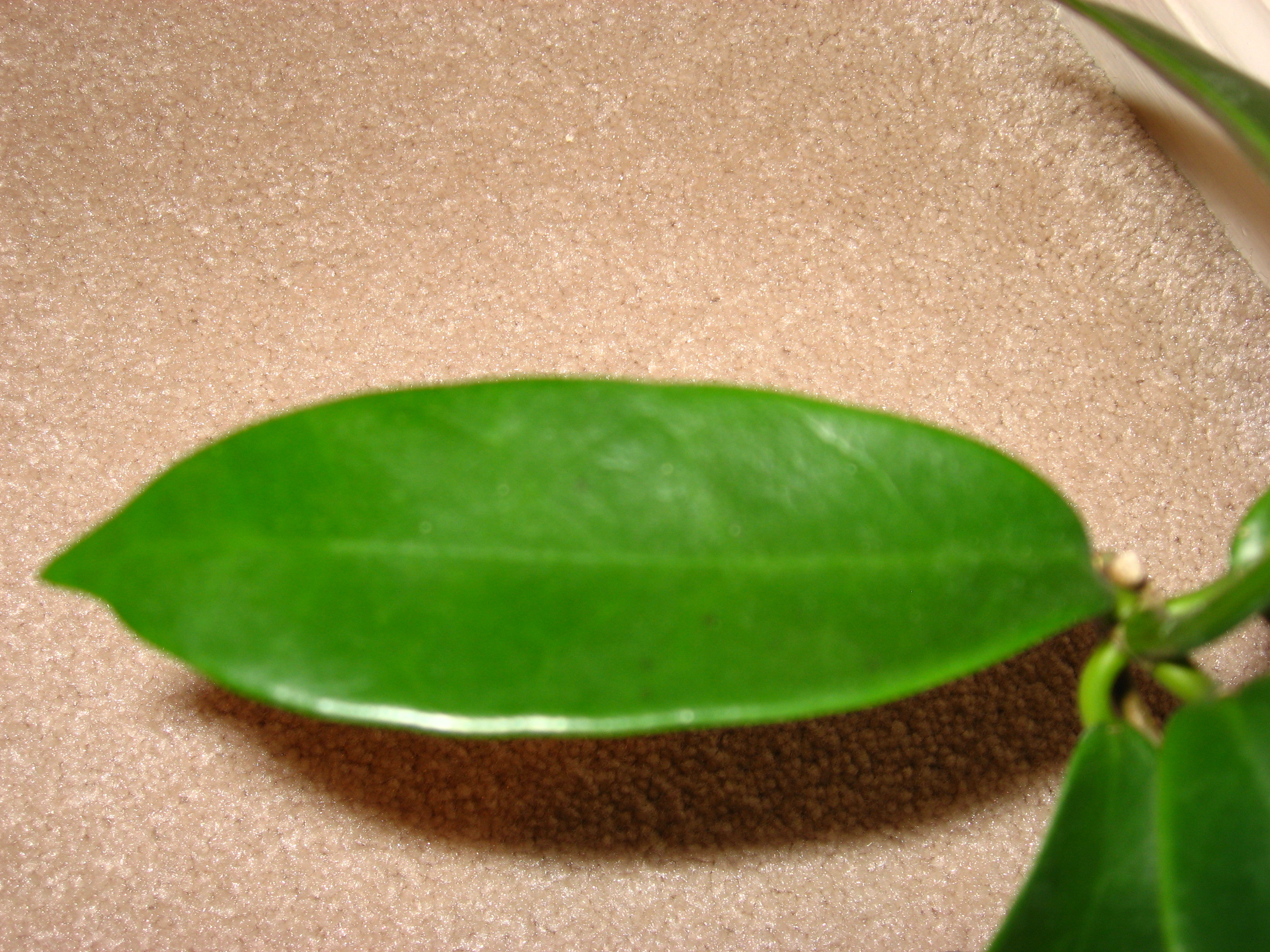

== Sources ==
- Species Blancoanae: A critical revision of the Philippine species of plants described by Blanco and Llanos, Bureau of Science, Published in Manila, p. 318 (1918)
- Worse, Perkins Fragm flora Philippinae p. 130 (1905)
- Dale Kloppenburg and Ann D. Wayman, The Hoya Handbook (A Guide for the Grower & Collector) 1992, p. 79
- Malesiana Bulletin Vol Flora (6) October 1995, article by Ted Green - H. meliflua Merrill ssp. Meliflua Merrill SSP. fraterna Green ssp. Fraterna Green SSP. nova Nova
- Reprinted in Fraterna 1 (1995), 2 (1995) and 9 (1995)
- Focke Albers, Ulli Meve succulents lexicon Volume 3 p. 156 (2002)
- Dale Kloppenburg, The World of Hoyas - a book of pictures (1999) p. 154 short description and photo of 155 S. Ann Wayman
- Information Bulletin No. 237/2005 of the Department of Science and Technology Las Banos Philippines, Philippine Hoyas from Simeona V. Siar, p. 10
