= Larry Leach (botanist) =

Rhodesian botanist (1909–1996)

- Born: 18 November 1909; Southend, England
- Died: 18 July 1996 (aged 86); Pietersburg, South Africa
- Scientific career
- Fields: Plant taxonomy
- Author abbrev. (botany): L.C.Leach

Leslie Charles "Larry" Leach (18 November 1909 Southend – 18 July 1996 Pietersburg) was a Rhodesian taxonomic botanist.

== Career ==
Leach arrived in Rhodesia in 1938 and carried on business in Salisbury as an electrical engineer. He developed an interest in succulent plants, particularly Stapelieae, Euphorbieae and the genus Aloe. He gave up the business world in 1956 and devoted himself to a self-financed taxonomic study of the three groups with a special interest in the "Flora Zambesiaca" region. He collected extensively in Mozambique and East Africa, also covering Angola, South West Africa and South Africa.

Between 1972 and 1981, Leach worked as Honorary Botanist of the staff of Rhodesia's National Herbarium and described himself as 'probably Rhodesia's only unpaid civil servant'. He coerced the Aloe, Cactus and Succulent Society of Rhodesia into producing a taxonomic series supplementary to Excelsa. Consequently, four volumes, including monographs of the Stapelieae, Orbea, Stapelia, Huernia and Tridentea, were authored by Leach and published between 1978 and 1988.

In 1981, he settled in South Africa, working at the National Botanic Garden at Worcester from 1982 to 1989, and finishing his work on the succulent Stapelieae of Southern Africa, publishing the results in Excelsa.

From 1990, he worked as Honorary Research Fellow in the Department of Botany at the University of the North near Pietersburg, where, before his death, he worked on the succulent Euphorbieae for Flora Zambeziaca.

He was awarded the Harry Bolus Medal by the Botanical Society of Southern Africa in 1968, the Rhodesia Scientific Association's gold medal in 1977 and had fellowship of the Cactus and Succulent Society of America conferred in 1983.

He is commemorated in numerous specific names such as Aloe leachii Reynolds, Huernia leachii Lavranos, Dombeya leachii Wild, the Asclepiad genus Larryleachia and the Choreocolacaceae genus Leachiella Plowes. This botanist is denoted by the author abbreviation L.C.Leach when citing a botanical name.
