= African cactus =

African cactus may refer to:

- Rhipsalis baccifera, a cactus whose native range includes Africa
- Opuntia, a genus of cactus which has been introduced to Africa
- Orbea variegata, a plant native to Africa colloquially called a starfish cactus or toad cactus
