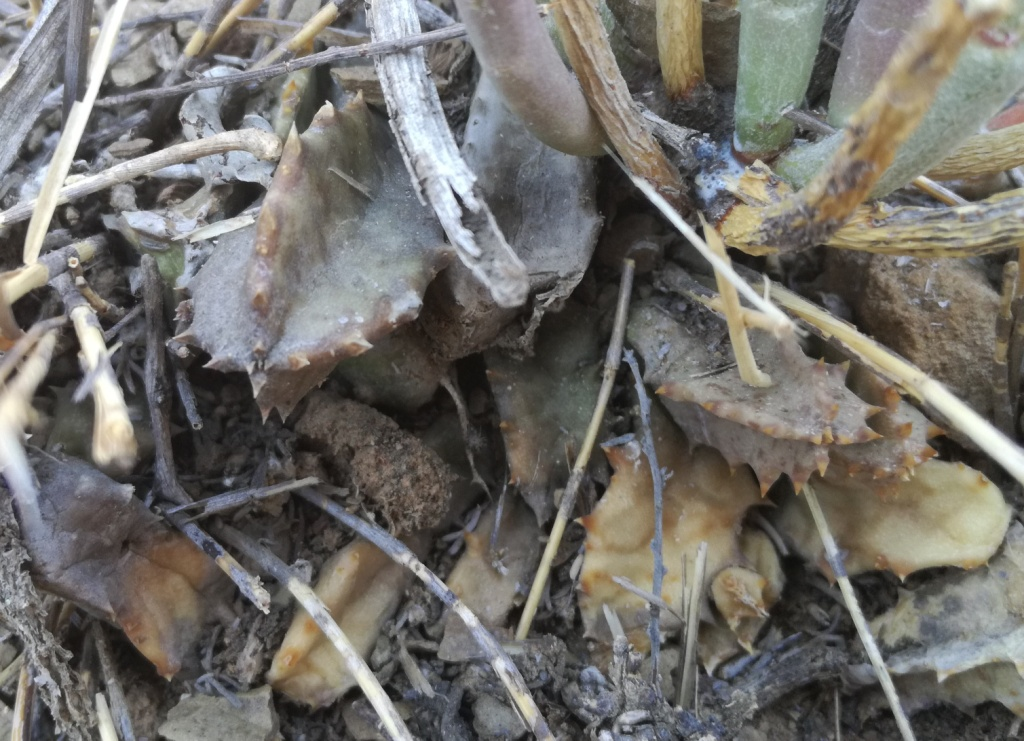
- Stems of Stapeliopsis saxatilis, the most widespread species of the genus

Scientific classification
- Kingdom: Plantae
- Clade: Tracheophytes
- Clade: Angiosperms
- Clade: Eudicots
- Clade: Asterids
- Order: Gentianales
- Family: Apocynaceae
- Subfamily: Asclepiadoideae
- Tribe: Ceropegieae
- Genus: Stapeliopsis; Pillans

= Stapeliopsis =

Genus of plants

Stapeliopsis is a genus of succulent plants in the family Apocynaceae, native to southern Africa.

== Description ==
Stapeliopsis was described as a genus in 1928. The name refers to its superficial resemblance to some species of the genus Stapelia (Greek "-opsis" = "look-alike"). The genus is extremely variable.

The stems are four-angled in cross-section, often with lines of teeth along the angles. In some species, the stems are prostrate or even push underground as rhizomes; in others the stems are more erect.

The flowers are highly tubular, with hairs inside the tube of the flower. They appear from the base of the stems and often are born underground (especially in the case of Stapeliopsis pillansii. The tips of many species' flower lobes curve inwards and touch at the tip, forming closed structures. Several species even use their flowers as cages to trap their insect pollinators - only releasing them when the flower wilts.

== Distribution ==
The genus occurs across southern Africa, but is absent from most of the interior, occurring mainly around the western and southern verges of the subcontinent. The species are mostly very rare and restricted in their range. Only Stapeliopsis saxatilis is relatively widespread in rocky areas of the Cape.

Species

1. Stapeliopsis breviloba (R.A. Dyer) Bruyns - Breede River Valley, Western Cape Province, South Africa
2. Stapeliopsis exasperata (Bruyns) Bruyns - Western Cape Province
3. Stapeliopsis neronis Pillans - Namaqualand in Namibia + Cape Province
4. Stapeliopsis pillansii (N.E. Br.) Bruyns - Cape Province
5. Stapeliopsis saxatilis (N.E. Br.) Bruyns - Widespread in Cape Province
6. Stapeliopsis urniflora Lavranos - Namibia

formerly included

1. S. ballyi, syn of Echidnopsis ballyi
2. S. cooperi, syn of Orbea cooperi
3. S. madagascariensis, syn of Stapelianthus madagascariensis
