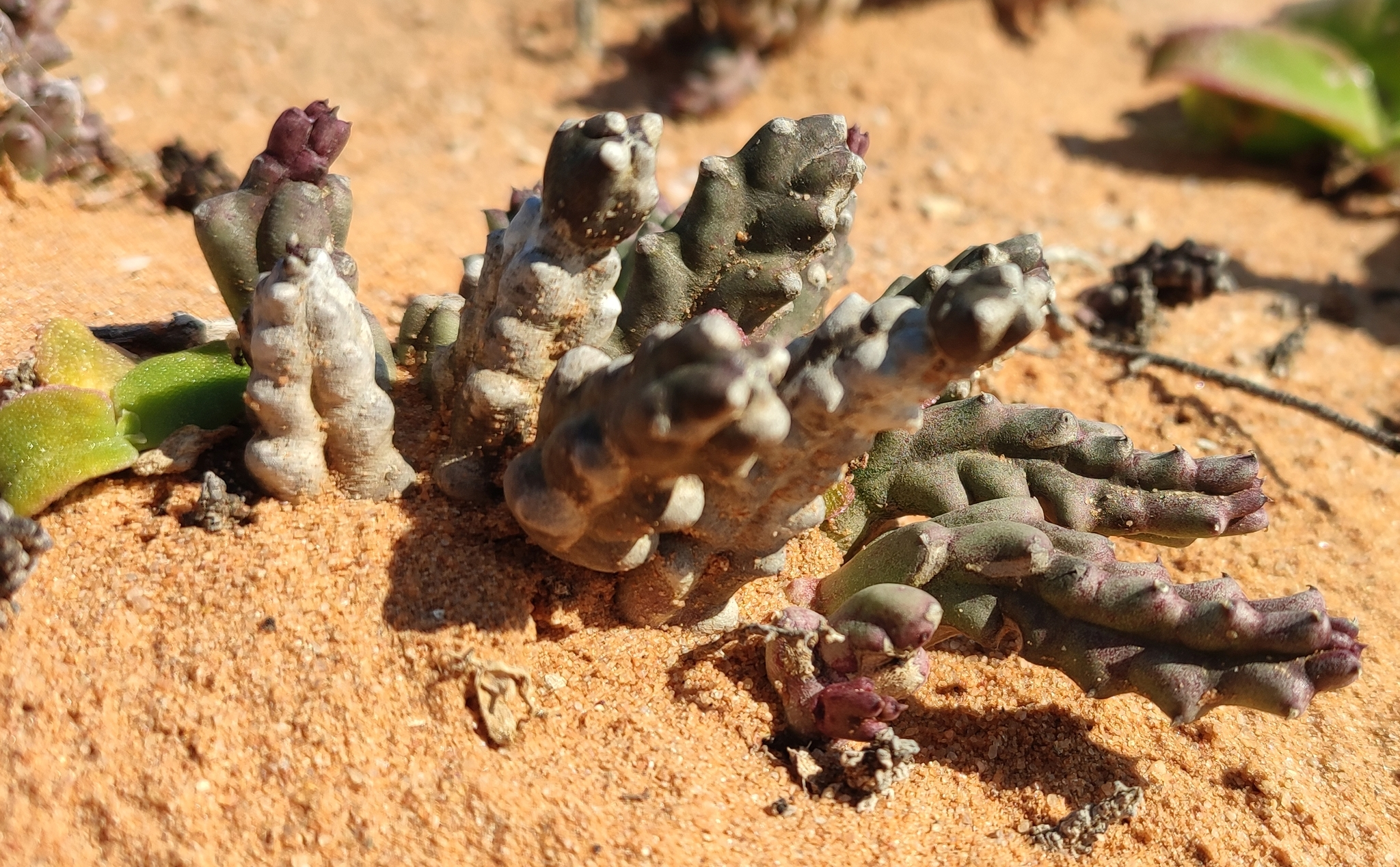
- Tridentea pachyrrhiza photographed in Northern Cape Province, South Africa

Conservation status
- Least Concern (IUCN 3.1)

Scientific classification
- Kingdom: Plantae
- Clade: Tracheophytes
- Clade: Angiosperms
- Clade: Eudicots
- Clade: Asterids
- Order: Gentianales
- Family: Apocynaceae
- Genus: Tridentea
- Species: T. pachyrrhiza

Binomial name
- Tridentea pachyrrhiza (Dinter) L.C.Leach

Synonyms
- Stapelia pachyrrhiza Dinter; Stapelia umbonata Pillans; Ceropegia pachyrrhiza (Dinter) Bruyns

= Tridentea pachyrrhiza =

Species of plant

Tridentea pachyrrhiza is a species of plant in the family Apocynaceae that is native to Namibia and South Africa.

== Distribution and habitat ==
Tridentea pachyrrhiza is found in South Africa and coastal Namibia, from Buntveldschuh in the north to Buchuberg in the south, at elevations between 50–300 m (160–980 ft) above sea level. It grows on stony flats among low shrubs, rarely on rocky outcrops, and is often covered with drifting sand.

== Description ==
Tridentea pachyrrhiza is a succulent plant that forms dense clumps measuring 60–200 mm (2.4–7.9 in) across. The stems are greyish green in colour, usually glabrous, and measure 30–60 mm (1.2–2.4 in) long and 10–15 mm (0.39–0.59 in) wide. The flowers are variable in colour and may measure up to 75 mm (3.0 in) across.
