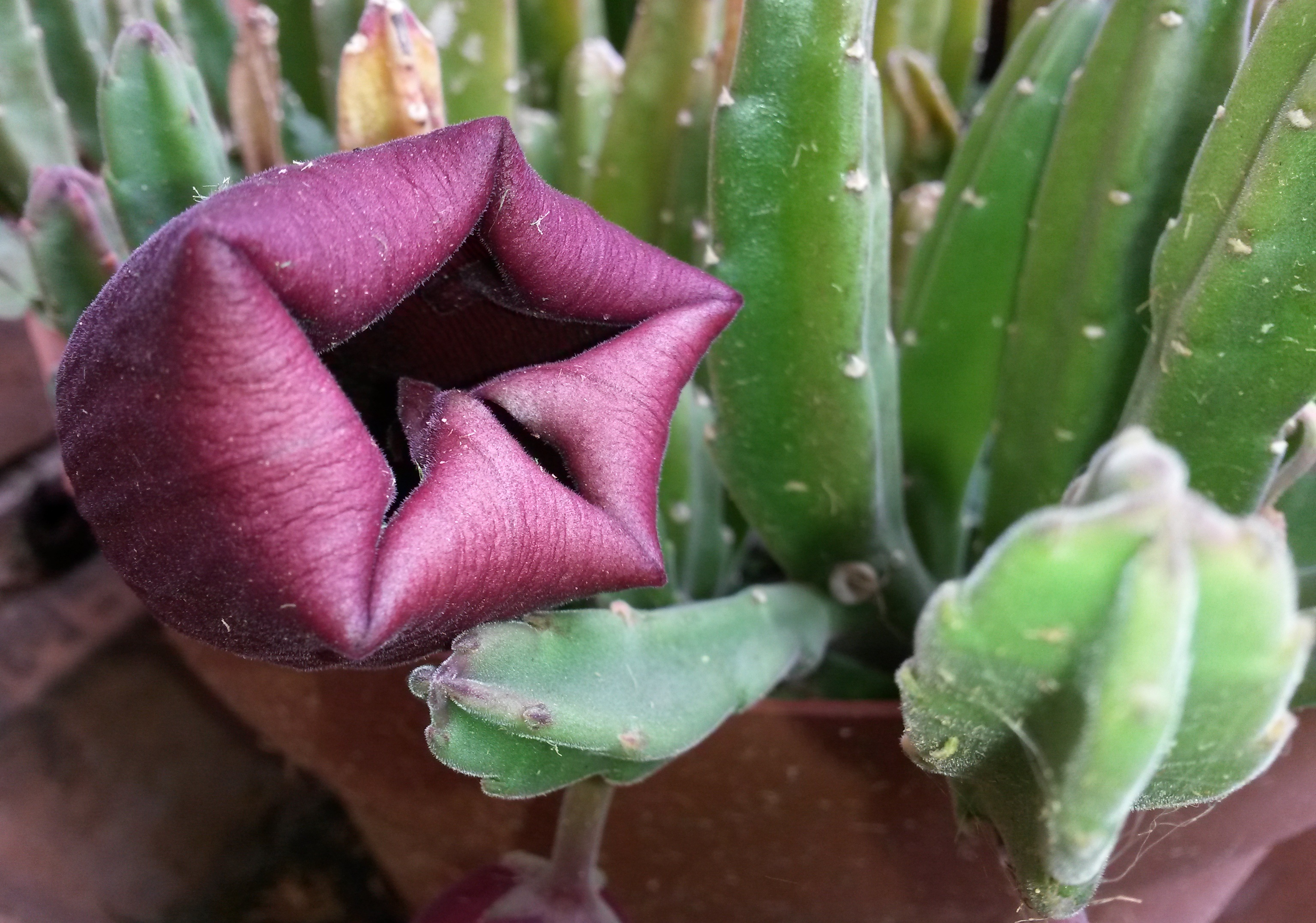

Scientific classification
- Kingdom: Plantae
- Clade: Tracheophytes
- Clade: Angiosperms
- Clade: Eudicots
- Clade: Asterids
- Order: Gentianales
- Family: Apocynaceae
- Genus: Stapelia
- Species: S. leendertziae

Binomial name
- Stapelia leendertziae N.E.Br. (1910)

Synonyms
- Ceropegia leendertziae (N.E.Br.) Bruyns (2017); Gonostemon leendertziae (N.E.Br.) P.V.Heath (1992); Stapelia wilmaniae C.A.Lückh. (1933)

= Stapelia leendertziae =

Species of plant

Stapelia leendertziae, commonly known as black bells, is a species of succulent plant in the family Apocynaceae that is native to Southern Africa. Other common names include, carrion flower, carrion chalice, rugose cup starfish, maroon cup starfish and star flower.

== Description ==
It forms succulent stems, with matte green to slightly shiny, more or less slender, four-ribbed shoots, the sides of which are strongly concave. The shoots grow from bent-down to upright and form compact growth forms. The leaflets are about 2.5 mm long and perishable. After the leaflets fall off, only white, crescent-shaped pockets remain around the base of the leaf.

=== Inflorescence ===
The purple flower bud is spherical or longitudinally oval and tapered at the apical point. It sits on a 2 to 3 cm long stalk. The sepals measure 0.6 to 1.2 cm in length. The dark red to purple corolla measures up to approx. 5 cm in diameter and is bell-shaped. The corolla tube is densely hairy on the inside. The corolla lobes are about 1 × 1 cm in size, triangular and moderately to strongly curved outwards. The edges are slightly hairy and the lobes are covered with transverse wrinkles on the inside. The corona is brown to dark purple. The upright, interstaminal side lobes are deeply divided and narrow apically. The staminal side lobes are free, upright and up to about 9 mm long. They are rectangular and dorsoventrally flattened and basally elongated like a wing on the back. The apical process is very thin. The pollinium is broadly oval and measures 0.8 × 0.6 mm.

Its flower mimics the smell, color, and texture of decaying flesh to attract flies to lay their eggs on its corolla as a form of pollination.The fruits stand individually and grow up to 15 cm long.

== Distribution ==
It is native to KwaZulu-Natal province and the Northern Provinces of South Africa, and to Eswatini. Its natural habitats are subtropical or tropical dry shrubland and rocky areas.

== Gallery ==
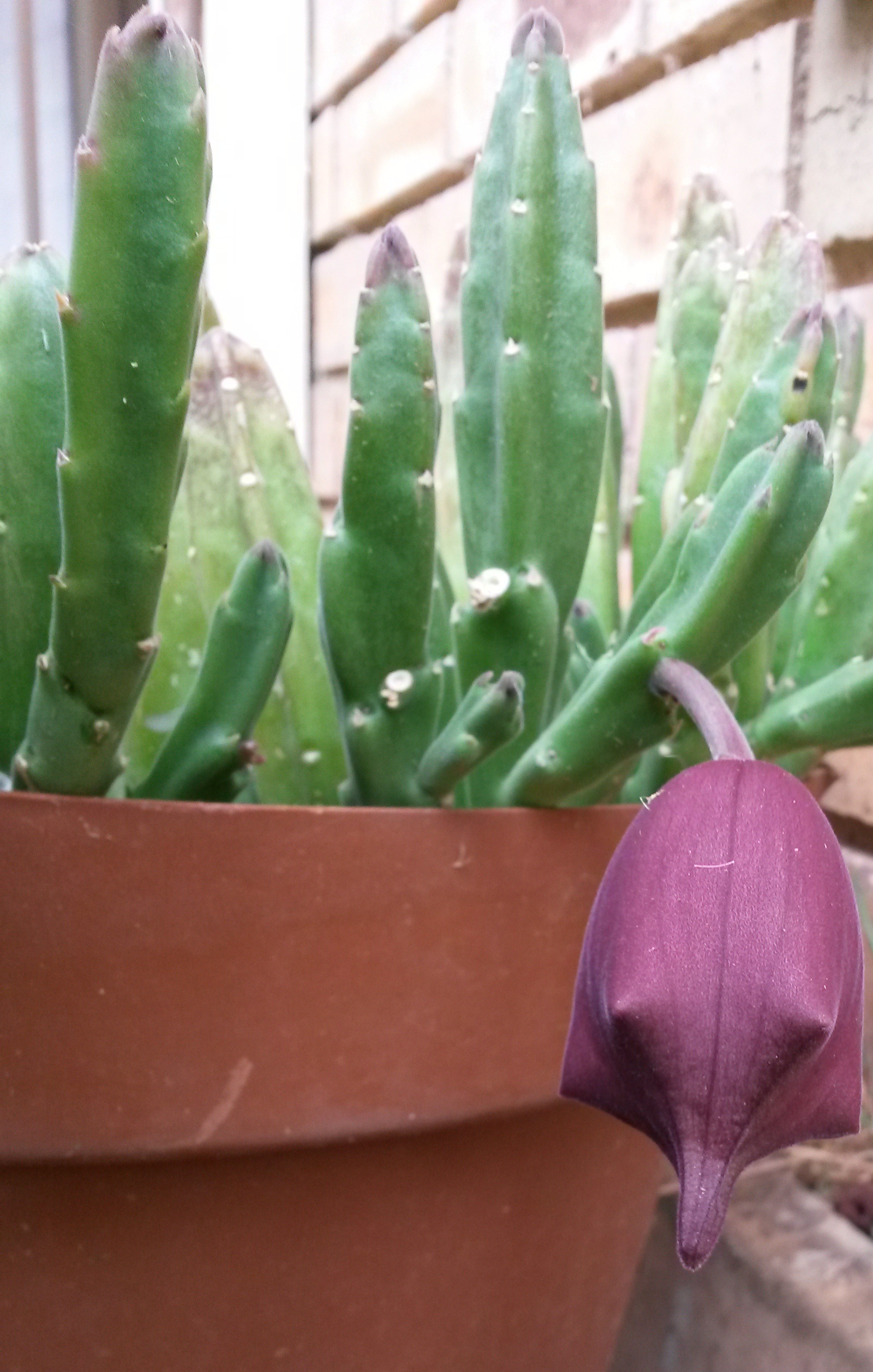
The flower buds of Stapelia leendertziae

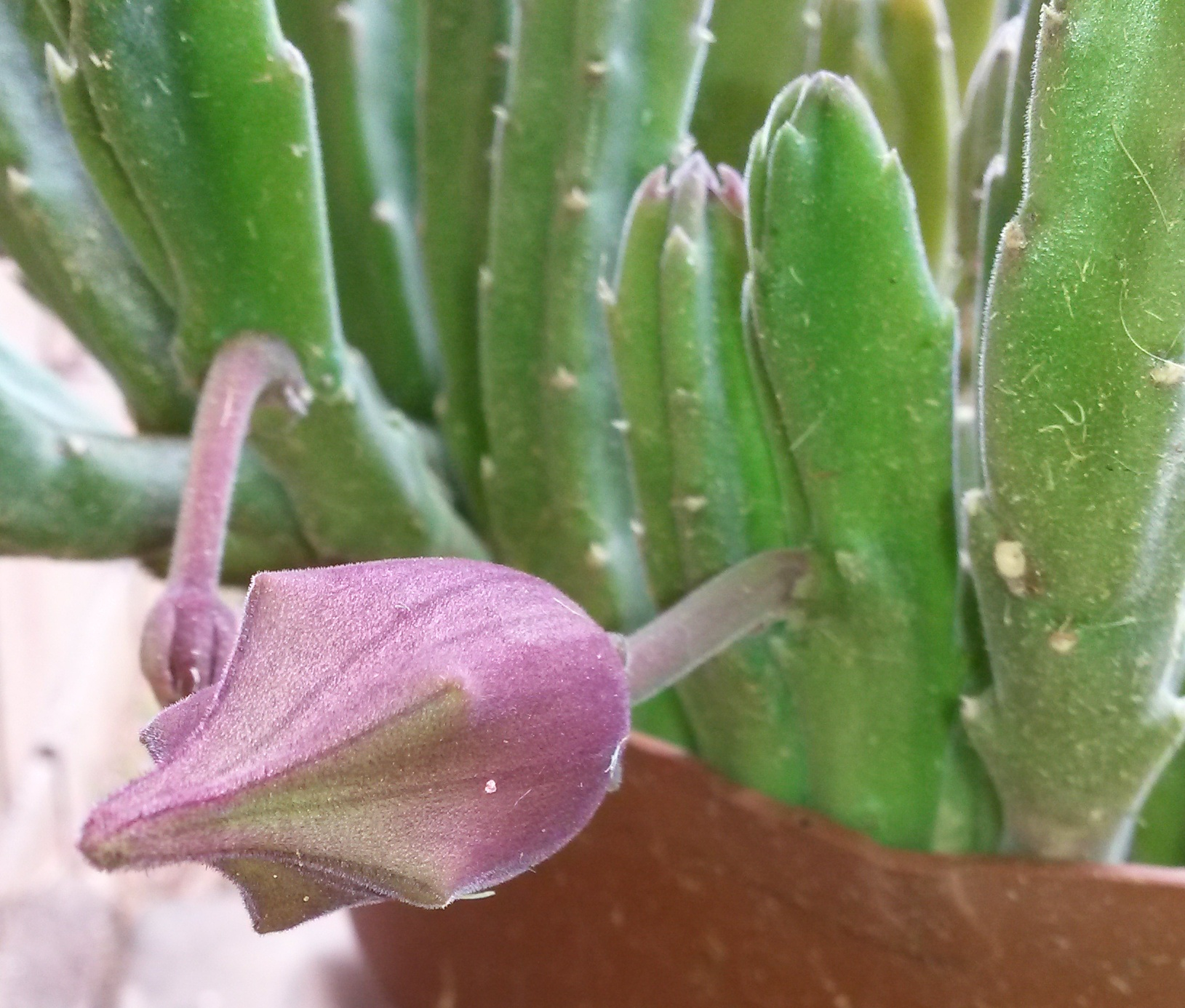
The flower buds of Stapelia leendertziae
