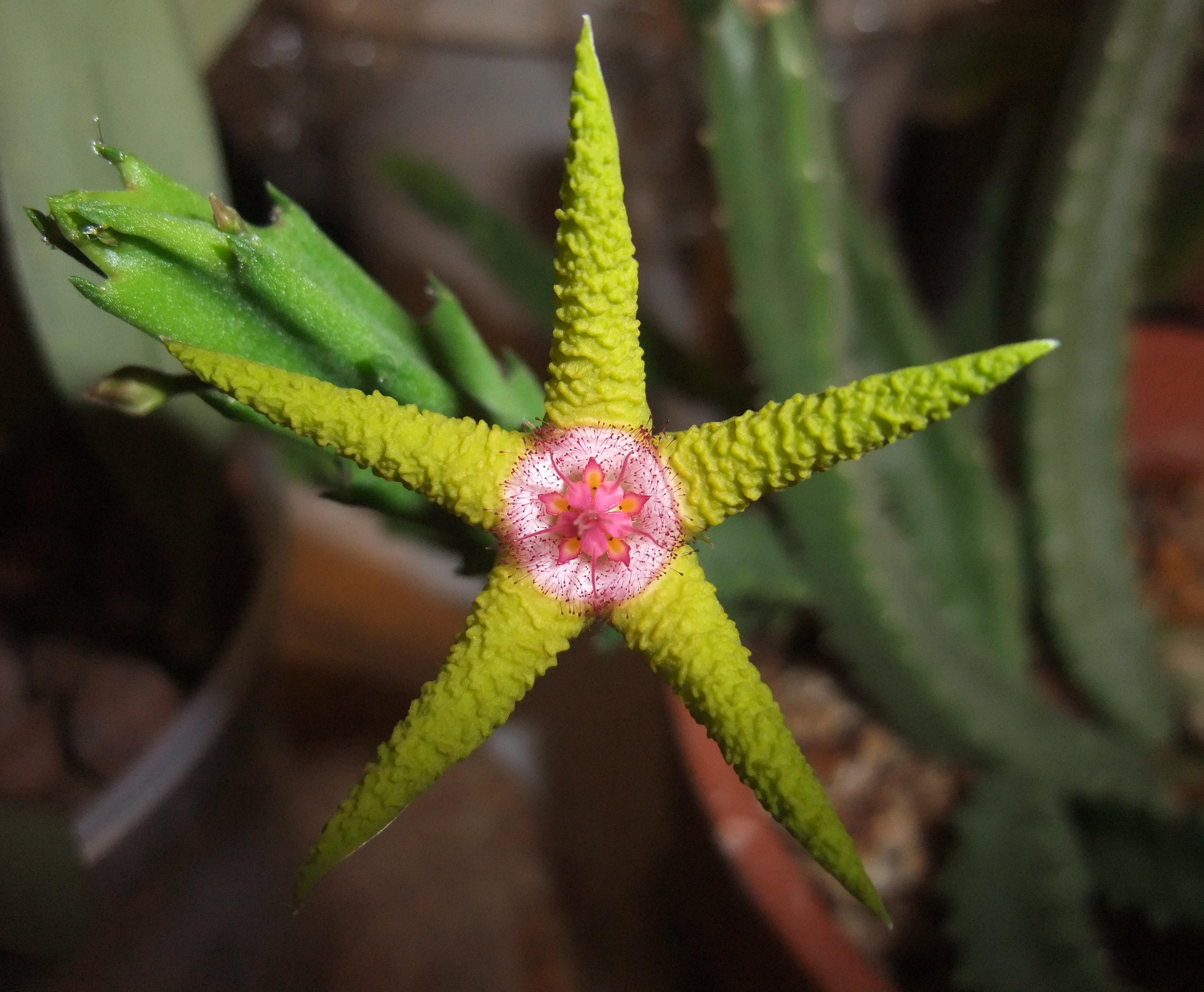
- A flower of S. flavopurpurea

Scientific classification
- Kingdom: Plantae
- Clade: Tracheophytes
- Clade: Angiosperms
- Clade: Eudicots
- Clade: Asterids
- Order: Gentianales
- Family: Apocynaceae
- Genus: Stapelia
- Species: S. flavopurpurea

Binomial name
- Stapelia flavopurpurea Marloth

Synonyms
- Homotypic Synonyms: Ceropegia flavopurpurea (Marloth) Bruyns; Gonostemon flavopurpureus (Marloth) P.V.Heath; Heterotypic Synonyms: Gonostemon flavopurpureus var. fleckii (A.Berger & Schltr.) P.V.Heath in Calyx 3: 8 (1993); Stapelia flavopurpurea var. fleckii (A.Berger & Schltr.) A.C.White & B.Sloane; Stapelia fleckii A.Berger & Schltr.

= Stapelia flavopurpurea =

Species of plant

Stapelia flavopurpurea is a species of flowering plant in the family Apocynaceae. It is endemic to Namibia. The flowers produced by the plant are quite unusual. They range from a bright yellow to greenish color and smell of beeswax.
