= Stem succulent =

Columnar succulent

Hoodia macrantha

Stem succulents are fleshy succulent columnar shaped plants which conduct photosynthesis mainly through their stems rather than their leaves. These plants are defined by their succulent stems and have evolved to have similar forms by convergent evolution to occupy similar niches.

== Description ==
Stem succulents are succulent plants defined by their succulent stems, which function to store water and conduct photosynthesis. These plants, like many others native to hot desert regions, undergo CAM photosynthesis, an alternative metabolic pathway where the plants' stomata open to exchange gasses and fix CO_{2} almost exclusively at night. Their leaves are absent or highly reduced, instead forming protective spines or thorns to deter herbivores and collect drip condensed water vapor at night.

Stem succulents are related by form, but not by evolution. They evolved to have similar forms and physiological characteristics by convergent evolution. Examples are tall thin Euphorbias from deserts and arid regions of southern African and Madagascar, similarly shaped cacti from North America and South America, which occupy a similar xeric evolutionary niche, and members of two genera of the family Asclepiadaceae (Hoodia and Stapelia).
