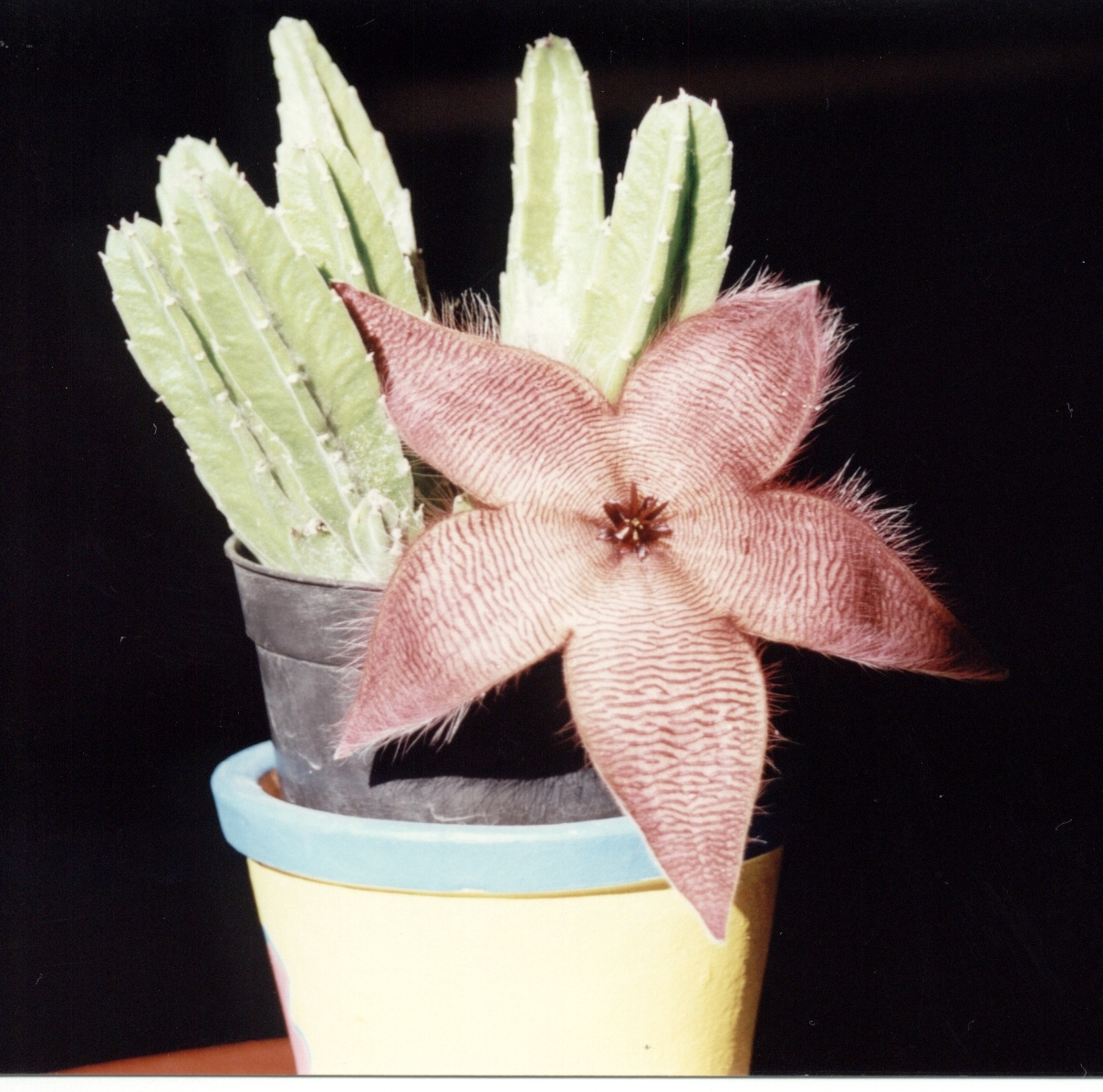

Scientific classification
- Kingdom: Plantae
- Clade: Tracheophytes
- Clade: Angiosperms
- Clade: Eudicots
- Clade: Asterids
- Order: Gentianales
- Family: Apocynaceae
- Genus: Stapelia
- Species: S. hirsuta

Binomial name
- Stapelia hirsuta L.

= Stapelia hirsuta =

Species of flowering plant

Stapelia hirsuta, common name starfish flower or carrion plant, is a species of flowering plant belonging to the family Apocynaceae.

== Name and synonyms ==
The genus epithet Stapelia was named in honour of Johannes van Stapel, who described the first plant discovered, while the Latin species name hirsuta means "hairy”.

Synonyms
- Tridentea depressa Haw. ex Schult.
- Stissera patula Kuntze
- Stissera hirsuta Kuntze
- Stissera depressa Kuntze
- Stapelia unguipetala N. E. Br.
- Stapelia sororia Jacq.
- Stapelia patula var. longirostris
- Stapelia patula Willd.
- Stapelia patentirostris N. E. Br.
- Stapelia lanigera Loudon
- Stapelia hirsuta var. unguipetala (N. E. Br.) N. E. Br.
- Stapelia hirsuta var. patula (Willd.) N. E. Br.
- Stapelia hirsuta var. lutea N. E. Br.
- Stapelia hirsuta var. longirostris (N. E. Br.) N. E. Br.
- Stapelia hirsuta var. grata N. E. Br.
- Stapelia hirsuta var. depressa (Jacq.) N. E. Br.
- Stapelia hirsuta var. comata (Jacq.) N. E. Br.
- Stapelia hirsuta var. affinis (N. E. Br.) N. E. Br.
- Stapelia elongata Sweet
- Stapelia depressa Jacq.
- Stapelia comata Jacq.
- Stapelia affinis N. E. Br.
- Gonostemon hirsutus var. luteus (N. E. Br.) P.V. Heath
- Gonostemon hirsutus var. longirostris (N. E. Br.) P.V. Heath
- Gonostemon hirsutus var. gratus (N. E. Br.) P.V. Heath
- Gonostemon hirsutus var. depressus (Jacq.) P.V. Heath
- Gonostemon hirsutus var. comatus (Jacq.) P.V. Heath
- Gonostemon hirsutus var. affinis (N. E. Br.) P.V. Heath
- Gonostemon hirsutus (L.) P.V. Heath

== Description ==
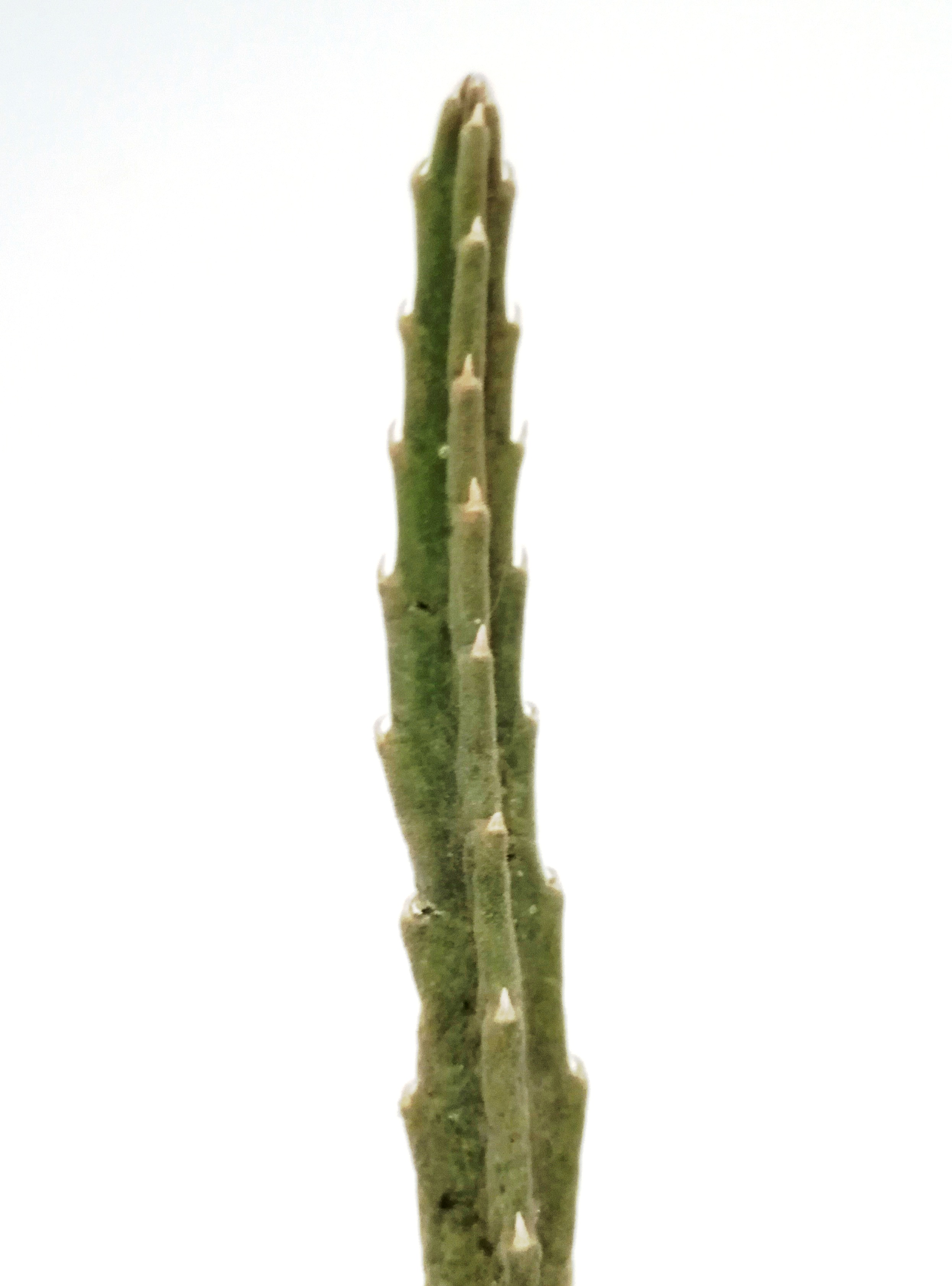
Stem showing the characteristic concave grooves between the four angles

Stapelia hirsuta stems are subquadrangular in cross-section, about 20 centimetres (7.9 in) high, and 1 centimetre (0.39 in) to 2 centimetres (0.79 in) thick. Concave groves run vertically along the stems, between their four angles. This feature can sometimes help to distinguish S. hirsuta from many other Stapelia species with which it naturally co-occurs (e.g. Stapelia rufa, Stapelia engleriana) that typically have stems which are also subquadrangular, but which are more rounded in cross-section. The surface of S.hirsuta stems are also usually shortly pubescent. Leaf rudiments are 1-2mm long. Populations growing on sandstones can be glabrous stemmed, stemmed with purple mottling.

=== Flowers ===
The flowers are flat, very hairy, dark-red and resemble rotting meat. Corolla can reach a width of about 5–15 centimetres (2.0–5.9 in). The carrion smell serve to attract various pollinators, especially flies. The flowering period extends from late summer through late autumn.

== Subspecies ==
This species is extremely variable with various subspecies and many hybrids.

- Stapelia hirsuta baylissii
- Stapelia hirsuta gariepensis
- Stapelia hirsuta tsomoensis
- Stapelia hirsuta vetula

== Distribution and habitat ==
This species is endemic to South Africa and southern Namibia.

Its wide distribution extends along the southern edge of the arid Karoo region, throughout the "Little Karoo" in the southern Cape, as far west as the Robertson Karoo and the Swartland just outside Cape Town. It can be found in the mainly winter rainfall areas, in the far west of South Africa, northwards through the Namaqualand region, as far north as southern Namibia. It is absent from the interior of South Africa.

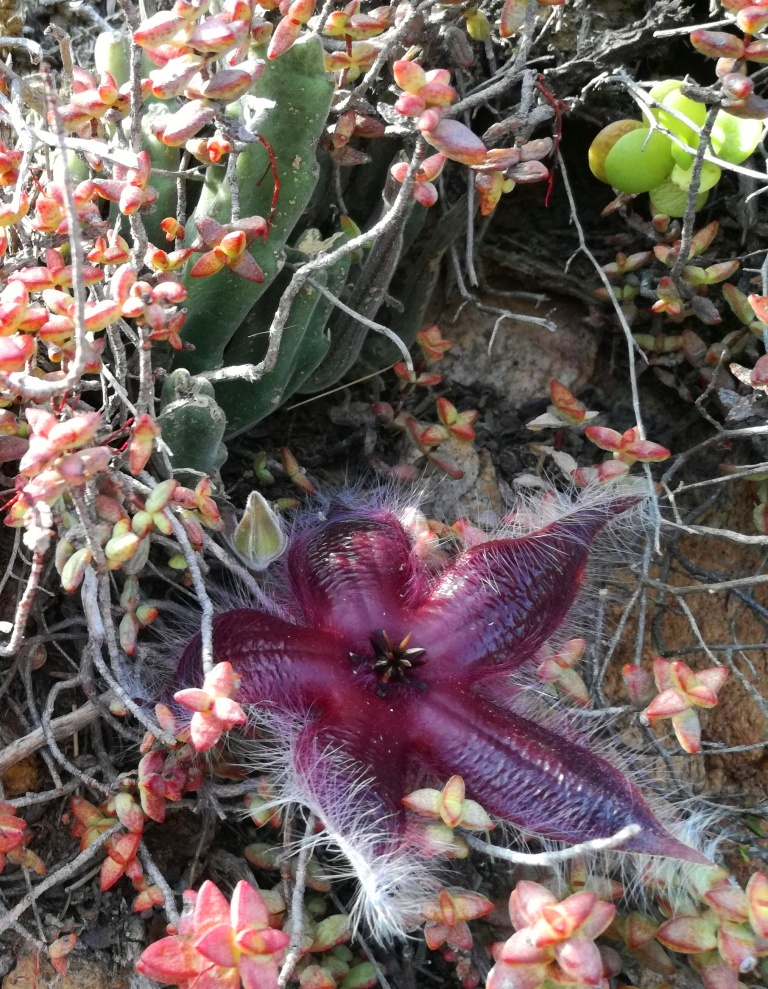

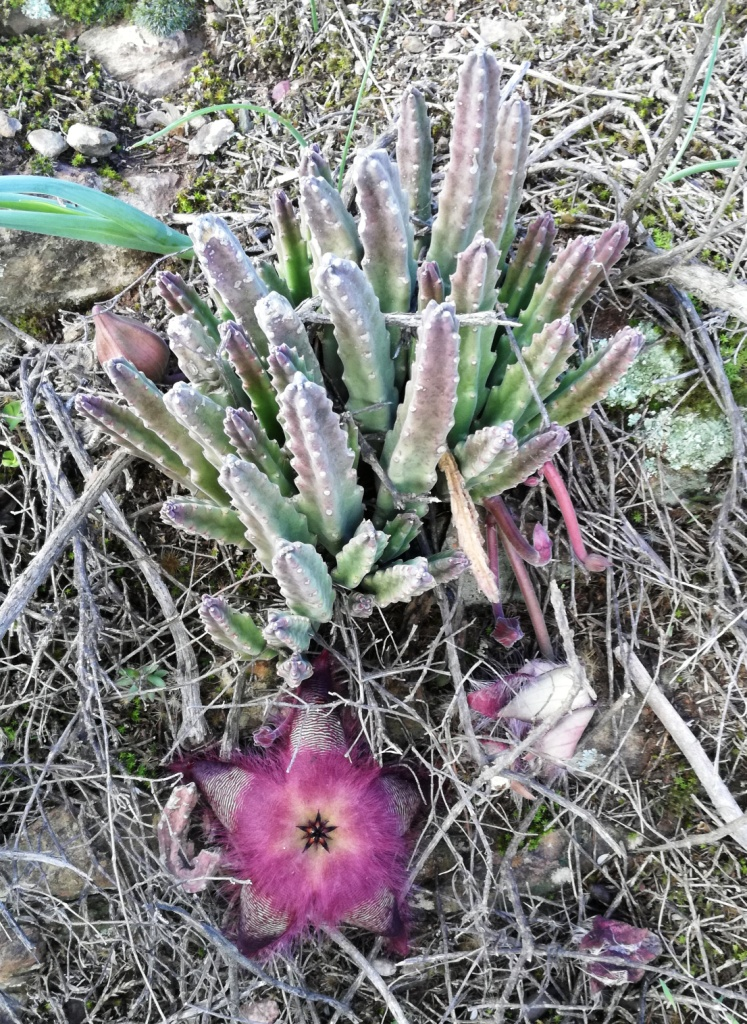

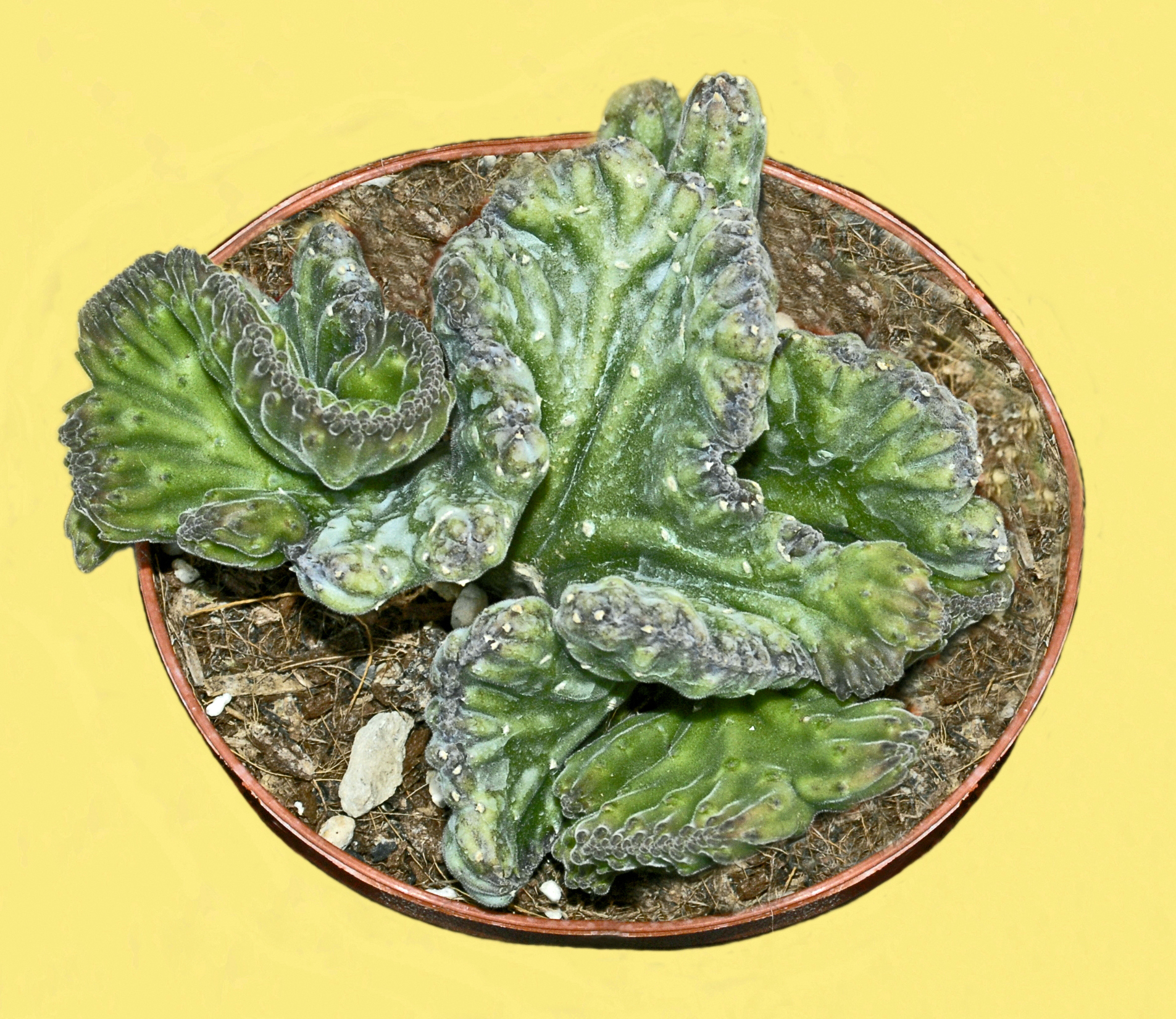
S. hirsuta 'Crestata'
