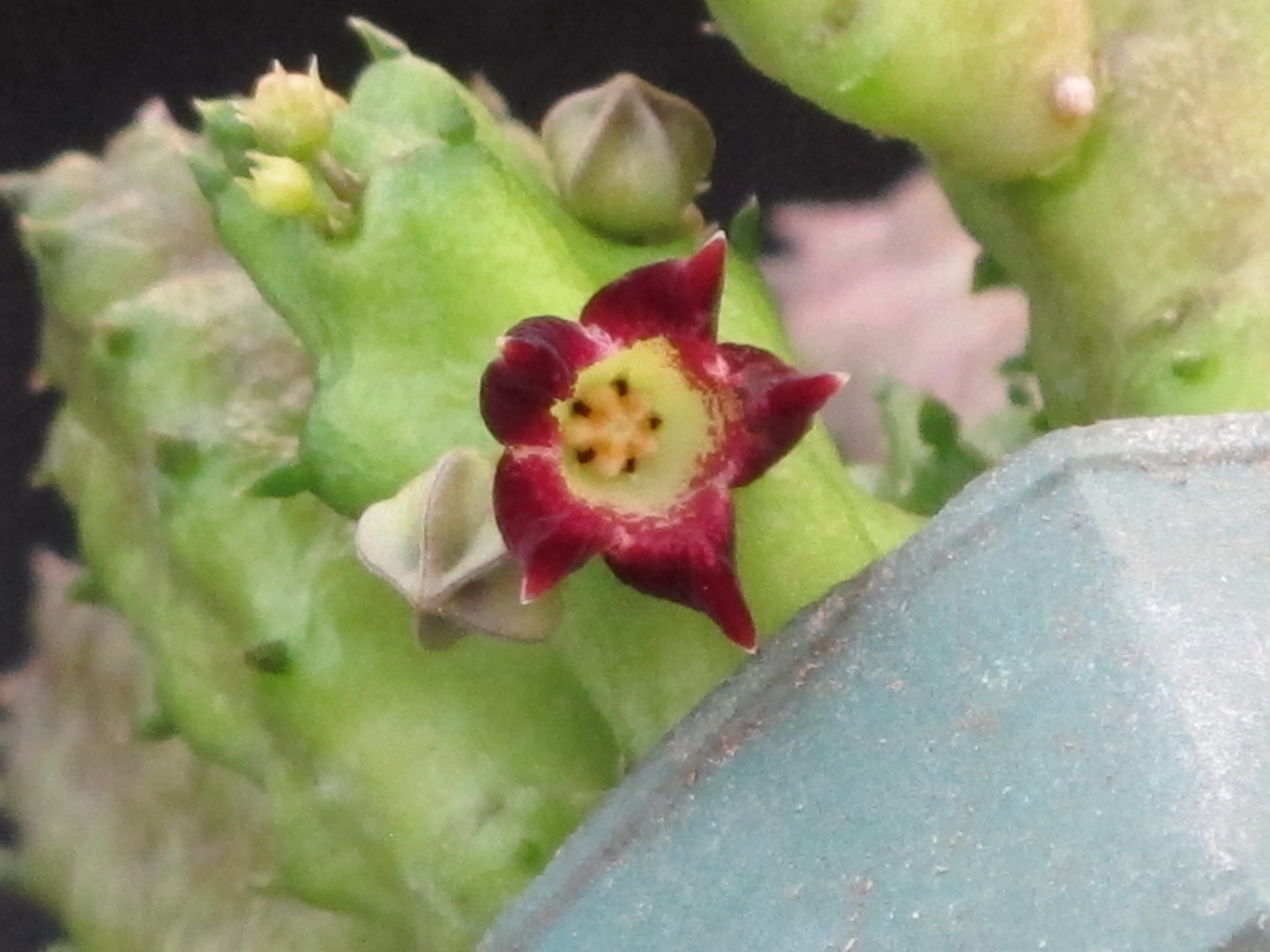

Conservation status
- Least Concern (IUCN 3.1)

Scientific classification
- Kingdom: Plantae
- Clade: Tracheophytes
- Clade: Angiosperms
- Clade: Eudicots
- Clade: Asterids
- Order: Gentianales
- Family: Apocynaceae
- Subfamily: Asclepiadoideae
- Tribe: Ceropegieae
- Genus: Baynesia; Bruyns
- Species: B. lophophora

Binomial name
- Baynesia lophophora Bruyns

Synonyms
- Ceropegia lophophora (Bruyns) Bruyns

= Baynesia =

Species of plant

Baynesia is a genus of flowering plants in the family Apocynaceae. Its only species is Baynesia lophophora, endemic to Namibia. It was first discovered by Peter Bruyns in 1999, and first described by him in 2000.
