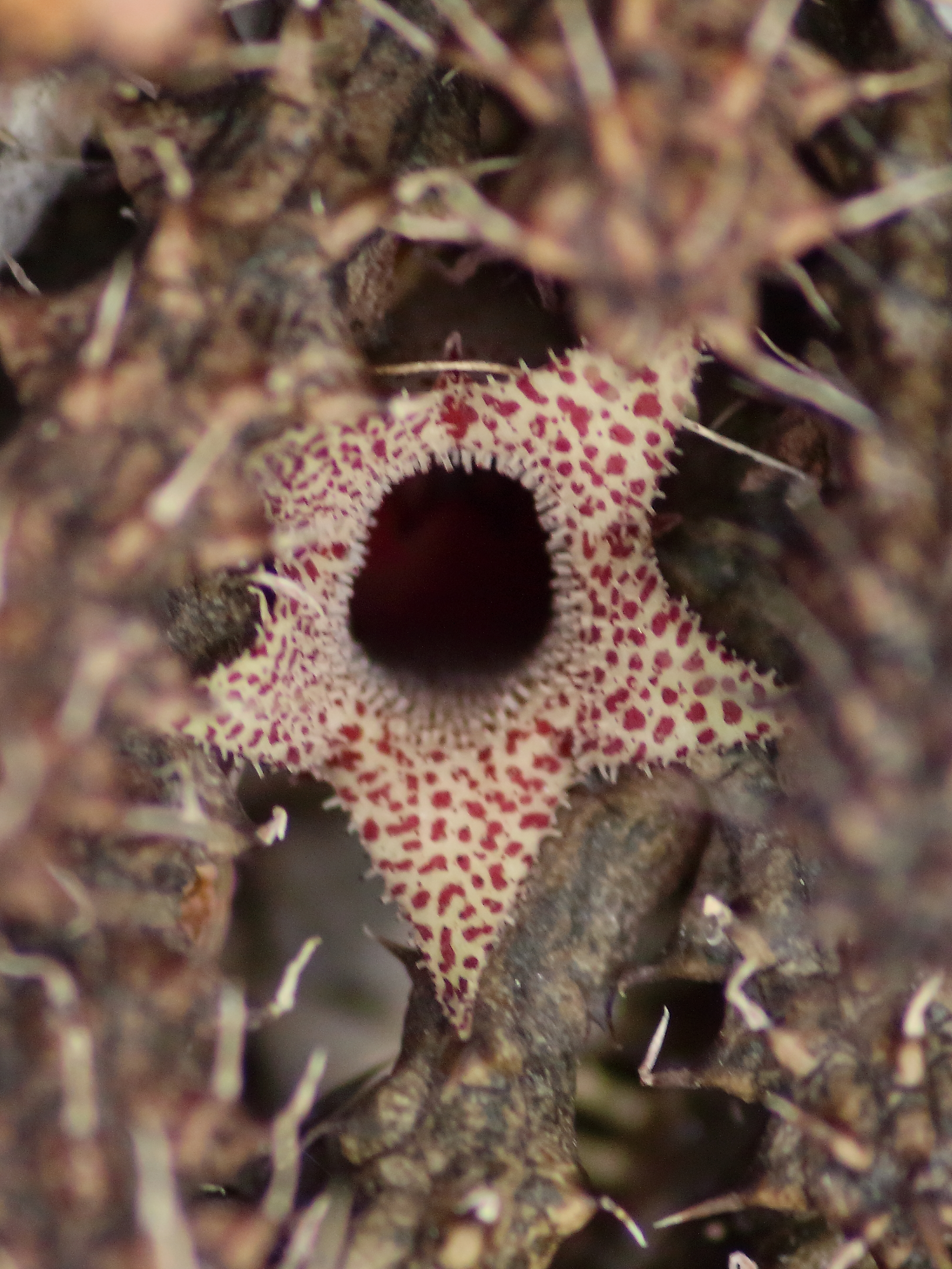
- Stapelianthus decaryi

Scientific classification
- Kingdom: Plantae
- Clade: Tracheophytes
- Clade: Angiosperms
- Clade: Eudicots
- Clade: Asterids
- Order: Gentianales
- Family: Apocynaceae
- Subfamily: Asclepiadoideae
- Tribe: Ceropegieae
- Genus: Stapelianthus; Choux ex A.C.White & B.Sloane

Synonyms
- Stapeliopsis Choux non Pillans

= Stapelianthus =

Genus of plants

Stapelianthus is a genus of flowering plants in the family Apocynaceae, first described as a genus in 1933. The entire genus is endemic to Madagascar and is concentrated in the far south of the island.

The genus is defined by the unique corona structure of its flowers.

== Species ==
Species accepted by the Plants of the World Online as of January 2023

- Stapelianthus arenarius Bosser & Morat
- Stapelianthus decaryi Choux
- Stapelianthus insignis Desc.
- Stapelianthus keraudreniae Bosser & Morat
- Stapelianthus madagascariensis (Choux) A.C.White & B.Sloane
- Stapelianthus montagnacii (Boiteau) Boiteau & Bertrand
- Stapelianthus pilosus Lavranos & D.S.H

formerly included

1. Stapelianthus baylissii, syn of Tridentea baylissii
2. Stapelianthus choananthus, syn of Tridentea choanantha

Taxonomy

The species are extremely close to each other genetically, however the genus overall is very divergent from its relatives on the mainland.

Phylogenetic studies have shown the genus to be most closely related to a large and widespread branch of stapeliads from mainland Africa, comprising the genera Huernia, Tavaresia and a mixed sub-branch including Orbea, Piaranthus and Stapelia.
