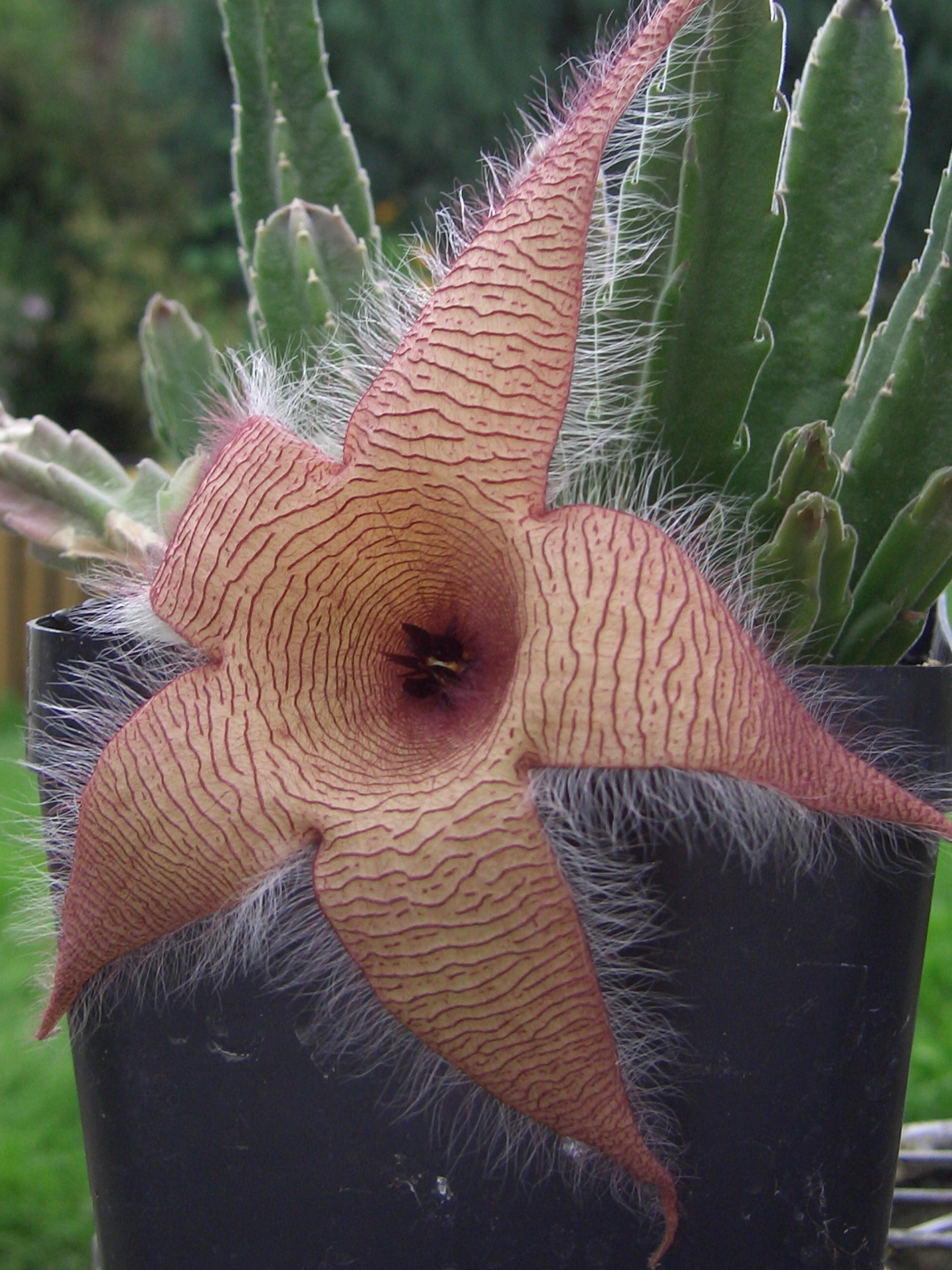
- Stapelia gigantea

Scientific classification
- Kingdom: Plantae
- Clade: Tracheophytes
- Clade: Angiosperms
- Clade: Eudicots
- Clade: Asterids
- Order: Gentianales
- Family: Apocynaceae
- Subfamily: Asclepiadoideae
- Tribe: Ceropegieae
- Genus: Stapelia; L.

Type species
- Stapelia hirsuta L.

Synonyms
- × Gonostapelia P.V.Heath (1992); Gonostemma Spreng. (1830), orth. var.; Gonostemon Haw. (1812); Stisseria Heist. ex Fabr. (1759), nom. superfl.

= Stapelia =

Carrion flowers

Genus of plants

Stapelia is a genus of low-growing, spineless, stem succulent plants, predominantly from South Africa with a few from other parts of Africa. Several Asian and Latin American species were formerly included but they have all now been transferred to other genera. The flowers of certain species, most notably Stapelia gigantea, can reach 41 cm (16 inches) in diameter when fully open. Most Stapelia flowers are visibly hairy and generate the odor of rotten flesh when they bloom.

== Description ==
The hairy, oddly textured and coloured appearance of many Stapelia flowers has been claimed to resemble that of rotting meat, and this, coupled with their odour, has earned the most commonly grown members of the genus Stapelia the common name of carrion flowers. A notable exception is the sweetly scented Stapelia flavopurpurea. Such odours serve to attract various specialist pollinators including, in the case of carrion-scented blooms, blow flies of the dipteran family Calliphoridae. They frequently lay eggs around the coronae of Stapelia flowers, convinced by the plants' deception.

== Cultivation ==
A handful of species are commonly cultivated as potted plants and are even used as rockery plants in countries where the climate permits. Stapelia are good container plants and can grow well under full sun and light to moderate watering. They should be planted in well-drained compost as the stems are prone to rotting if kept moist for long.

== Species ==
32 species are accepted:

1. Stapelia acuminata Masson – South Africa
2. Stapelia arenosa C.A.Lückh. – Cape Province
3. Stapelia asterias Masson – South Africa
4. Stapelia cedrimontana Frandsen – Cape Province
5. Stapelia clavicorona I.Verd. – Transvaal
6. Stapelia concinna Masson – South Africa
7. Stapelia divaricata Masson – South Africa
8. Stapelia engleriana Schltr. – tropical Africa
9. Stapelia erectiflora N.E.Br. – South Africa
10. Stapelia flavopurpurea Marloth – South Africa
11. Stapelia gettliffei R.Pott – Transvaal
12. Stapelia gigantea N.E.Br. – KwaZulu-Natal
13. Stapelia glanduliflora Masson – South Africa
14. Stapelia grandiflora Masson – South Africa
15. Stapelia hirsuta L. – South Africa
16. Stapelia kwebensis N.E.Br. – Botswana
17. Stapelia leendertziae N.E.Br. – South Africa
18. Stapelia × meintjiesii I.Verd. –
19. Stapelia obducta L.C.Leach – Cape Province
20. Stapelia olivacea N.E.Br. – South Africa
21. Stapelia paniculata Willd. – South Africa
22. Stapelia parvula Kers – Angola
23. Stapelia pearsonii N.E.Br. – Great Namaqualand
24. Stapelia pillansii N.E.Br. – South Africa
25. Stapelia remota R.A.Dyer – Namibia
26. Stapelia rubiginosa Nel – Little Namaqualand
27. Stapelia rufa Masson – South Africa
28. Stapelia schinzii A.Berger & Schltr. – Namibia
29. Stapelia similis N.E.Br. – Little Namaqualand
30. Stapelia surrecta N.E.Br. – Cape Province
31. Stapelia unicornis C.A.Lückh. – Eswatini
32. Stapelia villetiae C.A.Lückh. – Cape Province

Unplaced names

- Stapelia × dejecta Salm-Dyck
- Stapelia fuscopurpurea N.E.Br.
- Stapelia × massonii Haw.
- Stapelia × multiflora DC.
- Stapelia × multiflora Rüst
- Stapelia × plantii Hook.f.

Species formerly included

now transferred to other genera (Angolluma, Brachystelma, Caralluma, Duvalia, Echidnopsis, Gonolobus, Hoodia, Hoya, Huernia, Monolluma, Orbea, Orbeopsis, Pachycymbium, Piaranthus, Quaqua, Stapelianthus, Tromotriche, Tridentea, Triplosperma)

1. S. adscendens now Caralluma adscendens
2. S. albipilosa now Tridentea marientalensis subsp. albipilosa
3. S. albocastanea now Orbeopsis albocastanea
4. S. anemoniflora now Duvalia anemoniflora
5. S. ango now Caralluma ango
6. S. anguinea now Orbea variegata
7. S. aperta now Tridentea aperta
8. S. arida now Quaqua arida
9. S. articulata now Pectinaria articulata
10. S. atropurpurea now Orbea variegata
11. S. atrosanguinea now Piaranthus atrosanguineus
12. S. auobensis now Tridentea marientalensis
13. S. ausana now Tridentea jucunda var. dinteri
14. S. barbata now Huernia barbata
15. S. bisulca now Orbea variegata
16. S. bufonia now Orbea variegata
17. S. campanulata now Huernia campanulata
18. S. caudata now Ceropegia spathulata
19. S. chinensis now Hoya carnosa
20. S. choanantha now Tridentea choanantha
21. S. chrysostephana now Angolluma chrysostephana
22. S. ciliata now Orbea ciliata
23. S. cincta now Tridentea jucunda var. cincta
24. S. clavata now Trichocaulon clavatum
25. S. clavigera now Huernia clavigera
26. S. clypeata now Orbea variegata
27. S. cochinchinensis now Triplosperma cochinchinensis
28. S. compacta now Duvalia caespitosa var. compacta
29. S. concolor now Duvalia caespitosa
30. S. conspurcata now Orbea variegata
31. S. cooperi now Orbea cooperi
32. S. corderoyi now Duvalia corderoyi
33. S. curtisii now Orbea variegata
34. S. decaisneana now Pachycymbium decaisneanum
35. S. decora now Piaranthus germinatus subsp. decorus
36. S. deflexa now Orbea variegata
37. S. dinteri now Tridentea jucunda var. dinteri
38. S. dummeri now Orbea dummeri
39. S. dwequensis now Tridentea dwequensis
40. S. elegans now Duvalia elegans
41. S. europaea now Caralluma europaea
42. S. fucosa now Orbea verrucosa var. fucosa
43. S. furcata now Orbeopsis melanantha
44. S. fuscata Jacq. now Tromotriche revolut
45. S. geminata now Piaranthus geminatus
46. S. gemmiflora now Tridentea gemmiflora
47. S. gettleffii now Gonostemon gettliffei
48. S. glauca now Tromotriche revoluta
49. S. gordonii now Hoodia gordonii
50. S. gussoneana now Caralluma europaea
51. S. guttata now Huernia guttata
52. S. herrei now Tridentea herrei
53. S. hircosa now Tridentea gemmiflora
54. S. hirtella now Duvalia caespitosa
55. S. incarnata now Quaqua incarnata
56. S. irrorata now Orbea irrorata
57. S. jacquiniana now Duvalia elegans
58. S. jucunda now Tridentea jucunda
59. S. knobelii now Orbeopsis knobelii
60. S. laevis now Tromotriche pedunculata
61. S. lepida now Orbea lepida
62. S. longidens now Orbea longidens
63. S. longii now Tridentea longii
64. S. longipes now Tromotriche longipes
65. S. macloughlinii now Orbea macloughlinii
66. S. × maculosa now Orbea × maculosa
67. S. mammillaris now Quaqua mammillaris
68. S. marginata now Orbea variegata
69. S. marientalensis now Tridentea marientalensis
70. S. marmorata now Orbea variegata
71. S. mastodes now Duvalia caespitosa var. compacta
72. S. melanantha now Orbeopsis melanantha
73. S. mixta now Orbea variegata
74. S. montagnacii now Stapelianthus montagnacii
75. S. multangula now Echidnopsis multangula
76. S. namaquensis now Orbea namaquensis
77. S. neliana now Tridentea herrei
78. S. normalis now Orbea variegata
79. S. obliqua now Orbea variegata
80. S. ocellata now Huernia ocellata
81. S. orbicularis now Orbea variegata
82. S. pachyrrhiza now Tridentea pachyrrhiza
83. S. pancololote now Gonolobus pancololote
84. S. parviflora now Quaqua parviflora
85. S. parvipuncta now Tridentea parvipuncta
86. S. peculiaris now Tridentea peculiaris
87. S. pedunculata now Tridentea pedunculata
88. S. picta now Orbea variegata
89. S. pilifera now Hoodia pilifera
90. S. planiflora now Orbea variegata
91. S. prognatha now Orbea prognatha
92. S. pruinosa now Quaqua pruinosa
93. S. pulchella now Orbea pulchella
94. S. pulchra now Orbea verrucosa
95. S. pulla now Piaranthus pullus
96. S. punctata now Gonolobus luteus
97. S. quadrangula now Monolluma quadrangula
98. S. quinquenervis now Orbea variegata
99. S. radiata now Duvalia caespitosa
100. S. ramosa now Quaqua ramosa
101. S. reclinata now Duvalia caespitosa var. caespitosa
102. S. replicata now Duvalia caespitosa var. caespitosa
103. S. reticulata now Huernia reticulata
104. S. retusa now Orbea variegata
105. S. revoluta now Tromotriche revoluta
106. S. rogersii now Angolluma rogersii
107. S. roriflua now Orbea verrucosa
108. S. rugosa J.C.Wendl. now Orbea verrucosa
109. S. rugosa Donn ex Jacq. now Orbea variegata
110. S. ruschiana now Tridentea ruschiana
111. S. semota now Orbea semota
112. S. serrulata now Piaranthus geminatus subsp. decorus
113. S. stygia now Tridentea gemmiflora
114. S. subulata now Caralluma subulata
115. S. tapscottii now Orbea tapscottii
116. S. thudichumii now Tromotriche thudichumii
117. S. tubata now Huernia tubata
118. S. tuberculata now Duvalia caespitosa var. caespitosa
119. S. tuberosa now Brachystelma tuberosum
120. S. umbonata now Tridentea pachyrrhiza
121. S. umbracula now Orbea umbracula
122. S. vaga now Orbea lutea subsp. vaga
123. S. variegata now Orbea variegata
124. S. venusta now Huernia venusta
125. S. verrucosa now Orbea verrucosa
126. S. virescens now Tridentea virescens
127. S. wendlandiana now Orbea wendlandiana
128. S. woodii now Orbea woodii
