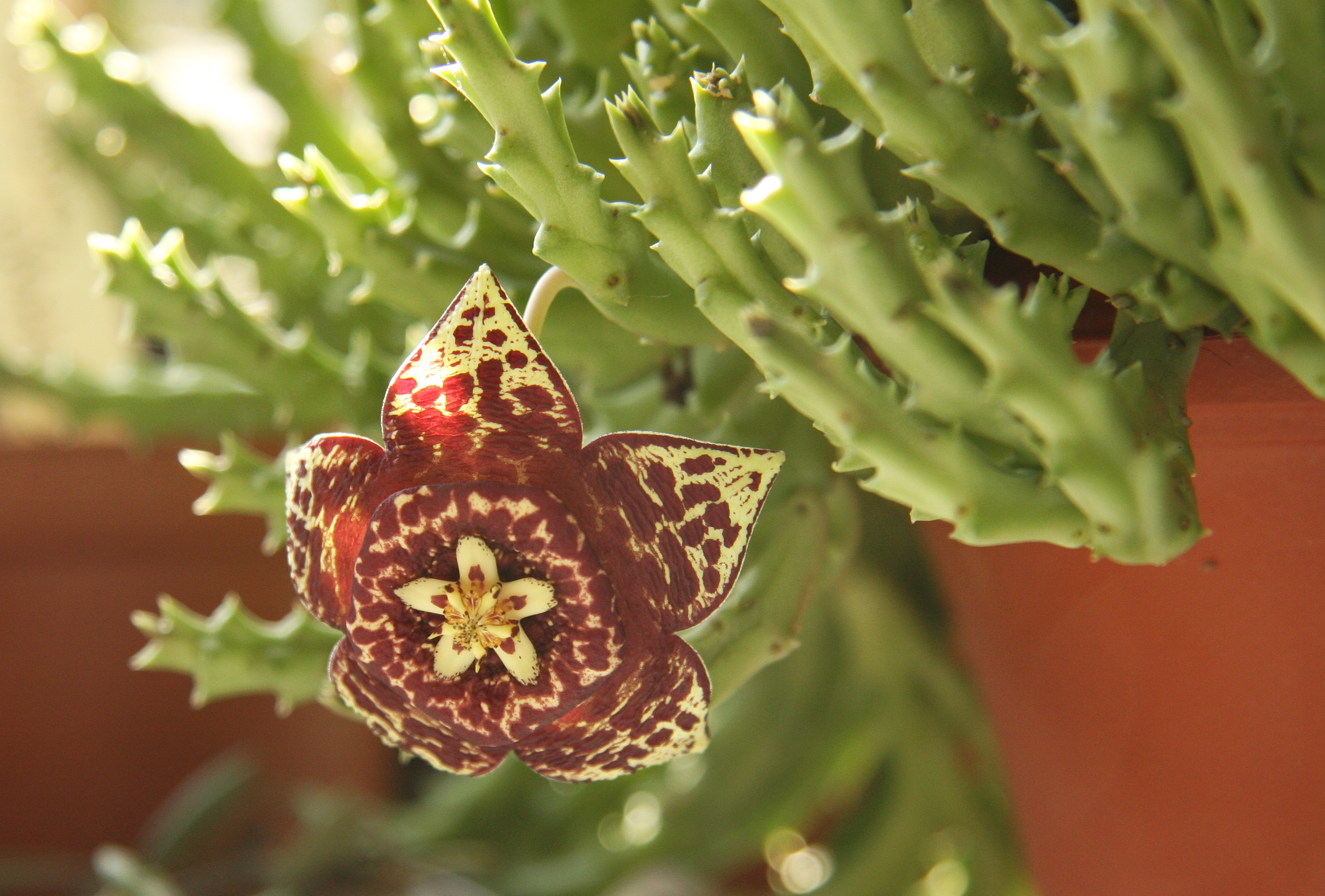

Scientific classification
- Kingdom: Plantae
- Clade: Tracheophytes
- Clade: Angiosperms
- Clade: Eudicots
- Clade: Asterids
- Order: Gentianales
- Family: Apocynaceae
- Genus: Orbea
- Species: O. variegata

Binomial name
- Orbea variegata (L.) Haw.

Synonyms
- Stapelia variegata L.; Stisseria variegata (L.) Kuntze

= Orbea variegata =

Species of flowering plant

Orbea variegata, also known as the star flower, carrion flower, starfish cactus and toad cactus, is a species of flowering plant in the family Apocynaceae that is native to the coastal belt of the Western Cape, South Africa, growing actively during the winter rainfall season. It is an invasive species in southern Australia.

== Description ==
Growing to 10 cm (3.9 in) tall by 50 cm (20 in) broad, it is a leafless succulent perennial with cactus-like toothed stems, and highly variable, star-shaped, off-white or yellow flowers strongly speckled with maroon, up to 8 cm (3.1 in) in diameter. The succulent, stocky or slender shoots lie at the base and then ascend, or stand upright, forming small clumps with a diameter of 5 to 20 cm, rarely up to one meter. The slender shoots grow to about 15 cm long or high with a diameter of about 0.5 to 1 cm. Stocky shoots only grow to 4 to 5 cm high with a diameter of less than 1 cm. The shoots are green with purple spots. The warts are splayed and up to 3 to 9 mm, rarely up to 1.5 cm long. They are loosely arranged in four obtuse-angled ribs, each with a longitudinal groove between the ribs. The rudiments of stipules may be missing. The latex is colorless.

=== Inflorescences ===
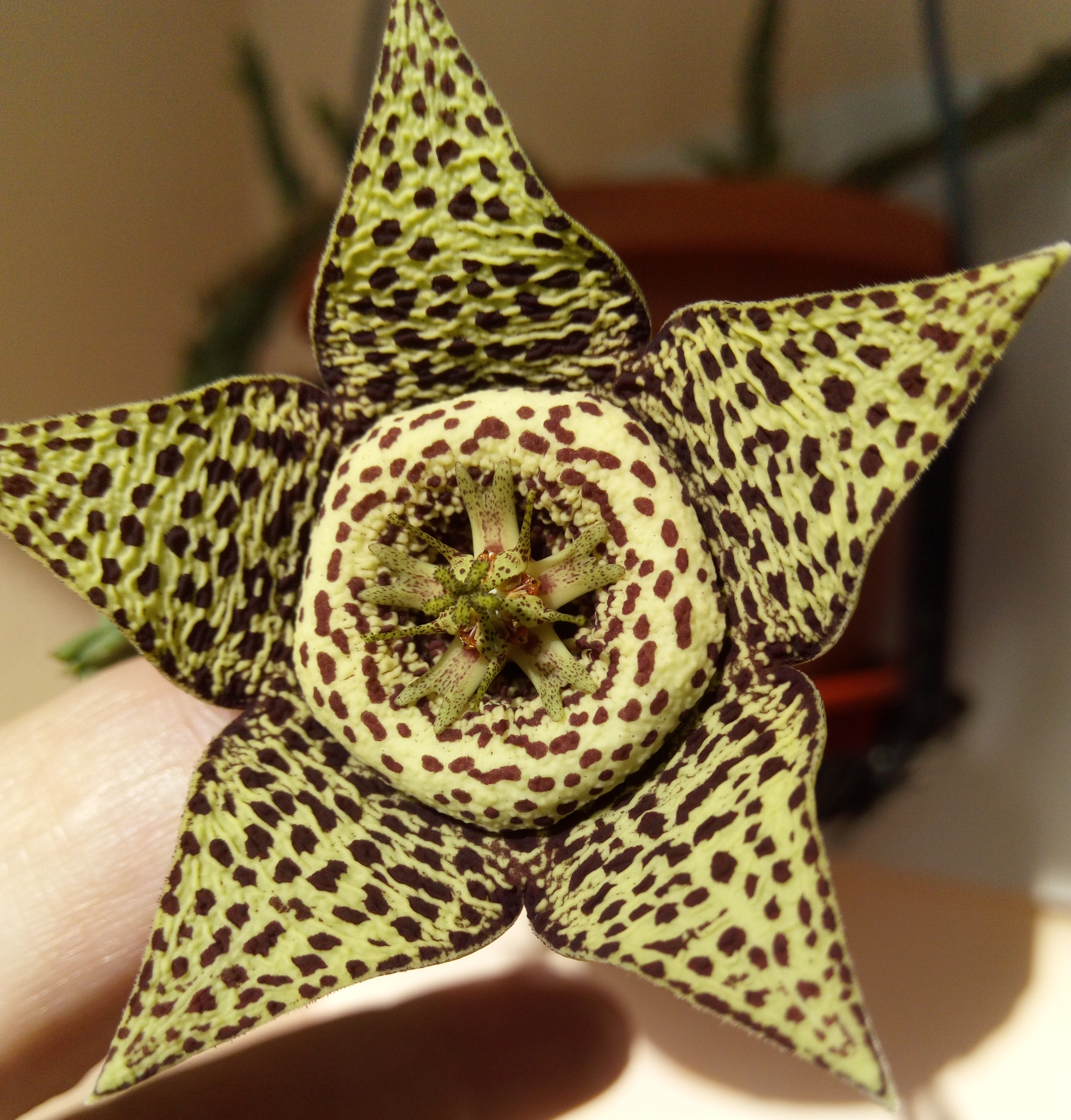
Flower

The flowers may show regular (banded) markings, or irregular ones. They have five pointed or blunt lobes surrounding a central, pentagonal annulus (corona). The flowers may have a faint carrion smell to attract potential insect pollinators. The inflorescence stem is 2 to 6 mm long and 0.2 to 0.3 mm in diameter. The inflorescence contains one to five flowers. The flower buds are elongated and pointed at the end, but also flat and rounded. The hermaphrodite flower is radially symmetrical and has five petals. The five sepals are about 9 mm long. The five petals are fused in a flat, basin-shaped manner, and the corolla has a diameter of 5 to 9 cm. The corolla is green on the outside, and the corolla lobes and venation are tinged with red. The inside of the corolla is pale greenish-yellow or light yellowish with a variable pattern of more or less large blackish-purple, crimson, or purple-brown spots and dots. The round or rounded-pentagonal annulus is usually lighter yellow and more finely patterned. The margin is recurved, the surface warty, and transversely wrinkled on the inside. The corolla tube encloses the corona. Flowering occurs from late summer to early fall.

The petal lobes are approximately triangular, flat-spreading, or slightly curved outwards, with a length of about 2.5 cm and a width of about 2.3 cm. The corona, which measures 6 to 7 mm in diameter, is pale yellow with dark purple dots, or dark purple. The interstaminal coronal lobes are deeply pocket-shaped, oblong-rectangular and up to half bifid or bidentate, as well as ascending and diverging. The staminal coronal lobes are 3 mm long and 1.2 mm wide and ovate-lanceolate in shape. They have thread-thin or subulate processes of approximately equal length at the base and upper end, which project beyond the style head at the upper end. The ends are club-shaped and curved outwards. There is a nectar cavity, the opening is teardrop-shaped. The pollinia are narrowly D-shaped, 0.8 mm wide and 0.5 mm high. The follicles are arranged in pairs, at an acute angle to each other, and upright. They are long, spindle-shaped with a smooth surface and up to 12 cm long

== Cultivation ==
This plant is popular in cultivation, and is often sold under its former name Stapelia variegata. It has many common names, including starfish plant, starfish cactus, carrion cactus, carrion flower, toad cactus, toad plant. It is not closely related to the true cactus family. When grown as an ornamental plant in temperate zones it requires protection, as it does not tolerate freezing temperatures. It is best grown under glass, in similar conditions to cacti.

In the UK it has gained the Royal Horticultural Society's Award of Garden Merit.

== Distribution ==
Native to southern Africa, it thrives at altitudes between 0 and about 1,000 meters. It grows on gently sloping, but rarely steep, rocky slopes, sometimes under bushes, but also in locations with more or less full sun exposure.

== Gallery ==
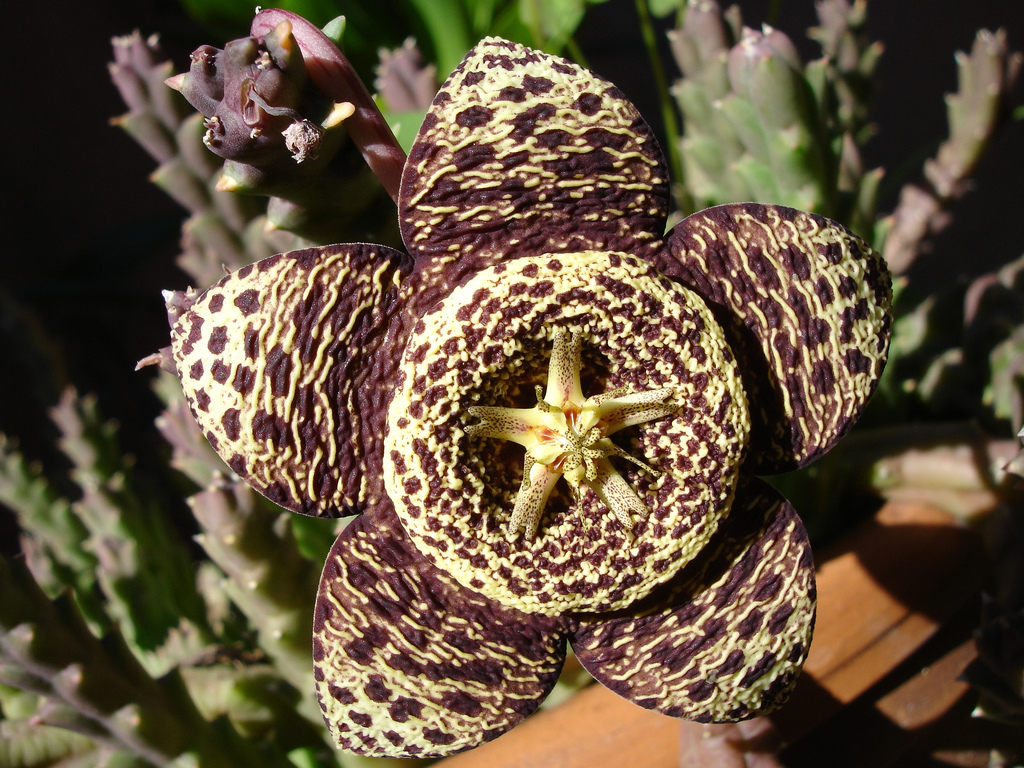
Flower showing regular markings

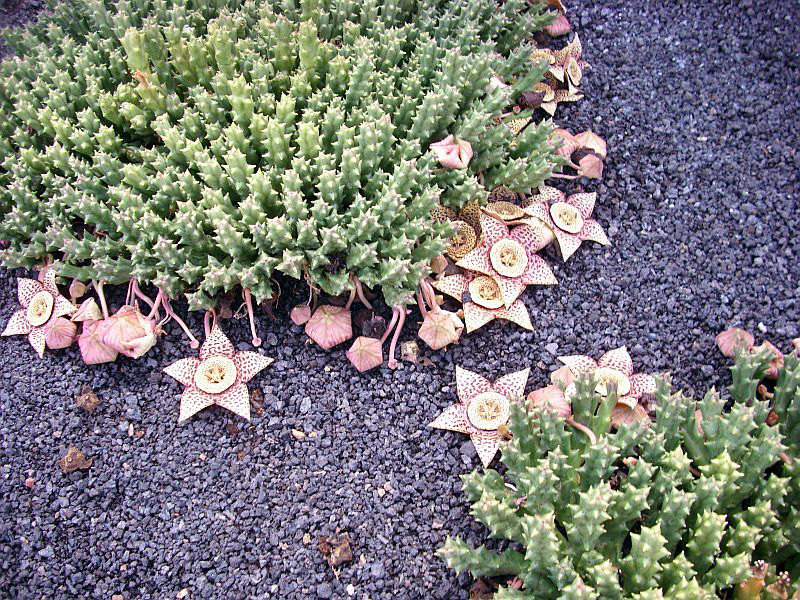
Mature colonies

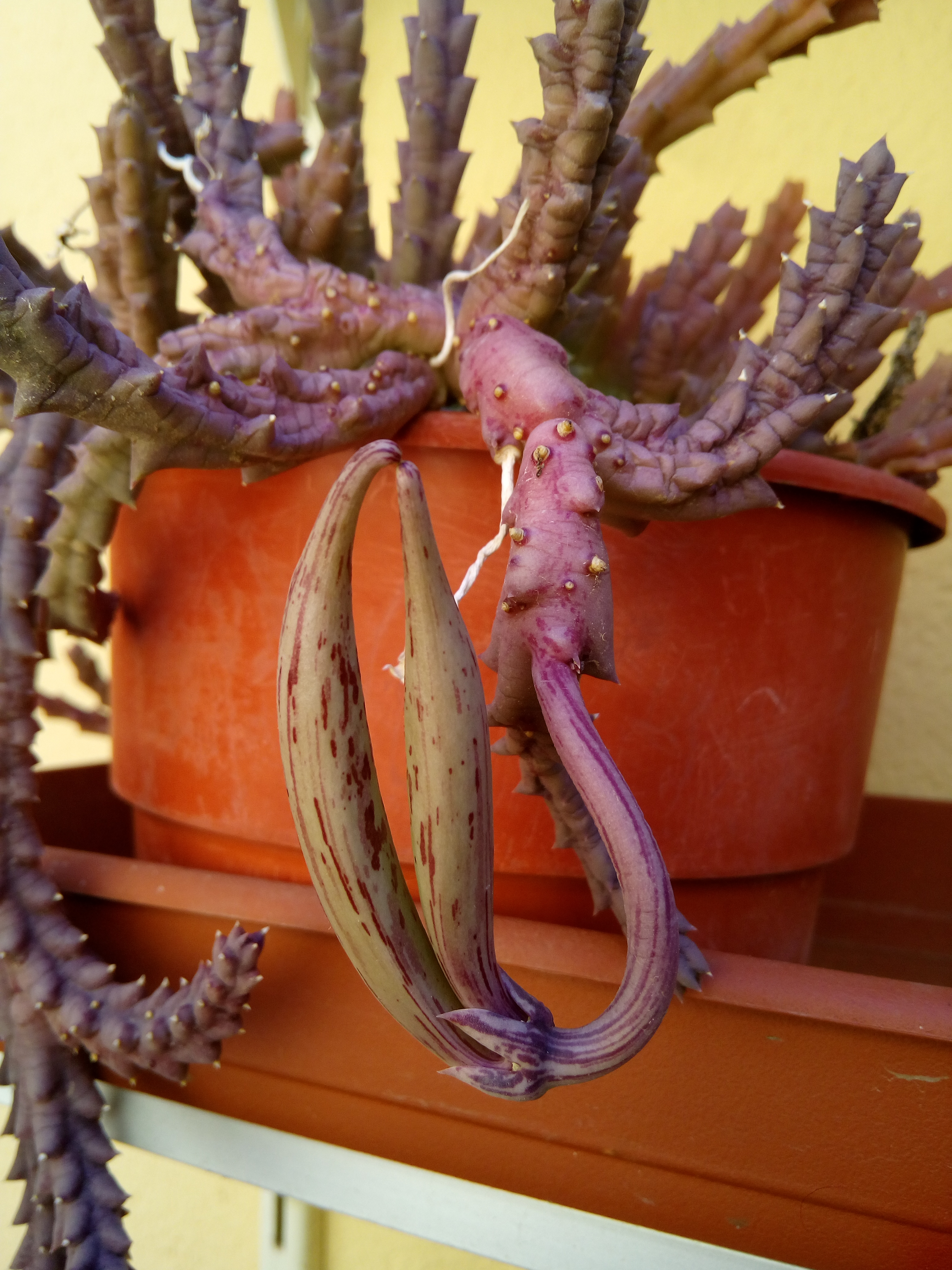
Fruit

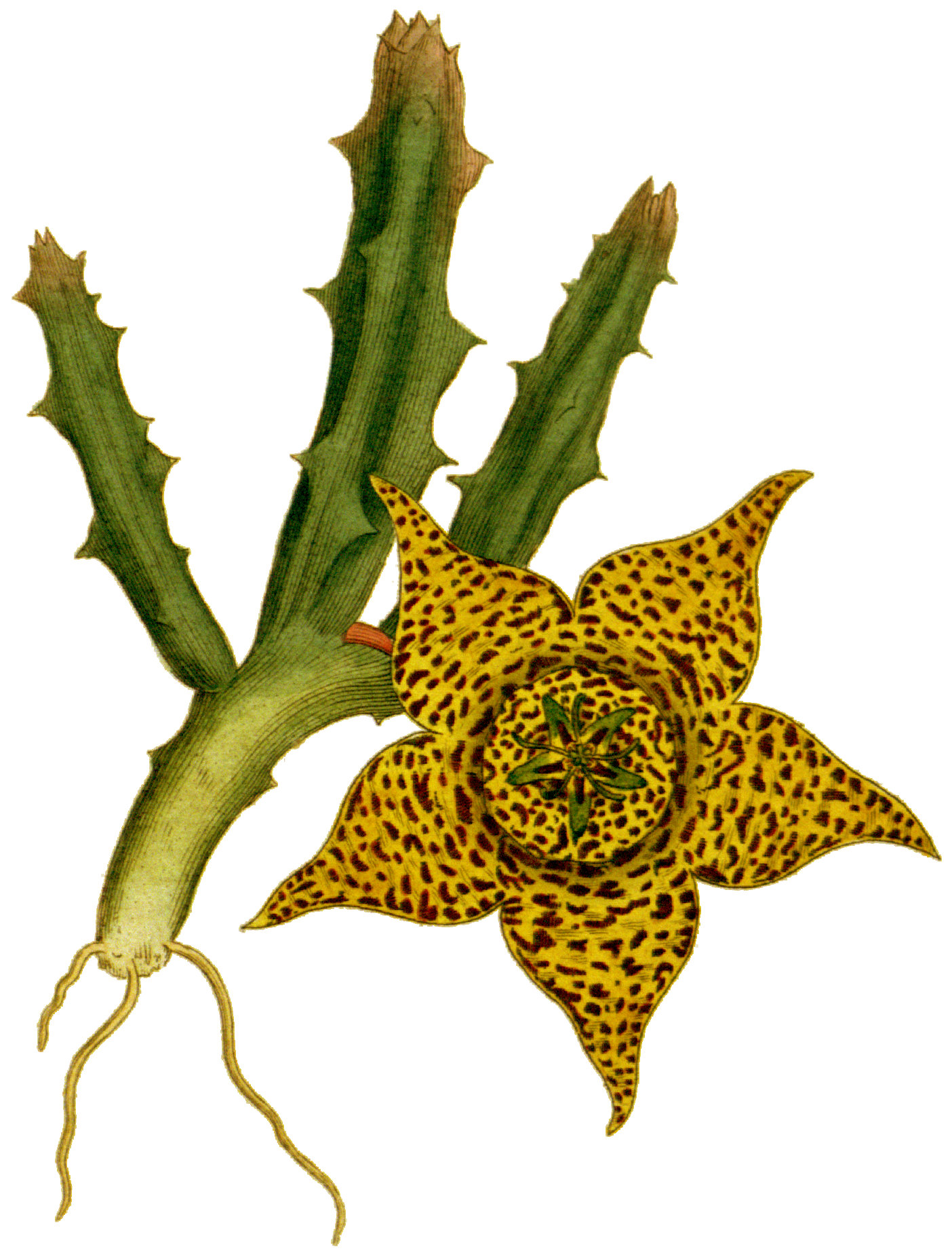
Botanical illustration

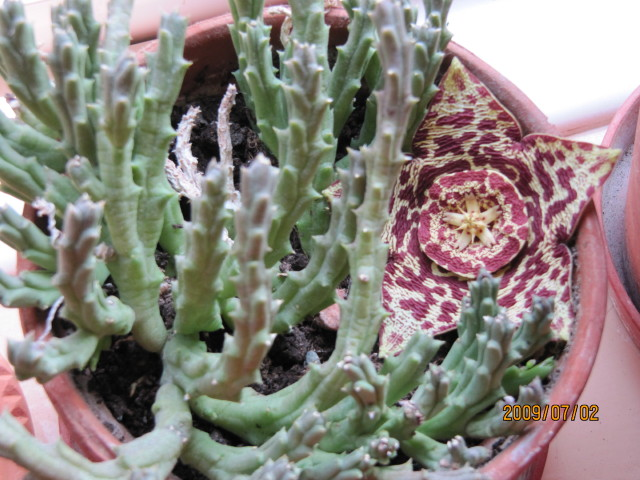
Opening flower

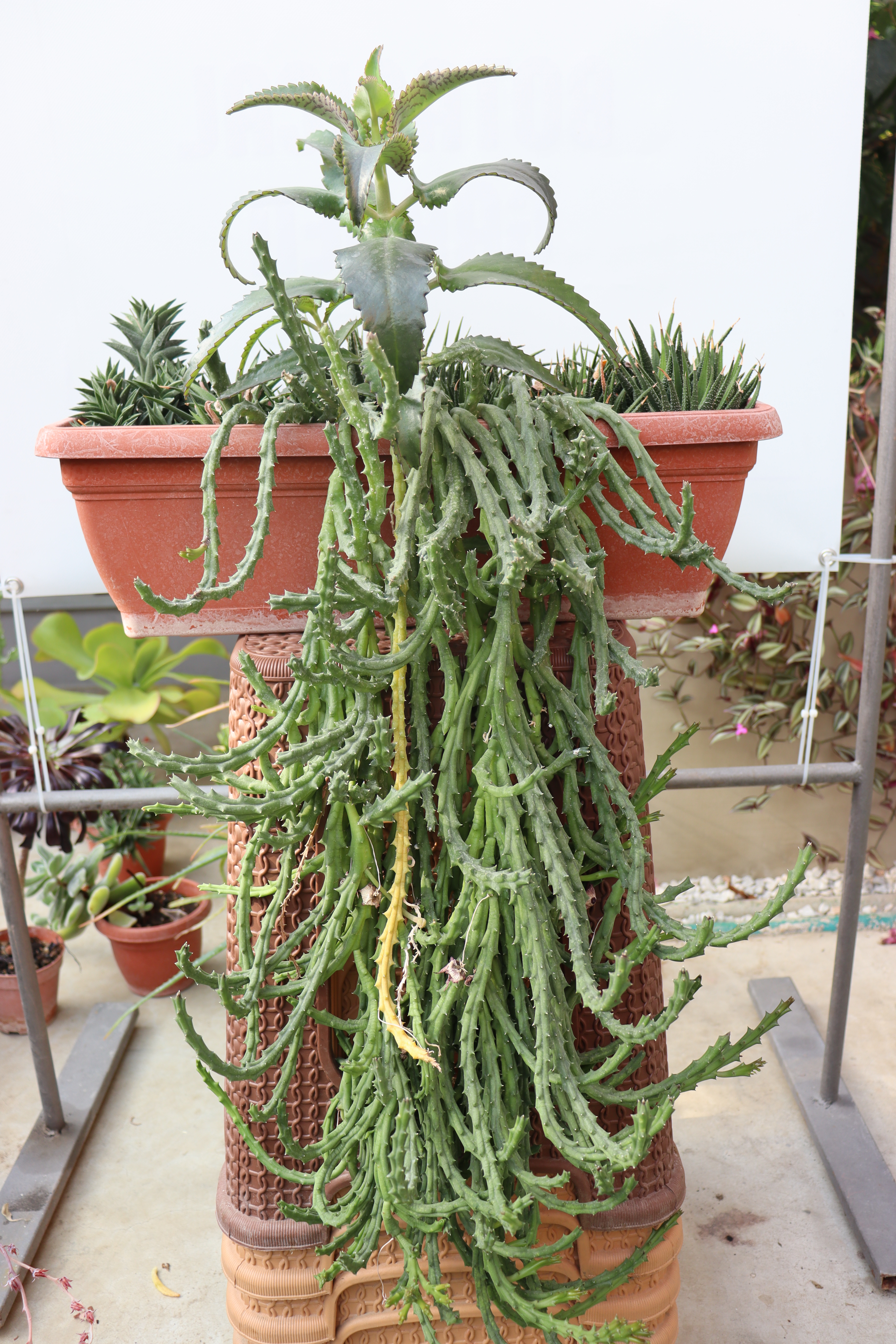
Long trailing stems
