= List of Gentianales of South Africa =

Flowering plants in the order Gentianales recorded from South Africa

The Gentianales are an order of flowering plants, included within the asterid clade of eudicots. It comprises more than 16,000 species in about 1,138 genera in 5 families. More than 80% of the species in this order belong to the family Rubiaceae.

The anthophytes are a grouping of plant taxa bearing flower-like reproductive structures. They were formerly thought to be a clade comprising plants bearing flower-like structures. The group contained the angiosperms - the extant flowering plants, such as roses and grasses - as well as the Gnetales and the extinct Bennettitales.

23,420 species of vascular plant have been recorded in South Africa, making it the sixth most species-rich country in the world and the most species-rich country on the African continent. Of these, 153 species are considered to be threatened. Nine biomes have been described in South Africa: Fynbos, Succulent Karoo, desert, Nama Karoo, grassland, savanna, Albany thickets, the Indian Ocean coastal belt, and forests.

The 2018 South African National Biodiversity Institute's National Biodiversity Assessment plant checklist lists 35,130 taxa in the phyla Anthocerotophyta (hornworts (6)), Anthophyta (flowering plants (33534)), Bryophyta (mosses (685)), Cycadophyta (cycads (42)), Lycopodiophyta (Lycophytes(45)), Marchantiophyta (liverworts (376)), Pinophyta (conifers (33)), and Pteridophyta (cryptogams (408)).

Five families are represented in the literature. Listed taxa include species, subspecies, varieties, and forms as recorded, some of which have subsequently been allocated to other taxa as synonyms, in which cases the accepted taxon is appended to the listing. Multiple entries under alternative names reflect taxonomic revision over time.

== Apocynaceae ==
Family: Apocynaceae, 112 genera have been recorded. Not all are necessarily currently accepted.

- Genus Acokanthera:
- Genus Adenium:
- Genus Ancylobothrys:
- Genus Anisotoma:
- Genus Araujia:
- Genus Arduina:
- Genus Asclepias:
- Genus Aspidoglossum:
- Genus Astephanus:
- Genus Australluma:
- Genus Brachystelma:
- Genus Callichilia:
- Genus Calotropis:
- Genus Caralluma:
- Genus Carandas:
- Genus Carissa:
- Genus Cascabela:
- Genus Catharanthus:
- Genus Ceropegia:
- Genus Chlorocyathus:
- Genus Cordylogyne:
- Genus Cryptolepis:
- Genus Cryptostegia:
- Genus Curroria:
- Genus Cynanchum:
- Genus Daemia:
- Genus Dichaelia:
- Genus Diplorhynchus:
- Genus Duvalia:
- Genus Echites:
- Genus Ectadiopsis:
- Genus Ectadium:
- Genus Emplectanthus:
- Genus Ephippiocarpa:
- Genus Eustegia:
- Genus Fanninia:
- Genus Fockea:
- Genus Funastrum: (syn. Sarcostemma)
- Genus Gomphocarpus:
- Genus Gonioma:
- Genus Gymnema:
- Genus Holarrhena:
- Genus Hoodia:
- Genus Huernia:
- Genus Huerniopsis:
- Genus Ischnolepis:
- Genus Jasminonerium:
- Genus Kanahia:
- Genus Lagarinthus:
- Genus Landolphia:
- Genus Larryleachia:
- Genus Lavrania:
- Genus Luckhoffia:
- Genus Macropetalum:
- Genus Marsdenia:
- Genus Microloma:
- Genus Miraglossum:
- Genus Mondia:
- Genus Nerium:
- Genus Notechidnopsis:
- Genus Oncinema:
- Genus Oncinotis:
- Genus Ophionella:
- Genus Orbea:
- Genus Orbeanthus:
- Genus Orbeopsis:
- Genus Orthanthera:
- Genus Pachycarpus:
- Genus Pachycymbium:
- Genus Pachypodium:
- Genus Parapodium:
- Genus Pectinaria:
- Genus Pentarrhinum:
- Genus Pentopetia:
- Genus Pergularia:
- Genus Periglossum:
- Genus Petopentia:
- Genus Piaranthus:
- Genus Quaqua:
- Genus Raphionacme:
- Genus Rauvolfia:
- Genus Rhyssolobium:
- Genus Richtersveldia:
- Genus Riocreuxia:
- Genus Schizoglossum:
- Genus Schizostephanus:
- Genus Secamone:
- Genus Sisyranthus:
- Genus Sphaerocodon:
- Genus Stapelia:
- Genus Stapeliopsis:
- Genus Stenostelma:
- Genus Stomatostemma:
- Genus Strophanthus:
- Genus Tabernaemontana:
- Genus Tacazzea:
- Genus Tavaresia:
- Genus Telosma:
- Genus Tenaris:
- Genus Thevetia:
- Genus Trachycalymma:
- Genus Trichocaulon:
- Genus Tridentea:
- Genus Tromotriche:
- Genus Vinca:
- Genus Vincetoxicum (syn. Tylophora)
- Genus Voacanga:
- Genus Woodia:
- Genus Wrightia:
- Genus Xysmalobium:

== Asclepiadaceae ==
- Family: Asclepiadaceae,

=== Belonites ===
Genus Belonites:

- Belonites succulentus (L.f.) E.Mey. accepted as Pachypodium succulentum (L.f.) Sweet, indigenous

=== Neopectinaria ===
Genus Neopectinaria:

- Neopectinaria saxatilis (N.E.Br.) Plowes, accepted as Stapeliopsis saxatilis (N.E.Br.) Bruyns, indigenous
  - Neopectinaria saxatilis (N.E.Br.) Plowes var. tulipiflora (C.A.Luckh.) Plowes, accepted as Stapeliopsis saxatilis (N.E.Br.) Bruyns, indigenous
- Neopectinaria stayneri (M.B.Bayer) Plowes, accepted as Stapeliopsis stayneri (M.B.Bayer) Bruyns, indigenous

== Gentianaceae ==
- Family: Gentianaceae,

=== Anthocleista ===
Genus Anthocleista:

- Anthocleista grandiflora Gilg, indigenous

=== Chironia ===
Genus Chironia:

- Chironia albiflora Hilliard, endemic
- Chironia arenaria E.Mey. endemic
- Chironia baccifera L. endemic
- Chironia decumbens Levyns, endemic
- Chironia jasminoides L. endemic
- Chironia krebsii Griseb. indigenous
- Chironia laxa Gilg, endemic
- Chironia linoides L. indigenous
  - Chironia linoides L. subsp. emarginata (Jaroscz) I.Verd. endemic
  - Chironia linoides L. subsp. linoides, endemic
  - Chironia linoides L. subsp. macrocalyx (Prain) I.Verd. endemic
  - Chironia linoides L. subsp. nana I.Verd. endemic
- Chironia melampyrifolia Lam. endemic
- Chironia palustris Burch. indigenous
  - Chironia palustris Burch. subsp. palustris, indigenous
  - Chironia palustris Burch. subsp. rosacea (Gilg) I.Verd. indigenous
  - Chironia palustris Burch. subsp. transvaalensis (Gilg) I.Verd. indigenous
  - Chironia peduncularis Lindl. endemic
- Chironia peglerae Prain, endemic
- Chironia purpurascens (E.Mey.) Benth. & Hook.f. indigenous
  - Chironia purpurascens (E.Mey.) Benth. & Hook.f. subsp. humilis (Gilg) I.Verd. indigenous
  - Chironia purpurascens (E.Mey.) Benth. & Hook.f. subsp. purpurascens, indigenous
- Chironia serpyllifolia Lehm. endemic
- Chironia stokoei I.Verd. endemic
- Chironia tetragona L.f. endemic

=== Enicostema ===
Genus Enicostema:

- Enicostema axillare (Lam.) A.Raynal, indigenous
  - Enicostema axillare (Lam.) A.Raynal subsp. axillare, indigenous
- Enicostema hyssopifolium (Willd.) I.Verd. accepted as Enicostema axillare (Lam.) A.Raynal subsp. axillare, present

=== Exacum ===
Genus Exacum:

- Exacum oldenlandioides (S.Moore) Klack. indigenous

=== Lagenias ===
Genus Lagenias:

- Lagenias pusillus (Eckl. ex Cham.) E.Mey. endemic

=== Neurotheca ===
Genus Neurotheca:

- Neurotheca congolana De Wild. & T.Durand, indigenous
- Neurotheca schlechteri Gilg ex Baker, accepted as Neurotheca congolana De Wild. & T.Durand, present

=== Orphium ===
Genus Orphium:

- Orphium frutescens (L.) E.Mey. endemic

=== Sebaea ===
Genus Sebaea:

- Sebaea albens (L.f.) Roem. & Schult. endemic
- Sebaea ambigua Cham. endemic
- Sebaea amicorum I.M.Oliv. & Beyers, endemic
- Sebaea aurea (L.f.) Roem. & Schult. endemic
- Sebaea bojeri Griseb. indigenous
- Sebaea capitata Cham. & Schltdl. indigenous
  - Sebaea capitata Cham. & Schltdl. var. capitata, endemic
  - Sebaea capitata Cham. & Schltdl. var. sclerosepala (Schinz) Marais, endemic
- Sebaea compacta A.W.Hill, endemic
- Sebaea debilis (Welw.) Schinz, accepted as Exochaenium debile Welw.
- Sebaea elongata E.Mey. endemic
- Sebaea erosa Schinz, indigenous
- Sebaea exacoides (L.) Schinz, endemic
- Sebaea exigua (Oliv.) Schinz, indigenous
- Sebaea filiformis Schinz, indigenous
- Sebaea fourcadei Marais, endemic
- Sebaea grandis (E.Mey.) Steud. accepted as Exochaenium grande (E.Mey.) Griseb. indigenous
- Sebaea grisebachiana Schinz, endemic
- Sebaea hymenosepala Gilg, endemic
- Sebaea junodii Schinz, indigenous
- Sebaea laxa N.E.Br. endemic
- Sebaea leiostyla Gilg, indigenous
- Sebaea longicaulis Schinz, indigenous
- Sebaea macrophylla Gilg, indigenous
- Sebaea marlothii Gilg, indigenous
- Sebaea membranacea A.W.Hill, endemic
- Sebaea micrantha (Cham. & Schltdl.) Schinz, indigenous
  - Sebaea micrantha (Cham. & Schltdl.) Schinz var. intermedia (Cham. & Schltdl.) Marais, endemic
  - Sebaea micrantha (Cham. & Schltdl.) Schinz var. micrantha, endemic
- Sebaea minutiflora Schinz, endemic
- Sebaea minutissima Hilliard & B.L.Burtt, indigenous
- Sebaea natalensis Schinz, indigenous
- Sebaea pentandra E.Mey. indigenous
  - Sebaea pentandra E.Mey. var. burchellii (Gilg) Marais, indigenous
  - Sebaea pentandra E.Mey. var. pentandra, indigenous
- Sebaea pleurostigmatosa Hilliard & B.L.Burtt, endemic
- Sebaea procumbens A.W.Hill, indigenous
- Sebaea pusilla Eckl. ex Cham. accepted as Lagenias pusillus (Eckl. ex Cham.) E.Mey. endemic
- Sebaea radiata Hilliard & B.L.Burtt, endemic
- Sebaea ramosissima Gilg, endemic
- Sebaea rara Wolley-Dod, endemic
- Sebaea rehmannii Schinz, indigenous
- Sebaea repens Schinz, indigenous
- Sebaea scabra Schinz, endemic
- Sebaea schlechteri Schinz, endemic
- Sebaea sedoides Gilg, indigenous
  - Sebaea sedoides Gilg var. confertiflora (Schinz) Marais, indigenous
  - Sebaea sedoides Gilg var. schoenlandii (Schinz) Marais, indigenous
  - Sebaea sedoides Gilg var. sedoides, indigenous
- Sebaea spathulata (E.Mey.) Steud. indigenous
- Sebaea stricta (E.Mey.) Gilg, endemic
- Sebaea sulphurea Cham. & Schltdl. endemic
- Sebaea thodeana Gilg, indigenous
- Sebaea thomasii (S.Moore) Schinz, indigenous
- Sebaea zeyheri Schinz, indigenous
  - Sebaea zeyheri Schinz subsp. acutiloba (Schinz) Marais, endemic
  - Sebaea zeyheri Schinz subsp. cleistantha (R.A.Dyer) Marais, endemic
  - Sebaea zeyheri Schinz subsp. zeyheri, endemic

=== Swertia ===
Genus Swertia:

- Swertia welwitschii Engl. indigenous

== Loganiaceae ==
Family: Loganiaceae,

=== Strychnos ===
Genus Strychnos:

- Strychnos cocculoides Baker, indigenous
- Strychnos decussata (Pappe) Gilg, indigenous
- Strychnos gerrardii N.E.Br. indigenous
- Strychnos henningsii Gilg, indigenous
- Strychnos madagascariensis Poir. indigenous
- Strychnos mitis S.Moore, indigenous
- Strychnos potatorum L.f. indigenous
- Strychnos pungens Soler. indigenous
- Strychnos spinosa Lam. indigenous
- Strychnos spinosa Lam. subsp. spinosa, indigenous
- Strychnos usambarensis Gilg, indigenous

== Rubiaceae ==
- Family: Rubiaceae, 75 genera have been recorded. Not all are necessarily currently accepted.
- Genus Afrocanthium:
- Genus Agathisanthemum:
- Genus Alberta:
- Genus Ancylanthos:
- Genus Anthospermum:
- Genus Breonadia:
- Genus Burchellia:
- Genus Canthium:
- Genus Carpacoce:
- Genus Catunaregam:
- Genus Cephalanthus:
- Genus Coddia:
- Genus Coffea:
- Genus Conostomium:
- Genus Coprosma:
- Genus Coptosperma:
- Genus Cordylostigma:
- Genus Crocyllis:
- Genus Crossopteryx:
- Genus Diodia:
- Genus Diplospora:
- Genus Empogona:
- Genus Eriosemopsis:
- Genus Fadogia:
- Genus Gaillonia:
- Genus Galium:
- Genus Galopina:
- Genus Gardenia:
- Genus Geophila:
- Genus Guettarda:
- Genus Hedyotis:
- Genus Heinsia:
- Genus Hymenodictyon:
- Genus Hyperacanthus:
- Genus Hypobathrum:
- Genus Ixora:
- Genus Keetia:
- Genus Kohautia:
- Genus Kraussia:
- Genus Lagynias:
- Genus Leptactina:
- Genus Mitriostigma:
- Genus Nenax:
- Genus Oldenlandia:
- Genus Otiophora:
- Genus Oxyanthus:
- Genus Pachystigma:
- Genus Pavetta:
- Genus Pentanisia:
- Genus Pentas:
- Genus Pentodon:
- Genus Phylohydrax:
- Genus Plectronia:
- Genus Plectroniella:
- Genus Plocama:
- Genus Psychotria:
- Genus Psydrax:
- Genus Pygmaeothamnus:
- Genus Pyrostria:
- Genus Randia:
- Genus Richardia:
- Genus Rothmannia:
- Genus Rubia:
- Genus Rytigynia:
- Genus Sericanthe:
- Genus Sherardia:
- Genus Spermacoce:
- Genus Stylocoryne:
- Genus Tapiphyllum:
- Genus Tarenna:
- Genus Tricalysia:
- Genus Trichostachys:
- Genus Vangueria:
