= Pectinaria =

Pectinaria may refer to:

- Pectinaria (plant), a genus of asclepiads (Apocynaceae)
- Pectinaria (annelid), a genus of fanworms
- Pectinaria Cordem., a synonym for the orchid genus Angraecum
