= Chironia laxiflora =

Scientific classification
- Kingdom: Plantae
- Clade: Tracheophytes
- Clade: Angiosperms
- Clade: Eudicots
- Clade: Asterids
- Order: Gentianales
- Family: Gentianaceae
- Genus: Chironia
- Species: C. laxiflora

Binomial name
- Chironia laxiflora Baker, (1894)

Synonyms
- Chironia rubrocoerulea Gilg

Species of plant

Chironia laxiflora is a plant that is part of the genus Chironia. The species is native to Malawi, Mozambique, Tanzania and Zambia.
