= Chironia katangensis =

Scientific classification
- Kingdom: Plantae
- Clade: Tracheophytes
- Clade: Angiosperms
- Clade: Eudicots
- Clade: Asterids
- Order: Gentianales
- Family: Gentianaceae
- Genus: Chironia
- Species: C. katangensis

Binomial name
- Chironia katangensis De Wild., (1913)

Species of plant

Chironia katangensis is a plant belonging to the genus Chironia. The species is endemic to the Democratic Republic of the Congo.
