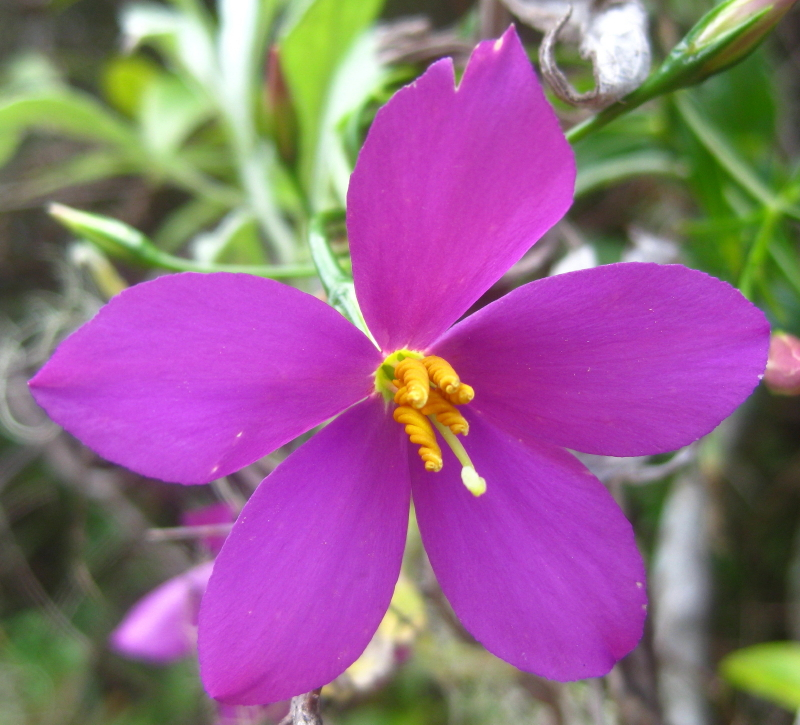

Scientific classification
- Kingdom: Plantae
- Clade: Tracheophytes
- Clade: Angiosperms
- Clade: Eudicots
- Clade: Asterids
- Order: Gentianales
- Family: Gentianaceae
- Genus: Chironia
- Species: C. gratissima

Binomial name
- Chironia gratissima S.Moore, (1911)

= Chironia gratissima =

Species of plant

Chironia gratissima is a plant that is part of the genus Chironia. The species is native to the Democratic Republic of the Congo, Mozambique, and Zimbabwe.
