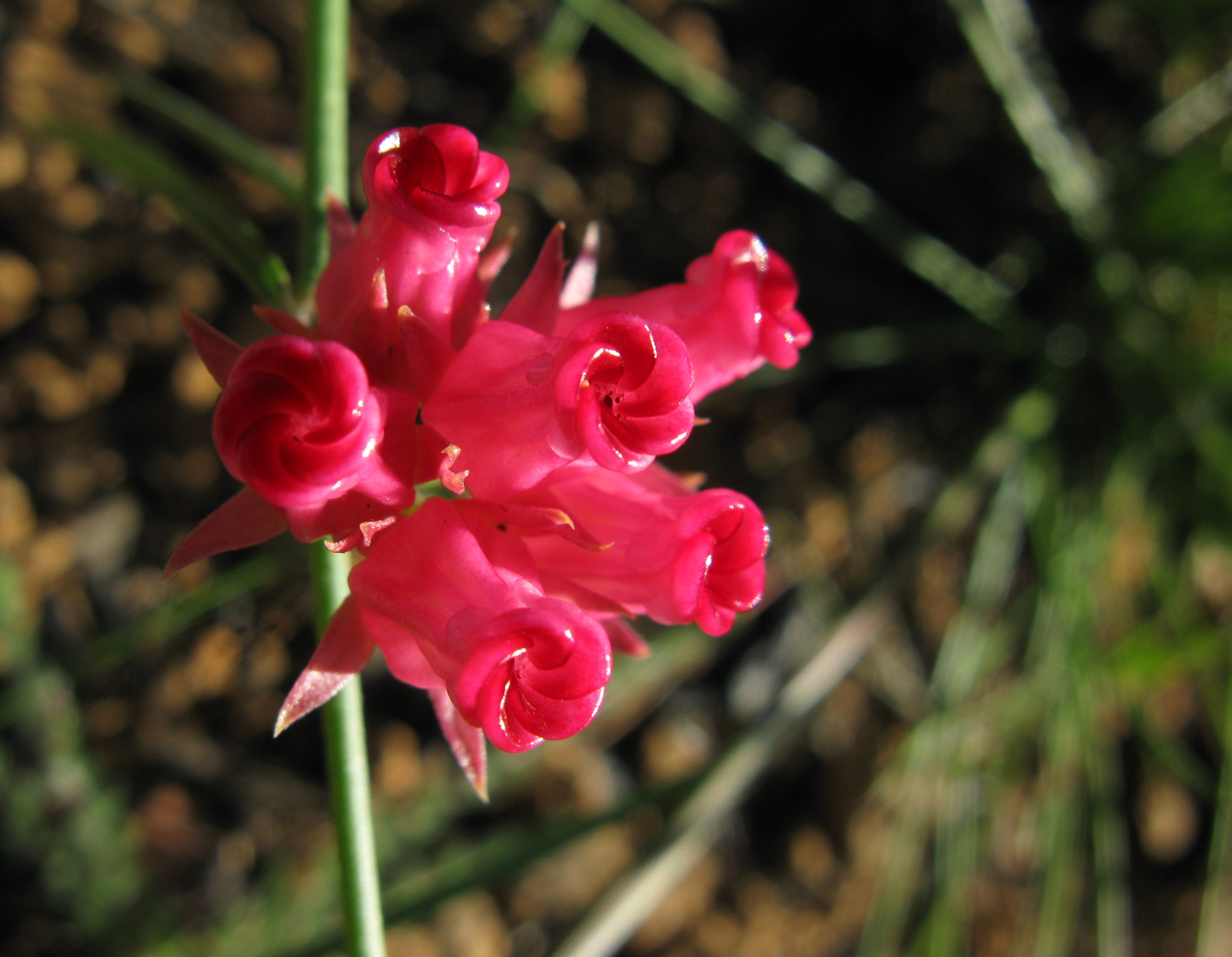
- The glossy, urn-shaped flowers of Microloma tenuifolium

Scientific classification
- Kingdom: Plantae
- Clade: Tracheophytes
- Clade: Angiosperms
- Clade: Eudicots
- Clade: Asterids
- Order: Gentianales
- Family: Apocynaceae
- Genus: Microloma
- Species: M. tenuifolium

Binomial name
- Microloma tenuifolium (L.) K.Schum.

= Microloma tenuifolium =

Species of plant

Microloma tenuifolium, or kannetjies, is a species of plant in the family Apocynaceae that is native to the south-western Cape, South Africa.

== Description ==
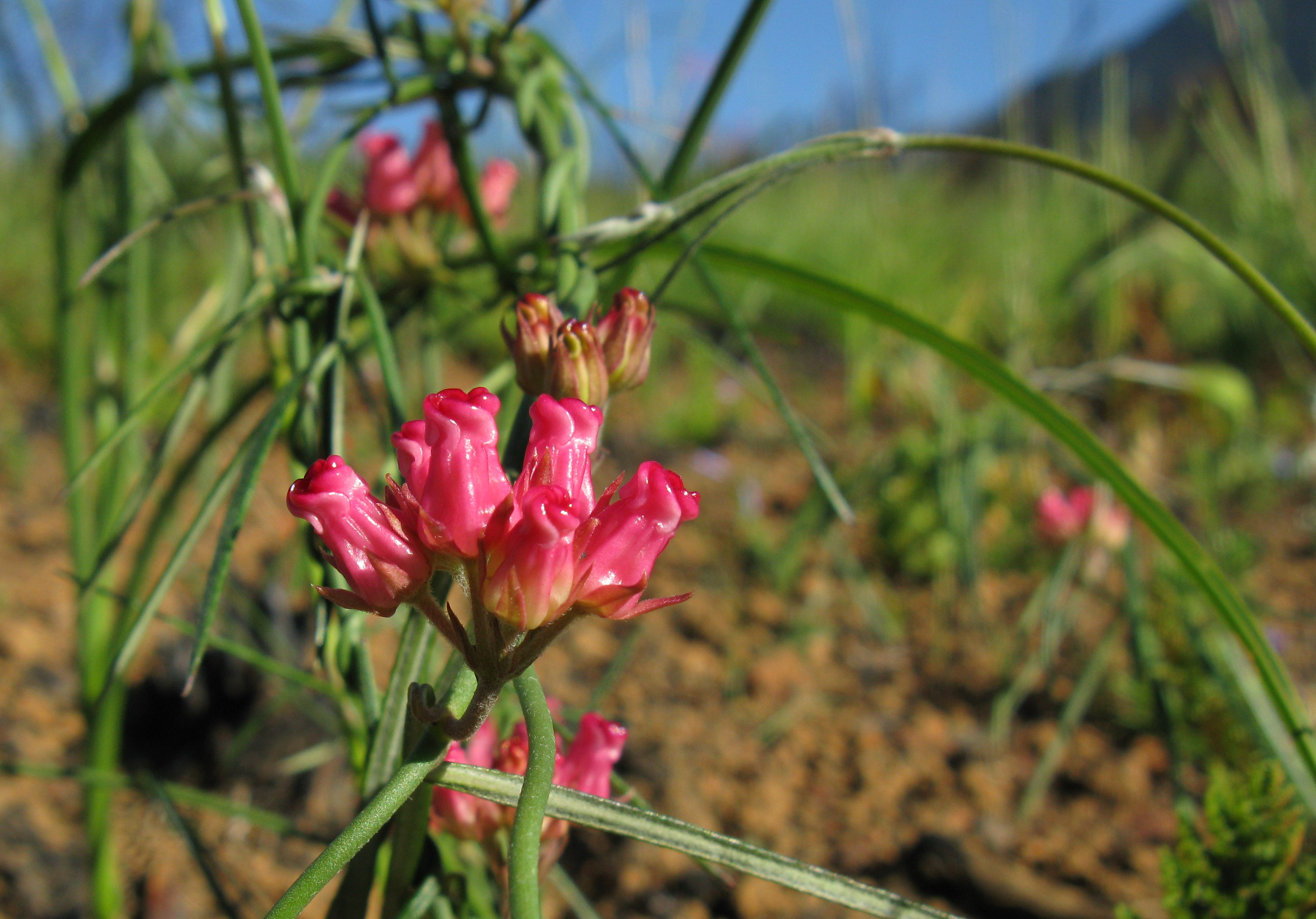
Microloma tenuifolium stems and flowers

Like other Microloma species, this is a thin climbing plant. However this species has long, slender leaves ("tenuifolium" means "slender leaves") and a swollen rootstock.

It also has distinctively shaped, waxy, brightly coloured flowers. The flower sepals are held close to the main flower's column, which is twisted. The flowers appear mostly in winter and spring.

== Distribution ==
This species usually occurs in the southern and western coastal districts, in a predominantly winter-rainfall region, with its range mostly lying within the Western Cape Province. It also extends into the westernmost part of the Eastern Cape Province.
