= Chironia fernandesiana =

Scientific classification
- Kingdom: Plantae
- Clade: Tracheophytes
- Clade: Angiosperms
- Clade: Eudicots
- Clade: Asterids
- Order: Gentianales
- Family: Gentianaceae
- Genus: Chironia
- Species: C. fernandesiana

Binomial name
- Chironia fernandesiana Paiva & I.Nogueira, (1989 gepubl. 1990)

Species of plant

Chironia fernandesiana is a plant in the genus Chironia. The species is endemic to the Democratic Republic of the Congo.
