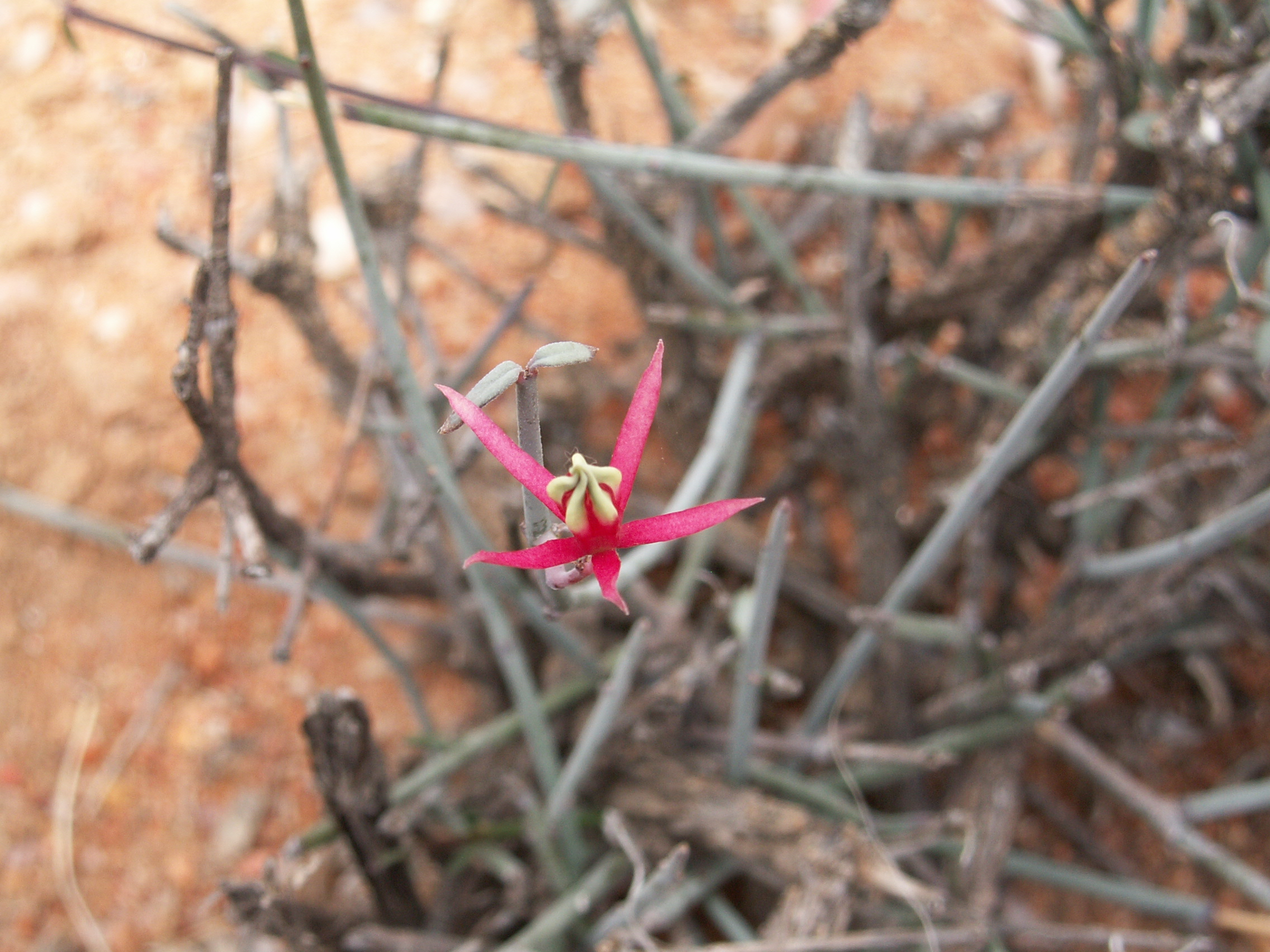

Scientific classification
- Kingdom: Plantae
- Clade: Embryophytes
- Clade: Tracheophytes
- Clade: Spermatophytes
- Clade: Angiosperms
- Clade: Eudicots
- Clade: Asterids
- Order: Gentianales
- Family: Apocynaceae
- Genus: Microloma
- Species: M. calycinum

Binomial name
- Microloma calycinum E.Mey.

Synonyms
- Homotypic Synonyms: Microloma calycinum var. purpurascens E.Mey.; Heterotypic Synonyms: Microloma calycinum var. flavescens E.Mey.; Microloma calycinum subsp. flavescens (E.Mey.) Wanntorp

= Microloma calycinum =

Species of plant

Microloma calycinum is a species of flowering plant in the family Apocynaceae. It is native to the Namaqualand region, in the far north-west of South Africa, as well as southern Namibia.
