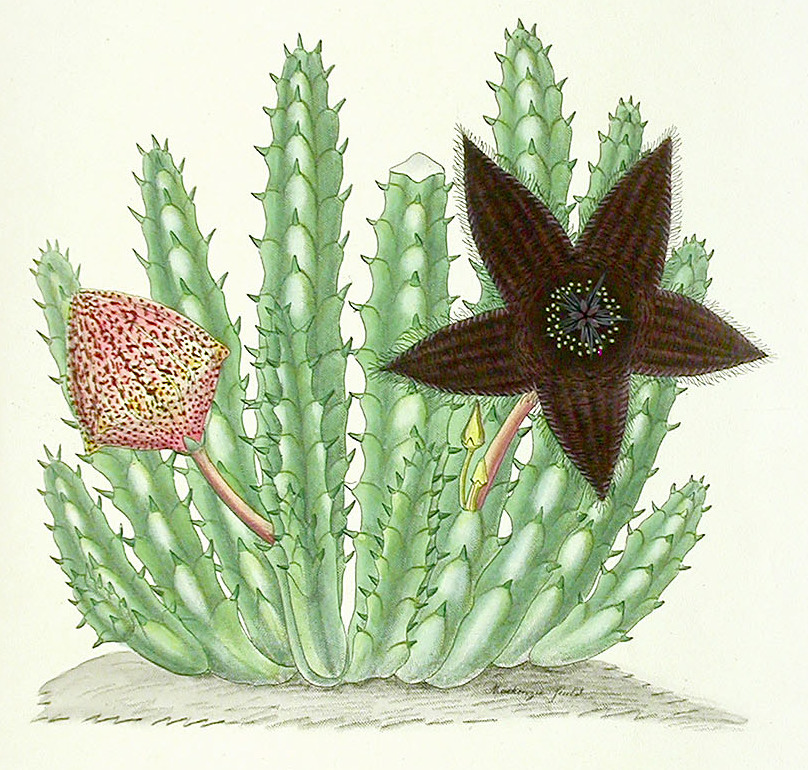
- Botanical illustration of Tridentea gemmiflora

Conservation status
- Least Concern (IUCN 3.1)

Scientific classification
- Kingdom: Plantae
- Clade: Tracheophytes
- Clade: Angiosperms
- Clade: Eudicots
- Clade: Asterids
- Order: Gentianales
- Family: Apocynaceae
- Genus: Tridentea
- Species: T. gemmiflora

Binomial name
- Tridentea gemmiflora (Masson) Haw.

= Tridentea gemmiflora =

Species of plant

Tridentea gemmiflora ("twin-flowered tridentea") is a species of plant in the family Apocynaceae. It is endemic to South Africa and is common in the Little Karoo and Western Cape Province. Its natural habitats are rocky areas.

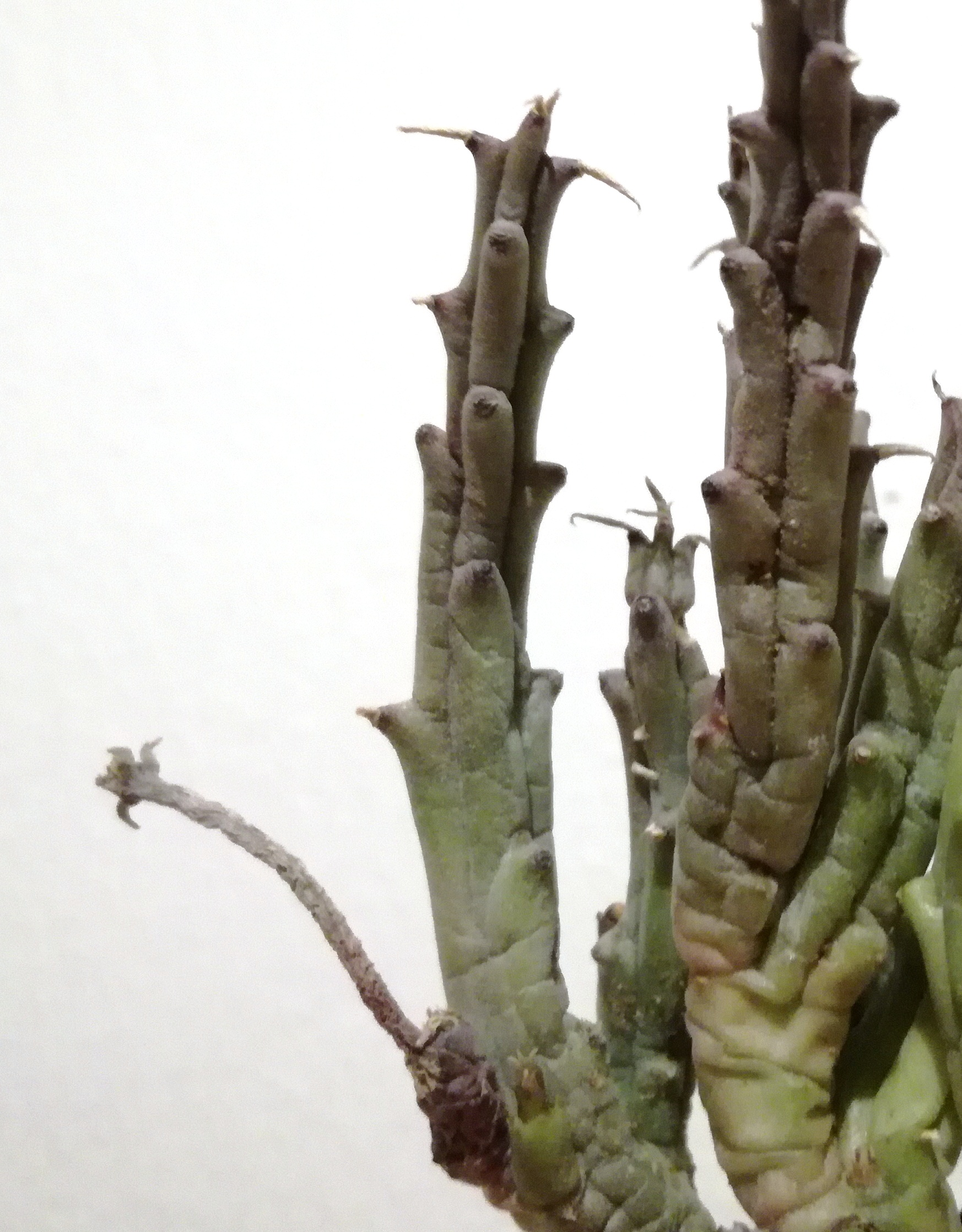
Stem specimen showing leaf remnants and flower stem
