= Chironia elgonensis =

Scientific classification
- Kingdom: Plantae
- Clade: Tracheophytes
- Clade: Angiosperms
- Clade: Eudicots
- Clade: Asterids
- Order: Gentianales
- Family: Gentianaceae
- Genus: Chironia
- Species: C. elgonensis

Binomial name
- Chironia elgonensis Bullock, (1932)

Species of plant

Chironia elgonensis is a plant that is part of the genus Chironia. The species is native to Burundi, Kenya, Tanzania and Zambia.
