= Chironia baumiana =

Scientific classification
- Kingdom: Plantae
- Clade: Tracheophytes
- Clade: Angiosperms
- Clade: Eudicots
- Clade: Asterids
- Order: Gentianales
- Family: Gentianaceae
- Genus: Chironia
- Species: C. baumiana

Binomial name
- Chironia baumiana Gilg, (1904)

Species of plant

Chironia baumiana is a plant that is part of the genus Chironia. The species is endemic to Angola.
