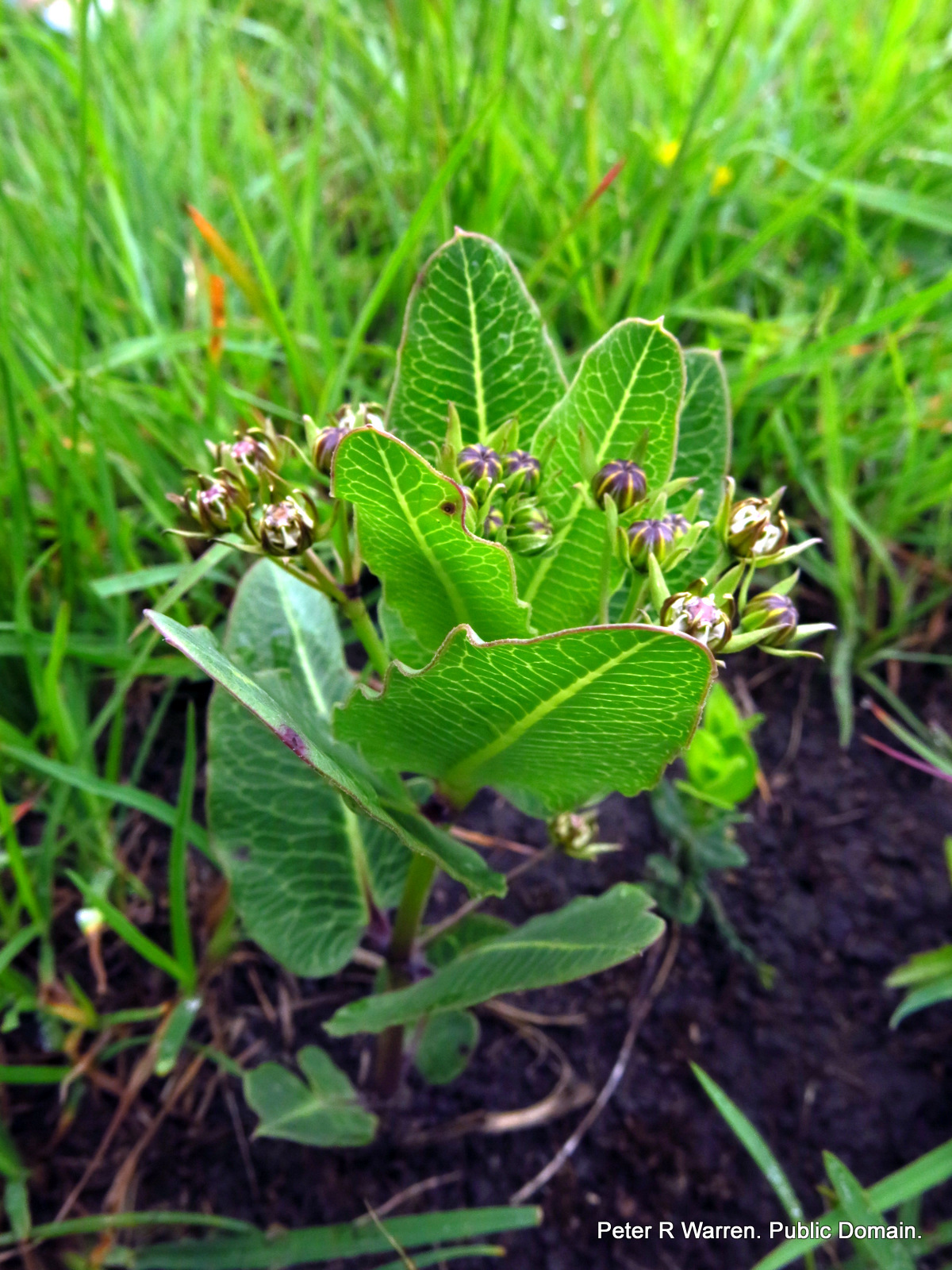

Conservation status
- Vulnerable (SANBI Red List)

Scientific classification
- Kingdom: Plantae
- Clade: Tracheophytes
- Clade: Angiosperms
- Clade: Eudicots
- Clade: Asterids
- Order: Gentianales
- Family: Apocynaceae
- Genus: Woodia
- Species: W. verruculosa

Binomial name
- Woodia verruculosa Schltr.

= Woodia verruculosa =

Species of plant

Woodia verruculosa is a species of plant endemic to the KwaZulu-Natal Midlands in South Africa. It is threatened with extinction.

== Range and habitat ==
Woodia verruculosa is found in the KwaZulu-Natal Midlands, from Howick to Ixopo. It is found in mistbelt forest and Ngongoni (Southern KwaZulu-Natal coastal belt grassland) habitat at an elevation of 800-1000m.

== Gallery ==
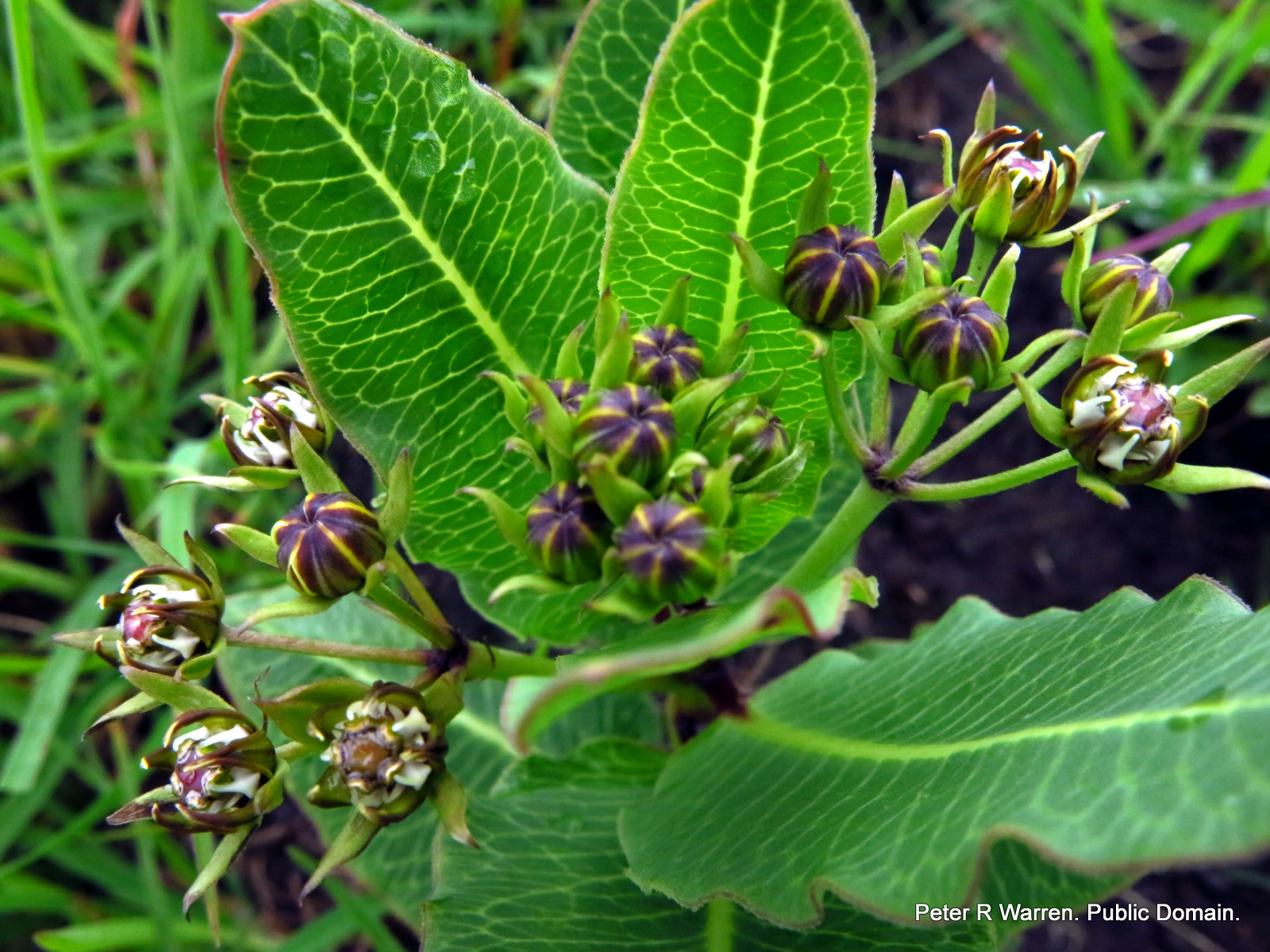
Flowers and leaves

== Conservation status ==
Woodia verruculosa is classified as vulnerable due to its restricted range, the small number of subpopulations (in 8 or 9 locations), competition from invasive alien plants, and the ongoing loss and degradation of grassland habitat as a consequence of agriculture encroachment and urban expansion.
