= Cordylogyne globosa =

Scientific classification
- Kingdom: Plantae
- Clade: Embryophytes
- Clade: Tracheophytes
- Clade: Spermatophytes
- Clade: Angiosperms
- Clade: Eudicots
- Clade: Asterids
- Order: Gentianales
- Family: Apocynaceae
- Tribe: Asclepiadeae
- Genus: Cordylogyne
- Species: C. globosa

Binomial name
- Cordylogyne globosa E.Mey.

Species of plant

Cordylogyne globosa is a species of flowering plant in the family Apocynaceae, native to southern Africa (the Cape Provinces, the Free State, KwaZulu-Natal, and the Northern Provinces in South Africa, and Lesotho). It was first described by Ernst Meyer in 1838.
