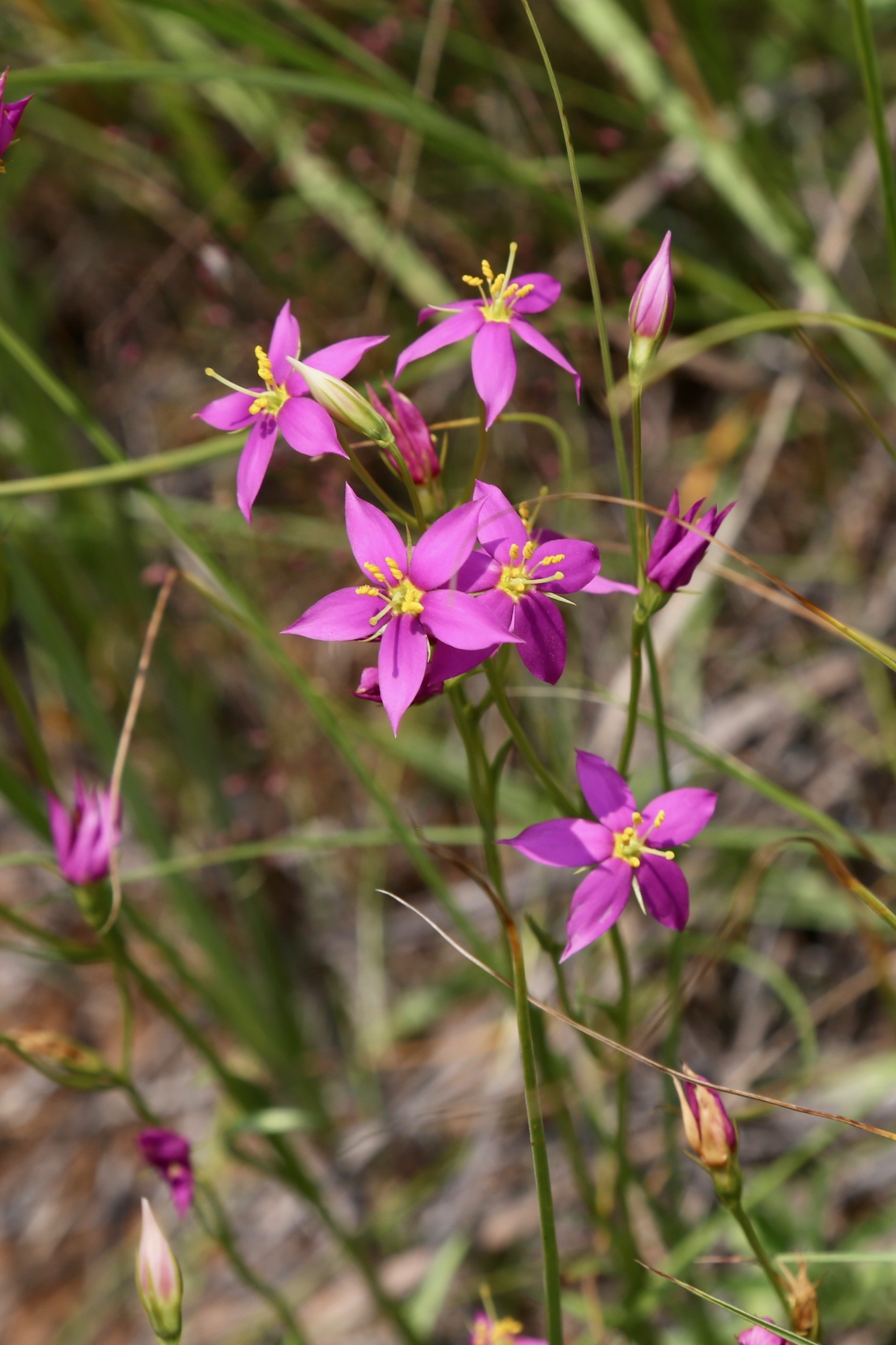

Scientific classification
- Kingdom: Plantae
- Clade: Embryophytes
- Clade: Tracheophytes
- Clade: Spermatophytes
- Clade: Angiosperms
- Clade: Eudicots
- Clade: Asterids
- Order: Gentianales
- Family: Gentianaceae
- Genus: Chironia
- Species: C. purpurascens

Binomial name
- Chironia purpurascens (E.Mey.) Benth. & Hook.f.

Synonyms
- Plocandra purpurascens E.Mey.

= Chironia purpurascens =

Species of plant

Chironia purpurascens is a species of flowering plant in the family Gentianaceae. It is sometimes referred to by the common names purple chironia or dwarf chironia. The species is native to Eswatini, Mozambique, South Africa and Zimbabwe. In South Africa, the plant is found in KwaZulu-Natal, the Eastern Cape and the Western Cape.
