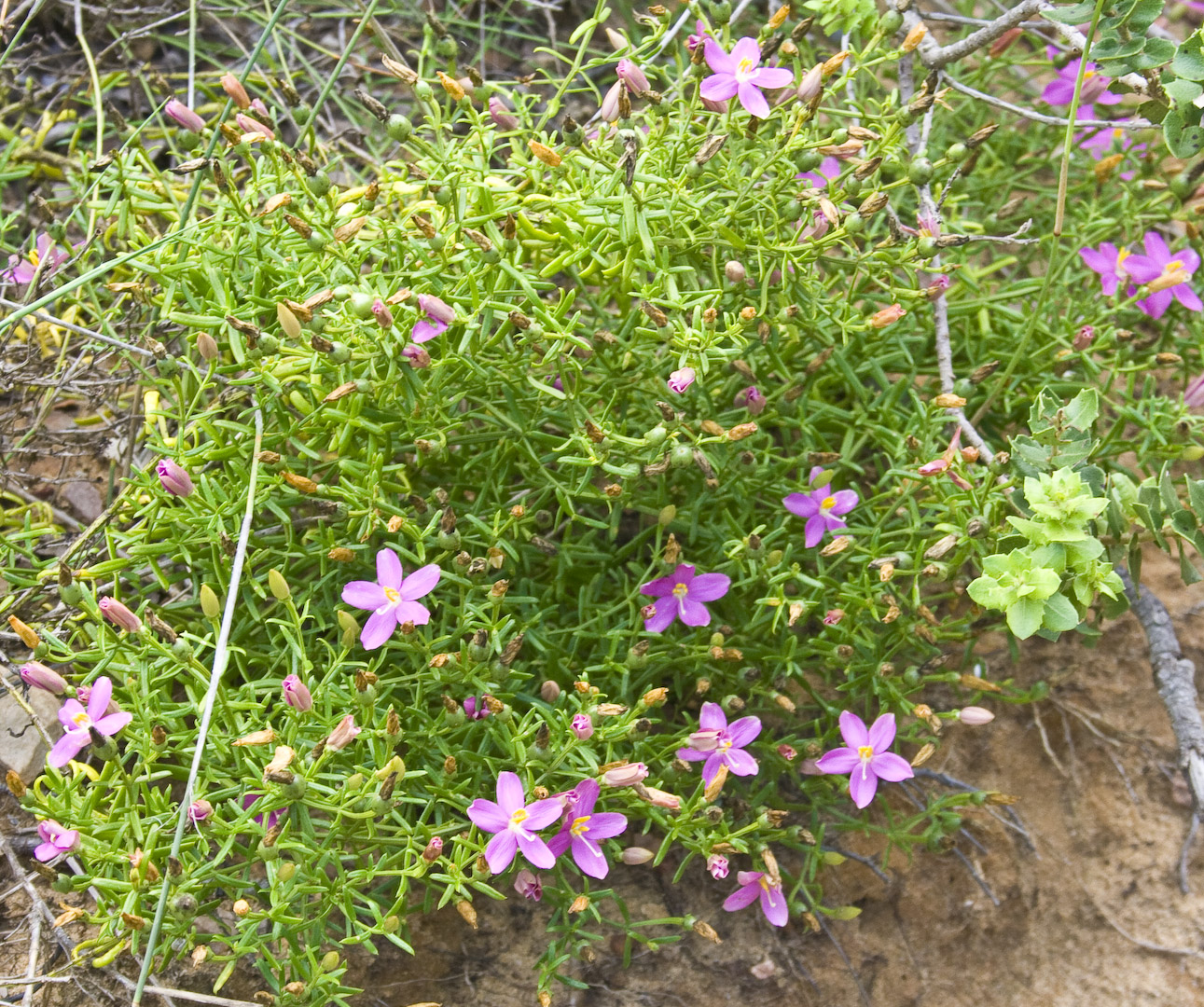
- In bloom
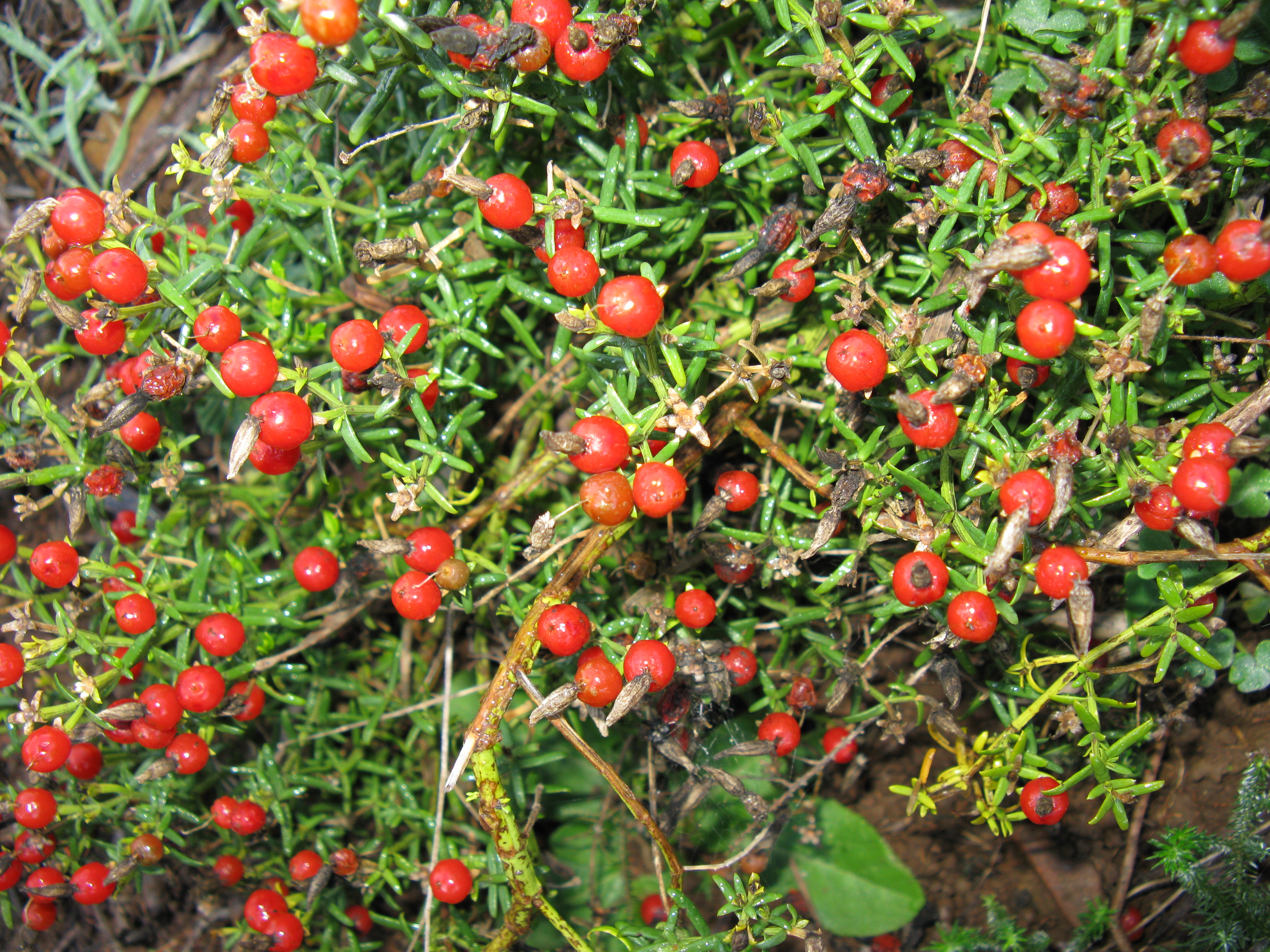
- In fruit

Scientific classification
- Kingdom: Plantae
- Clade: Tracheophytes
- Clade: Angiosperms
- Clade: Eudicots
- Clade: Asterids
- Order: Gentianales
- Family: Gentianaceae
- Genus: Chironia
- Species: C. baccifera

Binomial name
- Chironia baccifera L.

Synonyms
- List: Chironia baccata Hoffmanns.; Chironia parviflora Salisb.; Roeslinia baccifera G.Don; Roeslinia tetragona Moench

= Chironia baccifera =

Species of plant

Chironia baccifera, known as Christmas berry (a name it shares with Passerina ericoides), bitterbossie or aambeibessie, is species of Chironia native to southern South Africa. A bushy shrub, it can reach 1 m (3 ft 3 in), but is typically 0.5 m (1 ft 8 in) in width and height. Its Afrikaans name aambeibessie refers to its supposed medicinal use in treating haemorrhoids. It is used as an ornamental, preferring sandy soils. It is mildly toxic.
