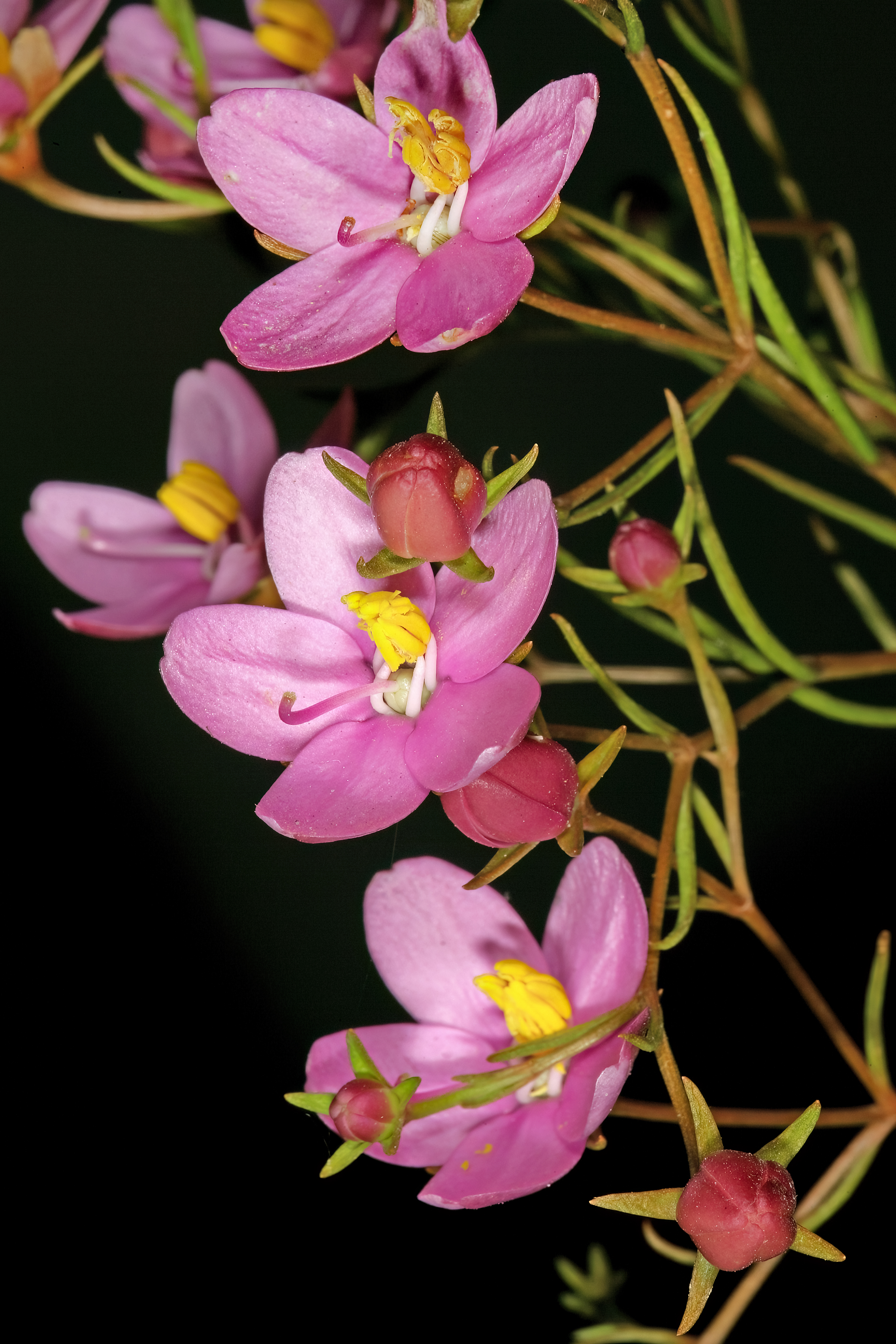

Scientific classification
- Kingdom: Plantae
- Clade: Tracheophytes
- Clade: Angiosperms
- Clade: Eudicots
- Clade: Asterids
- Order: Gentianales
- Family: Gentianaceae
- Genus: Chironia
- Species: C. linoides

Binomial name
- Chironia linoides L., (1753)

Synonyms
- Chironia vulgaris var. linoides (L.) Cham.

= Chironia linoides =

Species of plant

Chironia linoides, the Cape chiron, Cape centaury or Kaapse bitterwortel in Afrikaans, is a plant that is part of the genus Chironia. The species is endemic to South Africa and occurs in the Northern Cape and the Western Cape.
