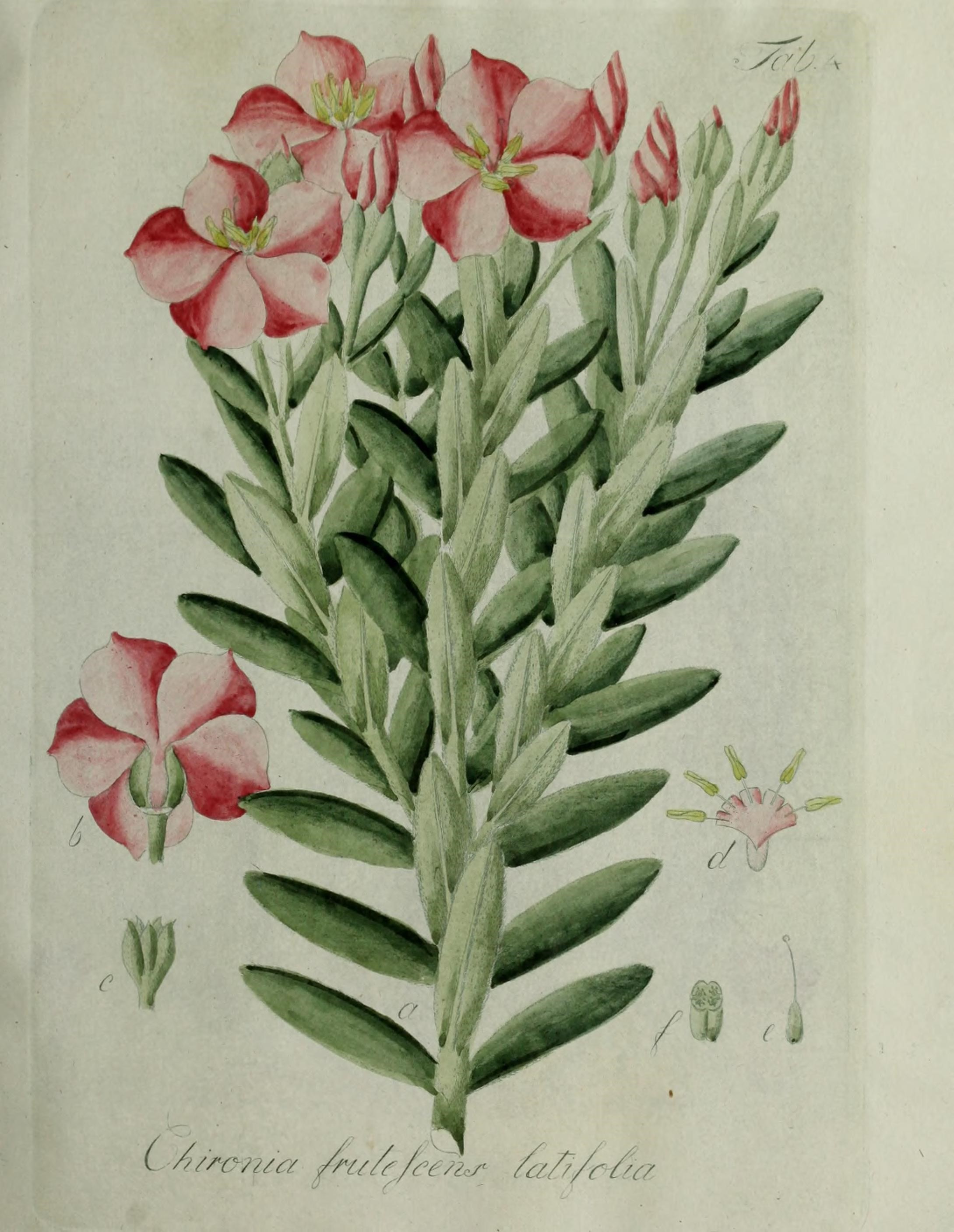

Scientific classification
- Kingdom: Plantae
- Clade: Tracheophytes
- Clade: Angiosperms
- Clade: Eudicots
- Clade: Asterids
- Order: Gentianales
- Family: Gentianaceae
- Genus: Chironia
- Species: C. peduncularis

Binomial name
- Chironia peduncularis Lindl., (1836)

Synonyms
- Chironia barclayana Griseb.; Chironia latifolia E.Mey.; Eupodia purpurea Raf.

= Chironia peduncularis =

Species of plant

Chironia peduncularis is a plant that is part of the genus Chironia. The species is endemic to South Africa and occurs in the Eastern Cape.
