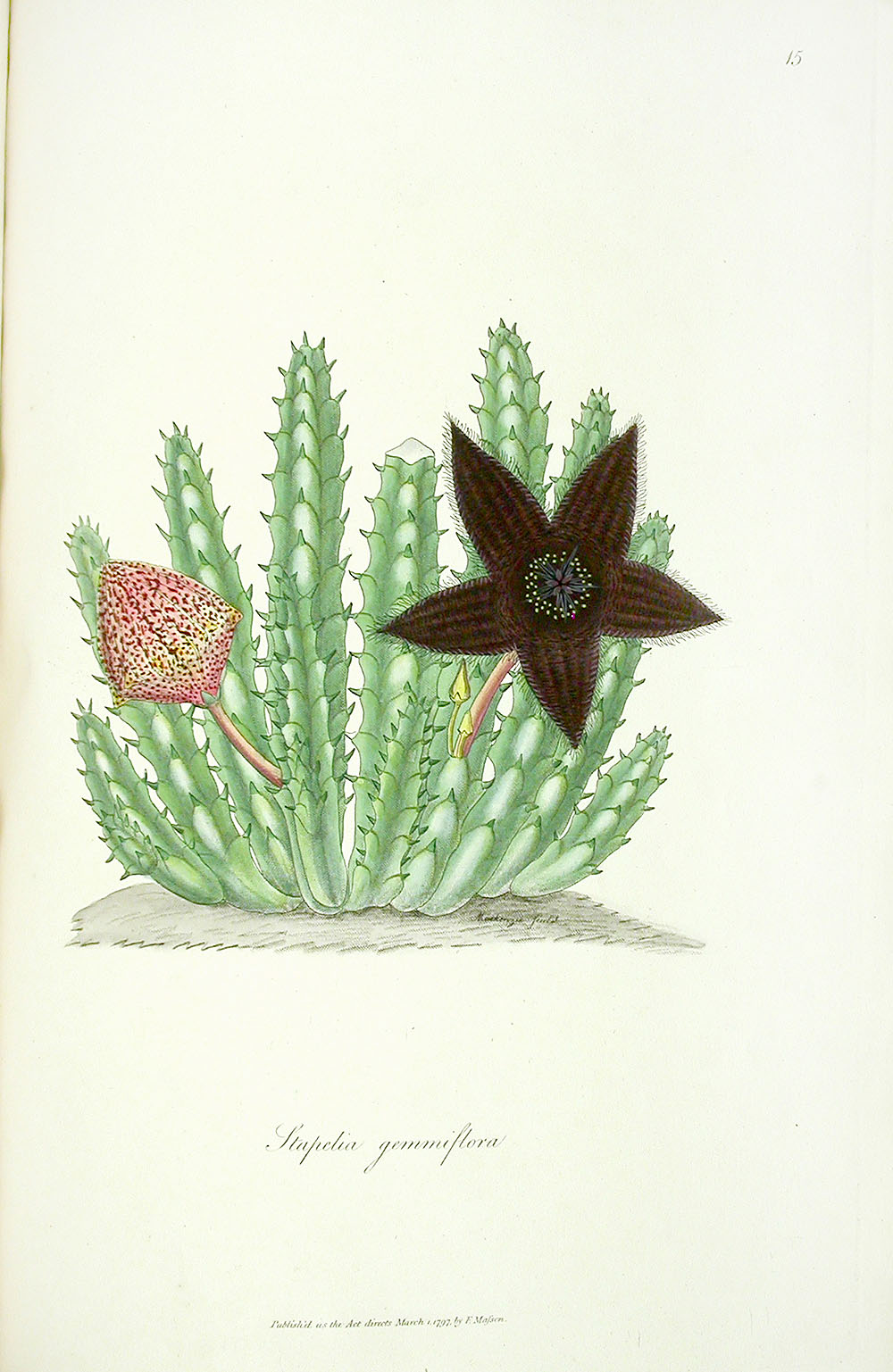
- Tridentea gemmiflora

Scientific classification
- Kingdom: Plantae
- Clade: Tracheophytes
- Clade: Angiosperms
- Clade: Eudicots
- Clade: Asterids
- Order: Gentianales
- Family: Apocynaceae
- Subfamily: Asclepiadoideae
- Tribe: Ceropegieae
- Genus: Tridentea; Haw.

= Tridentea =

Genus of plants

Tridentea is a genus of succulent plant in the family Apocynaceae, endemic to southern Africa.

== Name and history ==
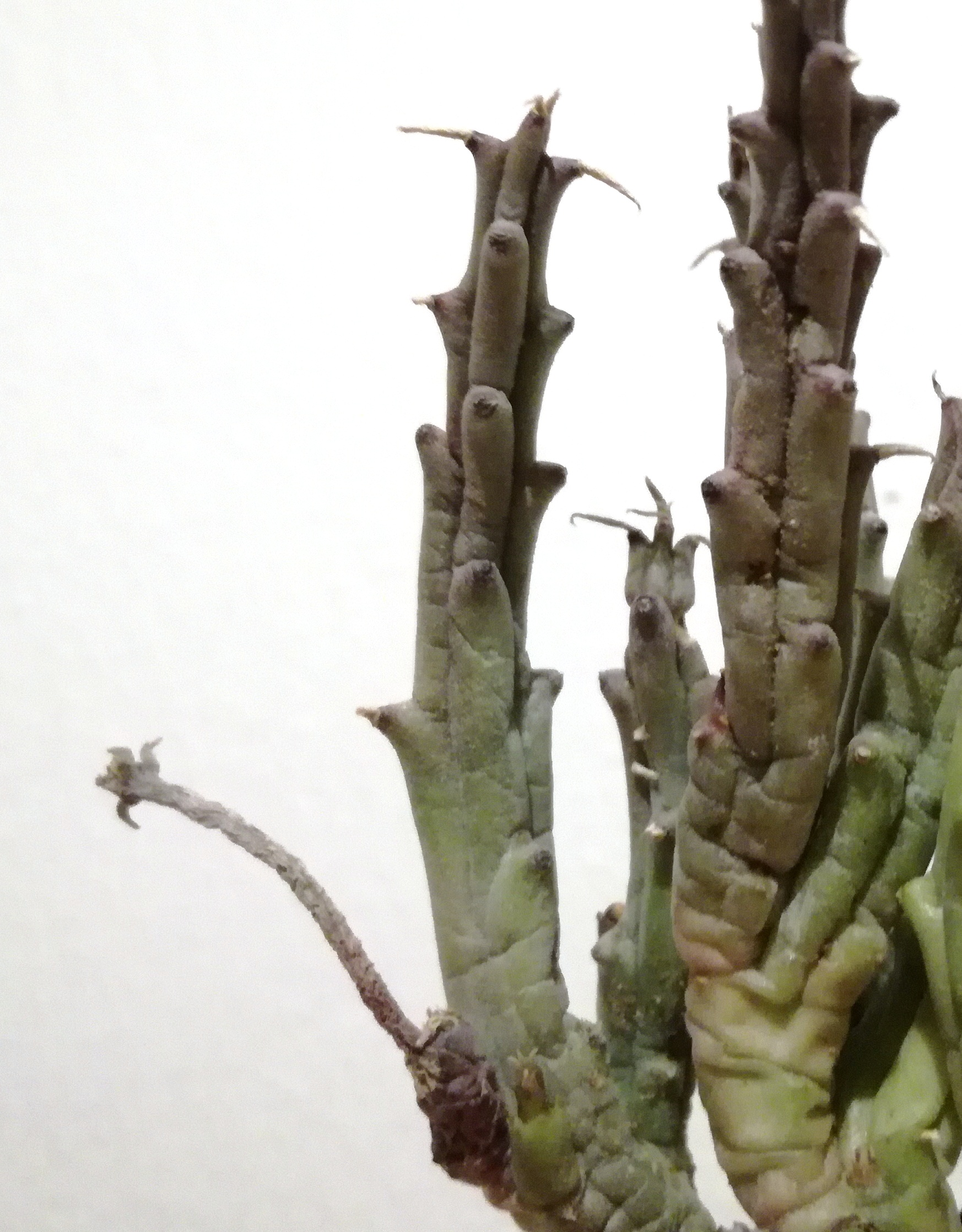
Stem specimen showing leaf remnants and flower stem

Tridentea was first described as a genus in 1812, and its name refers to the three "teeth" on each interstaminal segment of its flower ("tri-" = three; "dentis" = teeth). It was subsequently split, and the genus Tromotriche was created for the ten species which were separated.

== Description ==
Vegetative features

Tridentea stems are typically smooth, soft and appear as roughly four-edged in cross section. The four angles are marked by rows of low tubercle mounds. In young growth, each tubercle bears a small splayed leaf-remnant. These fall off with time though. Each leaf remnant is always surrounded by several minute, fat hairs.

Floral features

Tridentea flowers are flattened, star-shaped, and usually brightly coloured. The most common colouring is a mixed mottling of greenish-yellow with purple. Their inside is usually densely papillate. Flowers appear on minute inflorescences, and each stem bears only one inflorescence, from the stem base.

Species

1. Tridentea aperta (Masson) L.C. Leach - southern Africa
2. Tridentea choanantha (Lavranos & Harry Hall) L.C. Leach - southern Africa
3. Tridentea dwequensis (C.A. Lückh.) L.C. Leach - southern Africa
4. Tridentea gemmiflora (Masson) Haw. - southern Africa
5. Tridentea herrei (Nel) L.C. Leach - southern Africa
6. Tridentea jucunda (N.E. Br.) L.C. Leach - southern Africa
7. Tridentea longii (C.A. Lückh.) L.C. Leach - southern Africa
8. Tridentea longipes (C.A. Lückh.) L.C. Leach - southern Africa
9. Tridentea marientalensis (Nel) L.C. Leach - southern Africa
10. Tridentea pachyrrhiza (Dinter) L.C.Leach - southern Africa
11. Tridentea parvipuncta (N.E. Br.) L.C. Leach - southern Africa
12. Tridentea peculiaris (C.A. Lückh.) L.C. Leach - southern Africa
13. Tridentea pedunculata (Masson) L.C. Leach - southern Africa
14. Tridentea ruschiana (Dinter) L.C. Leach - southern Africa
15. Tridentea umdausensis (Nel) L.C. Leach - southern Africa
16. Tridentea virescens (N.E. Br.) L.C. Leach

formerly included

Tridentea baylissii, syn of Tromotriche baylissii
