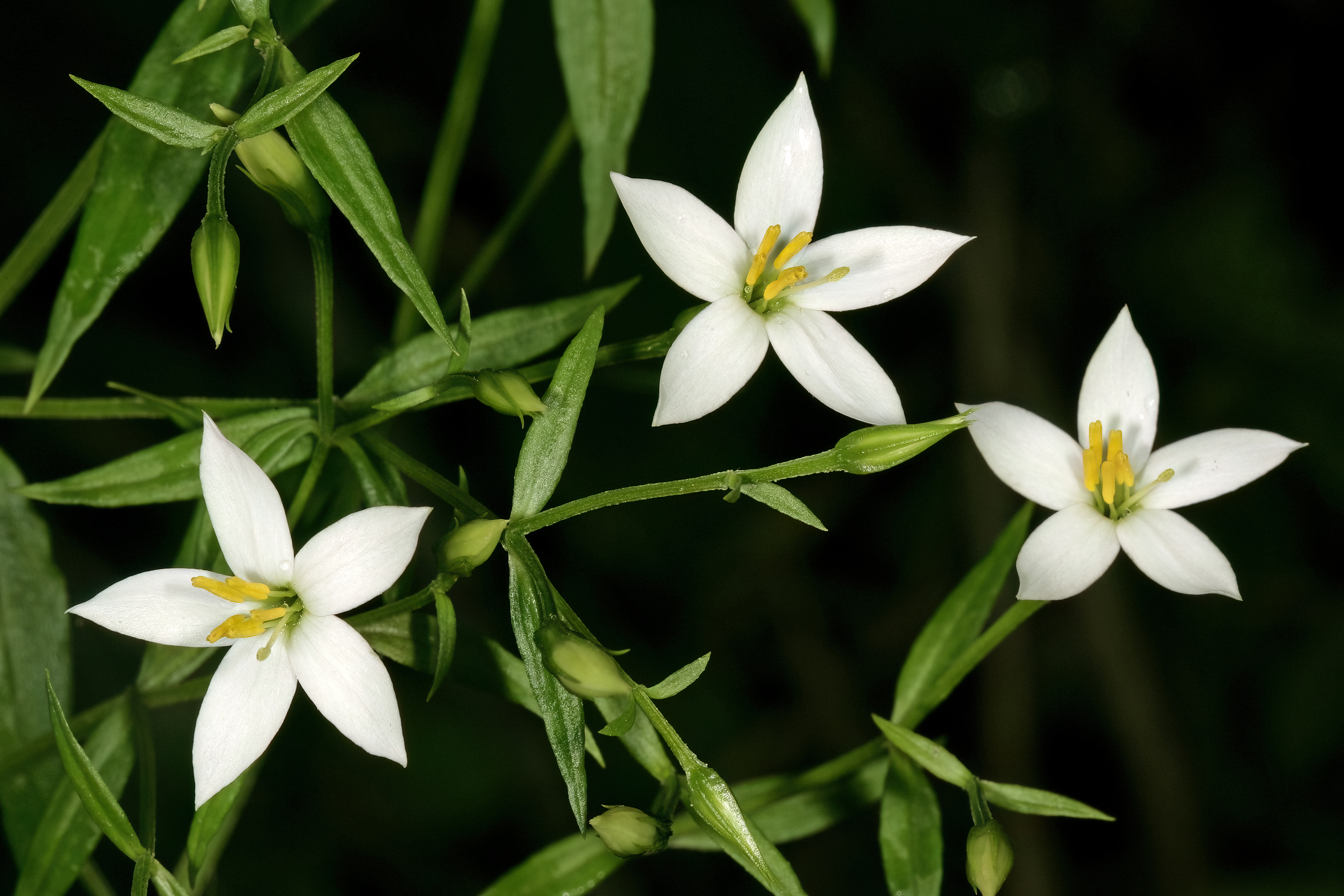

Scientific classification
- Kingdom: Plantae
- Clade: Tracheophytes
- Clade: Angiosperms
- Clade: Eudicots
- Clade: Asterids
- Order: Gentianales
- Family: Gentianaceae
- Genus: Chironia
- Species: C. albiflora

Binomial name
- Chironia albiflora Hilliard, (1983)

= Chironia albiflora =

Species of plant

Chironia albiflora is a plant that is part of the genus Chironia. The species is endemic to South Africa and occurs from Umtamvuna to the Magwa Falls in KwaZulu-Natal and the Eastern Cape. The plant has a range of 470 km^{2}. Five subpopulations are known.
