= Chironia krebsii =

Scientific classification
- Kingdom: Plantae
- Clade: Tracheophytes
- Clade: Angiosperms
- Clade: Eudicots
- Clade: Asterids
- Order: Gentianales
- Family: Gentianaceae
- Genus: Chironia
- Species: C. krebsii

Binomial name
- Chironia krebsii Griseb., (1838)

Synonyms
- Chironia densiflora Scott Elliot

Species of plant

Chironia krebsii, the Kreb's chironia, is a rhizomatous geophyte belonging to the genus Chironia. The species is native to Botswana, Eswatini, Lesotho, Malawi, Mozambique, South Africa, Tanzania and Zimbabwe.

In South Africa, the plant occurs in Gauteng, KwaZulu-Natal, Limpopo, Mpumalanga, Eastern Cape and the Free State.
