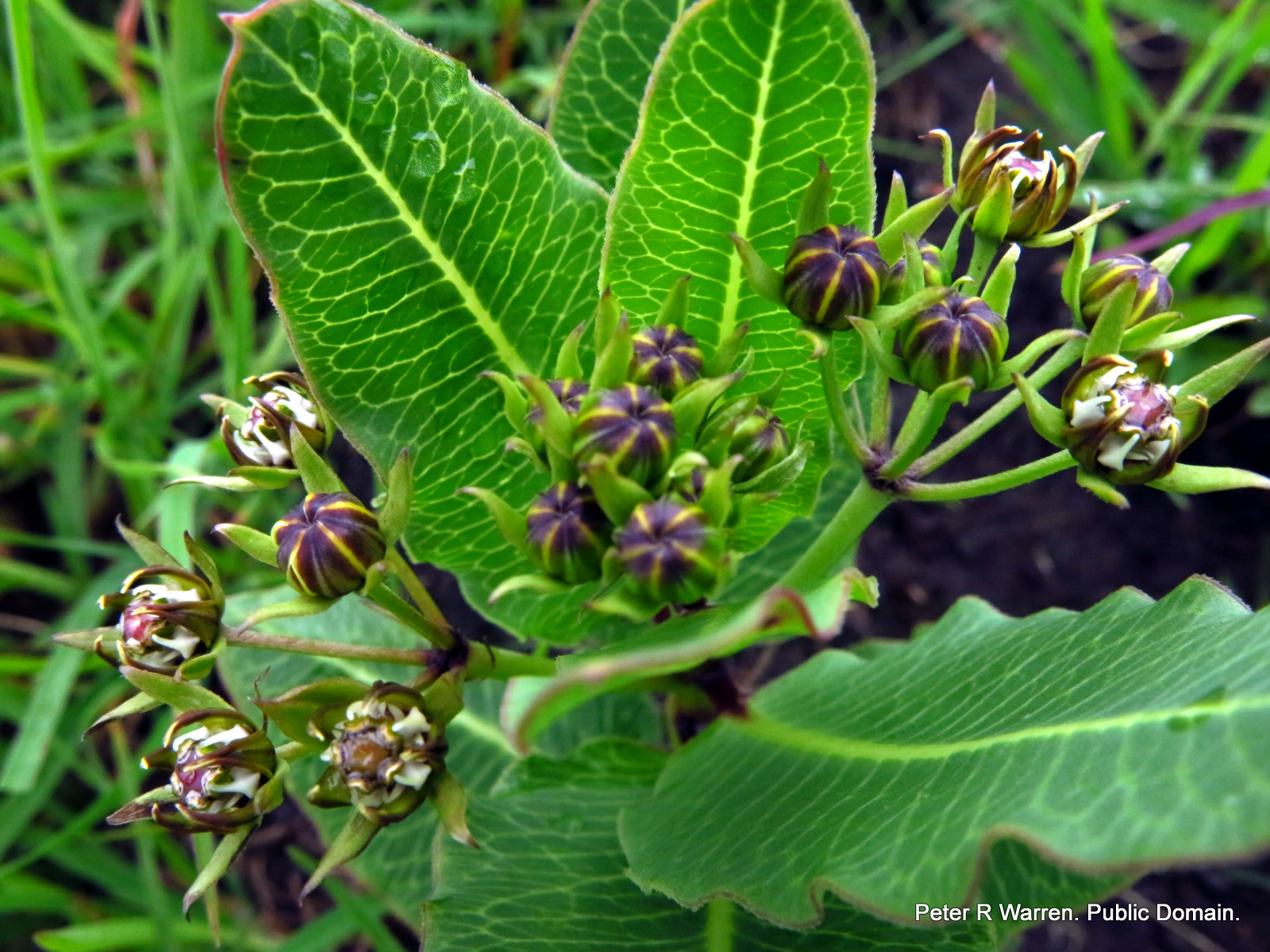
- Woodia verruculosa

Scientific classification
- Kingdom: Plantae
- Clade: Tracheophytes
- Clade: Angiosperms
- Clade: Eudicots
- Clade: Asterids
- Order: Gentianales
- Family: Apocynaceae
- Subfamily: Asclepiadoideae
- Tribe: Asclepiadeae
- Genus: Woodia; Schltr.

= Woodia =

Genus of plants

Woodia is a genus in the family Apocynaceae first described as a genus in 1894. It is native to southern Africa.

== Species ==
1. Woodia mucronata N.E.Br.
2. Woodia singularis N.E. Br.
3. Woodia verruculosa Schltr.
