= Chironia peglerae =

Scientific classification
- Kingdom: Plantae
- Clade: Tracheophytes
- Clade: Angiosperms
- Clade: Eudicots
- Clade: Asterids
- Order: Gentianales
- Family: Gentianaceae
- Genus: Chironia
- Species: C. peglerae

Binomial name
- Chironia peglerae Prain, (1908)

Species of plant

Chironia peglerae is a plant that is part of the genus Chironia. The species is endemic to South Africa and occurs in KwaZulu-Natal and the Eastern Cape.
