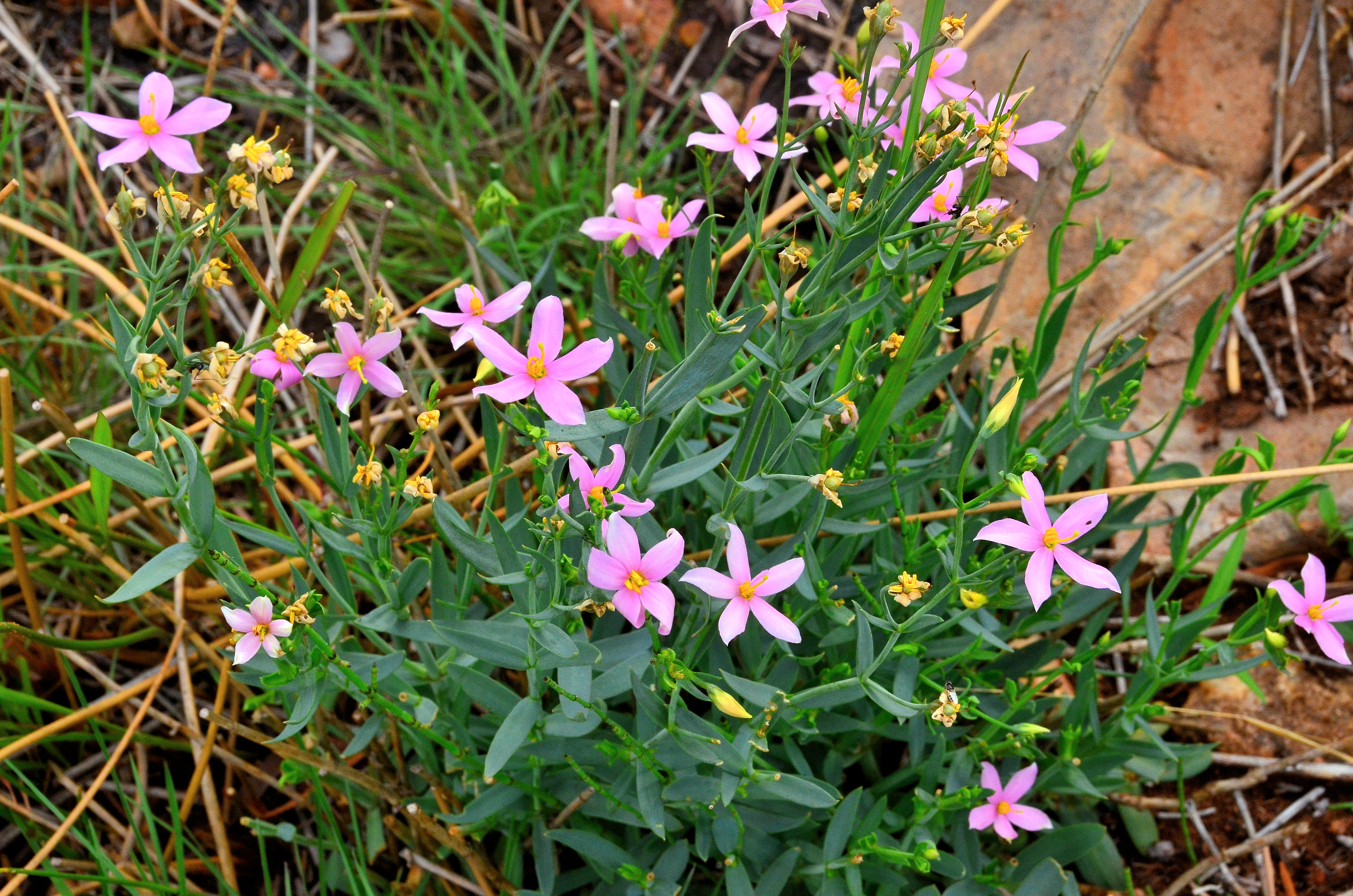
- Chironia palustris

Scientific classification
- Kingdom: Plantae
- Clade: Tracheophytes
- Clade: Angiosperms
- Clade: Eudicots
- Clade: Asterids
- Order: Gentianales
- Family: Gentianaceae
- Tribe: Chironieae
- Subtribe: Chironiinae
- Genus: Chironia; L.

Species
- See text

Synonyms
- Eupodia Raf.; Evalthe Raf.; Onefera Raf.; Plocandra E.Mey.; Roeslinia Moench

= Chironia =

Genus of Gentianaceae plants

Chironia is a genus of flowering plants in the family Gentianaceae, native to southern Africa. It is named after Chiron, the centaur known for his use of medicinal plants, as number of Chironia species are used in traditional medicines.

== Species ==
Currently accepted species include:

- Chironia albiflora Hilliard
- Chironia angolensis Gilg
- Chironia arenaria E.Mey.
- Chironia baccifera L.
- Chironia baumiana Gilg
- Chironia decumbens Levyns
- Chironia elgonensis Bullock
- Chironia erythraeoides Hiern
- Chironia fernandesiana Paiva & I.Nogueira
- Chironia flexuosa Baker
- Chironia gratissima S.Moore
- Chironia jasminoides L.
- Chironia katangensis De Wild.
- Chironia krebsii Griseb.
- Chironia laxa Gilg
- Chironia laxiflora Baker
- Chironia linoides L.
- Chironia melampyrifolia Lam.
- Chironia palustris Burch.
- Chironia peduncularis Lindl.
- Chironia peglerae Prain
- Chironia purpurascens (E.Mey.) Benth. & Hook.f.
- Chironia serpyllifolia Lehm.
- Chironia stokoei I.Verd.
- Chironia tetragona L.f.
