= Chironia serpyllifolia =

Scientific classification
- Kingdom: Plantae
- Clade: Tracheophytes
- Clade: Angiosperms
- Clade: Eudicots
- Clade: Asterids
- Order: Gentianales
- Family: Gentianaceae
- Genus: Chironia
- Species: C. serpyllifolia

Binomial name
- Chironia serpyllifolia Lehm., (1828)

Synonyms
- Chironia ovata Spreng. ex Griseb.; Chironia parvifolia E.Mey.

Species of plant

Chironia serpyllifolia is a plant that is part of the genus Chironia. The species is endemic to South Africa and occurs in the Eastern Cape.
