= Chironia arenaria =

Scientific classification
- Kingdom: Plantae
- Clade: Embryophytes
- Clade: Tracheophytes
- Clade: Spermatophytes
- Clade: Angiosperms
- Clade: Eudicots
- Clade: Asterids
- Order: Gentianales
- Family: Gentianaceae
- Genus: Chironia
- Species: C. arenaria

Binomial name
- Chironia arenaria E.Mey.

Synonyms
- Homotypic Synonyms: Orphium arenarium (E.Mey.) C.Presl; Heterotypic Synonyms: Chironia arenaria var. mediocris (Schoch) Prain; Chironia mediocris Schoch

Species of plant

Chironia arenaria is a species of flowering plant in the family Gentianaceae. The species is endemic to South Africa and occurs in the Northern Cape and the Western Cape.
