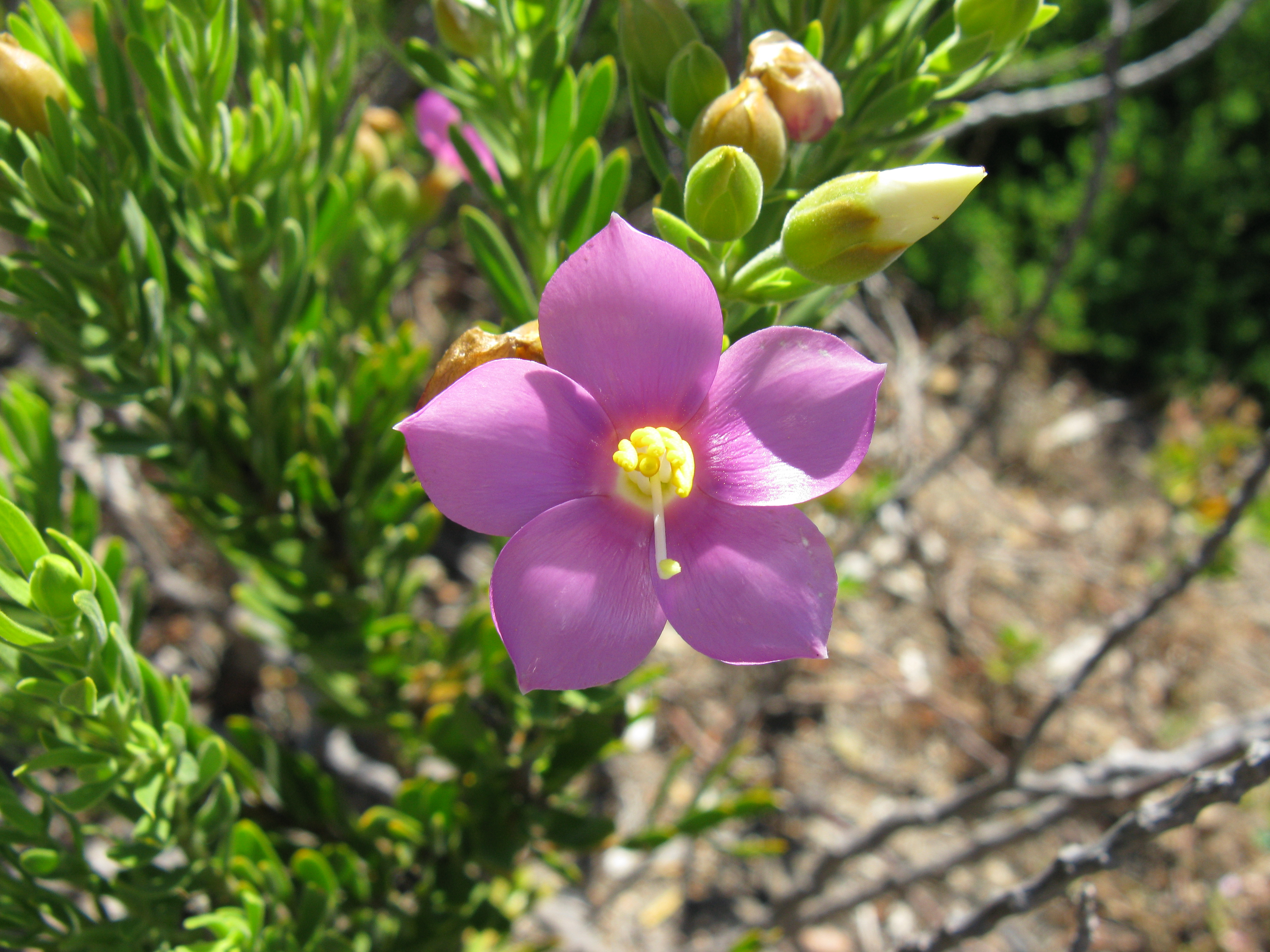

Scientific classification
- Kingdom: Plantae
- Clade: Embryophytes
- Clade: Tracheophytes
- Clade: Spermatophytes
- Clade: Angiosperms
- Clade: Eudicots
- Clade: Asterids
- Order: Gentianales
- Family: Gentianaceae
- Tribe: Chironieae
- Subtribe: Chironiinae
- Genus: Orphium; E.Mey.
- Species: O. frutescens

Binomial name
- Orphium frutescens (L.) E.Mey.

Synonyms
- Valeranda Neck.

= Orphium =

Genus of flowering plants

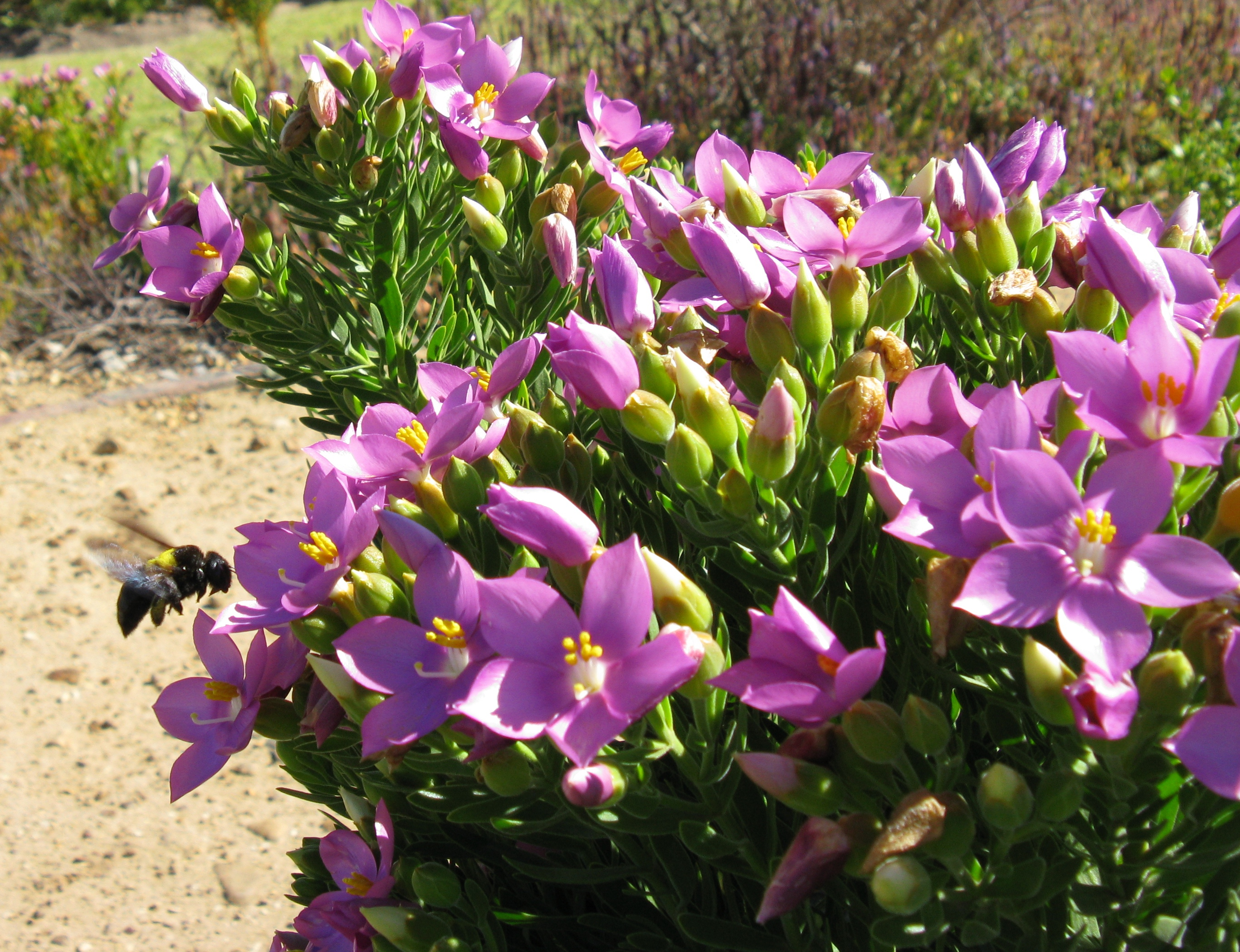
Female carpenter bee, Xylocopa caffra visiting Orphium fruitescens

Orphium is a genus of flowering plant in the Gentian family, Gentianaceae. It is endemic to South Africa. The name derives from the legendary Greek musician Orpheus. The genus contains a single accepted species, Orphium frutescens, commonly known as the sea rose. Orphium arenarium C.Presl has been proposed as another species, but data suggest that it is synonymous with Chironia arenaria E.Mey.

== Description ==
ORPHIUM E. Mey., Comm. Pl. 181 (1837); Hill & Prain in FC. 4, 1: 1095 (1909); Verdoorn in FSA. 26: 236 (1963)

Orphium has the habit of an erect subshrub, virgately branched, more or less pubescent, with branches leafy to the apex. The leaves are opposite, sessile and rather crowded. They are fairly thick, slightly leathery and bluntly linear to narrowly cuneate. Some of the flowers may be solitary, while some are borne in inflorescences in the form of lax cymes, borne terminally or in the axils of upper leaves. The calyx has five lobes fitting loosely round the base of the corolla. The tube is short and campanulate, with an annular, crenulate disk inside at the base. The calyx lobes oblong and mucronate, without a dorsal keel. The corolla is a vibrant candy pink, or rarely white, setting off the vivid yellow anthers. The corolla tube is as long as the calyx or slightly longer. The petals are oblong to nearly circular, slightly longer than tube. The stamens are inserted below mouth of tube. The anthers are erect, with a slight spiral twist. The ovary has a single locule with parallel placentation. The stigma is terminal and peltate. The fruit is a capsule that splits septicidally.

== Habitat and cultivation ==
Orphium frutescens grows in the western coastal regions of Cape Province, South Africa. It is often found on the coast where it tolerates sandy and saline soil. It also tolerates clay as well however. It does best in temperatures from 7 °C (45 °F) to 24 °C (75 °F). It has been under cultivation at the Kew Gardens in London since the late 18th century. The flowers do not release pollen unless they sense the vibrations of carpenter bees native to South Africa and so the plant will not produce seed without manual intervention when it is grown as an exotic.

== Cultural references ==
The common name of Orphium frutescens in Afrikaans is teringbos. This literally means "tuberculosis bush", suggesting that it has been used in folk medicine, but there is no mention of any such application in the major reference.

The sea rose is the titular subject of an Imagist poem published in 1915 by H.D.
