= Pectinaria (plant) =

Scientific classification
- Kingdom: Plantae
- Clade: Tracheophytes
- Clade: Angiosperms
- Clade: Eudicots
- Clade: Asterids
- Order: Gentianales
- Family: Apocynaceae
- Subfamily: Asclepiadoideae
- Tribe: Ceropegieae
- Genus: Pectinaria; Haw. 1819

Genus of plants

Pectinaria is a genus of plants in the family Apocynaceae, first described as a genus in 1819. The entire genus is endemic to South Africa.

Species

1. Pectinaria arcuata N.E.Br. - South Africa
2. Pectinaria articulata (Aiton) Haw. - South Africa
3. Pectinaria asperiflora N.E.Br. - South Africa
4. Pectinaria breviloba R.A.Dyer - Cape Province
5. Pectinaria longipes (N.E.Br.) Bruyns - Cape Province
6. Pectinaria maughanii (R.A.Dyer) Bruyns - Cape Province
7. Pectinaria pillansii N.E.Br. - Cape Province
8. Pectinaria saxatilis N.E.Br. - South Africa
9. Pectinaria stayneri M.Bayer - Cape Province
10. Pectinaria tulipiflora C.A.Lückh. - Cape Province

formerly included

1. Pectinaria exasperata now Stapeliopsis exasperata
