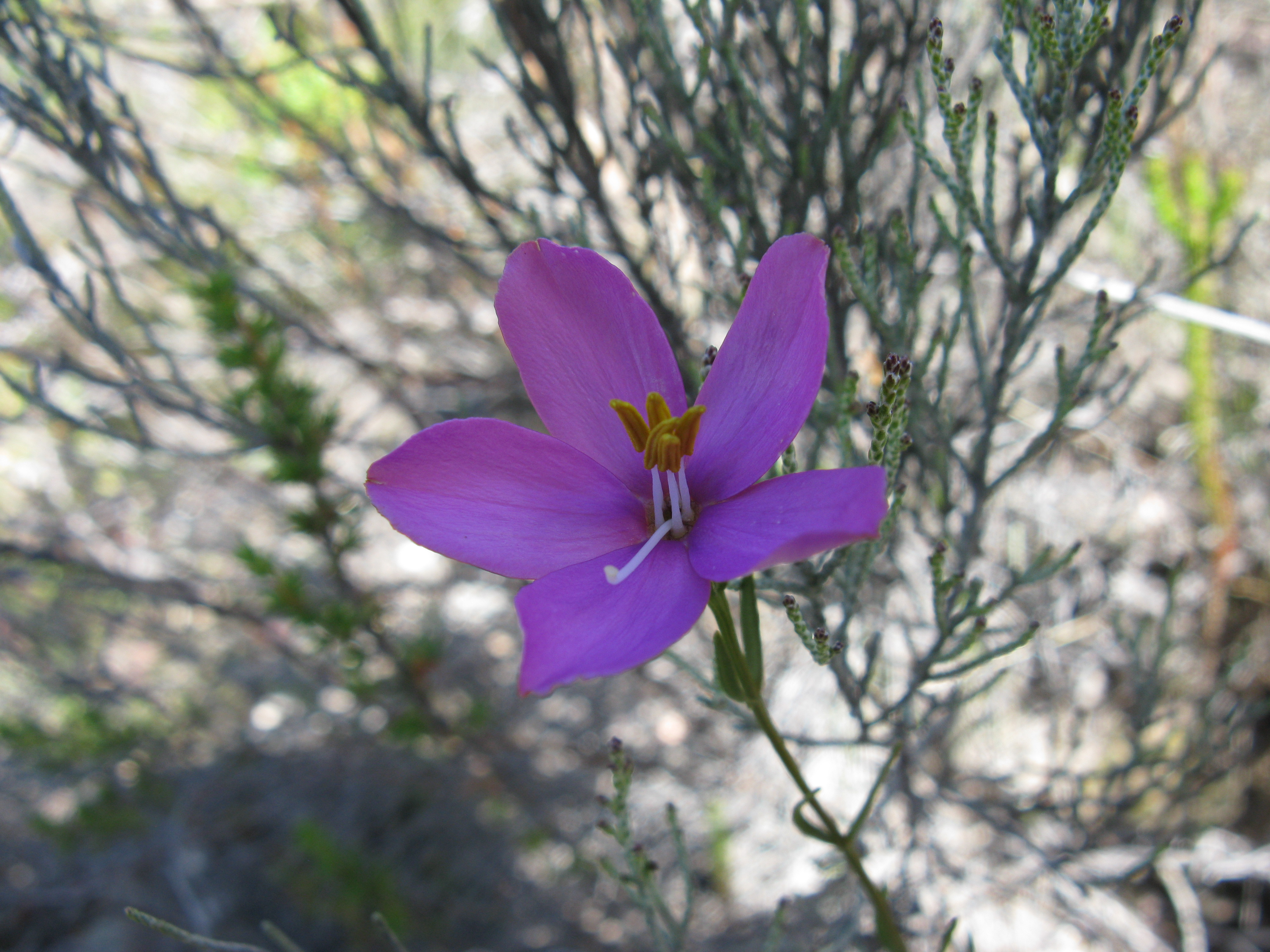

Scientific classification
- Kingdom: Plantae
- Clade: Tracheophytes
- Clade: Angiosperms
- Clade: Eudicots
- Clade: Asterids
- Order: Gentianales
- Family: Gentianaceae
- Genus: Chironia
- Species: C. jasminoides

Binomial name
- Chironia jasminoides L., (1760)

Synonyms
- Chironia cymosa Burm.f.; Chironia nudicaulis L.f.; Evalthe jasminoides (L.) Raf.

= Chironia jasminoides =

Species of plant

Chironia jasminoides is a plant that is part of the genus Chironia. The species is endemic to South Africa and occurs in the Eastern Cape and the Western Cape.
