= Chironia melampyrifolia =

Scientific classification
- Kingdom: Plantae
- Clade: Tracheophytes
- Clade: Angiosperms
- Clade: Eudicots
- Clade: Asterids
- Order: Gentianales
- Family: Gentianaceae
- Genus: Chironia
- Species: C. melampyrifolia

Binomial name
- Chironia melampyrifolia Lam. (1819)

Synonyms
- Chironia glutinosa Paxton; Chironia perfoliata Eckl. ex Griseb.; Chironia speciosa E.Mey.

Species of plant

Chironia melampyrifolia is a plant that is part of the genus Chironia. The species is endemic to South Africa and occurs in the Eastern Cape and the Western Cape.
