= Chironia stokoei =

Scientific classification
- Kingdom: Plantae
- Clade: Tracheophytes
- Clade: Angiosperms
- Clade: Eudicots
- Clade: Asterids
- Order: Gentianales
- Family: Gentianaceae
- Genus: Chironia
- Species: C. stokoei

Binomial name
- Chironia stokoei I.Verd., (1961)

Species of plant

Chironia stokoei is a plant that is part of the genus Chironia. The species is endemic to South Africa and occurs in the Western Cape. The plant is considered rare.
