= Chironia decumbens =

Scientific classification
- Kingdom: Plantae
- Clade: Tracheophytes
- Clade: Angiosperms
- Clade: Eudicots
- Clade: Asterids
- Order: Gentianales
- Family: Gentianaceae
- Genus: Chironia
- Species: C. decumbens

Binomial name
- Chironia decumbens Levyns, (1948)

Synonyms
- Chironia maritima Eckl. ex Griseb.

Species of plant

Chironia decumbens is a plant that is part of the genus Chironia. The species is endemic to South Africa and occurs in the Eastern Cape and the Western Cape.
