= Cordylogyne =

Scientific classification
- Kingdom: Plantae
- Clade: Embryophytes
- Clade: Tracheophytes
- Clade: Spermatophytes
- Clade: Angiosperms
- Clade: Eudicots
- Clade: Asterids
- Order: Gentianales
- Family: Apocynaceae
- Subfamily: Asclepiadoideae
- Tribe: Asclepiadeae
- Genus: Cordylogyne; E.Mey.

Type species
- Cordylogyne globosa E.Mey.

Genus of plants

Cordylogyne is a genus of plants in the family Apocynaceae, established as a genus in 1838. Species of Cordylogyne are native to southern Africa.

== Species ==
As of November 2023, Plants of the World Online accepted the following species:

- Cordylogyne argillicola Dinter – central Namibia
- Cordylogyne globosa E.Mey. – southern Africa
