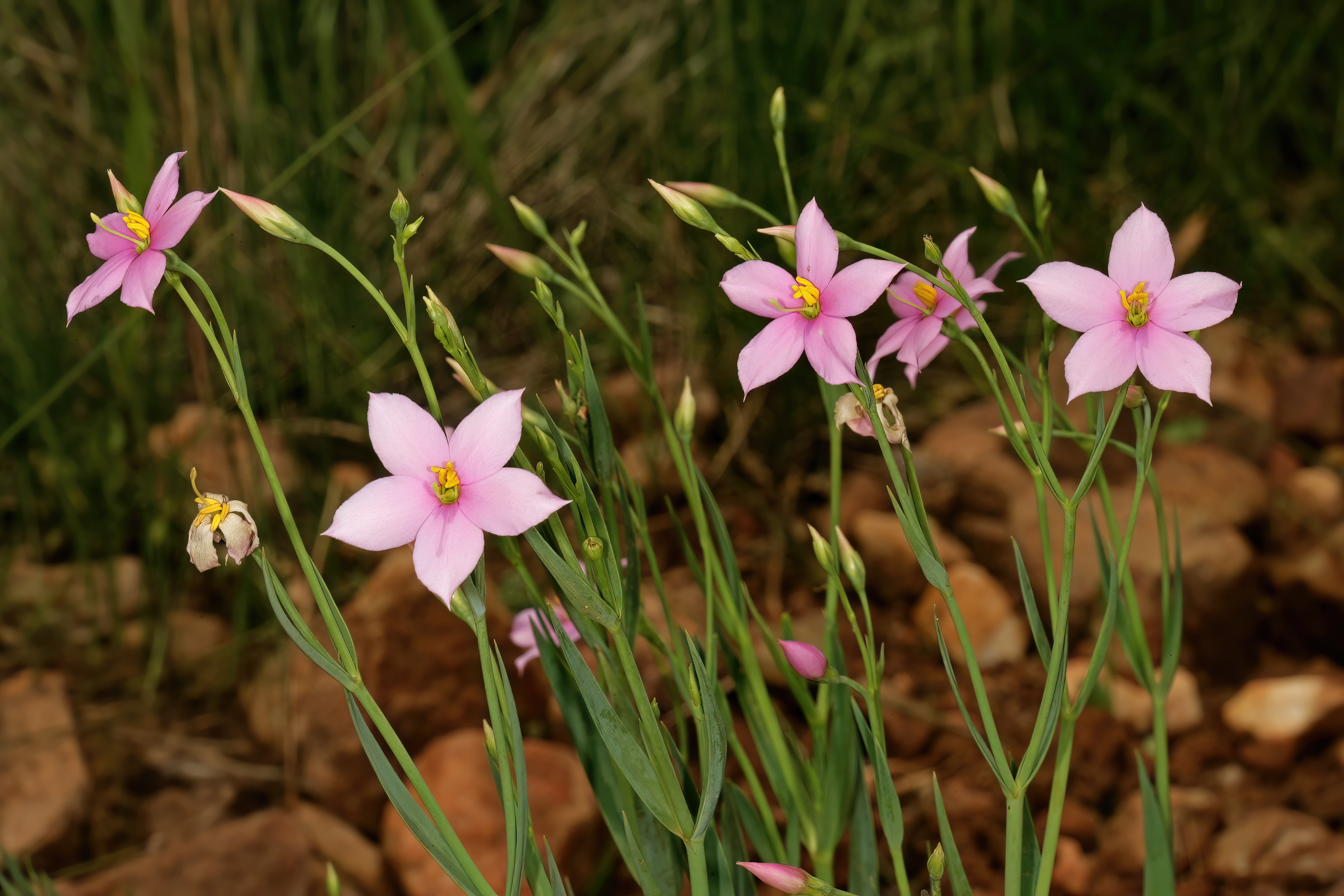

Scientific classification
- Kingdom: Plantae
- Clade: Tracheophytes
- Clade: Angiosperms
- Clade: Eudicots
- Clade: Asterids
- Order: Gentianales
- Family: Gentianaceae
- Genus: Chironia
- Species: C. palustris

Binomial name
- Chironia palustris Burch., (1824)

= Chironia palustris =

Species of plant

Chironia palustris, the Transvaal chironia or cerise stars, is a plant that is part of the genus Chironia. The species is native to Angola, Botswana, Democratic Republic of the Congo, Eswatini, Lesotho, Mozambique, South Africa, Tanzania, Zambia and Zimbabwe. In South Africa, the plant occurs in all provinces.
