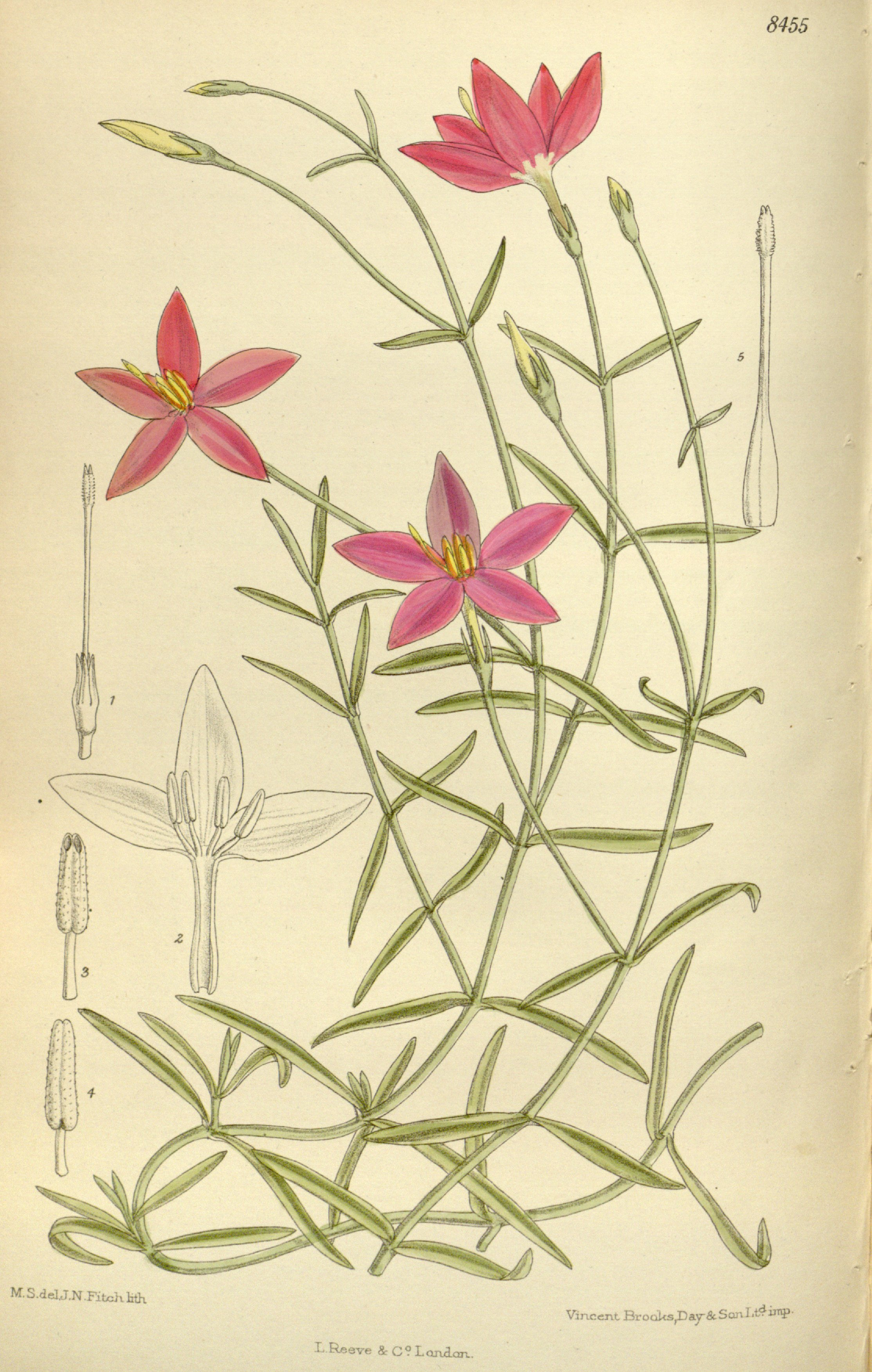

Scientific classification
- Kingdom: Plantae
- Clade: Tracheophytes
- Clade: Angiosperms
- Clade: Eudicots
- Clade: Asterids
- Order: Gentianales
- Family: Gentianaceae
- Genus: Chironia
- Species: C. laxa

Binomial name
- Chironia laxa Gilg, (1898)

Synonyms
- Chironia schlechteri Schoch

= Chironia laxa =

Species of plant

Chironia laxa is a plant that is part of the genus Chironia. The species is endemic to South Africa and occurs in KwaZulu-Natal and the Eastern Cape.
