= Fanninia =

Scientific classification
- Kingdom: Plantae
- Clade: Tracheophytes
- Clade: Angiosperms
- Clade: Eudicots
- Clade: Asterids
- Order: Gentianales
- Family: Apocynaceae
- Subfamily: Asclepiadoideae
- Tribe: Asclepiadeae
- Genus: Fanninia; Harv.
- Species: F. caloglossa

Binomial name
- Fanninia caloglossa Harv.

Genus of flowering plants

Fanninia is a species of plants in the family Apocynaceae first described as a genus in 1868. It contains only one known species, Fanninia caloglossa, a tuberous geophyte native to the Eastern Cape, Free State, and KwaZulu-Natal provinces of South Africa.
