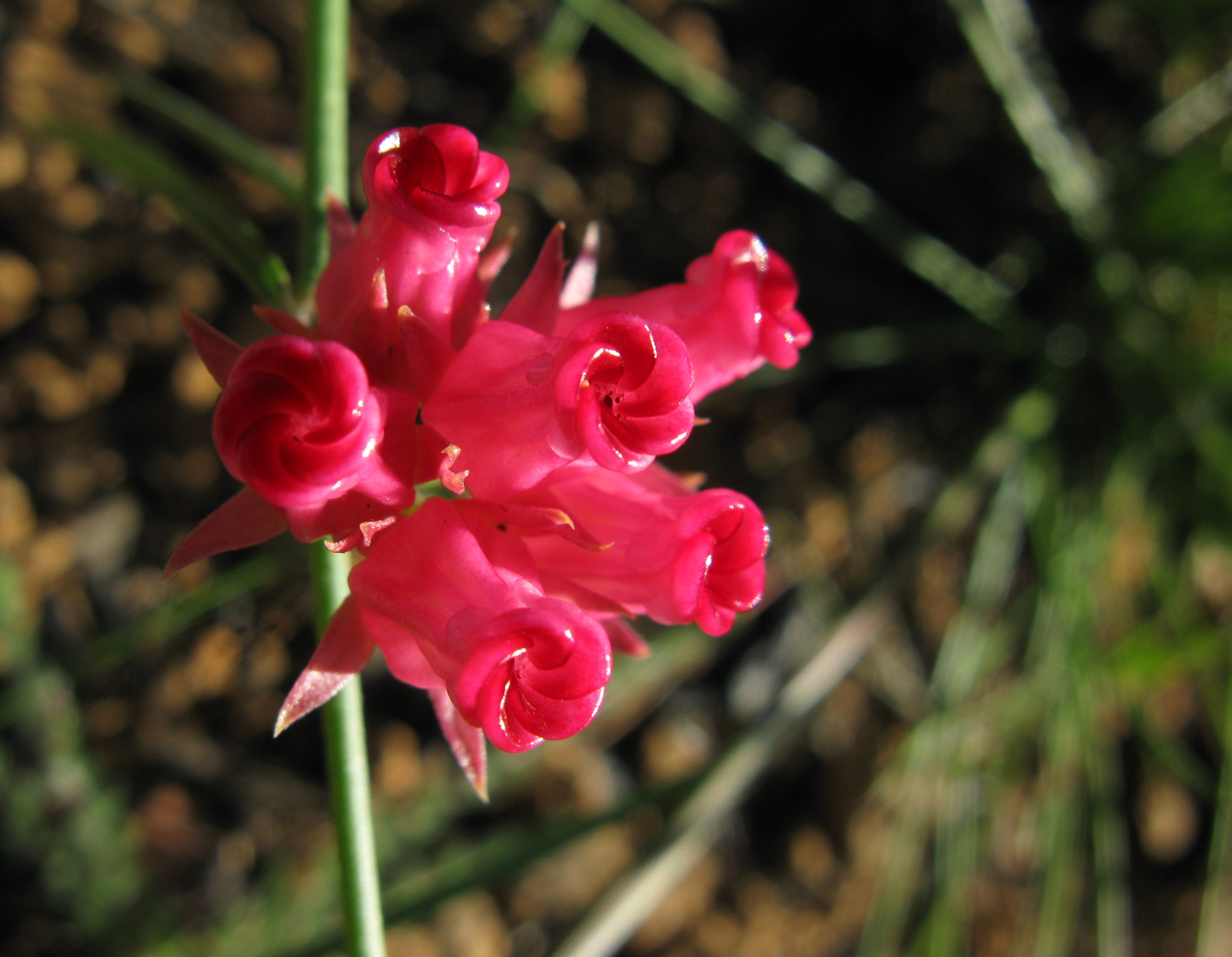
- Microloma tenuifolium inflorescence

Scientific classification
- Kingdom: Plantae
- Clade: Tracheophytes
- Clade: Angiosperms
- Clade: Eudicots
- Clade: Asterids
- Order: Gentianales
- Family: Apocynaceae
- Subfamily: Asclepiadoideae
- Tribe: Asclepiadeae
- Genus: Microloma; R.Br.

= Microloma =

Genus of flowering plants

Microloma is a small genus of Ceropegia-like twiners and twiggy bushes occurring in mainly arid or fynbos regions in South Africa. They are generally undistinguished when not in bloom, but the flowers of most species are incongruously decorative.

== Overview ==
Microloma R. Br. in Mem. Werner. Soc.1: 53, (1809), is a genus of herbaceous perennial, dicotyledonous plants. Microloma species were originally described as members of the genus Ceropegia, in the family Asclepiadaceae, but Brown separated them and created a new genus, still in the family Asclepiadaceae. More recently the Asclepiadaceae have been reclassified as the subfamily Asclepiadoideae of the dogbane family Apocynaceae.

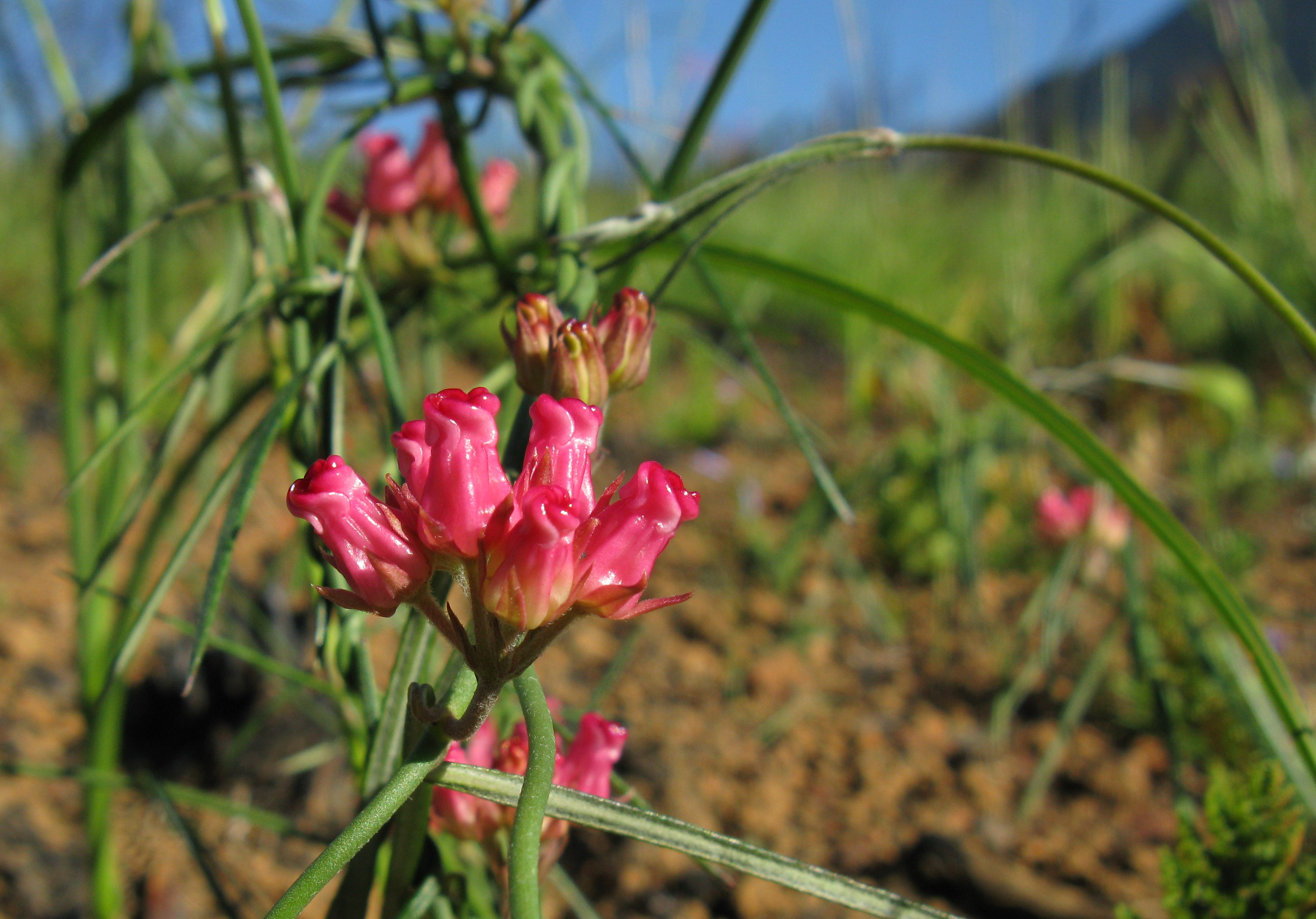
Microloma tenuifolium growing in a tangle without support where fire had removed fynbos scrub a year earlier. The stems would normally be twining around the branches of perennials.

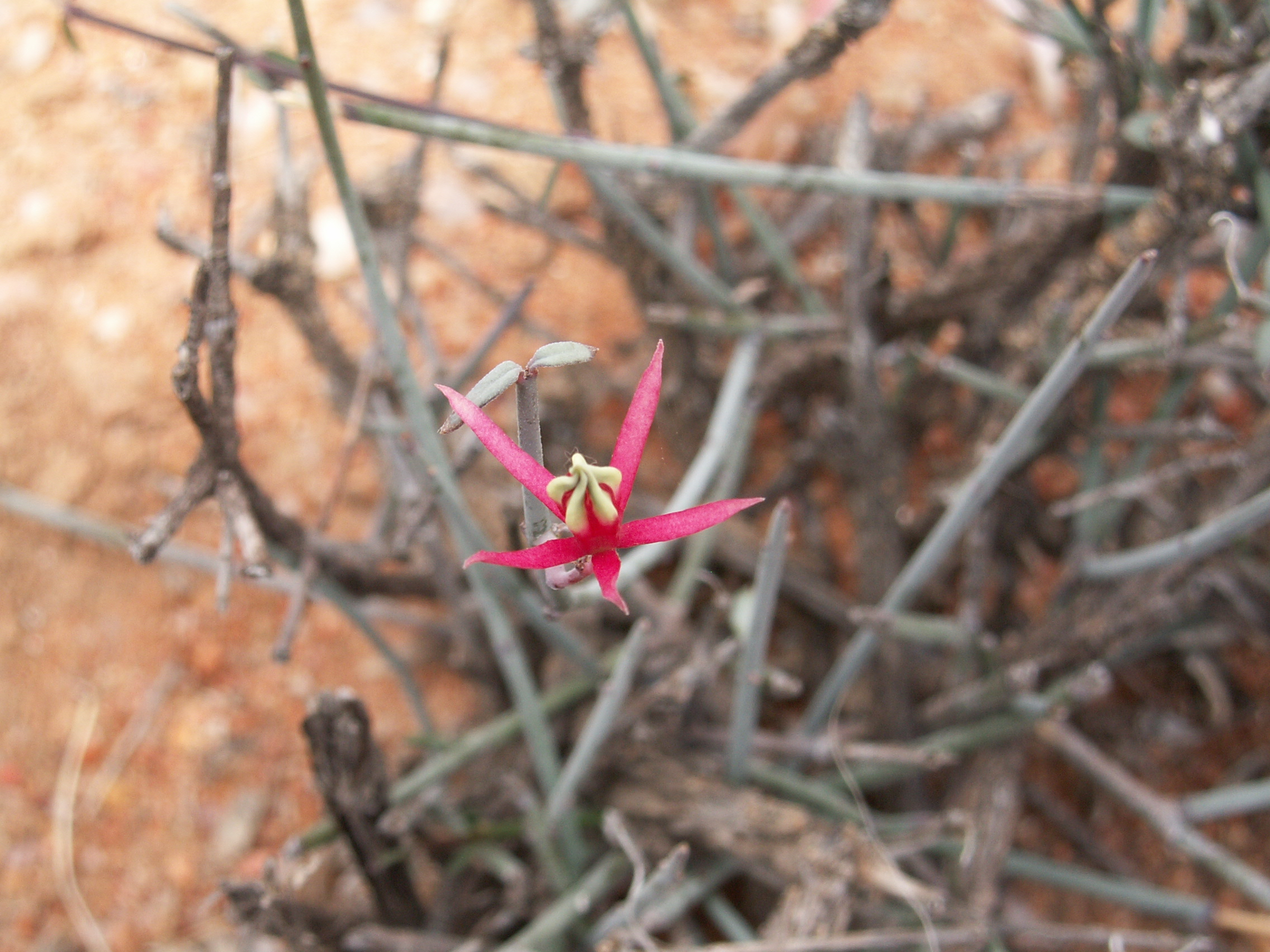
Microloma calycinum, a species from an arid region

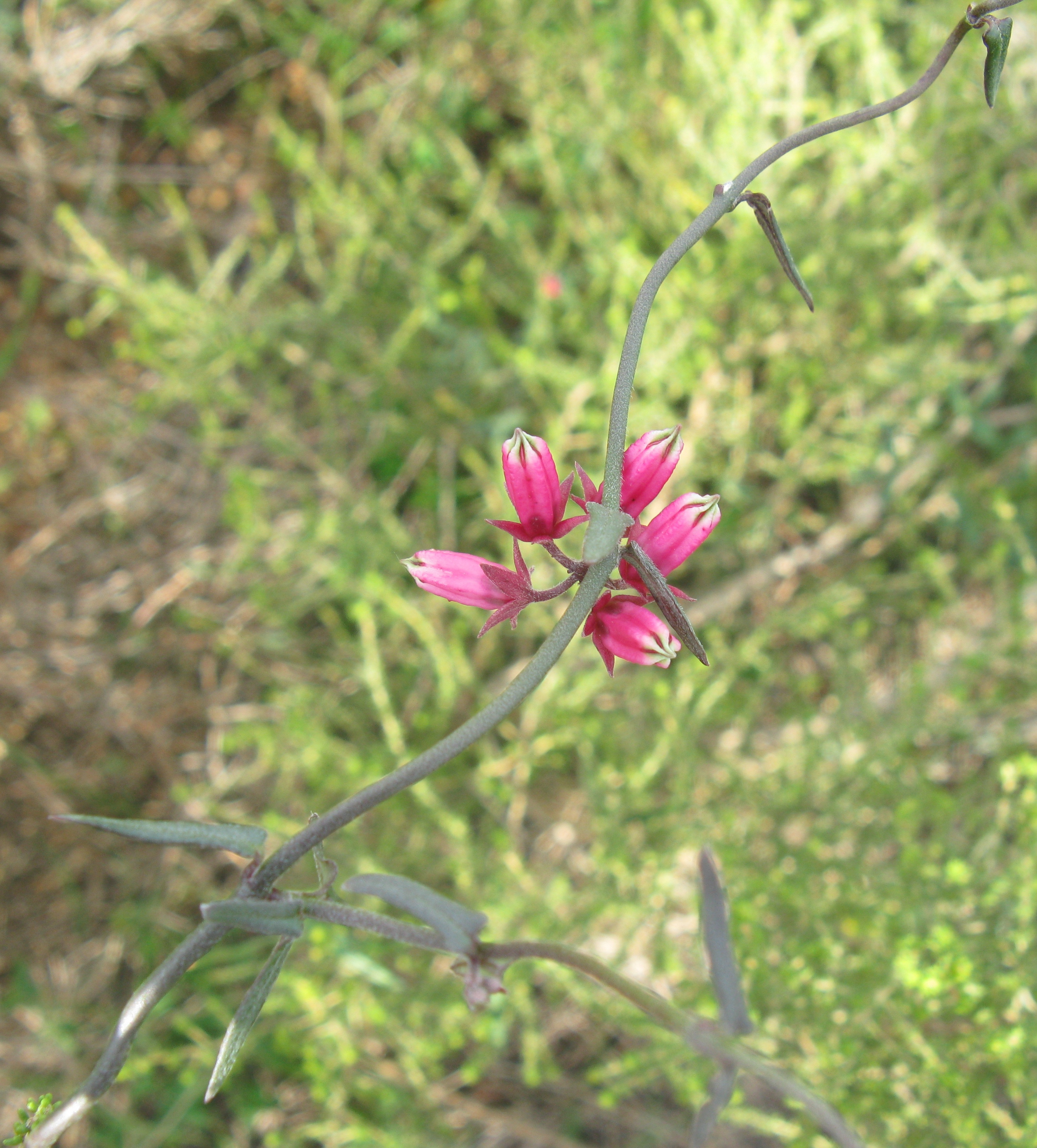
Microloma sagittatum in flower, twining in mixed fynbos thicket

Common names of Microloma species are various and regional; Manning mentions "wax creeper" and "melktou" (literally "milk-string", a curious name because the plants do not in general produce latex). Other names include "wax twiner" and "bokhorinkies" (literally "little goat- or antelope-horns, a reference to the shape of the fruit). Marloth said: "The Dutch name is suikerkannetje, as the flower produces so much nectar that in the morning one may shake out a drop of it from each flower." "Suikerkannetje" means little "sugar-can". Marloth adds:"In spite of this proffered feast, visitors are rare and one must have much patience if one wants to know who the visitors are that respond to the invitation — they are small moths and tiny butterflies like the Lycaena or still smaller kinds." More recent work however has shown that such insects are incidental visitors; the main pollinators are sunbirds; the pollinia stick to their tongues in a striking example of specialised mutualism.

Microlomas are perennials. Some are delicate twiners and some are shrublets; Microloma massonii (now = Microloma armatum) is densely branched, with the branches so spiny at their tips, that the colloquial name is "ystervarkbossie", meaning "porcupine bush". Unlike many of the Asclepiadoideae, Microlomas have clear sap without any conspicuous latex. Their leaves are opposite, usually sessile and simple. The inflorescences are umbel-like cymes, borne outside the axils. The flowers are usually red or reddish, sometimes yellow, orange or pink. There are five sepals, with the corolla typically longer than the calyx. The five petals are usually glossily waxy, consistently with some of the common names. The corolla tube is usually pentagonal and urn-shaped or oblong, with tufts of downward-pointing hairs low down in the tube opposite the lobes. The petals are arranged spirally and practically close the tube. The stamens arise from the base of the corolla. The anthers generally are sagittate at their bases, and bear pollinia.

Most species grow a fascicle of fleshy roots around the base of the stem and thus may shed shoots and leaves in dry seasons or when fires pass over.

== Traditional uses ==
An infusion of the fleshy root fascicle of Microloma saggittatum has been used in traditional medicine for relief of griping pains in the abdomen. The infusion is red in colour. If water is unavailable the patient may chew a piece of the root instead.

Country children would suck the very sweet nectar from the flower clusters of some species. This was rather as a treat or a whim than as a serious contribution to their nutrition, because the plants are small and not usually plentiful.

Species

1. Microloma burchellii N.E.Br. - South Africa
2. Microloma calycinum E.Mey. - near Goedemanskraal in Western Cape Province
3. Microloma gibbosum N.E.Br. - South Africa
4. Microloma glabratum E.Mey. - Western Cape Province
5. Microloma hereroense Wanntorp - Namibia
6. Microloma incanum Decne.- South Africa
7. Microloma longitubum Schltr. - Namibia
8. Microloma namaquense H.Bol. - Namibia, Western Cape Province
9. Microloma penicillatum Schltr. - Damaraland in Namibia
10. Microloma poicilanthum Huber - Damaraland in Namibia
11. Microloma sagittatum (L.) R.Br. - South Africa
12. Microloma tenuifolium (L.) K.Schum. - South Africa

formerly included

- Microloma pyrotechnicum (Forssk.) Spreng, synonym of Leptadenia pyrotechnica (Forssk.) Decne.
