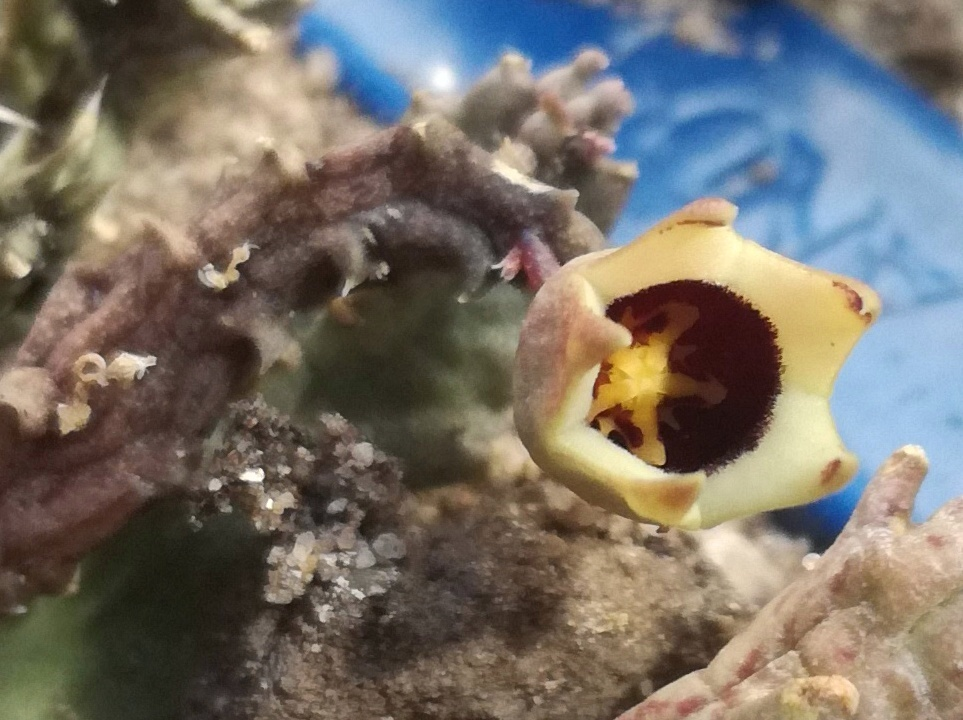
- Ophionella arcuata flower

Scientific classification
- Kingdom: Plantae
- Clade: Tracheophytes
- Clade: Angiosperms
- Clade: Eudicots
- Clade: Asterids
- Order: Gentianales
- Family: Apocynaceae
- Subfamily: Asclepiadoideae
- Tribe: Ceropegieae
- Genus: Ophionella; Bruyns
- Species: O. arcuata

Binomial name
- Ophionella arcuata (N.E.Br.) Bruyns

Synonyms
- Pectinaria arcuata N.E.Br.

= Ophionella =

Genus of flowering plants

Ophionella is a group of plants in the family Apocynaceae first described as a genus in 1981. It contains only one accepted species, Ophionella arcuata, native to Eastern Cape Province of South Africa.
