= Neville Stuart Pillans =

South African botanist (1884-1964)

- Born: 2 May 1884; Rosebank, Cape Colony
- Died: 23 March 1964 (aged 79); Plumstead, Cape Town
- Known for: Collecting plants, especially Stapeliinae
- Scientific career
- Fields: Botany
- Author abbrev. (botany): Pillans

Neville Stuart Pillans (2 May 1884 - 23 March 1964) was a South African botanist.

== Biography ==
Neville Stuart Pillans was the only son of Eustace Pillans, another South African botanist.

== Work life ==
He joined the Bolus Herbarium in 1918 and retired from it in 1952. In 1911, he worked with Henry Harold Welch Pearson in choosing the Kirstenbosch National Botanical Garden site.

== Publications ==
- 1928. The African genera and species of Restionaceae. Transactions of the Royal Society of South Africa.
- 1942. The genus Phylica. Journal of South African Botany.
- 1947. A revision of Bruniaceae. Journal of South African Botany.
- 1950. A revision of Agathosma. Journal of South African Botany.

== Organisations ==
He was a member of the Royal Society of South Africa for a few years.

== Plants named in his honour ==
- the genus Nevillea (Steud.) H.P.Linder
- the genus Pillansia L.Bolus
- the species Aloidendron pillansii L.Guthrie
- the species Gasteria pillansii Bolus & L.Bolus
- the species Eucomis pillansii
- the species Huernia pillansii
- the species Stapelia pillansii
- the species Duvalia pillansii
- the species Erica nevillei

== Legacy ==
Alain Campbell White and Boyd L. Sloane in The Stapelieae described Pillans as "the most eminent collector of Stapeliads in the eventful history of the tribe".

Plants collected by him are found in the Bolus Herbarium, the Moss Herbarium of the University of the Witwatersrand, the Compton Herbarium in Cape Town, and the National Herbarium in the Pretoria National Botanical Garden.
