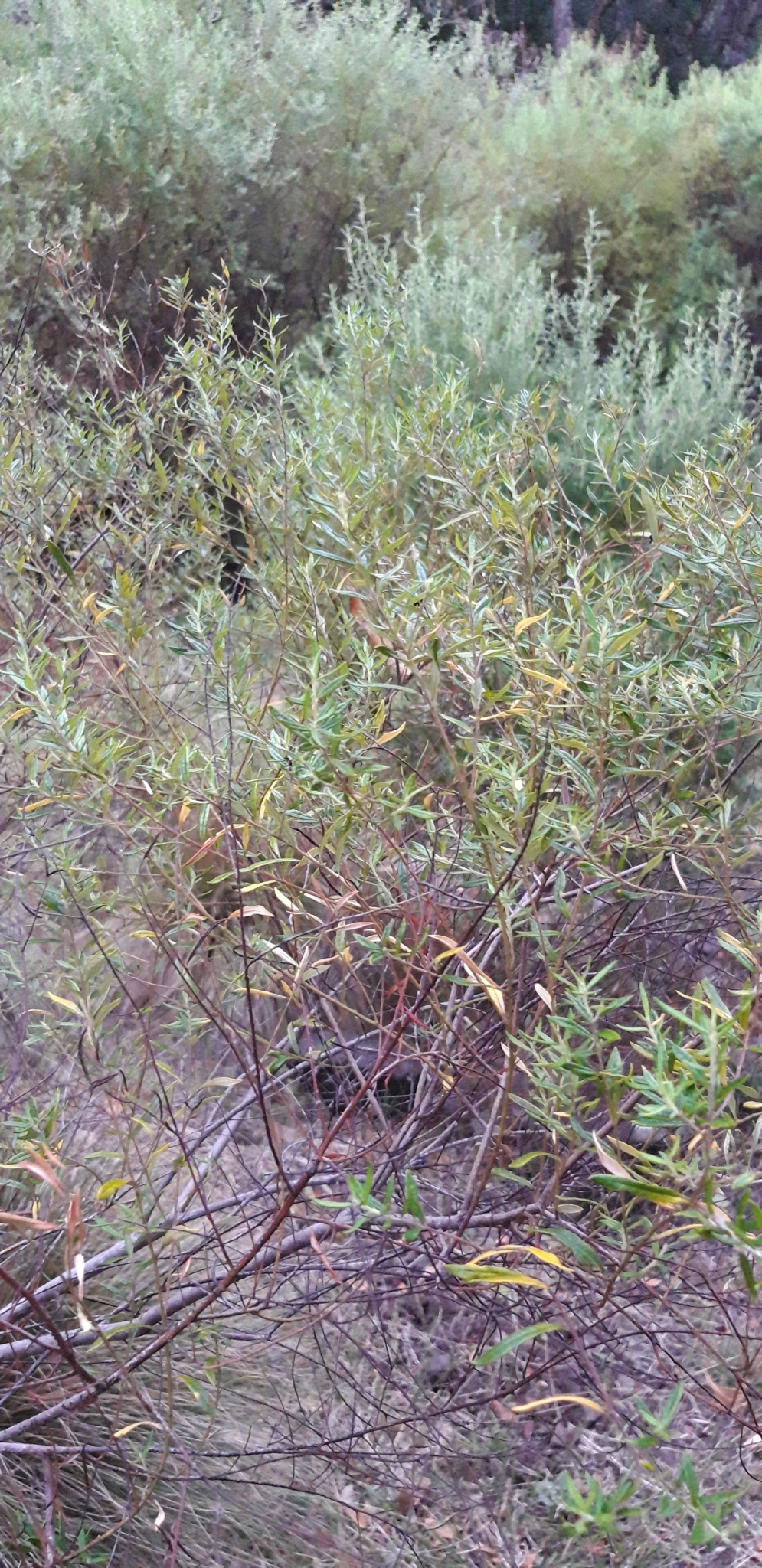

Conservation status
- Critically Endangered (IUCN 3.1)

Scientific classification
- Kingdom: Plantae
- Clade: Embryophytes
- Clade: Tracheophytes
- Clade: Spermatophytes
- Clade: Angiosperms
- Clade: Eudicots
- Clade: Rosids
- Order: Rosales
- Family: Rhamnaceae
- Genus: Phylica
- Species: P. polifolia

Binomial name
- Phylica polifolia (Vahl) Pillans

Synonyms
- Phylica ramosissima DC.; Phylica rosmarinifolia Thunb., nom. illeg. homonym. post.; Phylica rosmarinifolia Roxb., sensu auct.; Phylica thymifolia Vent.; Rhamnus polifolia Vahl (1794); Soulangia thymifolia (Vent.) Brongn.; Trichocephalus ramosissimus (DC.) G.Don

= Phylica polifolia =

Species of flowering plant

Phylica polifolia, also called rosemary or Saint Helena rosemary, is a species of flowering plant in the family Rhamnaceae. It is endemic to Saint Helena. Its natural habitats are rocky areas and rocky shores.

The species was first described as Rhamnus polifolia by Martin Vahl in 1794. In 1942 Neville Stuart Pillans placed the species in genus Phylica as P. polifolia.
