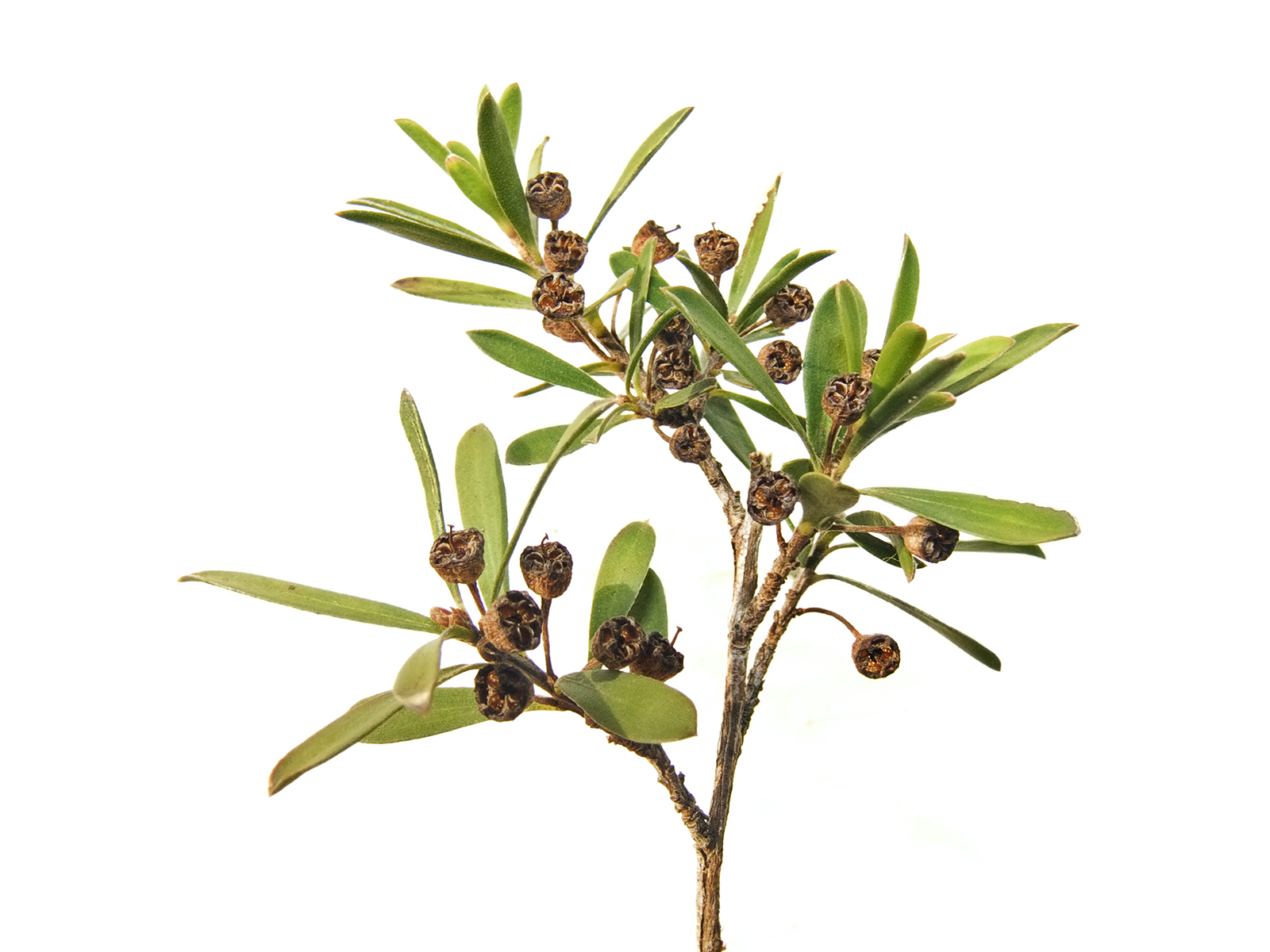
- Kunzea phylicoides

Scientific classification
- Kingdom: Plantae
- Clade: Tracheophytes
- Clade: Angiosperms
- Clade: Eudicots
- Clade: Rosids
- Order: Myrtales
- Family: Myrtaceae
- Genus: Kunzea
- Species: K. phylicoides

Binomial name
- Kunzea phylicoides (A.Cunn. ex Schauer) Druce

Synonyms
- Baeckea phylicoides A.Cunn. ex Schauer; Leptospermum phylicoides (A.Cunn. ex Schauer) Cheel; Leptospermum phylicoideum Cheel orth. var.; Kunzea ericoides auct. non (A.Rich.) Joy Thomps.

= Kunzea phylicoides =

Slender burgan

Species of flowering plant

Kunzea phylicoides, commonly known as the slender burgan, is a flowering plant in the myrtle family, Myrtaceae and is endemic to south-eastern mainland Australia. It is an erect shrub with drooping branches, fibrous or corky bark, bright green, narrow leaves and clusters of white flowers in spring.

== Description ==
Kunzea phylicoides is a graceful, erect shrub which typically grows to a height of 3 m (10 ft) and has drooping branches and fibrous or corky bark. The leaves are linear to narrow lance-shaped, 7–25 mm (0.3–1 in) long and 1–2 mm (0.04–0.08 in) wide on a petiole 0.5–1 mm (0.02–0.04 in) long. The flowers are arranged singly or in groups of up to three in the upper leaf axils, each flower on a pedicel 3–6 mm (0.1–0.2 in) long. There are no bracts or bracteoles at the base of the flower. The sepals are green, reddish near the base, triangular and 1–1.5 mm (0.04–0.06 in) long. The petals are white, more or less round, 1.5–2.5 mm (0.06–0.1 in) long and there usually 25 to 35 white stamens that are 1–4 mm (0.04–0.2 in) long with some shorter than the petals. The style is 1.5–2.5 mm (0.059–0.098 in) long. Flowering mostly occurs from November to February and the fruit is 2.5–4 mm (0.1–0.2 in) long, 3–5 mm (0.1–0.2 in) wide and not woody.

Kunzea phylicoides is similar K. ericoides but has a more graceful habit, leafy groups of flowers and about twice as many stamens. It sometimes hybridises with K. peduncularis.

The National Herbarium of New South Wales lists K. phylicoides as Kunzea ericoides.

== Taxonomy and naming ==
Slender burgan was first formally described in 1843 by Johannes Conrad Schauer after an unpublished description by Allan Cunningham who gave it the name Baeckea phylicoides. The description was published in Wilhelm Walpers's Repertorium Botanices Systematicae. In 1917, George Claridge Druce changed the name to Kunzea phylicoides. The specific epithet (phylicoides) refers to a similarity of this species to others in the genus Phylica.

== Distribution ==
Kunzea phylicoides occurs in New South Wales, the Australian Capital Territory and along the Snowy River and its major tributaries in Victoria to near Buchan.
