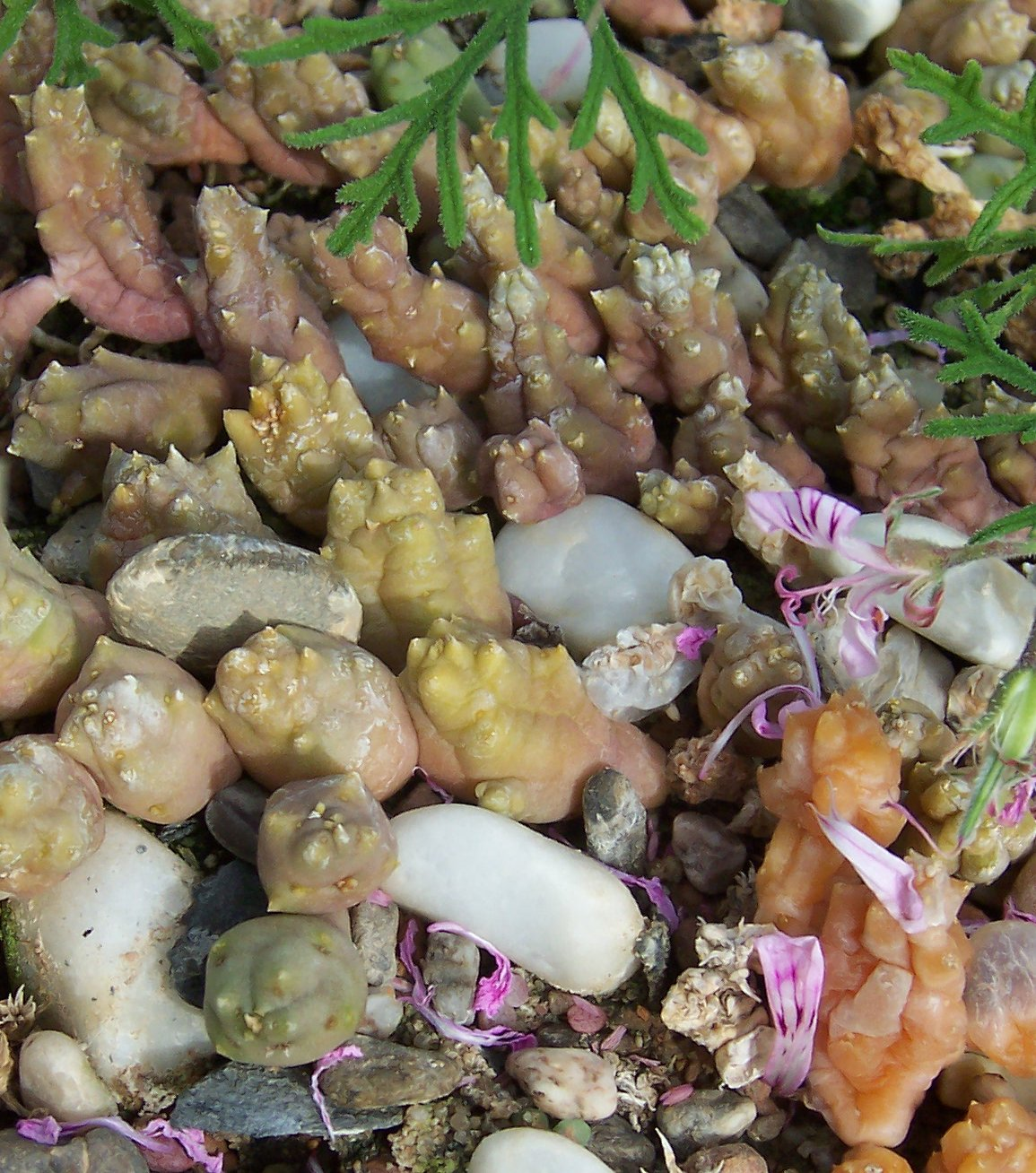
- Huernia macrocarpa var. penzigii

Scientific classification
- Kingdom: Plantae
- Clade: Tracheophytes
- Clade: Angiosperms
- Clade: Eudicots
- Clade: Asterids
- Order: Gentianales
- Family: Apocynaceae
- Subfamily: Asclepiadoideae
- Tribe: Ceropegieae
- Genus: Huernia; R.Br.

Type species
- Huernia campanulata (Masson) R.Br. ex Haw.

= Huernia =

Genus of flowering plants

The genus Huernia (family Apocynaceae, subfamily Asclepiadoideae) consists of perennial, stem succulents from Eastern and Southern Africa and Arabia, first described as a genus in 1810.

The flowers are five-lobed, usually somewhat more funnel- or bell-shaped than in the closely related genus Stapelia, and often striped vividly in contrasting colors or tones, some glossy, others matte and wrinkled depending on the species concerned. Frequently the flowers are colored a variation of red, yellow or brown. To pollinate, the flowers attract flies by emitting a scent similar to that of carrion. The genus is considered close to the genera Stapelia and Hoodia. Phylogenetic studies have shown the genus to be monophyletic, and most closely related to the genus Tavaresia, and to a widespread branch of stapeliads comprising the genera Orbea, Piaranthus and Stapelia.

The name of the plant is in honor of Justus van Heurne (1587–1653?) a Dutch missionary, botanist, and doctor, who is reputed to have been the first European to document and collect South African Cape plants. His surname has variations (van Horne, Heurnius, van Heurnius), however it was misspelled by the plant collector.

Various species of Huernia are considered famine food by the inhabitants of Konso special woreda in southern Ethiopia. The local inhabitants, who call the native species of this genus baqibaqa indiscriminately, eat it with prepared balls of sorghum (kurkufa); they note that baqibaqa tastes relatively good and has no unpleasant side-effects when boiled and consumed. As a result, local farmers encouraged it to grow on stone walls forming the terraces, where it does not compete with other crops.

== Species ==
The following species of Huernia are found in Africa (East Africa, South Africa and Ethiopia) and Arabia (Saudi Arabia, Yemen).

- Huernia anagaynensis Plowes
- Huernia andreaeana (Rauh) L.C.Leach
- Huernia archeri L.C.Leach
- Huernia asirensis Plowes
- Huernia aspera N.E.Br.
- Huernia baradii Plowes
- Huernia barbata (Masson) Haw.
- Huernia blyderiverensis (L.C.Leach) Bruyns
- Huernia boleana M.G.Gilbert
- Huernia calosticta Bruyns
- Huernia collenetteae Plowes
- Huernia concinna N.E.Br.
- Huernia delicata Plowes
- Huernia × distincta N.E.Br.
- Huernia engleri A.Terracc.
- Huernia erectiloba L.C.Leach & Lavranos
- Huernia erinacea P.R.O.Bally
- Huernia foetida Plowes
- Huernia formosa L.C.Leach
- Huernia guttata (Masson) Haw.
- Huernia hadhramautica Lavranos
- Huernia hallii E.Lamb & B.M.Lamb
- Huernia hislopii Turrill
- Huernia humilis (Masson) Haw.
- Huernia humpatana Bruyns
- Huernia hystrix (Hook.f.) N.E.Br.
- Huernia keniensis R.E.Fr.
- Huernia kennedyana Lavranos
- Huernia khalidbinsultanii Plowes & T.A.McCoy
- Huernia kirkii N.E.Br.
- Huernia laevis J.R.I.Wood
- Huernia lavranii L.C.Leach
- Huernia leachii Lavranos
- Huernia lenewtonii Plowes
- Huernia levyi Oberm.
- Huernia lodarensis Lavranos
- Huernia loeseneriana Schltr.
- Huernia longii Pillans
- Huernia longituba N.E.Br.
- Huernia lopanthera Bruyns
- Huernia macrocarpa (A.Rich.) Schweinf. ex K.Schum.
- Huernia marnieriana Lavranos
- Huernia mccoyi Plowes
- Huernia namaquensis Pillans
- Huernia nigeriana Lavranos
- Huernia nouhuysii I.Verd.
- Huernia occulta L.C.Leach & Plowes
- Huernia oculata Hook.f.
- Huernia pendula E.A.Bruce
- Huernia piersii N.E.Br.
- Huernia pillansii N.E.Br.
- Huernia plowesii L.C.Leach
- Huernia praestans N.E.Br.
- Huernia procumbens (R.A.Dyer) L.C.Leach
- Huernia pulchra Orlando & El Azzouni
- Huernia quinta (E.Phillips) A.C.White & B.Sloane
- Huernia radhwana Plowes
- Huernia recondita M.G.Gilbert
- Huernia reticulata (Masson) Haw.
- Huernia rosea L.E.Newton & Lavranos
- Huernia rubra Plowes
- Huernia rubrosticta Plowes
- Huernia saudi-arabica D.V.Field
- Huernia schneideriana A.Berger
- Huernia similis N.E.Br.
- Huernia somalica N.E.Br.
- Huernia stapelioides Schltr.
- Huernia sudanensis Plowes
- Huernia tanganyikensis (E.A.Bruce & P.R.O.Bally) L.C.Leach
- Huernia thuretii J.F.Cels
- Huernia transvaalensis Stent
- Huernia urceolata L.C.Leach
- Huernia verekeri Stent
- Huernia volkartii Werderm. & Peitscher
- Huernia whitesloaneana Nel
- Huernia witzenbergensis C.A.Lückh.
- Huernia yemenensis Plowes
- Huernia zebrina N.E.Br.

formerly included

moved to Angolluma

- Huernia sprengeri now Angolluma sprengeri

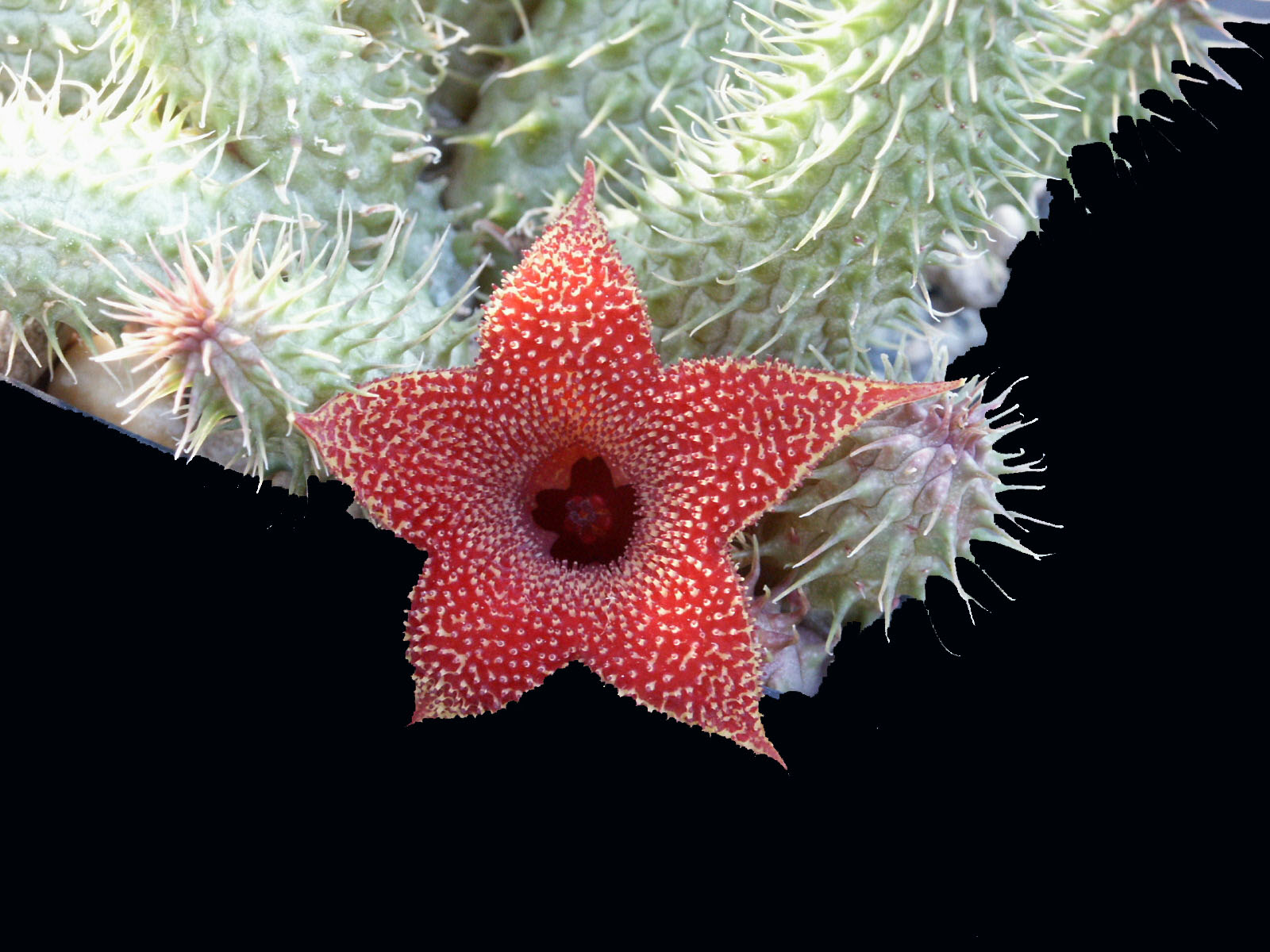
Huernia asperia

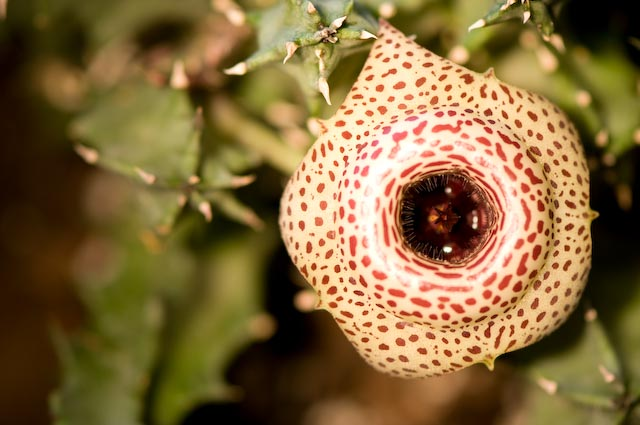
Huernia guttata

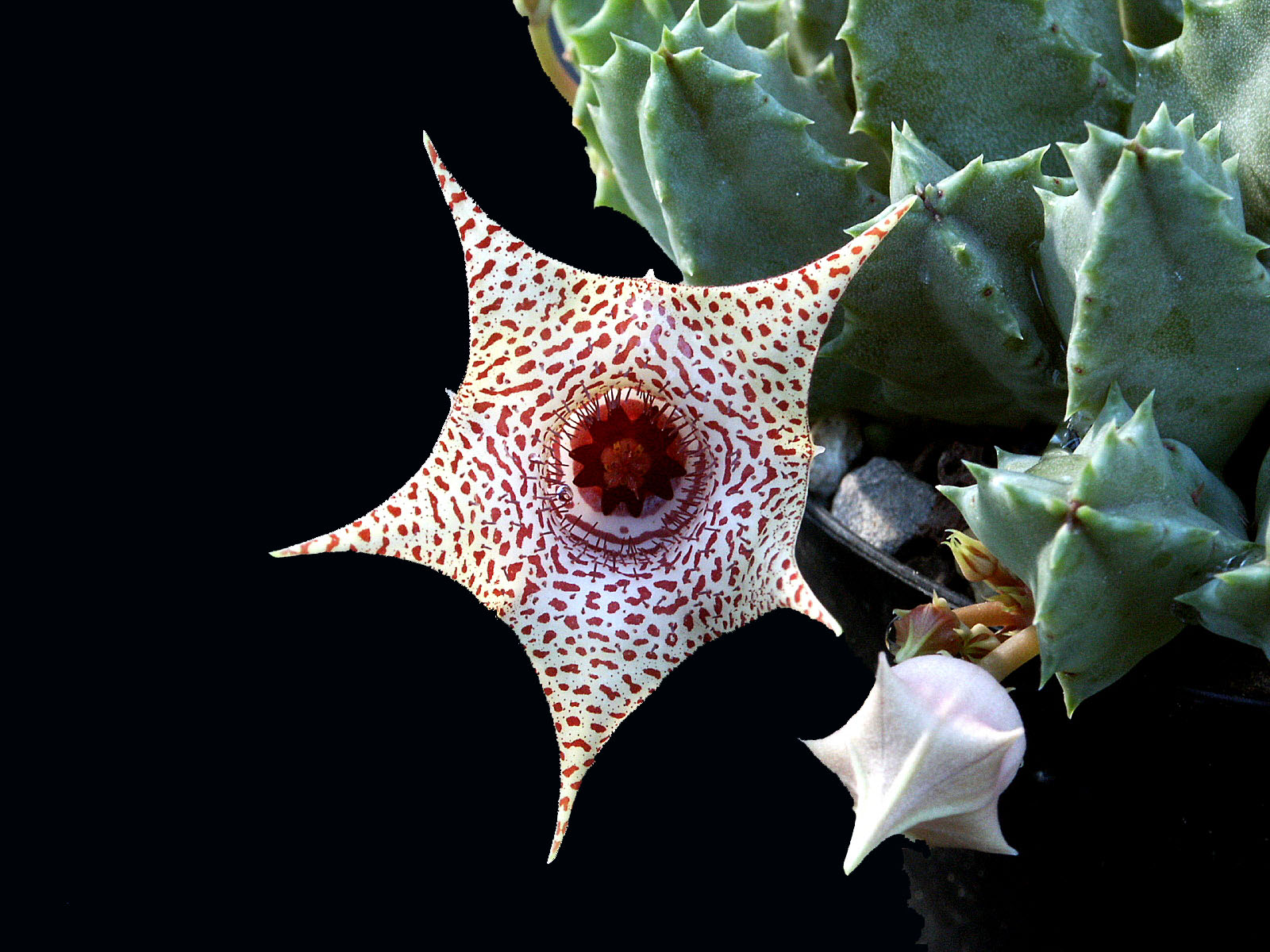
Huernia piersii

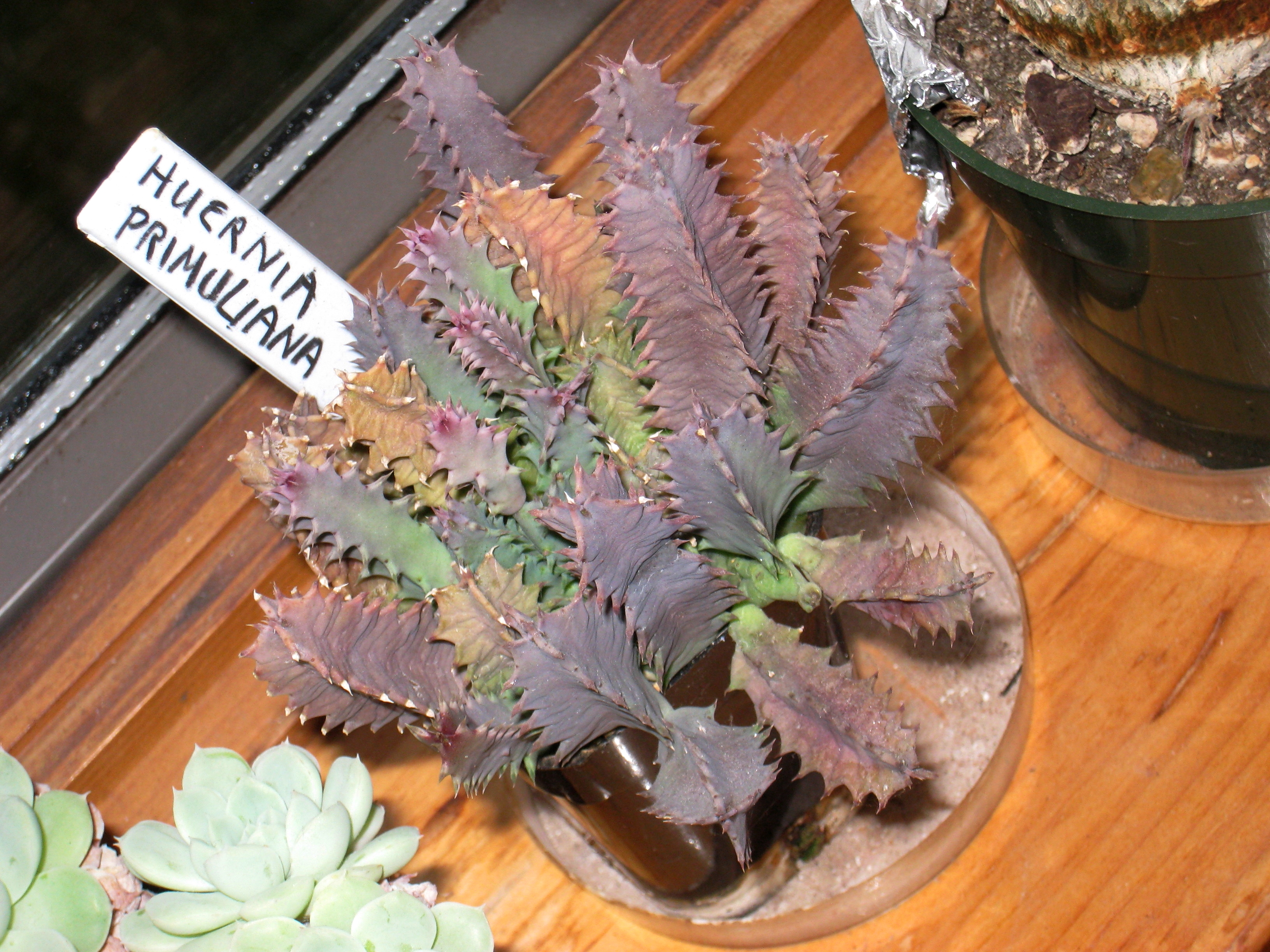
Huernia primulina

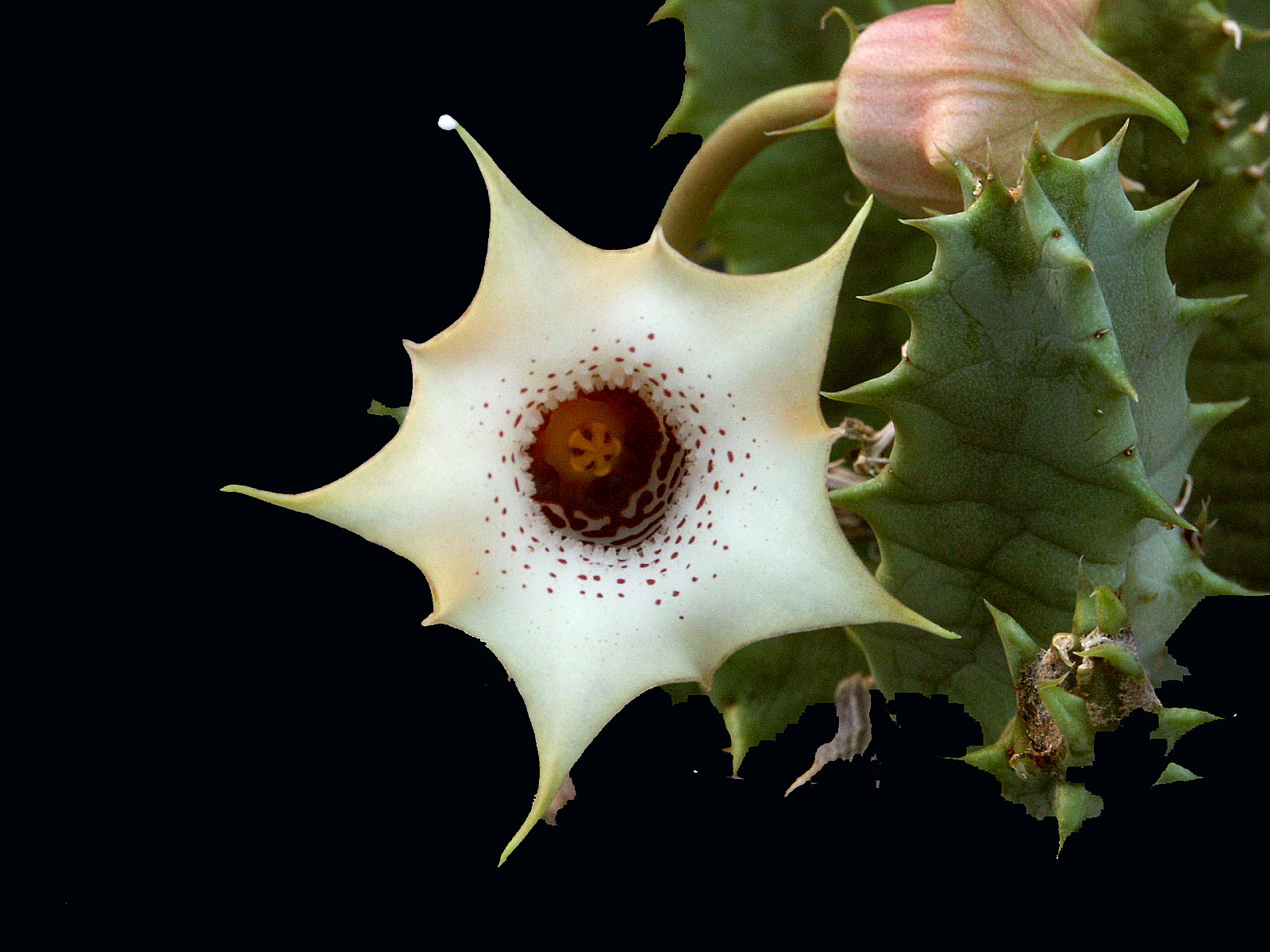
Huernia quinta

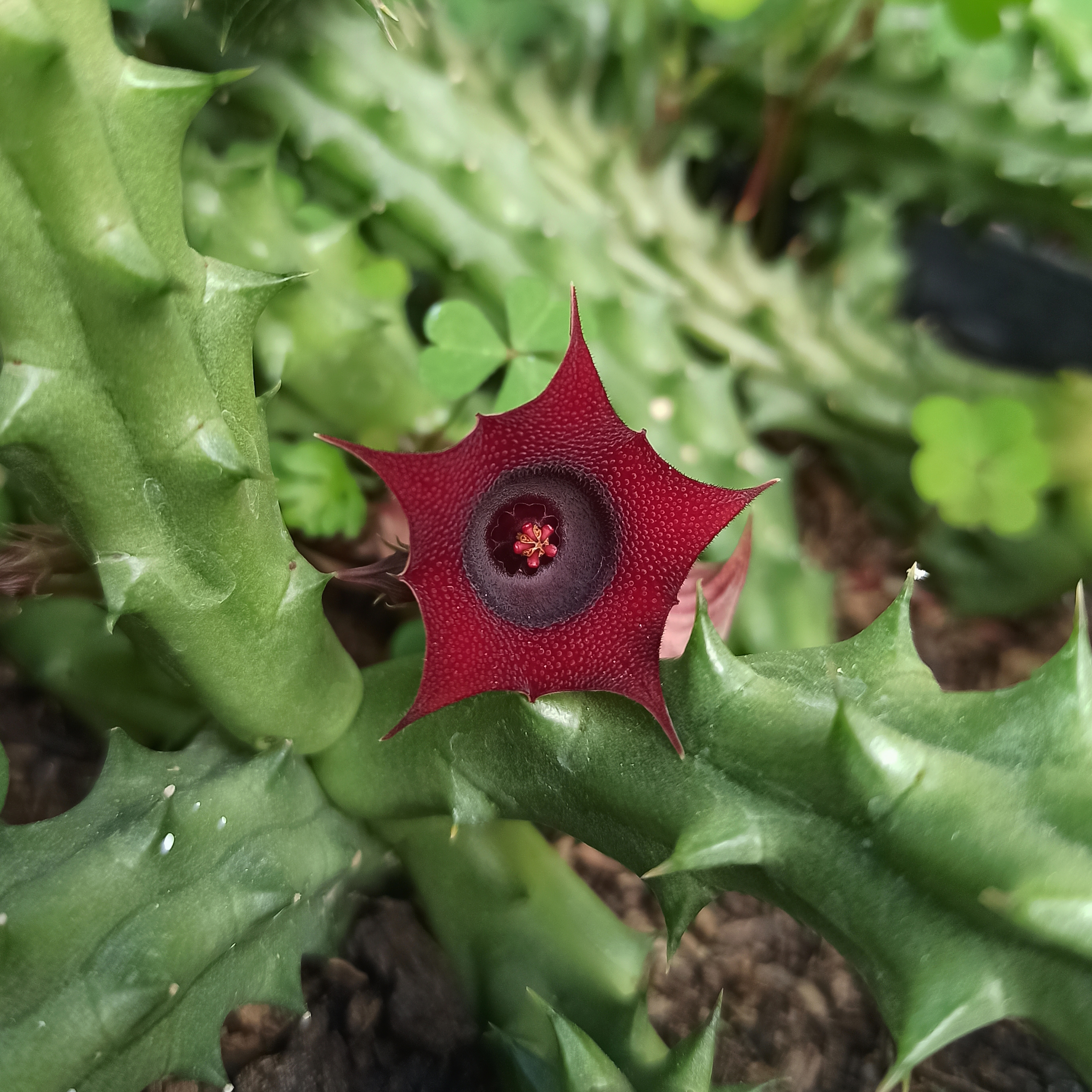
Huernia schneideriana

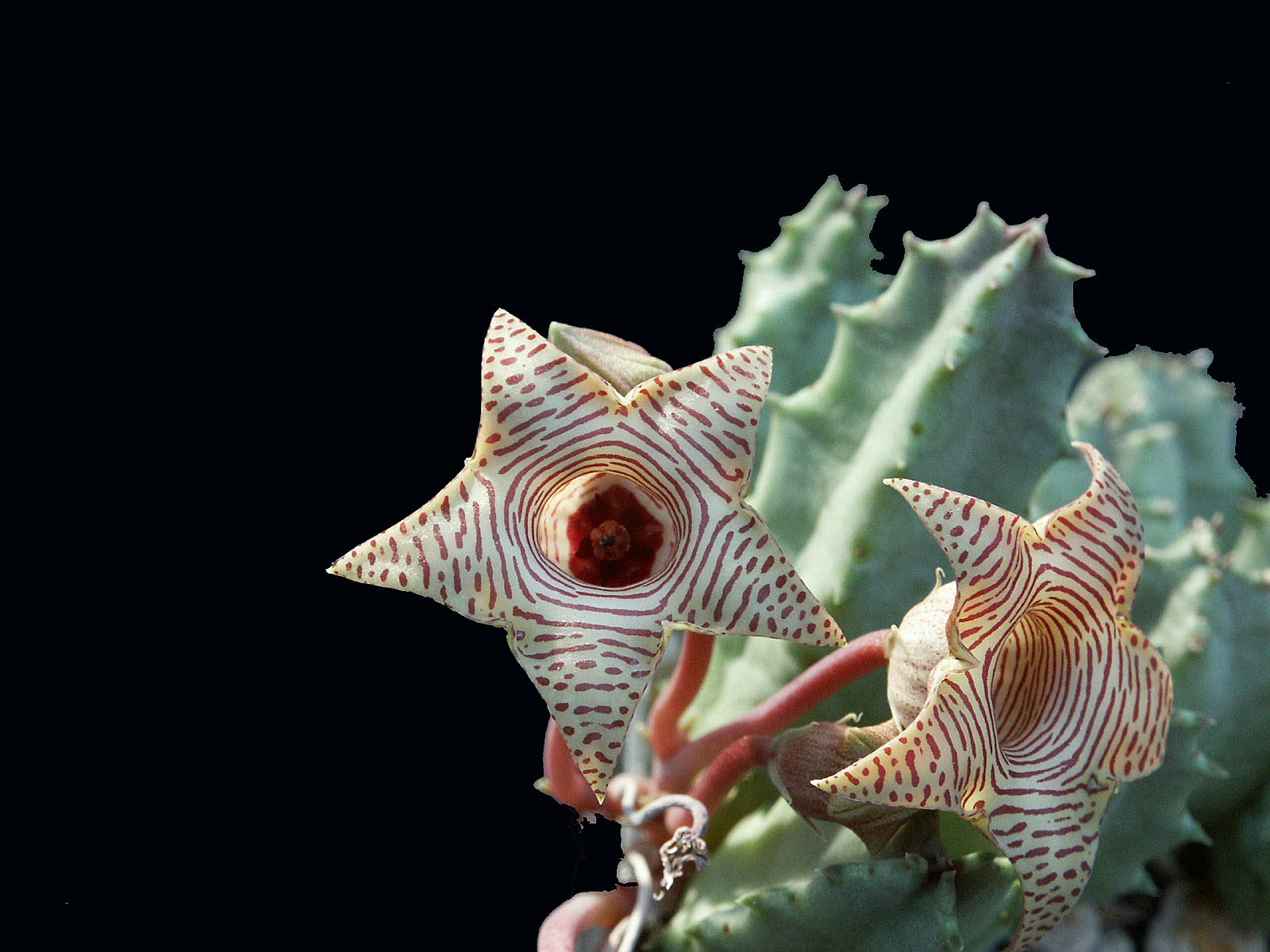
Huernia striata

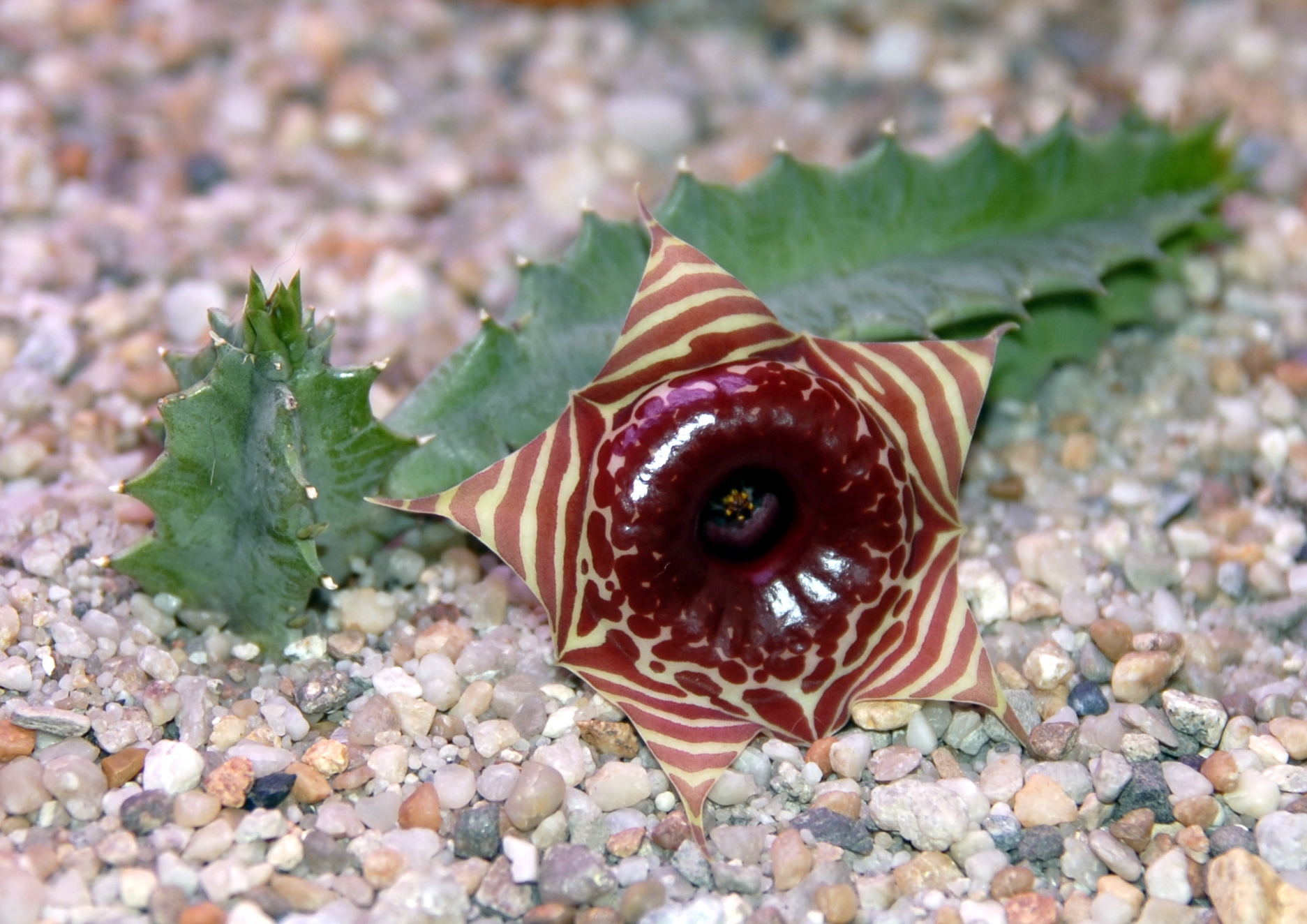
Huernia zebrina
