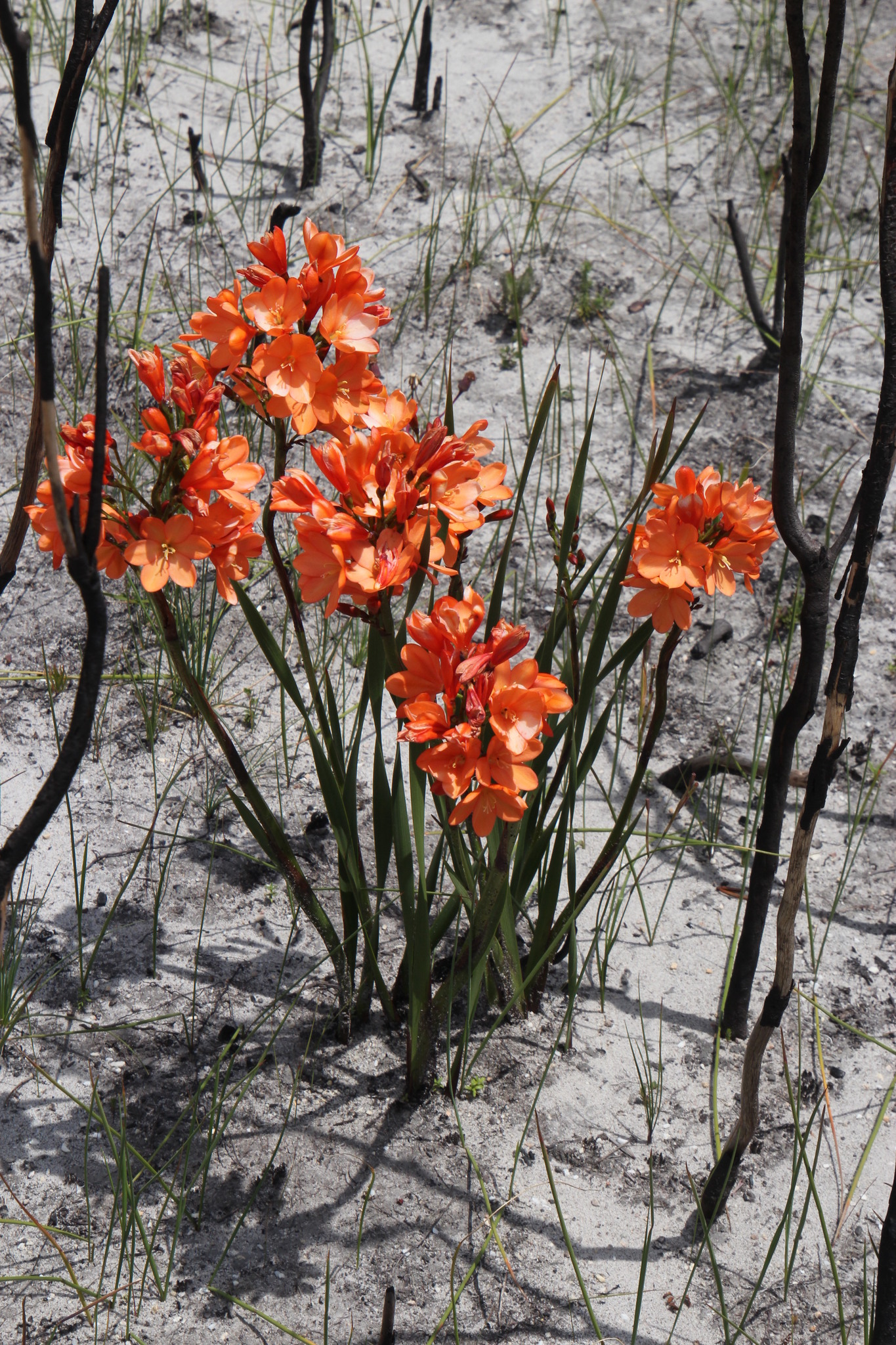

Scientific classification
- Kingdom: Plantae
- Clade: Tracheophytes
- Clade: Angiosperms
- Clade: Monocots
- Order: Asparagales
- Family: Iridaceae
- Subfamily: Crocoideae
- Tribe: Watsonieae
- Genus: Pillansia; L.Bolus
- Species: P. templemannii

Binomial name
- Pillansia templemannii (Baker) L.Bolus

Synonyms
- Tritonia templemannii Baker; Aristea wredowia Steud. name published without description; Wredowia pulchra Eckl. name published without description

= Pillansia =

Species of plant

Pillansia is a genus of flowering plants in the family Iridaceae, first described as a genus in 1914. It contains only one known species, Pillansia templemannii, which is endemic to the Western Cape province in South Africa. It is an evergreen, perennial plant that has an underground corm, about five fibrous, strap-like leaves, and a panicle-like inflorescence, consisting of highly distinctive, star-symmetrical, cup-shaped orange flowers of approximately 5 cm (2.0 in) across, each with a floral tube of about 6 mm (0.24 in) long and 6 rounded slightly cup-shaped tepals. It flowers in October and November, but only after a fire burned down the surrounding woody vegetation. It is called fireflag or pillansia in English.

== Taxonomy ==
The fireflag was first named in 1827 by Danish apothecary Christian Friedrich Ecklon who called it Wredowia pulchra. Ecklon who is especially known for being an avid collector and researcher of plants in South Africa, however failed to include a description, which makes this name invalid. The German medical docter Ernst Gottlieb von Steudel moved Ecklon's species and gave it the name Aristea wredowia, but also without providing a description. In 1892, British botanist John Gilbert Baker was the first to scientifically describe the fireflag and he called it Tritonia templemannii. South African botanist Harriet Margaret Louisa Bolus was of the opinion that the species was sufficiently different from other members of the iris family that she moved it to a newly erected genus and created in 1914 the combination Pillansia templemannii. The species is assigned to the family Iridaceae, subfamily Crocoidae, tribe Watsonieae.

The genus name is a tribute to the South African botanist Neville Stuart Pillans, who brought the species to the attention of Harriet Margaret Louisa Bolus. The species was named by Baker after nurseryman and plant collector Robert Templeman from Cape Town, who in 1887 collected the type specimen.

== Description ==
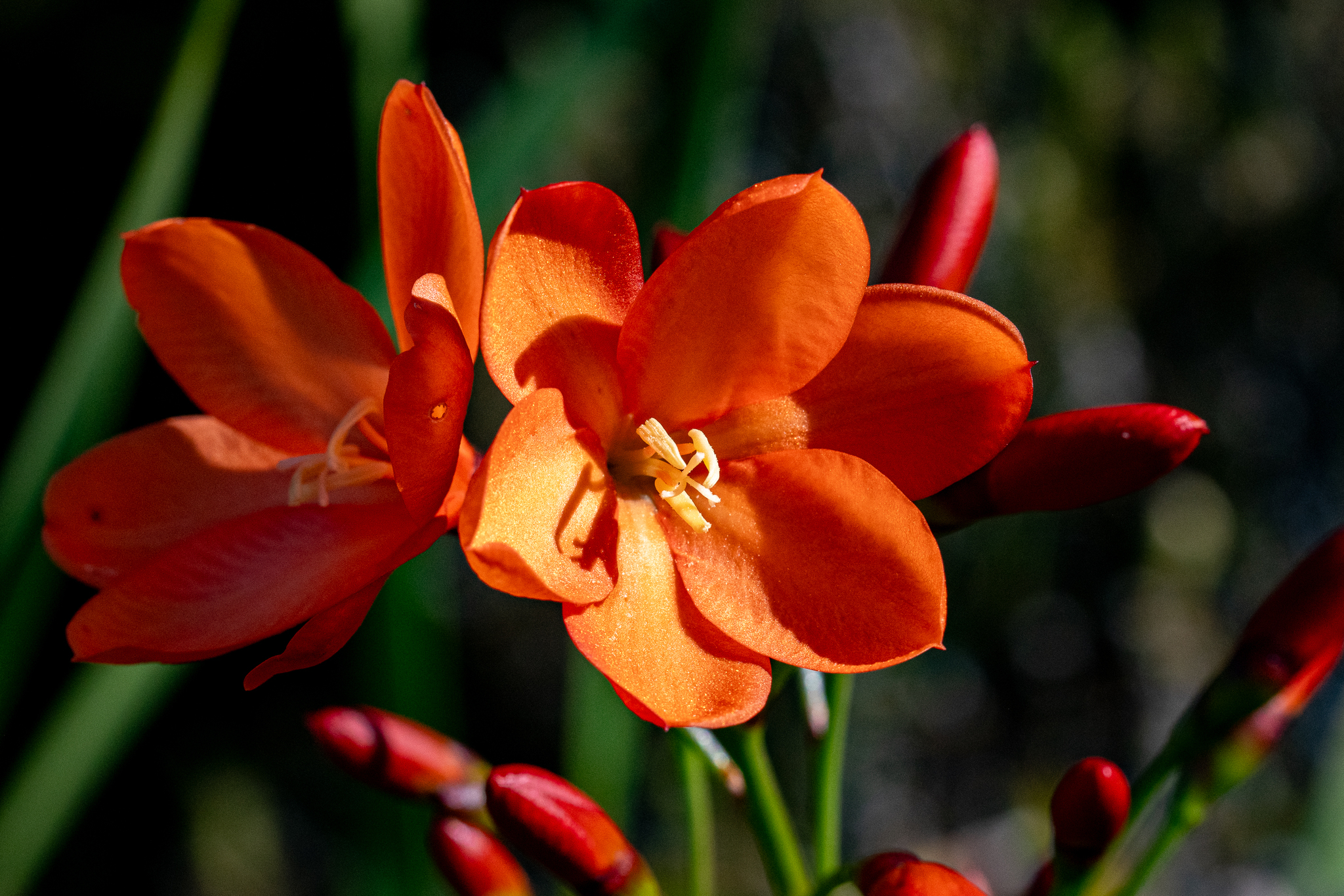
flower showing six tepals, three stamens and three style branches.

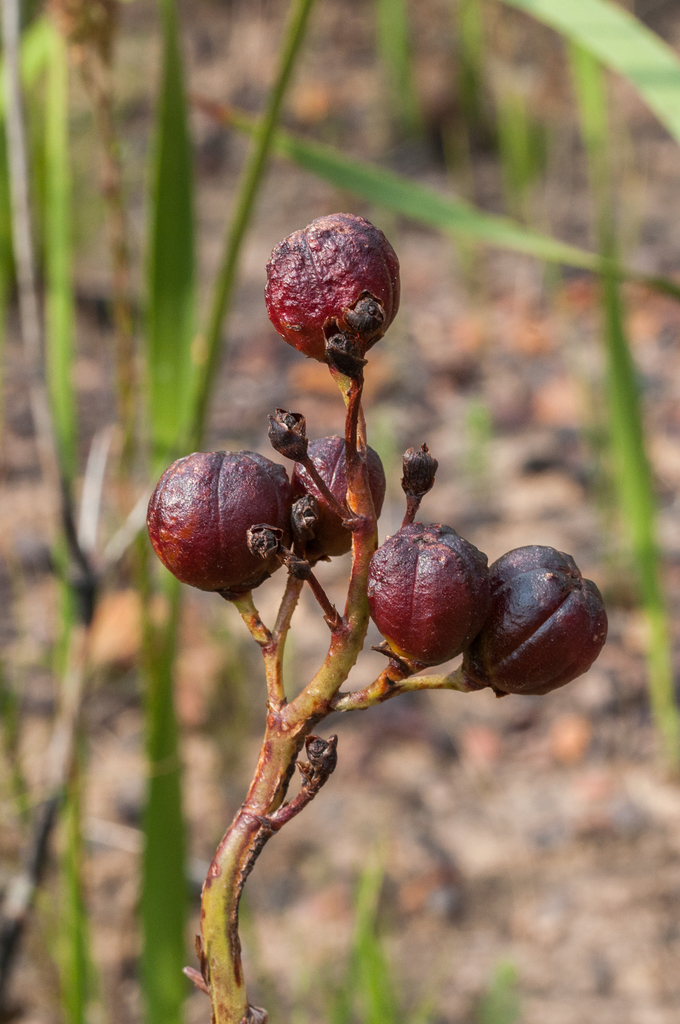
the woody seed capsules

The fireflag is an evergreen geofyte of mostly 60–80 cm (24–31 in) high, that emerges from a spherical corm of 1½-2½ cm (0.6-1.0 in) across, that is flattened at the top and bottom, and is envelopped in a coarsely fibrous tunic, while the corms of previous years are still present. At the base of the stem are two or three leathery and brownish sheath-like leaves (or cataphyls). The stout, erect, repeatedly branching stem is angled to narrowly winged below. The branches ascend and are smooth or sparsely warty. The bracts subtending the branches are small, oval to lance-shaped, brown-papery, and dry when flowering. The four or five leaves are twisted, line- to strap-shaped, leathery and hard, 4½-12 cm (1¾-5 in) long and 0.6-1.0 cm (¼-⅖ in) wide, more or less upright to lying on the ground, with many parallel veins, but the main vein in the middle obscured, with a pointy tip. The lowest leaf is the longest, higher ones are successively shorter and set along the stem, the highest two or three only consisting of a leaf sheath, are reddish brown and dry when flowering. The inflorescence usually has many ascending, smooth or warty branches, each of which carrying a single flower. The leathery bract in the inflorescence are (broadly) oval, 5–8 mm (0.20–0.31 in) long, with a pointy tip, entirely dark brown or green below, with a papery edge. The firm-textured, cup-shaped, bright orange flowers are more or less upright or somewhat nodding. The funnel-shaped perianth-tube is 5–7 mm (0.20–0.28 in) long and splits up in six, saucer-shaped, obovate tepals with the middle vein extending into an exerted tip, that are more or less upright below but quickly spread out, the outer slightly narrower or as wide as the inner, 20–30 mm (0.79–1.18 in) long and mostly 7–15 mm (0.28–0.59 in) wide. The three erect or outward curving stamens are inserted just below the mouth of the perianth tube. Each consists of a filament of 8–10 mm (0.31–0.39 in) long at base and a yellow anther of 7–8 mm (0.28–0.31 in) on top. The pollen The pollen grain has a single elongated furrow or groove (a "sulcus") which acts as a germination pore. It also has a distinct, thickened lid (the "operculum") covering this opening. This opening has two bands. The outer protective layer of the pollen is covered in microscopic holes and tiny, rough bumps. The line-shaped style divides into three branches of 5–8 mm (0.20–0.31 in) long at the same height as the anthers, and each branche forks at the tip or for upto ⅓ of its length. The ovary is covered in mucus and will later develop into a woody capsule of 12–20 mm (0.47–0.79 in) long and 10–12 mm (0.39–0.47 in) wide, that opens with three valves, each releasing one to three seeds. The reddish brown seeds are approximately 8 mm long, angled, finely netted and shiny.

== Distribution, ecology and conservation ==
The fireflag is an endemic of the coastal mountains in the southwest of the Western Cape province, ranging from the Kogelberg to the Kleinrivier Mountains, where it prefers the cooler sandstone slopes facing south at altitudes between 300–700 m (980–2,300 ft) but it also occurring at lower elevations near the coast. The flowers are visited by bee species and monkey beetles. The plants can suffer from red spider mites and several insects including aphids, mealybugs, snout beetles and lily borers, and are also eaten by slugs, molerats and cape porcupines. It has a stable population and is considered not to be threatened. The Red List of South African Plants assessed the species as Least Concern (LC).
