= Huernia hallii =

Conservation status
- Least Concern (IUCN 3.1)

Scientific classification
- Kingdom: Plantae
- Clade: Tracheophytes
- Clade: Angiosperms
- Clade: Eudicots
- Clade: Asterids
- Order: Gentianales
- Family: Apocynaceae
- Genus: Huernia
- Species: H. hallii

Binomial name
- Huernia hallii E.Lamb & B.M.Lamb

Species of plant

Huernia hallii is a species of plant in the family Apocynaceae. It is endemic to Namibia. Its natural habitat is rocky areas.
