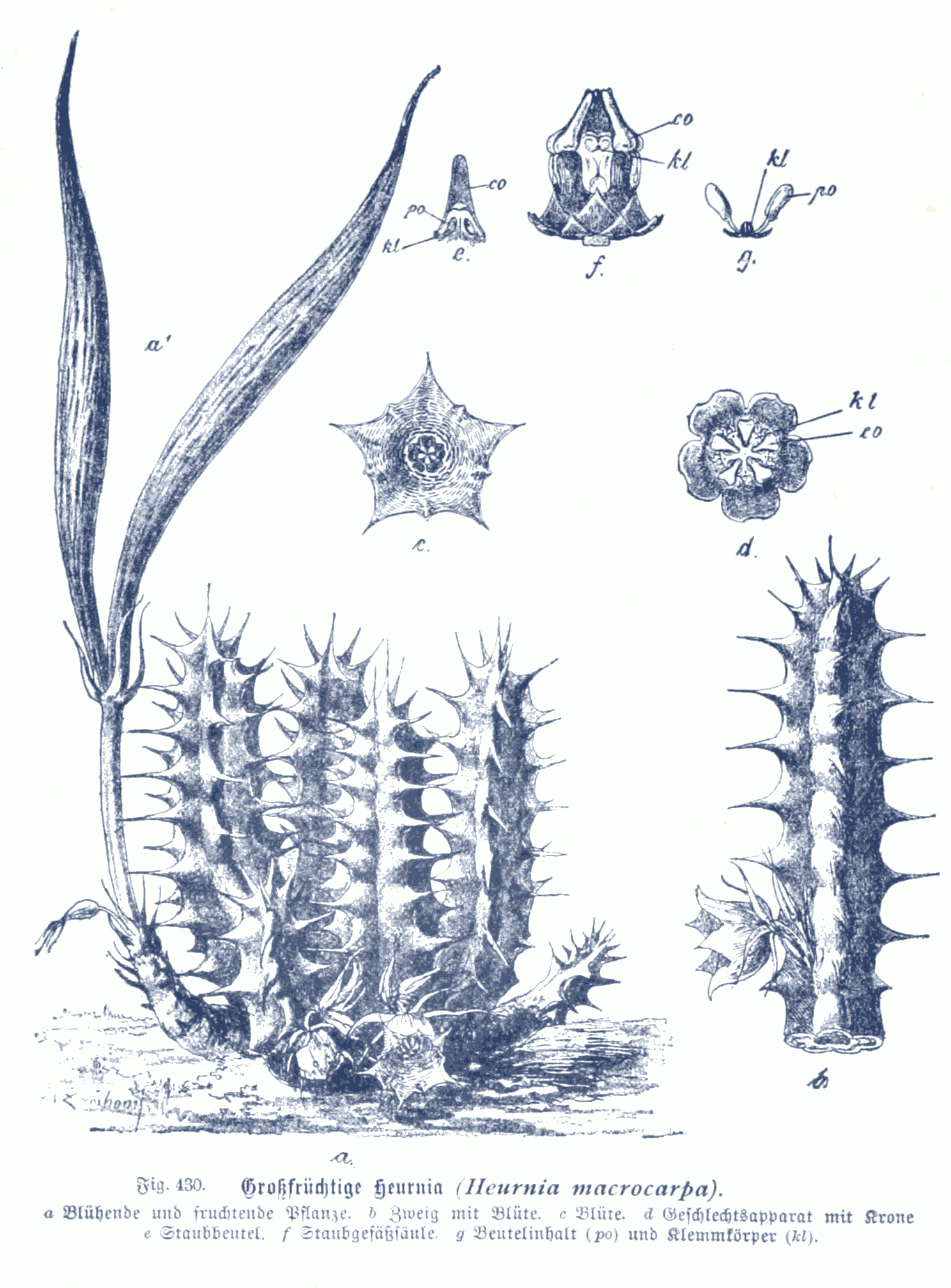

Scientific classification
- Kingdom: Plantae
- Clade: Tracheophytes
- Clade: Angiosperms
- Clade: Eudicots
- Clade: Asterids
- Order: Gentianales
- Family: Apocynaceae
- Genus: Huernia
- Species: H. macrocarpa

Binomial name
- Huernia macrocarpa (A.Rich.) Schweinf. ex K.Schum.

= Huernia macrocarpa =

Species of plant

Huernia macrocarpa is a colorful succulent plant related to the milkweeds. This beautiful plant grows to a height of five or six meters, extending fleshy, toothed arms, dark pink star-shaped flowers and small eyes. It is commonly kept as a potted houseplant.
