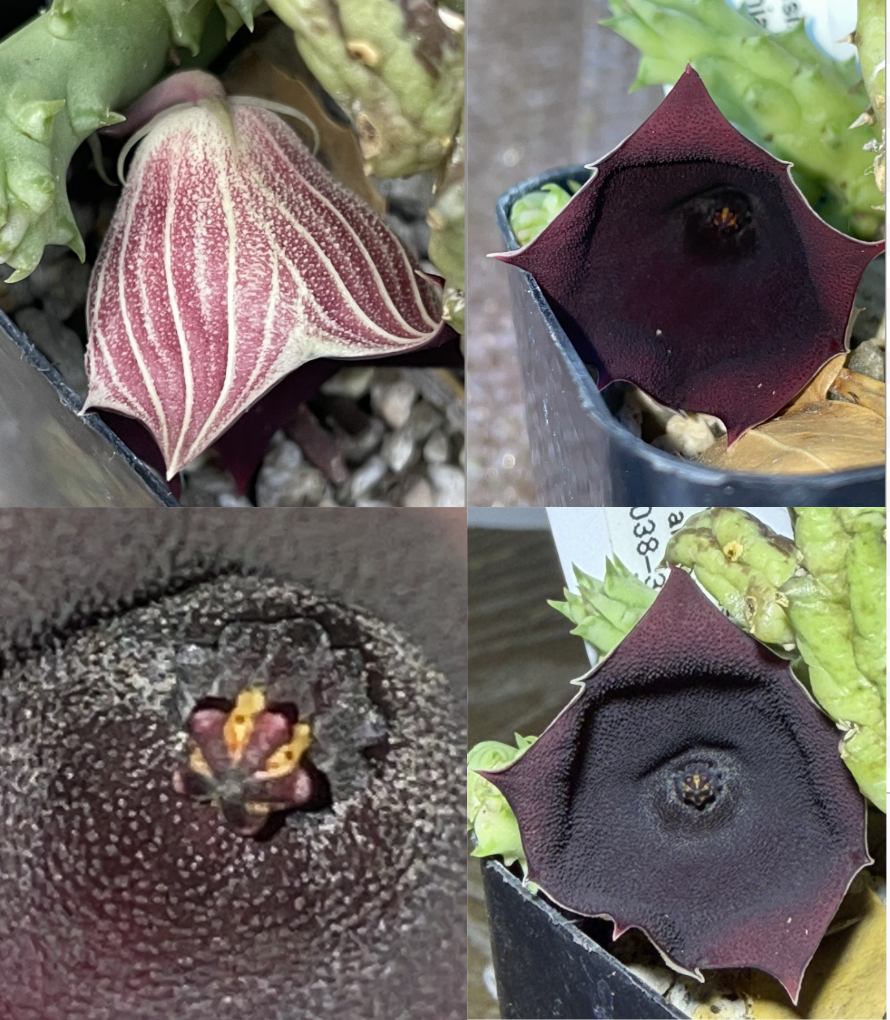

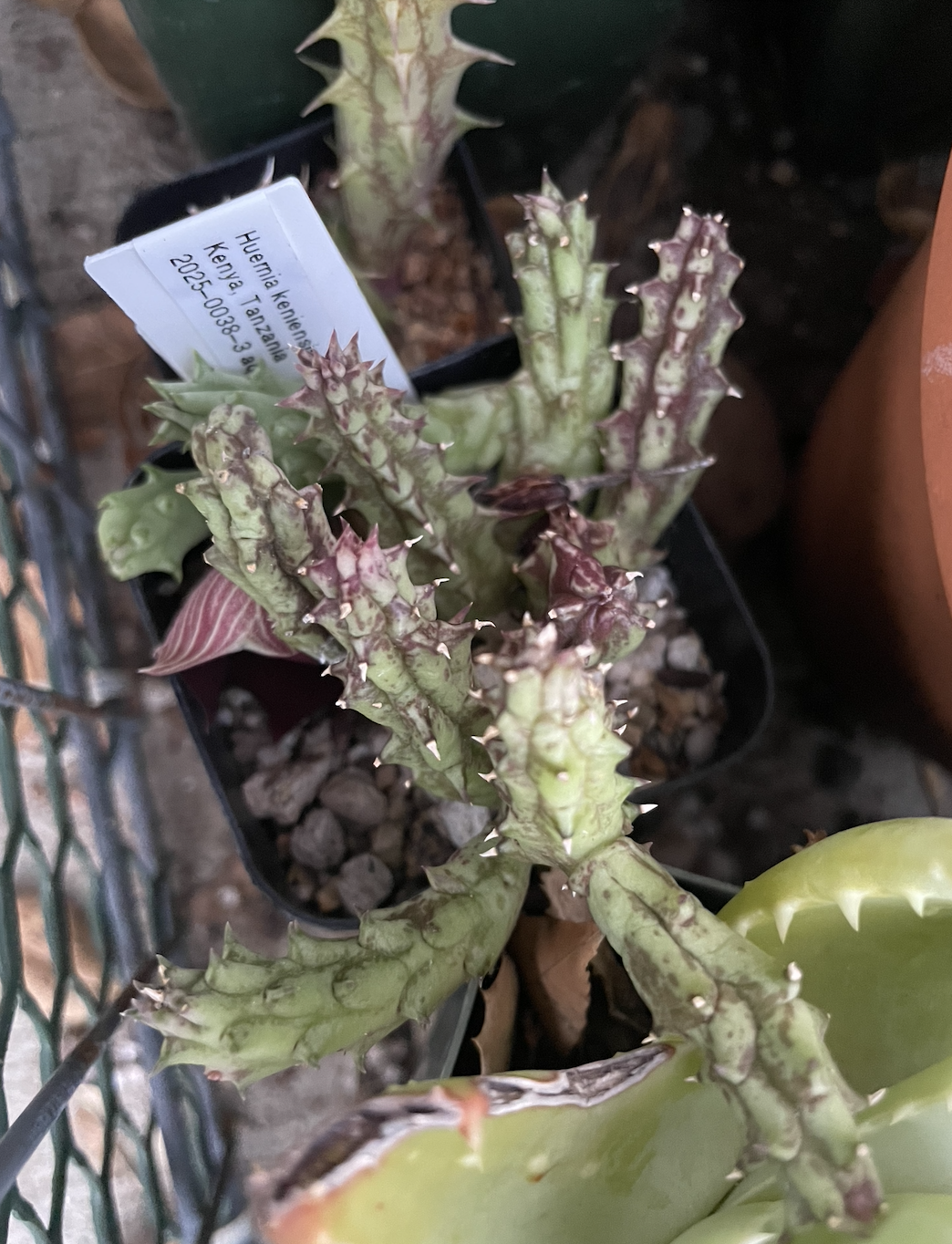

Scientific classification
- Kingdom: Plantae
- Clade: Embryophytes
- Clade: Tracheophytes
- Clade: Angiosperms
- Clade: Eudicots
- Clade: Asterids
- Order: Gentianales
- Family: Apocynaceae
- Genus: Huernia
- Species: H. keniensis

Binomial name
- Huernia keniensis R.E.Fr.

= Huernia keniensis =

Species

Huernia keniensis is a species of Huernia native to Kenya and Tanzania.

== Plants ==
Plants look like most stapeliads, stems with green bodies and knobs. The plants form clumps.

== Flowers ==
The flowers are a dark red color that appears black. The corolla is 10 pointed, and the flowers are a distinct star shape.
