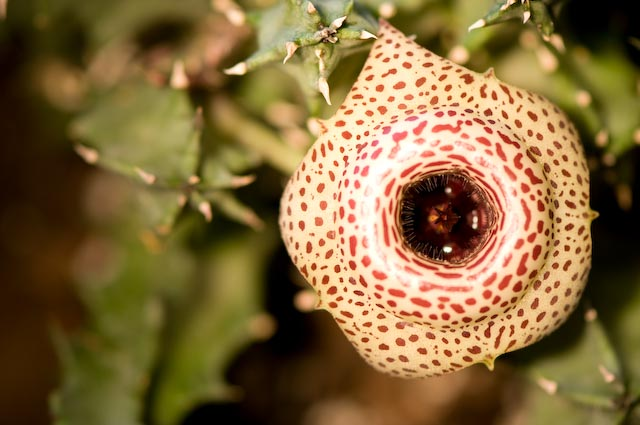
- Flower
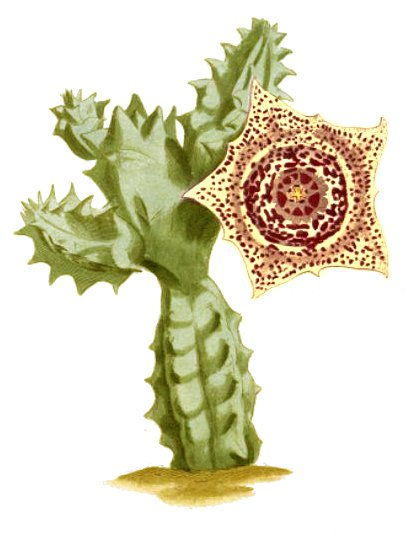
- Botanical illustration

Scientific classification
- Kingdom: Plantae
- Clade: Embryophytes
- Clade: Tracheophytes
- Clade: Spermatophytes
- Clade: Angiosperms
- Clade: Eudicots
- Clade: Asterids
- Order: Gentianales
- Family: Apocynaceae
- Genus: Huernia
- Species: H. guttata

Binomial name
- Huernia guttata (Masson) Haw.

Synonyms
- List: Ceropegia guttata (Masson) Bruyns; Huernia guttata subsp. calitzdorpensis L.C.Leach; Huernia lentiginosa (Sims) Haw.; Huernia occellata (Jacq.) Schult.; Huernia venusta (Masson) Haw.; Stapelia guttata Masson; Stapelia lentiginosa Sims; Stapelia ocellata Jacq.; Stapelia venusta Masson

= Huernia guttata =

Species of flowering plant

Huernia guttata is a species of flowering plant in the family Apocynaceae, native to the southern Cape Provinces of South Africa. A succulent, it has gained the Royal Horticultural Society's Award of Garden Merit.
