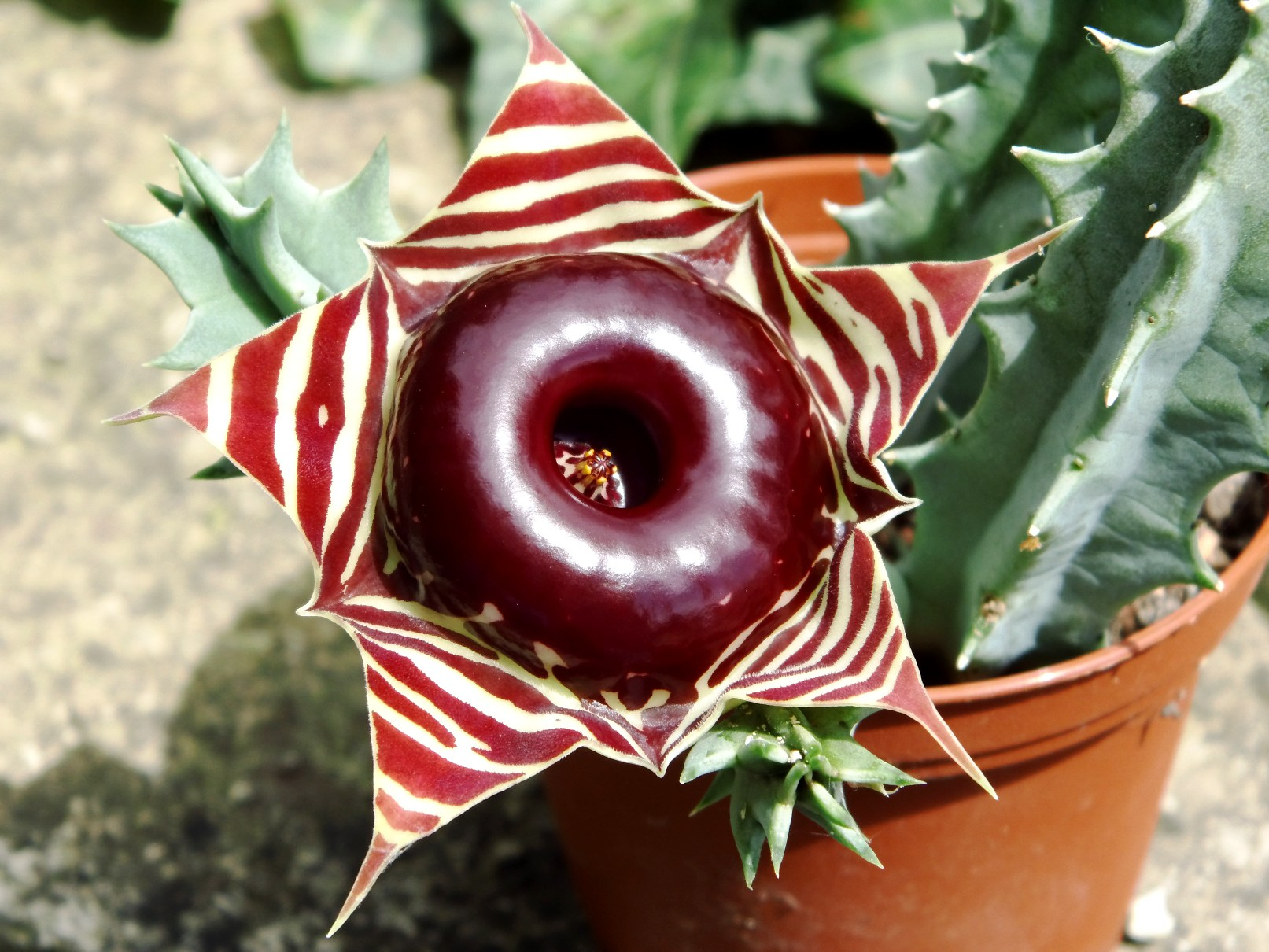
- The flower emits a carrion odor to attract flies

Scientific classification
- Kingdom: Plantae
- Clade: Embryophytes
- Clade: Tracheophytes
- Clade: Spermatophytes
- Clade: Angiosperms
- Clade: Eudicots
- Clade: Asterids
- Order: Gentianales
- Family: Apocynaceae
- Genus: Huernia
- Species: H. zebrina

Binomial name
- Huernia zebrina N.E.Br.

Synonyms
- List: Ceropegia zebrina (N.E.Br.) Bruyns; Ceropegia zebrina subsp. insigniflora (C.A.Maass) Bruyns; Huernia blackbeardiae R.A.Dyer ex H.Jacobsen; Huernia confusa E.Phillips; Huernia insigniflora C.A.Maass; Huernia zebrina subsp. magniflora (E.Phillips) L.C.Leach; Huernia zebrina var. magniflora E.Phillips

= Huernia zebrina =

Species of plant

Huernia zebrina, the little owl or lifesaver cactus, is a species of flowering plant in the family Apocynaceae, native to Namibia, Botswana, northern South Africa, Zimbabwe, and Mozambique. It is a succulent, and has gained the Royal Horticultural Society's Award of Garden Merit.

== Subtaxa ==
The following subspecies are accepted:

- Huernia zebrina subsp. insigniflora (C.A.Maass) Bruyns
- Huernia zebrina subsp. zebrina
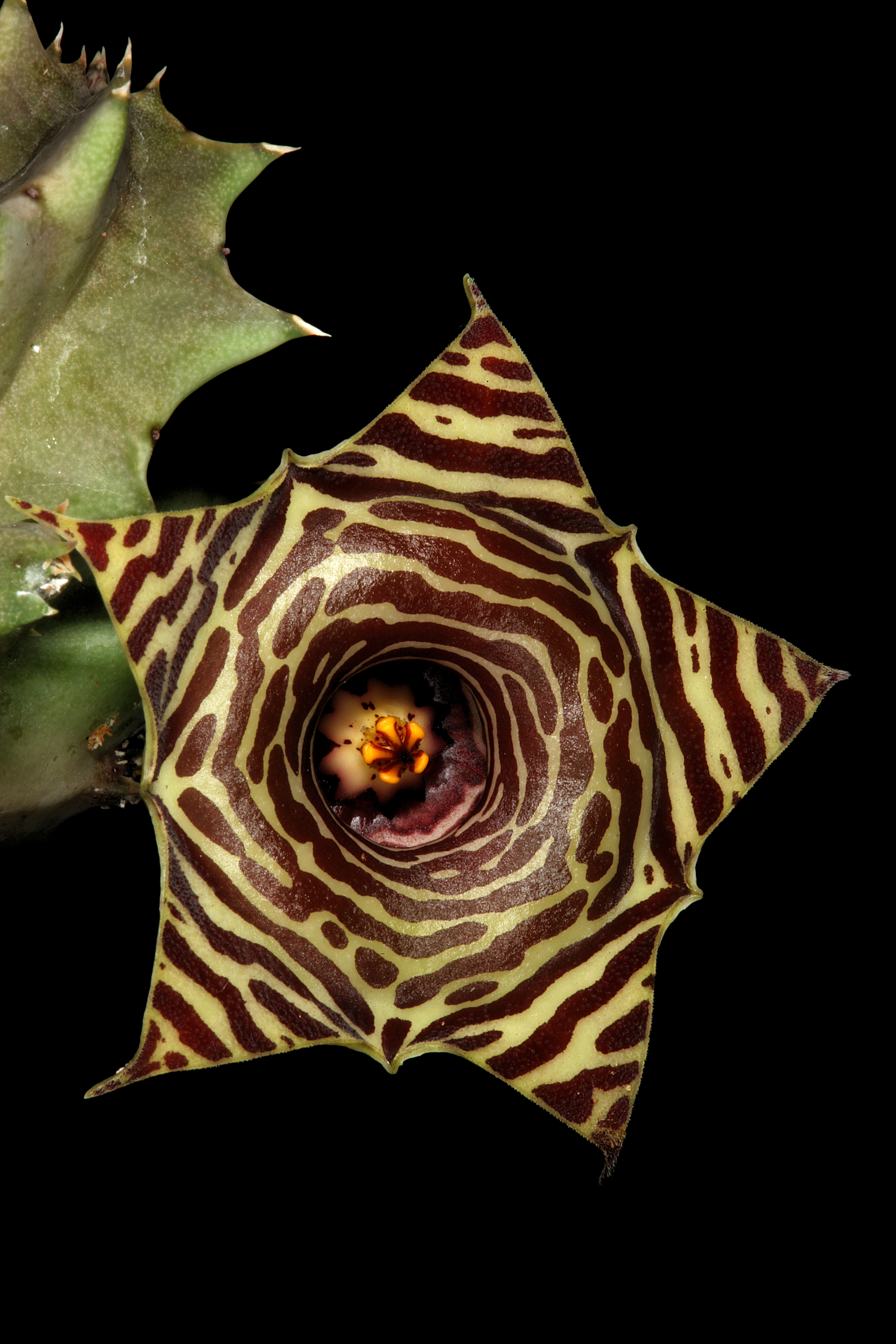
Huernia zebrina subsp. zebrina
