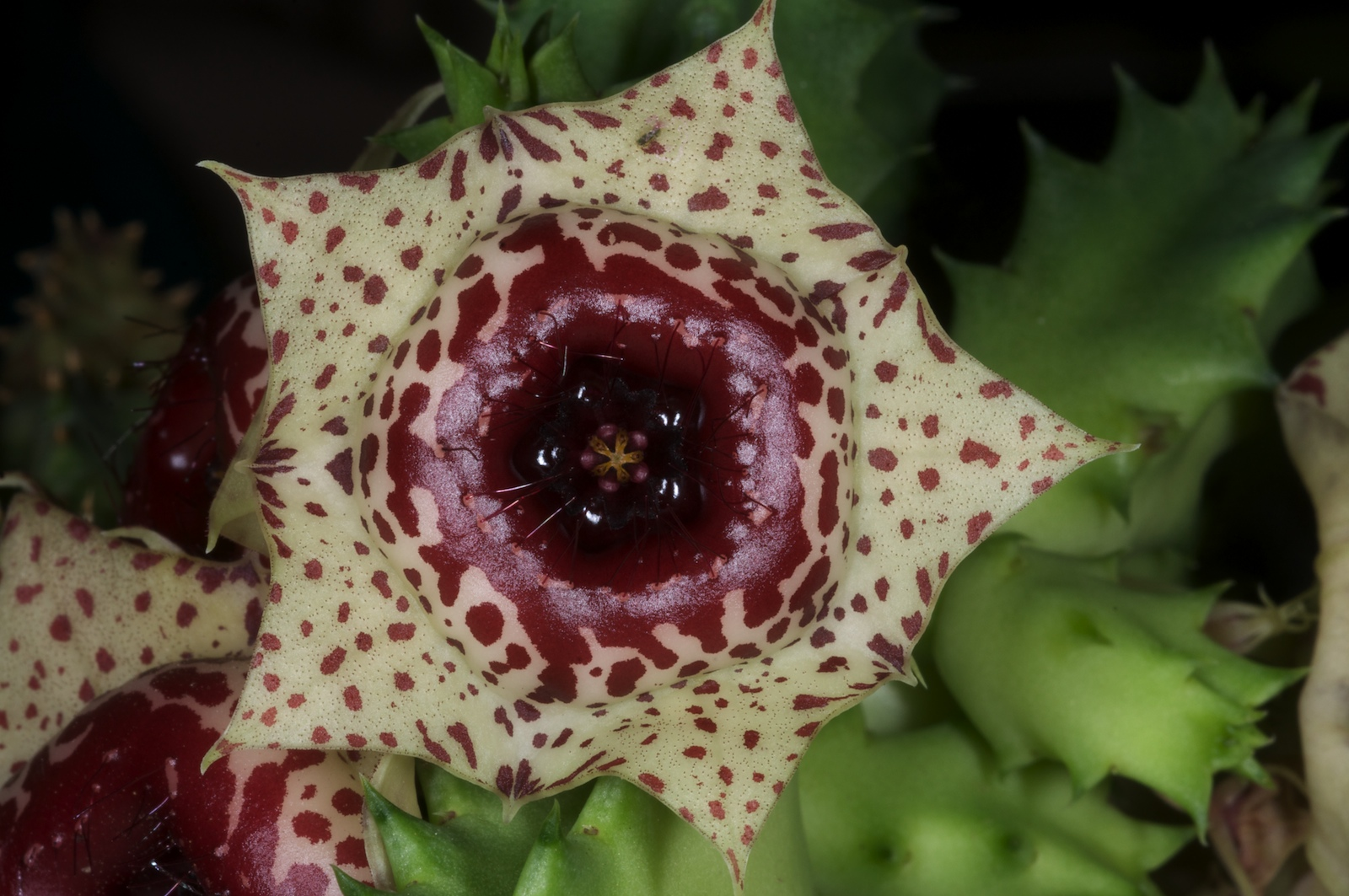

Conservation status
- Least Concern (IUCN 3.1)

Scientific classification
- Kingdom: Plantae
- Clade: Tracheophytes
- Clade: Angiosperms
- Clade: Eudicots
- Clade: Asterids
- Order: Gentianales
- Family: Apocynaceae
- Genus: Huernia
- Species: H. plowesii

Binomial name
- Huernia plowesii L.C.Leach

= Huernia plowesii =

Species of plant

Huernia plowesii is a species of plant in the family Apocynaceae. It is endemic to Namibia. Its natural habitat is rocky areas.
