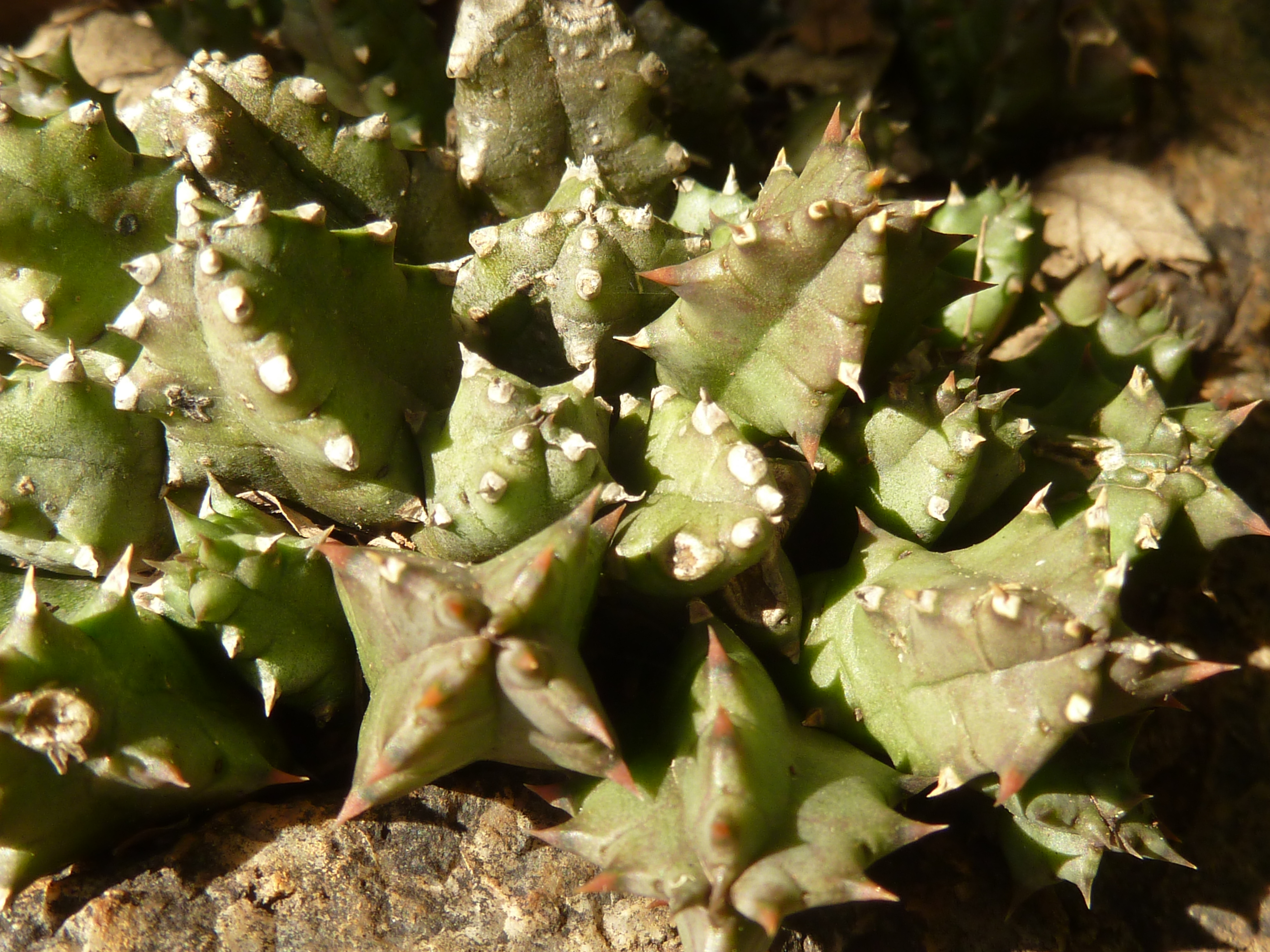
- Growth form

Scientific classification
- Kingdom: Plantae
- Clade: Embryophytes
- Clade: Tracheophytes
- Clade: Spermatophytes
- Clade: Angiosperms
- Clade: Eudicots
- Clade: Asterids
- Order: Gentianales
- Family: Apocynaceae
- Genus: Huernia
- Species: H. hystrix

Binomial name
- Huernia hystrix (Hook.f.) N.E.Br.

Synonyms
- List: Ceropegia hystrix (Hook.f.) Bruyns; Ceropegia hystrix subsp. parvula (L.C.Leach) Bruyns; Huernia appendiculata A.Berger; Huernia hystrix var. parvula L.C.Leach; Stapelia hystrix Hook.f.

= Huernia hystrix =

Species of flowering plant

Huernia hystrix, the porcupine huernia, is a species of flowering plant in the family Apocynaceae, native to southeastern Africa. A succulent, it has gained the Royal Horticultural Society's Award of Garden Merit.

== Distribution ==
H. hystrix is extensively sold in Zulu markets throughout South Africa for its supposed medicinal and protective magical properties, and in Eswatini as an alleged aphrodisiac.

Extracts from its stem and leaves may contain chemicals with anti-inflammatory properties, It has been proposed as a treatment for people suffering from HIV/AIDS.

== Habitation ==
It is highly drought-tolerant and grows well in pots, and so is a good species for ornamental xeriscaping.

== Threat ==
Destructive whole-plant harvesting has led to concerns about its survival.

== Propagation ==
Researchers at University of KwaZulu-Natal Botanical Garden have discovered multiple shoots can be propagated from a single explant by treatment with Murashige and Skoog medium + 1-Naphthaleneacetic acid + 6-Benzylaminopurine with 95% survival rates.

== Subtaxa ==
The following subspecies are accepted:

- Huernia hystrix subsp. hystrix – KwaZulu-Natal, Northern Provinces, Swaziland, Mozambique, Zimbabwe
- Huernia hystrix subsp. parvula (L.C.Leach) Bruyns – KwaZulu-Natal, Cape Provinces
