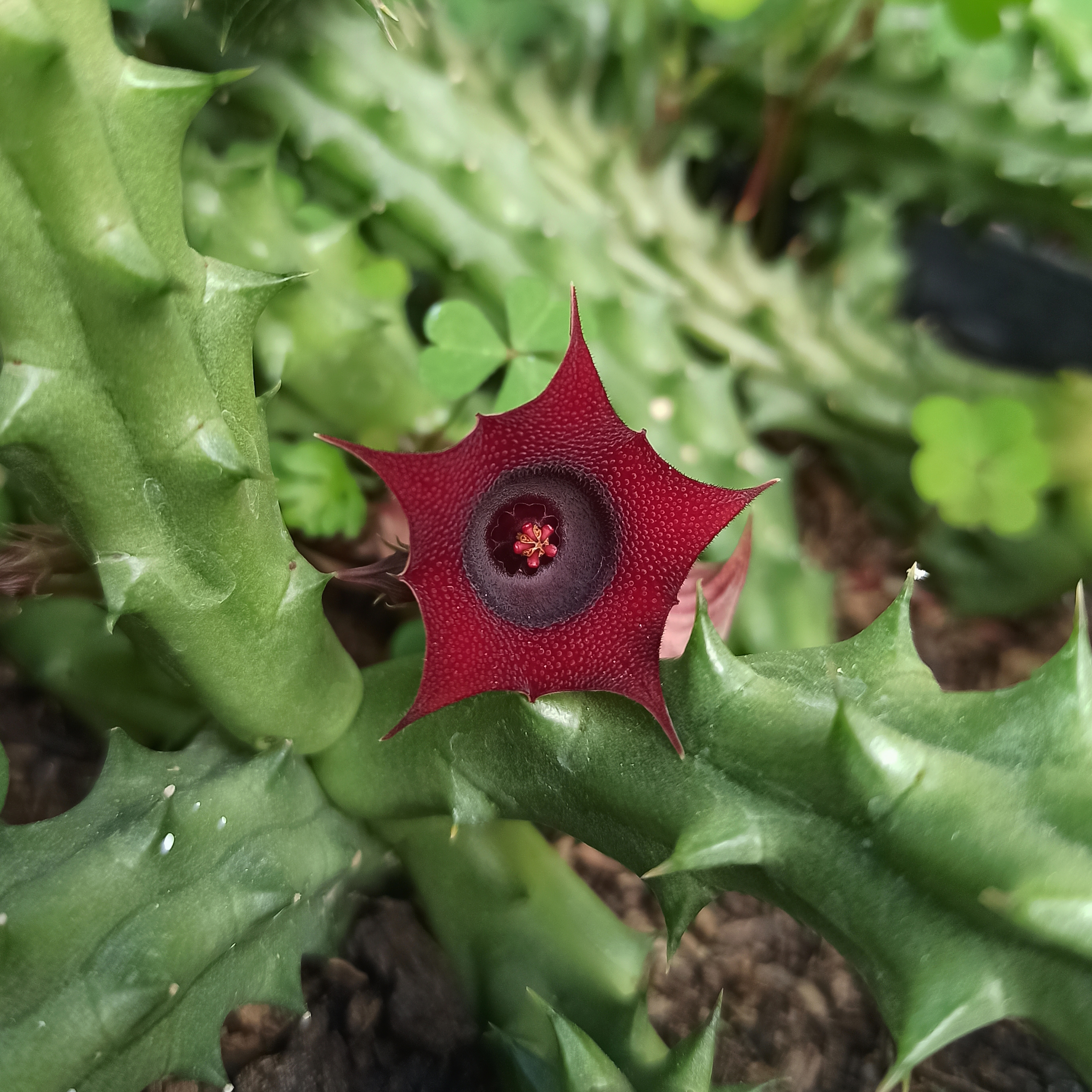
- A flowering Huernia Schneideriana

Scientific classification
- Kingdom: Plantae
- Clade: Tracheophytes
- Clade: Angiosperms
- Clade: Eudicots
- Clade: Asterids
- Order: Gentianales
- Family: Apocynaceae
- Genus: Huernia
- Species: H. schneideriana

Binomial name
- Huernia schneideriana A.Berger

= Huernia schneideriana =

Species of flowering plant

Huernia schneideriana, commonly known as the red dragon flower or medusa hair plant, is a perennial succulent in the dogbane and oleander family Apocynaceae, native to Tanzania in eastern Africa. The species is a popular houseplant because of its long, cascading leaves, and shallow crimson flowers. Introduced specimens of Huernia schneideriana have been spotted in Mexico, Honduras, Costa Rica, Panama, Venezuela, Ecuador, Brazil, and India.

== Description ==
Huernia schneideriana grows in a clumping manner with smooth, square stems that can be green to reddish, depending on sun exposure. These stems, which are typically 2 to 6 in (51 to 152 mm) long, but are able to grow up to 30 inches long, are lined with soft tooth-like tubercles that are rigid, but not very sharp. The flowers are small, funnel-shaped, and grow on short pedicels from the base of the stems. They are typically a dark crimson or burgundy color with a velvety texture, and they often have a darker central ring. The flower petals are fused at the base, forming a funnel, and then spread outwards. A unique characteristic of the flowers is their lack of the characteristic rotting-meat odor, common in many other Huernia species that are pollinated by flies and beetles.

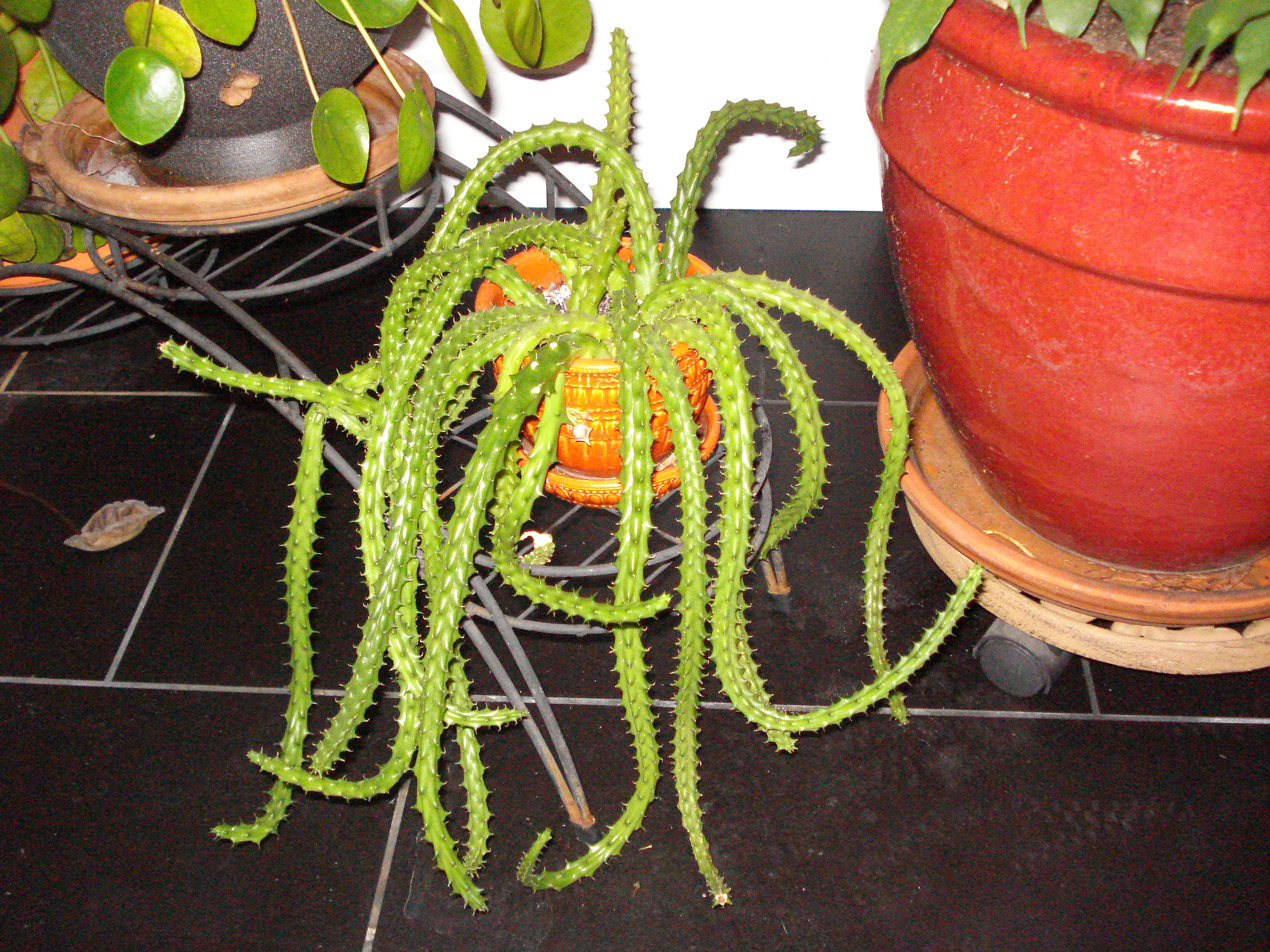
On very old specimens, stems can get to lengths of up to 30 inches

== Taxonomy and etymology ==
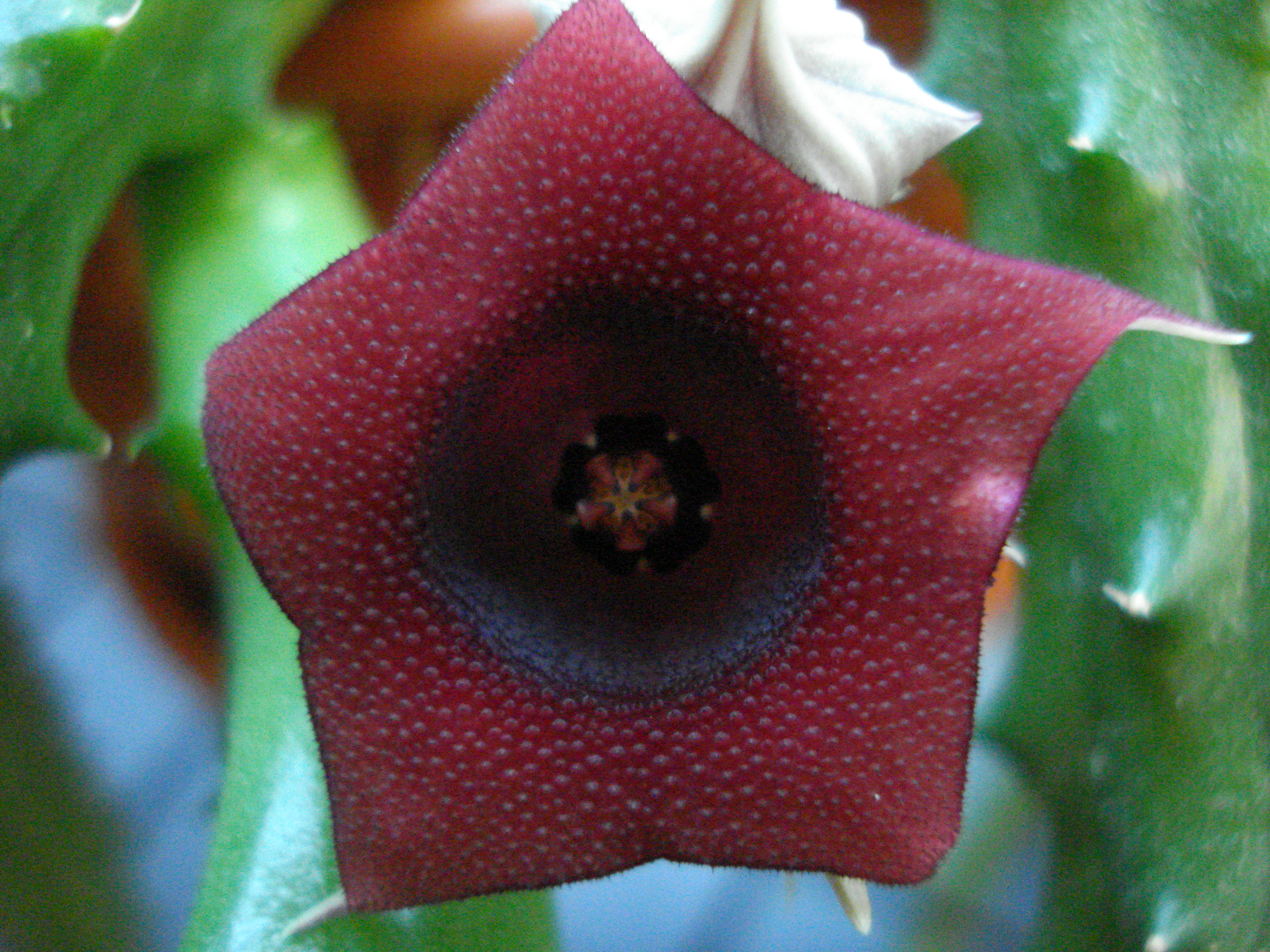
Close up of flower.

Huernia schneideriana was originally described by a botanist from Germany, Alwin Berger in 1913. For a somewhat long time, Huernia schneideriana was thought to be a natural hybrid of Huernia verekeri and Huernia aspera, but is now known as a distinct, unique species. The genus "Huernia" is a contribution to Johannes Heurnius, a Dutch botanist, physician, and missionary. Heurnius was recognized as one of the first Europeans to acquire and document plants from Cape of Good Hope, South Africa. The species' name was misspelled when the genus Huernia was formally described. The epithet honors Camillo Karl Schneider.

== Uses ==
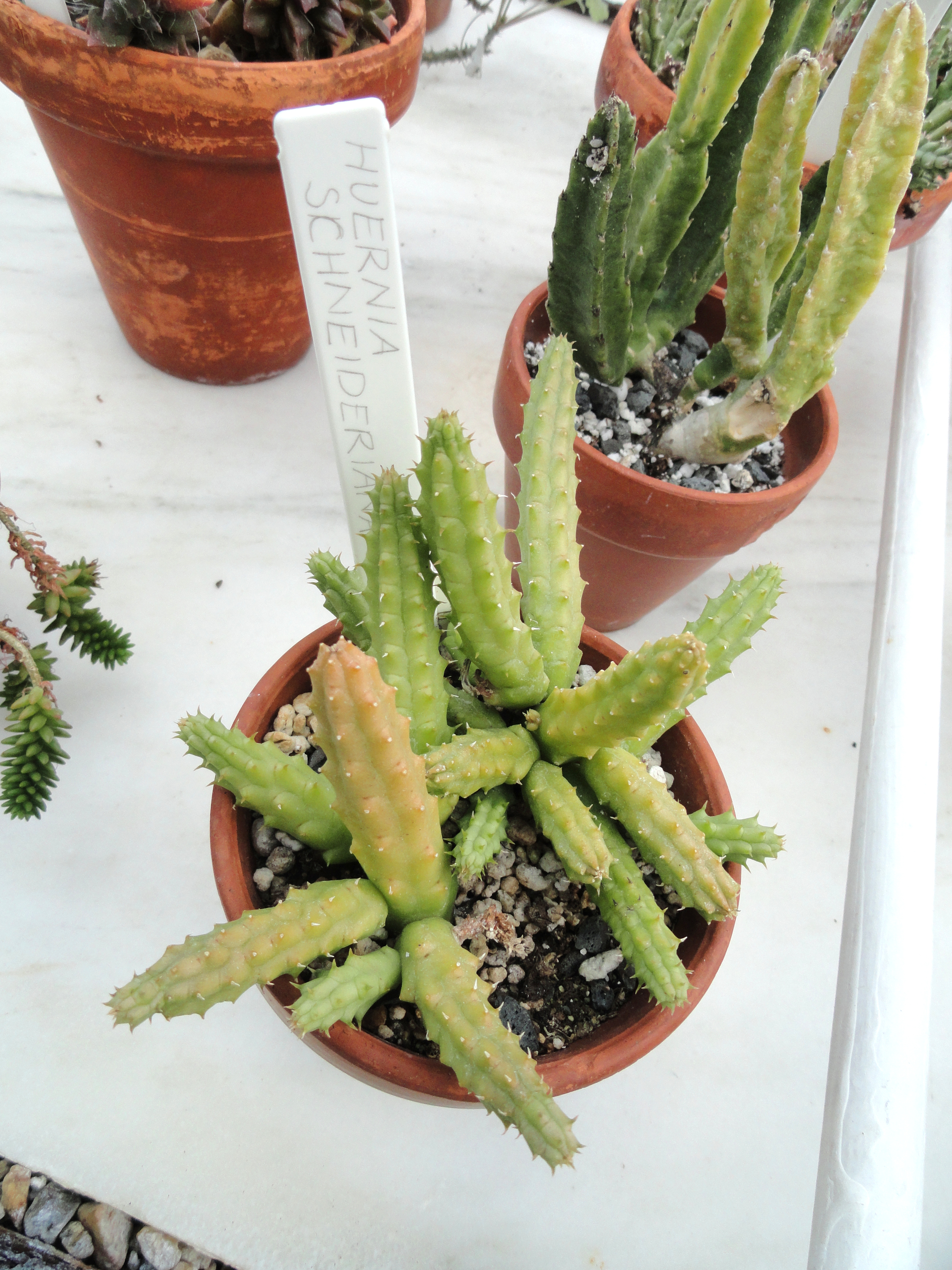
Potted in a greenhouse alongside other species in the genus.

The most common use of Huernia schneideriana is as a decorative plant. Huernia schneideriana is an ideal houseplant for bright indoor locations and can be grown outdoors in suitable climates (USDA hardiness zones 9-11). The unique stems and flowers of Huernia schneideriana make it an interesting conversation piece and a popular choice for succulent collections. In its native region, the stems of some Huernia species were allegedly boiled eaten as a famine food. However, this is not a common or recommended practice due to the plant's uncommon and nutrient-poor nature.
