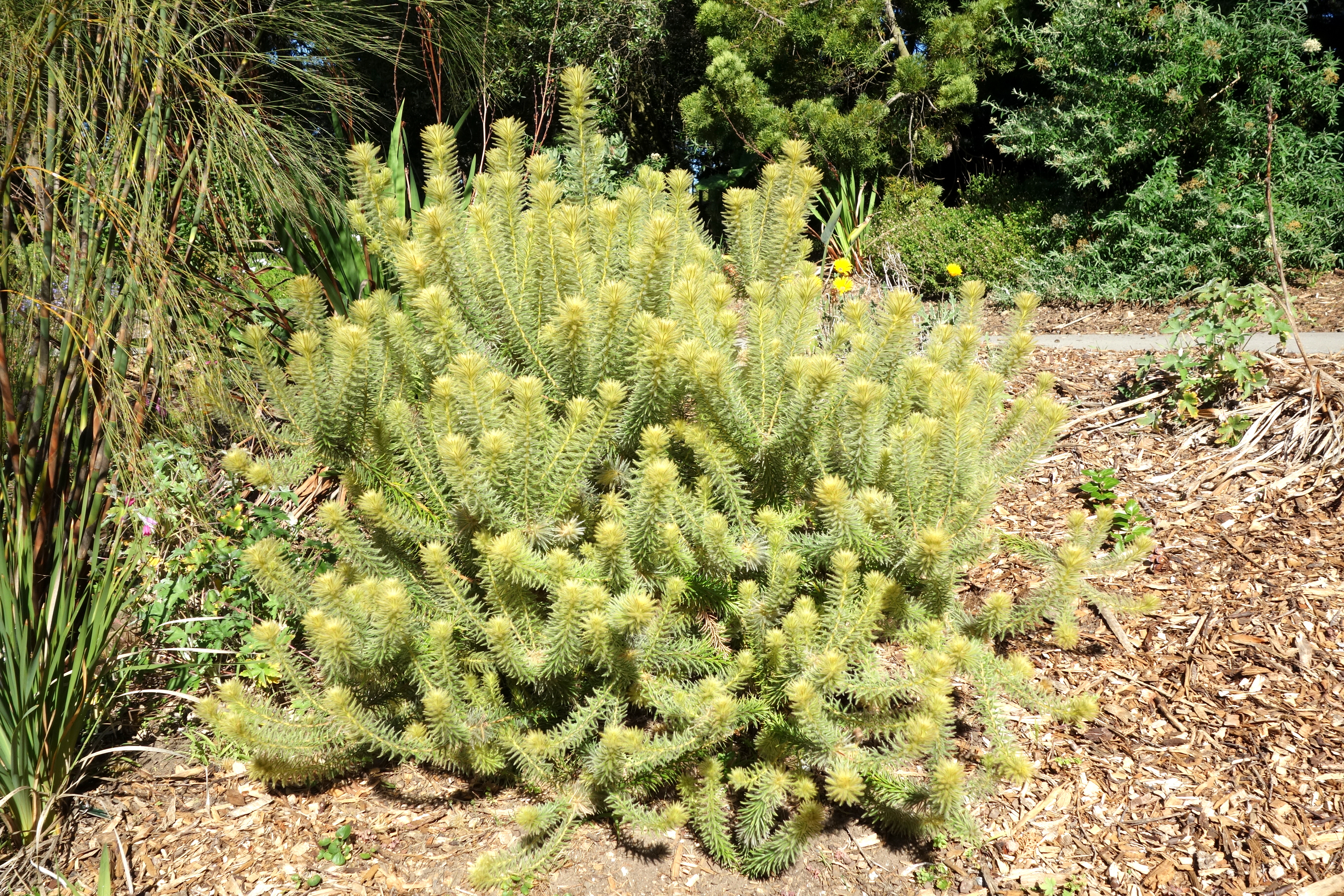
- Botanical specimen in the San Francisco Botanical Garden, San Francisco, California

Scientific classification
- Kingdom: Plantae
- Clade: Embryophytes
- Clade: Tracheophytes
- Clade: Angiosperms
- Clade: Eudicots
- Clade: Rosids
- Order: Rosales
- Family: Rhamnaceae
- Genus: Phylica
- Species: P. pubescens

Binomial name
- Phylica pubescens Aiton

= Phylica pubescens =

Species of flowering plant

Phylica pubescens, commonly known as featherhead or veerkoppie, is a species of flowering shrub in the family Rhamnaceae. It is endemic to the Cape Floristic Region of the Western Cape in South Africa, where it grows in fynbos on sandstone and limestone slopes and flats.

The species is valued as an ornamental shrub for its silvery foliage and distinctive cream-white flower heads. It is also cultivated commercially as a fresh and dried cut flower.

== Description ==
Phylica pubescens is an erect evergreen shrub typically growing 1.2 to 2 m (4 to 6.5 ft) tall. Its branches are densely clothed in narrow, leathery, hairy leaves, giving the plant a silvery-grey appearance. The branch tips terminate in flattened flower heads composed of feathery cream to buff-coloured bracts surrounding small white flowers with brownish tips and a faint cinnamon fragrance. Flowering occurs during autumn and winter (May to August) in its native range. The fruit is a hard, three-valved capsule that releases seeds bearing an elaiosome, which attracts ants.

== Taxonomy ==
The species was first described by the Scottish botanist William Aiton in 1789 in Hortus Kewensis.

Three varieties are currently recognised:

- Phylica pubescens var. angustifolia
- Phylica pubescens var. orientalis
- Phylica pubescens var. pubescens

== Distribution and habitat ==
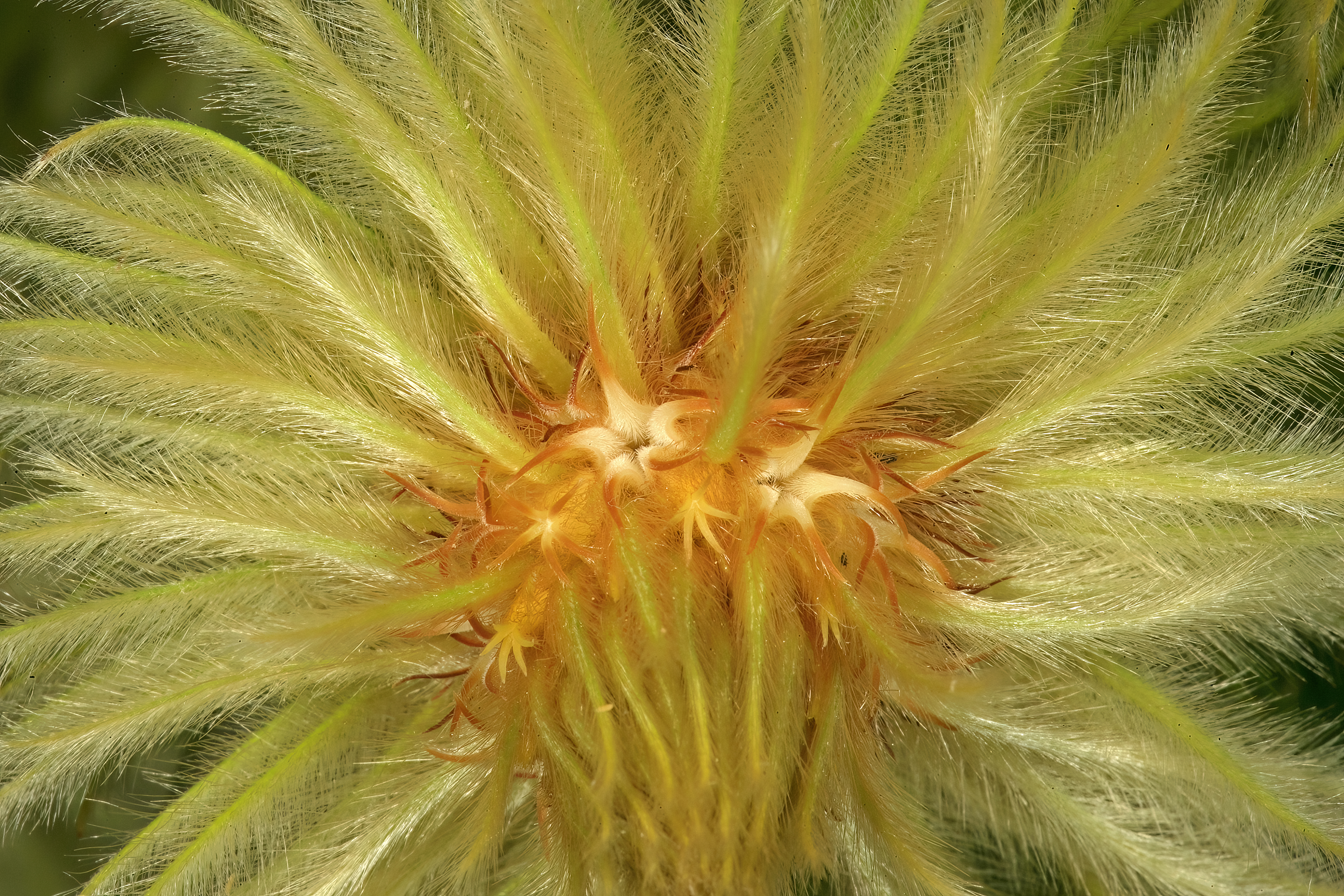
Flowerhead

The species is endemic to the south-western Cape of South Africa, ranging from the Cape Peninsula eastwards to Albertinia. It inhabits nutrient-poor, well-drained sandstone and limestone soils within fynbos vegetation.

The flowers are visited by bees, flies and beetles, which are believed to act as pollinators. Seeds possess an elaiosome that attracts ants, which disperse them by carrying them back to their nests, a process known as myrmecochory.

== Cultivation ==
Phylica pubescens is cultivated in Mediterranean climate gardens for its ornamental foliage and flower heads. It grows best in full sun and well-drained acidic sandy soils and becomes drought tolerant once established. The flower heads are widely used in fresh bouquets and dried floral arrangements because of their longevity.

=== Cultivars ===
Several horticultural selections have been developed for the cut flower industry, including Hydra. This cultivar has been selected for its compact growth habit and prolific production of flower heads suitable for commercial flower production.
