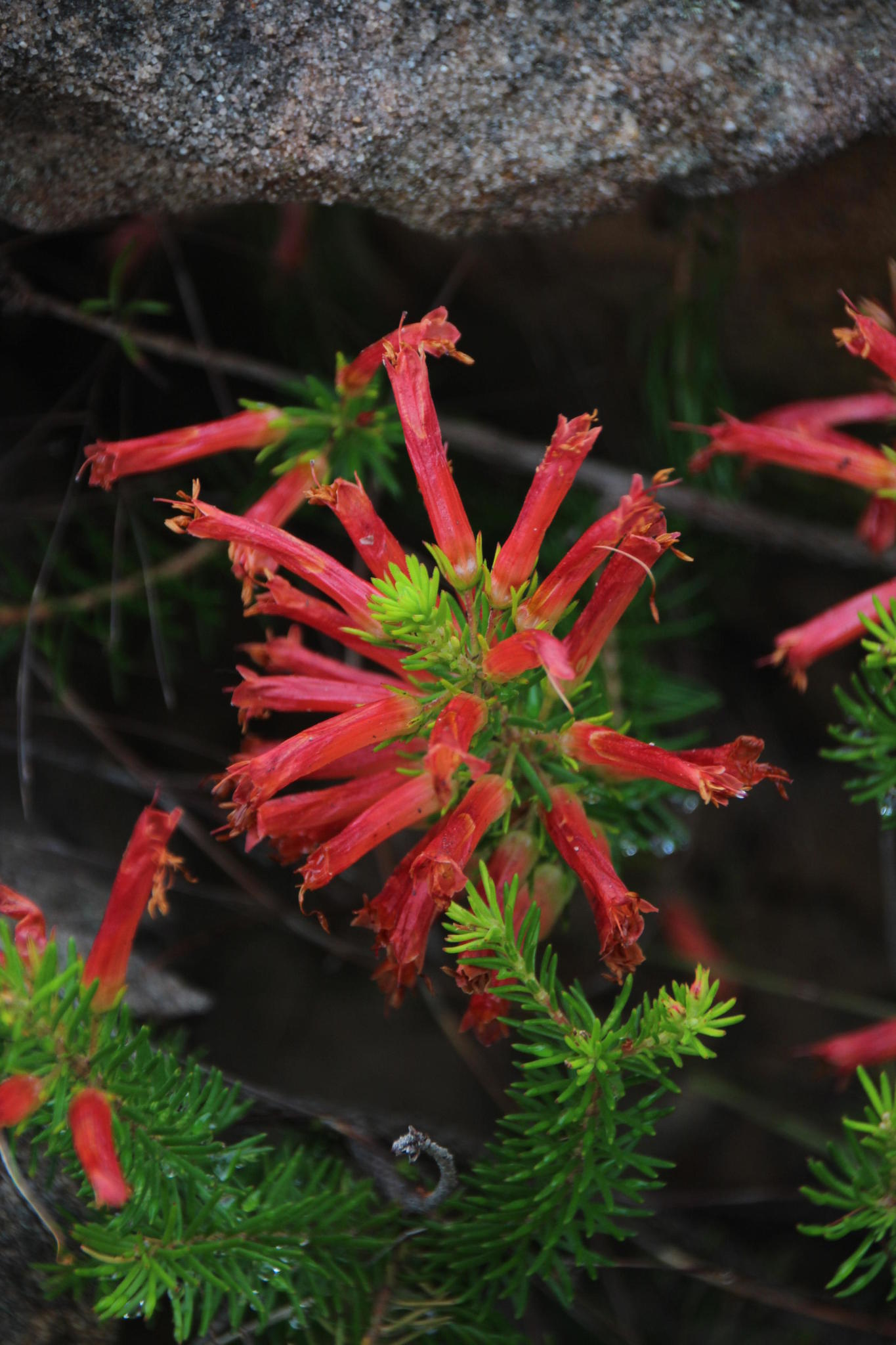

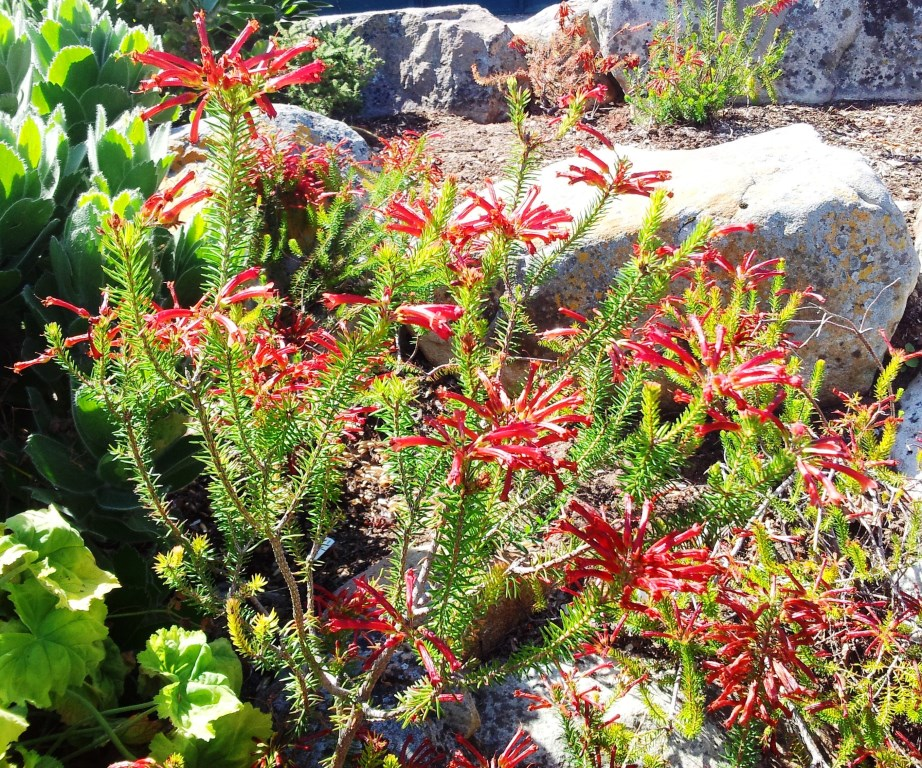

Scientific classification
- Kingdom: Plantae
- Clade: Tracheophytes
- Clade: Angiosperms
- Clade: Eudicots
- Clade: Asterids
- Order: Ericales
- Family: Ericaceae
- Genus: Erica
- Species: E. nevillei

Binomial name
- Erica nevillei L.Bolus, (1924)

= Erica nevillei =

Species of flowering plant

Erica nevillei, the red rock-heath, is a plant belonging to the genus Erica and is part of the fynbos. The species is endemic to the Western Cape. It occurs in the Cape Peninsula at Noordhoek Peak, Chapmans Peak, Constantiaberg and Kalk Bay Mountains. It sprouts and is stimulated by veld fires, the habitat is safe due to the high incidence of fires on Table Mountain.
