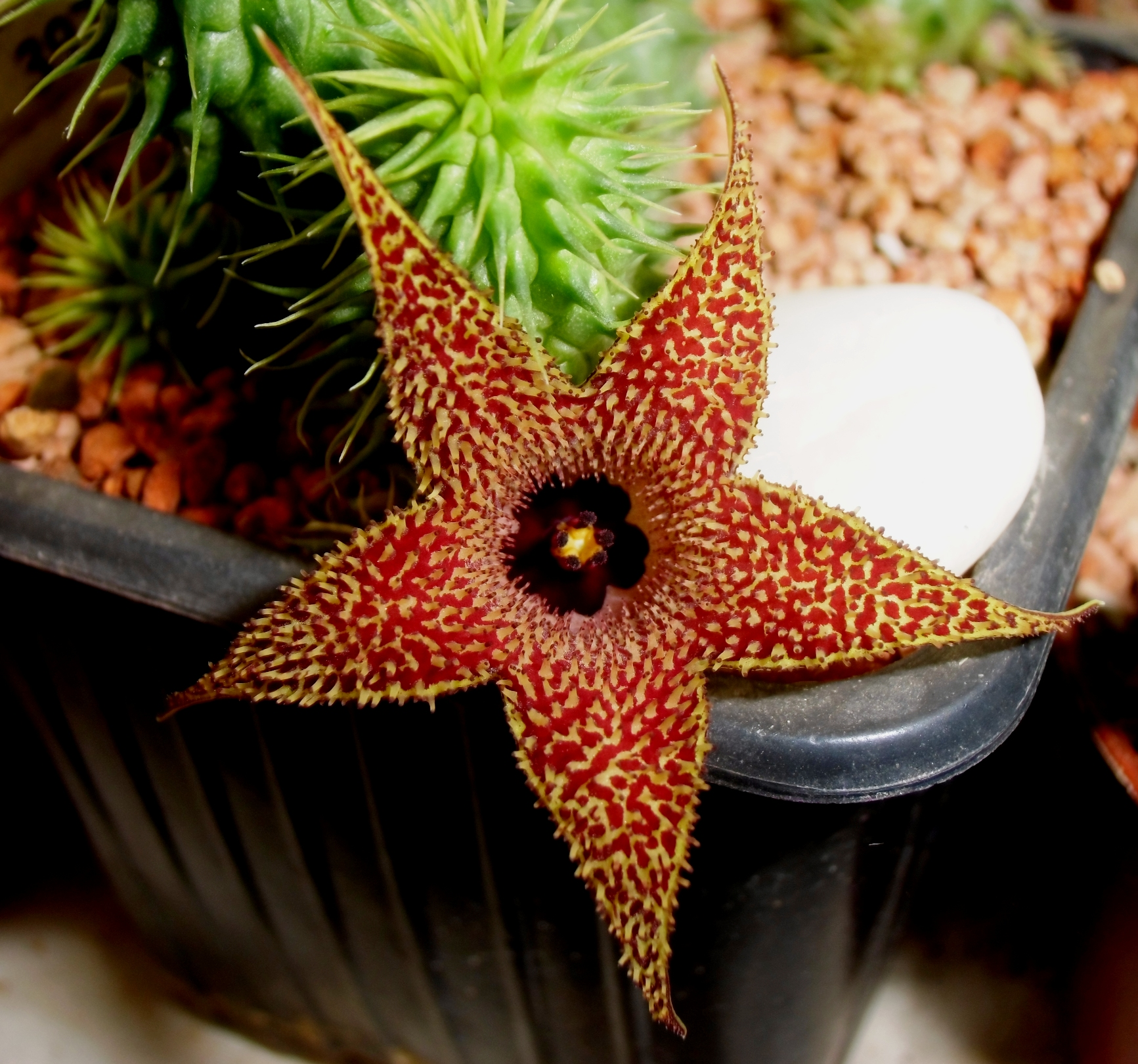
- Blossom

Scientific classification
- Kingdom: Plantae
- Clade: Embryophytes
- Clade: Tracheophytes
- Clade: Spermatophytes
- Clade: Angiosperms
- Clade: Eudicots
- Clade: Asterids
- Order: Gentianales
- Family: Apocynaceae
- Genus: Huernia
- Species: H. pillansii

Binomial name
- Huernia pillansii N.E.Br.

Synonyms
- Ceropegia pillansii (N.E.Br.) Bruyns

= Huernia pillansii =

Species of flowering plant

Huernia pillansii, called the cocklebur, is a species of flowering plant in the genus Huernia, native to the Cape Provinces of South Africa. A succulent, it has gained the Royal Horticultural Society's Award of Garden Merit as a hothouse ornamental.
