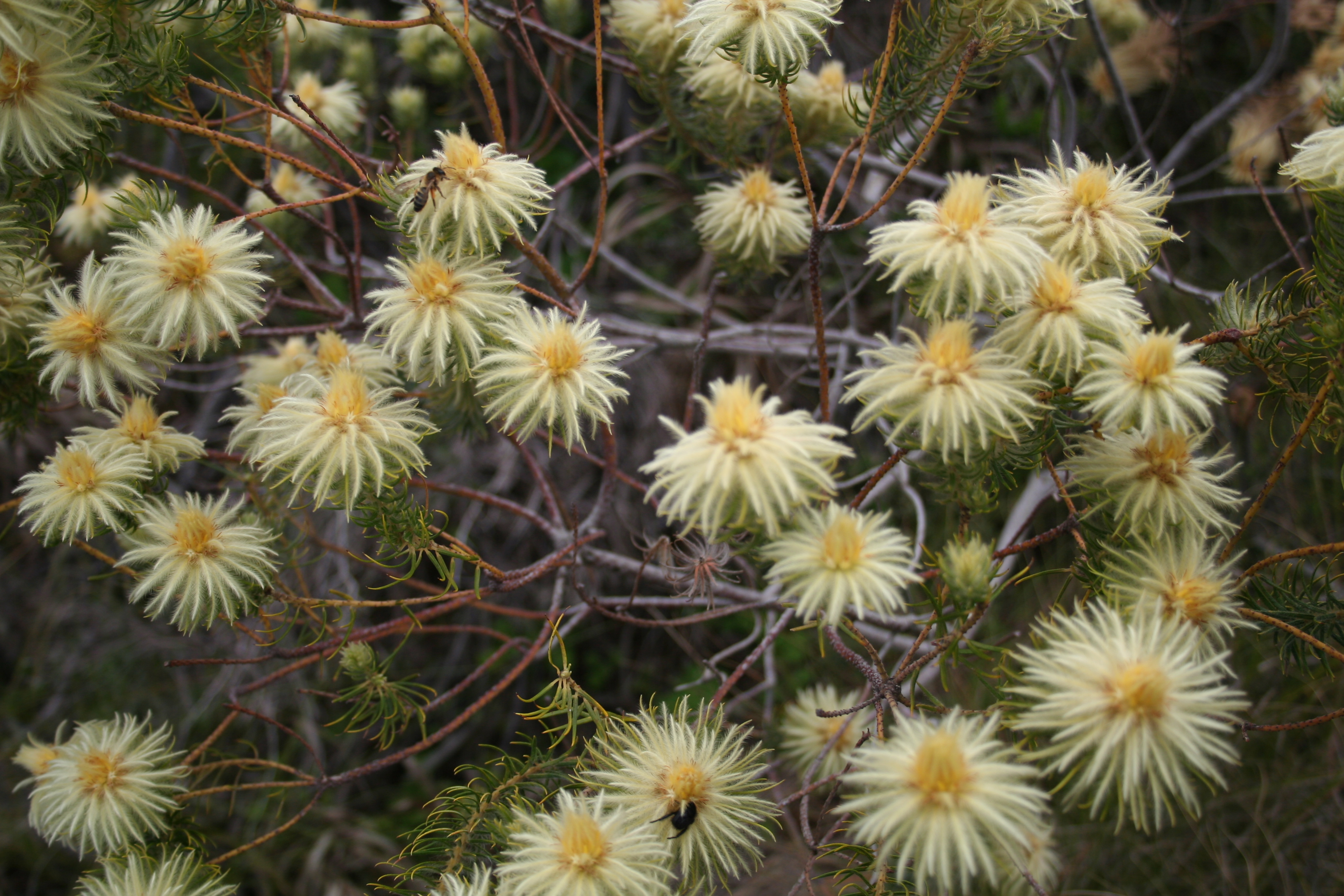
- Phylica pubescens

Scientific classification
- Kingdom: Plantae
- Clade: Tracheophytes
- Clade: Angiosperms
- Clade: Eudicots
- Clade: Rosids
- Order: Rosales
- Family: Rhamnaceae
- Tribe: Phyliceae
- Genus: Phylica; L.

= Phylica =

Genus of flowering plants

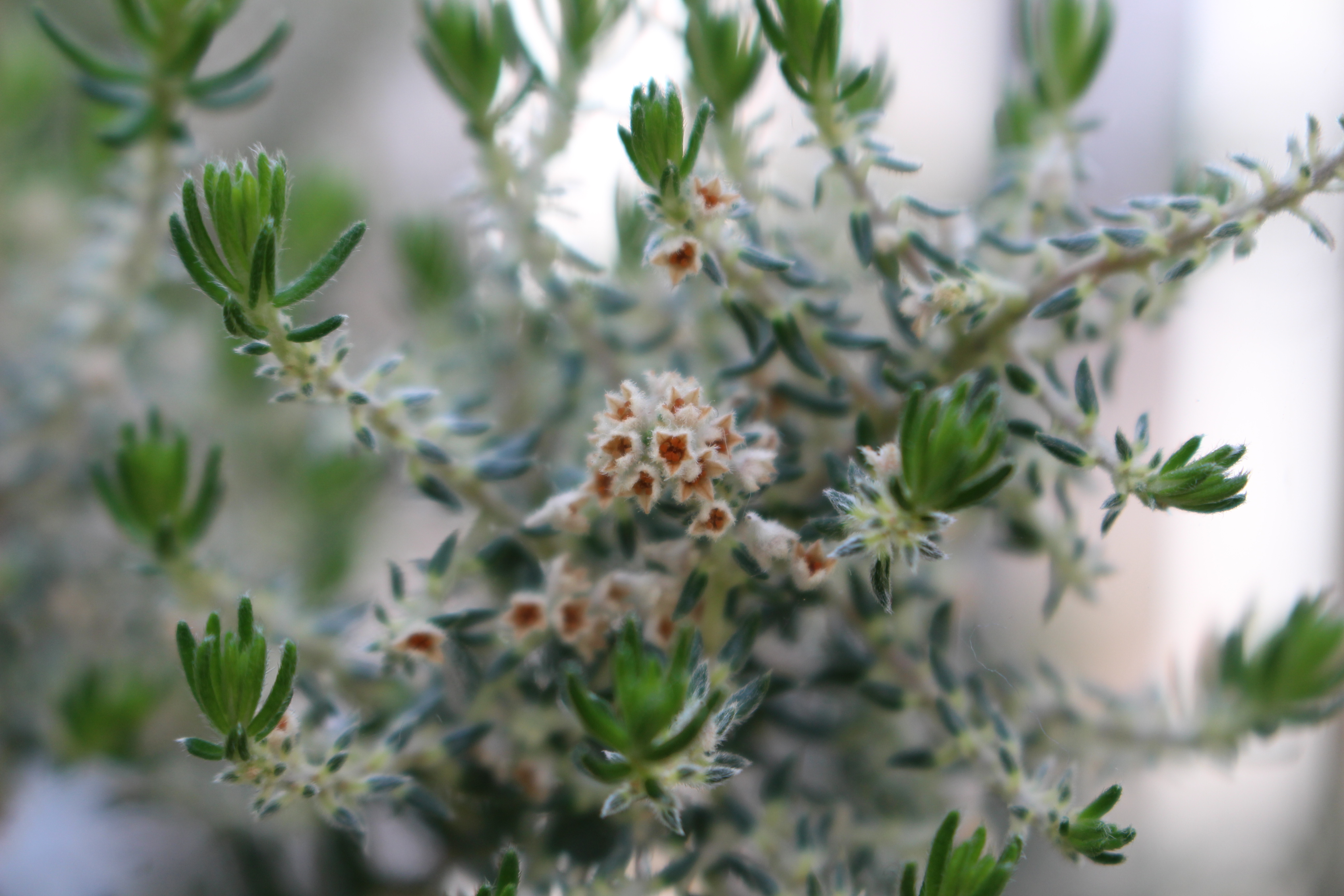
Phylica rosmarinifolia

Phylica is a genus of plants in the family Rhamnaceae. It contains about 150 species, the majority of which are restricted to South Africa, where they form part of the fynbos. A few species occur in other parts of southern Africa, and on islands including Madagascar, the Mascarene Islands, Île Amsterdam, Saint Helena, Tristan da Cunha, and Gough Island. Phylica piloburmensis from the Burmese amber of Myanmar, dating to around 99 million years ago during the mid-Cretaceous, was originally described as the oldest fossil member of the genus, but subsequent studies contested its assignment to the genus Phylica and even to the family Rhamnaceae, with one study placing it in the separate genus Nothophylica.

The genus name Phylica comes from the Greek φυλλικός (phullikόs) "of leaves, concerning leaves", as the stems are densely leafy in most of the species.

== Species ==
Species in the genus Phylica include:

- Phylica abietina Eckl. & Zeyh.
- Phylica acmaephylla Eckl. & Zeyh.
- Phylica aemula Schltr.
- Phylica affinis Sond.
- Phylica agathosmoides Pillans
- Phylica alba Pillans
- Phylica alpina Eckl. & Zeyh.
- Phylica alticola Pillans
- Phylica altigena Schltr.
- Phylica ambigua Sond.
- Phylica amoena Pillans
- Phylica ampliata Pillans
- Phylica anomala Pillans
- Phylica apiculata Sond.
- Phylica arborea Thouars
- Phylica atrata Licht. ex Roem. & Schult.
- Phylica axillaris Lam.
- Phylica barbata Pillans
- Phylica barnardii Pillans
- Phylica bathiei Pillans
- Phylica bicolor L.
- Phylica bolusii Pillans
- Phylica brachycephala Sond.
- Phylica brevifolia Eckl. & Zeyh.
- Phylica burchellii Pillans
- Phylica buxifolia L.
- Phylica calcarata Pillans
- Phylica callosa L.f.
- Phylica capitata Thunb.
- Phylica cephalantha Sond.
- Phylica chionocephala Schltr.
- Phylica chionophila Schltr.
- Phylica comosa Sond.
- Phylica comptonii Pillans
- Phylica confusa Pillans
- Phylica constricta Pillans
- Phylica cordata L.
- Phylica costata Pillans
- Phylica cryptandroides Sond.
- Phylica curvifolia Pillans
- Phylica cuspidata Eckl. & Zeyh.
- Phylica cylindrica J.C.Wendl.
- Phylica debilis Eckl. & Zeyh.
- Phylica diffusa Pillans
- Phylica dioica L.
- Phylica diosmoides Sond.
- Phylica disticha Eckl. & Zeyh.
- Phylica dodii N.E.Br.
- Phylica elimensis Pillans
- Phylica emirnensis (Tul.) Pillans
- Phylica ericoides L.
- Phylica eriophoros P.J.Bergius
- Phylica excelsa J.C.Wendl.
- Phylica floccosa Pillans
- Phylica floribunda Pillans
- Phylica fourcadei Pillans
- Phylica fruticosa Schltr.
- Phylica fulva Eckl. & Zeyh.
- Phylica galpinii Pillans
- Phylica glabrata Thunb.
- Phylica gnidioides Eckl. & Zeyh.
- Phylica gracilis (Eckl. & Zeyh.) D.Dietr.
- Phylica greyii Pillans
- Phylica guthriei Pillans
- Phylica harveyi (Arn.) Pillans
- Phylica hirta Pillans
- Phylica humilis Sond.
- Phylica imberbis P.J.Bergius
- Phylica incurvata Pillans
- Phylica insignis Pillans
- Phylica intrusa Pillans
- Phylica karroica Pillans
- Phylica keetii Pillans
- Phylica lachneaeoides Pillans
- Phylica laevifolia Pillans
- Phylica laevigata Pillans
- Phylica laevis (Schltdl.) Steud.
- Phylica lanata Pillans
- Phylica lasiantha Pillans
- Phylica lasiocarpa Sond.
- Phylica leipoldtii Pillans
- Phylica levynsiae Pillans
- Phylica linifolia Pillans
- Phylica litoralis (Eckl. & Zeyh.) D.Dietr.
- Phylica longimontana Pillans
- Phylica lucens Pillans
- Phylica lucida Pillans
- Phylica lutescens (Eckl. & Zeyh.) D.Dietr.
- Phylica madagascariensis Reissek ex Engler
- Phylica mairei Pillans
- Phylica marlothii Pillans
- Phylica maximiliani Schltr.
- Phylica meyeri Sond.
- Phylica microphylla (Eckl. & Zeyh.) D.Dietr.
- Phylica minutiflora Schltr.
- Phylica montana Sond.
- Phylica mundii Pillans
- Phylica natalensis Pillans
- Phylica nervosa Pillans
- Phylica nigrita Sond.
- Phylica nigromontana Pillans
- Phylica nitida Lam.
- Phylica nodosa Pillans
- Phylica obtusifolia Pillans
- Phylica odorata Schltr.
- Phylica oleaefolia Vent.
- Phylica oleoides DC.
- Phylica paniculata Willd.
- Phylica papillosa J.C.Wendl.
- Phylica parviflora P.J.Bergius
- Phylica parvula Pillans
- Phylica pauciflora Pillans
- Phylica pearsonii Pillans
- Phylica pedicellata DC.
- Phylica pinea Thunb.
- Phylica pinifolia L.f.
- Phylica piquetbergensis Pillans
- Phylica plumigera Pillans
- Phylica plumosa L.
- Phylica polifolia (Vahl) Pillans
- Phylica propinqua Sond.
- Phylica pubescens Aiton
- Phylica pulchella Schltr.
- Phylica purpurea Sond.
- Phylica pustulata E.Phillips
- Phylica radiata L.
- Phylica reclinata J.C.Wendl.
- Phylica recurvifolia Eckl. & Zeyh.
- Phylica reflexa Lam.
- Phylica retorta Pillans
- Phylica retrorsa E.Mey. ex Sond.
- Phylica reversa Pillans
- Phylica rigida Eckl. & Zeyh.
- Phylica rigidifolia Sond.
- Phylica rogersii Pillans
- Phylica rosmarinifolia Thunb.
- Phylica rubra Willd. ex Roem. & Schult.
- Phylica salteri Pillans
- Phylica schlechteri Pillans
- Phylica selaginoides Sond.
- Phylica sericea Pillans
- Phylica simii Pillans
- Phylica spicata L.f.
- Phylica squarrosa Vent.
- Phylica stenantha Pillans
- Phylica stenopetala Schltr.
- Phylica stipularis L.
- Phylica stokoei Pillans
- Phylica strigosa P.J.Bergius
- Phylica strigulosa Sond.
- Phylica subulifolia Pillans
- Phylica thodei E.Phillips
- Phylica thunbergiana E.Mey. ex Sond.
- Phylica tortuosa E.Mey. ex Harv. & Sond.
- Phylica trachyphylla (Eckl. & Zeyh.) D.Dietr.
- Phylica trichotoma Thunb.
- Phylica tropica Baker
- Phylica tuberculata Pillans
- Phylica tubulosa Schltr.
- Phylica tysonii Pillans
- Phylica variabilis Pillans
- Phylica velutina Sond.
- Phylica villosa Thunb.
- Phylica vulgaris Pillans
- Phylica willdenowiana Eckl. & Zeyh.
- Phylica wittebergensis Pillans
