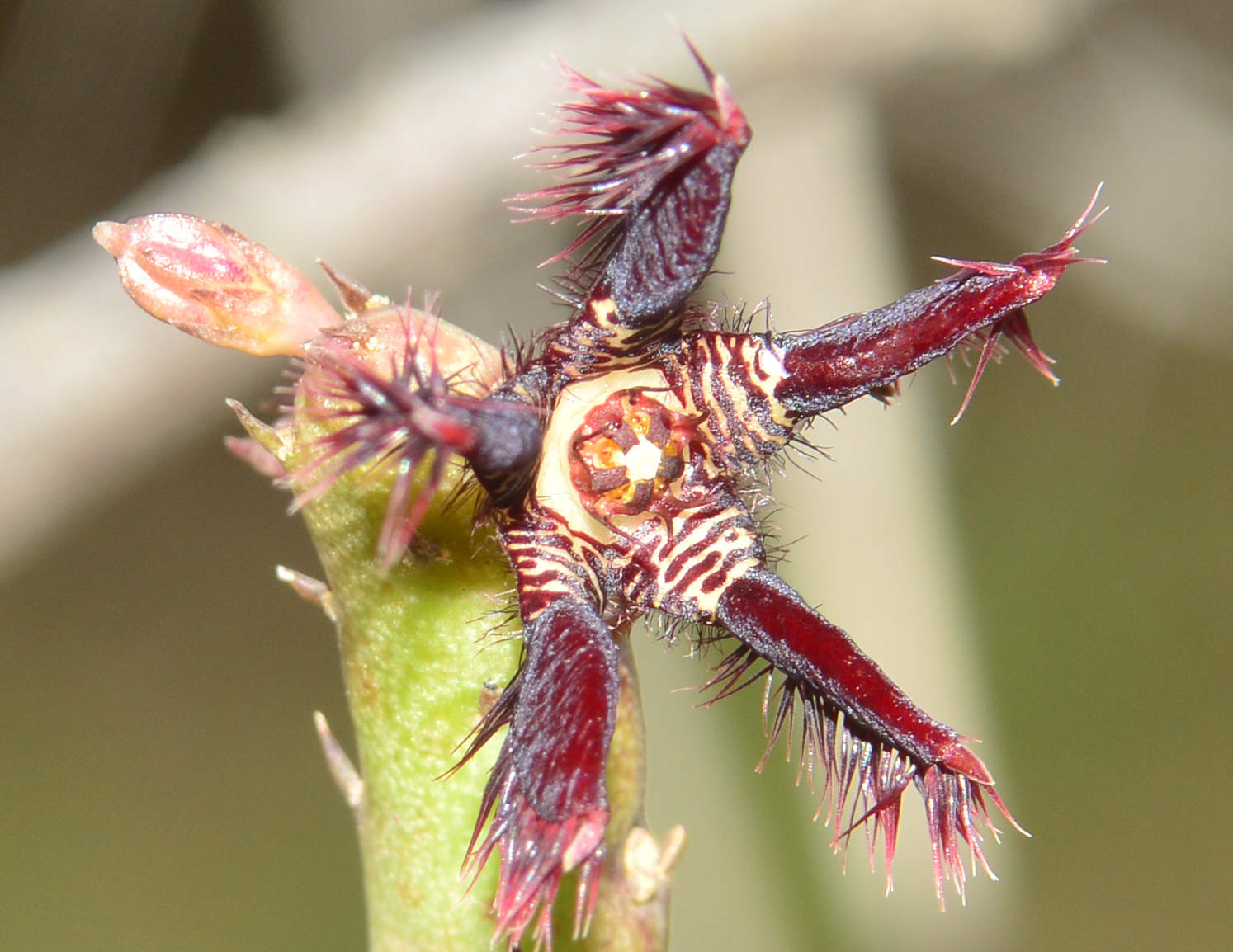
- Caralluma adscendens flower

Scientific classification
- Kingdom: Plantae
- Clade: Tracheophytes
- Clade: Angiosperms
- Clade: Eudicots
- Clade: Asterids
- Order: Gentianales
- Family: Apocynaceae
- Subfamily: Asclepiadoideae
- Tribe: Ceropegieae
- Genus: Caralluma; R.Br.

Species
- See text

Synonyms
- Sarcocodon N.E.Br. Spathulopetalum Chiov.

= Caralluma =

Genus of plants

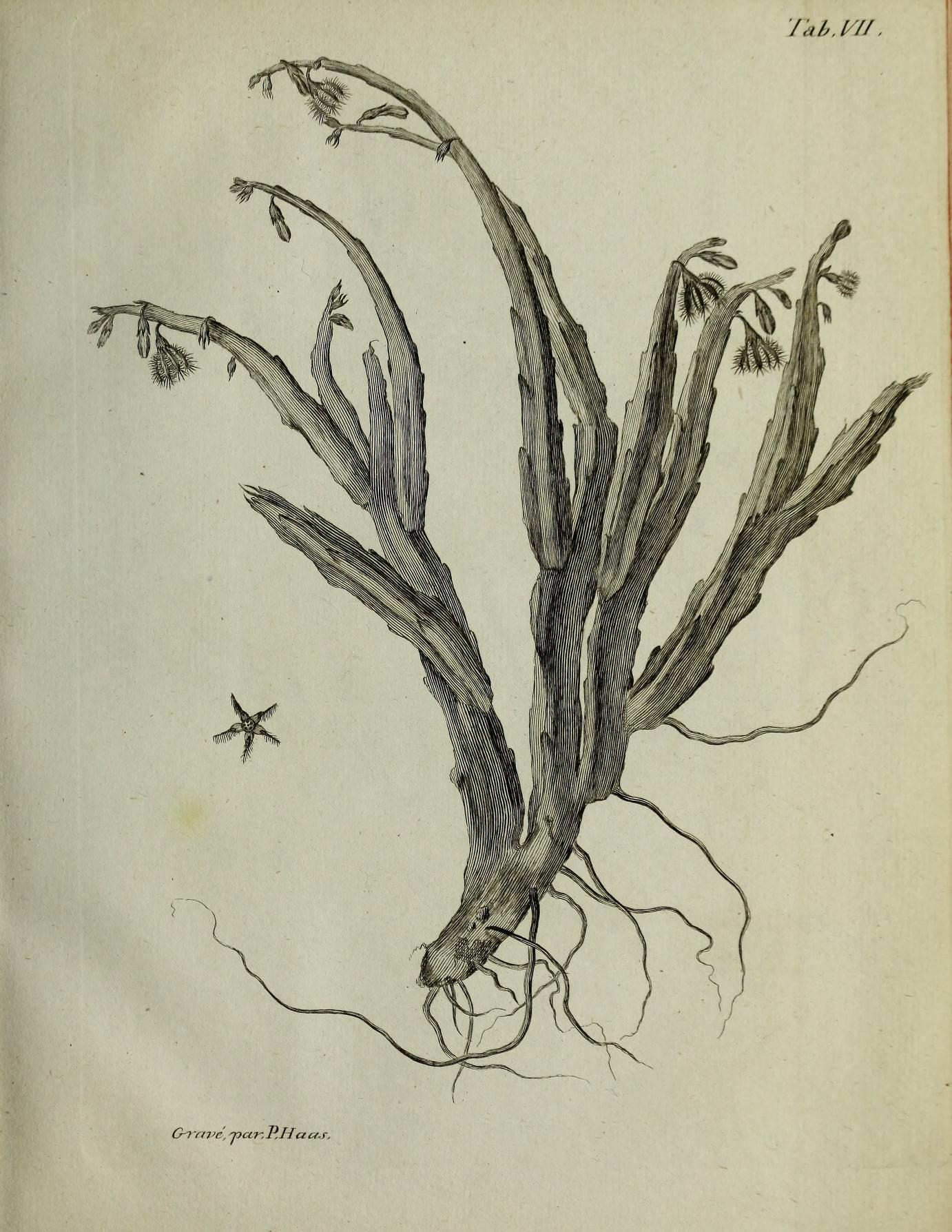
Caralluma subulata, Yemen

Caralluma is a genus of flowering plants in the family Apocynaceae, consisting of about 30 species.

In 1795 William Roxburgh published the name Stapelia adscendens for a plant found in India. He commented that the name for the plant in the Telugu language was Car-allum and that the succulent branches are edible raw, though bitter and salty. The name Caralluma was coined by Robert Brown for a new genus in an article published in 1811. At the time he only described one species in the genus, the plant that he renamed Caralluma adscendens.

In 1996 Helmut Genaust published the suggestion that it was sensible to conclude that the generic name is derived from the Arabic phrase qahr al-luhum, meaning "wound in the flesh" or "abscess," referring to the floral odour. Genaust was unaware that the genus Caralluma existed east of Palestine. He specifically ruled out its existence in India, where it was first described and named. Genaust presumed that the name would have first been applied to Caralluma europaea (now called Apteranthes europaea) in North Africa. In 2012, the editors of the Caralluma entry for the Flora Iberica addressed this suggested Arabic etymology: "... however, among the numerous common names for these plants in the Arab world, we have not found one that even comes close".

Species from the genus Caralluma occur in tropical Africa, the Arabian Peninsula, India, Sri Lanka and Myanmar. Several taxa are valued by people as food and for their medicinal properties.

== Accepted Species ==
As of July 2025, POWO accepts the following species:

- Caralluma adscendens
- Caralluma arachnoidea
- Caralluma attenuata
- Caralluma baradii
- Caralluma bhupinderiana
- Caralluma congestiflora
- Caralluma dalzielii
- Caralluma darfurensis
- Caralluma dicapuae
- Caralluma edwardsiae
- Caralluma fimbriata
- Caralluma flavovirens
- Caralluma furta
- Caralluma geniculata
- Caralluma gracilipes
- Caralluma lamellosa
- Caralluma longiflora
- Caralluma moniliformis
- Caralluma moorei
- Caralluma mouretii
- Caralluma peckii
- Caralluma petraea
- Caralluma plicatiloba
- Caralluma priogonium
- Caralluma sarkariae
- Caralluma stalagmifera
- Caralluma subulata
- Caralluma turneri
- Caralluma vaduliae
- Caralluma wilhelmii

=== Formerly placed here ===
- Apteranthes spp.
- Australluma spp.
- Boucerosia, including Boucerosia frerei previously Frerea indica.
- Caudanthera spp.
- Desmidorchis spp.
- Duvaliandra
- Echidnopsis spp.
- Monolluma spp.
- Notechidnopsis
- Orbea spp.
- Pectinaria spp.
- Piaranthus spp.
- Pseudolithos spp.
- Quaqua spp.
- Rhytidocaulon spp.
- Stapelia spp.
- Tromotriche spp.
- White-sloanea
