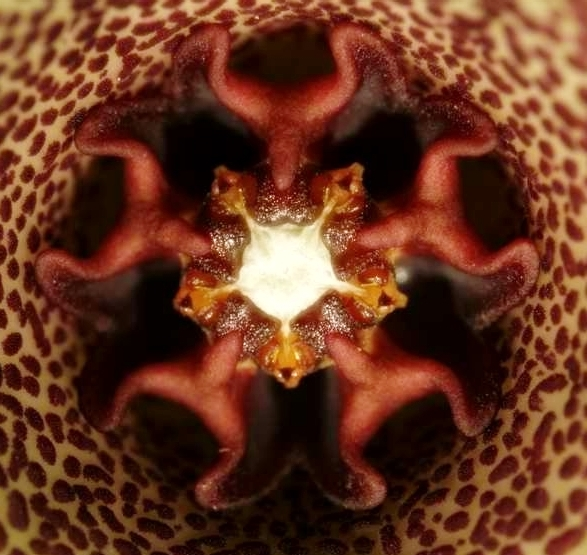
- Flower of Monolluma species

Scientific classification
- Kingdom: Plantae
- Clade: Tracheophytes
- Clade: Angiosperms
- Clade: Eudicots
- Clade: Asterids
- Order: Gentianales
- Family: Apocynaceae
- Subfamily: Asclepiadoideae
- Tribe: Ceropegieae
- Genus: Monolluma; Plowes

Synonyms
- Cylindrilluma Plowes; Sanguilluma Plowes; Sulcolluma Plowes

= Monolluma =

Genus of flowering plants

Monolluma is a genus of plants in the family Apocynaceae, first described as a genus in 1995. All the species had previously been included in the genus Caralluma, some also in Boucerosia, Cylindrilluma, Desmidorchis, Echidnopsis, Sanguilluma and Sulcolluma. Some members of the genus can be found in Oman, Saudi Arabia and Yemen in Arabia with Monolluma socotrana found on Socotra in the Indian Ocean, and in Ethiopia, Kenya and Somalia in Africa.

== Species ==
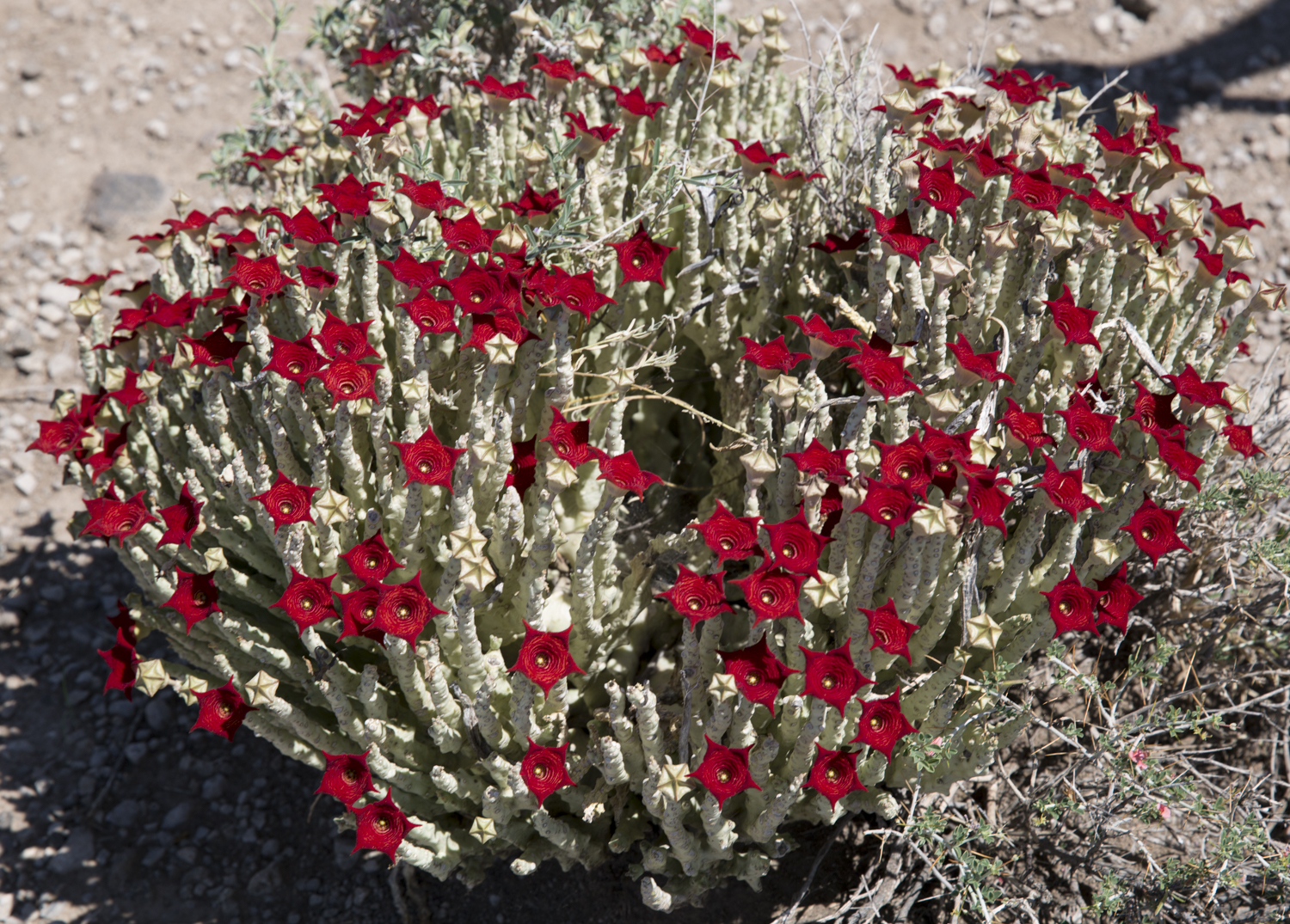
Monolluma socotrana, Kenya

As of June 2023, Plants of the World Online accepted the following species:

- Monolluma cicatricosa (Deflers) Plowes
- Monolluma hexagona (Lavranos) Meve & Liede
- Monolluma quadrangula (Forssk.) Plowes
- Monolluma socotrana (Balf.f.) Meve & Liede
- Monolluma solenophora (Lavranos) Meve & Liede
