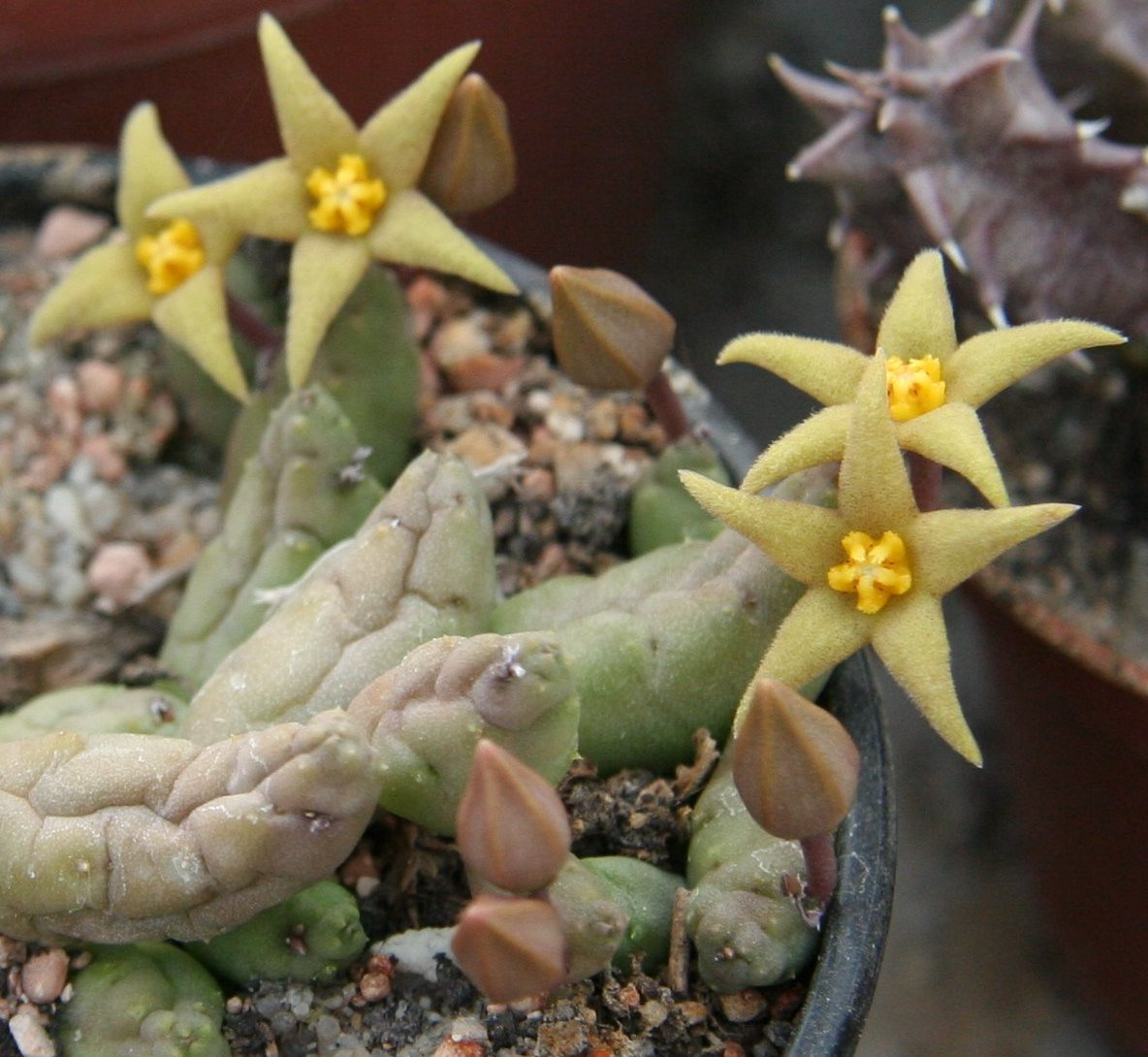
- Piaranthus geminatus in cultivation

Scientific classification
- Kingdom: Plantae
- Clade: Tracheophytes
- Clade: Angiosperms
- Clade: Eudicots
- Clade: Asterids
- Order: Gentianales
- Family: Apocynaceae
- Subfamily: Asclepiadoideae
- Tribe: Ceropegieae
- Genus: Piaranthus; R.Br. (1810)

Synonyms
- Huerniopsis N.E.Br. (1878); Obesia Haw. (1812)

= Piaranthus =

Genus of flowering plants

Piaranthus is a succulent plant genus in the subfamily Asclepiadoideae, in the family Apocynaceae.

It was first described in 1810. Its name comes from Greek and is descriptive of the fleshy, succulent flowers typical of the genus ("piar-" = fat, "-anthos" = flower).

== Description ==
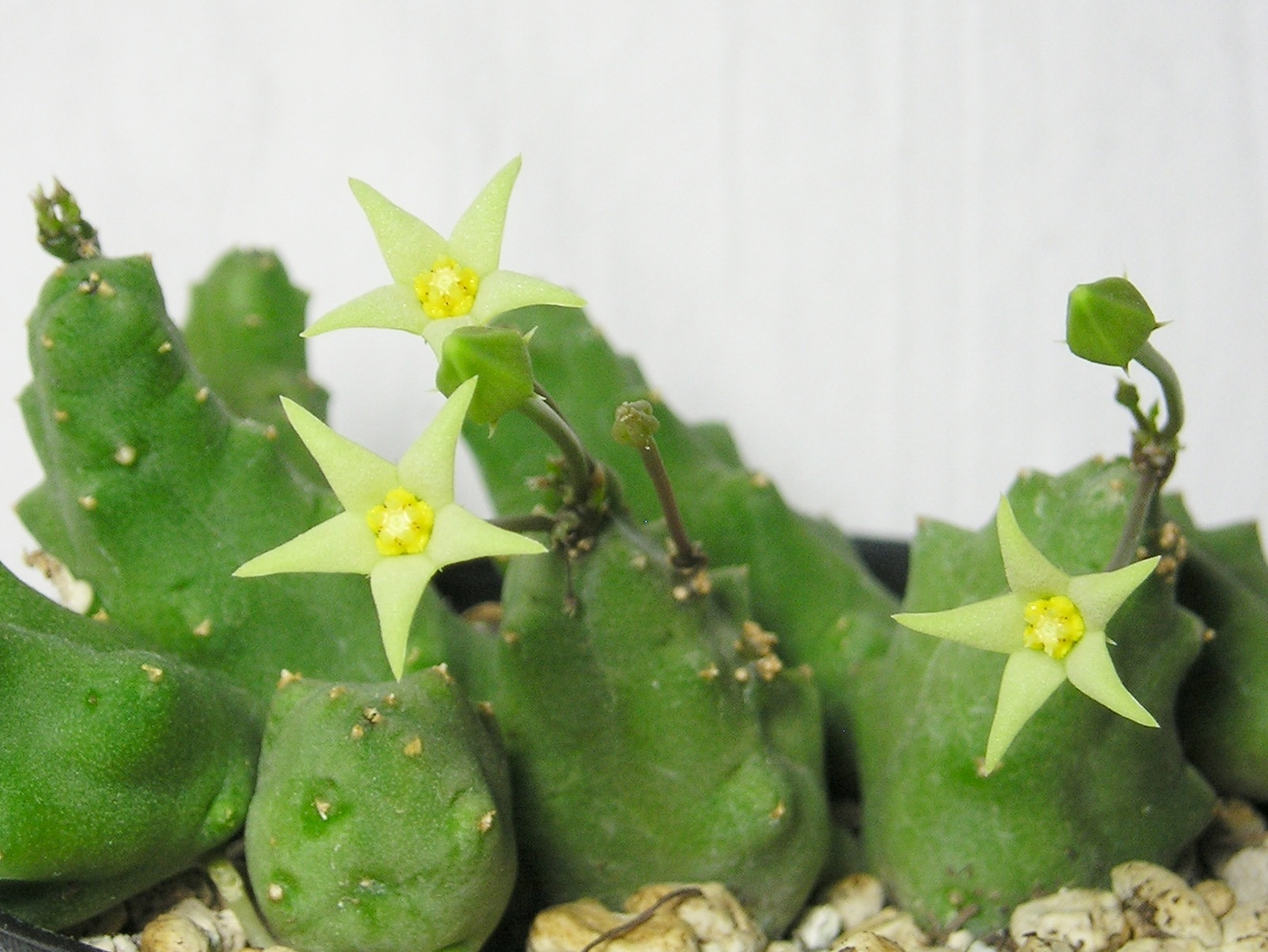
Piaranthus parvulus, from the Tankwa Karoo

The plants typically form flat, spreading mats of multiple offsetting stems. The stems are small, compact and four-edged. Tubercles (leaf remnants) appear along the four sides.

The flowers are small, fleshy, and bear five independent petals in a star shape. They appear in clusters, each flower up-turned, on a tiny inflorescence that sprouts from the tip of the stem. Each stem usually only produces a maximum of one inflorescence. The flowers of different species are in a range of colours; most emit unpleasant odours, especially the darker red or brown coloured ones.

The compact, mat-forming stems are very similar to those of the related genus Duvalia, and the two are often confused when not in flower. However the stems of Piaranthus have four sides (in cross-section), while those of Duvalia often have more.

== Distribution ==
The genus Piaranthus is restricted to the western part of Southern Africa. It occurs in arid, sandy areas, in the shade of bushes.

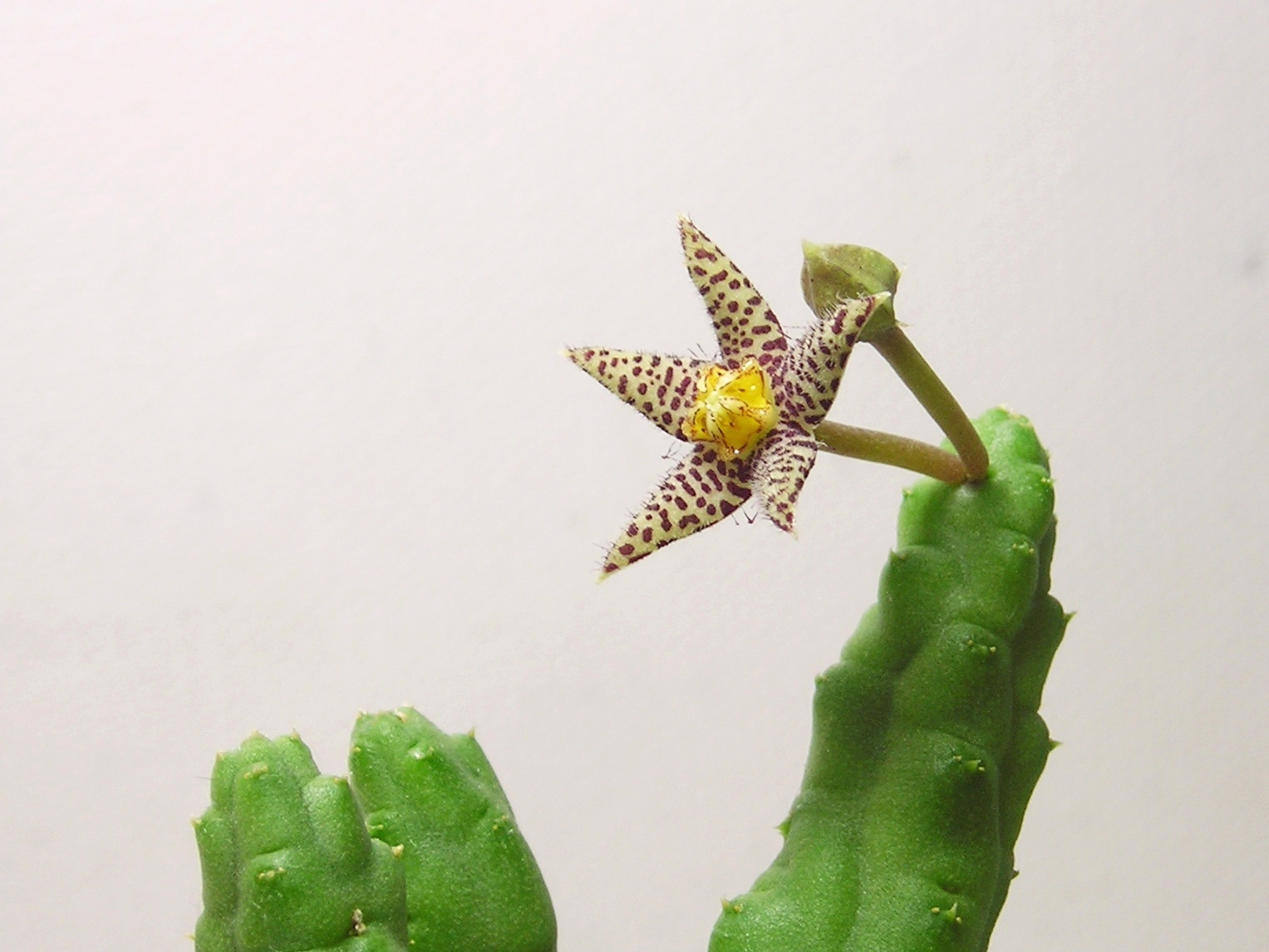
Piaranthus comptus ("comptus" = "adorned") from the Gamka Karoo.

Species

1. Piaranthus atrosanguineus (N.E.Br.) Bruyns - Botswana
2. Piaranthus comptus N.E.Br. - South Africa
3. Piaranthus cornutus N.E.Br. - South Africa
4. Piaranthus decipiens (N.E.Br.) Bruyns - Western Cape Province
5. Piaranthus decorus (Masson) N.E. Br. - South Africa
6. Piaranthus disparilis N.E. Br. - South Africa
7. Piaranthus fasciculatus (Thunb.) Schult. - Western Cape Province
8. Piaranthus framesii Pillans - Cape Province
9. Piaranthus geminatus (Masson) N.E.Br. - South Africa
10. Piaranthus globosus A.C.White & B.Sloane - South Africa
11. Piaranthus mennellii C.A.Lückh. - Cape Province
12. Piaranthus pallidus C.A.Lückh. - Cape Province
13. Piaranthus parvulus N.E.Br. - Cape Province
14. Piaranthus pullus (Aiton) Haw.
15. Piaranthus punctatus (Masson) R. Br. ex Schult. - South Africa
16. Piaranthus ruschii Nel - Pockenbank in Namibia

formerly included

species transferred to other genera (Caralluma, Hoodia, Huerniopsis, Quaqua)

1. P. grivanus now Huerniopsis decipiens
2. P. gussoneanus now Caralluma europaea
3. P. incarnatus now Quaqua incarnata
4. P. pilifer now Hoodia pilifera

Taxonomy

Phylogenetic studies have shown the genus to be monophyletic, and to be very closely related to the genera Orbea and Stapelia. More distantly related are the genera Huernia and Tavaresia.
