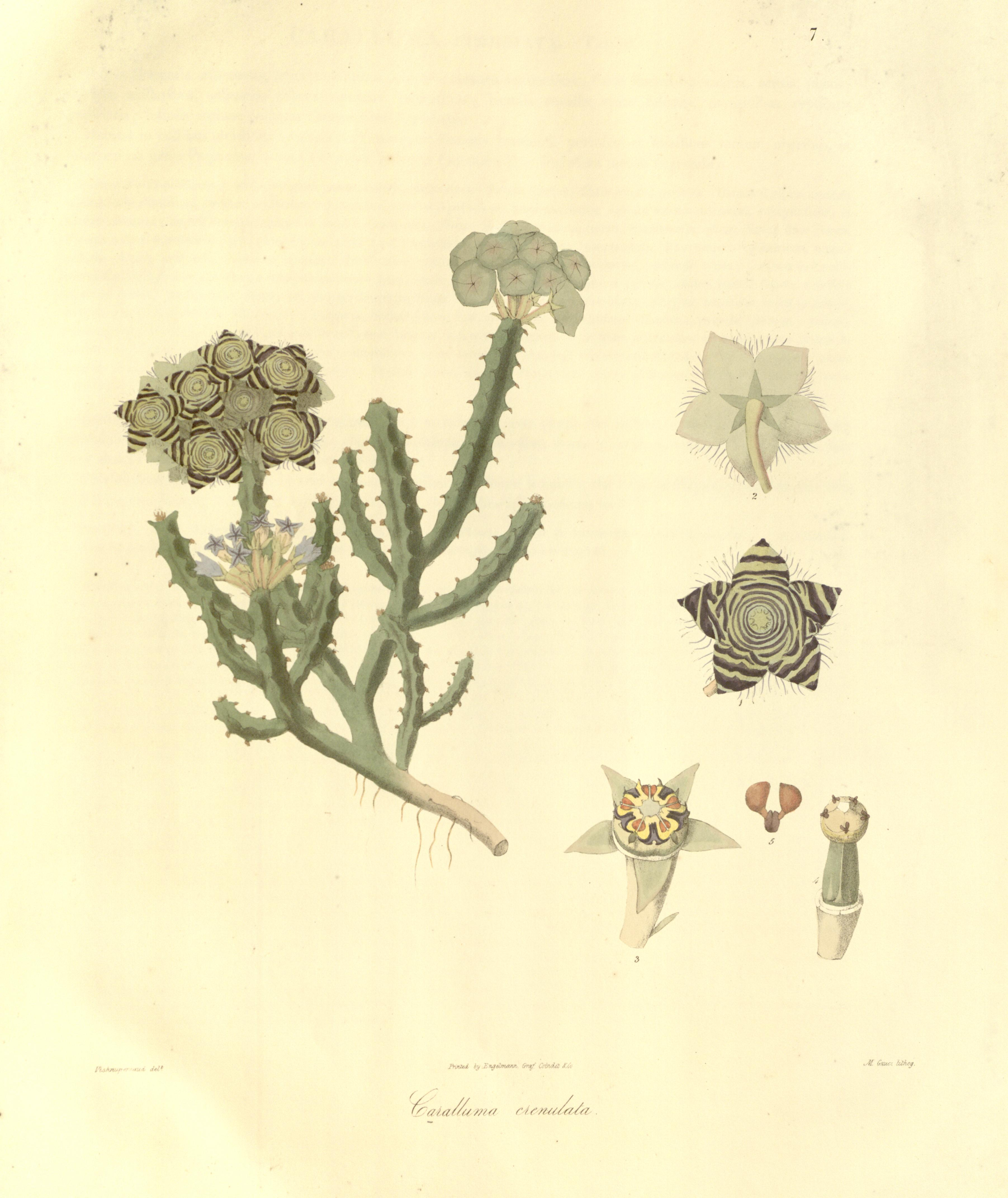

Scientific classification
- Kingdom: Plantae
- Clade: Embryophytes
- Clade: Tracheophytes
- Clade: Spermatophytes
- Clade: Angiosperms
- Clade: Eudicots
- Clade: Asterids
- Order: Gentianales
- Family: Apocynaceae
- Genus: Caralluma
- Species: C. crenulata

Binomial name
- Caralluma crenulata Wall.

= Caralluma crenulata =

Species of plant

Caralluma crenulata is a succulent, superficially cactus-like species in the plant family Apocynaceae, genus Caralluma.

It is native to Myanmar and is cultivated in gardens around the world for its red and yellow striped flowers that emit a strong odor.
