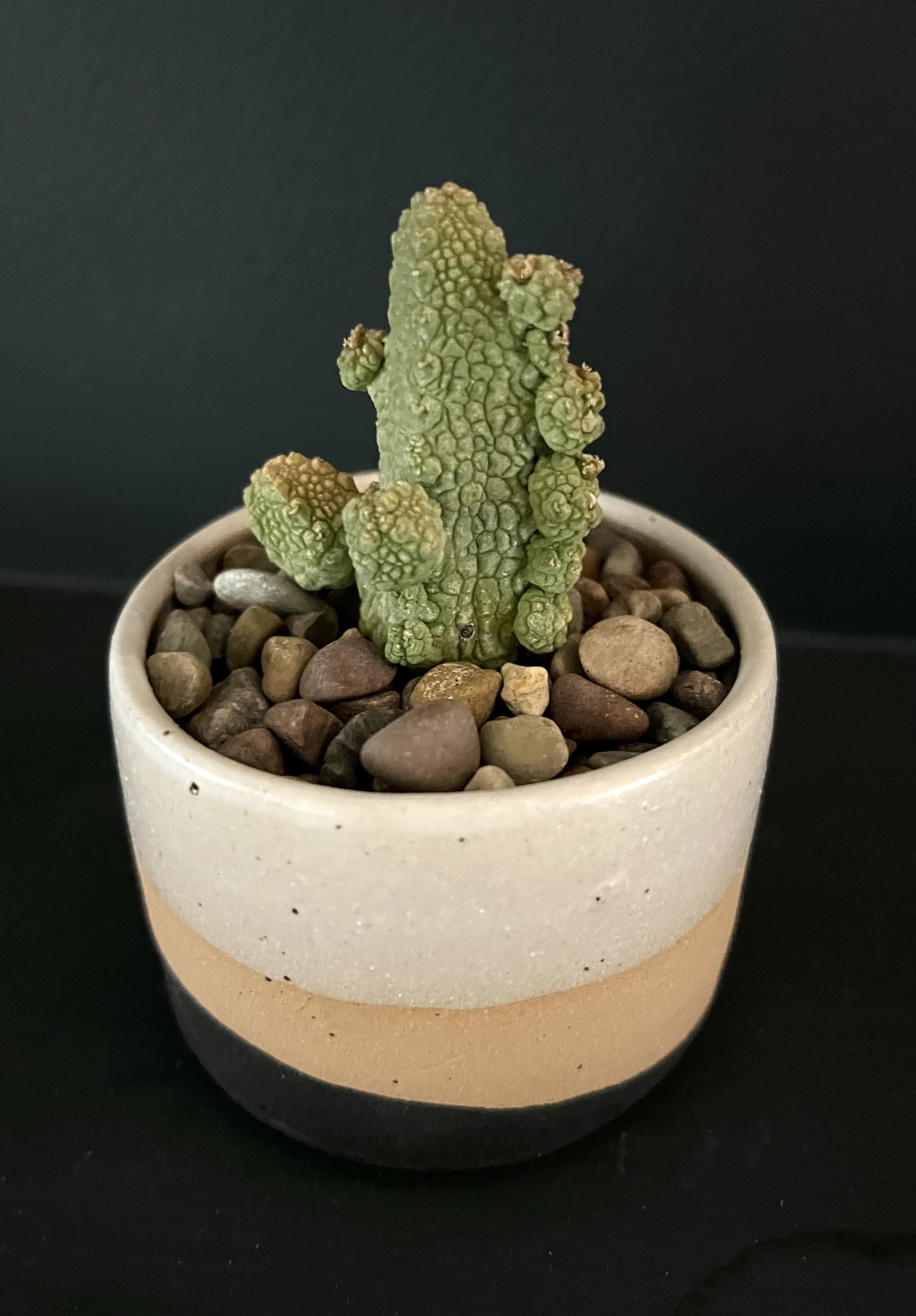
- P. caput-viperae in cultivation

Scientific classification
- Kingdom: Plantae
- Clade: Tracheophytes
- Clade: Angiosperms
- Clade: Eudicots
- Clade: Asterids
- Order: Gentianales
- Family: Apocynaceae
- Genus: Pseudolithos
- Species: P. caput-viperae

Binomial name
- Pseudolithos caput-viperae Lavranos

= Pseudolithos caput-viperae =

Species of plant

Pseudolithos caput-viperae is a species of succulent plant in the genus Pseudolithos. It is a small, leafless plant up to 15–40 millimetres (0.59–1.57 in) tall and either green or brownish. First discovered and described in the 1970s by botanists John Jacob Lavranos and Renato Bavazzano, it is native to Somalia. The seedlings of the plant are identical to Pseudolithos migiurtinus, but start to branch after a year, making this the only member of Pseudolithos that is not just a single squat stem. Its Latin species name means "snake head".
