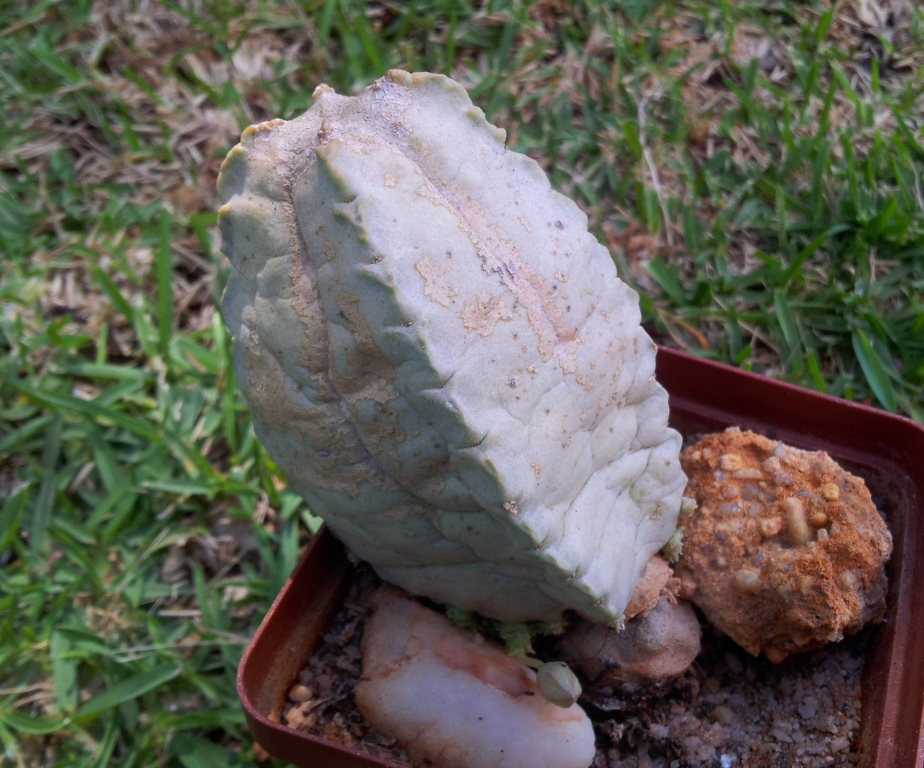
- Whitesloanea crassa

Scientific classification
- Kingdom: Plantae
- Clade: Tracheophytes
- Clade: Angiosperms
- Clade: Eudicots
- Clade: Asterids
- Order: Gentianales
- Family: Apocynaceae
- Genus: Whitesloanea; Chiov.
- Species: W. crassa

Binomial name
- Whitesloanea crassa (N.E.Br.) Chiov.

Synonyms
- Drakebrockmania A.C.White & B.Sloane; Caralluma crassa N.E.Br.; Ceropegia crassa (N.E.Br.) Bruyns; Drakebrockmania crassa (N.E.Br.) A.C.White & B.Sloane

= Whitesloanea =

Genus of flowering plants

Whitesloanea (also White-sloanea) is a monotypic genus of flowering plants belonging to the family Apocynaceae. It has only one known species, Whitesloanea crassa (N.E.Br.) Chiov.

It has an unusual odour, in that many believe it to smell of faecal matter. Some have postulated that the centre of the flower is actually meant to mimic an anal cavity.

It is native to north Somalia.

The species was first brought to the attention of European botanists when one was found in 1914 by Colonel Ralph Evelyn Drake-Brockman and sent to Kew Gardens. The plant flowered 5 years later and was described by N. E. Brown as Caralluma crassa and illustrated in colour by Matilda Smith. It is not known why that description was not published until 1935, the year after Brown's death.

The genus name of White-sloanea is in honour of Alain Campbell White (1880–1951), who was an American botanist, succulent specialist and chess player and also Boyd Lincoln Sloane (1815–1878), who was an American botanist and specialist in Cactaceae. White and Sloane had co-authored a book covering the known stapeliads (plants closely related to White-sloanea), published in February 1937 - The Stapelieae, an introduction to the study of this tribe of Asclepiadaceae, in three volumes with a total of 1,184 pages.

In volume 1 of The Stapelieae, White and Sloane had renamed Caralluma crassa N.E. Br. because the corona of the flower was distinct from all other Caralluma species. They chose to name it Drakebrockmania crassa (N.E. Br.) A.C. White & B. Sloane after the discoverer. The genus White-sloanea was circumscribed by Emilio Chiovenda later in 1937 in the journal Malpighia: rassegna mensile di botanica volume 34 on page 541. Chiovenda pointed out that Drakebrockmania was not a legitimate new genus because a type of grass had previously been named Drake-brockmania somalensis, though that is now called Dinebra somalensis.

Formerly placed here

Pseudolithos migiurtinus (Chiov.) P.R.O.Bally (as White-sloanea migiurtina Chiov.)
