= Australluma peschii =

Conservation status
- Least Concern (IUCN 3.1)

Scientific classification
- Kingdom: Plantae
- Clade: Tracheophytes
- Clade: Angiosperms
- Clade: Eudicots
- Clade: Asterids
- Order: Gentianales
- Family: Apocynaceae
- Genus: Australluma
- Species: A. peschii

Binomial name
- Australluma peschii (Nel) Plowes

Synonyms
- Caralluma peschii Nel; Ceropegia peschii (Nel) Bruyns

Species of plant

Australluma peschii is a species of plant in the family Apocynaceae. It is native to Angola and Namibia. Its natural habitat is dry savanna. It is threatened by habitat loss.
