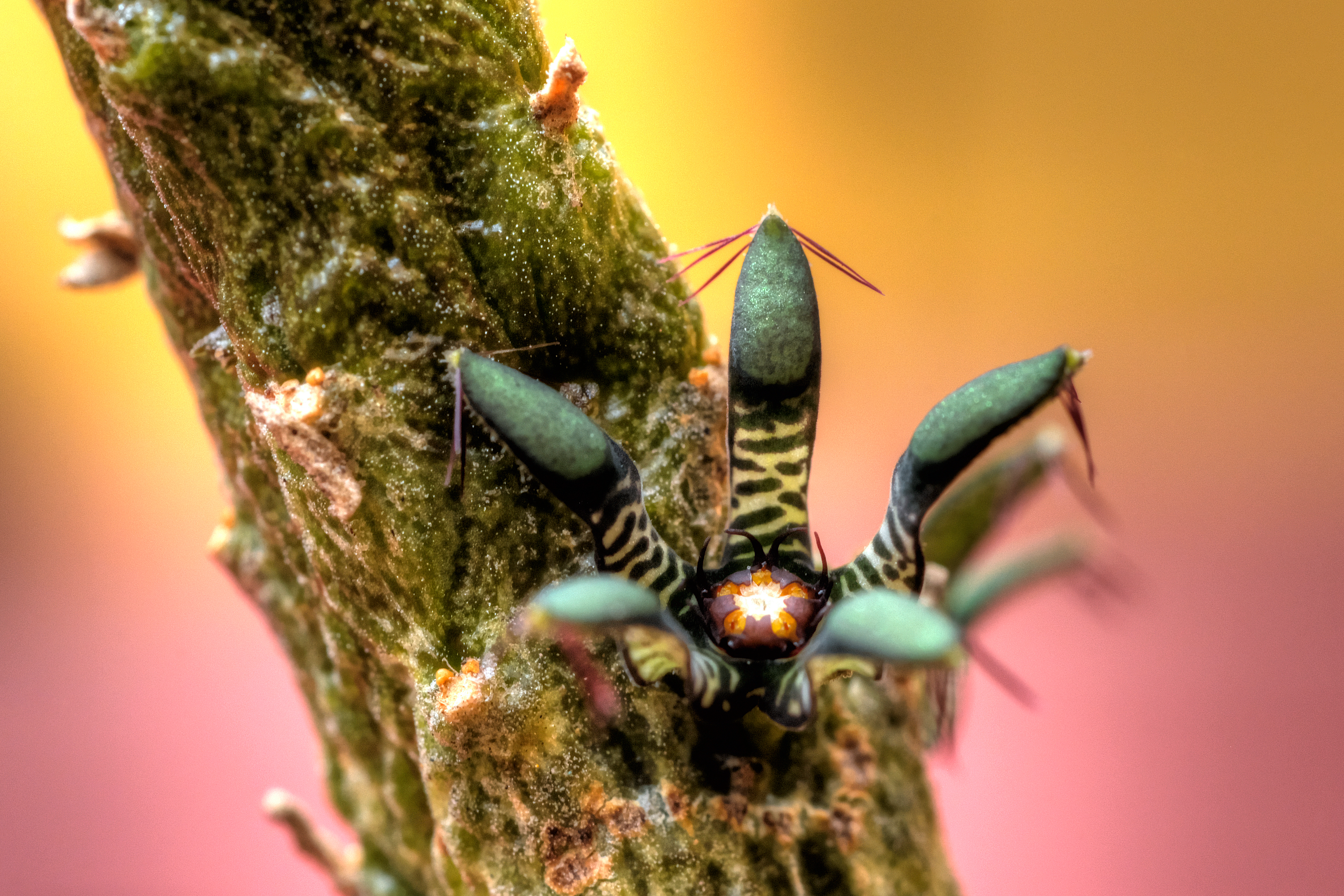
- Rhytidocaulon macrolobum

Scientific classification
- Kingdom: Plantae
- Clade: Tracheophytes
- Clade: Angiosperms
- Clade: Eudicots
- Clade: Asterids
- Order: Gentianales
- Family: Apocynaceae
- Subfamily: Asclepiadoideae
- Tribe: Ceropegieae
- Genus: Rhytidocaulon; P.R.O.Bally

= Rhytidocaulon =

Genus of flowering plants

Rhytidocaulon is a plant genus in the family Apocynaceae, first described in 1962. It is native to northeastern Africa and the Arabian Peninsula.

Species

Species accepted by the Plants of the World Online as of February 2023:

- Rhytidocaulon arachnoideum T.A.McCoy
- Rhytidocaulon baricum Thulin
- Rhytidocaulon ciliatum Hanácek & Ricánek
- Rhytidocaulon elegantissimum Hanácek & Ricánek
- Rhytidocaulon fulleri Lavranos & Mortimer
- Rhytidocaulon macrolobum Lavranos
- Rhytidocaulon mccoyi Lavranos & Mies
- Rhytidocaulon molamatarense T.A.McCoy & Plowes
- Rhytidocaulon paradoxum P.R.O.Bally - Ethiopia
- Rhytidocaulon piliferum Lavranos - Somalia
- Rhytidocaulon pseudosubscandens T.A.McCoy
- Rhytidocaulon richardianum Lavranos - Somalia
- Rhytidocaulon sheilae D.V.Field
- Rhytidocaulon specksii T.A.McCoy
- Rhytidocaulon splendidum T.A.McCoy
- Rhytidocaulon subscandens P.R.O.Bally - Somalia, Ethiopia
- Rhytidocaulon tortum (N.E.Br.) M.G.Gilbert - Arabia

Taxonomy

Phylogenetic studies have shown the genus to be monophyletic, and most closely related to the genus Echidnopsis which inhabits the same region. Marginally more distantly related is a sister branch comprising the genus Pseudolithos and the widespread Caralluma stapeliads of North Africa.
