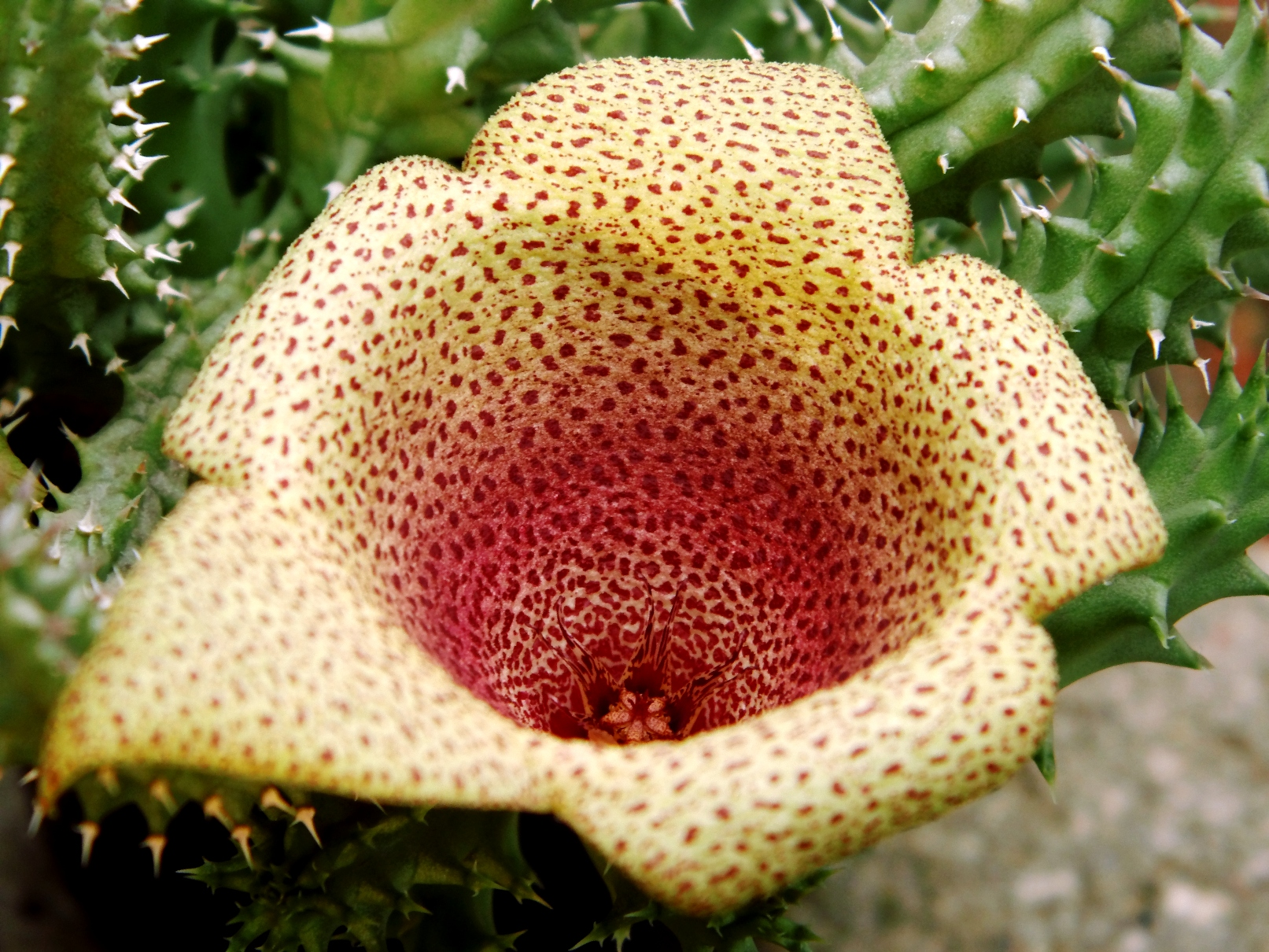
- Tavaresia meintjesii

Scientific classification
- Kingdom: Plantae
- Clade: Tracheophytes
- Clade: Angiosperms
- Clade: Eudicots
- Clade: Asterids
- Order: Gentianales
- Family: Apocynaceae
- Subfamily: Asclepiadoideae
- Tribe: Ceropegieae
- Genus: Tavaresia; Welw.

= Tavaresia =

Genus of plants

Tavaresia is a genus of plants in the family Apocynaceae, first described as a genus in 1902. It is native to southern Africa.

Species

1. Tavaresia angolensis Welw. - Angola
2. Tavaresia barklyi (Dyer) N.E.Br. - South Africa
3. Tavaresia grandiflora Berger - South Africa
4. Tavaresia meintjesii R.A. Dyer - Limpopo

formerly included

Tavaresia thompsoniorum van Jaarsv. & R.Nagel, syn of × Staparesia thompsoniorum (van Jaarsv. & R.Nagel) G.D.Rowley

Taxonomy

Phylogenetic studies have shown the genus to be most closely related to the genus Huernia, and to a widespread branch of stapeliads comprising the genera Orbea, Piaranthus and Stapelia.
