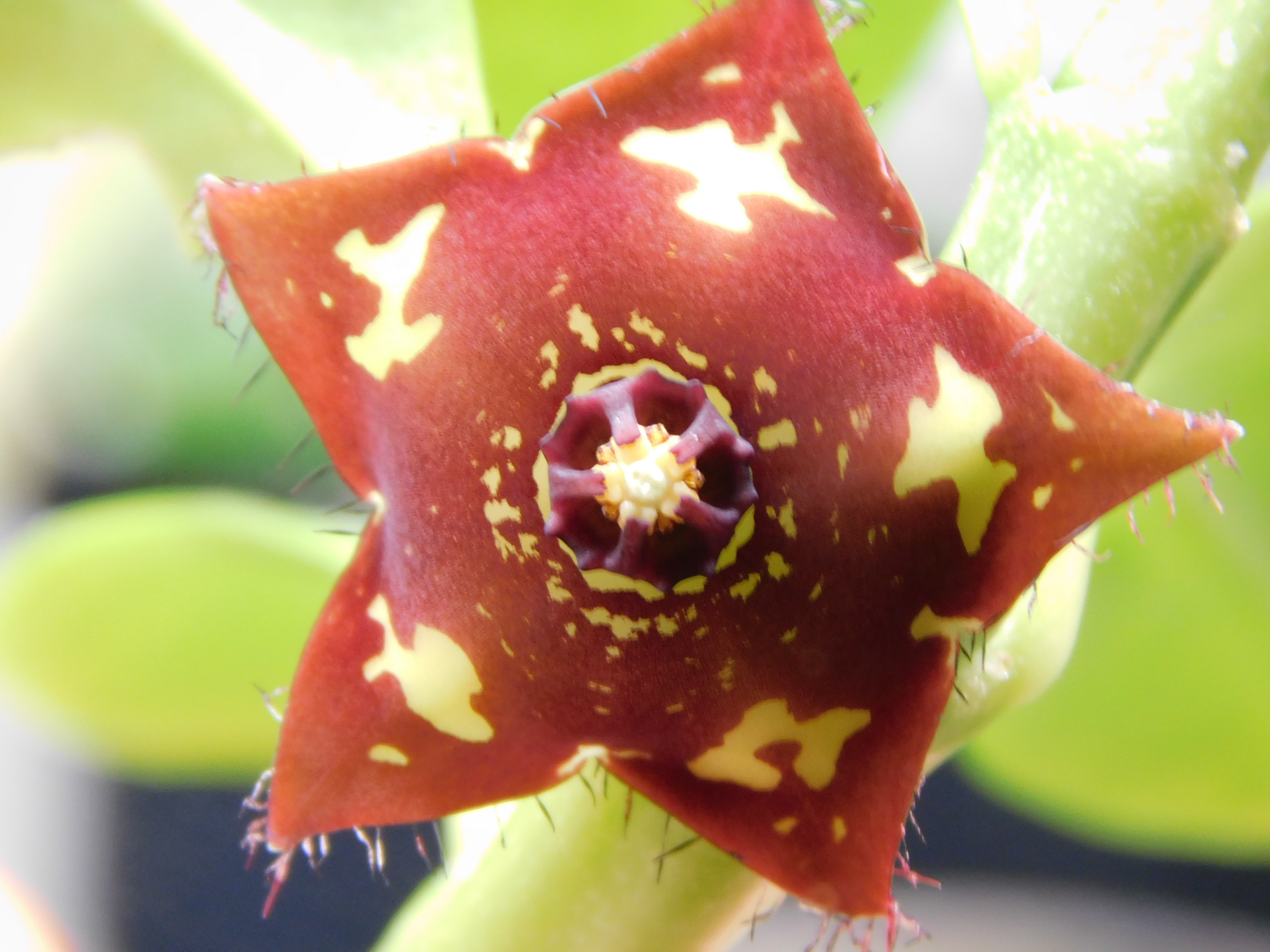

Scientific classification
- Kingdom: Plantae
- Clade: Embryophytes
- Clade: Tracheophytes
- Clade: Spermatophytes
- Clade: Angiosperms
- Clade: Eudicots
- Clade: Asterids
- Order: Gentianales
- Family: Apocynaceae
- Genus: Boucerosia
- Species: B. frerei

Binomial name
- Boucerosia frerei (G.D.Rowley) Meve & Liede

Synonyms
- Caralluma frerei G.D.Rowley; Ceropegia frerei (G.D.Rowley) Bruyns; Desmidorchis dalzellii M.R.Almeida; Frerea indica Dalzell

= Boucerosia frerei =

Plant native to Indian subcontinent

Boucerosia frerei is a plant in the genus Boucerosia which contains several species many of which are native to the Indian subcontinent and one species, Boucerosia crenulata, native to Myanmar. B. frerei has many local names, including shindel makudi, shindal makadi, makadshingi and sindhad makad - names also given to Caralluma adscendens. In Purandhar it is called potdukhi. In 2019, a new name Shiv Suman was coined by a group of botanical organisations to honour Shivaji. B. frerei is a small succulent endemic to the forest area in the Western Ghats and Deccan Plateau in Maharashtra state in India. It is also grown as a greenhouse plant by succulent plant enthusiasts. At one time, it was on the IUCN list of the twelve most endangered species on earth, but conservation efforts have brought it back from the brink of extinction.

== Description ==
Boucerosia frerei is a fleshy perennial succulent with 50 cm (20 in) long branches that have elliptic-oblong leaves that are 7 cm (2.8 in) long. The leaves grow during the monsoon season—in a habit that is unusual compared to its close relatives, it drops the leaves during dry seasons to conserve moisture. The crimson to cherry-red flowers are star shaped with yellow markings and have a 2 to 3 cm (0.79 to 1.18 in) corolla, with patterns of markings that vary from one population to another. Flowers smell of rotten meat and are lined with fine cilia. The deciduous leaves of this plant use regular C3 photosynthesis, while the stem utilizes C4 like most succulents. During dry seasons or dry spells leaves will fall off and the plant will rely on its stem for photosynthesis. The stem may take on a sliver velamin like texture It blooms from August to September.

== Taxonomy ==
The plant was described in 1865 by Nicol A. Dalzell, who dedicated the new genus Frerea, to Henry Bartle Frere, Governor of Bombay at that time. Molecular phylogenetics and morphological similarities have lumped this plant into the genus Boucerosia, though to many it is still referred to as Frerea indica.

== Distribution and habitat ==
Boucerosia frerei is known only in six areas in Maharashtra state in west India, growing at elevations between 750 and 1,347 m (2,461 and 4,419 ft), preferring crevices on cliffs. There are only a few plants in each of the six populations.

== Conservation ==
At one time Boucerosia frerei was on the IUCN list of the twelve most endangered species in the world. Propagation by government and private agencies in India have created a larger and more stable greenhouse population. A study by the Botanical Survey of India in 2010 concluded that the plant is no longer endangered—they stated in June 2010, that they would propose to the IUCN that the plant be removed from the IUCN list of endangered species. Groups that have propagated the plant in larger numbers include: the Botanical Survey of India (BSI, Pune); the Naoroji Godrej Centre for Plant Research (NGCPR, Shindewadi), Satara district, Maharashtra; the Botanic Garden of the National Botanical Research Institute (NBRI, Lucknow).

The plant's natural pollinators are believed to have all gone extinct, leaving it unable to set fruit in its native habitat. The wild population is further threatened by overgrazing, landslides, fire, and insects. There are also reports that locals eat the succulent stems. Greenhouse plants are pollinated using ants and flies, which are attracted to a foul-smelling secretion from the flower. Fruit setting and germination of seeds are now common in greenhouse conditions. The plant is also easily propagated from cuttings.

== Uses ==
Boucerosia frerei is a distinctive greenhouse plant in temperate climates, and is grown by succulent plant collectors. There are several hybrids between B. frerei and other stapeliad species. The stems and fresh shoots of B. frerei are eaten by locals. The leaves have been applied to wounds and the plant used to promote hair growth.
