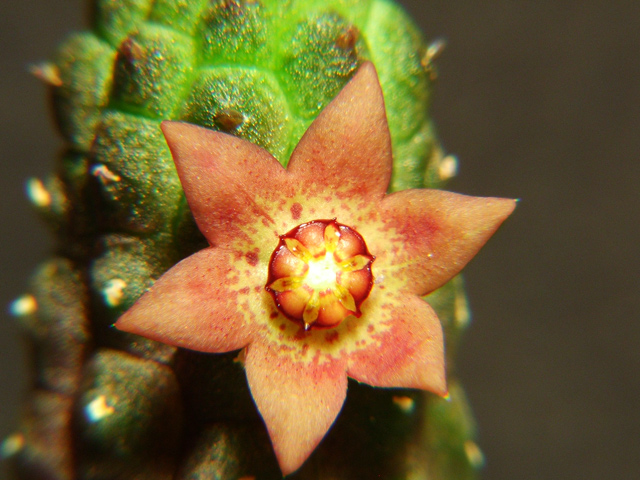

Scientific classification
- Kingdom: Plantae
- Clade: Tracheophytes
- Clade: Angiosperms
- Clade: Eudicots
- Clade: Asterids
- Order: Gentianales
- Family: Apocynaceae
- Genus: Echidnopsis
- Species: E. dammaniana

Binomial name
- Echidnopsis dammaniana Sprenger

= Echidnopsis dammaniana =

Species of plant

Echidnopsis dammaniana is a succulent species in the genus Echidnopsis. The plants have angled stems and purple flowers. It is found in Ethiopia, Kenya and Somalia and is unusual in collections.
