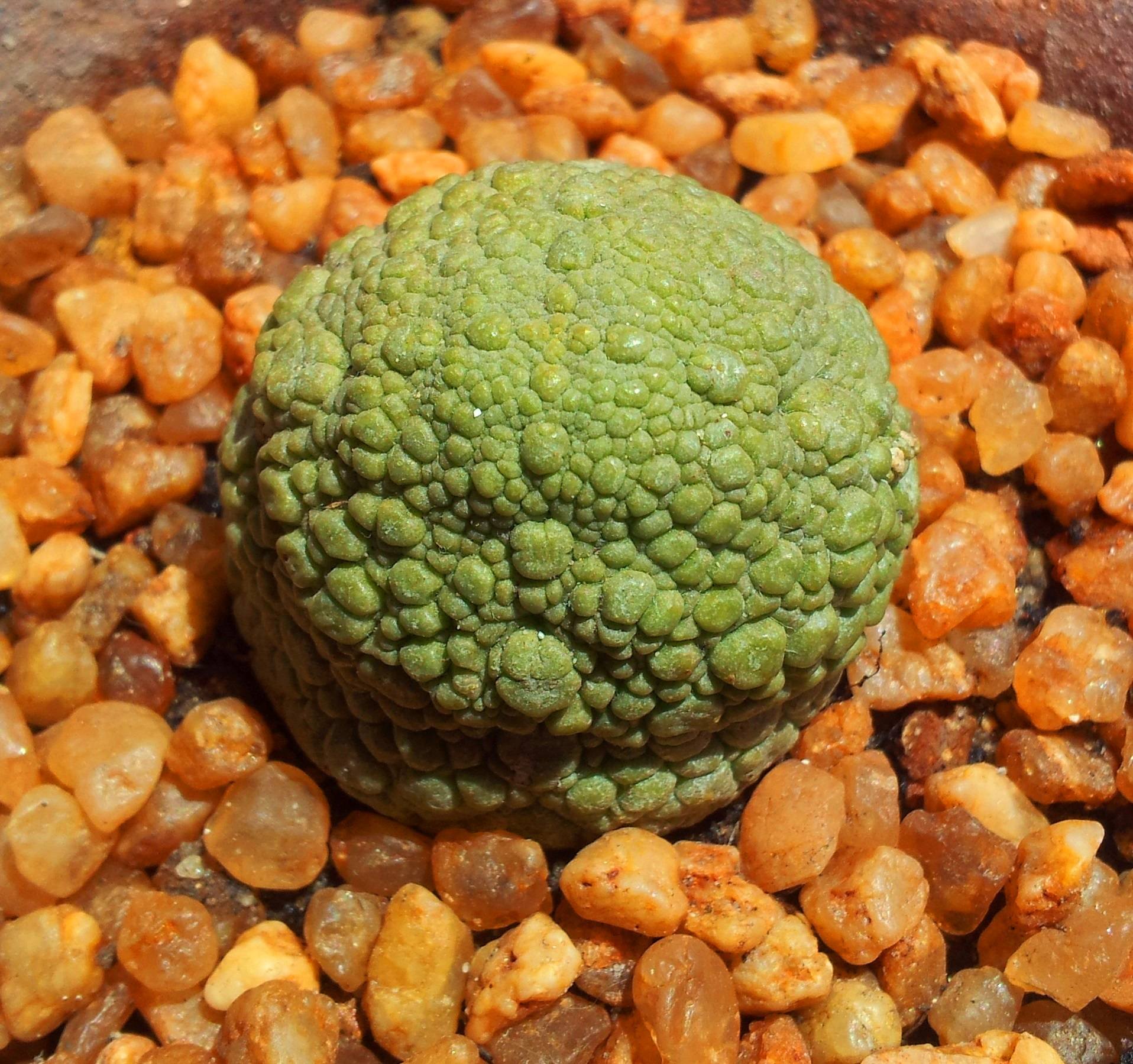
- Pseudolithos migiurtinus plant in cultivation

Scientific classification
- Kingdom: Plantae
- Clade: Embryophytes
- Clade: Tracheophytes
- Clade: Angiosperms
- Clade: Eudicots
- Clade: Asterids
- Order: Gentianales
- Family: Apocynaceae
- Subfamily: Asclepiadoideae
- Tribe: Ceropegieae
- Genus: Pseudolithos; P.R.O.Bally

= Pseudolithos =

Genus of plants

Pseudolithos is a genus of succulent flowering plants of the family Apocynaceae, indigenous to arid areas of Somalia, Yemen and Oman.

== Description and naming ==
The plants were first described as a genus in 1965; the name "Pseudo-lithos" means "false-stone" and refers to their pebble-like appearance. It was originally proposed as Lithocaulon earlier in 1956, but this name was already in use for a genus of fossil algae. All species in this genus are highly succulent, small in size, and exhibit tessellation on their stems' surface. Their small flowers appear on the spherical body's surface.

Species

picture	species	distribution
	Pseudolithos caput-viperae Lavranos	Somalia
	Pseudolithos cubiformis (P.R.O. Bally) P.R.O. Bally	N Somalia
	Pseudolithos dodsonianus (Lavranos) Bruyns & Meve	Somalia & Oman
	Pseudolithos gigas Dioli	E Ethiopia
	Pseudolithos harardheranus Dioli	Somalia
	Pseudolithos horwoodii P.R.O. Bally & Lavranos	Somalia
	Pseudolithos mccoyi Lavranos	Yemen & Oman
	Pseudolithos migiurtinus (Chiov.) P.R.O. Bally	S + C Somalia
	Pseudolithos sphaericus (P.R.O. Bally) P.R.O. Bally	N Somalia

== Taxonomy ==
Phylogenetic studies have shown the genus to be monophyletic, and most closely related to the widespread Caralluma stapeliads of North Africa. Marginally more distantly related is a sister branch comprising the genera Echidnopsis and Rhytidocaulon.
