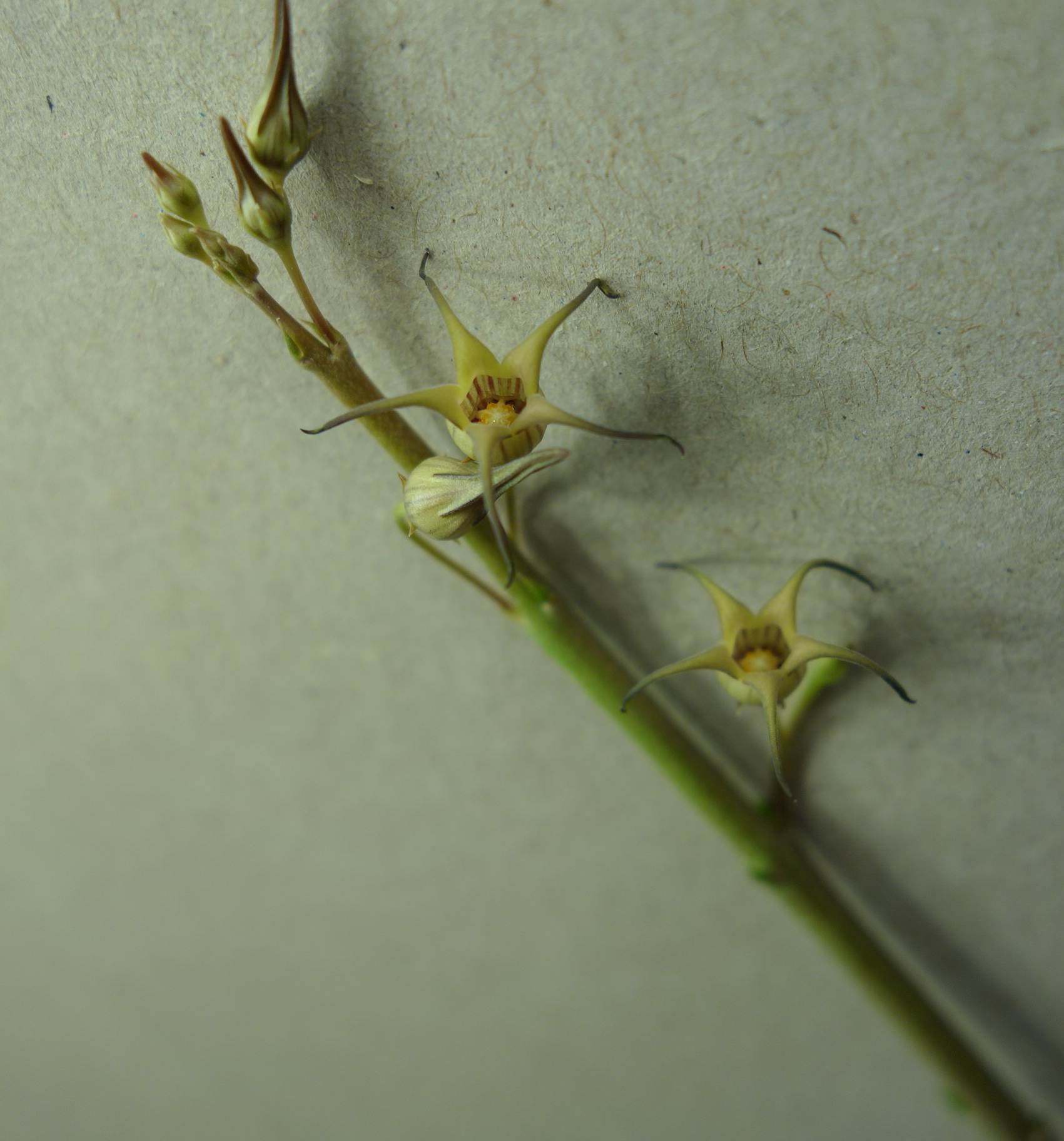
- Caudanthera edulis flowers

Scientific classification
- Kingdom: Plantae
- Clade: Tracheophytes
- Clade: Angiosperms
- Clade: Eudicots
- Clade: Asterids
- Order: Gentianales
- Family: Apocynaceae
- Genus: Caudanthera
- Species: C. edulis

Binomial name
- Caudanthera edulis (Edgew.) Meve & Liede

Synonyms
- Boucerosia edulis Edgew.; Caralluma edulis (Edgew.) Benth. ex Hook.f.; Desmidorchis stocksiana Kuntze; Cryptolluma edulis (Edgew.) Plowes

= Caudanthera edulis =

Species of plant

Caudanthera edulis is a succulent subshrub flowering plant that belongs to the genus Caudanthera in the subfamily Asclepiadoideae of the family Apocynaceae. This species is native to Niger, northeast Tropical Africa, the Arabian Peninsula, through Iran, Afghanistan and Pakistan to northwest India and is found in desert and dry shrubland.

Common names include situn in Pakistan, doghabis and howraghu in the Hormozgan province of Iran and pimpa in the Thar Desert of northeast India.

== Uses ==
The name Boucerosia edulis (the basionym of the current name) was given in 1862 by the Irish botanist Michael Edgeworth. The specific name edulis means edible in Latin. Edgeworth had specimens from Sindh and Multan in present-day Pakistan. He stated, in Latin, "edible, subacid, grows wild among Salvadora trees, there it is harvested to be sold in markets under the name Situn."

The plant is also eaten in Iran and the Thar Desert of northeast India.
