= Monolluma quadrangula =

Scientific classification
- Kingdom: Plantae
- Clade: Tracheophytes
- Clade: Angiosperms
- Clade: Eudicots
- Clade: Asterids
- Order: Gentianales
- Family: Apocynaceae
- Genus: Monolluma
- Species: M. quadrangula

Binomial name
- Monolluma quadrangula (Forssk.) Plowes

Synonyms
- Boucerosia forskalii Decne., nom. illeg.; Boucerosia quadrangula (Forssk.) Decne.; Caralluma forsskalii Plowsen, nom. superfl.; Caralluma quadrangula (Forssk.) N.E.Br.; Ceropegia quadrangula (Forssk.) Bruyns; Desmidorchis forsskalii Decne., nom. illeg.; Desmidorchis quadrangula (Forssk.) Kuntze; Echidnopsis quadrangula (Forssk.) Deflers; Stapelia quadrangula Forssk.

Species of plant

Monolluma quadrangula is a species of flowering plant in the family Apocynaceae, native to the Arabian Peninsula (Oman, Saudi Arabia and Yemen). It was first described by Peter Forsskål in 1775 as Stapelia quadrangula.
