= Pseudolithos horwoodii =

Scientific classification
- Kingdom: Plantae
- Clade: Tracheophytes
- Clade: Angiosperms
- Clade: Eudicots
- Clade: Asterids
- Order: Gentianales
- Family: Apocynaceae
- Genus: Pseudolithos
- Species: P. horwoodii

Binomial name
- Pseudolithos horwoodii P.R.O.Bally & Lavranos

Species of plant

Pseudolithos horwoodii is a species of succulent plant in the genus Pseudolithos. Native to arid areas of Somalia, it is a small, leafless plant up to 80 millimetres (3.1 in) tall and 45–60 millimetres (1.8–2.4 in) wide. Its growth habit is squat, unbranched, and blob-like, living up to the name of its genus which means "false stone". Its color is green to grayish brown.
