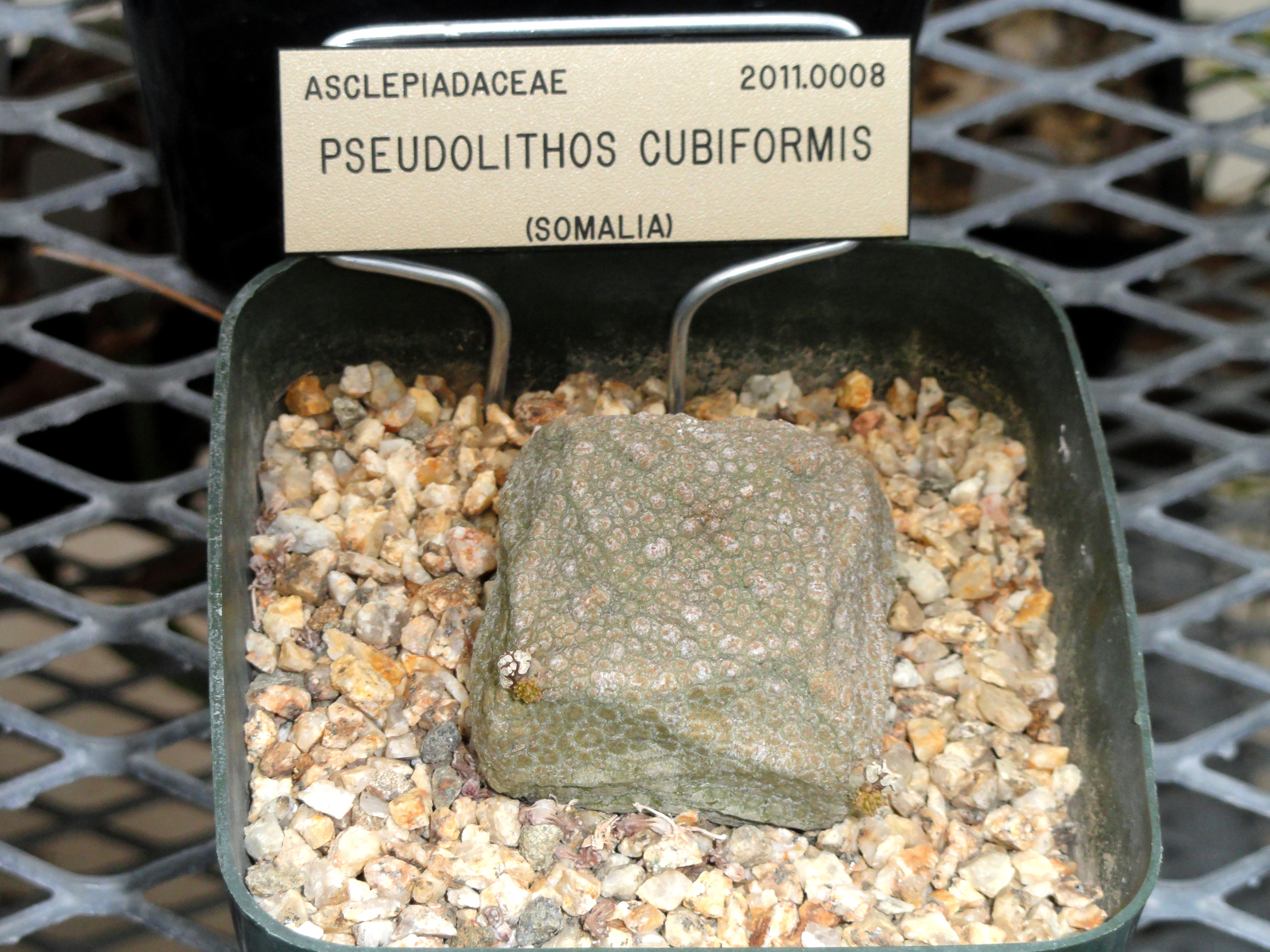

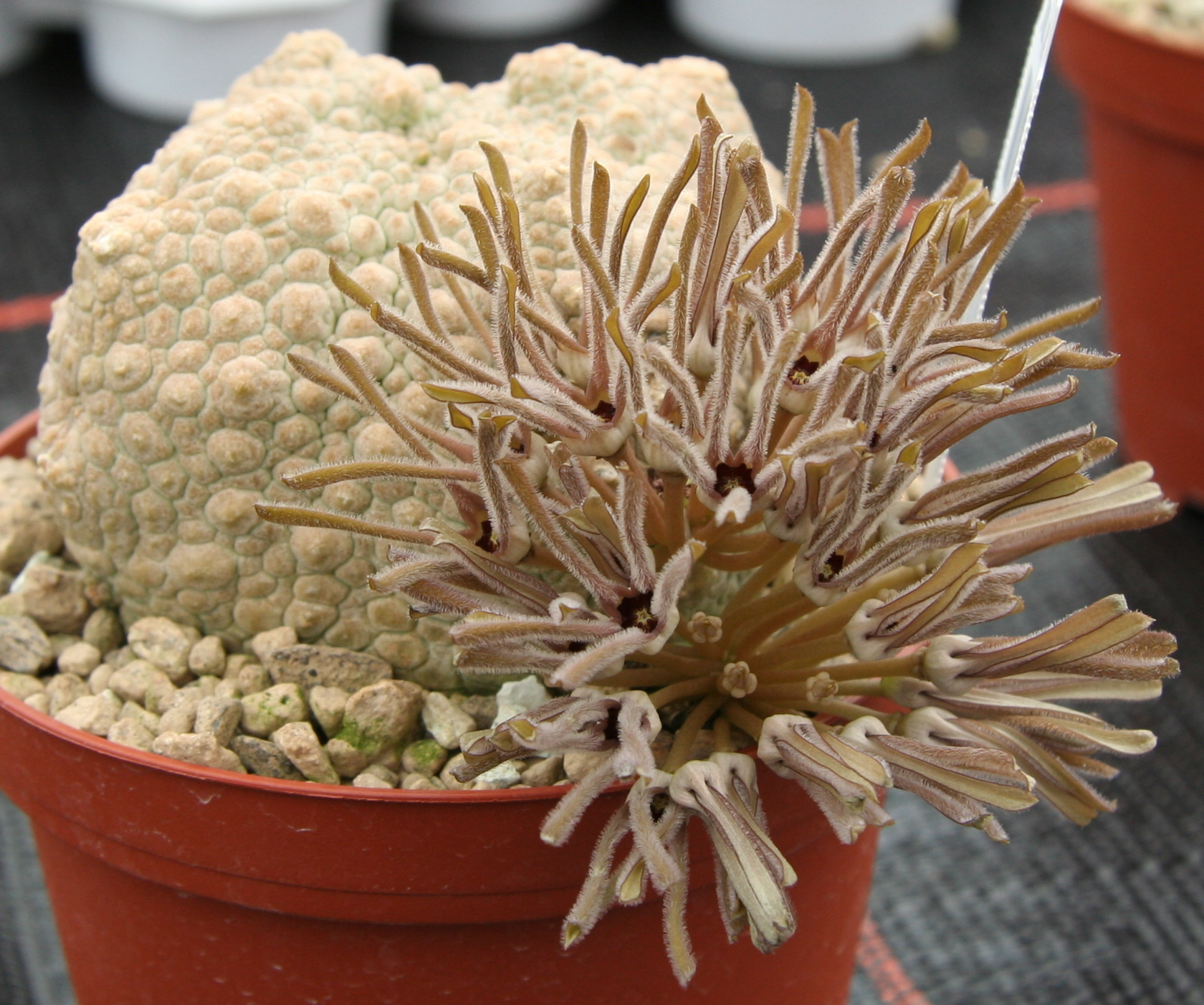

Scientific classification
- Kingdom: Plantae
- Clade: Embryophytes
- Clade: Tracheophytes
- Clade: Angiosperms
- Clade: Eudicots
- Clade: Asterids
- Order: Gentianales
- Family: Apocynaceae
- Genus: Pseudolithos
- Species: P. cubiformis

Binomial name
- Pseudolithos cubiformis (P.R.O.Bally) P.R.O.Bally

= Pseudolithos cubiformis =

Species of plant

Pseudolithos cubiformis is a species of succulent plant native to Somalia. While its genus name, Pseudolithos, refers to its stone-like appearance, the species is especially named for its squat, leafless, and often cube-shaped growth habit.
