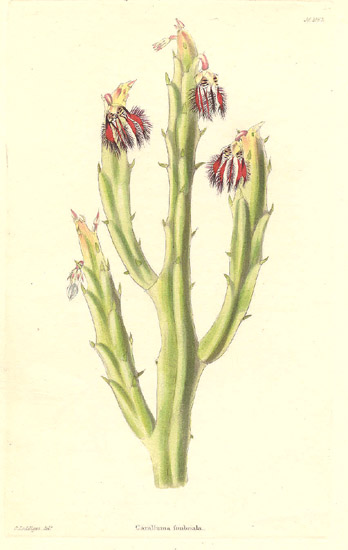
- 1832 botanical illustration of C. fimbriata, a synonym of Caralluma adscendens

Scientific classification
- Kingdom: Plantae
- Clade: Tracheophytes
- Clade: Angiosperms
- Clade: Eudicots
- Clade: Asterids
- Order: Gentianales
- Family: Apocynaceae
- Genus: Caralluma
- Species: C. adscendens

Binomial name
- Caralluma adscendens (Roxb.) Haw.

Synonyms
- Boucerosia adscendens (Roxb.) Wall.; Caralluma attenuata Wight; Caralluma fimbriata Wall.

= Caralluma adscendens =

Species of plant

Caralluma adscendens is a succulent plant in the family Apocynaceae. Its distribution ranges from India and Sri Lanka through the Arabian peninsula to North Africa and the Sahel.

== In home gardens ==
Caralluma adscendens Some people in Pakistan have started to grow it in earthen plastic Containers and are producing fresh vegetables for their consumption.

== Use ==
Caralluma adscendens (Chong) has been eaten in rural India for centuries, raw, as a vegetable with spices, or preserved in chutneys and pickles, and is often found as a roadside shrub or boundary marker.

== Consumer issues ==
Various diet pills claiming to contain Caralluma fimbriata extracts are marketed for weight loss. A study published in 2015 showed the supplement to be well tolerated, but to have no clinical effect compared to a placebo at the supposedly therapeutic dose of 1g daily.

== Chemistry ==
The key phytochemical constituents of the herb are pregnane glycosides, flavone glycosides, megastigmane glycosides, and saponins.
