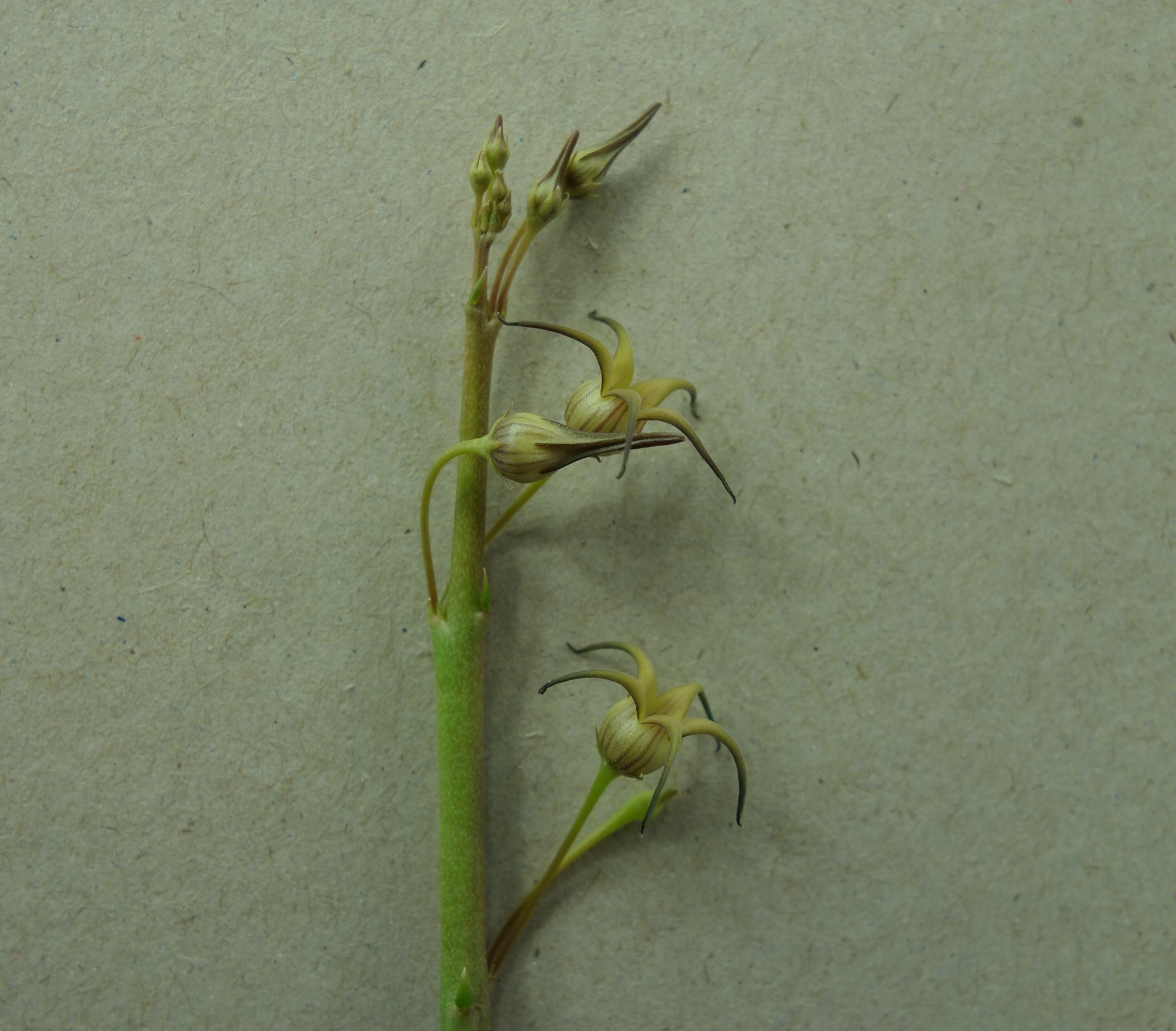
- Caudanthera edulis

Scientific classification
- Kingdom: Plantae
- Clade: Tracheophytes
- Clade: Angiosperms
- Clade: Eudicots
- Clade: Asterids
- Order: Gentianales
- Family: Apocynaceae
- Subfamily: Asclepiadoideae
- Tribe: Ceropegieae
- Genus: Caudanthera; Plowes

= Caudanthera =

Genus of flowering plants

Caudanthera is a genus of flowering plants belonging to the family Apocynaceae.

Its native range is Niger to Israel and Northwestern India.

Species:

- Caudanthera baradii (Lavranos & L.E.Newton) Plowes
- Caudanthera edulis (Edgew.) Meve & Liede
- Caudanthera mireillae (Lavranos) Plowes
- Caudanthera sinaica (Decne.) Plowes
