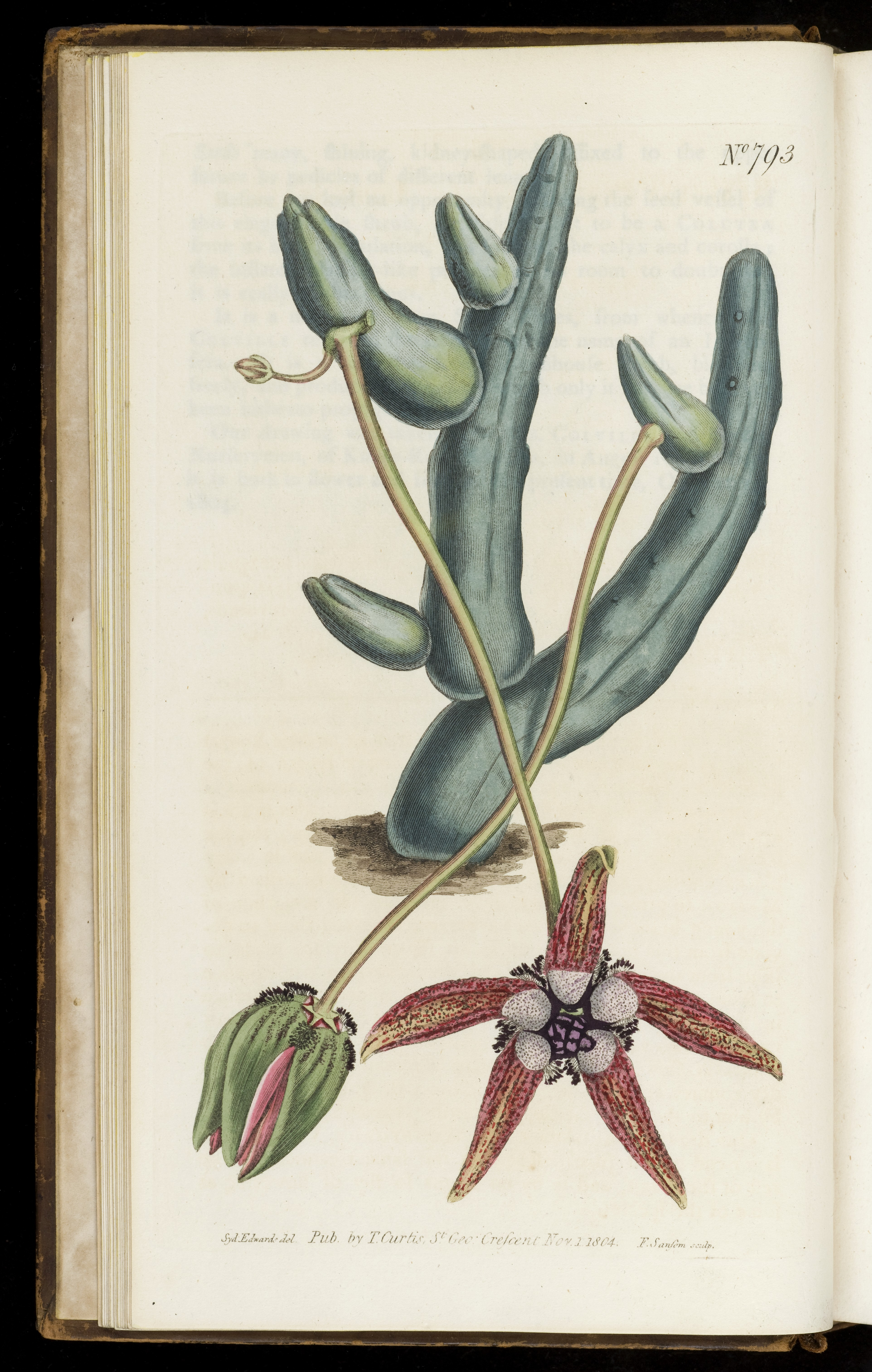
- Tromotriche pedunculata. Botanical illustration

Scientific classification
- Kingdom: Plantae
- Clade: Tracheophytes
- Clade: Angiosperms
- Clade: Eudicots
- Clade: Asterids
- Order: Gentianales
- Family: Apocynaceae
- Subfamily: Asclepiadoideae
- Tribe: Ceropegieae
- Genus: Tromotriche; Haw.

= Tromotriche =

Genus of plants

Tromotriche is a genus of plant in family Apocynaceae. It is native to southern Africa.

== Description ==
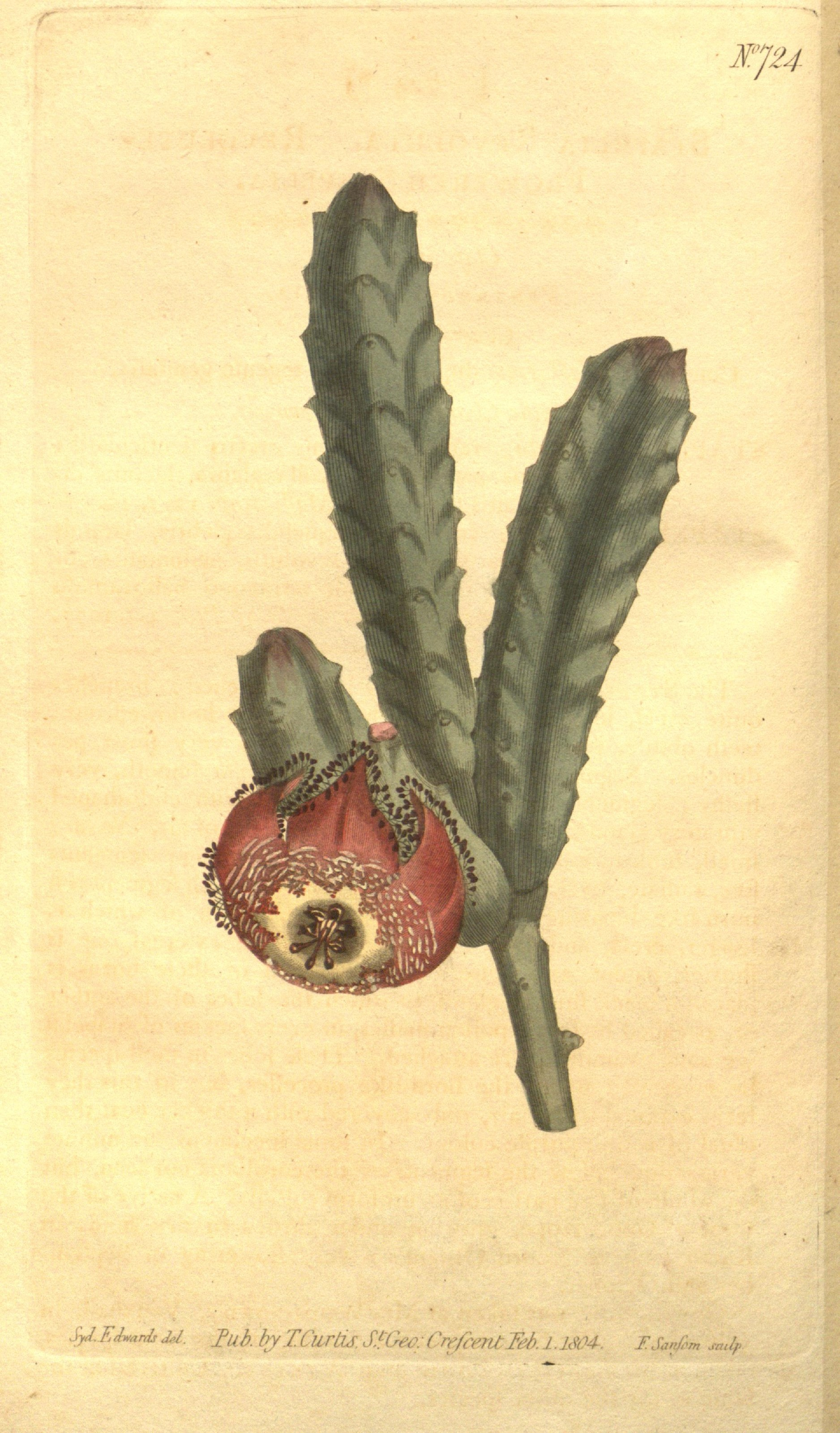
Botanical illustration of Tromotriche revoluta

Tromotriche was first described as a genus in 1812, and its Greek name refers to the quivering hairs that surround the lobes of its flowers ("tromo-" = "trembling"; "-trichos" = "hair").

The soft stems of Tromotriche species are obtusely, roundly four-angled (in cross section). Low, rounded mounds run along the edges of the angles, and leaf remnants are not visible. The stem surface is soft but often slightly rough.

The varied flowers appear along the stems, and often have the characteristic hairs on the outsides of the lobes.

== Distribution ==
This genus is restricted to the western (winter rainfall) regions of South Africa & Namibia. Its natural range closely mirrors that of the related genus Quaqua. The Tromotriche species in the north of its range tend to inhabit rocky quartz flats; while the three species in the south are each restricted to a small spot within the sandstone Cape Fold mountain ranges.

Species

1. Tromotriche baylissii (L.C. Leach) Bruyns
2. Tromotriche choanantha (Lavranos & Harry Hall) Bruyns
3. Tromotriche engleriana (Schltr.) L.C. Leach
4. Tromotriche herrei (Nel) Bruyns
5. Tromotriche longii (C.A. Lückh.) Bruyns
6. Tromotriche longipes (C.A. Lückh.) Bruyns
7. Tromotriche revoluta (L.) Haw.
8. Tromotriche ruschiana (Dinter) Bruyns
9. Tromotriche thudichumii (Pillans) L.C. Leach
10. Tromotriche umdausensis (Nel) Bruyns

formerly included

Tromotriche obliqua (Willd.) G. Don in Loudon, synonym of Stisseria obliqua (Willd.) Kuntze
