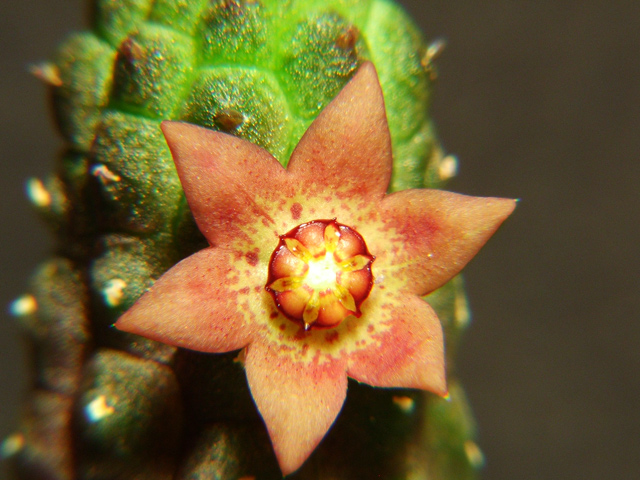
- Echidnopsis dammaniana

Scientific classification
- Kingdom: Plantae
- Clade: Tracheophytes
- Clade: Angiosperms
- Clade: Eudicots
- Clade: Asterids
- Order: Gentianales
- Family: Apocynaceae
- Subfamily: Asclepiadoideae
- Tribe: Ceropegieae
- Genus: Echidnopsis; Hook.f.

Type species
- Echidnopsis cereiformis Hook.f.

= Echidnopsis =

Genus of flowering plants

Echidnopsis is a genus of succulent, cactus-like plants in the family Apocynaceae, first described as a genus in 1871. They are native to eastern Africa and the Arabian Peninsula.

Accepted species

1. Echidnopsis angustiloba E.A.Bruce & P.R.O.Bally - Kenya
2. Echidnopsis archeri P.R.O.Bally - Kenya
3. Echidnopsis ballyi (Marn.-Lap.) P.R.O.Bally - N Somalia
4. Echidnopsis bentii N.E.Br. ex Hook.f. - Arabia
5. Echidnopsis bihenduhensis P.R.O.Bally - N Somalia
6. Echidnopsis cereiformis Hook.f. - South Africa
7. Echidnopsis chrysantha Lavranos - Somalia
8. Echidnopsis ciliata P.R.O.Bally - N Somalia
9. Echidnopsis dammaniana Sprenger - Eritrea
10. Echidnopsis ericiflora Lavranos - Kenya
11. Echidnopsis globosa Thulin & Hjertson - Yemen
12. Echidnopsis inconspicua Bruyns
13. Echidnopsis insularis Lavranos - Socotra
14. Echidnopsis leachii Lavranos
15. Echidnopsis malum (Lavranos) Bruyns - Somalia
16. Echidnopsis mijerteina Lavranos - Somalia
17. Echidnopsis milleri Lavranos - Socotra
18. Echidnopsis montana (R.A.Dyer & E.A.Bruce) P.R.O.Bally - Ethiopia
19. Echidnopsis multangula (Forssk.) Chiov. - Arabia
20. Echidnopsis planiflora P.R.O.Bally - Somalia, Ethiopia
21. Echidnopsis radians Bellerue-Bleck - Kenya
22. Echidnopsis repens R.A.Dyer & Verdoorn - Tanzania
23. Echidnopsis rubrolutea Plowes - Somalia
24. Echidnopsis scutellata (Deflers) A.Berger - Arabia, Kenya
25. Echidnopsis seibanica Lavranos - Arabia
26. Echidnopsis sharpei A.C.White & B.Sloane - Kenya, Somalia
27. Echidnopsis similis Plowes - Somalia
28. Echidnopsis socotrana Lavranos - Socotra
29. Echidnopsis squamulata (Decne.) P.R.O.Bally - Arabia
30. Echidnopsis uraiqatiana Dioli - Eritrea
31. Echidnopsis urceolata P.R.O.Bally - Kenya
32. Echidnopsis virchowii K.Schum. - Somalia, Kenya, Tanzania
33. Echidnopsis watsonii P.R.O.Bally - Somalia
34. Echidnopsis yemenensis Plowes - Yemen

Species formerly included

Echidnopsis quadrangula now Caralluma quadrangula

Taxonomy

Phylogenetic studies have shown the genus to be monophyletic, and most closely related to the genus Rhytidocaulon. Marginally more distantly related is a sister branch comprising the genus Pseudolithos and the widespread Caralluma stapeliads of North Africa.
