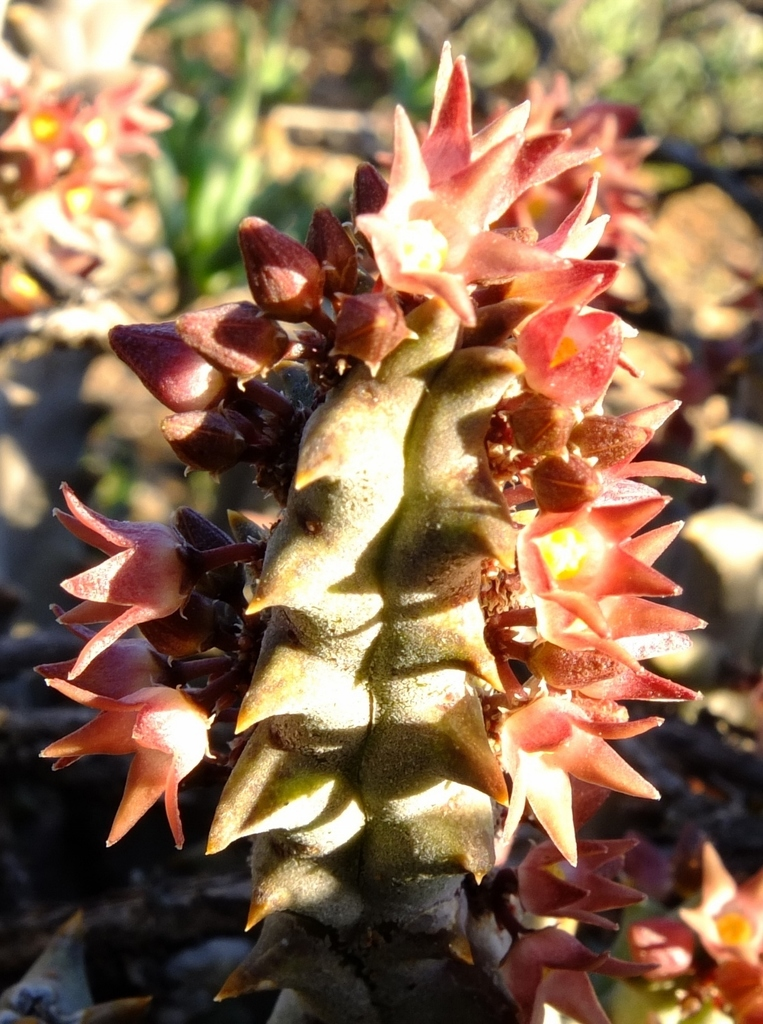

Conservation status
- Least Concern (SANBI Red List)

Scientific classification
- Kingdom: Plantae
- Clade: Tracheophytes
- Clade: Angiosperms
- Clade: Eudicots
- Clade: Asterids
- Order: Gentianales
- Family: Apocynaceae
- Genus: Quaqua
- Species: Q. incarnata

Binomial name
- Quaqua incarnata (L.f.) Bruyns

Synonyms
- Boucerosia incarnata (L.f.) N.E.Br.; Caralluma incarnata (L.f.) N.E.Br.; Ceropegia incarnata (L.f.) Bruyns; Piaranthus incarnatus (L.f.) G.Don; Podanthes incarnata (L.f.) Sweet; Stapelia incarnata L.f.

= Quaqua incarnata =

Succulent endemic to the Namaqualand

Quaqua incarnata is a species of succulent plant in the genus Quaqua. It is endemic to southwestern Namibia and to the Namaqualand region in the western Cape Provinces of South Africa.

== Conservation status ==
Quaqua incarnata is classified as Least Concern as the population is stable.
