= Australluma =

Scientific classification
- Kingdom: Plantae
- Clade: Tracheophytes
- Clade: Angiosperms
- Clade: Eudicots
- Clade: Asterids
- Order: Gentianales
- Family: Apocynaceae
- Subfamily: Asclepiadoideae
- Tribe: Ceropegieae
- Genus: Australluma; Plowes

Genus of plants

Australluma is a genus of plant in family Apocynaceae.

Species accepted by the Plants of the World Online as of February 2023:

- Australluma peschii (Nel) Plowes
- Australluma ubomboensis (I.Verd.) Bruyns
