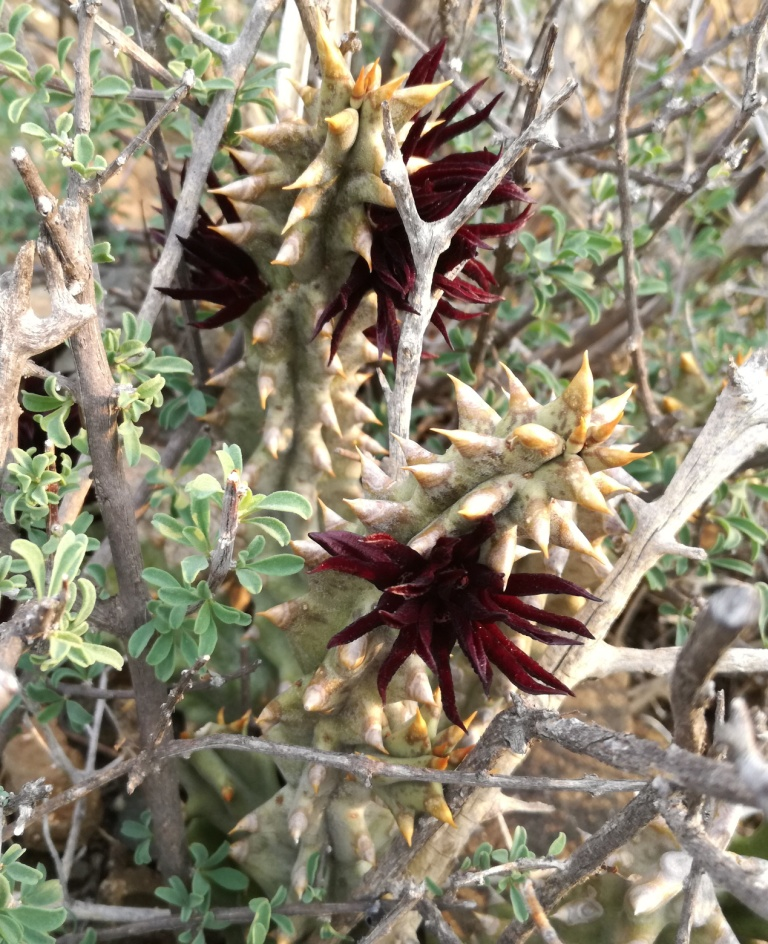
- Quaqua mammillaris (the "aroena"), a widespread and common species from the south-western Cape.

Scientific classification
- Kingdom: Plantae
- Clade: Tracheophytes
- Clade: Angiosperms
- Clade: Eudicots
- Clade: Asterids
- Order: Gentianales
- Family: Apocynaceae
- Subfamily: Asclepiadoideae
- Tribe: Ceropegieae
- Genus: Quaqua; N.E.Br.

Synonyms
- Sarcophagophilus Dinter

= Quaqua =

Genus of plants

Quaqua is a genus of stem succulents within the tribe of plants known collectively as stapeliads. All stapeliads, including Quaqua, are Old World plants.

Species of the genus Quaqua are exceptionally varied and endemic to southwestern Africa, and locally very common in Namaqualand.

The name of the genus was taken from the Khoisan name 'Qua-qua' for the first plant described in the genus by N. E. Brown in 1879. That plant is now regarded as a subspecies of Quaqua incarnata.

== Description ==
Species of Quaqua are usually characterised by having stout, firm, 4 or 5-sided stems bearing conical tubercles which often have a tough, tapering spike at their ends. A few species lack the spikes or have smoothly rounded tubercles.

Quaqua flowers are distinctive from those of other southern African stapeliads for their numerous inflorescences emerging from each stem, especially closer to the ends. There are often ten along each stem, vertically arranged in distichous series. The flowers of some species are sweet smelling (faintly of honey or lemon), attractive and rather small (between 7 and 15 mm in diameter). The flowers of other species however, are larger, reaching a maximum diameter of 27 mm and are dark, papillate, and usually have a repulsive odor of urine or excrement. These species are pollinated by flies.

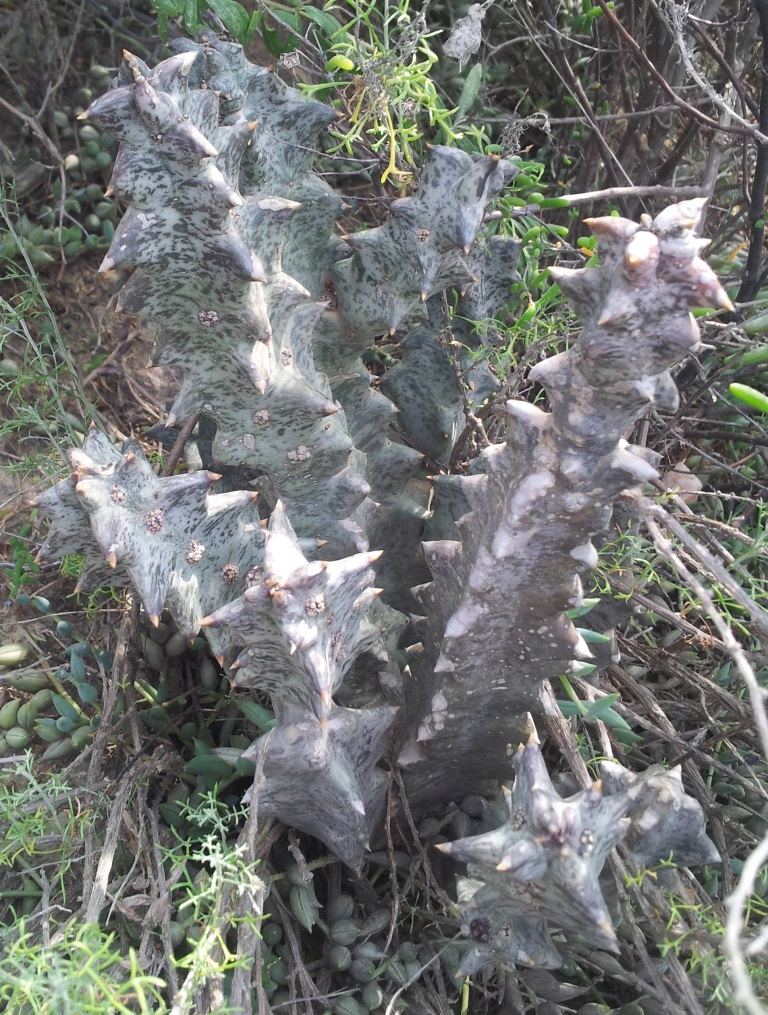
Quaqua pillansii, from the Little Karoo, has smooth, erect grey stems

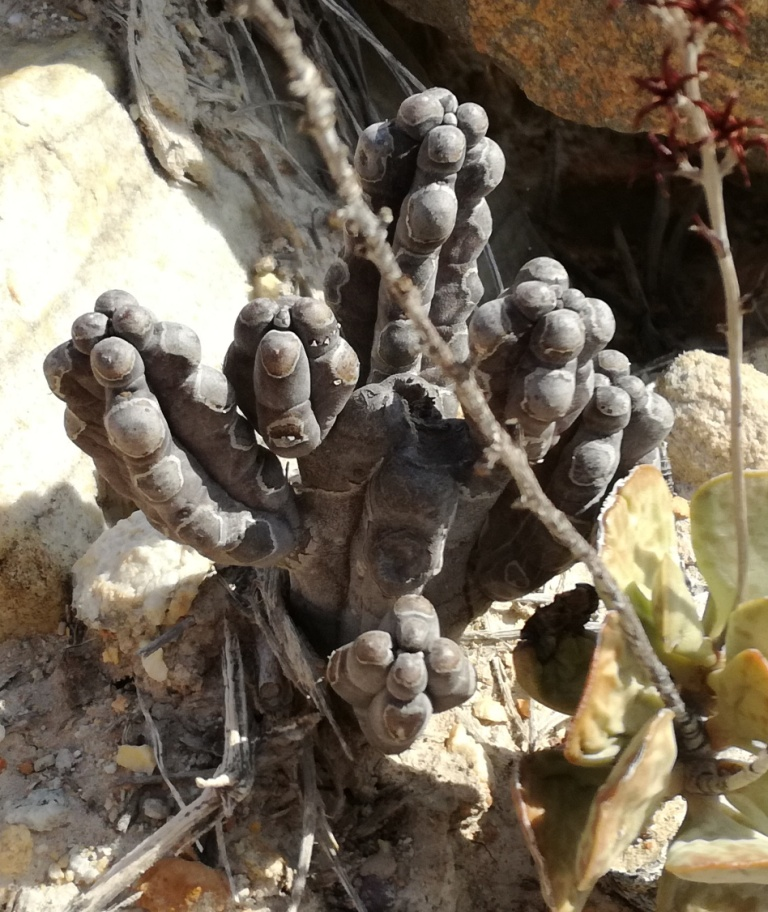
Quaqua ramosa, from the western Karoo, locally called "Ou Ram" ("old ram"), is unusual in having rounded tubercles instead of the typical quaqua spikes

== Distribution ==
In distribution, the genus Quaqua is restricted to the western (winter-rainfall) region of South Africa & Namibia. Its distribution closely mirrors that of related genus Tromotriche.

== Species ==
As of February 2026, the following 20 species are accepted according to Plants of the World Online:

| Image | Scientific name | Distribution |
|---|---|---|
| | Quaqua acutiloba (N.E.Br.) Bruyns | South Africa and Namibia. |
| | Quaqua albersii Plowes | South Africa (Vredendal) |
| | Quaqua arenicola (N.E.Br.) Plowes | South Africa (Cape Province) |
| | Quaqua arida (Masson) Plowes | South Africa (Cape Province) |
| | Quaqua armata (N.E.Br.) Bruyns | South Africa (Cape Province) |
| | Quaqua aurea (C.A.Lückh.) Plowes | South Africa (Cape Province) |
| | Quaqua bayeriana (Bruyns) Plowes | South Africa (Cape Province) |
| | Quaqua cincta (C.A.Lückh.) Bruyns | South Africa (Cape Province) |
| | Quaqua framesii (Pillans) Bruyns | South Africa (Cape Province) |
| | Quaqua incarnata (L.f.) Bruyns | South Africa and Namibia. |
| | Quaqua inversa (N.E.Br.) Bruyns | South Africa (Cape Province) |
| | Quaqua linearis (N.E.Br.) Bruyns | South Africa (Cape Province) |
| | Quaqua mammillaris (L.) Bruyns | South Africa and Namibia. |
| | Quaqua multiflora (R.A.Dyer) Bruyns | South Africa (Cape Province) |
| | Quaqua pallens Bruyns | South Africa (Cape Province) |
| | Quaqua parviflora (Masson) Bruyns | South Africa (Cape Province) |
| | Quaqua pillansii (N.E.Br.) Bruyns | South Africa (Cape Province) |
| | Quaqua pruinosa (Masson) Bruyns | South Africa (Cape Province) |
| | Quaqua pulchra (Bruyns) Plowes | South Africa (Cape Province) |
| | Quaqua ramosa (Masson) Bruyns | South Africa (Cape Province) |

The species of this genus can be divided into two main groups, based on their floral structure: One group bears flowers singly or in pairs; the other bears flowers in clusters of between 4 and 20. The species of the second grouping can in turn be divided into two sections: One with purple to dark-brown flowers that are wider than 25mm (e.g. Quaqua mammillaris or Quaqua pillansii); the other with yellow to cream flowers that are narrower than 25mm.
