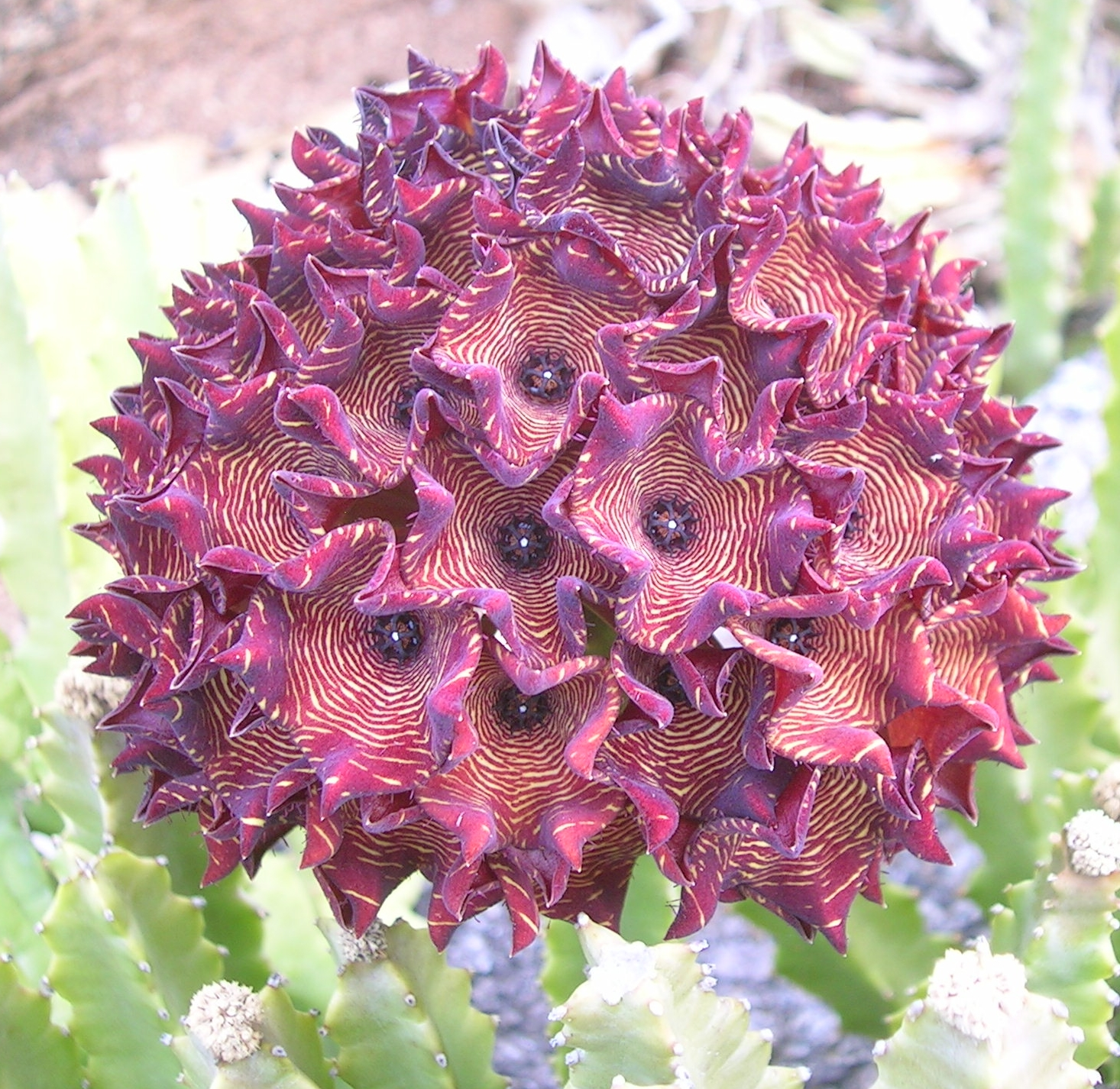
- Boucerosia diffusa, India

Scientific classification
- Kingdom: Plantae
- Clade: Tracheophytes
- Clade: Angiosperms
- Clade: Eudicots
- Clade: Asterids
- Order: Gentianales
- Family: Apocynaceae
- Subfamily: Asclepiadoideae
- Tribe: Ceropegieae
- Genus: Boucerosia; Wight & Arn.

Synonyms
- Frerea Dalzell; Hutchinia Wight & Arn.; Pendulluma Plowes

= Boucerosia =

Genus of flowering plants

Boucerosia is a genus of flowering plants belonging to the family Apocynaceae. Its native range is Bangladesh, India, Myanmar and Sri Lanka.

== Species ==
Species accepted by Plants of the World Online as of January 2026.

- Boucerosia crenulata (Wall.) Wight & Arn.
- Boucerosia diffusa Wight
- Boucerosia frerei (G.D.Rowley) Meve & Liede
- Boucerosia indica (Wight & Arn.) Plowes
- Boucerosia pauciflora Wight
- Boucerosia penduliflora Frandsen & Aditya
- Boucerosia procumbens (Gravely & Mayur.) Plowes
- Boucerosia umbellata (Haw.) Wight & Arn.
