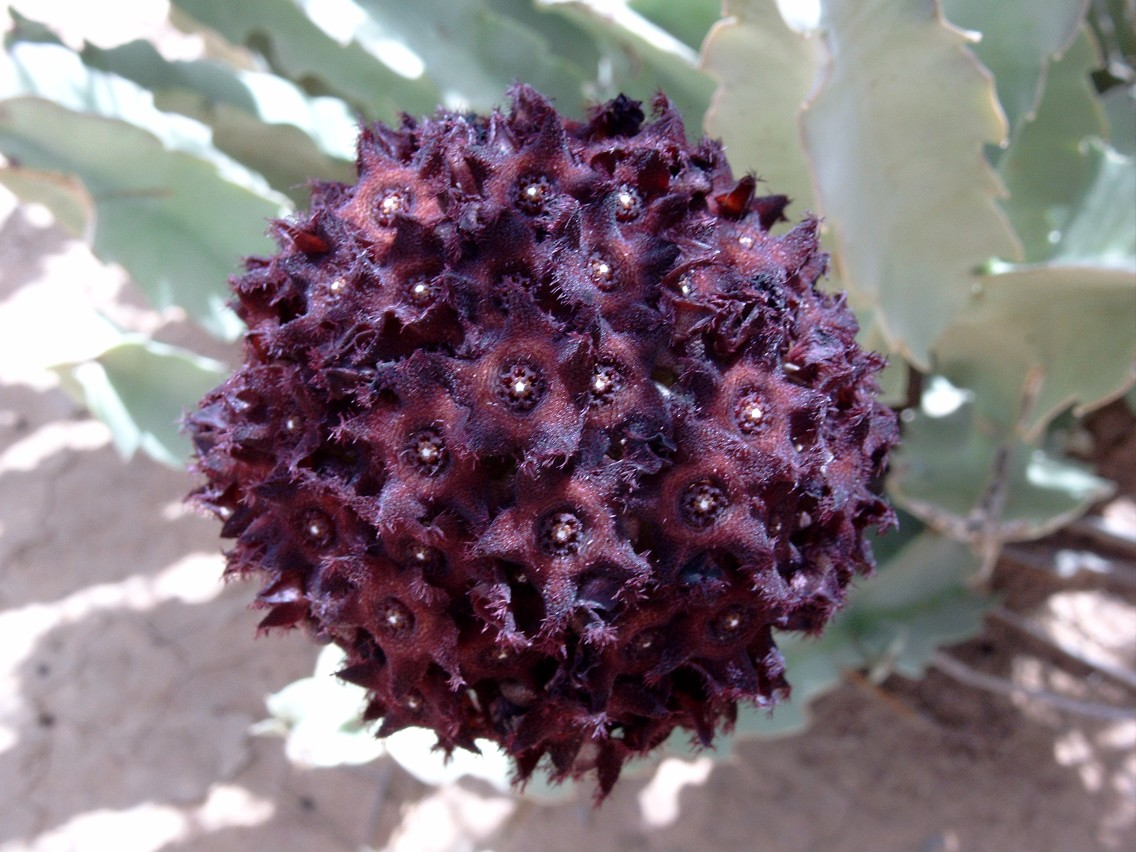
- Desmidorchis retrospiciens, Burkina Faso

Scientific classification
- Kingdom: Plantae
- Clade: Tracheophytes
- Clade: Angiosperms
- Clade: Eudicots
- Clade: Asterids
- Order: Gentianales
- Family: Apocynaceae
- Subfamily: Asclepiadoideae
- Tribe: Ceropegieae
- Genus: Desmidorchis; Ehrenb.

= Desmidorchis =

Genus of plants

Desmidorchis is a genus of flowering plants belonging to the family Apocynaceae.

Its native range is the Sahara and Sahel, from Senegal in the west to Egypt’s eastern coast; south through the Horn of Africa to Kenya and Tanzania; coastal southwestern Saudi Arabia (from south of Jeddah), as well as coastal regions of Oman, the United Arab Emirates and Yemen. Additionally, some species are restricted to certain areas including Namibia, South Africa and Zimbabwe.

== Species ==
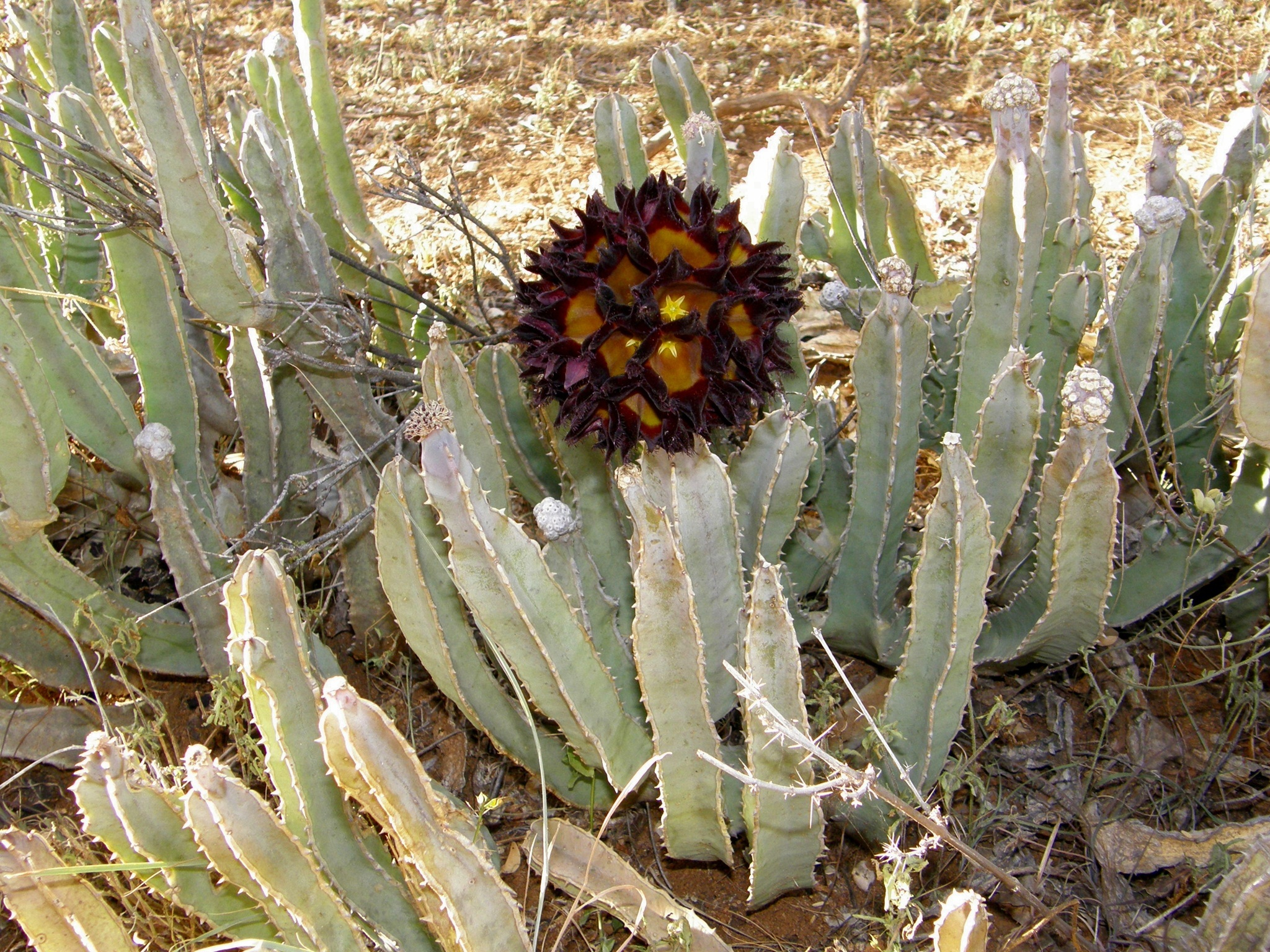
Desmidorchis speciosa, Ethiopia

Accepted species as of January 2026.

- Desmidorchis adenensis (Deflers) Meve & Liede
- Desmidorchis arabica (N.E.Br.) Meve & Liede
- Desmidorchis aucheriana (Decne.) Kuntze
- Desmidorchis awdeliana (Deflers) Meve & Liede
- Desmidorchis edithiae (N.E.Br.) Plowes
- Desmidorchis flava (N.E.Br.) Meve & Liede
- Desmidorchis foetida (E.A.Bruce) Plowes
- Desmidorchis impostor Jonkers
- Desmidorchis lavrani (Rauh & Wertel) Meve & Liede
- Desmidorchis penicillata (Deflers) Plowes
- Desmidorchis retrospiciens Ehrenb.
- Desmidorchis somalica (N.E.Br.) Plowes
- Desmidorchis speciosa (N.E.Br.) Plowes
- Desmidorchis tardellii Mosti & Raffaelli
