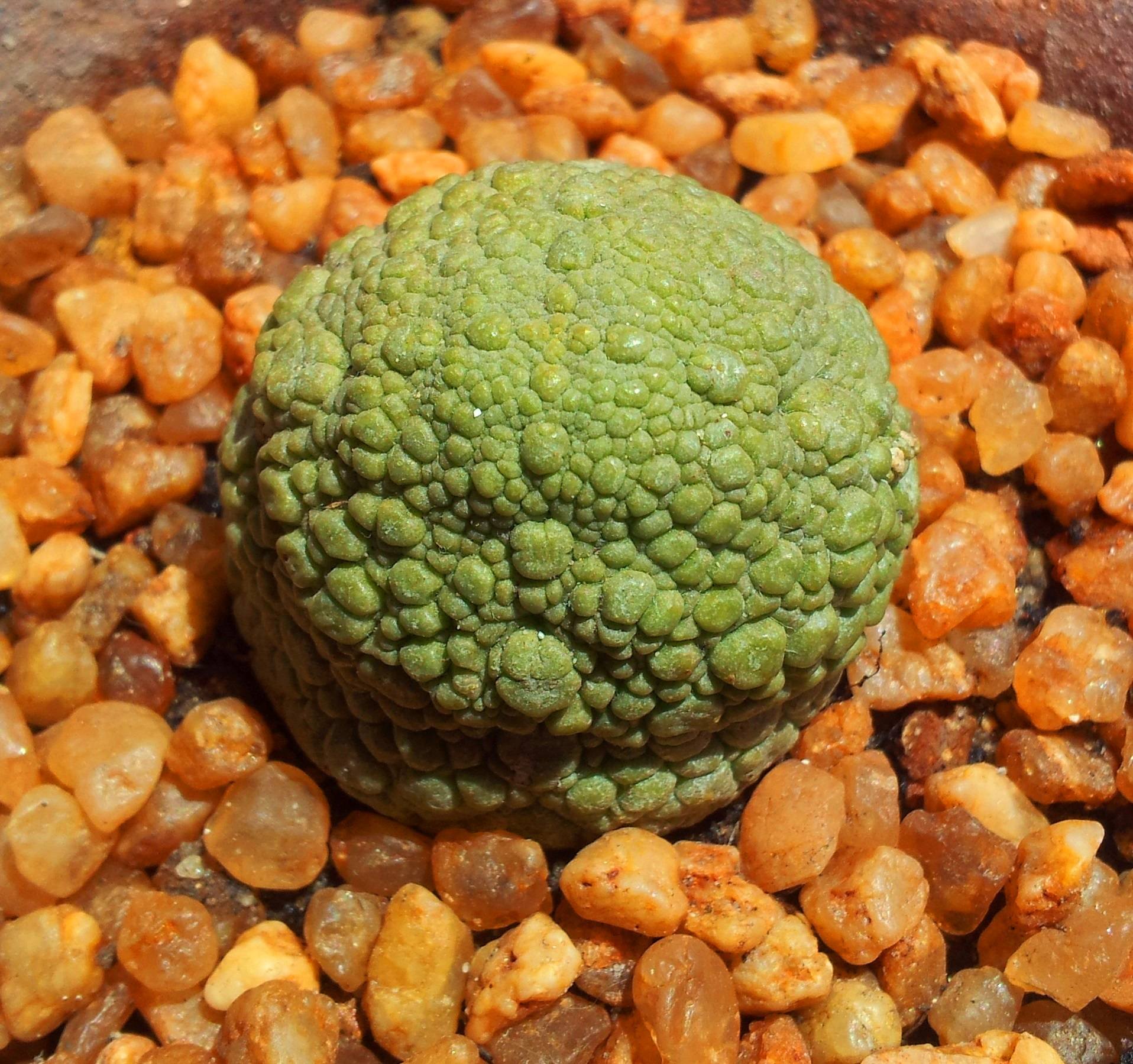
- Pseudolithos migiurtinus in cultivation

Scientific classification
- Kingdom: Plantae
- Clade: Tracheophytes
- Clade: Angiosperms
- Clade: Eudicots
- Clade: Asterids
- Order: Gentianales
- Family: Apocynaceae
- Genus: Pseudolithos
- Species: P. migiurtinus

Binomial name
- Pseudolithos migiurtinus (Chiov.) P.R.O.Bally

= Pseudolithos migiurtinus =

Species of plant

Pseudolithos migiurtinus is a species of succulent plant in the genus Pseudolithos. Native to Somalia, it is akin to other species in the genus in that it grows in arid environments and is a small, leafless plant that looks somewhat like a stone, hence the name (Pseudolithos meaning "false stone"). It can range from green to ochre in color. This species is up to 120 millimetres (4.7 in) high and 65 millimetres (2.6 in) around, can be either cubiform or cylindrical in form, and may grow small branching columns in older plants.
