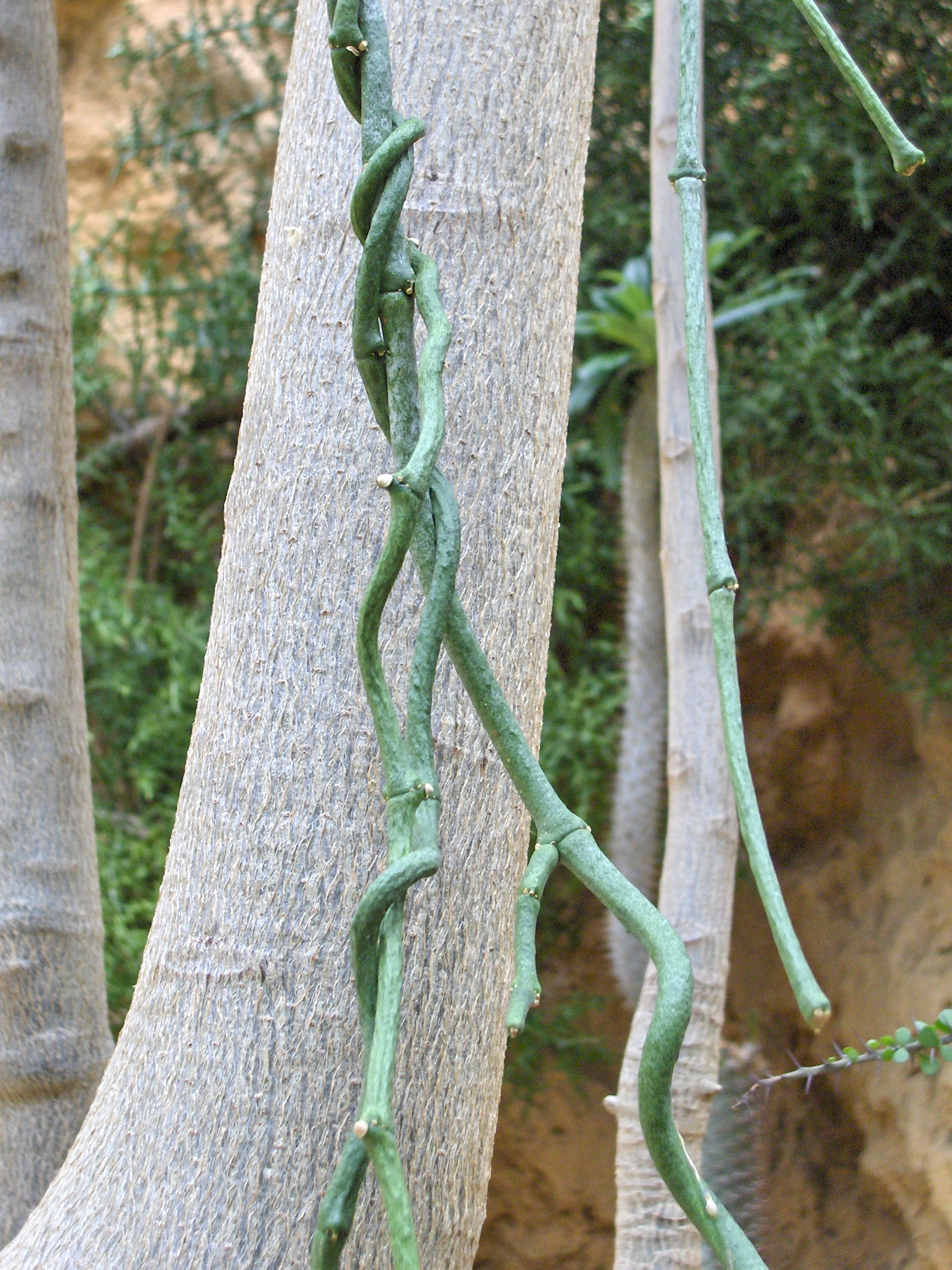
- In the foreground, Cynanchum aphyllum

Scientific classification
- Kingdom: Plantae
- Clade: Embryophytes
- Clade: Tracheophytes
- Clade: Spermatophytes
- Clade: Angiosperms
- Clade: Eudicots
- Clade: Asterids
- Order: Gentianales
- Family: Apocynaceae
- Subfamily: Asclepiadoideae
- Tribe: Asclepiadeae
- Genus: Cynanchum; L.

Species
- 262, see text

Synonyms
- List: Adelostemma Hook.f.; Ampelamus Raf.; Aphanostelma Schltr.; Bunburia Harv.; Cyathella Decne., non Brot., fungal name; Cynoctonum E.Mey., nom. illeg.; Decanemopsis Costantin & Gallaud; Dicarpophora Speg.; Drepanostemma Jum. & H.Perrier; Enslenia Nutt., nom. illeg.; Exostegia Bojer ex Decne.; Flanagania Schltr.; Folotsia Costantin & Bois; Gilgia Pax; Glossonema Decne.; Graphistemma (Chapm. ex Benth.) Champ. ex Benth.; Holostemma R.Br.; Karimbolea Desc.; Mahafalia Jum. & H.Perrier; Mastostigma Stocks; Mellichampia A.Gray ex S.Watson; Metalepis Griseb.; Metaplexis R.Br.; Monostemma Turcz.; Nematostemma Choux; Nematuris Turcz.; Odontanthera Wight; Pentarrhinum E.Mey.; Perianthostelma Baill.; Petalostemma R.Br., nom. nud.; Platykeleba N.E.Br.; Prosopostelma Baill.; Psanchum Neck., opus utique oppr.; Pycnoneurum Decne.; Raphistemma Wall.; Rhodostegiella (Pobed.) C.Y.Wu & D.Z.Li; Roulinia Decne., nom. illeg.; Rouliniella Vail; Sarcocyphula Harv.; Sarcostemma R.Br.; Sarmasikia Bubani; Schizocorona F.Muell.; Seshagiria Ansari & Hemadri; Sichuania M.G.Gilbert & P.T.Li; Steinheilia Decne.; Symphyoglossum Turcz.; Telminostelma E.Fourn.; Urostelma Bunge; Voharanga Costantin & Bois; Vohemaria Buchenau; Ziervoglia Neck.

= Cynanchum =

Genus of flowering plants in the dogbane family

Cynanchum is a genus of about 300 species including some swallowworts, belonging to the family Apocynaceae. The taxon name comes from Greek kynos (meaning "dog") and anchein ("to choke"), hence the common name for several species is dog-strangling vine. Most species are non-succulent climbers or twiners. There is some evidence of toxicity.

== Morphology ==
These plants are perennial herbs or subshrubs, often growing from rhizomes. The leaves are usually oppositely arranged and sometimes are borne on petioles. The inflorescences and flowers come in a variety of shapes.

Like other species of the milkweed family, these plants bear follicles, which are podlike dry fruits.

== Distribution ==
These species are found throughout the tropics and subtropics. Several species also grow in temperate regions.

== Importance ==
Species of the Cynanchum genus had traditional Chinese medicinal uses. The root of Cynanchum atratum is used in Chinese traditional medicine and called Bai wei (白薇). Baishouwubenzophenone is used in Cynanchum wilfordii, Cynanchum auriculatum (now Vincetoxicum auriculatum), and Cynanchum bungei.

== Classification ==
Cynanchum as defined in the late 20th century (to include about 400 species) is polyphyletic and is being broken up. Species are being moved to genera including Orthosia, Pentarrhinum, and Vincetoxicum, with a group of mostly Old World species staying in Cynanchum, and old genera such as Raphistemma brought to synonymy. Revision of the genus taxonomy in 2023 identified two new synonyms: Vincetoxicum sibiricum f. linearifolium, described from Shandong, China in 1877, but long neglected and Cynanchum gobicum, previously believed to be endemic to Mongolia.

== Species ==
As of February 2023, Plants of the World Online accepted the following species:

- Cynanchum absconditum Liede
- Cynanchum abyssinicum Decne.
- Cynanchum acidum (Roxb.) Oken
- Cynanchum aculeatum (Desc.) Liede & Meve
- Cynanchum acuminatum Humb. & Bonpl. ex Schult.
- Cynanchum acutum L.
- Cynanchum adalinae (K.Schum.) K.Schum.
- Cynanchum africanum (L.) Hoffmanns.
- Cynanchum alatum Wight & Arn.
- Cynanchum alternilobum (M.G.Gilbert & P.T.Li) Liede & Khanum
- Cynanchum altiscandens K.Schum.
- Cynanchum ambovombense (Liede) Liede & Meve
- Cynanchum ampanihense Jum. & H.Perrier
- Cynanchum analamazaotrense Choux
- Cynanchum anderssonii Morillo
- Cynanchum andringitrense Choux
- Cynanchum angavokeliense Choux
- Cynanchum annularium (Roxb.) Liede & Khanum
- Cynanchum ansamalense Liede
- Cynanchum anthonyanum Hand.-Mazz.
- Cynanchum antsiranense (Meve & Liede) Liede & Meve
- Cynanchum appendiculatopsis Liede
- Cynanchum appendiculatum Choux
- Cynanchum arabicum (Bruyns & P.I.Forst.) Meve & Liede
- Cynanchum arenarium Jum. & H.Perrier
- Cynanchum areysianum (Bruyns) Meve & Liede
- Cynanchum balense Liede
- Cynanchum baronii Choux
- Cynanchum batangense P.T.Li
- Cynanchum beatricis Morillo
- Cynanchum bernardii Morillo
- Cynanchum bicampanulatum M.G.Gilbert & P.T.Li
- Cynanchum bisinuatum Jum. & H.Perrier
- Cynanchum blandum (Decne.) Sundell
- Cynanchum blyttioides Liede
- Cynanchum bojerianum (Decne.) Choux
- Cynanchum bosseri Liede
- Cynanchum boudieri H.Lév. & Vaniot
- Cynanchum boveanum Decne.
- Cynanchum bowmanii S.T.Blake
- Cynanchum brasiliense (Morillo) Liede
- Cynanchum brevicoronatum M.G.Gilbert & P.T.Li
- Cynanchum brevipedicellatum (P.I.Forst.) Liede & Meve
- Cynanchum brevipedunculatum J.Y.Shen
- Cynanchum bricenoi Morillo
- Cynanchum bungei Decne.
- Cynanchum callialatum Buch.-Ham. ex Wight
- Cynanchum carautanum (Fontella & E.A.Schwarz) Morillo
- Cynanchum caudiculatum Rapini
- Cynanchum caudigerum R.W.Holm
- Cynanchum celebicum Schltr.
- Cynanchum chanchanense Morillo
- Cynanchum chinense R.Br.
- Cynanchum chouxii Liede & Meve
- Cynanchum comorense Choux
- Cynanchum compactum Choux
- Cynanchum corymbosum Wight
- Cynanchum crassiantherae Liede
- Cynanchum crassipedicellatum Meve & Liede
- Cynanchum cristalinense Morillo
- Cynanchum cuatrecasasii Morillo
- Cynanchum cubense (A.Rich.) Woodson
- Cynanchum cucullatum N.E.Br.
- Cynanchum cyathiforme (Sundell) W.D.Stevens
- Cynanchum dalhousiae Wight
- Cynanchum daltonii (Decne.) Liede & Meve
- Cynanchum danguyanum Choux
- Cynanchum decaryi Choux
- Cynanchum decipiens C.K.Schneid.
- Cynanchum decorsei (Costantin & Gallaud) Liede & Meve
- Cynanchum defilippii Delponte
- Cynanchum descoingsii Rauh
- Cynanchum diazmirandae Morillo
- Cynanchum dimidiatum (Hassk.) Boerl.
- Cynanchum doleriticum Goyder
- Cynanchum dombeyanum (Decne.) Morillo
- Cynanchum duclouxii M.G.Gilbert & P.T.Li
- Cynanchum elachistemmoides (Liede & Meve) Liede & Meve
- Cynanchum elegans (Benth.) Domin
- Cynanchum ellipticum (Harv.) R.A.Dyer
- Cynanchum erikseniae Morillo
- Cynanchum erythranthum Jum. & H.Perrier
- Cynanchum ethiopicum Liede & Khanum
- Cynanchum eurychitoides (K.Schum.) K.Schum.
- Cynanchum eurychiton (Decne.) K.Schum.
- Cynanchum falcatum Hutch. & E.A.Bruce
- Cynanchum fasciculiflorum Morillo
- Cynanchum fernandezii Morillo
- Cynanchum fimbricoronum P.T.Li
- Cynanchum floribundum R.Br.
- Cynanchum floriferum Liede & Meve
- Cynanchum foetidum (Cav.) Kunth
- Cynanchum folotsioides Liede & Meve
- Cynanchum forskaolianum Meve & Liede
- Cynanchum fragrans (Wall.) Liede & Khanum
- Cynanchum gentryi (Morillo) Liede
- Cynanchum gerrardii (Harv.) Liede
- Cynanchum gilbertii Liede
- Cynanchum giraldii Schltr.
- Cynanchum glomeratum Bosser
- Cynanchum gobicum Grubov
- Cynanchum goertsianum Morillo
- Cynanchum gonoloboides Schltr.
- Cynanchum gracillimum Wall. ex Wight
- Cynanchum graminiforme Liede
- Cynanchum grandidieri Liede & Meve
- Cynanchum graphistemmatoides Liede & Khanum
- Cynanchum guatemalense Dugand
- Cynanchum guehoi Bosser
- Cynanchum hardyi Liede & Meve
- Cynanchum hastifolium K.Schum.
- Cynanchum haughtii Woodson
- Cynanchum hemsleyanum (Oliv.) Liede & Khanum
- Cynanchum heteromorphum Vatke
- Cynanchum heydei Hook.f.
- Cynanchum hickenii Malme
- Cynanchum hoedimeerium Bakh.f.
- Cynanchum hooperianum (Blume) Liede & Khanum
- Cynanchum hubeiense Wen B.Xu, B.S.Xia & J.Y.Shen
- Cynanchum humbert-capuronii Liede & Meve
- Cynanchum implicatum (Jum. & H.Perrier) Jum. & H.Perrier
- Cynanchum insigne (N.E.Br.) Liede & Meve
- Cynanchum insipidum (E.Mey.) Liede & Khanum
- Cynanchum insulanum (Hance) Hemsl.
- Cynanchum itremense Liede
- Cynanchum jaliscanum (Vail) Woodson
- Cynanchum jaramilloi Morillo
- Cynanchum juliani-marnieri Desc.
- Cynanchum jumellei Choux
- Cynanchum junciforme (Decne.) Liede
- Cynanchum kaschgaricum Y.X.Liou
- Cynanchum kingdonwardii M.G.Gilbert & P.T.Li
- Cynanchum kintungense Tsiang
- Cynanchum kwangsiense Tsiang & H.D.Zhang
- Cynanchum laeve - honeyvine
- Cynanchum lanhsuense T.Yamaz.
- Cynanchum lecomtei Choux
- Cynanchum ledermannii Schltr.
- Cynanchum leptolepis (Benth.) Domin
- Cynanchum leptostephanum Diels
- Cynanchum leucophellum Diels
- Cynanchum ligulatum (Benth.) Woodson
- Cynanchum lineare N.E.Br.
- Cynanchum liukiuense Warb.
- Cynanchum loheri Schltr.
- Cynanchum longipedunculatum M.G.Gilbert & P.T.Li
- Cynanchum longipes N.E.Br.
- Cynanchum longirostrum (K.Schum.) W.D.Stevens
- Cynanchum lopezpalaciosii Morillo
- Cynanchum luteifluens (Jum. & H.Perrier) Desc.
- Cynanchum lysimachioides Y.Tsiang & P.T.Li
- Cynanchum maasii Morillo
- Cynanchum macranthum Jum. & H.Perrier
- Cynanchum macrolobum Jum. & H.Perrier
- Cynanchum madagascariense K.Schum.
- Cynanchum magale Buch.-Ham. ex Dillwyn
- Cynanchum mahafalense Jum. & H.Perrier
- Cynanchum malampayae (Kloppenb., Cajano & Hadsall) Sodusta
- Cynanchum mariense (Meve & Liede) Liede & Meve
- Cynanchum mariquitense Mutis
- Cynanchum marnieranum Rauh
- Cynanchum masoalense Choux
- Cynanchum maximoviczii Pobed.
- Cynanchum megalanthum M.G.Gilbert & P.T.Li
- Cynanchum membranaceum (Liede & Meve) Liede & Meve
- Cynanchum menarandrense Jum. & H.Perrier
- Cynanchum messeri (Buchenau) Jum. & H.Perrier
- Cynanchum mevei Liede
- Cynanchum meyeri (Decne.) Schltr.
- Cynanchum microstemma (Turcz.) Morillo
- Cynanchum minahassae Schltr.
- Cynanchum montevidense Spreng.
- Cynanchum moramangense Choux
- Cynanchum moratii Liede
- Cynanchum mossambicense K.Schum.
- Cynanchum muricatum (Blume) Boerl.
- Cynanchum napiferum Choux
- Cynanchum natalitium Schltr.
- Cynanchum nematostemma Liede
- Cynanchum nielsenii Morillo
- Cynanchum obovatum (Decne.) Choux
- Cynanchum obtusifolium L.f.
- Cynanchum officinale (Hemsl.) Tsiang & H.D.Zhang
- Cynanchum orangeanum (Schltr.) N.E.Br.
- Cynanchum oresbium (Bruyns) Goyder
- Cynanchum otophyllum C.K.Schneid.
- Cynanchum ovalifolium Wight
- Cynanchum pachycladon Choux
- Cynanchum pamirense Tsiang & H.D.Zhang
- Cynanchum papillatum Choux
- Cynanchum paramorum Morillo
- Cynanchum pearsonianum Liede & Meve
- Cynanchum pedunculatum R.Br.
- Cynanchum peraffine Woodson
- Cynanchum perrieri Choux
- Cynanchum petignatii Liede & Rauh
- Cynanchum phillipsonianum Liede & Meve
- Cynanchum physocarpum Schltr.
- Cynanchum pichi-sermollianum (Raimondo & Fici) Liede & Khanum
- Cynanchum pietrangelii Morillo
- Cynanchum polyanthum K.Schum.
- Cynanchum praecox Schltr. ex S.Moore
- Cynanchum prevostii Morillo
- Cynanchum puberulum F.Muell. ex Benth.
- Cynanchum pulchellum (Wall.) Liede & Khanum
- Cynanchum purpureiflorum Morillo
- Cynanchum purpureum (Pall.) K.Schum.
- Cynanchum pusilum Grubov
- Cynanchum pycnoneuroides Choux
- Cynanchum racemosum (Jacq.) Jacq.
- Cynanchum radians (Forssk.) Lam.
- Cynanchum radiatum Jum. & H.Perrier
- Cynanchum rauhianum Desc.
- Cynanchum registanense Jayanthi
- Cynanchum rensonii (Pittier) Woodson
- Cynanchum repandum (Decne.) K.Schum.
- Cynanchum resiliens (B.R.Adams & R.W.K.Holland) Goyder
- Cynanchum revoilii (Franch.) Khanum & Liede
- Cynanchum riometense Sundell
- Cynanchum rioparanense Sundell
- Cynanchum rossii Rauh
- Cynanchum rostellatum (Turcz.) Liede & Khanum
- Cynanchum roulinioides (E.Fourn.) Rapini
- Cynanchum rubricoronae Liede
- Cynanchum rungweense Bullock
- Cynanchum sahyadricum (Ansari & Hemadri) Liede & Khanum
- Cynanchum sarcomedium Meve & Liede
- Cynanchum schistoglossum Schltr.
- Cynanchum scopulosum Bosser
- Cynanchum sessiliflorum (Decne.) Liede
- Cynanchum sigridiae Meve & M.Teissier
- Cynanchum sinoracemosum M.G.Gilbert & P.T.Li
- Cynanchum socotranum (Lavranos) Meve & Liede
- Cynanchum somaliense (N.E.Br.) N.E.Br.
- Cynanchum staubii Bosser
- Cynanchum stenospira K.Schum.
- Cynanchum stoloniferum (B.R.Adams & R.W.K.Holland) Goyder
- Cynanchum subpaniculatum Woodson
- Cynanchum subtilis Liede
- Cynanchum suluense Schltr.
- Cynanchum sumbawanum Warb.
- Cynanchum surrubriflorum W.D.Stevens
- Cynanchum szechuanense Tsiang & H.D.Zhang
- Cynanchum tamense Morillo
- Cynanchum thruppii (Oliv.) Khanum & Liede
- Cynanchum toliari Liede & Meve
- Cynanchum trollii Liede & Meve
- Cynanchum tsaratananense Choux
- Cynanchum tuberculatum (Blume) Boerl.
- Cynanchum tunicatum (Retz.) Alston
- Cynanchum umtalense Liede
- Cynanchum unguiculatum (Britton) Markgr.
- Cynanchum vanlessenii (Lavranos) Goyder
- Cynanchum verrucosum (Desc.) Liede & Meve
- Cynanchum viminale (L.) L.
- Cynanchum violator R.W.Holm
- Cynanchum virens (E.Mey.) D.Dietr.
- Cynanchum wallichii Wight
- Cynanchum warburgii Schltr.
- Cynanchum wilfordii (Maxim.) Hook.f.
- Cynanchum zeyheri Schltr.

Former species

- Cynanchum auriculatum = Vincetoxicum auriculatum
- Cynanchum arizonicum = Metastelma arizonicum – Arizona swallow-wort or Arizona climbing milkweed
- Cynanchum utahense = Funastrum utahense – Utah swallow-wort or Utah vine milkweed
