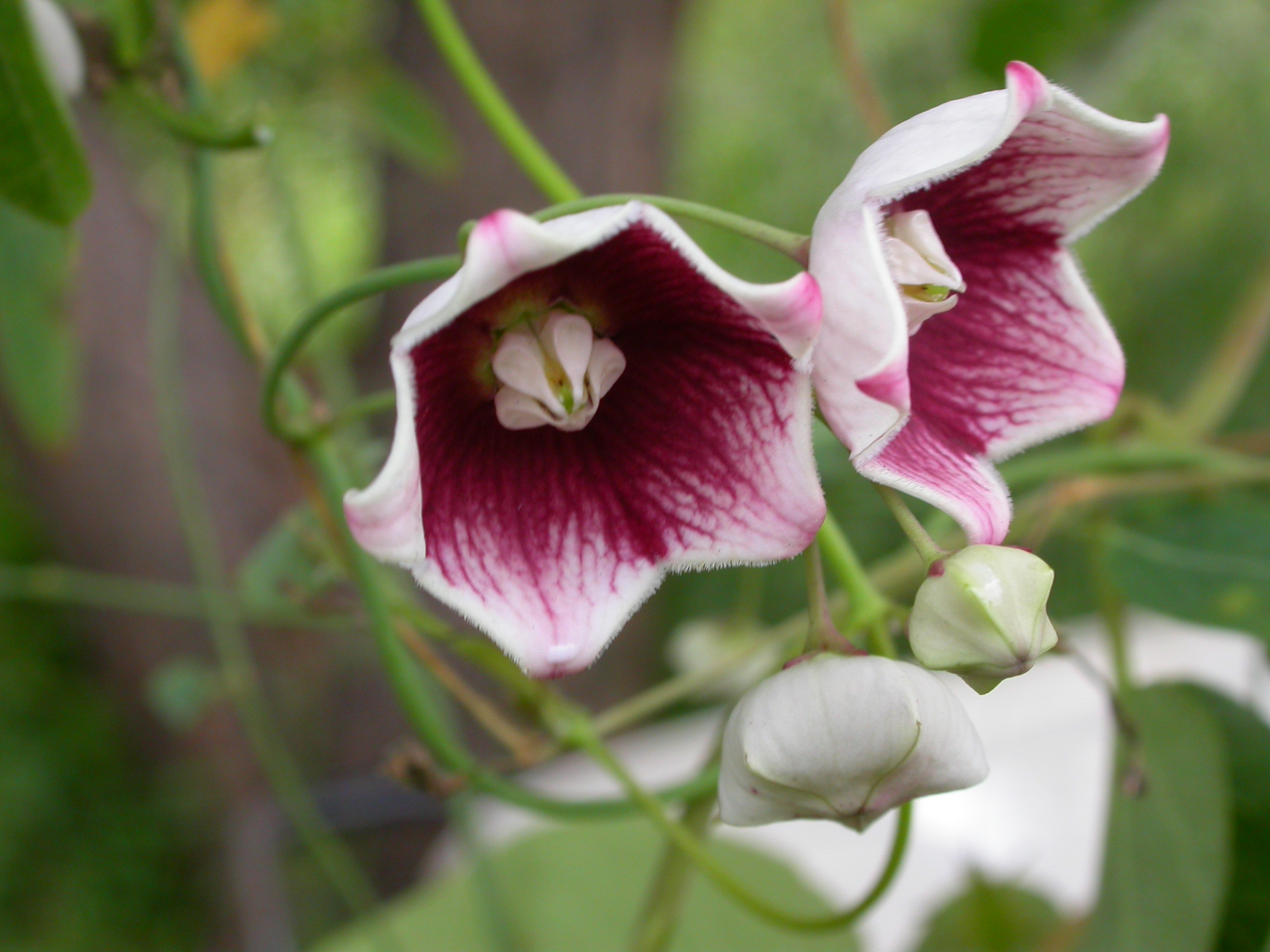
- Oxystelma bornouense

Scientific classification
- Kingdom: Plantae
- Clade: Tracheophytes
- Clade: Angiosperms
- Clade: Eudicots
- Clade: Asterids
- Order: Gentianales
- Family: Apocynaceae
- Subfamily: Asclepiadoideae
- Tribe: Asclepiadeae
- Genus: Oxystelma; R.Br.

Synonyms
- Sarcostemma subgen. Oxystelmum (R. Br.) R.W. Holm

= Oxystelma =

Genus of flowering plants

Oxystelma is a genus of flowering plants of the family Apocynaceae, first described as a genus in 1810. It is native to Africa and Asia.

== Species ==
The Plant List includes:

1. Oxystelma bornouense R.Br. - tropical Africa
2. Oxystelma esculentum (L.f.) Sm. - China (Guangdong, Guangxi, Yunnan), Indochina, Indian Subcontinent (India, Sri Lanka, Bangladesh, Nepal, Pakistan), Middle East, NE Africa

Species that were formerly included

The following species have been moved to other genera (Philibertia, Telosma, and Cynanchum):

1. O. gilliesii now Philibertia gilliesii
2. O. hooperianum now Cynanchum hooperianum
3. O. ovatum now Telosma cordata
4. O. pulchellum now Cynanchum pulchellum
5. O. solanoides now Philibertia solanoides
6. O. vailiae now Philibertia picta
7. O. violacea now Philibertia gilliesii
