= Baishouwubenzophenone =

Names
- Preferred IUPAC name 1-[3-(3,6-dihydroxy-2-methylbenzoyl)-2,4-dihydroxyphenyl]ethanone

Identifiers
| CAS Number | 115834-34-9 |
| 3D model (JSmol) | Interactive image |
| ChemSpider | 2340121 |
| PubChem CID | 3082748 |
| CompTox Dashboard (EPA) | DTXSID60151204 |
- InChI: InChI=1S/C16H14O6/c1-7-10(18)5-6-11(19)13(7)16(22)14-12(20)4-3-9(8(2)17)15(14)21/h3-6,18-21H,1-2H3
- SMILES: CC1=C(C=CC(=C1C(=O)C2=C(C=CC(=C2O)C(=O)C)O)O)O

Properties
| Chemical formula | C_{16}H_{14}O_{6} |
| Molar mass | 302.282 g·mol^{−1} |
| Appearance | Colorless needles |
- Except where otherwise noted, data are given for materials in their standard state (at 25 °C [77 °F], 100 kPa). Infobox references

Baishouwubenzophenone is a naturally occurring atropisomeric compound with the formula C_{16}H_{14}O_{6}. Classified as a benzophenone derivative, it has been isolated from the roots of several species in the genus Cynanchum, including Cynanchum wilfordii, Cynanchum auriculatum (now Vincetoxicum auriculatum), and Cynanchum bungei.

== Structure and properties ==
Baishouwubenzophenone has the molecular formula C_{16}H_{14}O_{6}. Structurally, it consists of two aromatic rings connected by a central carbonyl group, characteristic of the benzophenone framework. The molecule contains multiple hydroxyl groups, which contribute to its positive reaction with ferric chloride (FeCl_{3}), indicative of phenolic functionality.

Baishouwubenzophenone is an example of a non-biaryl atropisomer. The presence of bulky substituents ortho to the carbonyl bridge on both aromatic rings results in restricted rotation around the Ar–CO–Ar axis, giving rise to stable atropisomers. Both (R)- and (S)-enantiomers have been observed. The absolute configuration and chiroptical properties of the compound have been elucidated using techniques such as experimental electronic circular dichroism (ECD) and time-dependent density functional theory (TDDFT) calculations.

== Applications ==
Baishouwubenzophenone is thought to contribute to the pharmacological properties of Cynanchum species, which have been used in traditional Chinese medicine for their tonic agents and exhibit various pharmacological activities like anti-tumor, antioxidant, gastroprotective, anti-aging, and immune regulatory effects. In addition to its role in natural product chemistry, baishouwubenzophenone has been investigated as a potential atropisomeric ligand for use in asymmetric catalysis. Its rigid chiral scaffold and multiple coordination sites make it a candidate for applications in enantioselective synthesis.
