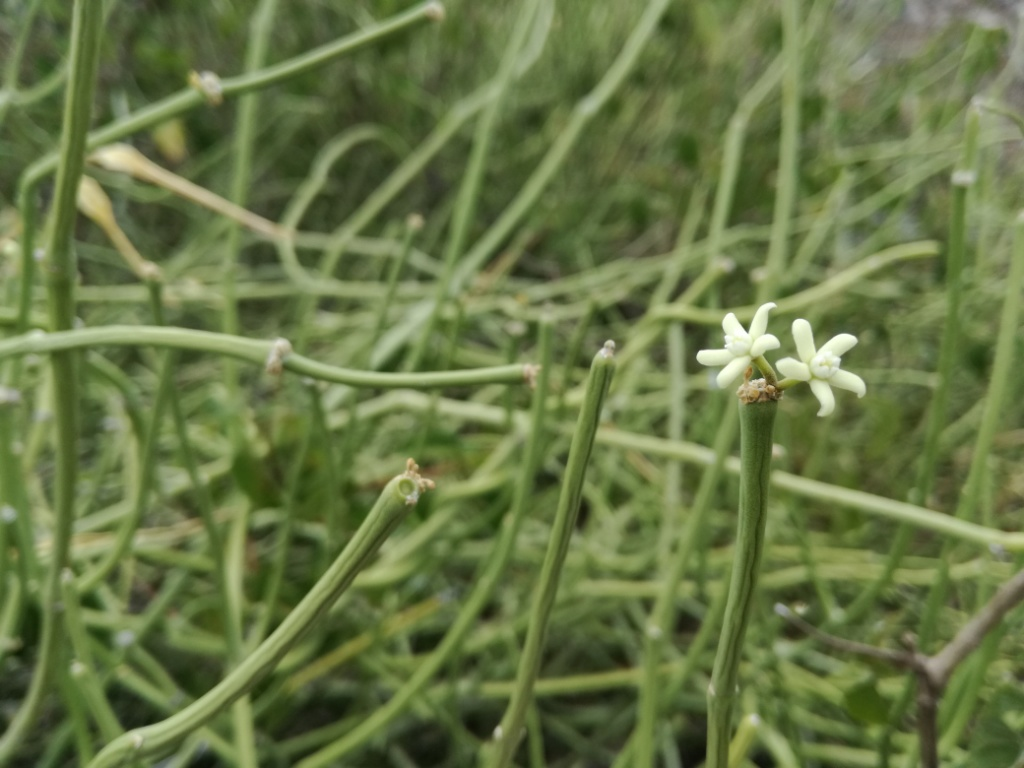
- The Rodrigues cynanchum growing at Anse Quitor Nature Reserve

Scientific classification
- Kingdom: Plantae
- Clade: Tracheophytes
- Clade: Angiosperms
- Clade: Eudicots
- Clade: Asterids
- Order: Gentianales
- Family: Apocynaceae
- Genus: Cynanchum
- Species: C. guehoi

Binomial name
- Cynanchum guehoi Bosser

= Cynanchum guehoi =

Species of plant

Cynanchum guehoi, the Rodrigues cynanchum, is a rare plant from the subfamily Asclepiadoideae in the family Apocynaceae. It is endemic to the island of Rodrigues in the Indian Ocean.

== Description ==
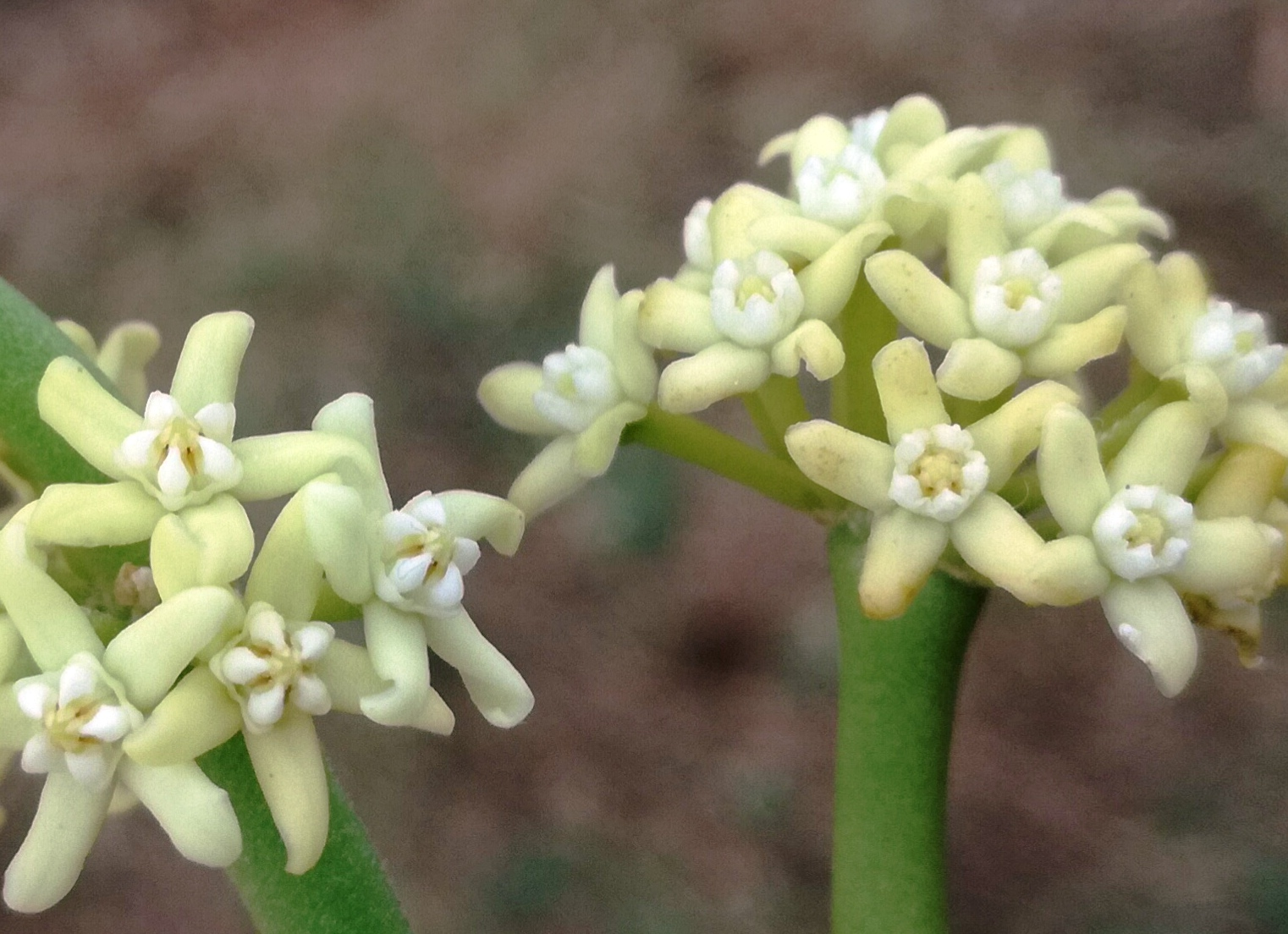
Flower comparison between the widespread Cynanchum viminale (left) and the endemic Rodrigues cynanchum (right). Note the tusk-like inner lobes of the C.viminale flowers, which are skirted by a low ring around the corona base. The inner lobes of C. guehoi are fused into one round, compact cylinder. Each lobe-tip is thickened and triangular, and there is no ring around the corona base.

Cynanchum guehoi is a leafless vine with cylindrical, twining, fleshy, glabrous stems and a toxic white sap. When not in flower it is extremely easy to confuse with the common Cynanchum viminale which is widespread across Africa and southern Asia and also naturally occurs in Rodrigues.

The fragrant flowers smell faintly of Jasmine. They are born in bunches, at the branch internodes. Each flower has five outer lobes, which open out and look like the petals of a flower. However the Rodrigues cynanchum's inner lobes are formed into a single corona in the centre, about 1.5 mm high. The tip of each inner lobe is triangular, with a thick, slightly curved lip.

The related Cynanchum viminale also has five outer lobes resembling petals. However the corona is skirted at its base by a thin ring (the outer coronal ring). Its inner coronal lobes are smooth, oval and curved inwards like tusks.
