= Metastelma anegadense =

Conservation status
- Endangered (IUCN 3.1)

Scientific classification
- Kingdom: Plantae
- Clade: Tracheophytes
- Clade: Angiosperms
- Clade: Eudicots
- Clade: Asterids
- Order: Gentianales
- Family: Apocynaceae
- Genus: Metastelma
- Species: M. anegadense

Binomial name
- Metastelma anegadense Britton

Species of plant

Metastelma anegadense, the wire wist, is a species of plant in the family Apocynaceae endemic to the British Virgin Islands. It is found only on the islands of Anegada and Virgin Gorda. It grows on sand dunes, limestone, and occasionally in dry forests. It is classified as being endangered by the IUCN due to its extremely limited range and ongoing habitat degradation. It is threatened by infrastructural development and illegal sand mining.

== Taxonomy ==
Metastelma anegadense was formally described in 1925 based on specimens from sand dunes on the West End of Anegada in the British Virgin Islands. Locally, the species is called the wire wist.

== Description ==
The species is a climbing plant that grows up to a metre long with thin green stems.

== Distribution and habitat ==
Metastelma anegadense is endemic to the British Virgin Islands, being found only on the islands of Anegada and Virgin Gorda. Reports from Tortola are unconfirmed, while a record from Isla de Mona is definitely mistaken and based off a misidentification of a congener. The species is fairly common on Anegada, especially in the northwestern and eastern portions of the island. On Virgin Gorda, it has a much more restricted range, having been documented only from Leverick Bay once in 2013, with subsequent searches failing to turn up any individuals. It grows on sand dunes, limestone, and occasionally in dry forests.

== Conservation ==
Metastelma anegadense is classified as being endangered by the IUCN due to its extremely limited range, with an estimated occupied area of just 15 km^{2}, and ongoing habitat degradation on the two islands it inhabits. It was formerly considered to be critically endangered as it was known only from a limited region of Anegada, but the revelation that it is fairly widespread on that island and also present on Virgin Gorda led to its downlisting. However, it is known from a single locality on the latter island, which may already have been destroyed by road and building construction, so its status there is perilous. On Anegada, it is threatened by infrastructural development and illegal sand mining, an especially acute issue in the sand dunes that are its preferred habitat. Besides these, the impacts of climate change and introduced species are also threats to the plant.

Metastelma anegadense does not occur in any protected areas; the only proposal for a protected area in its range was made on the basis of a Ramsar site, with the majority of the species' distribution on Anegada falling outside this site. It has been suggested that parts of the plant's range be protected as an Important Plant Area. Conservation actions currently underway for the species include the deposition of seeds at the Millennium Seed Bank and the rearing of plants at Kew Gardens in the UK and at the J. R. O'Neal Botanic Gardens on Tortola. The captive cultivation of this plant is difficult due to its extremely small flowers and inability to pollinate itself.
