= Talayote =

Talayote is:

- a town in Chihuahua, Mexico
- a common name for the plant Cynanchum racemosum
- a common name for the plant Matelea parvifolia
- the Talaiot, megaliths on the islands of Minorca and Majorca
