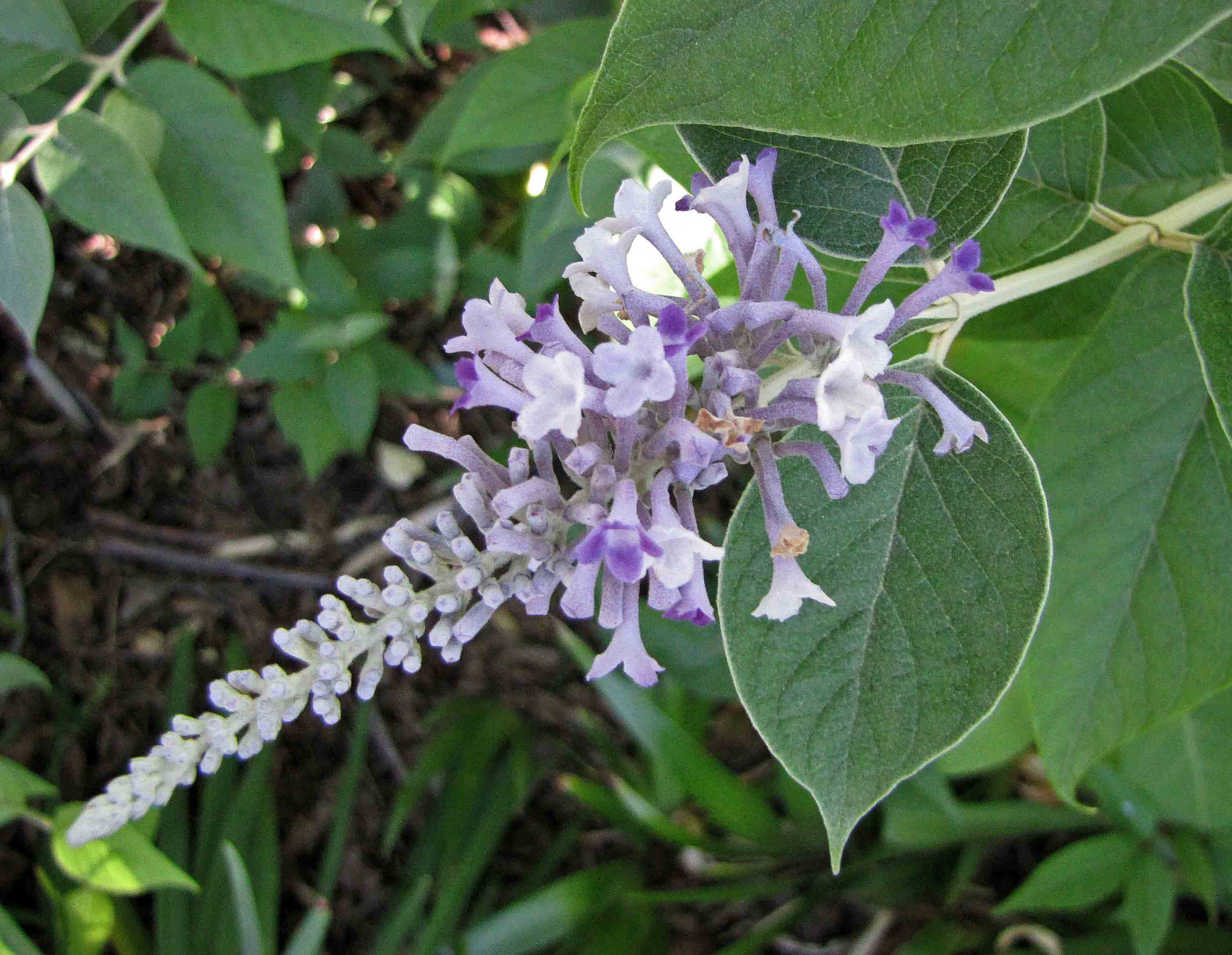

Scientific classification
- Kingdom: Plantae
- Clade: Tracheophytes
- Clade: Angiosperms
- Clade: Eudicots
- Clade: Asterids
- Order: Lamiales
- Family: Scrophulariaceae
- Genus: Buddleja
- Species: B. curviflora

Binomial name
- Buddleja curviflora Hook. & Arn.

Synonyms
- Buddleja formosana Hatusima; Buddleja venenifera Makino; Buddleja curviflora var. venenifera (Makino) Makino

= Buddleja curviflora =

Species of flowering plant

Buddleja curviflora is a deciduous shrub native to southern Japan and Taiwan, where it grows in thickets on stony slopes at elevations of 100–300 m. B. curviflora was named and described Hooker and Arnott in 1838. Plants in Taiwan have been described as a separate species Buddleja formosana and assessed as Critically Endangered by IUCN, but the distinction is not recognized by Li and Leeuwenberg, who sank formosana as a synonym.

== Description ==
Buddleja curviflora grows to < 2 m in height in the wild, its branches subquadrangular in section, and glabrescent. The leaves are opposite, lanceolate to ovate, 5–15 cm long by 2–6 cm wide, the upper surface glabrous, the underside almost glaucous. The purple flowers are borne on slender, terminal, one-sided panicles 5–15 cm long; flowering occurs in June and July. Ploidy 2n = 38 (diploid).

== Cultivation ==
The shrub is rare in cultivation. In the UK, specimens are grown at the Royal Botanic Garden Edinburgh, the Royal Horticultural Society garden at Wisley, and at Longstock Park Nursery, NCCPG national collection holder, near Stockbridge, Hampshire. Hardiness: USDA zones 8–9.
