= Aloe abyssicola =

Conservation status
- CITES Appendix II

Scientific classification
- Kingdom: Plantae
- Clade: Embryophytes
- Clade: Tracheophytes
- Clade: Spermatophytes
- Clade: Angiosperms
- Clade: Monocots
- Order: Asparagales
- Family: Asphodelaceae
- Subfamily: Asphodeloideae
- Genus: Aloe
- Species: A. abyssicola

Binomial name
- Aloe abyssicola Lavranos & Bilaidi

Species of succulent plant endemic to Yemen

Aloe abyssicola is a species of succulent plant in the genus Aloe that is endemic to southern Yemen, where it grows dangling upside-down from cliff faces.

== Taxonomy and etymology ==
Aloe abyssicola was described by John Jacob Lavranos and A. S. Bilaidi in a 1971 issue of the Cactus and Succulent Journal. The specific epithet abyssicola is derived from the Latin terms abyssus, meaning "abyss", and -cola, meaning "dwelling", in reference to the inaccessibility of the type locality.

== Distribution and habitat ==
Aloe abyssicola is known only from the type locality, on the cliffs of Jabal al Arays in southern Yemen, approximately 900 m (3,000 ft) above sea level. It grows upside-down, hanging from the vertical cliff faces.

== Description ==
Aloe abyssicola is a short-stemmed or stemless Aloe that grows upside-down in its natural habitat. The rosette is composed of up to 50 grey-green leaves, each measuring 50 cm (20 in) long and 12 cm (4.7 in) wide. The leaves are edged with blunt, black marginal teeth spaced approximately 35–40 mm (1.4–1.6 in) apart. The 60 cm (24 in) long inflorescence grows downwards and splits into 5 to 6 short, loosely packed racemoid branches that curve upward at the tips. The flowers are yellow-green in colour and measure 25 mm (0.98 in) long.

The leaves and inflorescence of A. abyssicola grow upwards in cultivation, though the plants often take on a pendent habit as they age.
