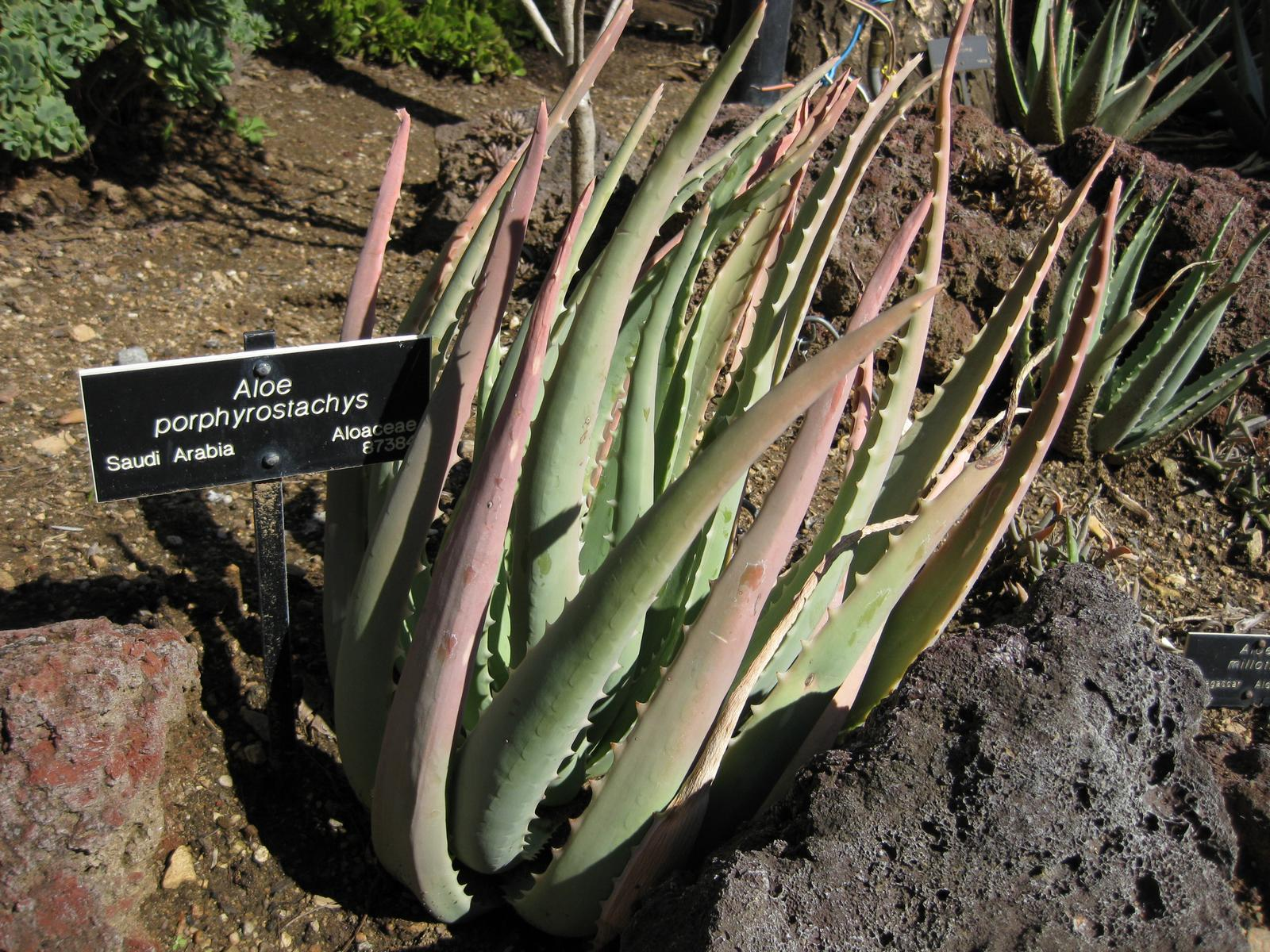
- At the Huntington Library, Art Museum and Botanical Gardens
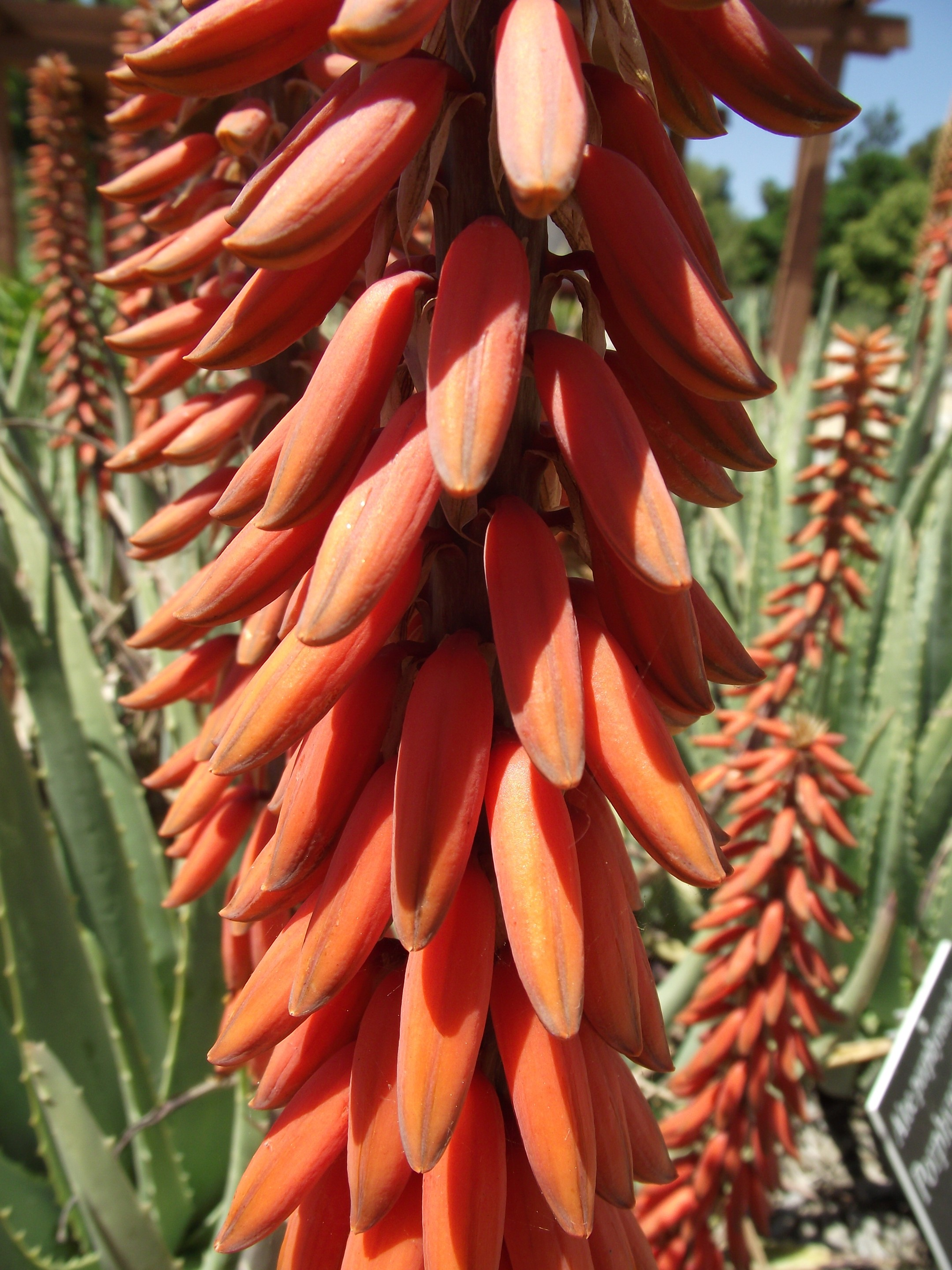
- Inflorescence

Scientific classification
- Kingdom: Plantae
- Clade: Embryophytes
- Clade: Tracheophytes
- Clade: Spermatophytes
- Clade: Angiosperms
- Clade: Monocots
- Order: Asparagales
- Family: Asphodelaceae
- Subfamily: Asphodeloideae
- Genus: Aloe
- Species: A. porphyrostachys

Binomial name
- Aloe porphyrostachys Lavranos & Collen.

Synonyms
- Aloe koenenii Lavranos & Kerstin Koch

= Aloe porphyrostachys =

Species of plant

Aloe porphyrostachys is a species of flowering plant in the family Asphodelaceae. It is native to southwestern Saudi Arabia and southern Jordan. A succulent subshrub, it is found in deserts and drier shrublands.

== Subtaxa ==
The following subspecies are accepted:

- Aloe porphyrostachys subsp. koenenii (Lavranos & Kerstin Koch) Lodé – Near Petra, Jordan, possibly an escaped cultigen
- Aloe porphyrostachys subsp. porphyrostachys – Jabal Radhwa, Saudi Arabia
