= Cynanchum gracillimum =

Scientific classification
- Kingdom: Plantae
- Clade: Tracheophytes
- Clade: Angiosperms
- Clade: Eudicots
- Clade: Asterids
- Order: Gentianales
- Family: Apocynaceae
- Genus: Cynanchum
- Species: C. gracillimum

Binomial name
- Cynanchum gracillimum Wall. ex Wight

Synonyms
- Adelostemma gracillimum (Wall. ex Wight) Hook.f.

Genus of plant

Cynanchum gracillimum is a species of flowering plant in the family Apocynaceae. Under the synonym Adelostemma gracillimum, it was at one time the only species in the genus Adelostemma. It is native to Myanmar and China (Guangxi, Guizhou, Yunnan).
