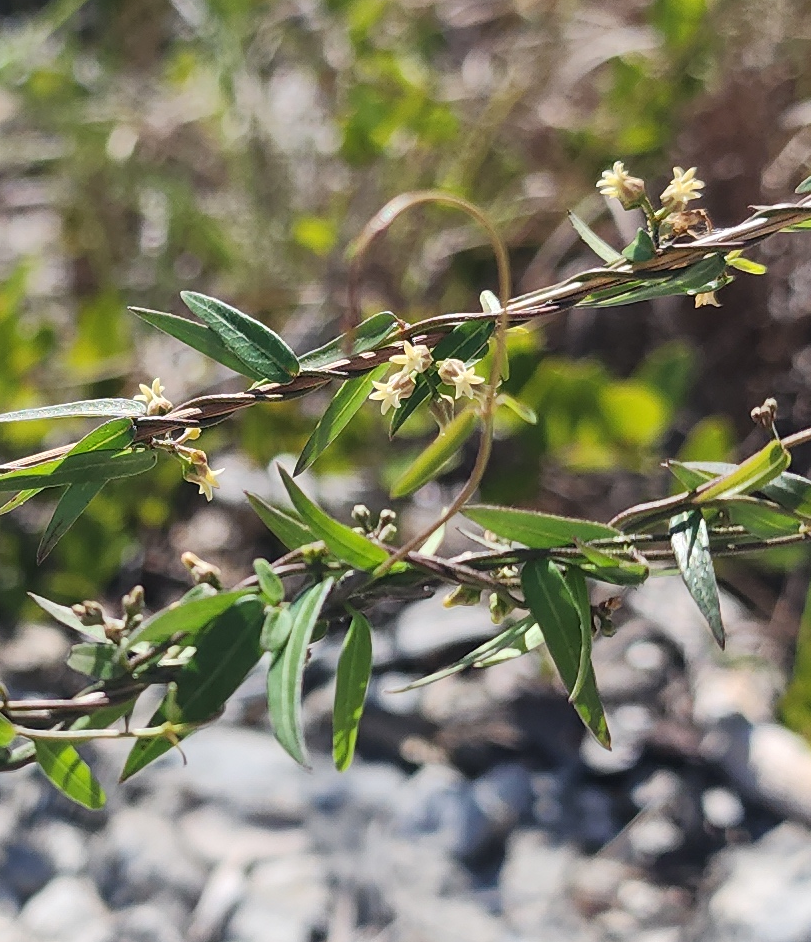
- Blooming in open-canopy pine rockland habitat on Big Pine Key, Florida

Conservation status
- Critically Imperiled (NatureServe)

Scientific classification
- Kingdom: Plantae
- Clade: Tracheophytes
- Clade: Angiosperms
- Clade: Eudicots
- Clade: Asterids
- Order: Gentianales
- Family: Apocynaceae
- Genus: Metastelma
- Species: M. blodgettii

Binomial name
- Metastelma blodgettii A.Gray

Synonyms
- Cynanchum blodgettii (A.Gray) Shinners; Metastelma barbatum Northr.; Metastelma parviflorum Chapm.

= Metastelma blodgettii =

Blodgett's swallow-wort

Species of plant

Metastelma blodgettii, or Blodgett's swallow-wort, is a species of perennial plant in the dogbane family. It is endemic to southern Florida and the Bahamas. It is listed as threatened in Florida.
