= Cynanchum macrolobum =

Scientific classification
- Kingdom: Plantae
- Clade: Embryophytes
- Clade: Tracheophytes
- Clade: Spermatophytes
- Clade: Angiosperms
- Clade: Eudicots
- Clade: Asterids
- Order: Gentianales
- Family: Apocynaceae
- Genus: Cynanchum
- Species: C. macrolobum

Binomial name
- Cynanchum macrolobum Jum. & H.Perrier

Species of plant

Native to the Isalo sandstone mountains of Madagascar, Cynanchum macrolobum is a small succulent shrub belonging to the subfamily Asclepiadoideae of the family Apocynaceae.

== Description ==
Cynanchum macrolobum grows to about 1.3 feet tall, growing as a branching cluster of succulent stems that are near-leafless and covered in waxy, grey, wrinkled skin. Flowers are small and brown. The plant can look impressively surreal when grown alone in a shallow pot.
