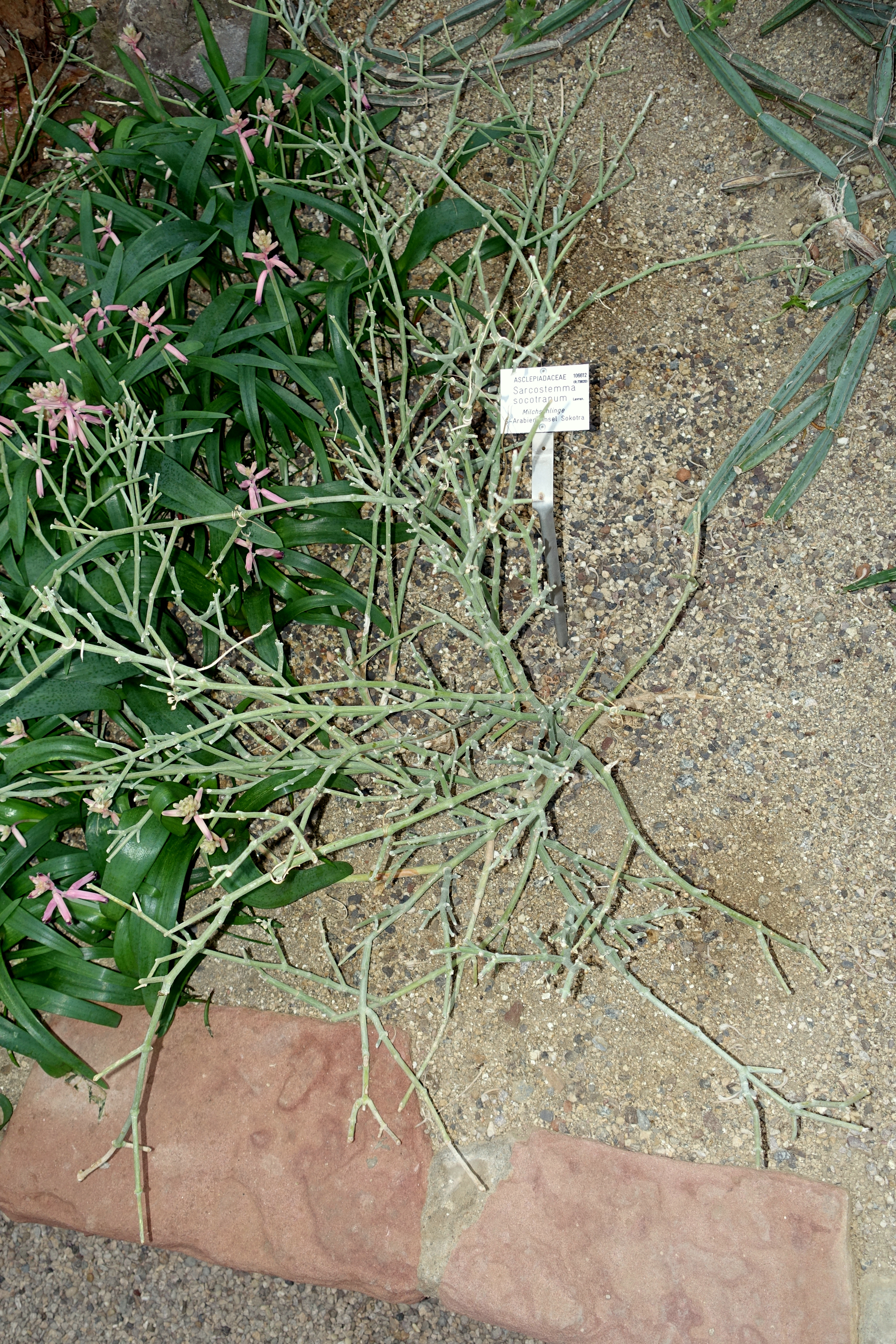

Conservation status
- Data Deficient (IUCN 3.1)

Scientific classification
- Kingdom: Plantae
- Clade: Tracheophytes
- Clade: Angiosperms
- Clade: Eudicots
- Clade: Asterids
- Order: Gentianales
- Family: Apocynaceae
- Genus: Cynanchum
- Species: C. socotranum

Binomial name
- Cynanchum socotranum (Lavranos) Meve & Liede

Synonyms
- Sarcostemma socotranum Lavranos

= Cynanchum socotranum =

Species of plant

Cynanchum socotranum, synonym Sarcostemma socotranum, is a species of plant in the family Apocynaceae. It is endemic to Socotra Island, south of Yemen. Its natural habitat is subtropical or tropical dry shrubland.
