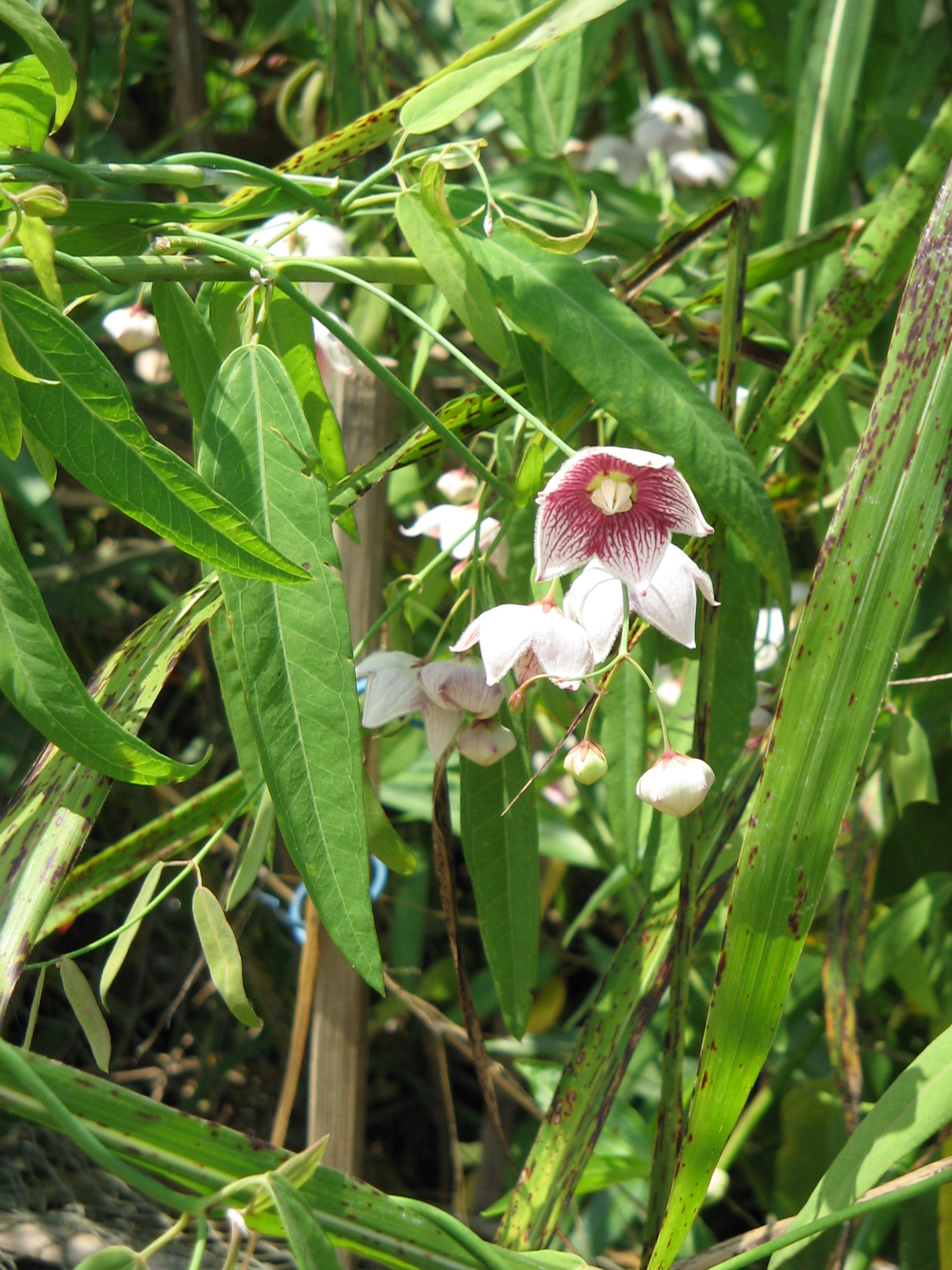

Scientific classification
- Kingdom: Plantae
- Clade: Tracheophytes
- Clade: Angiosperms
- Clade: Eudicots
- Clade: Asterids
- Order: Gentianales
- Family: Apocynaceae
- Genus: Oxystelma
- Species: O. esculentum

Binomial name
- Oxystelma esculentum (L. f.) Sm.

Synonyms
- Oxystelma wallichii Wight; Periploca esculenta L. f.; Sarcostemma esculentum (L. f.) R.W. Holm

= Oxystelma esculentum =

Species of plant

Oxystelma esculentum is a species of flowering plant native to China, South Asia, southeast Asia, northeastern Africa, and south-west Asia. The plant is used in traditional medicine and the fruit is eaten.
