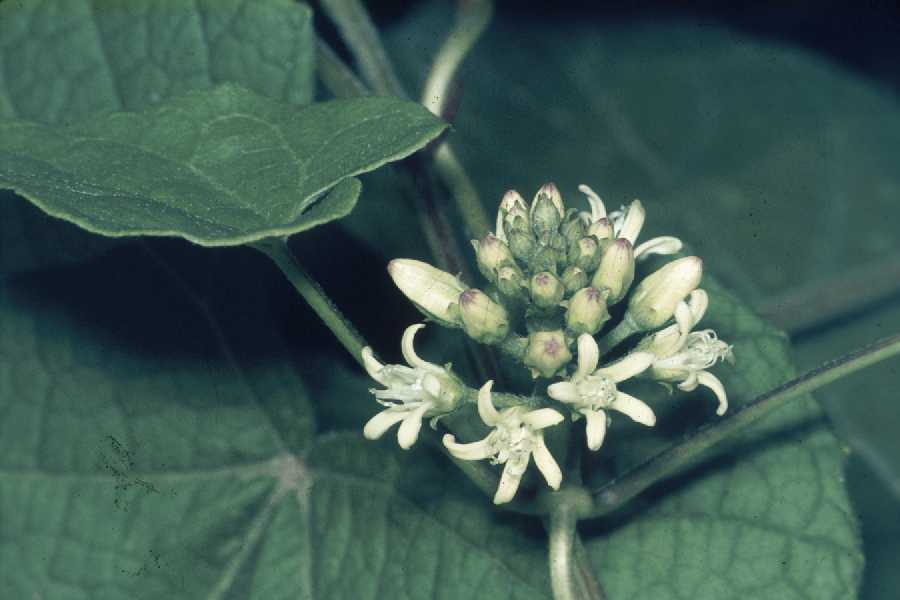

Scientific classification
- Kingdom: Plantae
- Clade: Embryophytes
- Clade: Tracheophytes
- Clade: Spermatophytes
- Clade: Angiosperms
- Clade: Eudicots
- Clade: Asterids
- Order: Gentianales
- Family: Apocynaceae
- Genus: Cynanchum
- Species: C. laeve

Binomial name
- Cynanchum laeve (Michx.) Pers.

Synonyms
- Ampelamus albidus Ampelamus laevis Gonolobus laevis

= Cynanchum laeve =

Species of plant

Cynanchum laeve'

Cynanchum laeve is a vining perennial herb native to eastern and central U.S. states and Ontario. Common names include sand vine, honeyvine, honeyvine milkweed, bluevine milkweed, climbing milkweed, and smooth swallow-wort. The root system of C. laeve can cause it to be very difficult to eradicate, especially in agricultural fields. It is a larval food of monarch butterflies and milkweed tussock moth larvae. C. laeve can cause eye irritation if touched and can be toxic to humans and livestock if consumed in large quantities.

== Taxonomy ==
Cynanchum laeve was originally described in 1803 as Gonolobus laevis Michx. Mixed elements on the type sheet that was published has led to confusion around the correct nomenclature. Currently under the International Plant Names Index it is listed as Cynanchum laeve Pers. Synonymous plant names include Ampelamus albidus (Nutt.) Britton, Ampelamus laevis (Michx.) Krings, and Gonolobus laevis Michx. Cynanchum laeve is in the Apocynaceae, or milkweed family. Cynanchum, or swallow-wort genus, and the laeve, which is a specific epithet meaning smooth .

== Description ==
Cynanchum laeve is a twining vine with heart-shaped leaves and commonly found in roadsides, fence rows, fields, and disturbed areas. C. laeve is easily recognized as a member of the Apocynaceae by its opposite leaves, milky sap, and distinctive flowers and follicles ("milkweed pods"). The seeds are wind dispersed and can travel long distances. Each plant can produce up to 50 follicles. The root system is fleshy and brittle with a large taproot with other lateral roots, these roots can grow up to 6 feet deep. Developing stems are a light pink and produce a milky sap when broken. Vase-shaped flowers have 5 white petals. These occur in clusters on short stalks. C. laeve flowers from June through September.

== Distribution and habitat ==
Cynanchum laeve occurs in the eastern and central United States and Ontario, Canada. C. laeve can be found in wetland areas in the arid West, Atlantic and Gulf Coastal Plain, Eastern mountain and Piedmont, the Great Plains, Midwest, and the North Central and North Eastern United States. Cynanchum laeve typically lives in disturbed habitats such as thickets, low moist fields, riverbanks, fence rows, and cultivated fields.

== Conservation status ==
In Pennsylvania, Cynanchum laeve is listed as endangered.

== Insect use ==
Cynanchum laeve is a food plant of caterpillars of monarch butterflies. Larvae of Euchaetes egle, the milkweed tussock moth, both in the Eastern and Western United States consume C. laeve. The larvae of these moths eat Cynanchum laeve and other plants when developing.

== Human use ==
Cynanchum laeve is not a human edible plant. Its sap can cause eye irritation damaging mucous membranes. If C. laeve is consumed in large quantities it can be toxic. Thorough hand washing is recommended after handling the plant.

== Agricultural use ==
Hay fed to livestock can contain C. laeve which can be toxic when consumed in large quantities. Most animals will not eat C. laeve due to its bitter taste. It is recommended by the US Fish and Wildlife Service to take precautionary steps. These steps include not grazing hungry animals in pastures containing C. laeve, eradicating it from driveways and trails, and closely observing livestock that have just been introduced to areas containing C. laeve. C. laeve can be very difficult to eradicate from fields because of its deep, extensive root system. This vine climbs on other plants, and this can cause problems in crop harvesting.
