= Cynanchum hooperianum =

Scientific classification
- Kingdom: Plantae
- Clade: Embryophytes
- Clade: Tracheophytes
- Clade: Spermatophytes
- Clade: Angiosperms
- Clade: Eudicots
- Clade: Asterids
- Order: Gentianales
- Family: Apocynaceae
- Subfamily: Asclepiadoideae
- Tribe: Asclepiadeae
- Genus: Cynanchum
- Species: C. hooperianum

Binomial name
- Cynanchum hooperianum (Blume) Liede & Khanum

Synonyms
- Oxystelma hooperianum Blume; Raphistemma brevipedunculatum Y.Wan; Raphistemma hooperianum (Blume) Decne.

Species of flowering plant

Cynanchum hooperianum is an Asian species of liana in the family Apocynaceae. Its known distribution includes: Guangxi, Indochina, Java and Sulawesi. In Vietnam it grows in the south of the country and may be called trâm hùng. Before 2016, it had been placed in the genera Oxystelma and Raphistemma.
