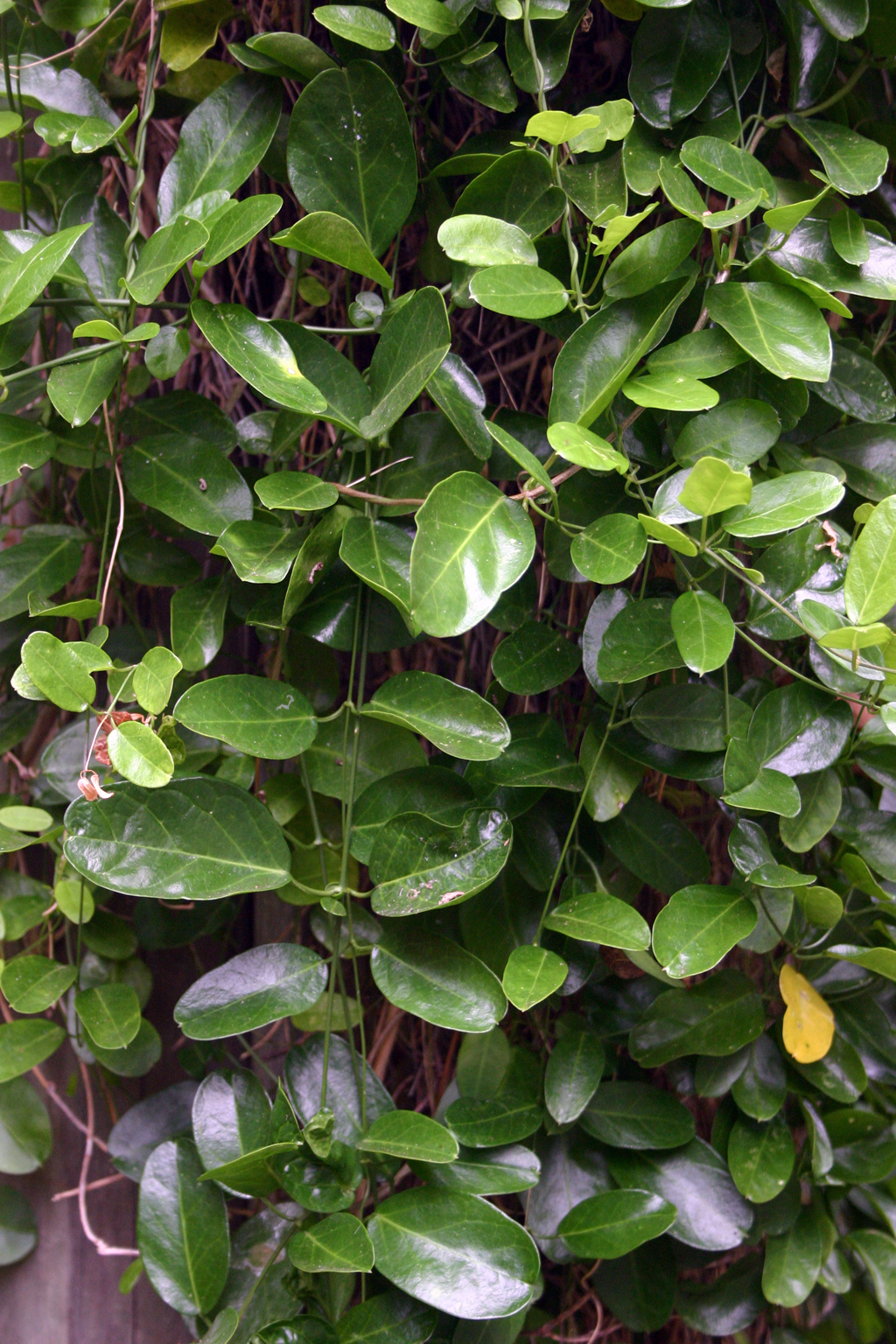
- Cynanchum ellipticum foliage
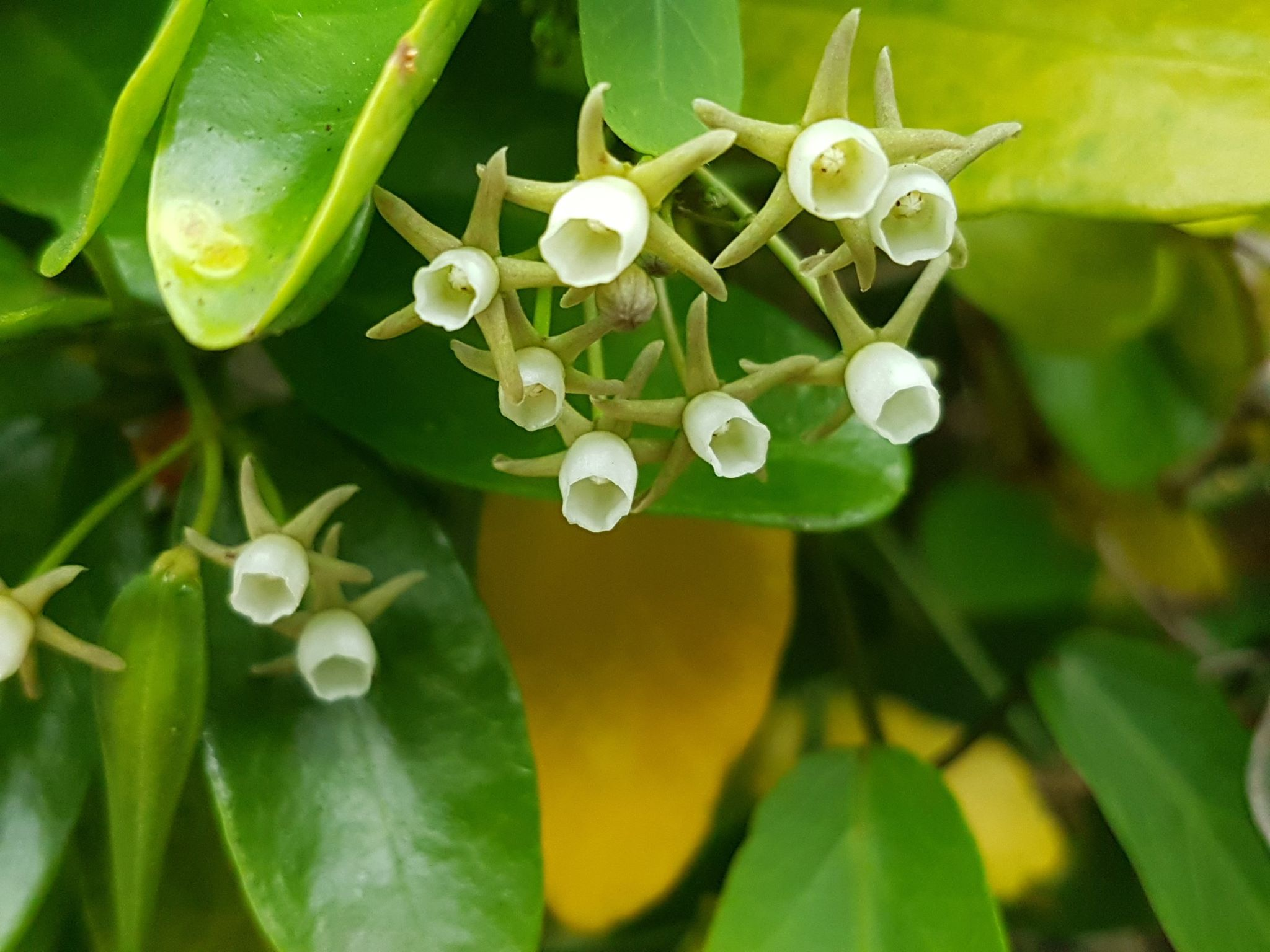
- Flowers of Cynanchum ellipticum

Scientific classification
- Kingdom: Plantae
- Clade: Tracheophytes
- Clade: Angiosperms
- Clade: Eudicots
- Clade: Asterids
- Order: Gentianales
- Family: Apocynaceae
- Genus: Cynanchum
- Species: C. ellipticum

Binomial name
- Cynanchum ellipticum (Harv.) R.A.Dyer

Synonyms
- Bunburia elliptica Harv.

= Cynanchum ellipticum =

Species of plant

Cynanchum ellipticum is a South African climbing plant of the family Apocynaceae. It has slender stems and branches, exuding milky, bitter latex that is non-irritant. It occurs in coastal scrub from Cape Town as far north as Mozambique and further inland up to 1300 m, and may be found on flats or moderate slopes, in sand or between rocks, in indigenous forests and along forest margins and thickets, frequently occurring in disturbed habitats.

This sprawling twiner has opposite semi-succulent leaves 20–40 mm long, 10–20 mm wide, elliptic to oblong, broadly elliptic with a prominent tip (apiculate) and a ring-like thickening where the petioles join the stem. Helicoid cymes of tiny, white or cream flowers grow from the axils of the leaves, having a tubular corolla and being sweetly scented. The horn-shaped fruits or follicles contain club-shaped plumed seeds.

The order Apocynales is renowned for the cardiac glycoside metabolites present in the roots, stems, leaves and seeds of its members. This species produces pregnane glycosides or cynanchosides. Ingestion of leaves by livestock may lead to Cynanchosis aka 'Krampsiekte'. This should not be confused with 'Krimpsiekte', brought on by species of Cotyledon and Tylecodon. Cynanchosis in horses starts with abnormal behaviour and aggression, progressing to pain and lameness in the limbs and ending with an inability to stand. Because of this toxicity the species is regarded as a troublesome weed in some areas.

The genus Cynanchum occurs worldwide and comprises some 200 species, with the major centre of diversity in Africa being in Madagascar where there are approximately 70 species.

The current name was published by R. A. Dyer in The vegetation of the Divisions Albany and Bathurst - Memoirs of the Botanical Survey of South Africa 17: 138. 1937. (Mem. Bot. Surv. S. Africa)

== Synonyms ==
- Cynanchum capense Thunb.
- Vincetoxicum capense (Thunb.) Schltr.
- Bunburia elliptica Harv.

== Gallery ==
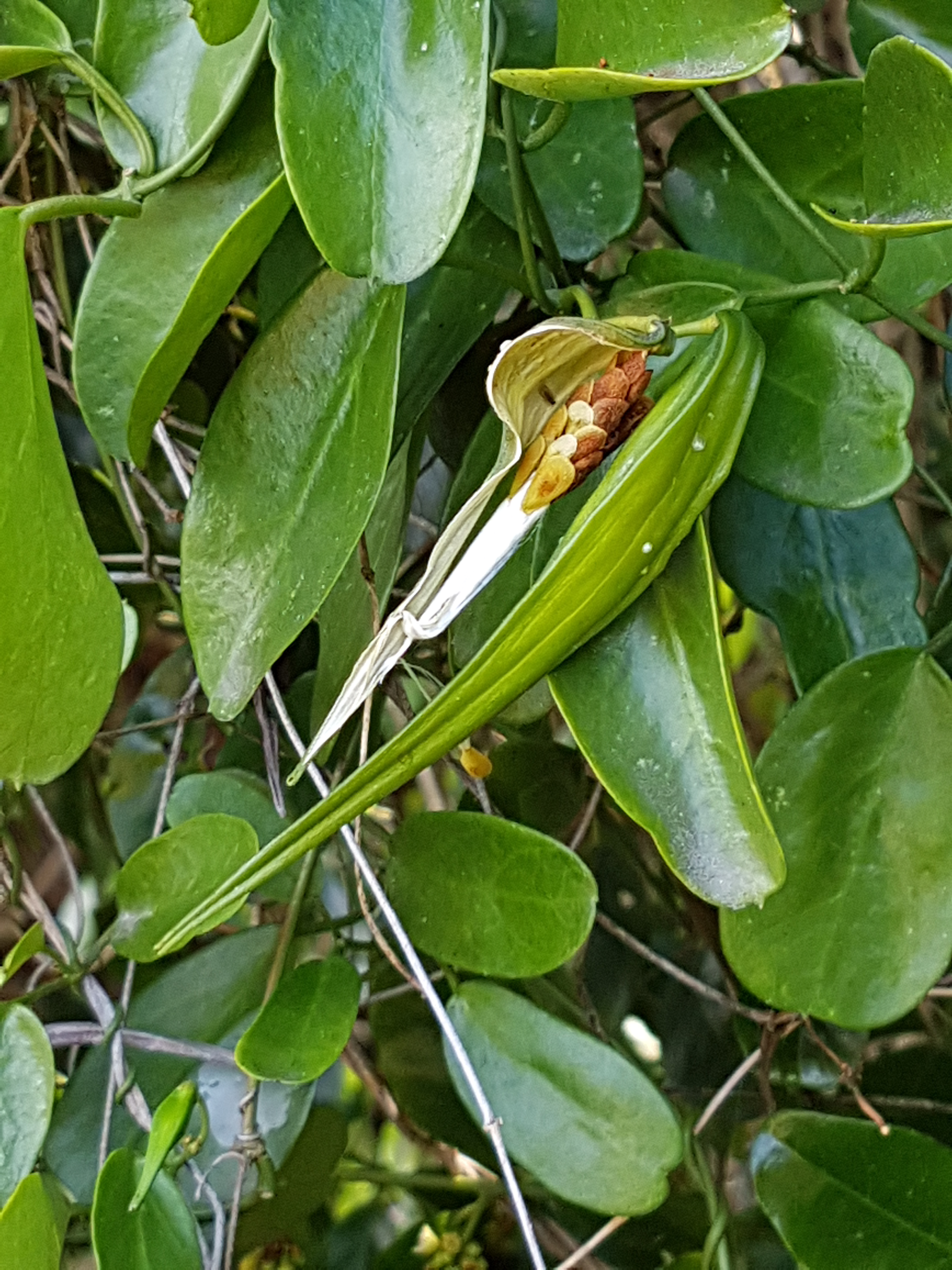
Follicles and seeds

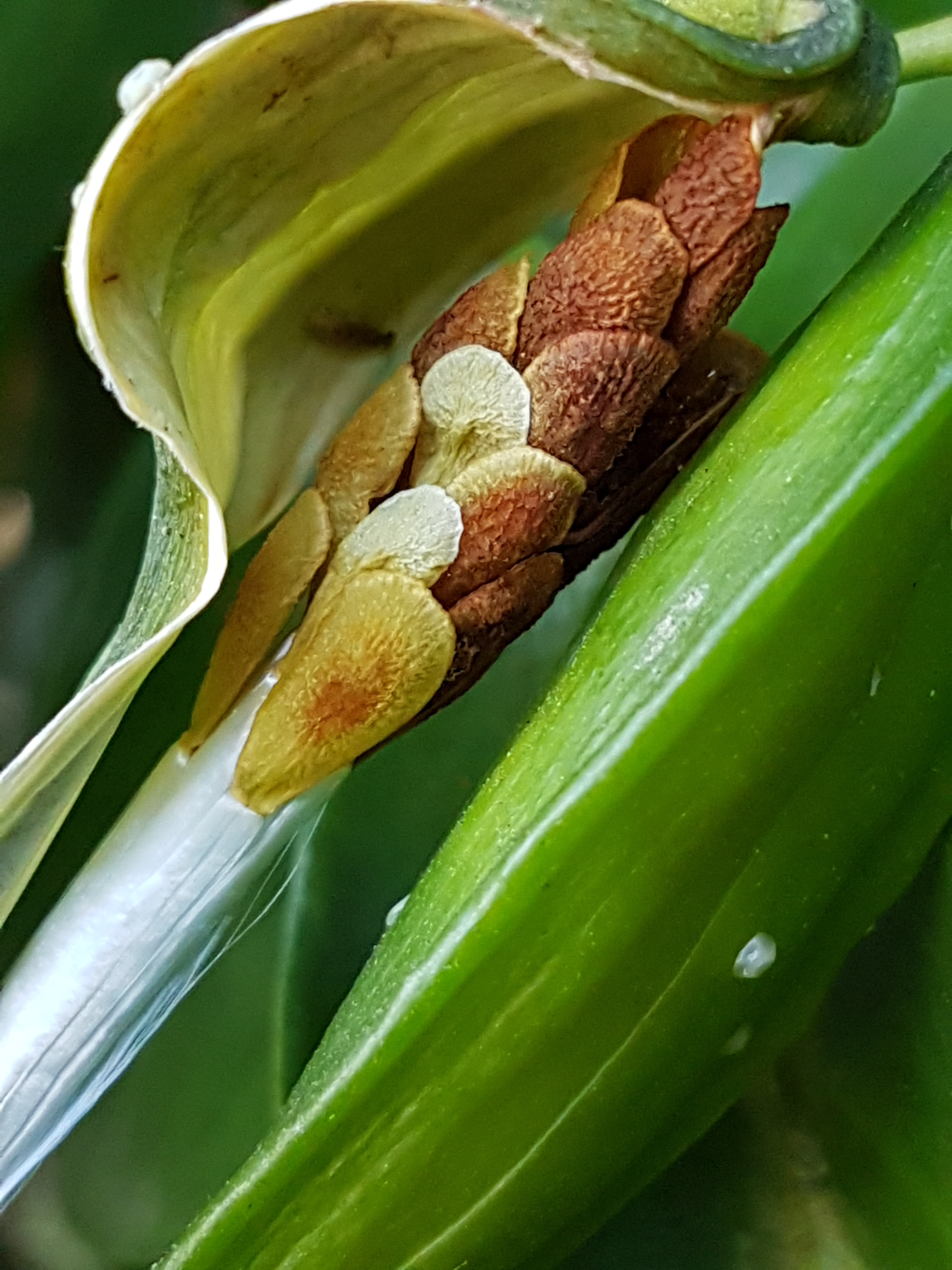
