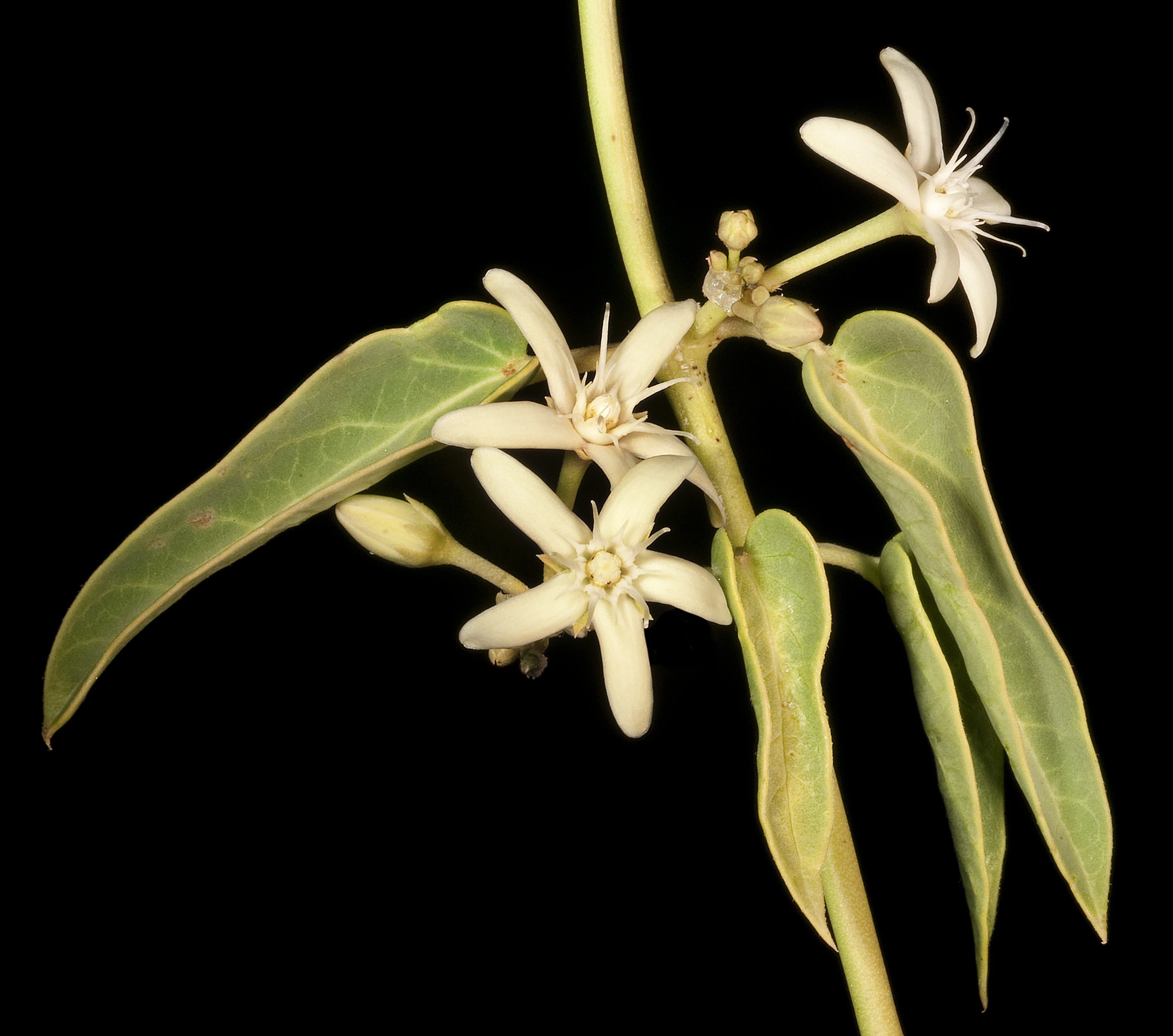

Scientific classification
- Kingdom: Plantae
- Clade: Embryophytes
- Clade: Tracheophytes
- Clade: Spermatophytes
- Clade: Angiosperms
- Clade: Eudicots
- Clade: Asterids
- Order: Gentianales
- Family: Apocynaceae
- Genus: Cynanchum
- Species: C. floribundum

Binomial name
- Cynanchum floribundum R.Br.

= Cynanchum floribundum =

Species of plant

Cynanchum floribundum, commonly known as desert cynanchum, is a flowering plant in the family Apocynaceae and grows in Australia. It is a perennial shrub with twining stems and whitish flowers.

== Description ==
Cynanchum floribundum is a multi-branched perennial, upright or scrambling shrub, often with twining branches. It grows to about 1 m (3 ft 3 in) high and its stems, when snapped, exude a milky sap. Its leaves are borne opposite, oval-shaped to narrowly lance-shaped, 3–9 cm (1.2–3.5 in) long, 10–30 mm (0.39–1.18 in) wide, gradually tapering to a point at the apex, heart-shaped or wedge-shaped at the base, smooth, and on a petiole 1,030 mm (41 in) long. The flowers are in a cluster of 5-8, more or less umbellate, with white to cream lobe-like petals; the corolla is 5–8 mm (0.20–0.31 in) long and borne at the end of a peduncle. Flowering occurs in spring to summer and the fruit is a narrow pale green pod 3–5 cm (1.2–2.0 in) long.

== Taxonomy and naming ==
This species was first formally described in 1810 by Robert Brown and the description was published in Prodromus Florae Novae Hollandiae et Insulae Van Diemen. The specific epithet (floribundum) means 'flowering profusely'.

== Distribution and habitat ==
Desert cynanchum grows on sand dunes, granite rocks, and sometimes on rocky edges of watercourses in New South Wales, Queensland, South Australia and the Northern Territory.
