= Cynanchum violator =

Scientific classification
- Kingdom: Plantae
- Clade: Tracheophytes
- Clade: Angiosperms
- Clade: Eudicots
- Clade: Asterids
- Order: Gentianales
- Family: Apocynaceae
- Genus: Cynanchum
- Species: C. violator

Binomial name
- Cynanchum violator R.W.Holm

Species of plant

Cynanchum violator is a species of flowering plant in the family Apocynaceae, native to wet tropical areas of Táchira state, Venezuela. A scrambling subshrub, it is so named because it possesses a number of character traits often used to delimitate sections and even genera in related taxa.
