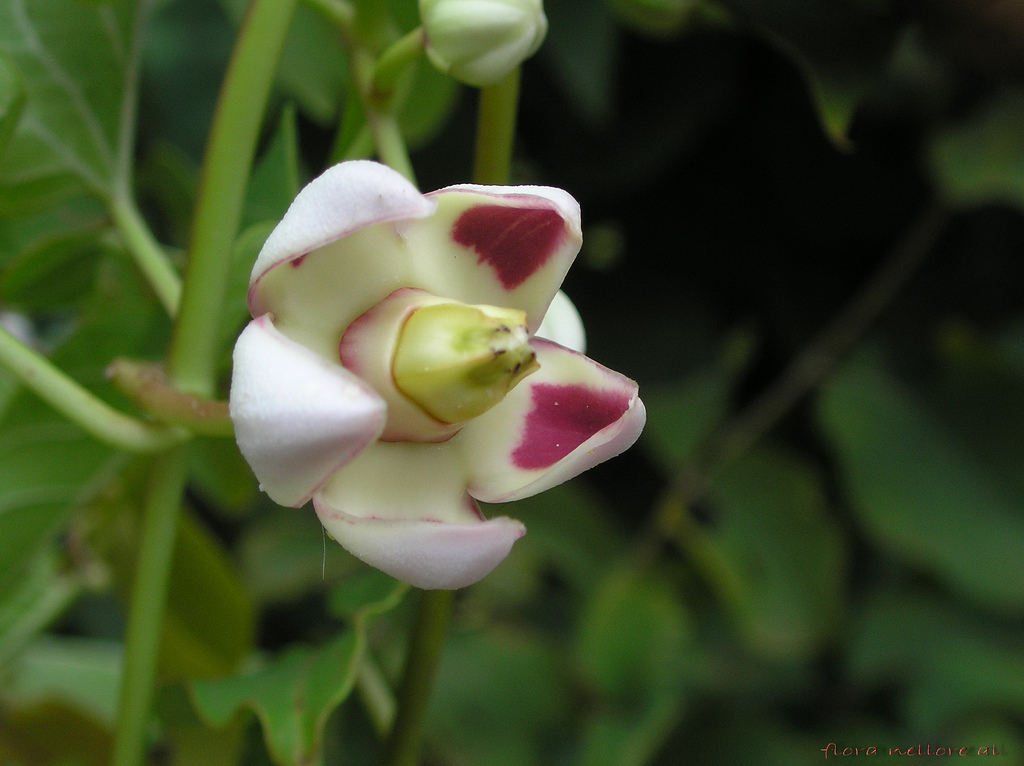

Scientific classification
- Kingdom: Plantae
- Clade: Embryophytes
- Clade: Tracheophytes
- Clade: Spermatophytes
- Clade: Angiosperms
- Clade: Eudicots
- Clade: Asterids
- Order: Gentianales
- Family: Apocynaceae
- Genus: Cynanchum
- Species: C. annularium

Binomial name
- Cynanchum annularium (Roxb.) Liede & Khanum

Synonyms
- List: Asclepias annularia Roxb.; Holostemma annularium (Roxb.) K.Schum.; Cynanchum annulare B.Heyne ex Wight; Gomphocarpus volubilis Buch.-Ham. ex Hook.f.; Holostemma ada-kodien Schult.; Holostemma brunonianum Royle; Holostemma rheedianum Spreng.; Sarcostemma annulare Roth

= Cynanchum annularium =

Species of plant

Cynanchum annularium is a species of climbing vine swallowwort. It is native from the Indian subcontinent to South China.
