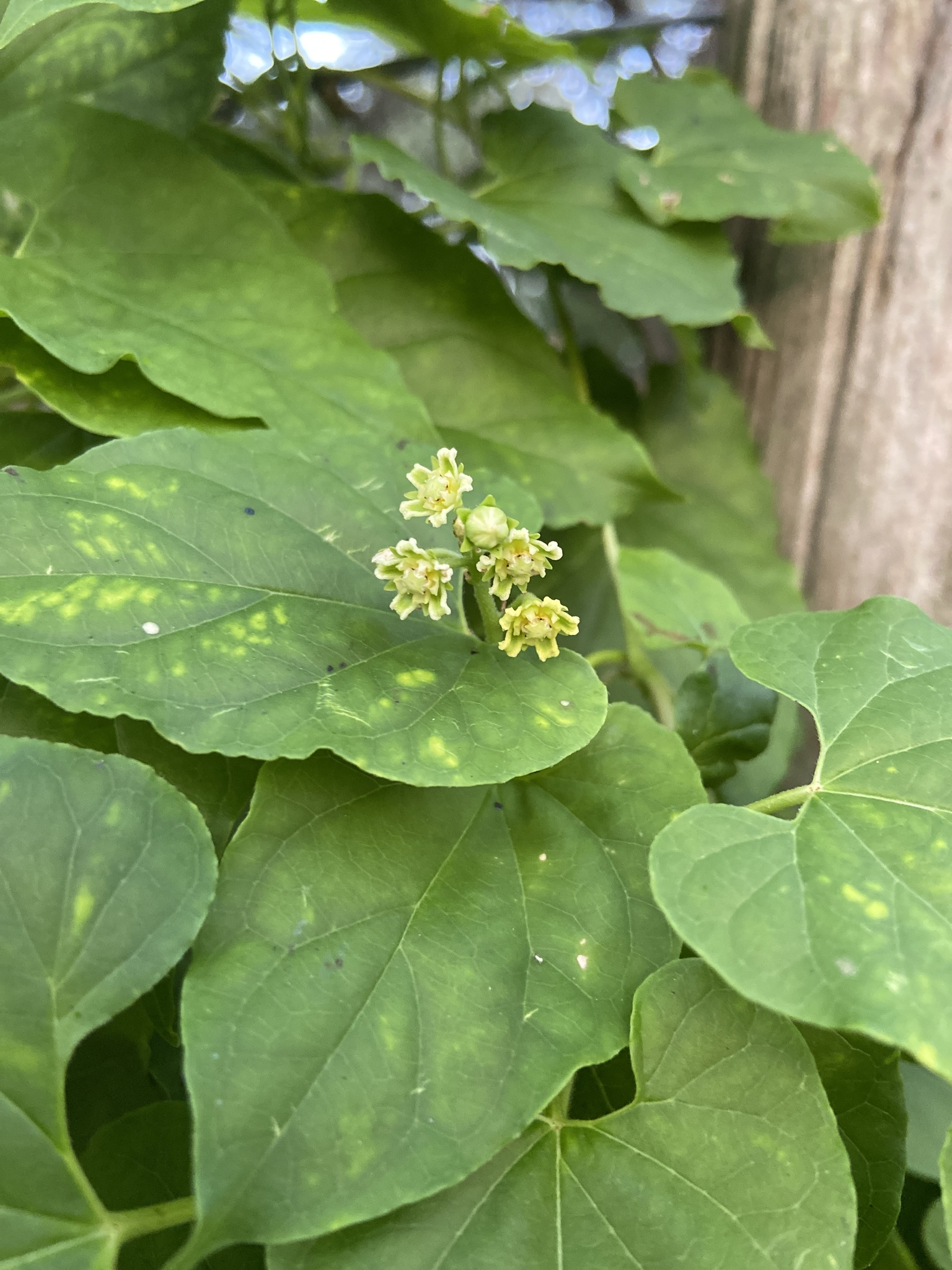

Scientific classification
- Kingdom: Plantae
- Clade: Embryophytes
- Clade: Tracheophytes
- Clade: Spermatophytes
- Clade: Angiosperms
- Clade: Eudicots
- Clade: Asterids
- Order: Gentianales
- Family: Apocynaceae
- Genus: Cynanchum
- Species: C. racemosum

Binomial name
- Cynanchum racemosum (Jacq.) Jacq.

= Cynanchum racemosum =

Species of flowering plant

Cynanchum racemosum, common name talayote, is a perennial vine that grows in Texas and Mexico. It is in the family Apocynaceae. It grows in forests and thickets and has greenish white or cream colored flowers. It grows to fifteen feet long. Leaves are heart shaped. It is deciduous. It is a host plant for various bees, butterflies, beetles, and other insects including soldier and monarch butterflies.
