= Metastelma arizonicum =

Scientific classification
- Kingdom: Plantae
- Clade: Tracheophytes
- Clade: Angiosperms
- Clade: Eudicots
- Clade: Asterids
- Order: Gentianales
- Family: Apocynaceae
- Genus: Metastelma
- Species: M. arizonicum

Binomial name
- Metastelma arizonicum A. Gray

Synonyms
- Cynanchum arizonicum (A.Gray) Shinners; Metastelma watsonianum Standl.

Species of plant

Metastelma arizonicum, synonym Cynanchum arizonicum, the Arizona swallow-wort or Arizona climbing milkweed, is a plant native to Arizona, New Mexico and Sonora. It is a twining, herbaceous vine with whitish to yellow flowers, growing on rocky slopes and in canyons of desert mountain ranges.
