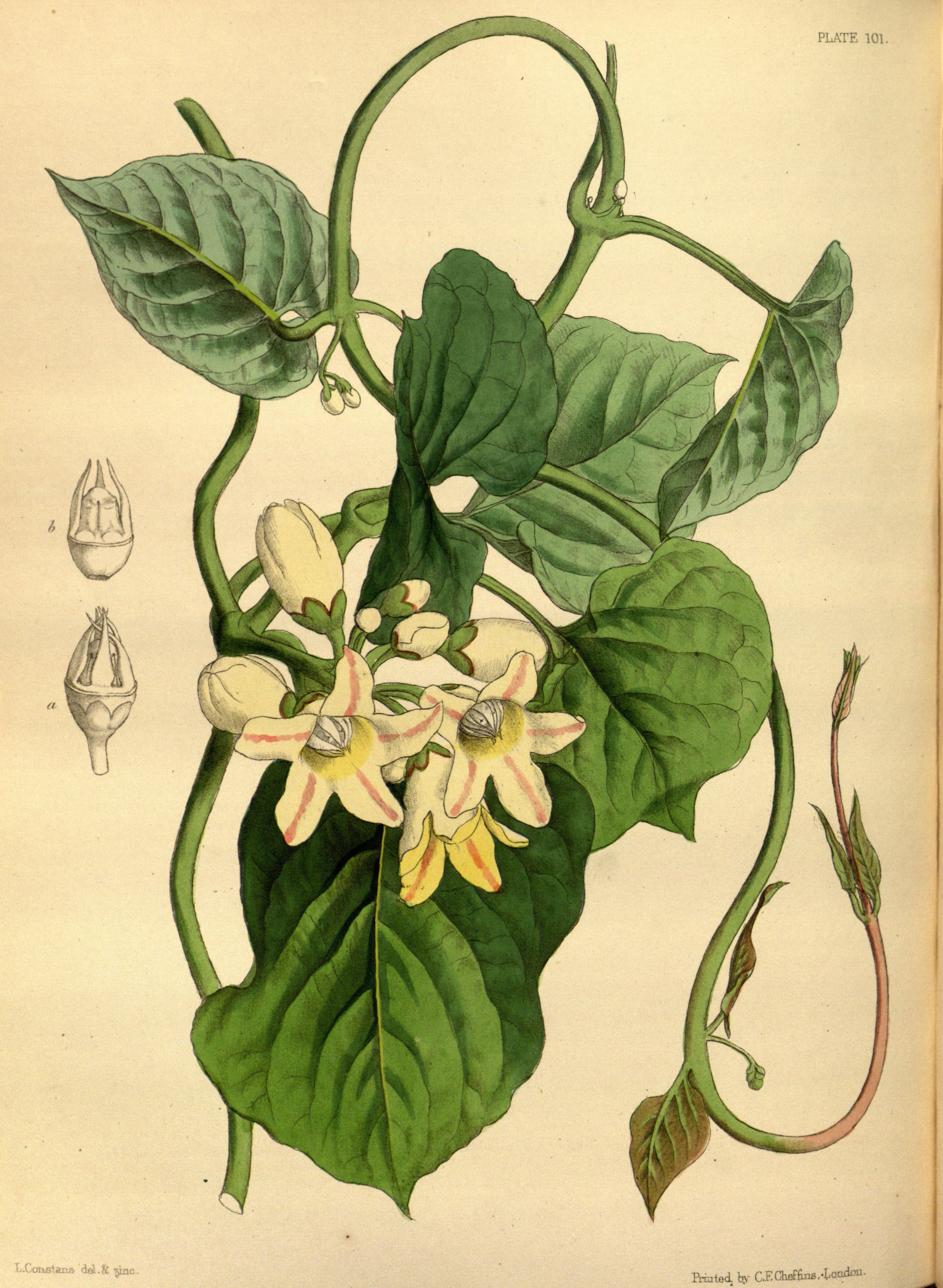
- Botanical drawing, 1853

Scientific classification
- Kingdom: Plantae
- Clade: Embryophytes
- Clade: Tracheophytes
- Clade: Spermatophytes
- Clade: Angiosperms
- Clade: Eudicots
- Clade: Asterids
- Order: Gentianales
- Family: Apocynaceae
- Subfamily: Asclepiadoideae
- Tribe: Asclepiadeae
- Genus: Cynanchum
- Species: C. pulchellum

Binomial name
- Cynanchum pulchellum (Wall.) Liede & Khanum

Synonyms
- Asclepias pulchella (Wall.) Roxb.; Oxystelma pulchellum (Wall.) D.Dietr.; Pergularia campanulata Buch.-Ham. ex Wall.; Raphistemma pulchellum (Roxb.) Wall.

= Cynanchum pulchellum =

Species of flowering plant

Cynanchum pulchellum is an Asian species of liana in the family Apocynaceae. Its known distribution includes: China (Guangxi), Thailand, India, Nepal, Sikkim, Laos, Peninsular Malaysia, Myanmar and Vietnam. Before 2016, it was the type species of the genus Raphistemma.
