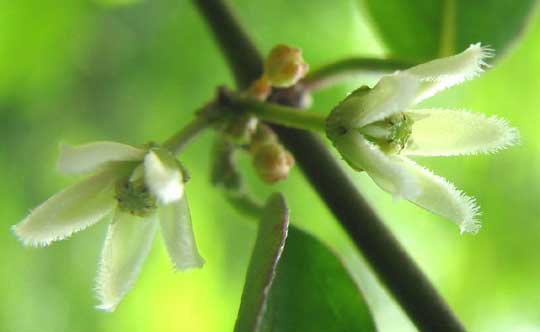
- Metastelma schlechtendalii

Scientific classification
- Kingdom: Plantae
- Clade: Tracheophytes
- Clade: Angiosperms
- Clade: Eudicots
- Clade: Asterids
- Order: Gentianales
- Family: Apocynaceae
- Subfamily: Asclepiadoideae
- Tribe: Asclepiadeae
- Genus: Metastelma; R.Br.

= Metastelma =

Genus of plants

Metastelma is a genus of plant in the family Apocynaceae first described in 1810.

Species

1. Metastelma angustifolium
2. Metastelma aristatum
3. Metastelma arizonicum
4. Metastelma barbigerum
5. Metastelma blodgettii
6. Metastelma brachymischum
7. Metastelma burchellii
8. Metastelma calcicola
9. Metastelma californicum
10. Metastelma calycinum
11. Metastelma chimantense
12. Metastelma costatum
13. Metastelma cuneatum
14. Metastelma diffusum
15. Metastelma dorrii
16. Metastelma eliasianum
17. Metastelma exasperatum
18. Metastelma fiebrigii
19. Metastelma filiforme
20. Metastelma giuliettianum
21. Metastelma guanchezii
22. Metastelma harleyi
23. Metastelma hirtellum
24. Metastelma huberi
25. Metastelma lanceolatum
26. Metastelma latifolium
27. Metastelma leptophyllum
28. Metastelma liesnerianum
29. Metastelma longicoronatum
30. Metastelma macropodum
31. Metastelma mathewsii
32. Metastelma mexicanum
33. Metastelma microgynostegia
34. Metastelma minutiflorum
35. Metastelma mirifolium
36. Metastelma miserum
37. Metastelma myrianthum
38. Metastelma myrtifolium
39. Metastelma nubicola
40. Metastelma occidentale
41. Metastelma oranense
42. Metastelma ovalifolium
43. Metastelma palmeri
44. Metastelma paralias
45. Metastelma paraquense
46. Metastelma parviflorum
47. Metastelma pauciflorum
48. Metastelma pedunculare
49. Metastelma peruvianum
50. Metastelma pringlei
51. Metastelma pubescens
52. Metastelma pubipetalum
53. Metastelma purpurascens
54. Metastelma rariflorum
55. Metastelma rugosum
56. Metastelma schaffneri
57. Metastelma schlechtendalii
58. Metastelma schlechteri
59. Metastelma sepicola
60. Metastelma sepium
61. Metastelma stenomeres
62. Metastelma stipitatum
63. Metastelma strictum
64. Metastelma subcordatum
65. Metastelma thalamosiphon
66. Metastelma thysanotum
67. Metastelma triodontum
68. Metastelma tubatum
69. Metastelma turneri
70. Metastelma warmingii
71. Metastelma yucatanense

formerly included

1. M. abietoides, syn of Hemipogon abietoides
2. M. acerosum, syn of Hemipogon hemipogonoides
3. M. acuminatum, syn of Gonioanthela axillaris
4. M. aemulans, syn of Cynanchum aemulans
5. M. anegadense, syn of Cynanchum anegadense
6. M. aphyllum, syn of Orthosia scoparia
7. M. atrorubens, syn of Cynanchum atrorubens
8. M. atrovirens, syn of Cynanchum atrovirens
9. M. australe, syn of Tweedia australis
10. M. bahamense, syn of Cynanchum bahamense
11. M. barbatipetalum, syn of Peplonia organensis
12. M. berteroanum, syn of Tassadia berteroanum
13. M. boldinghii, syn of Cynanchum boldinghii
14. M. bonplandianum, syn of Orthosia bonplandiana
15. M. brachystephanum, syn of Cynanchum brachystephanum
16. M. bracteolatum, syn of Petalostelma bracteolatum
17. M. calcaratum, syn of Petalostelma calcaratum
18. M. crassiusculum, syn of Cynanchum crassiusculum
19. M. domingense, syn of Cynanchum domingense
20. M. dusenii, syn of Orthosia dusenii
21. M. eggersii, syn of Cynanchum eggersii
22. M. ephedroides, syn of Cynanchum ephedroides
23. M. eulaxiflorum, syn of Jobinia eulaxiflora
24. M. fawcettii, syn of Cynanchum fawcettii
25. M. freemanii, syn of Cynanchum freemanii
26. M. fusculum, syn of Astephanus fusculus
27. M. glaberrimum, syn of Orthosia glaberrima
28. M. glabrius, syn of Cynanchum glabrius
29. M. gracile, syn of Cynanchum gracile
30. M. guilleminianum, syn of Orthosia guilleminiana
31. M. harrisii, syn of Cynanchum harrisii
32. M. hartii, syn of Cynanchum hartii
33. M. hatschbachii, syn of Hemipogon hatschbachii
34. M. hemipogonoides, syn of Hemipogon hemipogonoides
35. M. hernandifolium, syn of Jobinia connivens
36. M. hilairanum, syn of Peplonia organensis
37. M. inaguense, syn of Cynanchum inaguense
38. M. latipes, syn of Orthosia latipes
39. M. leptocladum, syn of Cynanchum leptocladum
40. M. linearifolium, syn of Amphistelma linearifolium
41. M. longisepalum, syn of Ditassa longisepala
42. M. martianum, syn of Petalostelma martianum
43. M. melanthum, syn of Orthosia scoparia
44. M. monense, syn of Cynanchum monense
45. M. mucronatum, syn of Ditassa albonerva
46. M. northropiae, syn of Cynanchum northropiae
47. M. obscurum, syn of Ditassa obscura
48. M. odoratum, syn of Peplonia axillaris
49. M. organense, syn of Peplonia organensis
50. M. pallidum, syn of Orthosia guilleminiana
51. M. palustre, syn of Seutera angustifolia
52. M. penicillatum, syn of Cynanchum penicillatum
53. M. penicillatum var. brachystephanum, syn of Cynanchum brachystephanum
54. M. picardae, syn of Cynanchum picardae
55. M. priorii, syn of Cynanchum priorii
56. M. quitense, syn of Cynanchum quitense
57. M. readii, syn of Cynanchum readii
58. M. retinaculatum, syn of Orthosia guilleminiana
59. M. riedelii, syn of Peplonia riedelii
60. M. robertii, syn of Petalostelma robertii
61. M. rodriguezii, syn of Cynanchum rodriguezii
62. M. rotundifolium, syn of Ditassa rotundifolia
63. M. rubens, syn of Orthosia rubens
64. M. rupicola, syn of Cynanchum rupicola
65. M. salinarum, syn of Seutera angustifolia
66. M. scoparium, syn of Orthosia scoparia
67. M. sessilifolium, syn of Marsdenia sessilifolia
68. M. spruceanum, syn of Cynanchum spruceanum
69. M. stenoglossum, syn of Cynanchum stenoglossum
70. M. stenolobum, syn of Tassadia berteroanum
71. M. steudelianum, syn of Blepharodon pictum
72. M. tomentosum, syn of Ditassa tomentosa
73. M. trifurcatum, syn of Cynanchum argentinense
74. M. tylophoroides, syn of Cynanchum tylophoroides
75. M. urbanianum, syn of Cynanchum urbanianum
76. M. urceolatum, syn of Peplonia riedelii
77. M. virgatum, syn of Orthosia virgata
