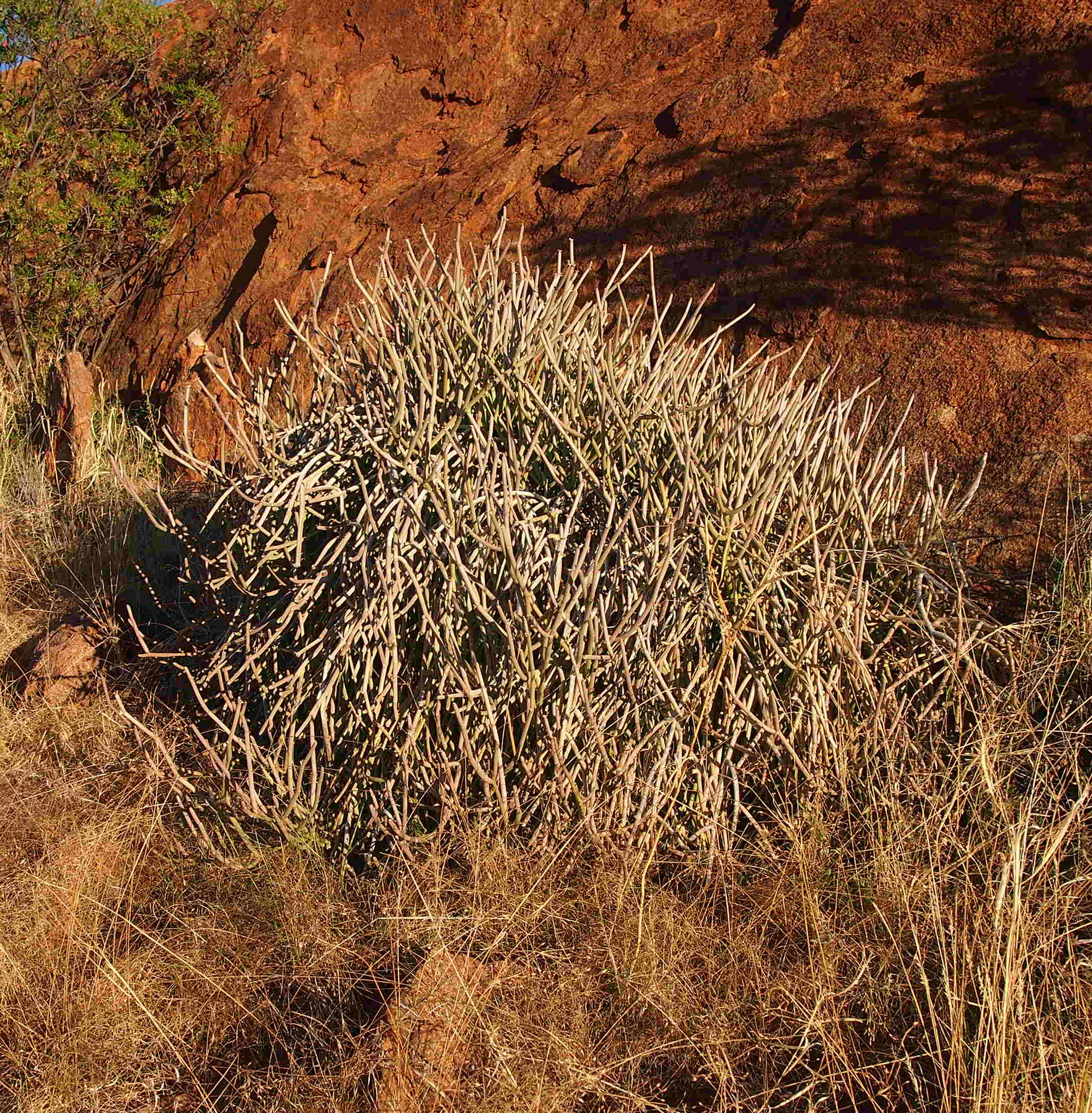

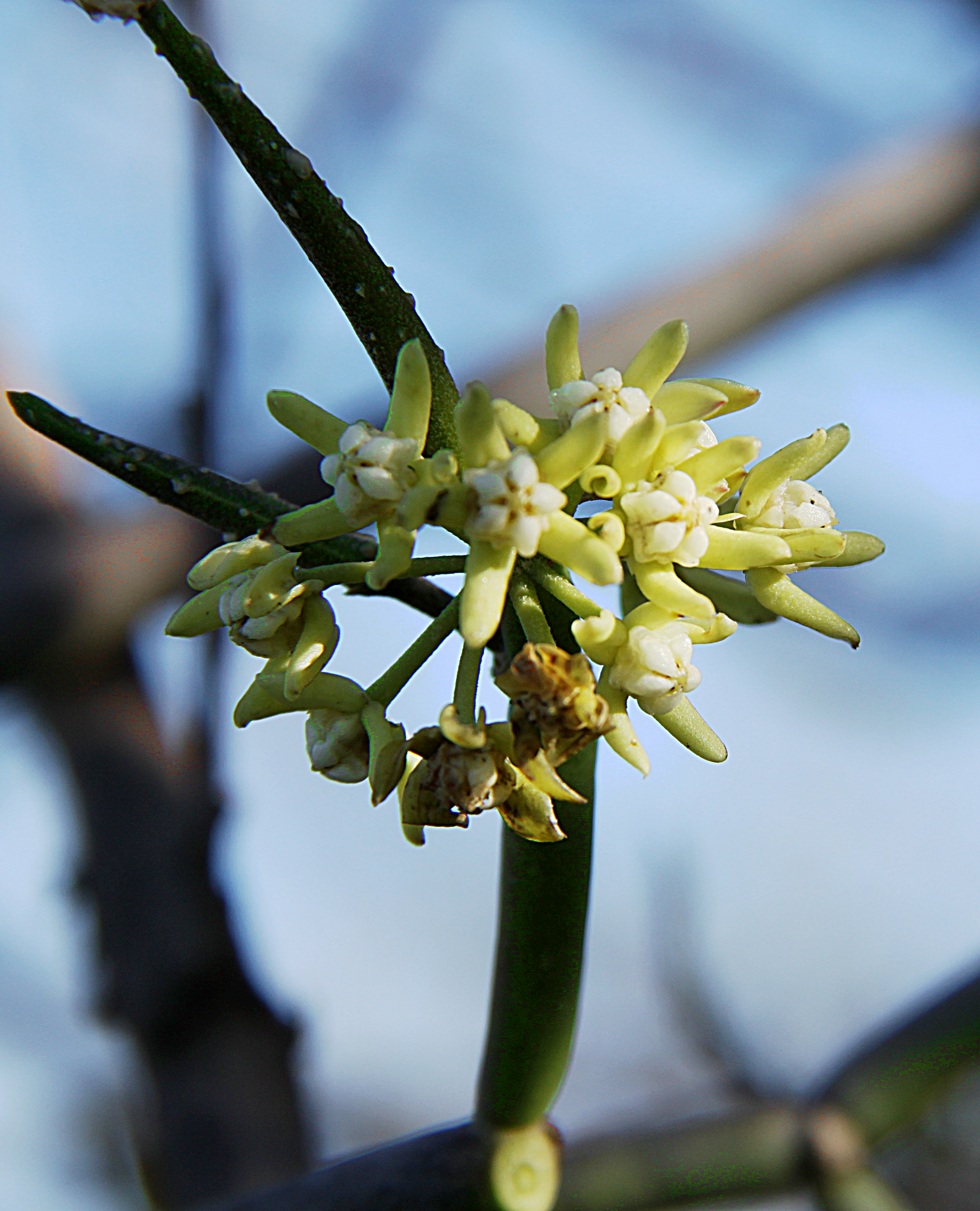

Scientific classification
- Kingdom: Plantae
- Clade: Tracheophytes
- Clade: Angiosperms
- Clade: Eudicots
- Clade: Asterids
- Order: Gentianales
- Family: Apocynaceae
- Genus: Cynanchum
- Species: C. viminale

Binomial name
- Cynanchum viminale (L.) L.

Synonyms
- Asclepias aphylla Thunb.; Cynanchum aphyllum (Schult.) Schltr.; Cynanchum aphyllum L.; Monostemma aphyllum (Schult.) Turcz.; Sarcostemma aphyllum Schult.; Sarcostemma viminale (L.) R.Br.; Euphorbia viminalis L.

= Cynanchum viminale =

Species of plant

Cynanchum viminale is a leafless succulent plant in the family Apocynaceae. The species is native to West Africa, the Indian Ocean and Western Pacific region. The species' natural range extends from South Africa throughout much of Africa and the Middle East to India, Indochina, Southern China, Indomalaya and into Meganesia. The species is also found on several Indian Oceans islands including Mauritius, Réunion and the Seychelles.

In keeping with its wide distribution, the species is known by a range of common names, including caustic-creeper, caustic bush, sacred soma, soma, rou shan hu, Rapunzel plant, liane calle and kitupa.

== Description ==
Cynanchum viminale is a leafless succulent plant with cylindrical, green photosynthetic stems. The plant may grow as a shrub or a scandent vine. The stems produce copious amounts of milky exudate when broken. This exudate is caustic in nature and can cause burns if it contacts human skin. The plant produces small white flowers in clusters. Flowers are followed by long pods which produce numerous seeds with silky plumes that aid in wind dispersal. The environmental range of the species is very broad, extending from rainforest margins and monsoon forests to arid deserts.

Toxicity appears to be variable, even locally. The plant is known to cause poisoning and death in livestock.

== Taxonomy ==
The taxonomic status of this species is controversial.

The genus Sarcostemma has been shown to be nested within the genus Cynanchum, and Sarcostemma was put into synonymy with Cynanchum in 2002. Thus, Sarcostemma viminale is correctly known as Cynanchum viminale. However this change has not been accepted by all taxonomists and the name Sarcostemma remains in use by a minority, despite later genetic evidence.

The species has numerous subspecies, though precisely how many remains in dispute, and this is further complicated by the difficulty in definitively distinguishing C. viminale from closely related species.

== Uses ==
=== As a food ===
In Kenya, it is considered quality forage; in Somalia and South Africa the stems are eaten by humans, either raw or cooked.

=== Medicinal ===
The plant has been used as a traditional medicine to treat a range of conditions, including sores and wounds, smallpox, eye infections, diarrhoea, intestinal and skin parasites and insufficient milk production. The aerial parts, roots and latex of the plant are all used for medicine, and the method of use varies from ingestion of plant parts, drinking a decoction of the plant, application of the sap to affected parts, exposure to smoke from the burning plant or placing patients onto bedding made from the plant. Care is usually required because of the poisonous and caustic nature of the sap, however in some locales toxicity is considered low, at least for part of the year.
