= Jacob Gijsbert Boerlage =

Dutch botanist

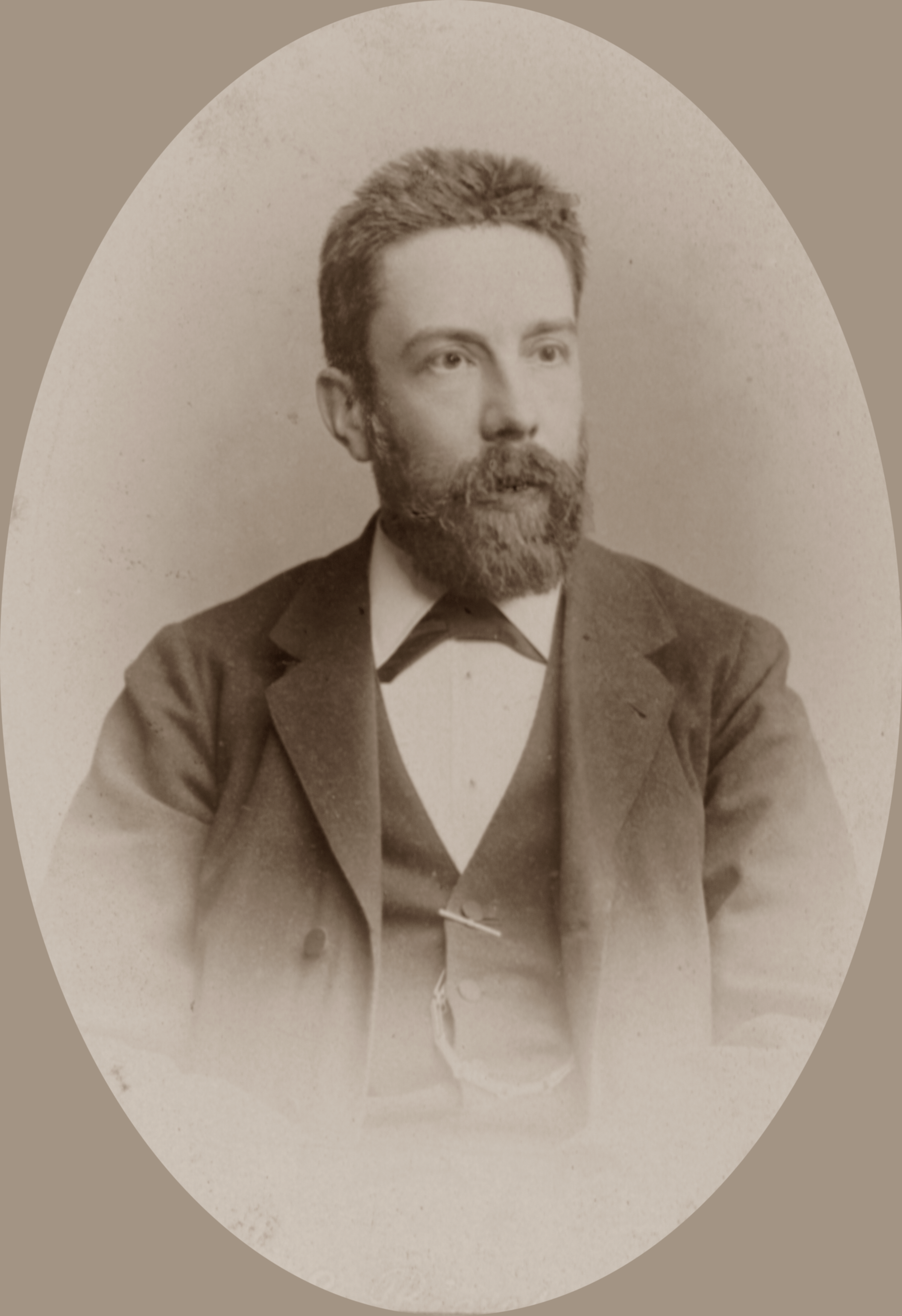
- Jacob Gijsbert Boerlage (presumably)
- Born: 18 November 1849; Uithoorn, Netherlands
- Died: 25 September 1900 (aged 50); Ternate, Indonesia
- Education: Leiden University
- Scientific career
- Fields: Botany
- Author abbrev. (botany): Boerl.

Jacob Gijsbert Boerlage (18 November 1849 – 25 September 1900) was a Dutch botanist, who worked principally at the National Herbarium in Brussels.

== Biography ==
Boerlage was born in Uithoorn, in the Netherlands on 18 November 1849. He received his doctoral degree (1875) from Leiden University. Initially he worked as a teacher in the Hogere Burgerschool in Amsterdam and Dordrecht. In 1879 he began working at the National Herbarium in Brussels, which in 1999 merged with National Herbarium of the Netherlands based in Leiden. In 1880 he became the herbarium's Curator. He married shortly after becoming Curator and was later appointed as deputy director. In 1896, he became the deputy director of the Bogor Botanical Gardens (then called the Buitenzorg Botanical Gardens) in Indonesia. He died while on a scientific expedition to the coast of Ternate. He was elected corresponding member of the Royal Netherlands Academy of Arts and Sciences in 1900.

== Legacy ==
He is the authority for at least 564 taxa including: IPNI. List of plant names with authority Boerl..
