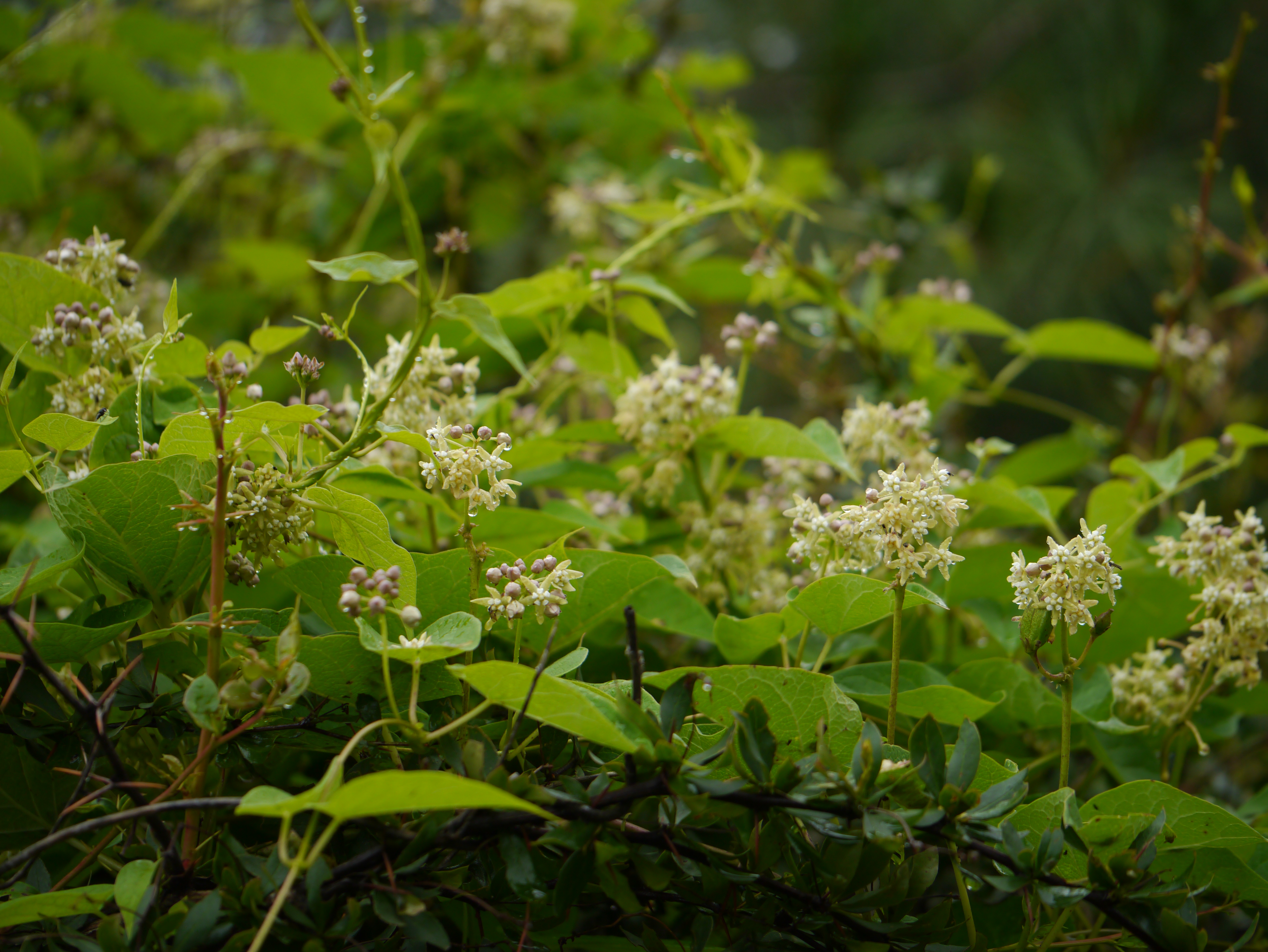

Scientific classification
- Kingdom: Plantae
- Clade: Tracheophytes
- Clade: Angiosperms
- Clade: Eudicots
- Clade: Asterids
- Order: Gentianales
- Family: Apocynaceae
- Genus: Vincetoxicum
- Species: V. auriculatum

Binomial name
- Vincetoxicum auriculatum (Royle ex Wight) Kuntze

Synonyms
- Cynanchum auriculatum Royle ex Wight; Cynanchum saccatum W.T.Wang; Diploglossum auriculatum (Royle ex Wight) Meisn.; Endotropis auriculata (Royle ex Wight) Decne.

= Vincetoxicum auriculatum =

Species of plant

Vincetoxicum auriculatum, synonym Cynanchum auriculatum, is a species of climbing vine. Its Chinese name is niu pi xiao [ 牛皮消 ] (leather eater). V. auriculatum flowers between June and August; fruiting from August all the way to December.

== Distribution and habitat ==
Vincetoxicum auriculatum is native to Asian temperate and tropical regions; found in China (in Sichuan, Xizang, and Yunnan provinces), Bhutan, Nepal, and the northern parts of Pakistan and India (it is also native to Kashmir). Its habitat is mountainous shrubland terrain, at elevations from 2800 to 3600 meters.

== Studies ==
Ethanol extracts derived from roots of V. auriculatum are being studied for use in anti-cancer medicine; one preliminary study found extracts to have some cytotoxic effects on certain human tumor cell lines. The tests were conducted, both in vitro and in vivo, on both human subjects, and mice.

Penupogenin [27526-87-0] & Qingyangshengenin [84745-94-8] are steroidal aglycones isolated from the roots of Cynanchum auriculatum.
