= Ping Tao Li =

Chinese botanist (born 1936)

Ping Tao Li (Chinese: 李秉滔; pinyin: Lǐ Bǐngtāo; born 1936) is a Chinese botanist who co-authored articles in the Flora of China.

== Publications ==
- Loganiaceae, (co-author A J M Leeuwenberg) in Wu, Z. & Raven, P. Eds. Flora of China, Vol. 15, (1996), Science Press, Beijing, and Missouri Botanical Garden Press, St. Louis, USA.
