= John Jacob Lavranos =

Greek/South African insurance broker and botanist

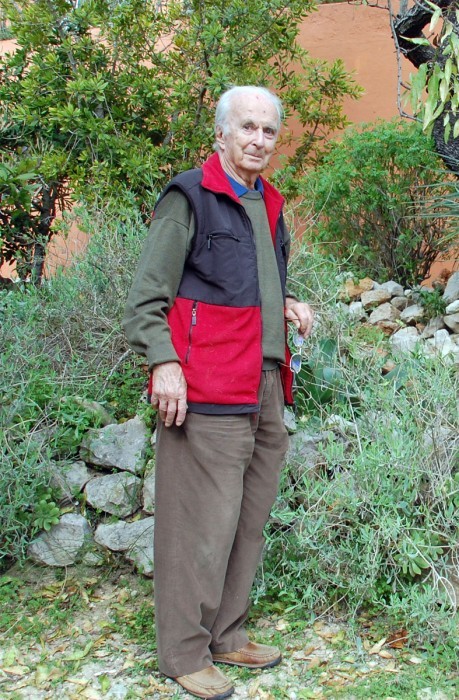
John Lavranos in his garden in Loulé, Portugal

On the road down from the Mait Escarpment north of Erigavo, Somalia, 1969

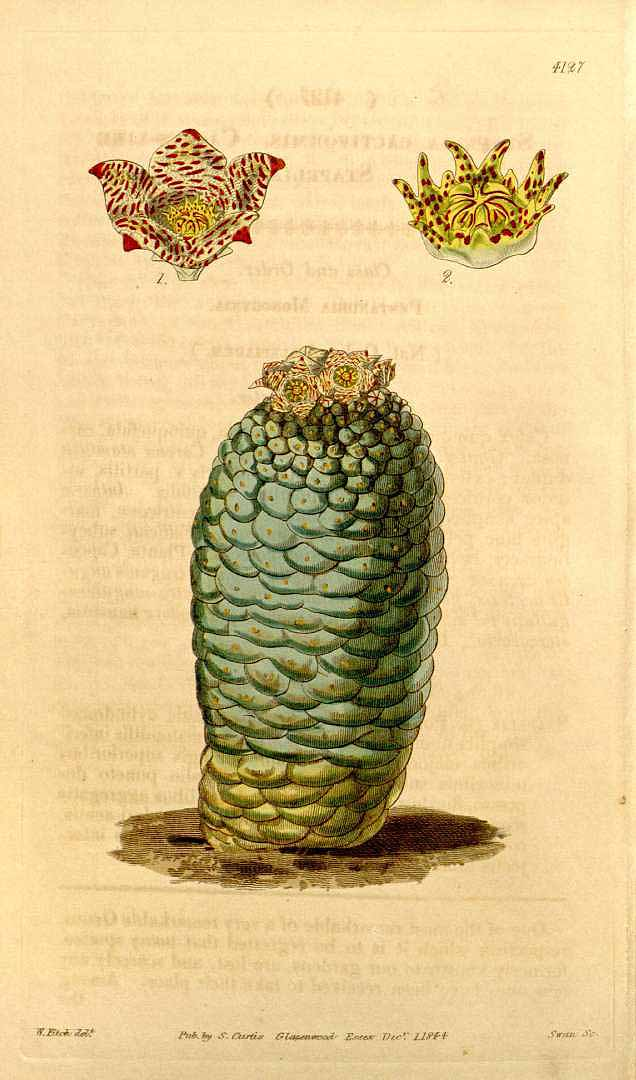
Lavrania cactiformis

John Jacob Lavranos (29 March 1926, in Corfu – 1 February 2018, in Portugal) was a Greek/South African insurance broker and botanist, with a special interest in succulents. The standard author abbreviation Lavranos is used to indicate this person as the author when citing a botanical name. He scientifically described almost 300 new species of plants, and a number have been named in his honor.

== Early life ==
John's mother, Lily, was half Swiss/German, and lived for most of her married life in the family house in Chlomos in Corfu. She and her husband Philip cared for John and his younger brother, Max, saw the occupation of Corfu during WWII, and lived through the bombings by Italians, Germans, British and Americans, only to be plunged immediately into the Greek Civil War of 1946 to 1949.

At the end of the War having served in the Greek Navy, John studied economics and law at the University of Athens, earning a B.Sc. (Econ.) degree in 1948. He arrived in South Africa in September 1952 with his first wife, Helen, and started work as an insurance broker. In 1967 he studied for a B.Sc. in Natural Science through the University of South Africa, and the following year enrolled at the University of Witwatersrand for an M.Sc. degree in botany and geography.

== Botanical work and later life ==
Over a period of more than 50 years, Lavranos undertook numerous visits to remote regions in southern Arabia, Somalia and Socotra, Kenya and Tanzania, Mozambique, Madagascar, Reunion Island, Mauritius, Canary Islands, Greece, and in his final years, the southwestern United States, Mexico, and Chile. His trips through South Africa included Namaqualand, Mpumalanga, and the Richtersveld. He discovered and described many new species of succulent plants, collaborating with organisations such as the National Museum of Natural History (France), the Institute of Tropical Botany of Florence, Kew Gardens, Jardin Exotique de Monaco, and the Missouri Botanical Garden. His contributions were published mainly in the 'Cactus & Succulent Journal', and he confined himself to Asclepiadaceae, Pelargoniums, Aloes and other succulents. His collection of pressed specimens numbered some 32 000, and he described or co-described approximately 180 taxa.

He settled in Loulé, a city near Faro in the Algarve region of southern Portugal in 1995 and donated most of his plants to the Gibraltar Botanic Gardens. Maintaining his passion for plants, he continued an active correspondence with other botanists, often setting aside time for succulent enthusiasts.

If the last century of contributions to our knowledge of succulents plants could be compared to a large greenhouse, then John Lavranos would be one of the supporting poles near the center. Not only has he found so many of Mother Nature's well hidden and most beautiful succulent treasures, but he has shared the resulting knowledge and material with utmost generosity. The combination of skills needed to do what he has done so far is only rarely found in a single human, and more than once have I heard the word genius used where John was discussed. But please note the emphasis in the last sentence, because at 80, John still regularly goes exploring in Africa, Madagascar and the Yemen! No doubt this Pablo Picasso of the succulent plant world will keep on doing his thing for more than another decade. So this issue, dedicated to John, is definitely no premature homage, but rather a long overdue applause of respect and appreciation for all that he has contributed... so far.

— Gerhard Marx in Vol 78-2 of 'Cactus and Succulent Journal' (March–April 2006)

He is commemorated in the genus Lavrania in the family Apocynaceae, Aloe lavranosii Reynolds, Eriospermum lavranosii P.L.Perry, Caralluma lavranii Rauh & Wertel, Sarcocaulon lavranii Halda, Phagnalon lavranosii Qaiser & Lack Aloe lavranosii is from Yemen and is unusual in being hairy with yellow-green flowers.

Crassula susannae was named for Suzanne Lavranos, the second wife of John Lavranos. Caralluma mireillae Lavranos, was named after John's third wife, Mireille, who died in 2014, and whom he had met in Djibouti. She was very supportive of his botanical explorations and often accompanied him. All three of John's marriages were childless.

John was known to be pragmatic, forthright, precise, energetic, and with a lively sense of humour. His knowledge of botany and geology was formidable, and this extended to climatology, geography, astronomy, history and music–he was an accomplished pianist earlier in his life. Despite being an agnostic, his Biblical knowledge was extensive. He was a polyglot and comfortable in Ancient Greek and Latin, and fluent in Greek, English, German, French, Italian, Spanish, Portuguese, Arabic and Afrikaans. He succumbed in Loulé, Portugal following a stroke.
