= Tylophora =

Former genus of flowering plants

Tylophora is a former genus of climbing plants or vines, first described as a genus in 1810. The genus was originally erected by Robert Brown for four species he described in Australia. It was synonymized with Vincetoxicum in 2018, a decision accepted by Plants of the World Online as of February 2023.

== Former species ==
Species have been moved to other genera, mainly Vincetoxicum, but also Gongronema, Heterostemma, Lygisma, Sarcolobus, Secamone, Stephanotis (syn. Wattakaka), and Streptocaulon. Former species include:

- T. albiflora, syn. of Vincetoxicum sublanceolatum f. albiflorum
- T. aristolochioides, syn. of Vincetoxicum aristolochioides
- T. barbata, syn. of Vincetoxicum barbatum
- T. belostemma, syn. of Vincetoxicum belostemma
- T. benthamii, syn. of Vincetoxicum polyanthum
- T. caffra, syn. of Vincetoxicum caffrum
- T. calcarata, syn. of Heterostemma acuminatum
- T. cameroonica, syn. of Vincetoxicum cameroonicum
- T. capparidifolia, syn. of Vincetoxicum capparidifolium
- T. crassifolia, syn. of Vincetoxicum crassifolium
- T. cuspidata, syn. of Vincetoxicum flexuosum var. flexuosum
- T. hainanensis, syn. of Lygisma inflexum
- T. japonica, syn. of Vincetoxicum sieboldii
- T. juventas, syn. of Streptocaulon juventas
- T. liebiana, syn. of Vincetoxicum liebianum
- T. linearis, syn. of Vincetoxicum forsteri
- T. lutescens, syn. of Vincetoxicum indicum var. indicum
- T. macrantha Hance, syn. of Stephanotis volubilis
- T. minutiflora Woodson, syn. of Secamone minutiflora
- T. ovata, syn. of Vincetoxicum hirsutum
- T. oblonga, syn. of Vincetoxicum oblongum
- T. paniculata, syn. of Vincetoxicum paniculatum
- T. pauciflora, syn. of Vincetoxicum bracteatum
- T. rupicola, syn. of Vincetoxicum rupicola
- T. samoensis, syn. of Heterostemma samoense
- T. sublanceolata, syn. of Vincetoxicum sublanceolatum
- T. sulphurea, syn. of Sarcolobus retusus
- T. tanakae, syn. of Vincetoxicum tanakae
- T. urceolata, syn. of Vincetoxicum anomalum
- T. villosa Blume, syn. of Vincetoxicum villosum
- T. wallichii, syn. of Gongronema wallichii
- T. woollsii, syn. of Vincetoxicum woollsii
