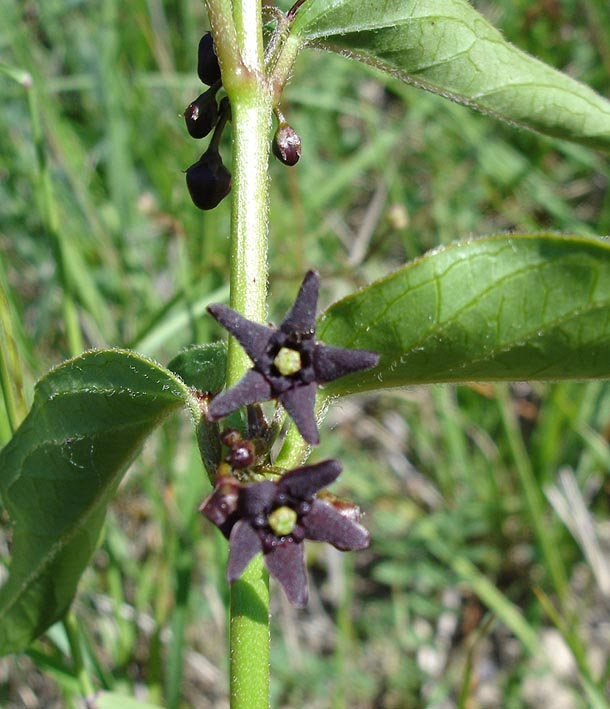
- Vincetoxicum nigrum

Scientific classification
- Kingdom: Plantae
- Clade: Embryophytes
- Clade: Tracheophytes
- Clade: Angiosperms
- Clade: Eudicots
- Clade: Asterids
- Order: Gentianales
- Family: Apocynaceae
- Subfamily: Asclepiadoideae
- Tribe: Asclepiadeae
- Genus: Vincetoxicum; Wolf 1776 not Walter 1788

Type species
- Vincetoxicum hirundinaria Medik.

Synonyms
- List: Alexitoxicon St.-Lag.; Amblyoglossum Turcz.; Antitoxicum Pobed.; Belostemma Wall. ex Wight; Biondia Schltr.; Blyttia Arn.; Diploglossum Meisn.; Diplostigma K.Schum.; Goydera Liede; Haplostemma Endl.; Henrya Hemsl., nom. illeg.; Henryastrum Happ; Homolostyles Wall. ex Wight; Homostyles Wall. ex Hook.f., not validly publ.; Hoyopsis H.Lév.; Hybanthera Endl.; Iphisia Wight & Arn.; Ischnostemma King & Gamble; Merrillanthus Chun & Tsiang; Microstephanus N.E.Br.; Nanostelma Baill.; Neohenrya Hemsl., nom. superfl.; Oncostemma K.Schum.; Pentabothra Hook.f.; Pentastelma Y.Tsiang & P.T.Li; Pleurostelma Baill.; Podostelma K.Schum.; Pseudopentatropis Costantin; Pycnostelma Bunge ex Decne.; Rhodostegiella (Pobed.) C.Y.Wu & D.Z.Li; Rhyncharrhena F.Muell.; Sphaerocodon Benth.; Spirella Costantin; Tylophora R.Br.; Tylophoropsis N.E.Br.; Vincetoxicopsis Costantin

= Vincetoxicum =

Genus of plants

Vincetoxicum is a genus of plants in the family Apocynaceae. Although the species in Vincetoxicum have sometimes been included in Cynanchum, chemical and molecular evidence shows that Vincetoxicum is more closely related to Tylophora, now included in Vincetoxicum. The generic name means "poison-beater" in Botanical Latin because of the plants' supposed antidotal effects against snakebite.

== Species ==
Species accepted by the Plants of the World Online as of 2025:

- Vincetoxicum adnatum (Bakh.f.) Meve & Liede
- Vincetoxicum afrum (Meisn.) Kuntze
- Vincetoxicum ambiguum Maxim.
- Vincetoxicum amplexicaule Siebold & Zucc.
- Vincetoxicum angustifolium (Schltr.) Meve & Liede
- Vincetoxicum anomalum (N.E.Br.) Meve & Liede
- Vincetoxicum anthopotamicum (Hand.-Mazz.) Meve & Liede
- Vincetoxicum apiculatum (K.Schum.) Meve & Liede
- Vincetoxicum arachnoideum (Goyder) Meve & Liede
- Vincetoxicum arenicola (Merr.) Meve & Liede
- Vincetoxicum aristolochioides (Miq.) Franch. & Sav.
- Vincetoxicum arnottianum (Wight) Wight
- Vincetoxicum ascyrifolium Franch. & Sav.
- Vincetoxicum assadii Zaeifi
- Vincetoxicum atratum (Bunge) C.Morren & Decne.
- Vincetoxicum augustinianum (Hemsl.) Meve & Liede
- Vincetoxicum auriculatum (Royle ex Wight) Kuntze
- Vincetoxicum auritum (Tsiang & P.T.Li) Meve, H.H.Kong & Liede
- Vincetoxicum austrokiusianum (Koidz.) Kitag.
- Vincetoxicum badium (E.Mey.) Meve & Liede
- Vincetoxicum balakrishnanii (P.M.Salim & J.Mathew) Kottaim.
- Vincetoxicum barbatum (R.Br.) Kuntze
- Vincetoxicum belostemma (Benth.) Kuntze
- Vincetoxicum biglandulosum (Endl.) Kuntze
- Vincetoxicum bilobatum (P.I.Forst.) Meve & Liede
- Vincetoxicum biondioides (W.T.Wang) C.Y.Wu & D.Z.Li
- Vincetoxicum brachystelmoides (P.I.Forst.) Liede
- Vincetoxicum bracteatum (Thunb.) Meve & Liede
- Vincetoxicum brassii (P.I.Forst.) Meve & Liede
- Vincetoxicum brevipes (Turcz.) Meve & Liede
- Vincetoxicum brownii (Hayata) Meve & Liede
- Vincetoxicum cambodiense Meve & Liede
- Vincetoxicum cameroonicum (N.E.Br.) Meve & Liede
- Vincetoxicum canescens (Willd.) Decne.
- Vincetoxicum capparidifolium (Wight & Arn.) Kuntze
- Vincetoxicum cardiostephanum (Rech.f.) Rech.f.
- Vincetoxicum carnosum (R.Br.) Benth.
- Vincetoxicum cernuum (Decne.) Meve & Liede
- Vincetoxicum chekiangense (M.Cheng) C.Y.Wu & D.Z.Li
- Vincetoxicum chinense S.Moore
- Vincetoxicum chingtungense (Tsiang & P.T.Li) Meve & Liede
- Vincetoxicum christineae (P.I.Forst.) Liede
- Vincetoxicum cinerascens (R.Br.) Meve & Liede
- Vincetoxicum cissoides (Blume) Kuntze
- Vincetoxicum clemensiae (Schltr.) Meve & Liede
- Vincetoxicum coddii (Bullock) Meve & Liede
- Vincetoxicum coloratum (C.T.White) Meve & Liede
- Vincetoxicum confusum Meve & Liede
- Vincetoxicum congolanum (Baill.) Meve & Liede
- Vincetoxicum conspicuum (N.E.Br.) Meve & Liede
- Vincetoxicum cordatum (R.Br. ex Schult.) Meve & Liede
- Vincetoxicum cordifolium (Thwaites) Kuntze
- Vincetoxicum coriaceum (Schltr.) Meve & Liede
- Vincetoxicum costantinianum (Tsiang) Meve & Liede
- Vincetoxicum crassifolium (Zipp. ex Decne.) Kuntze
- Vincetoxicum crassipes (M.G.Gilbert & P.T.Li) Meve & Liede
- Vincetoxicum creticum Browicz
- Vincetoxicum cycleoides (Tsiang) Meve & Liede
- Vincetoxicum dahomense (K.Schum.) Meve & Liede
- Vincetoxicum dalatense (S.Moore) Meve & Liede
- Vincetoxicum dalzellii (Hook.f.) Kuntze
- Vincetoxicum darvasicum B.Fedtsch.
- Vincetoxicum deltoideum Kuntze
- Vincetoxicum dionysiense Mouterde
- Vincetoxicum diplostigma Meve & Liede
- Vincetoxicum doianum (Koidz.) Kitag.
- Vincetoxicum dorgelonis (Bakh.f.) Meve & Liede
- Vincetoxicum elmeri (Schltr.) Meve & Liede
- Vincetoxicum emeiense Si Y.Zeng & Q.Y.Yang
- Vincetoxicum erectum (F.Muell. ex Benth.) Kuntze
- Vincetoxicum exile (Colebr.) Kuntze
- Vincetoxicum fasciculatum (Buch.-Ham. ex Wight) Kuntze
- Vincetoxicum flanaganii (Schltr.) Meve & Liede
- Vincetoxicum flavum Ostapko
- Vincetoxicum fleckii (Schltr.) Meve & Liede
- Vincetoxicum flexuosum (R.Br.) Kuntze
- Vincetoxicum floribundum (Miq.) Franch. & Sav.
- Vincetoxicum fordii (Hemsl.) Kuntze
- Vincetoxicum forrestii (Schltr.) C.Y.Wu & D.Z.Li
- Vincetoxicum forsteri Meve & Liede
- Vincetoxicum fruticulosum (Decne.) Decne.
- Vincetoxicum funebre Boiss. & Kotschy
- Vincetoxicum fuscatum (Hornem.) Endl.
- Vincetoxicum gilbertii Meve & Liede
- Vincetoxicum gilletii (De Wild.) Meve & Liede
- Vincetoxicum glabriflorum (Warb.) Meve & Liede
- Vincetoxicum glaucescens (Decne.) C.Y.Wu & D.Z.Li
- Vincetoxicum glaucirameum (Schltr.) Schneidt, Meve & Liede
- Vincetoxicum glaucum (Wall. ex Wight) Rech.f.
- Vincetoxicum globiferum (Hook.f.) Kuntze
- Vincetoxicum govanii (Wight & Arn.) Meve & Liede
- Vincetoxicum gracilentum (Tsiang & P.T.Li) Meve & Liede
- Vincetoxicum gracillimum (Markgr.) Meve & Liede
- Vincetoxicum grandiflorum (R.Br.) Kuntze
- Vincetoxicum hainanense (Chun & Tsiang) Meve, H.H.Kong & Liede
- Vincetoxicum harmandii (Costantin) Meve & Liede
- Vincetoxicum helferi (Hook.f.) Kuntze
- Vincetoxicum hellwigii (Warb.) Meve & Liede
- Vincetoxicum hemsleyanum (Warb.) Meve & Liede
- Vincetoxicum henryanum Meve & Liede
- Vincetoxicum henryi (Warb. ex Schltr. & Diels) Meve & Liede
- Vincetoxicum heterophyllum (A.Rich.) Vatke
- Vincetoxicum himalaicum (Hook.f.) Kuntze
- Vincetoxicum hirsutum (Wall.) Kuntze
- Vincetoxicum hirundinaria Medik.
- Vincetoxicum hookerianum Kuntze
- Vincetoxicum hoyoense T.Yamash.
- Vincetoxicum hui (Tsiang) Meve & Liede
- Vincetoxicum huteri Vis. & Asch.
- Vincetoxicum hybanthera Kuntze
- Vincetoxicum hydrophilum (Tsiang & H.D.Zhang) C.Y.Wu & D.Z.Li
- Vincetoxicum inamoenum Maxim.
- Vincetoxicum indicum (Burm.f.) Mabb.
- Vincetoxicum inhambanense (Schltr.) Meve & Liede
- Vincetoxicum insigne (Tsiang) Meve, H.H.Kong & Liede
- Vincetoxicum insulicola Meve & Liede
- Vincetoxicum iphisia Meve & Liede
- Vincetoxicum iringensis (Markgr.) Goyder
- Vincetoxicum irrawadense Kuntze
- Vincetoxicum izuense T.Yamash.
- Vincetoxicum jacquemontianum (Decne.) Kuntze
- Vincetoxicum japonicum C.Morren & Decne.
- Vincetoxicum josephrockii Meve & Liede
- Vincetoxicum juzepczukii (Pobed.) Privalova
- Vincetoxicum katoi (Ohwi) Kitag.
- Vincetoxicum kerrii (Craib) A.Kidyoo
- Vincetoxicum koi (Merr.) Meve & Liede
- Vincetoxicum krameri Franch. & Sav.
- Vincetoxicum lancilimbum (Merr.) Meve & Liede
- Vincetoxicum laxiforme Meve & Liede
- Vincetoxicum lenifolium S.A.Shah
- Vincetoxicum leptanthum (Tsiang) Meve & Liede
- Vincetoxicum leschenaultii Kuntze
- Vincetoxicum liebianum (F.Muell.) Liede
- Vincetoxicum lii Meve & Liede
- Vincetoxicum lineare (Decne.) Meve & Liede
- Vincetoxicum linearisepalum (P.T.Li) P.T.Li
- Vincetoxicum linifolium Balf.f.
- Vincetoxicum longifolium (Wight) Kuntze
- Vincetoxicum longipes (Turcz.) Meve & Liede
- Vincetoxicum lugardiae (Bullock) Meve & Liede
- Vincetoxicum lui (Y.H.Tseng & C.T.Chao) Meve & Liede
- Vincetoxicum luridum Stocks ex S.A.Shah
- Vincetoxicum lycioides (E.Mey.) Kuntze
- Vincetoxicum macrophyllum Siebold & Zucc.
- Vincetoxicum mairei (Hand.-Mazz.) Meve & Liede
- Vincetoxicum matsumurae (T.Yamaz.) H.Ohashi
- Vincetoxicum membranaceum (Tsiang & P.T.Li) Meve & Liede
- Vincetoxicum microcentrum (Tsiang) Meve & Liede
- Vincetoxicum microstachys (Hook.) Meve & Liede
- Vincetoxicum miquelianum Kuntze
- Vincetoxicum mongolicum Maxim.
- Vincetoxicum monticola Goyder
- Vincetoxicum mozaffarianii Zaeifi
- Vincetoxicum nakaianum K.Mochizuki & Ohi-Toma
- Vincetoxicum mukdenense Kitag.
- Vincetoxicum nanum (Buch.-Ham. ex Wight) Liede
- Vincetoxicum neglectum (J.Mathew) Kottaim.
- Vincetoxicum nicobaricum (Murugan & M.Y.Kamble) Meve & Liede
- Vincetoxicum nigrum (L.) Moench
- Vincetoxicum nipponicum (Matsum.) Kitag.
- Vincetoxicum oblongum (N.E.Br.) Meve & Liede
- Vincetoxicum oculatum (N.E.Br.) Meve & Liede
- Vincetoxicum oligophyllum (Tsiang) Meve & Liede
- Vincetoxicum oshimae (Hayata) Meve & Liede
- Vincetoxicum paniculatum (R.Br.) Kuntze
- Vincetoxicum pannonicum (Borhidi) Holub
- Vincetoxicum parviflorum Decne.
- Vincetoxicum parviurnulum (M.G.Gilbert & P.T.Li) Meve & Liede
- Vincetoxicum parvum Meve & Liede
- Vincetoxicum petrense (Hemsl. & Lace) Rech.f.
- Vincetoxicum philippicum Meve, Omlor & Liede
- Vincetoxicum pictum (Tsiang) Meve & Liede
- Vincetoxicum pierrei (Costantin) Meve & Liede
- Vincetoxicum pilosellum Meve & Liede
- Vincetoxicum pingshanicum (M.G.Gilbert & P.T.Li) Liede
- Vincetoxicum polyanthum Kuntze
- Vincetoxicum potamophilum A.Kidyoo
- Vincetoxicum pumilum Decne.
- Vincetoxicum × purpurascens C.Morren & Decne.
- Vincetoxicum raddeanum Albov
- Vincetoxicum rechingeri (Schltr.) Meve & Liede
- Vincetoxicum rehmannii Boiss.
- Vincetoxicum renchangii (Tsiang) Meve & Liede
- Vincetoxicum revolutum (M.G.Gilbert & P.T.Li) Meve & Liede
- Vincetoxicum riparium (Tsiang & H.D.Zhang) C.Y.Wu & D.Z.Li
- Vincetoxicum robinsonii (Costantin) Meve & Liede
- Vincetoxicum rockii (M.G.Gilbert & P.T.Li) Liede
- Vincetoxicum rossicum (Kleopow) Barbar.
- Vincetoxicum rotundifolium (Buch.-Ham. ex Wight) Kuntze
- Vincetoxicum roylei (Wight) Kuntze
- Vincetoxicum rupestre (Blume) Kuntze
- Vincetoxicum rupicola (P.I.Forst.) Meve & Liede
- Vincetoxicum × sakaianum (Honda) Kitag.
- Vincetoxicum sakesarense Ali & Khatoon
- Vincetoxicum sarasinorum (Warb.) Meve & Liede
- Vincetoxicum scandens Sommier & Levier
- Vincetoxicum schimperi (Vatke) Meve & Liede
- Vincetoxicum schmalhausenii (Kusn.) Litv.
- Vincetoxicum schneideri Meve & Liede
- Vincetoxicum secamonoides (Tsiang) Meve & Liede
- Vincetoxicum setosum (Schltr.) Meve & Liede
- Vincetoxicum shaanxiense Meve & Liede
- Vincetoxicum siamicum A.Kidyoo
- Vincetoxicum sibiricum (L.) Decne.
- Vincetoxicum sieboldii Franch. & Sav.
- Vincetoxicum silvestre (Tsiang) Meve & Liede
- Vincetoxicum silvestrii (Pamp.) Meve & Liede
- Vincetoxicum simianum (Schltr.) Meve & Liede
- Vincetoxicum sinaicum Meve & Liede
- Vincetoxicum somaliense (Liede) Meve & Liede
- Vincetoxicum sootepense (Craib) A.Kidyoo
- Vincetoxicum speciosum Boiss. & Spruner
- Vincetoxicum spirale (Forssk.) D.Z.Li
- Vincetoxicum splendidum (P.I.Forst.) Meve & Liede
- Vincetoxicum stauntonii (Decne.) C.Y.Wu & D.Z.Li
- Vincetoxicum stauropolitanum Pobed.
- Vincetoxicum stenophyllum (Hemsl.) Kuntze
- Vincetoxicum stewartianum S.A.Shah
- Vincetoxicum stocksii Ali & Khatoon
- Vincetoxicum strigosum A.Kidyoo
- Vincetoxicum stylesii Meve, Heiduk & Liede
- Vincetoxicum subcanescens S.A.Shah & A.Sultan
- Vincetoxicum sublanceolatum (Miq.) Maxim.
- Vincetoxicum subramanii (A.N.Henry) Meve & Liede
- Vincetoxicum sui (Y.H.Tseng & C.T.Chao) T.C.Hsu
- Vincetoxicum svetlanae Ostapko
- Vincetoxicum sylvaticum (Decne.) Kuntze
- Vincetoxicum taihangense (Tsiang & H.D.Zhang) C.Y.Wu & D.Z.Li
- Vincetoxicum taiwanense (Hatus.) T.C.Hsu
- Vincetoxicum tanakae (Maxim.) Franch. & Sav.
- Vincetoxicum tenerrimum (Wight) Kuntze
- Vincetoxicum tengii (Tsiang) Meve & Liede
- Vincetoxicum tenuipedunculatum (K.Schum.) Meve & Liede
- Vincetoxicum thailandense (P.T.Li) Liede
- Vincetoxicum thorelii Meve & Liede
- Vincetoxicum tmoleum Boiss.
- Vincetoxicum tridactylatum (Goyder) Meve & Liede
- Vincetoxicum tsaii Meve & Liede
- Vincetoxicum tsiangii (P.T.Li) P.T.Li
- Vincetoxicum tsiukowense (M.G.Gilbert & P.T.Li) Meve & Liede
- Vincetoxicum tylophoroides (Costantin) Meve & Liede
- Vincetoxicum ucrainicum Ostapko
- Vincetoxicum umbelliferum Meve & Liede
- Vincetoxicum uncinatum (M.G.Gilbert & P.T.Li) Meve & Liede
- Vincetoxicum utriculosum (Costantin) Liede
- Vincetoxicum versicolor (Bunge) Decne.
- Vincetoxicum verticillatum (Hemsl.) Kuntze
- Vincetoxicum villosum (Blume) Kuntze
- Vincetoxicum volubile Maxim.
- Vincetoxicum wangii (P.T.Li & W.Kittr.) Liede
- Vincetoxicum williamsii (P.I.Forst.) Meve & Liede
- Vincetoxicum woollsii (Benth.) Kuntze
- Vincetoxicum xinpingense H.Peng & Y.H.Wang
- Vincetoxicum yamanakae (Ohwi & H.Ohashi) H.Ohashi
- Vincetoxicum yingii Meve & Liede
- Vincetoxicum yonakuniense (Hatus.) T.Yamash. & Tateishi
- Vincetoxicum yunnanense (Schltr.) Meve & Liede
- Vincetoxicum zeylanicum (Decne.) Meve & Liede

formerly included

moved to other genera (Alexitoxicon, Antitoxicum, Asclepias, Blyttia, Cynanchum, Dictyanthus, Diplolepis, Gonolobus, Heterostemma, Macroscepis, Matelea, Orthosia, Pentatropis, Petalostelma, Polystemma)

1. V. abyssinicum - Cynanchum abyssinicum
2. V. acutissimum - Matelea acutissima
3. V. acutum - Cynanchum acutum
4. V. adalinae - Cynanchum adalinae
5. V. adenocardium - Matelea adenocardia
6. V. affine - Cynanchum mooreanum
7. V. africanum - Cynanchum africanum
8. V. alabamense - Matelea alabamensis
9. V. alatum - Cynanchum alatum
10. V. albidum - Alexitoxicon albidum
11. V. alpicolum - Alexitoxicon alpicola
12. V. ambiguum - Cynanchum ambiguum
13. V. amplexicaule - Cynanchum amplexicaule
14. V. angulatum - Orthosia scoparia
15. V. angustilobum - Matelea angustiloba
16. V. aphyllum - Orthosia scoparia
17. V. arenosum - Cynanchum arenosum
18. V. ascyrifolium - Cynanchum ascyrifolium
19. V. asperum - Gonolobus asper
20. V. astephanoides - Marsdenia astephanoides
21. V. atratum - Cynanchum atratum
22. V. atrocoronatum - Matelea atrocoronata
23. V. auriculatum - Cynanchum auriculatum
24. V. baldwinianum - Matelea baldwyniana
25. V. balfourianum - Cynanchum forrestii
26. V. barbatum - Gonolobus barbatus
27. V. belizense - Matelea belizensis
28. V. bifidum - Gonolobus bifidus
29. V. biondioides - Cynanchum biondioides
30. V. boerhaviaefolium - Diplolepis boerhaviifolia
31. V. bojerianum - Cynanchum bojerianum
32. V. brandtii - Cynanchum brandtii
33. V. brevicoronatum - Matelea brevicoronata
34. V. bulligerum - Cynanchum bulligerum
35. V. calcaratum - Heterostemma acuminatum
36. V. calcicola - Matelea calcicola
37. V. callialatum - Cynanchum callialatum
38. V. campechianum - Matelea campechiana
39. V. camporum - Matelea camporum
40. V. capense - Pentatropis capensis
41. V. carolinense - Matelea carolinensis
42. V. caudatum - Matelea caudata
43. V. cavanillesii - Gonolobus niger
44. V. chekiangense - Cynanchum chekiangense
45. V. chiapense - Gonolobus chiapensis
46. V. chihuahuense - Matelea chihuahuensis
47. V. chiloense - Cynanchum pachyphyllum
48. V. chinense - Cynanchum mooreanum
49. V. chiriquense - Gonolobus chiriquensis
50. V. chrysanthum - Matelea chrysantha
51. V. congestum - Orthosia urceolata
52. V. crenatum - Matelea crenata
53. V. cteniophorum - Gonolobus cteniophorus
54. V. cyclophyllum - Matelea cyclophylla
55. V. cynanchoides - Matelea cynanchoides
56. V. dalhousiae - Cynanchum dalhousiae
57. V. dasystephanum - Gonolobus dasystephanus
58. V. diadematum - Macroscepis diademata
59. V. dombeyanum - Cynanchum dombeyanum
60. V. dubium - Gonolobus albomarginatus
61. V. edule - Gonolobus edulis
62. V. eichleri - Orthosia eichleri
63. V. erianthum - Gonolobus erianthus
64. V. erubescens - Cynanchum pedunculatum
65. V. eurychitoides - Cynanchum eurychitoides
66. V. excelsum - Cynanchum acutum
67. V. fimbriatum - Matelea cumanensis
68. V. flavidulum - Matelea flavidula
69. V. floridanum - Matelea floridana
70. V. fordii - Cynanchum fordii
71. V. formosanum - Cynanchum ovalifolium
72. V. forrestii - Cynanchum forrestii
73. V. fraternum - Gonolobus fraternus
74. V. fruticulosum - Blyttia fruticulosa
75. V. fuscum - Gonolobus fuscus
76. V. gentlei - Matelea gentlei
77. V. glaucescens - Cynanchum glaucescens
78. V. gonocarpos - Gonolobus suberosus
79. V. gracilipes - Cynanchum taihangense
80. V. grandiflorum Standl. not (R. Br.) Kuntze - Matelea fulvida
81. V. greggii - Matelea greggii
82. V. guilleminianum - Orthosia guilleminiana
83. V. hancockianum - Cynanchum mongolicum
84. V. hastulatum - Matelea hastulata
85. V. hatchii - Matelea magnifolia
86. V. heydei - Cynanchum heydei
87. V. hirtellum - Metastelma hirtellum
88. V. holstii - Cynanchum abyssinicum
89. V. hydrophilum - Cynanchum hydrophilum
90. V. insulanum - Cynanchum insulanum
91. V. jacquemontianum - Cynanchum jacquemontianum
92. V. jaliscense - Gonolobus jaliscensis
93. V. japonicum var. grayanum - Cynanchum grayanum
94. V. kitagawae - Cynanchum inamoenum
95. V. krameri - Cynanchum krameri
96. V. kunthii - Cynanchum kunthii
97. V. lasiostomum - Gonolobus lasiostomus
98. V. lateriflorum - Cynanchum mongolicum
99. V. leptocladum - Cynanchum leptocladum
100. V. lesueurii - Matelea lesueurii
101. V. limprichtii - Cynanchum forrestii
102. V. linearifolium - Cynanchum stauntonii
103. V. linearisepalum - Cynanchum linearisepalum
104. V. linifolium - Cynanchum linifolium
105. V. littorale - Dictyanthus asper
106. V. lundellii - Gonolobus cteniophorus
107. V. luteum Sieber ex Boiss. not Hoffmanns. & Link - Asclepias lutea
108. V. macranthum - Gonolobus macranthus
109. V. macrophyllum var. nikoensis - Cynanchum inamoenum
110. V. magnifolium - Matelea magnifolia
111. V. mandschuricum - Cynanchum versicolor
112. V. mannii - Cynanchum adalinae subsp. mannii
113. V. medium - Antitoxicum medium
114. V. megacarphum - Dictyanthus asper
115. V. melanthum - Orthosia melantha
116. V. microphyllum - Cynanchum microphyllum
117. V. mongolicum - Cynanchum mongolicum
118. V. mucronatum - Cynanchum chilense
119. V. muliense - Cynanchum forrestii
120. V. multiflorum - Cynanchum multiflorum
121. V. multinerve - Cynanchum atratum
122. V. myrtifolium - Cynanchum myrtifolium
123. V. nemorosum - Cynanchum pachyphyllum
124. V. nigrescens - Matelea nigrescens
125. V. nummulariifolium - Diplolepis nummulariifolia
126. V. oaxacanum - Matelea oaxacana
127. V. obliquum - Matelea obliqua
128. V. oblongatum - Matelea oblongata
129. V. obtusifolium - Cynanchum obtusifolium
130. V. ochroleucum - Alexitoxicon ochroleucum
131. V. otophyllum - Cynanchum otophyllum
132. V. pachylepis - Marsdenia araujacea
133. V. pachyphyllum - Cynanchum pachyphyllum
134. V. parvifolium - Matelea parvifolia
135. V. patagonicum - Diplolepis nummulariifolia
136. V. pauciflorum - Cynanchum atratum
137. V. pectinatum - Gonolobus pectinatus
138. V. petiolare - Matelea petiolaris
139. V. petrense - Cynanchum petrense
140. V. petrophilum - Alexitoxicon petrophilum
141. V. pinguifolium - Matelea pinguifolia
142. V. pittieri - Matelea picturata
143. V. polyanthum - Cynanchum polyanthum
144. V. porphyranthum - Matelea porphyrantha
145. V. productum - Matelea producta
146. V. propinquum - Gonolobus macranthus
147. V. pseudobarbatum - Matelea pseudobarbata
148. V. puberulum - Alexitoxicon puberulum
149. V. pubescens - Cynanchum chinense
150. V. pubiflorum - Matelea pubiflora
151. V. pueblense - Matelea pueblensis
152. V. purpureum - Cynanchum purpureum
153. V. quercetorum - Matelea quercetorum
154. V. quirosii - Polystemma guatemalense
155. V. repandum - Cynanchum repandum
156. V. reticulatum - Matelea reticulata
157. V. riedelii - Orthosia guilleminiana
158. V. riparium - Cynanchum riparium
159. V. robertii - Petalostelma robertii
160. V. rothschuhii - Gonolobus heterophyllus
161. V. rutenbergianum - Cynanchum repandum
162. V. saepimentorum - Cynanchum racemosum var. unifarium
163. V. sagittifolium - Matelea sagittifolia
164. V. salvinii - Gonolobus salvinii
165. V. schippii - Gonolobus leianthus
166. V. schmalhausenii - Vincetoxicum schmalhausenii
167. V. scoparium - Orthosia scoparia
168. V. selloanum - Orthosia selloana
169. V. sepium - Metastelma sepium
170. V. shortii - Matelea obliqua
171. V. sibiricum var. australe - Cynanchum thesioides
172. V. sibiricum var. boreale - Cynanchum thesioides
173. V. sintenisii - Matelea sintenisii
174. V. stauntonii - Cynanchum stauntonii
175. V. stenanthum - Gonolobus stenanthus
176. V. stenophyllum - Cynanchum stenophyllum
177. V. stephanotrichum - Gonolobus stephanotrichus
178. V. steppicola - Cynanchum forrestii
179. V. striatum - Gonolobus striatus
180. V. suberiferum - Matelea suberifera
181. V. suberosum - Gonolobus suberosus
182. V. sublanceolatum - Cynanchum sublanceolatum
183. V. taihangense - Cynanchum taihangense
184. V. thesioides - Cynanchum thesioides
185. V. tingens - Gonolobus tingens
186. V. tmoleum - Antitoxicum tmoleum
187. V. tomentosum - Orthosia scoparia
188. V. tortum - Gonolobus cteniophorus
189. V. trichoneuron - Matelea tuerckheimii
190. V. triflorum - Gonolobus triflorus
191. V. tristiflorum - Matelea tristiflora
192. V. tunicatum - Cynanchum tunicatum
193. V. umbellatum - Cynanchum rusbyi
194. V. umbrosum - Cynanchum umbrosum
195. V. undulatum - Cynanchum andinum
196. V. uniflorum - Gonolobus uniflorus
197. V. urceolatum - Orthosia urceolata
198. V. variifolium - Matelea variifolia
199. V. velutinum - Matelea velutina
200. V. versicolor - Cynanchum versicolor
201. V. verticillatum - Cynanchum verticillatum
202. V. virescens - Cynanchum eurychiton
203. V. viride - Cynanchum atacamense
204. V. viridiflorum - Matelea denticulata
205. V. wallichii - Cynanchum wallichii
206. V. wilfordii - Cynanchum wilfordii
207. V. wootonii - Matelea wootonii
208. V. xanthotrichum - Gonolobus xanthotrichus
209. V. zollingeri - Cynanchum ovalifolium

== Gallery ==
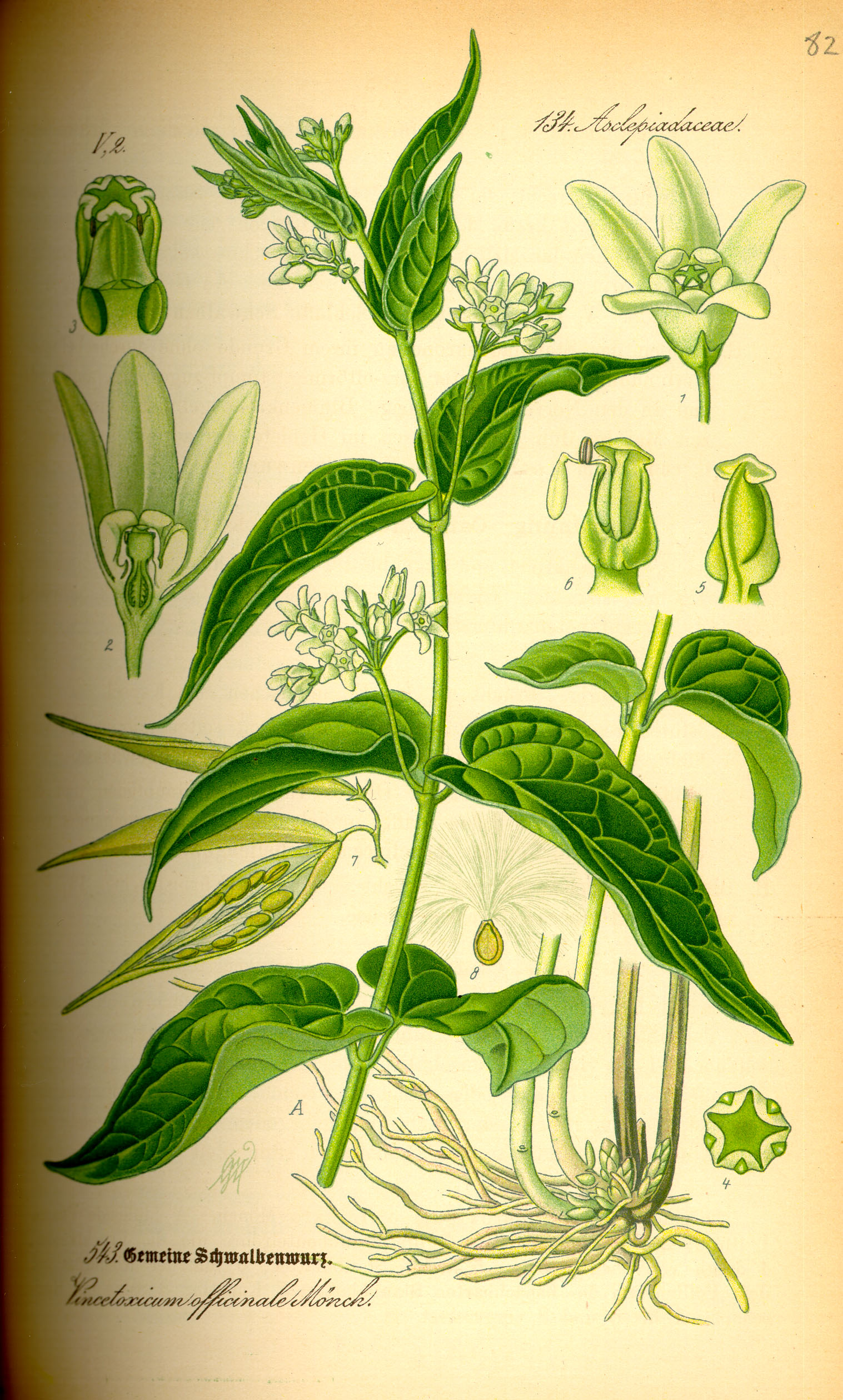

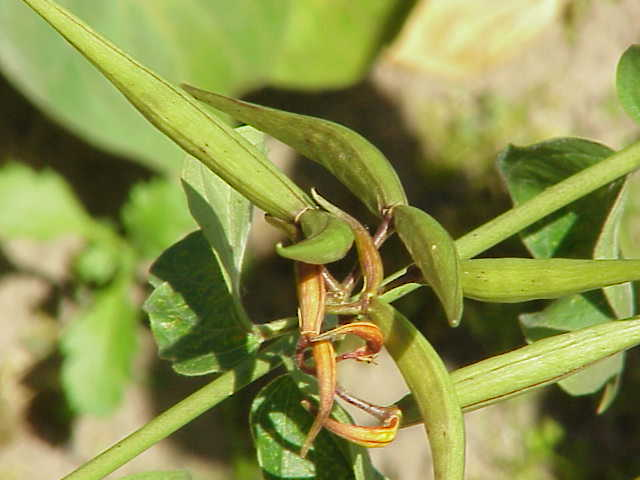

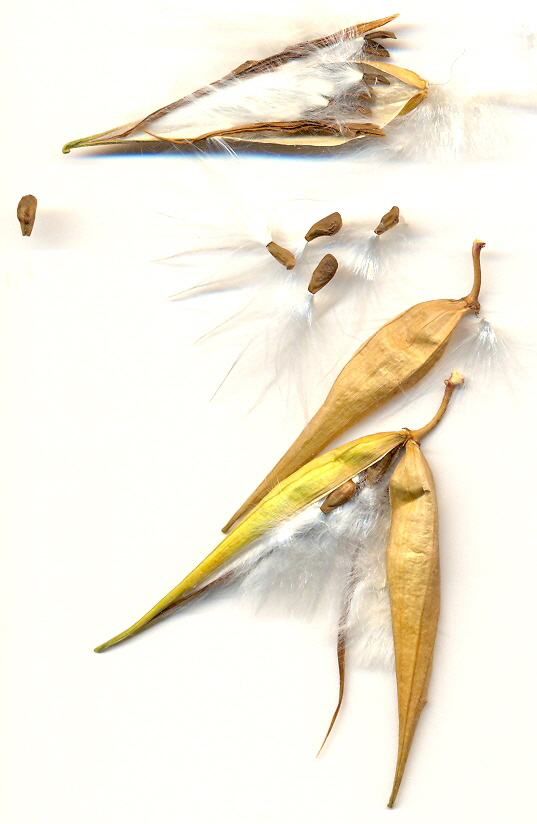

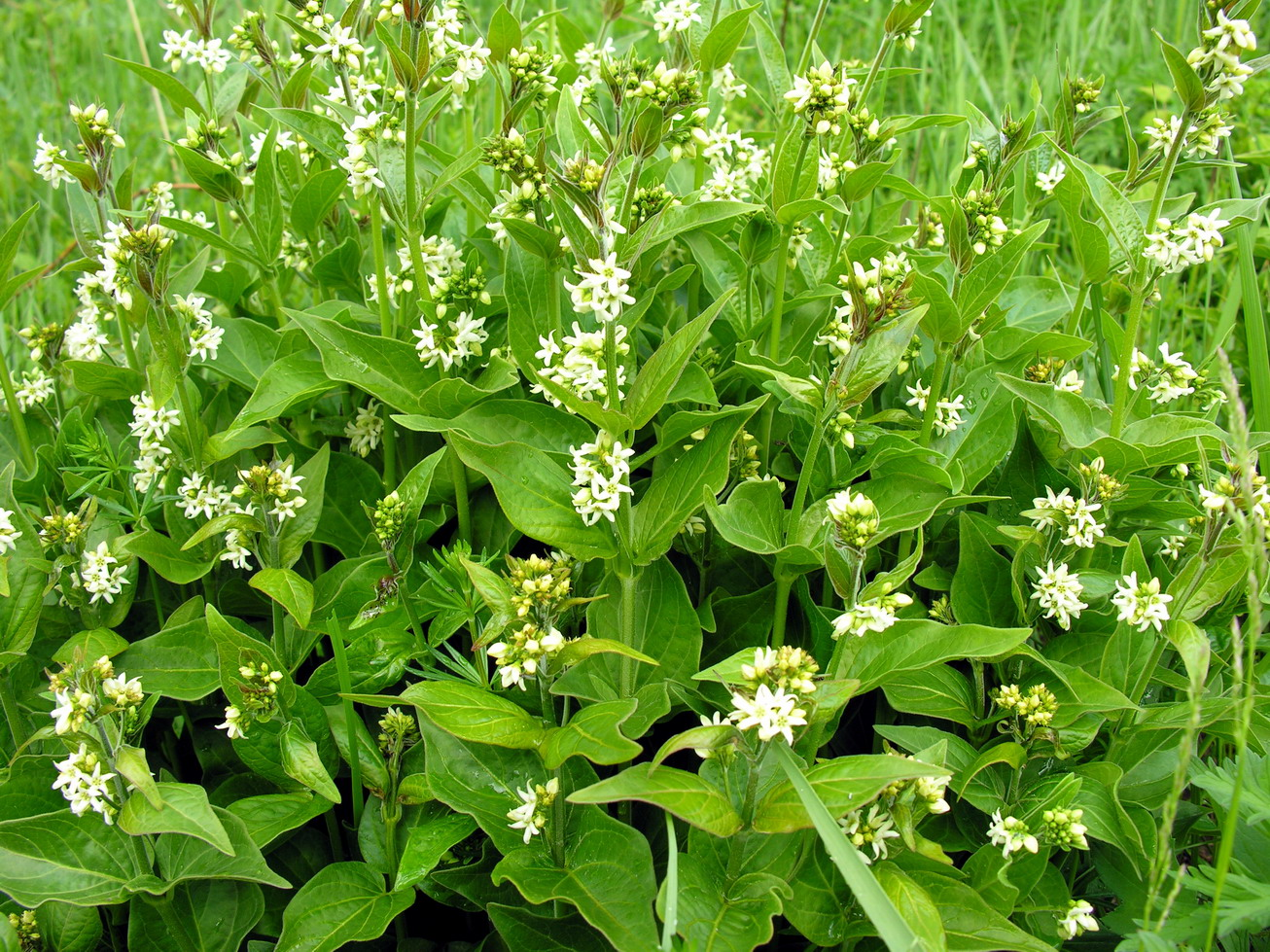
