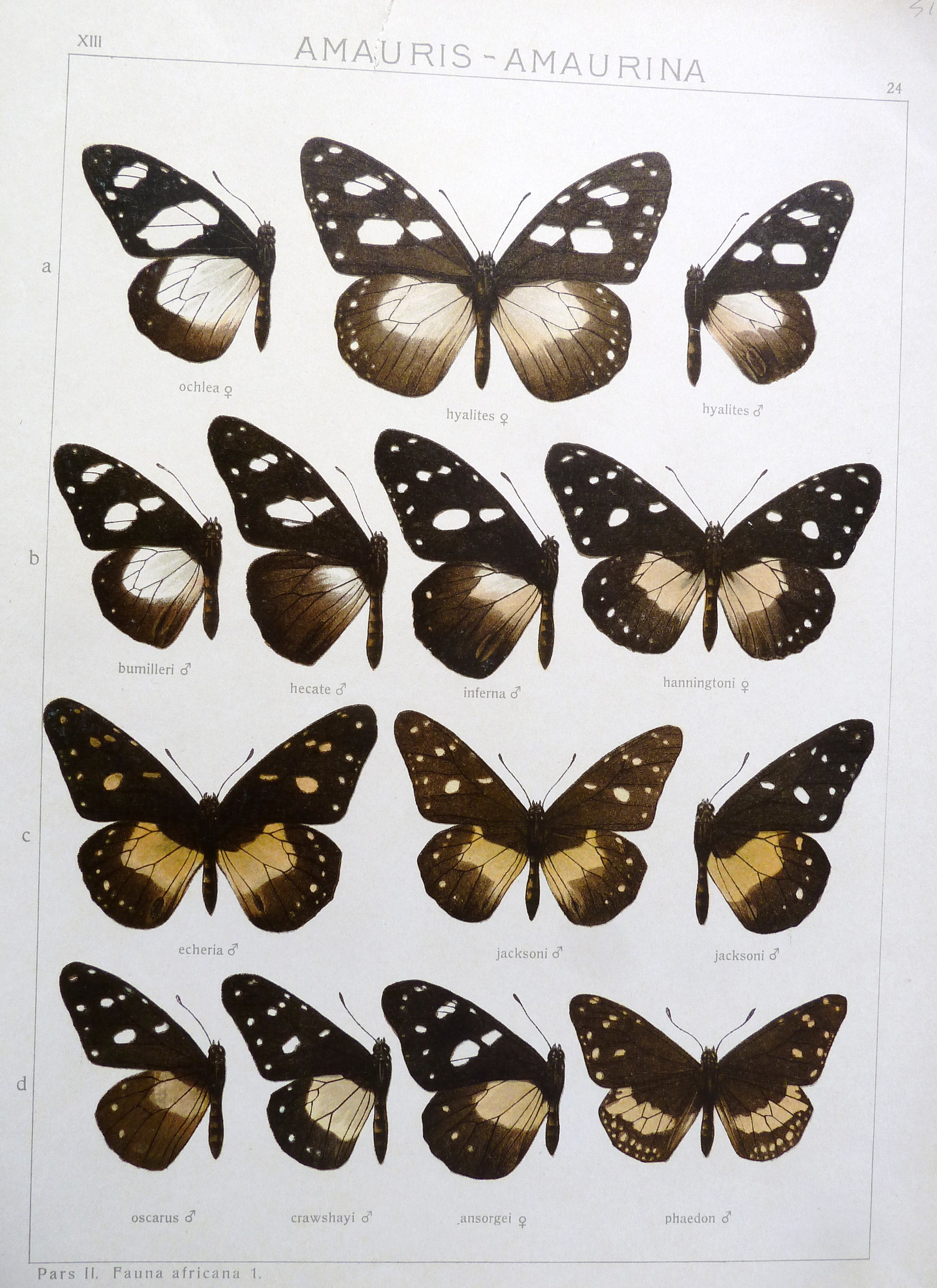
- From Adalbert Seitz's Fauna Africana

Scientific classification
- Kingdom: Animalia
- Phylum: Arthropoda
- Clade: Pancrustacea
- Class: Insecta
- Order: Lepidoptera
- Family: Nymphalidae
- Genus: Amauris
- Species: A. crawshayi

Binomial name
- Amauris crawshayi Butler, 1897

Synonyms
- Amauris echeria var. alba Neustetter, 1916; Amauris; (Amaura) crawshayi: Amauris angola Bethune-Baker, 1914; Amauris lobengula camerunica Joicey & Talbot, 1925; Amauris echeria var. oscarus Thurau, 1904; Amauris echeriax var. prominens Grünberg, 1908; Amauris crawshayi var. reducta Aurivillius, 1922; Amauris echeria simulator Talbot, 1926

= Amauris crawshayi =

Species of butterfly

Amauris crawshayi is a butterfly in the family Nymphalidae. It is found in Cameroon, Angola, the Democratic Republic of the Congo, Uganda, Rwanda, Burundi, Kenya, Tanzania, Malawi and Zambia. The habitat consists of forests.

The larvae feed on Vincetoxicum (syn. Tylophora) (including V. anomala), Marsdenia, Cynanchum, Gymnema and Secamone species.

== Subspecies ==
- A. c. crawshayi (northern Malawi, southern and south-eastern Tanzania)
- A. c. angola Bethune-Baker, 1914 (Angola)
- A. c. camerunica Joicey & Talbot, 1925 (Ghana to Cameroon)
- A. c. oscarus Thurau, 1904 (western Kenya, Uganda, Democratic Republic of the Congo, Rwanda, Burundi, north-western Tanzania)
- A. c. simulator Talbot, 1926 (Zambia, Democratic Republic of the Congo: south-east to Shaba, Lulua, Maniema)
