= Pentatropis =

Scientific classification
- Kingdom: Plantae
- Clade: Tracheophytes
- Clade: Angiosperms
- Clade: Eudicots
- Clade: Asterids
- Order: Gentianales
- Family: Apocynaceae
- Subfamily: Asclepiadoideae
- Tribe: Asclepiadeae
- Genus: Pentatropis; R.Br. ex Wight & Arn.

Type species
- Pentatropis microphylla (Roth ex Schult.) Wight & Arn. 1834 not Wall. 1847

Synonyms
- Eutropis Falc.

Genus of flowering plants

Pentatropis is a genus of plants in the family Apocynaceae, first described as a genus in 1834. It is native to Africa and southern Asia.

Species

1. Pentatropis bentii (N.E.Br.) Liede - from Arabia to Pakistan
2. Pentatropis capensis (L.f.) Bullock - India, Sri Lanka, Pakistan
3. Pentatropis fasciculatus (K. Schum.) N.E.Br. - tropical Africa
4. Pentatropis nivalis (J.F.Gmel.) D.V.Field & J.R.I.Wood - southern Africa, Madagascar
5. Pentatropis novo-guineensis Valeton - New Guinea
6. Pentatropis oblongifolia (Costantin) Liede - Thailand
7. Pentatropis pierrei Costantin - Vietnam
8. Pentatropis rigida Chiov. - Somalia
9. Pentatropis senegalensis Decne. - W Africa

formerly included

moved to other genera (Cynanchum, Daemia, Vincetoxicum)

1. P. atropurpurea now Daemia atropurpurea
2. P. kempeana now Daemia kempeana
3. P. linearis now Vincetoxicum lineare
4. P. officinalis now Cynanchum officinale
5. P. quinquepartita now Daemia quinquepartita
6. P. spiralis now Vincetoxicum spirale
