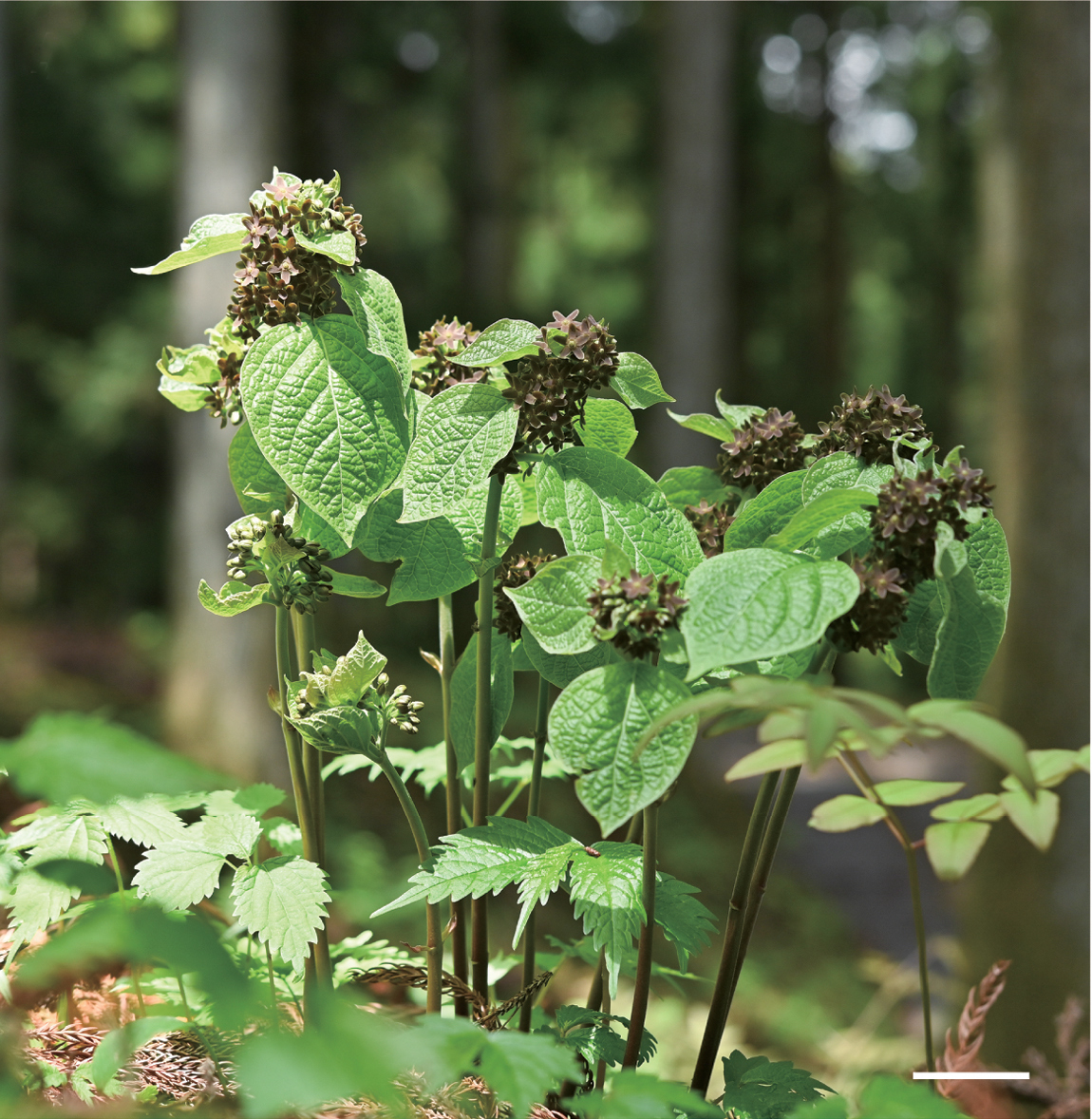
- V. nakaianum whole plant

Scientific classification
- Kingdom: Plantae
- Clade: Tracheophytes
- Clade: Angiosperms
- Clade: Eudicots
- Clade: Asterids
- Order: Gentianales
- Family: Apocynaceae
- Genus: Vincetoxicum
- Species: V. nakaianum

Binomial name
- Vincetoxicum nakaianum K.Mochizuki & Ohi-Toma

= Vincetoxicum nakaianum =

Species of plant

Vincetoxicum nakaianum (Japanese tachi-gashiwa) is a species of dogbane in the family Apocynaceae that is native to Japan. Originally discovered in 1937 by Takenoshin Nakai but incorrectly as Cynanchum magnificum, it was rediscovered and described in 2024 by Ko Mochizuki and Tetsuo Ohi-Toma. In 2025, it was discovered that the plant a scent that smells like dying ants – a strategy it uses for attracting flies for its pollination. It is the first plant known to specifically mimic ant odour for reproduction.

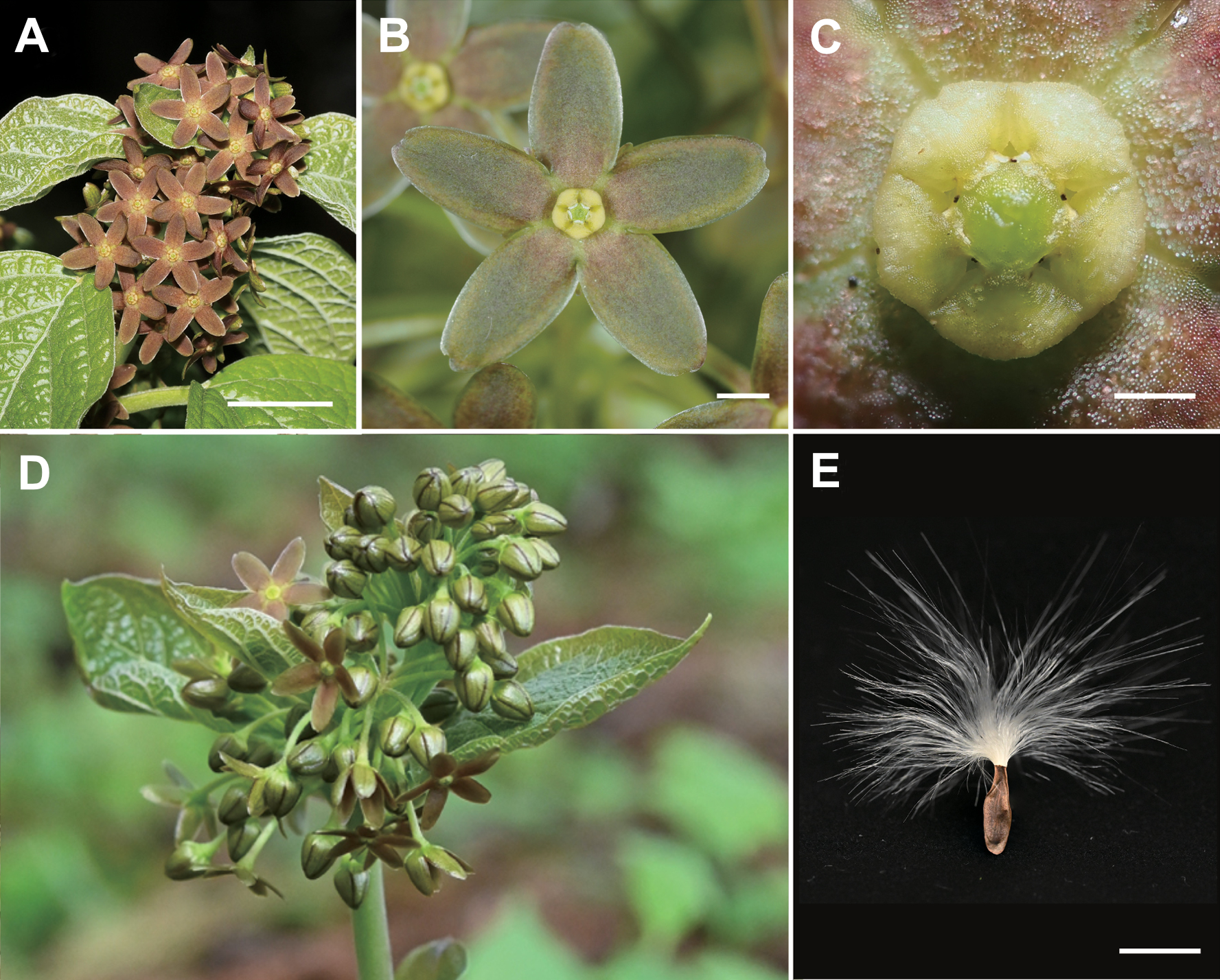
Flower (A-D) and seed (E) of V. nakaianum
