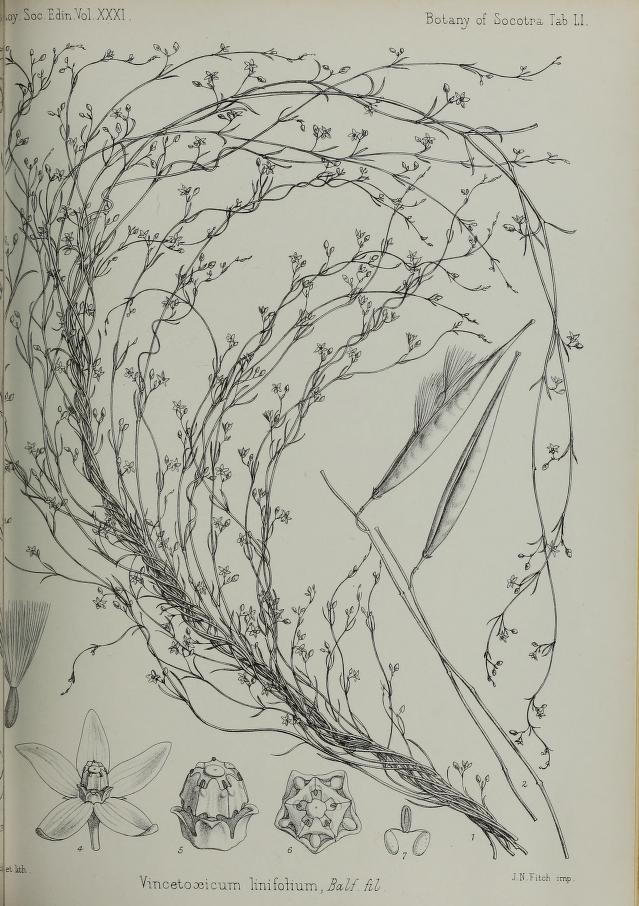

Conservation status
- Least Concern (IUCN 3.1)

Scientific classification
- Kingdom: Plantae
- Clade: Tracheophytes
- Clade: Angiosperms
- Clade: Eudicots
- Clade: Asterids
- Order: Gentianales
- Family: Apocynaceae
- Genus: Vincetoxicum
- Species: V. linifolium

Binomial name
- Vincetoxicum linifolium Balf.f.

= Vincetoxicum linifolium =

Species of plant

Vincetoxicum linifolium is a species of plant in the family Apocynaceae. It is endemic to Yemen. Its natural habitats are subtropical or tropical dry forests and subtropical or tropical dry shrubland.
