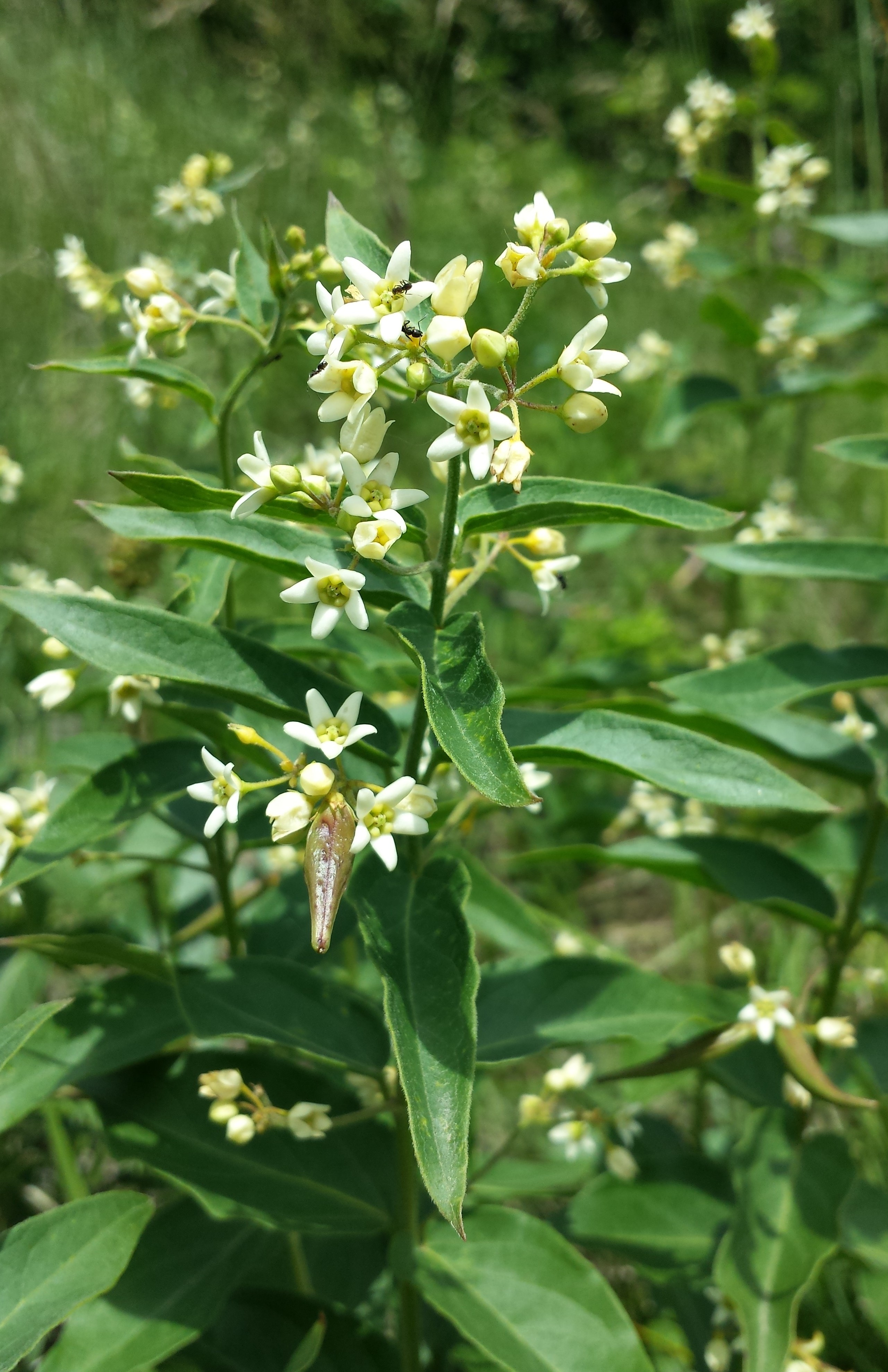

Scientific classification
- Kingdom: Plantae
- Clade: Tracheophytes
- Clade: Angiosperms
- Clade: Eudicots
- Clade: Asterids
- Order: Gentianales
- Family: Apocynaceae
- Genus: Vincetoxicum
- Species: V. hirundinaria

Binomial name
- Vincetoxicum hirundinaria Medik.

Synonyms
- Asclepias vincetoxicum L.; Cynanchum vincetoxicum (L.) Pers.

= Vincetoxicum hirundinaria =

Species of plant in the dogbane family

Vincetoxicum hirundinaria, commonly named white swallow-wort, is a long-lived herbaceous perennial of the genus Vincetoxicum in the family Apocynaceae.

== Etymology ==
The generic name Vincetoxicum, in Latin meaning ‘conqueror of poison’, derives from the traditional use of this plant as an antidote to poisons. The Latin species name hirundinaria (from hirundo, meaning swallow) and the common name white swallow-wort refer to its seedpods, that are reminiscent of a swallow's wing, or tail.

== Description ==
Vincetoxicum hirundinaria can reach a height of 30–70 centimetres (12–28 in). Stem is erect, stout and glabrous. Flowers in whorls form a raceme. They have a diamenter of about 1 centimetre (0.39 in). Corolla has five white petals. Calyx is composed by five fused, sharp-pointed sepals. Leaves are opposite, ovate to lanceolate and short-stalked. Fruits reach a length of about 5 cm and contain many seeds showing a tuft of white hairs. Flowering time lasts from June to the end of July.

== Distribution and habitat ==
This species is native to cliffs and slopes, especially in calcareous soils, of continental Eurasia (including some Baltic islands). There are introduced populations in North America (Ontario, Michigan, and New York). It is not present in Great Britain and Ireland.

== Human culture ==
Vincetoxicum hirundinaria is a poisonous plant traditionally used in treating diseases and in magic. The plant was mentioned by Pedanius Dioscorides as a traditional plant used by Dacians and known as the "herb of animals", believed to open any locked door.

== Gallery ==
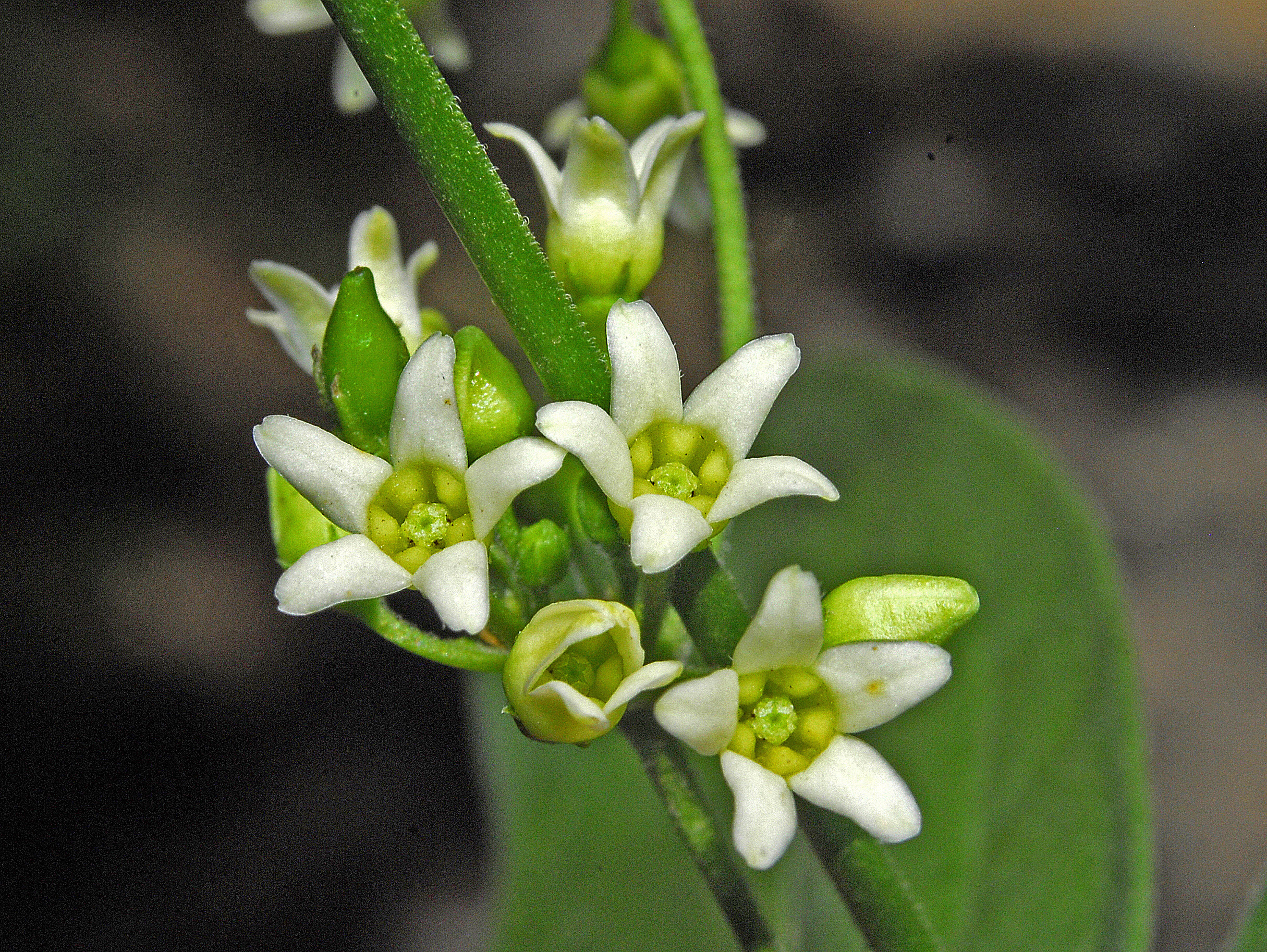
Close-up on flowers

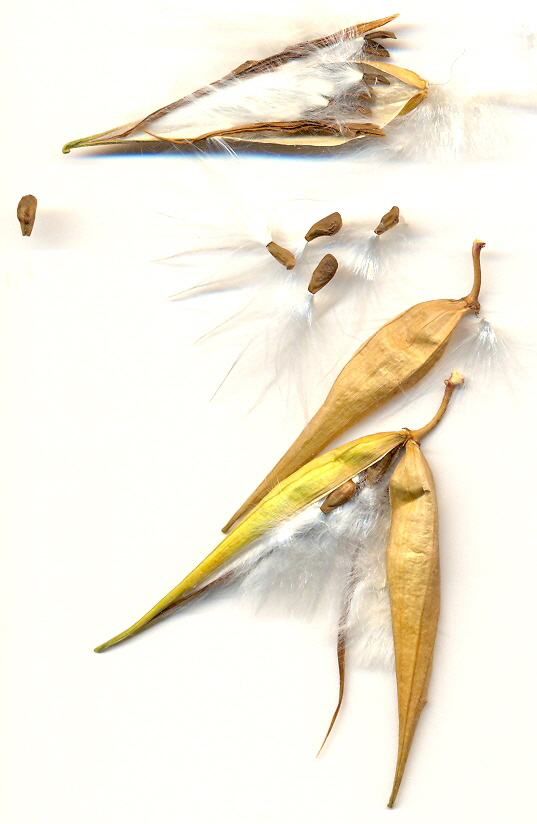
Seeds and hairy wool

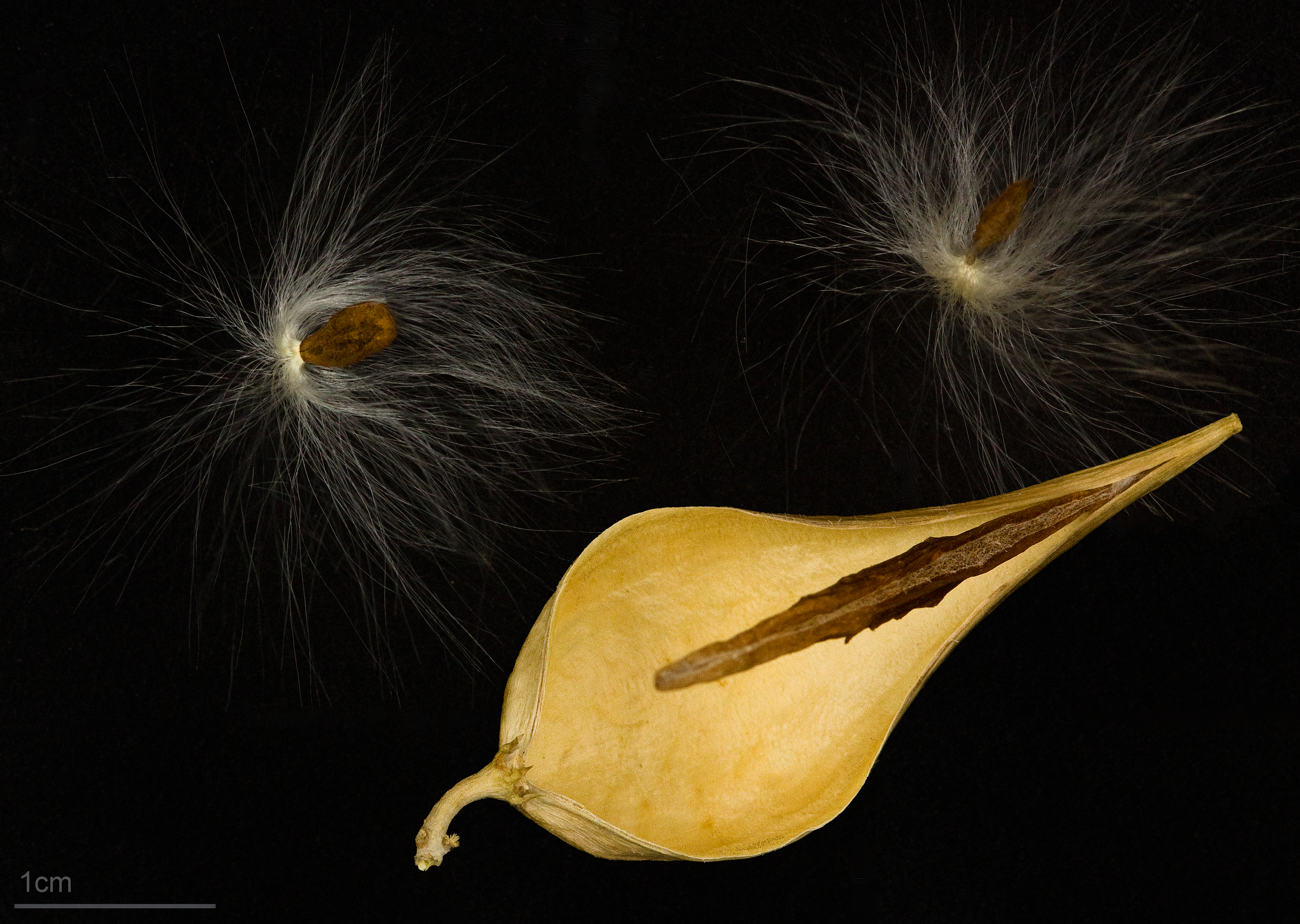
Fruit and seeds

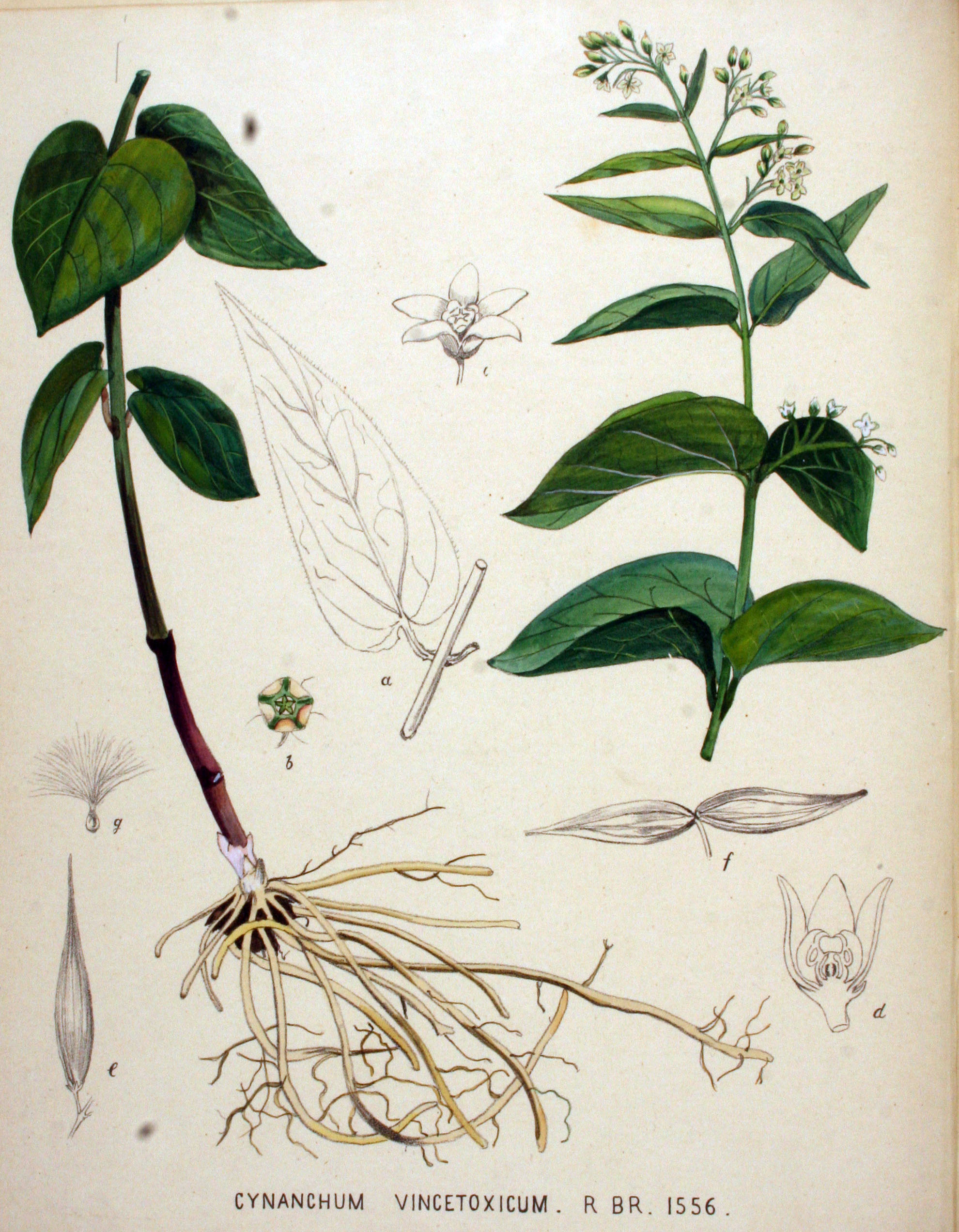
Illustration
