= Vincetoxicum hainanense =

Scientific classification
- Kingdom: Plantae
- Clade: Tracheophytes
- Clade: Angiosperms
- Clade: Eudicots
- Clade: Asterids
- Order: Gentianales
- Family: Apocynaceae
- Genus: Vincetoxicum
- Species: V. hainanense

Binomial name
- Vincetoxicum hainanense (Chun & Tsiang) Meve, H.H.Kong & Liede

Synonyms
- Merrillanthus hainanensis Chun & Tsiang

Species of plant

Vincetoxicum hainanense is a species of plants in the Apocynaceae. It was first described in 1941 as Merrillanthus hainanensis, which was the only species in the genus Merrillanthus.

It is native to Guangdong, Hainan, and Cambodia
