= Vincetoxicum diplostigma =

Scientific classification
- Kingdom: Plantae
- Clade: Tracheophytes
- Clade: Angiosperms
- Clade: Eudicots
- Clade: Asterids
- Order: Gentianales
- Family: Apocynaceae
- Genus: Vincetoxicum
- Species: V. diplostigma

Binomial name
- Vincetoxicum diplostigma Meve & Liede

Synonyms
- Diplostigma canescens K.Schum.

Species of plant

Vincetoxicum diplostigma is a species of plants in the family Apocynaceae. It was originally described in 1895 as Diplostigma canescens, the only species in the genus Diplostigma. It is native to parts of eastern Africa (Djibouti, Ethiopia, Kenya, Tanzania and Uganda) and to Saudi Arabia.
