= Vincetoxicum shaanxiense =

Conservation status
- Vulnerable (IUCN 3.1)

Scientific classification
- Kingdom: Plantae
- Clade: Tracheophytes
- Clade: Angiosperms
- Clade: Eudicots
- Clade: Asterids
- Order: Gentianales
- Family: Apocynaceae
- Genus: Vincetoxicum
- Species: V. shaanxiense

Binomial name
- Vincetoxicum shaanxiense Meve & Liede

Synonyms
- Biondia chinensis Schltr.

Species of plant

Vincetoxicum shaanxiense is a species of plant in the family Apocynaceae, first described in 1905. It is endemic to China, known from Gansu and Shaanxi Provinces.

The species is listed as vulnerable.
