= Vincetoxicum tsaii =

Conservation status
- Vulnerable (IUCN 3.1)

Scientific classification
- Kingdom: Plantae
- Clade: Tracheophytes
- Clade: Angiosperms
- Clade: Eudicots
- Clade: Asterids
- Order: Gentianales
- Family: Apocynaceae
- Genus: Vincetoxicum
- Species: V. tsaii

Binomial name
- Vincetoxicum tsaii Meve & Liede

Synonyms
- Belostemma yunnanense Tsiang

Species of plant

Vincetoxicum tsaii is a species of plant in the family Apocynaceae first described in 1941. It is endemic to Yunnan Province in China.

The species is listed as vulnerable.
