= Vincetoxicum auritum =

Conservation status
- Critically Endangered (IUCN 3.1)

Scientific classification
- Kingdom: Plantae
- Clade: Tracheophytes
- Clade: Angiosperms
- Clade: Eudicots
- Clade: Asterids
- Order: Gentianales
- Family: Apocynaceae
- Subfamily: Asclepiadoideae
- Tribe: Asclepiadeae
- Genus: Vincetoxicum
- Species: V. auritum

Binomial name
- Vincetoxicum auritum (Tsiang & P.T.Li) Meve, H.H.Kong & Liede (2018)

Synonyms
- Pentastelma auritum Y.Tsiang & P.T.Li (1974)

Species of flowering plant

Vincetoxicum auritum is a species of liana in the family Apocynaceae. It is endemic to the island of Hainan in southern China.

It was first described Pentastelma auritum in 1974, and placed in the monotypic genus Pentaselma. In 2018 it was reclassified into genus Vincetoxicum as V. auritum.

The species is listed as Critically Endangered.
