= Vincetoxicum forsteri =

Conservation status
- Endangered (EPBC Act)

Scientific classification
- Kingdom: Plantae
- Clade: Tracheophytes
- Clade: Angiosperms
- Clade: Eudicots
- Clade: Asterids
- Order: Gentianales
- Family: Apocynaceae
- Genus: Vincetoxicum
- Species: V. forsteri

Binomial name
- Vincetoxicum forsteri Meve & Liede

Synonyms
- Tylophora linearis P.I.Forst.

Species of flowering plant

Vincetoxicum forsteri is a species of plant in the dogbane family Apocynaceaethat is endemic to Australia (New South Wales and Queensland). It was first described by Paul Irwin Forster in 1992 as Tylophora linearis.

== Description ==
The species is a herbaceous vine with clear sap and stems up to 2 m long. The dark green, linear leaves grow to 100 mm in length and 4 mm in width. The olive-green and dark purple flowers are 6–22 mm in diameter. The fruits are 95–100 mm long and 5 mm wide.

== Taxonomy ==
Vincetoxicum forsteri was first described by Paul Irwin Forster in 1992 as Tylophora linearis. In 2018, Tylophora was synonymized with Vincetoxicum. As the combination Vincetoxicum lineare had priority, being based on Pentatropis linearis first published in 1844, a replacement name was needed, and Leide-Schumann and Meve published Vincetoxicum forsteri.

== Distribution and habitat ==
The species is known from the Dubbo and Barraba areas of New South Wales and Glenmorgan in Queensland, where it grows in open forest, woodlands and dry scrub, in association with Melaleuca uncinata, Eucalyptus fibrosa, E. sideroxylon, E. albens, Callitris endlicheri, C. glaucophylla, Allocasuarina luehmannii, Acacia hakeoides, A. lineata, Myoporum spp., and Casuarina spp.

== Conservation ==
The species has been listed as Endangered under Australia's EPBC Act. The main potential threats include competition from invasive weeds, grazing, wildfire and timber harvesting.
