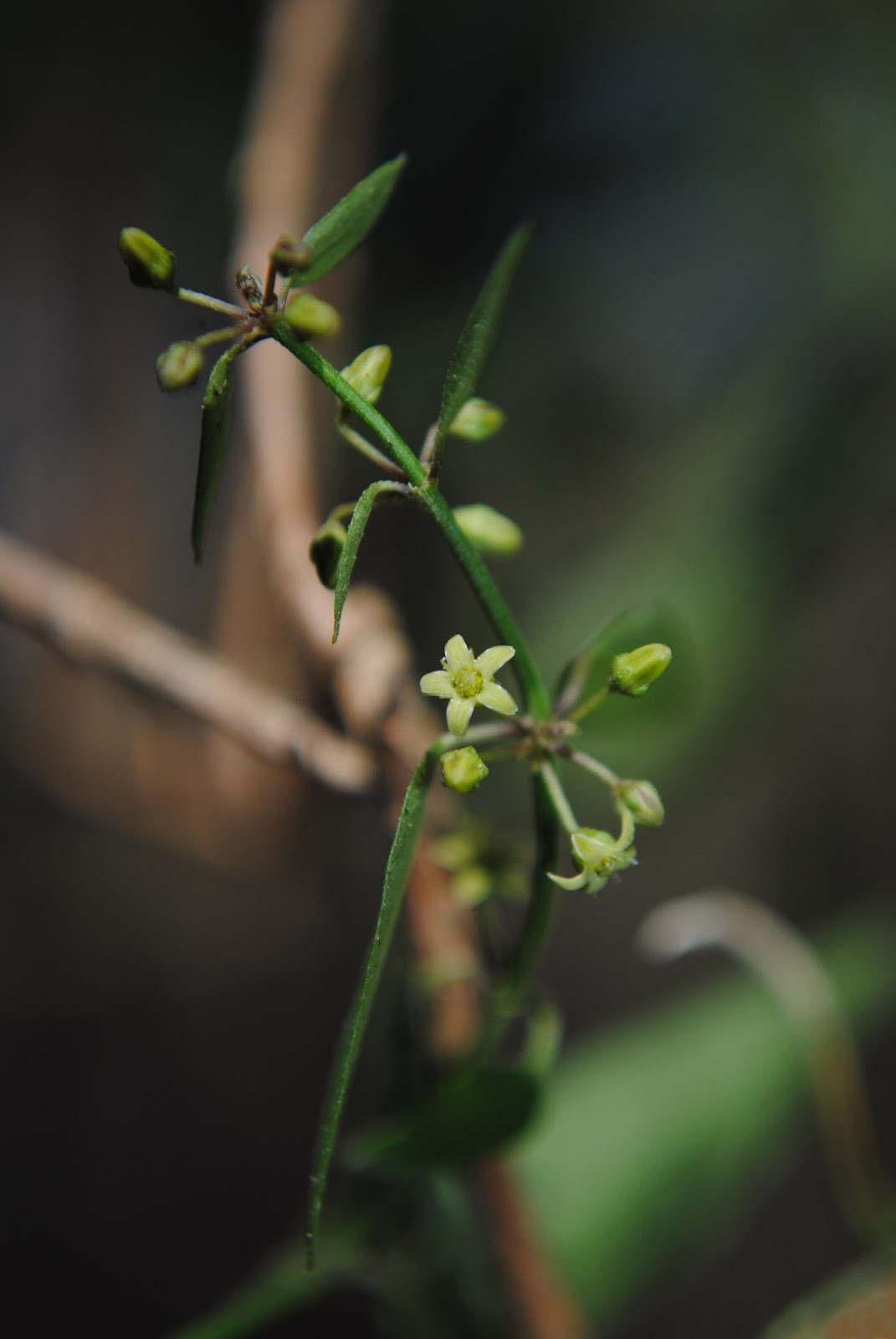
- Orthosia virgata

Scientific classification
- Kingdom: Plantae
- Clade: Tracheophytes
- Clade: Angiosperms
- Clade: Eudicots
- Clade: Asterids
- Order: Gentianales
- Family: Apocynaceae
- Subfamily: Asclepiadoideae
- Tribe: Asclepiadeae
- Genus: Orthosia; Decne.

= Orthosia (plant) =

Genus of neotropical flowering plants

Orthosia is a genus of plants in the family Apocynaceae, first described as a genus in 1844.

== Species ==
55 species as of May, 2025 accepted at Kew's Plants of the World:

1. Orthosia angustifolia (Schult.) Liede & Meve - Mexico (Veracruz, Puebla, Chiapas)
2. Orthosia boliviana Liede & Meve - Bolivia
3. Orthosia bonplandiana (Schult.) Liede & Meve - Colombia
4. Orthosia calycina (Schltr.) Liede & Meve - Peru
5. Orthosia cardozoi (Schult.) Liede & Meve - Venezuela
6. Orthosia cassythoides (Suess.) Morillo - Venezuela
7. Orthosia congesta (Vell.) Decne. - Brazil
8. Orthosia conradii (Schult.) Liede & Meve - Mexico (Michoacán)
9. Orthosia cynanchoides W.D. Stevens - Mexico (Chiapas)
10. Orthosia dusenii (Malme) Fontella - Brazil
11. Orthosia eichleri E.Fourn. - Brazil
12. Orthosia ellemanniae (Morillo) Liede & Meve - S. Ecuador to Peru
13. Orthosia extra-axillaris W.D. Stevens - Costa Rica
14. Orthosia florida (Vell.) Liede & Meve - N. Venezuela, E. & S. Brazil and NE. Argentina
15. Orthosia glaberrima (Woodson) W.D. Stevens - Panama, Costa Rica
16. Orthosia goyderiana Liede & Meve - Bolivia
17. Orthosia guilleminiana (Decne.) Liede & Meve - Brazil
18. Orthosia henriqueana (Silveira) Liede & Meve - Brazil (Minas Gerais)
19. Orthosia itatiaiensis Malme - Brail (Rio de Janeiro)
20. Orthosia jaliscoensis Liede & Meve - Mexico (Colima, Jalisco)
21. Orthosia leivae Liede & Meve - Ecuador to Peru
22. Orthosia leptocarpa (Rusby) Liede & Meve - NE. Colombia to Venezuela
23. Orthosia loandensis Fontella & Valente - Paraná
24. Orthosia meridensis (Morillo) Liede & Meve - NW. Venezuela
25. Orthosia mexicana (S.Watson) Liede & Meve - Mexico
26. Orthosia micrantha Liede & Meve - Venezuela
27. Orthosia misera (L.O.Williams) W.D.Stevens -- Mexico (Chiapas) to Honduras
28. Orthosia myriantha (Schltr.) Liede & Meve - Peru (Huanuco) to Bolivia
29. Orthosia nicaraguensis Liede & Meve - Nicaragua
30. Orthosia nubicola (Morillo) Liede & Meve - Venezuela
31. Orthosia pallida (Rusby) Liede & Meve - NE. Colombia to NW. Venezuela
32. Orthosia paranaensis Liede & Meve - Brazil (Paraná)
33. Orthosia parviflora (E. Fourn.) Liede & Meve - Rio de Janeiro
34. Orthosia pearcei (Rusby) Liede & Meve - Bolivia
35. Orthosia peruviana (Schltr.) Liede & Meve - Peru (Junín, Pasco)
36. Orthosia pietrangelii (Schltr.) Liede & Meve - Venezuela (Téchira)
37. Orthosia pubescens (Greenm.) Liede & Meve - Central Mexico
38. Orthosia ramosa W.D. Stevens - Honduras
39. Orthosia rariflora (Schltr.) Liede & Meve - Peru (Puno) to W. Bolivia
40. Orthosia retinaculata (Schltr.) Liede & Meve - Bolivia to NW. Argentina
41. Orthosia rubens (L.O. Williams) W.D. Stevens - Guatemala
42. Orthosia scoparia (Nutt.) Liede & Meve - Florida, Georgia, South Carolina
43. Orthosia selloana (E. Fourn.) Liede & Meve - Brazil
44. Orthosia sepium (Decne.) Liede & Meve - Mexico (E. Oaxaca)
45. Orthosia smaragdina W.D. Stevens - Guatemala
46. Orthosia stannardii (Morillo) Liede & Meve - Venezuela (Amazonas)
47. Orthosia stenophylla Schltr - Central & S. Colombia
48. Orthosia stipitata W.D. Stevens - Mexico (Chiapas)
49. Orthosia subulata (Vell.) Liede & Meve -SE. & S. Brazil to Argentina (Misiones)
50. Orthosia teodormeyeri Liede & Meve - NW Argentina
51. Orthosia tomentosa (E.Fourn.) Malme - SE. & S. Brazil to Argentina (Misiones)
52. Orthosia umbrosa Decne. - Rio de Janeiro
53. Orthosia urceolata E.Fourn. - Brazil
54. Orthosia virgata (Poir.) E. Fourn. - Argentina
55. Orthosia woodii Meve & Liede - Bolivia

Partial list of formerly included taxa:

1. O. acuminata, syn of Matelea acuminata
2. O. bahiensis, syn of Ditassa capillaris
3. O. cardozoi, syn of Cynanchum cardozoi
4. O. ecuadorensis, syn of Cynanchum densiflorum
5. O. ellemannii, syn of Cynanchum ellemannii
6. O. grandis, syn of Jobinia grandis
7. O. kunthii, syn of Cynanchum kunthii
8. O. meridensis, syn of Cynanchum meridense
9. O. misera, syn of Metastelma miserum
10. O. oblongata, syn of Matelea oblongata
11. O. serpyllifolia, syn of Vincetoxicum serpyllifolium
12. O. stannardii, syn of Cynanchum stannardii
13. O. stenophylla, syn of Cynanchum trianae
14. O. suberosa, syn of Metastelma parviflorum
15. O. ventensis, syn of Cynanchum ventensis
