= Vincetoxicum rupicola =

Scientific classification
- Kingdom: Plantae
- Clade: Tracheophytes
- Clade: Angiosperms
- Clade: Eudicots
- Clade: Asterids
- Order: Gentianales
- Family: Apocynaceae
- Genus: Vincetoxicum
- Species: V. rupicola

Binomial name
- Vincetoxicum rupicola (P.I.Forst.) Meve & Liede

Synonyms
- Tylophora rupicola P.I.Forst.

Species of flowering plant

Vincetoxicum rupicola is a species of plant in the dogbane family Apocynaceae that is endemic to Queensland, Australia. It was first described by Paul Irwin Forster in 1992 as Tylophora rupicola.

== Description ==
The species is a slender vine with clear sap and stems up to 1 m long. The dull green, dagger-shaped leaves grow to 55 mm in length. The pink, five-petalled flowers are about 10 mm in diameter. The spindle-shaped fruits are 40 mm long.

== Distribution and habitat ==
The species is known from the Wet Tropics of north-eastern Queensland, where it grows among grass and rocks above permanent water in grassy open forests of Allocasuarina torulosa, Eucalyptus granitica and Corymbia rhodops on granitic soils.

== Conservation ==
The species has been listed as Endangered under Australia's EPBC Act. The main potential threats include competition from invasive weeds, consequent increases in wildfire intensity, and timber harvesting.
