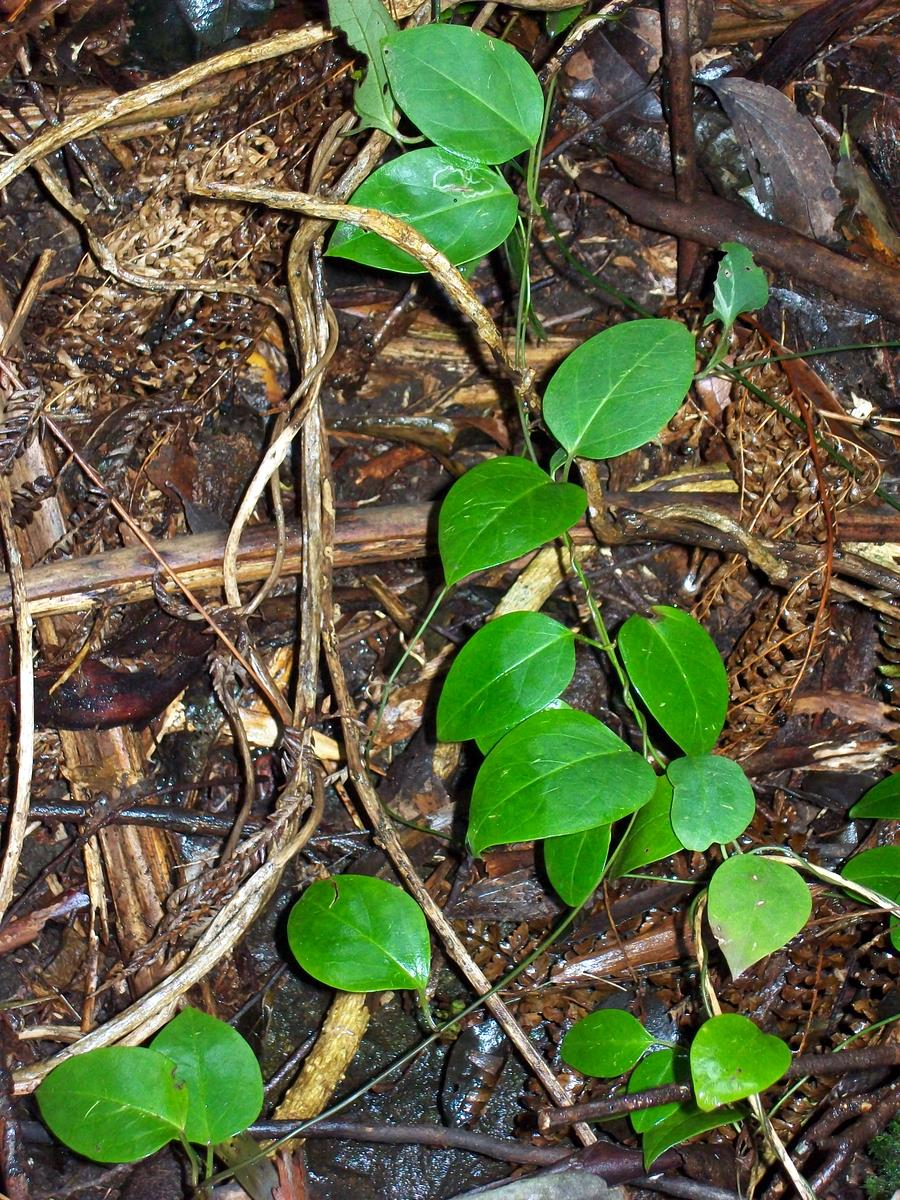

Scientific classification
- Kingdom: Plantae
- Clade: Tracheophytes
- Clade: Angiosperms
- Clade: Eudicots
- Clade: Asterids
- Order: Gentianales
- Family: Apocynaceae
- Genus: Vincetoxicum
- Species: V. barbatum

Binomial name
- Vincetoxicum barbatum (R.Br.) Kuntze

Synonyms
- Hoya barbata (R.Br.) Spreng.; Tylophora barbata R.Br.

= Vincetoxicum barbatum =

Species of vine

Vincetoxicum barbatum, synonym Tylophora barbata, the bearded tylophora, is a small vine in the dogbane family. A common plant found south of Bulahdelah, New South Wales. The habitat is rainforest and moist eucalyptus forests in south eastern Australia. Not often seen in flower, but flowers are dark red, around 7 mm long on thin stalks. Broken branches produce watery or milky sap.

== Description ==
A twining or climbing vine, Vincetoxicum barbatum can reach 2–3 m in length, often climbing trees or twining around its own branches. The stems and leaves are smooth and exude a clear sap when broken. The light green oval to spear-shaped leaves sit on 1–2 cm long petioles and measure 2.5–6 cm long by 2–4 cm wide. Flowering occurs from November to May, the small flowers are shades of maroon, purple or brown and measure 0.5–0.8 cm in diameter. It fruits two to three months after flowering.

== Taxonomy ==
In 1810, this species first appeared in scientific literature, in the Prodromus Florae Novae Hollandiae, authored by the prolific Scottish botanist, Robert Brown, who gave it the binomial name Tylophora barbata. The generic name was derived from the Ancient Greek tylos/τυλος "knot", and phoros/φορος "bearing", from the swollen staminal coronal lobes. Barbata means "bearded" from Latin, presumably referring to the bearded seeds. It has since been transferred to the genus Vincetoxicum.

== Distribution and habitat ==
Vincetoxicum barbatum is found from Bulahdelah, New South Wales southwards into northeastern Victoria. The only member of the genus in the Sydney basin, it is found in the Royal National Park and around Mount Tomah in the Blue Mountains. Its habitat is rainforest and wet sclerophyll forest, where it prefers wet areas such as gullies.

== Cultivation ==
Readily adapting to cultivation, Vincetoxicum barbatum prefers a well-drained soil and is propagated from seed or cutting. It is useful as a groundcover.
