= Vincetoxicum cameroonicum =

Scientific classification
- Kingdom: Plantae
- Clade: Tracheophytes
- Clade: Angiosperms
- Clade: Eudicots
- Clade: Asterids
- Order: Gentianales
- Family: Apocynaceae
- Genus: Vincetoxicum
- Species: V. cameroonicum

Binomial name
- Vincetoxicum cameroonicum (N.E.Br.) Meve & Liede

Synonyms
- Tylophora cameroonica N.E.Br.; Tylophora glauca Bullock

Species of plant

Vincetoxicum cameroonicum is a species of flowering plant in the family Apocynaceae, native from Benin to Uganda in tropical Africa. It was first described by N. E. Brown in 1895 as Tylophora cameroonica.

== Distribution ==
Vincetoxicum cameroonicum is native to mainly western tropical Africa: Benin, Cameroon, the Democratic Republic of the Congo, the Republic of the Congo, Ivory Coast, Nigeria and Uganda.

== Conservation ==
Tylophora cameroonica was assessed as "near threatened" in the 2000 IUCN Red List, where it is said to be native only to Cameroon, the Democratic Republic of the Congo, and Uganda. As of February 2023, T. cameroonica was regarded as a synonym of Vincetoxicum cameroonicum, which has a wider distribution.
