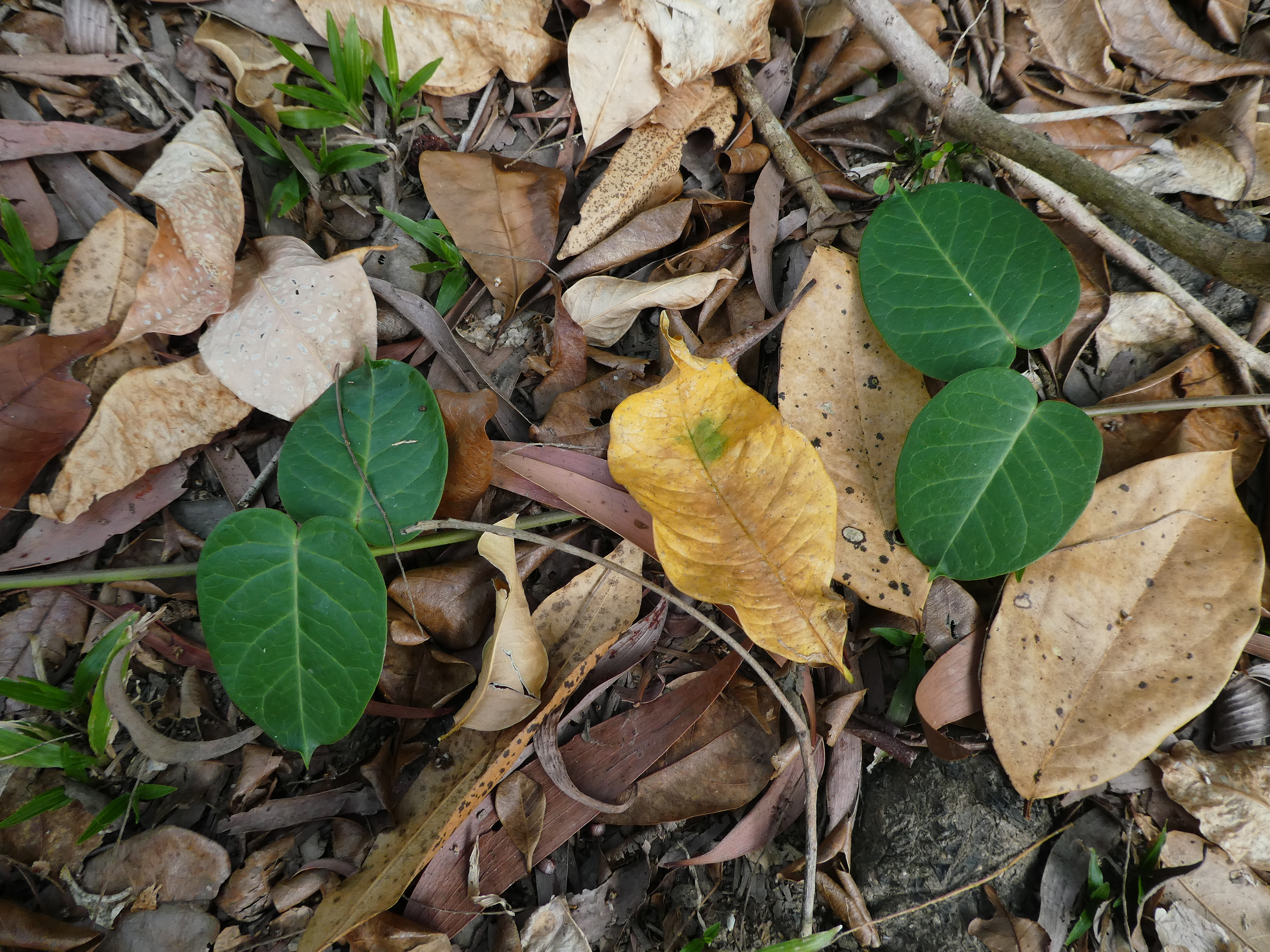

Conservation status
- Least Concern (NCA)

Scientific classification
- Kingdom: Plantae
- Clade: Tracheophytes
- Clade: Angiosperms
- Clade: Eudicots
- Clade: Asterids
- Order: Gentianales
- Family: Apocynaceae
- Genus: Vincetoxicum
- Species: V. polyanthum

Binomial name
- Vincetoxicum polyanthum Kuntze

Synonyms
- Tylophora benthamii Tsiang; Tylophora crebriflora S.T.Blake (nom. superfl.); Tylophora floribunda Benth. (nom. illeg.)

= Vincetoxicum polyanthum =

Species of flowering plant

Vincetoxicum polyanthum, commonly known as coast tylophora, is a vine in the dogbane family Apocynaceae first described in 1891 by the German botanist Otto Kuntze. It is native to the Australian states of New South Wales, the Northern Territory, and Queensland. In the most recent edition of the Australian Tropical Rainforest Plants identification key as of November 2024, it is treated as Tylophora benthamii.
