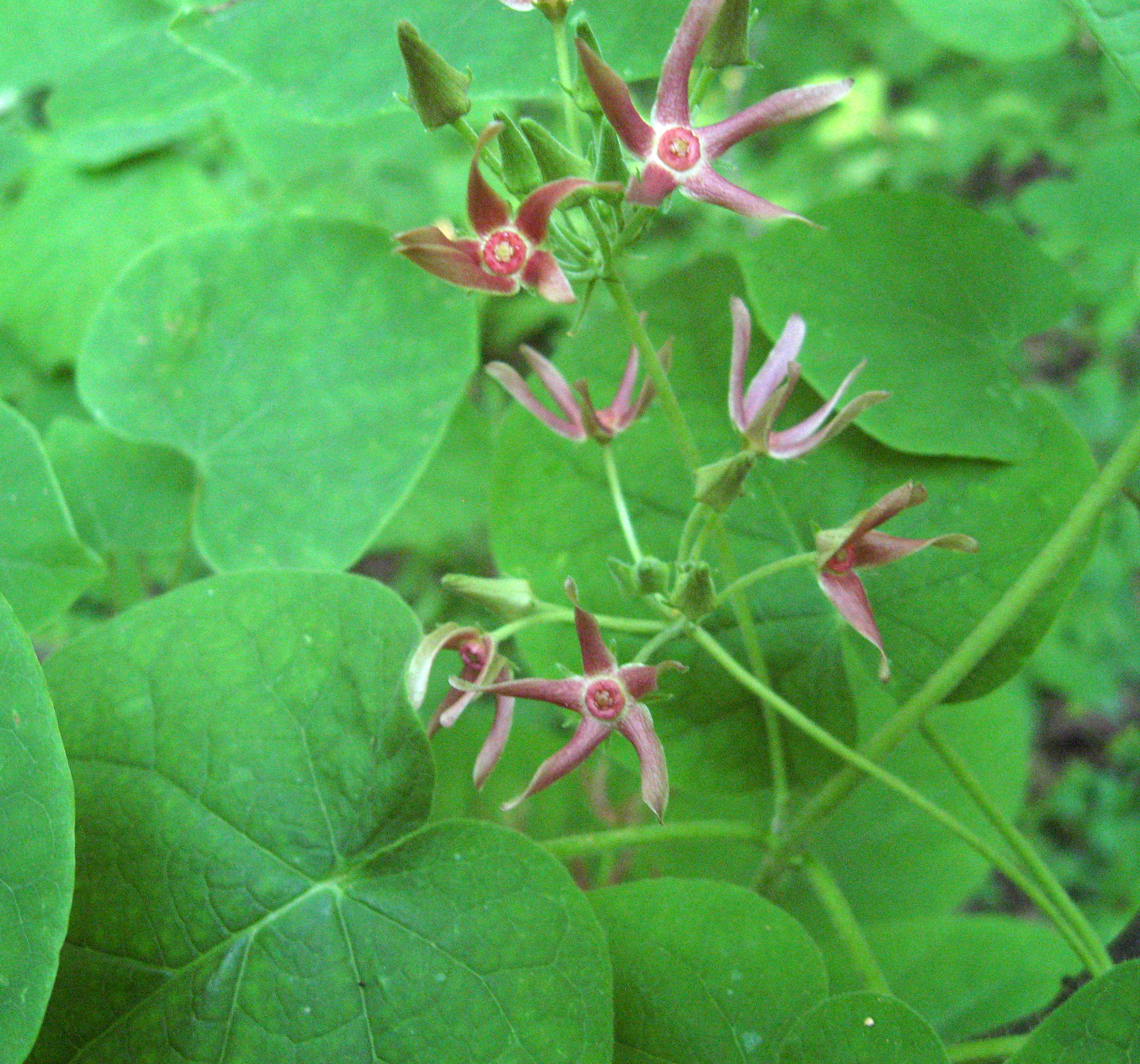

Scientific classification
- Kingdom: Plantae
- Clade: Tracheophytes
- Clade: Angiosperms
- Clade: Eudicots
- Clade: Asterids
- Order: Gentianales
- Family: Apocynaceae
- Genus: Matelea
- Species: M. obliqua

Binomial name
- Matelea obliqua (Jacq.) Woodson

= Matelea obliqua =

Species of flowering plant

Matelea obliqua, commonly known as climbing milkvine, limerock milkvine or northern spinypod, is a species of flowering plant in the dogbane family. It a twining herbaceous vine that produces maroon flowers in summer.

It is native to the eastern United States, where it is found in areas of calcareous rocky woodland. It is generally uncommon throughout its range, and is found in low densities.
