= Vincetoxicum oblongum =

Scientific classification
- Kingdom: Plantae
- Clade: Embryophytes
- Clade: Tracheophytes
- Clade: Spermatophytes
- Clade: Angiosperms
- Clade: Eudicots
- Clade: Asterids
- Order: Gentianales
- Family: Apocynaceae
- Genus: Vincetoxicum
- Species: V. oblongum

Binomial name
- Vincetoxicum oblongum (N.E.Br.) Meve & Liede

Synonyms
- Oncostemma cuspidatum K.Schum.; Secamone conostyla S.Moore; Tylophora anfracta N.E.Br.; Tylophora cuspidata (K.Schum.) Meve & Omlor, nom. illeg.; Tylophora liberica N.E.Br.; Tylophora oblonga N.E.Br.; Tylophora plagiopetala Schltr. & K.Schum.

Species of flowering plant

Vincetoxicum oblongum is a species of plants in the family Apocynaceae, native from west tropical Africa to south-west Ethiopia. Its synonyms include Oncostemma cuspidatum, at one time placed as the only species in the genus Oncostemma.

== Distribution ==
Vincetoxicum oblongum is native to tropical Africa: Benin, Burkina Faso, Cameroon, Ethiopia, Gabon, Guinea, the Gulf of Guinea Islands, Ivory Coast, Liberia and Nigeria.
