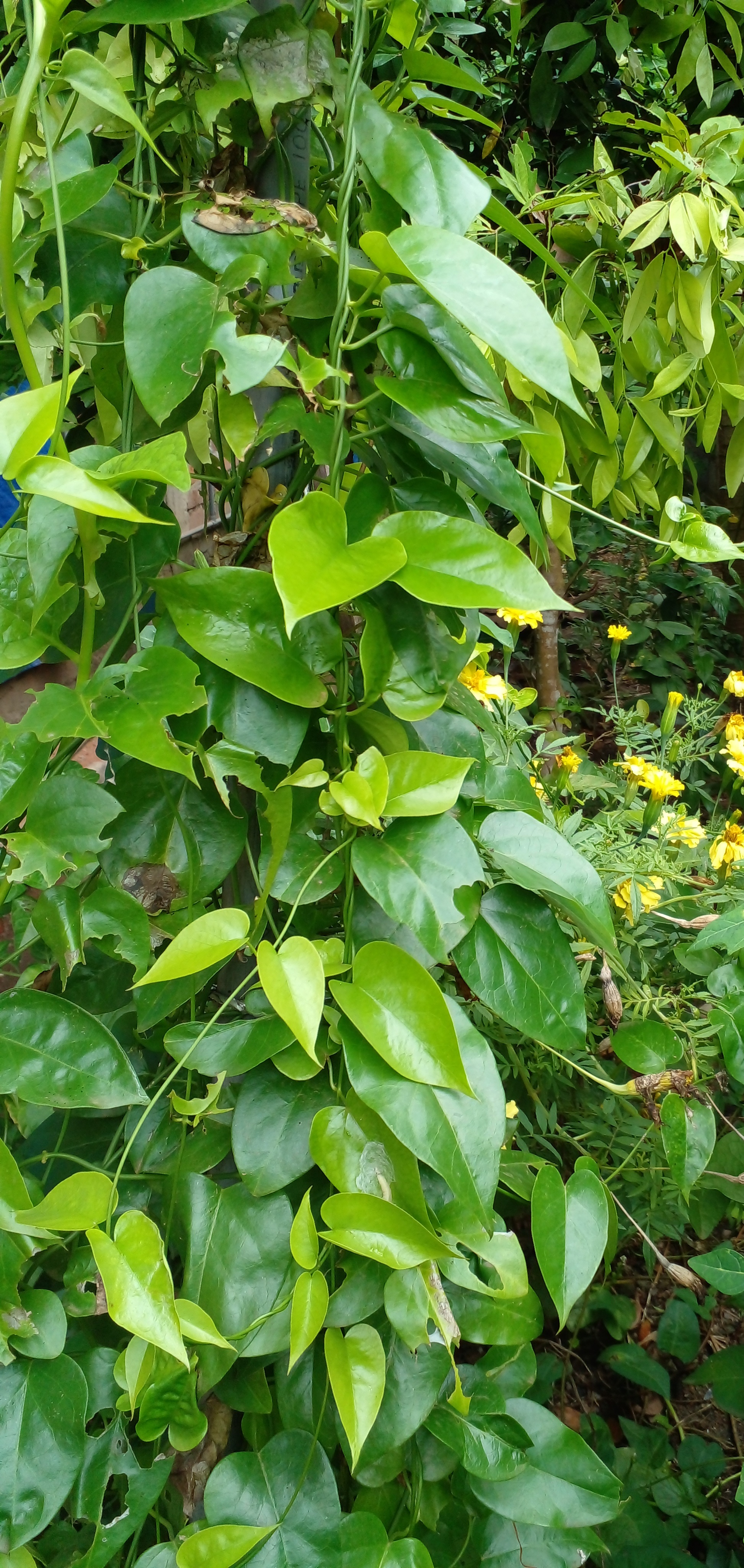

Scientific classification
- Kingdom: Plantae
- Clade: Tracheophytes
- Clade: Angiosperms
- Clade: Eudicots
- Clade: Asterids
- Order: Gentianales
- Family: Apocynaceae
- Genus: Vincetoxicum
- Species: V. bracteatum

Binomial name
- Vincetoxicum bracteatum (Thunb.) Meve & Liede

Synonyms
- Cynanchum bracteatum Thunb.; Cynanchum flavens Thunb.; Tylophora membranifolia Thwaites; Tylophora parviflora Wight, orth. var.; Tylophora pauciflora Wight & Arn.; Vincetoxicum pauciflorum (Wight & Arn.) Kuntze, nom. illeg.

= Vincetoxicum bracteatum =

Species of plant

Vincetoxicum bracteatum, synonyms including Tylophora pauciflora, is a species of climbing plant in the family Apocynaceae. It is commonly known as kiri aguna in Sri Lanka. It is edible and is used in traditional medicine. It was first described by Carl Peter Thunberg in 1821 as Cynanchum bracteatum.

== Ecology ==
Vincetoxicum bracteatum is the food plant for the larva of Parantica aglea.
