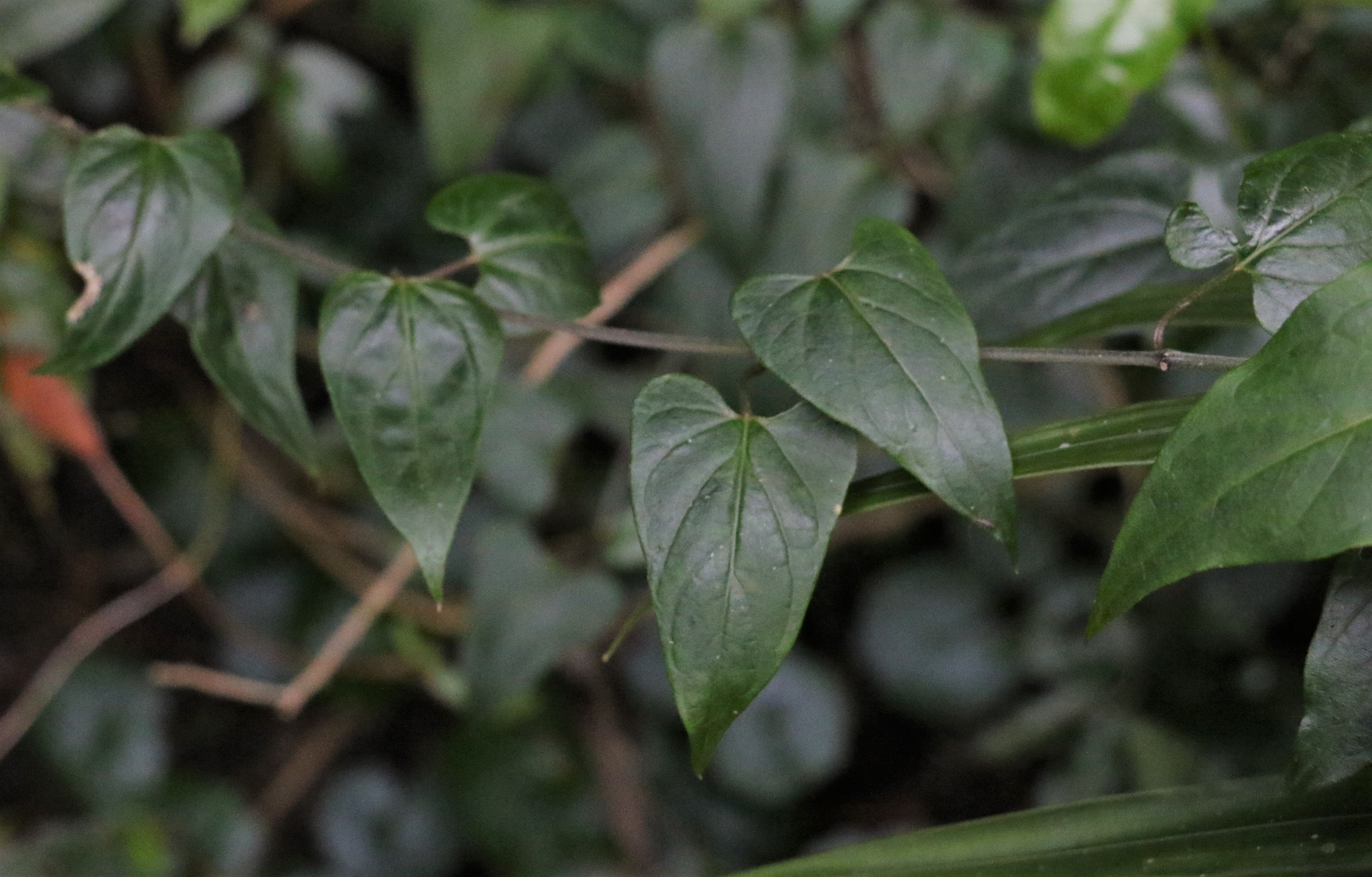

Conservation status
- Endangered (EPBC Act)

Scientific classification
- Kingdom: Plantae
- Clade: Tracheophytes
- Clade: Angiosperms
- Clade: Eudicots
- Clade: Asterids
- Order: Gentianales
- Family: Apocynaceae
- Genus: Vincetoxicum
- Species: V. woollsii

Binomial name
- Vincetoxicum woollsii (Benth.) Kuntze

Synonyms
- Tylophora woollsii

= Vincetoxicum woollsii =

Species of plant

Vincetoxicum woollsii is a small vine in the family Apocynaceae, belonging to the genus Vincetoxicum. It is a rare plant found in New South Wales and Queensland. It was declared endangered by the Nature Conservation Act of 1992.
