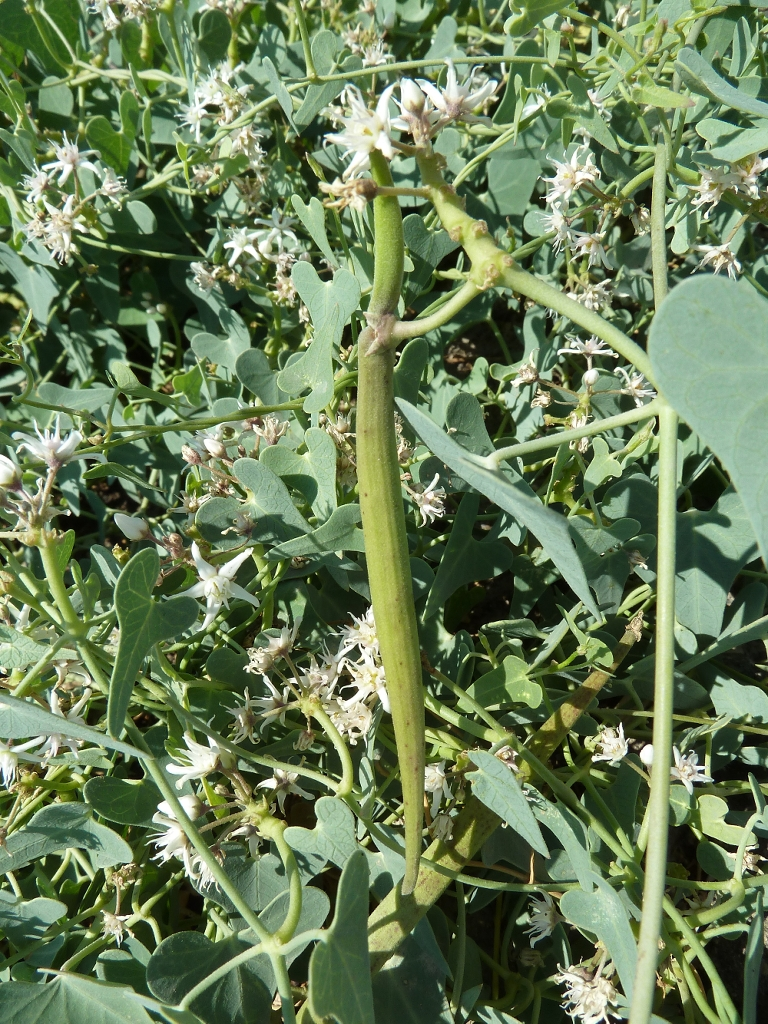

Conservation status
- Least Concern (IUCN 3.1)

Scientific classification
- Kingdom: Plantae
- Clade: Tracheophytes
- Clade: Angiosperms
- Clade: Eudicots
- Clade: Asterids
- Order: Gentianales
- Family: Apocynaceae
- Genus: Cynanchum
- Species: C. acutum

Binomial name
- Cynanchum acutum L.

Synonyms
- List: Cyathella cathayensis (Tsiang & H.T.Zhang) C.Y.Wu & D.Z.Li; Cynanchum cathayense Tsiang & H.T.Zhang; Cynanchum excelsum Desf.; Cynanchum fissum Pomel; Cynanchum hastatum Lam.; Cynanchum longifolium G.Martens; Cynanchum maritimum Salisb.; Cynanchum monspeliacum L.; Cynanchum orientale Willd. ex Spreng.; Cynanchum sibiricum Willd.; Solenostemma acutum (L.) Wehmer; Vincetoxicum acutum (L.) Kuntze; Vincetoxicum excelsum (Desf.) Kuntze

= Cynanchum acutum =

Species of plant

Cynanchum acutum is a species of climbing vine swallowworts native to Europe, Africa, and Asia.

== Taxonomy ==
Two subspecies are often distinguished:

- Cynanchum acutum subsp. acutum, Europe, Africa, western Asia
- Cynanchum acutum subsp. sibiricum, Asian
