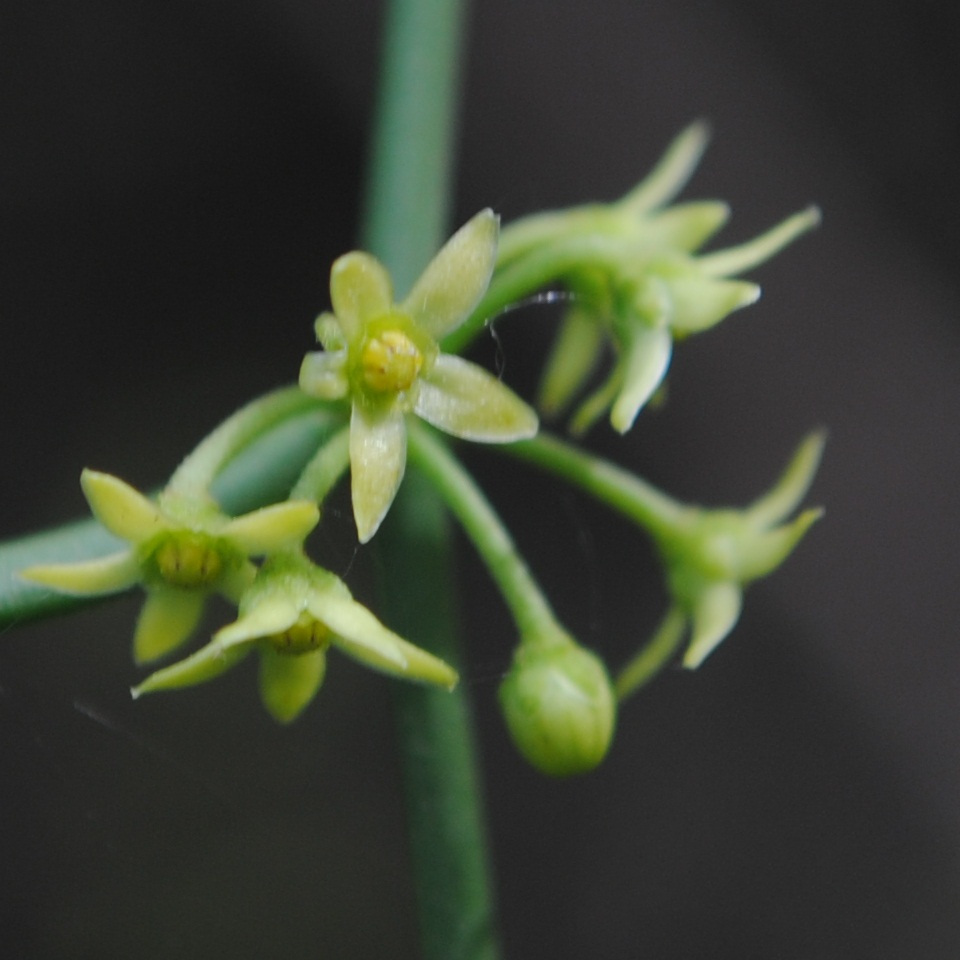

Scientific classification
- Kingdom: Plantae
- Clade: Embryophytes
- Clade: Tracheophytes
- Clade: Spermatophytes
- Clade: Angiosperms
- Clade: Eudicots
- Clade: Asterids
- Order: Gentianales
- Family: Apocynaceae
- Genus: Orthosia
- Species: O. scoparia

Binomial name
- Orthosia scoparia (Nutt.) Liede & Meve (2008)

= Orthosia scoparia =

Species of flowering plant

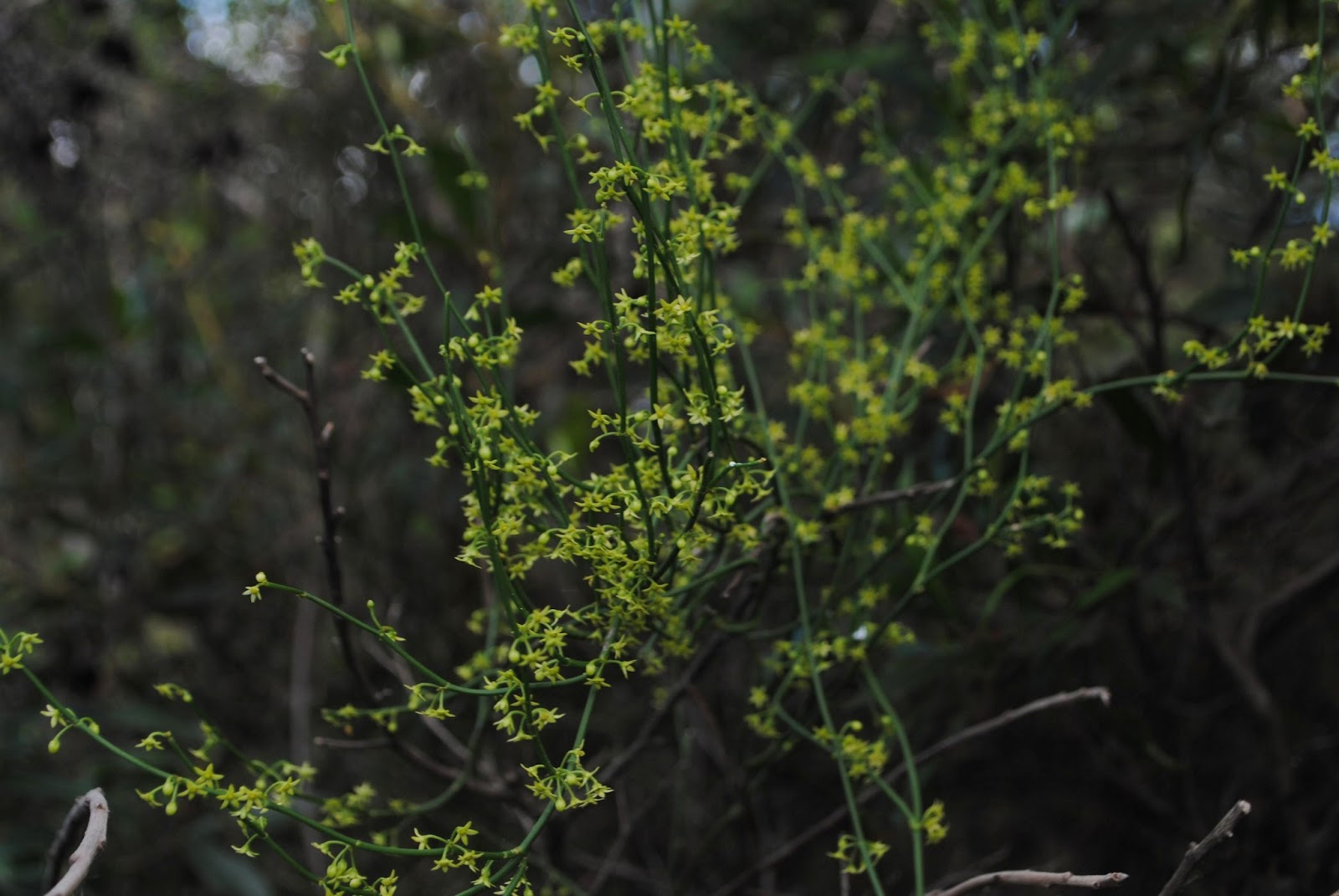

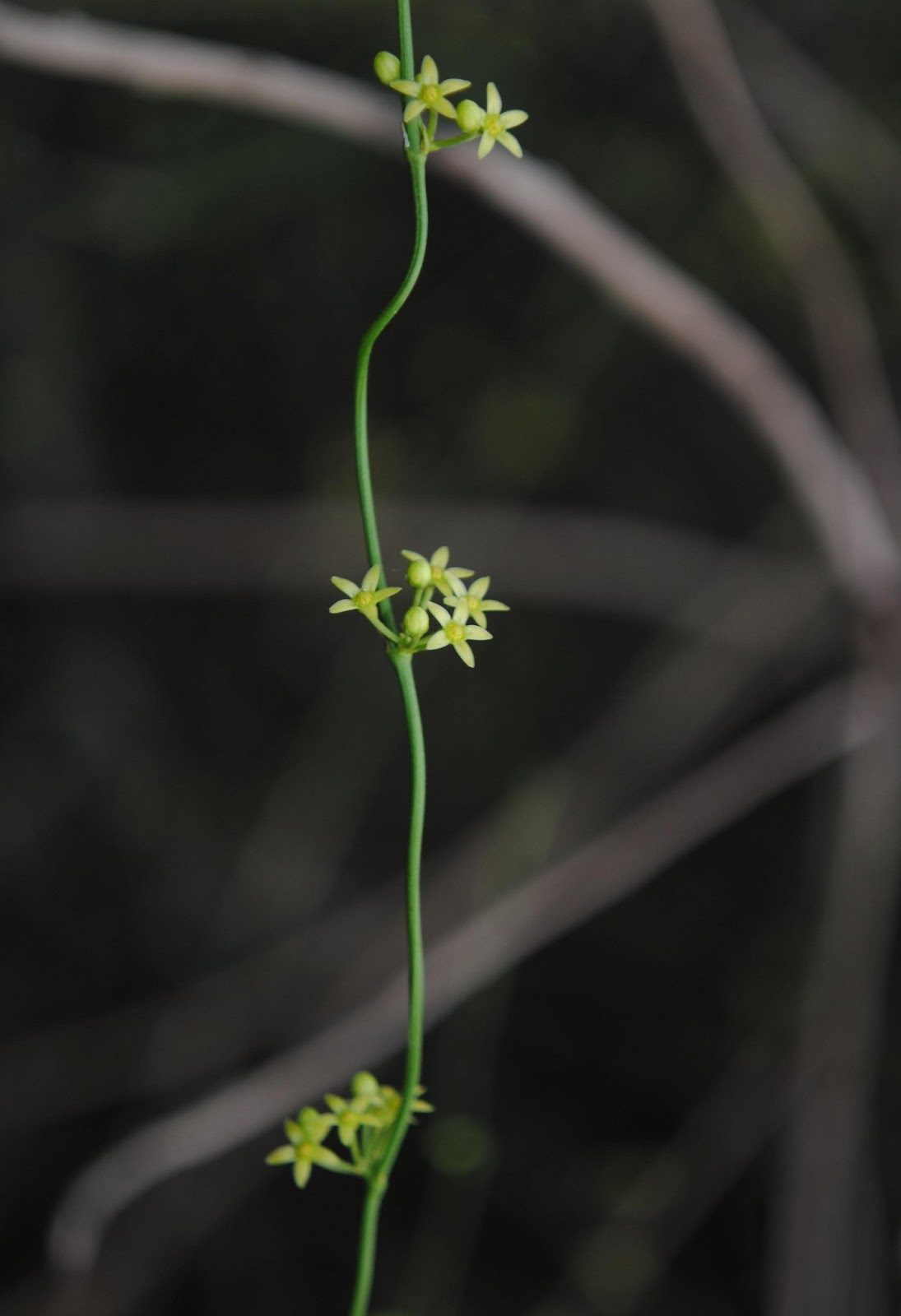

Orthosia scoparia, commonly known as the leafless swallow-wort, is a species of flowering plant in the genus Orthosia. It is an herbaceous vine with narrow opposite leaves. It is a host plant for the caterpillars of various butterfly species as well as Sephina gundlachii. It is in the Apocynaceae (Dogbane) family. It grows in the Southeastern U.S. and Caribbean and is native in the Bahamas, Cuba, Dominican Republic, Florida, Georgia, Haiti, Jamaica, Mississippi, Puerto Rico and South Carolina. A perennial it has yellowish / greenish white flowers. Caterpillars of the faithful beauty moth (Composia fidelissima) are thought to feed on it.

A climbing milkweed vine it reaches about 5 feet (1.5 m) tall. It has six homotypic synonyms and twenty heterotypic synonyms.
