= Vincetoxicum anomalum =

Scientific classification
- Kingdom: Plantae
- Clade: Tracheophytes
- Clade: Angiosperms
- Clade: Eudicots
- Clade: Asterids
- Order: Gentianales
- Family: Apocynaceae
- Genus: Vincetoxicum
- Species: V. anomalum

Binomial name
- Vincetoxicum anomalum (N.E.Br.) Meve & Liede

Synonyms
- Cynanchum chirindense S.Moore; Cynanchum papillosum Weim.; Tylophora anomala N.E.Br.; Tylophora mayottae W.D.Stevens, Labat & F.Barthelat; Tylophora urceolata Meve

Species of plant

Vincetoxicum anomalum is a species of flowering plant in the family Apocynaceae, native to the island of Bioko and Cameroon in the west of Africa, and from Uganda to KwaZulu-Natal and the island of Mayotte in the east of Africa. It was first described by N. E. Brown in 1908 as Tylophora anomala.

== Distribution ==
Vincetoxicum anomalum has a discontinuous distribution. In the west of Africa, it is native to the island of Bioko and to Cameroon. In the west of Africa, it is native to Kenya, KwaZulu-Natal, Malawi, Mozambique, Tanzania, Uganda, Zambia and Zimbabwe, and to the island of Mayotte in the Mozambique Channel.

== Conservation ==
Tylophora urceolata was assessed as "vulnerable" in the 2000 IUCN Red List, where it is said to be native only to Bioko, Cameroon and Tanzania. As of February 2023, T. urceolata was regarded as a synonym of Vincetoxicum anomalum, which has a wider distribution.
