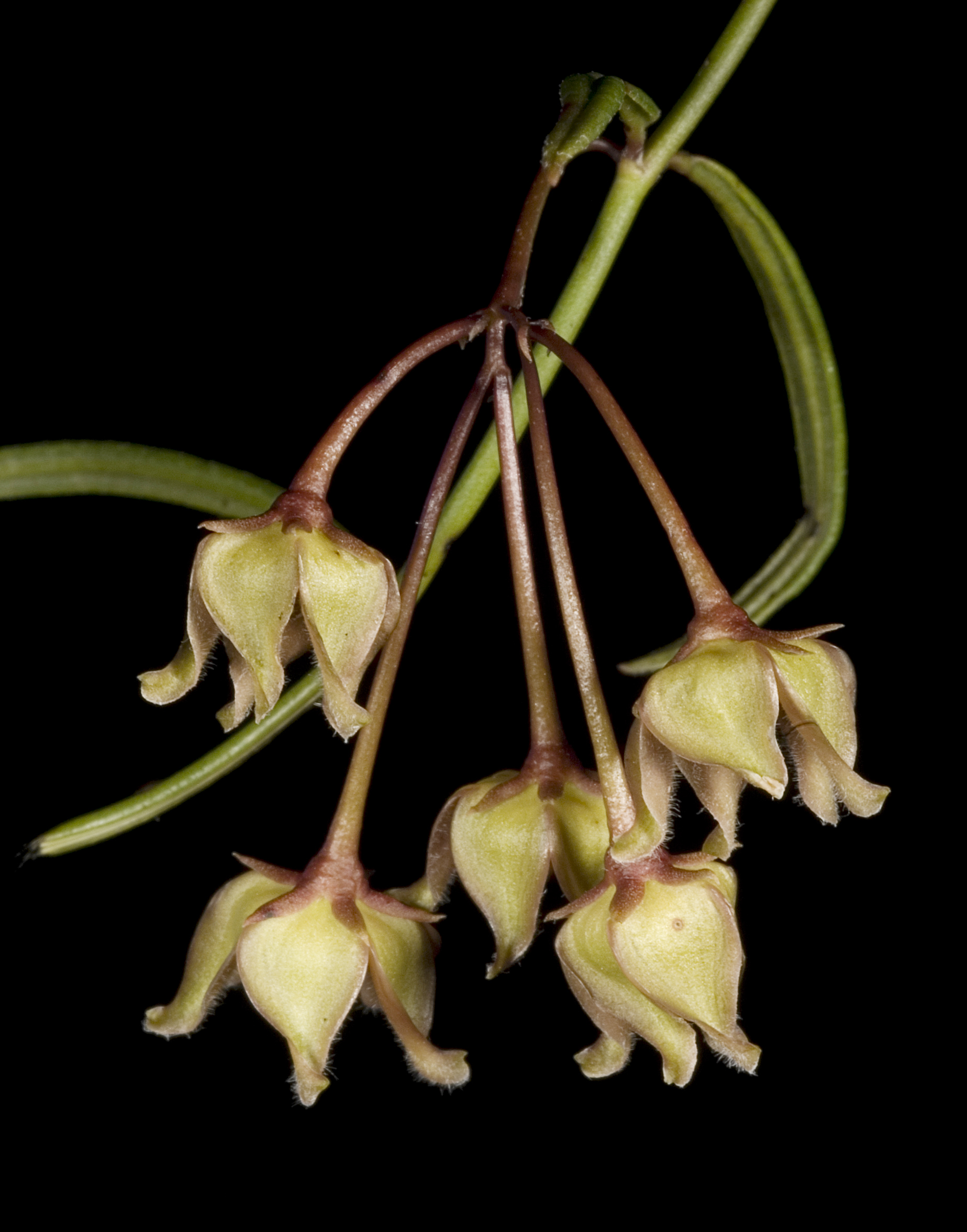

Scientific classification
- Kingdom: Plantae
- Clade: Tracheophytes
- Clade: Angiosperms
- Clade: Eudicots
- Clade: Asterids
- Order: Gentianales
- Family: Apocynaceae
- Genus: Vincetoxicum
- Species: V. lineare

Binomial name
- Vincetoxicum lineare (Decne.) Meve & Liede

Synonyms
- Doemia atropurpurea (F.Muell.) F.Muell.; Doemia kempeana (F.Muell.) F.Muell.; Doemia linearis (Decne.) F.Muell.; Doemia quinquepartita (F.Muell.) F.Muell.; Pentatropis atropurpurea (F.Muell.) Benth.; Pentatropis kempeana F.Muell.; Pentatropis linearis Decne.; Pentatropis quinquepartita (F.Muell.) Benth.; Rhyncharrhena atropurpurea F.Muell.; Rhyncharrhena linearis (Decne.) K.L.Wilson; Rhyncharrhena quinquepartita F.Muell.

= Vincetoxicum lineare =

Species of plant

Vincetoxicum lineare is a species of plant in the family Apocynaceae native to Australia. Known as the bush bean, it is an edible species of plant found in arid regions. As Rhyncharrhena linearis, the species was at one time the only species in the monotypic genus Rhyncharrhena.

== Description ==
The habit of the slender plant is a climber or trailer, with stems obtaining a length around two metres. The flowers appear throughout the year, except during February to March, the purple brown colour beginning as a greenish yellow. The margin of the corolla is often hairy, the lobes are deeply divided. Three to seven umbels appear in an axial arrangement, from which a twenty centimetre pod is produced.

== Taxonomy ==
The species was first described by Joseph Decaisne in 1844 as Pentatropis linearis. Three species which Ferdinand von Mueller later described, Rhyncharrhena atropurpurea and Rh. quinquepartita in 1859 and Pentatropis kempeana in 1882, are considered to be synonyms. As Rhyncharrhena linearis, the species was at one time the only species in the monotypic genus Rhyncharrhena.

== Uses ==
The species is noted as an ancient food source of the peoples inhabiting the drier regions of Australia. All parts of the plant are known to edible, but the stem is not regularly consumed. The plant has a low nutritional value, although a source of vitamin C.
