= List of wort plants =

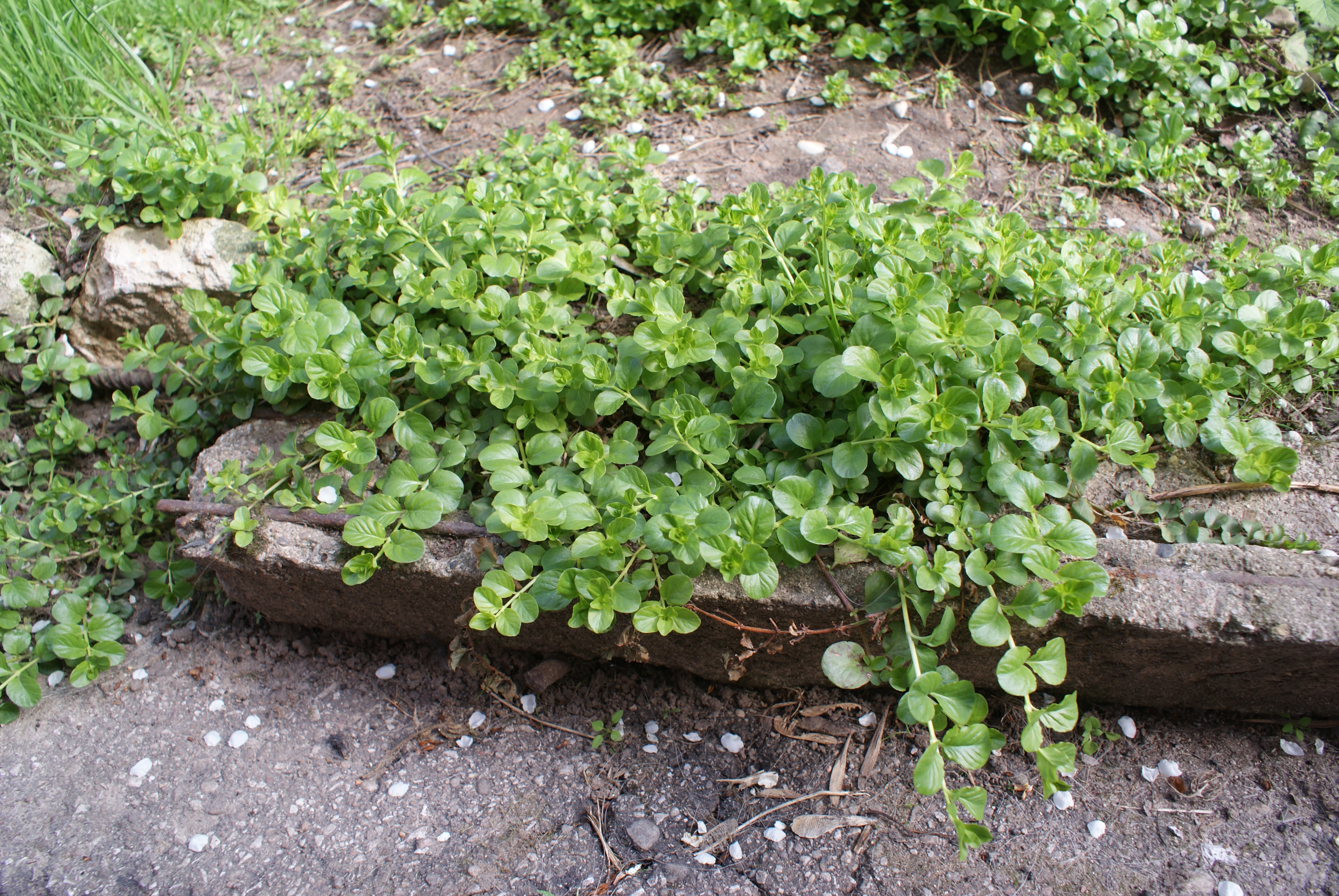
Moneywort, Lysimachia nummularia

This is an alphabetical listing of wort plants, meaning plants that employ the syllable wort in their English-language common names.

According to the Oxford English Dictionary's Ask Oxford site, "A word with the suffix -wort is often very old. The Old English word was wyrt. The modern variation, root, comes from Old Norse. It was often used in the names of herbs and plants that had medicinal uses, the first part of the word denoting the complaint against which it might be specially efficacious. By the middle of the 17th-century -wort was beginning to fade from everyday use.

The Naturalist Newsletter states, "Wort derives from the Old English wyrt, which simply meant plant. The word goes back even further, to the common ancestor of English and German, to the Germanic wurtiz. Wurtiz also evolved into the modern German word Wurzel, meaning root."

== Wort plants ==
Adderwort, adder's wort – Persicaria bistorta.
American lungwort – Mertensia virginica.
Asterwort – Any composite plant of the family Asteraceae.
Awlwort – Subularia aquatica. The plant bears awl-shaped leaves.
Banewort – Ranunculus flammula or Atropa belladonna
Barrenwort – Epimedium, especially Epimedium alpinum.
Bearwort – Meum athamanticum
Bellwort – Uvularia or plants in the family Campanulaceae.
Birthwort – Aristolochia. Also, birthroot (Trillium erectum).
Birthwort – Aristolochiaceae, the birthwort family.
Bishop's wort – Stachys officinalis. Also, fennel flower.
Bitterwort – Gentiana lutea.
Bladderwort – Utricularia (aquatic plants).
Blawort – A flower, commonly called harebell. Also, a certain plant bearing blue flowers.
Bloodwort – Sanguinaria canadensis. Produces escharotic alkaloids that corrode skin, leaving wounds. More commonly known as bloodroot, or sometimes tetterwort.
Blue navelwort – Cynoglossum omphaloides
Blue throatwort – Trachelium caeruleum.
Blushwort – A member of the gentian family. Shame flower.
Bogwort – The bilberry or whortleberry.
Bollockwort – A Middle English name for certain orchids, from their paired "bollock" or testicle-shaped tubers.
Boragewort – Any plant of the borage family, Boraginaceae.
Bridewort – Filipendula ulmaria and Spiraea spp., also known as meadowsweet.
Brimstonewort – Same as sulphurwort.
Brotherwort – Wild thyme.
Brownwort – Scrophularia vernalis, also known as yellow figwort
Bruisewort – Any plant considered to be useful in treating bruises, as herb Margaret.
Bullwort – Ammi majus. Bishop's wood.
Bullock's or Cow's Lungwort – Verbascum thapsus, the common Mullein.
Burstwort – Herniaria glabra. Formerly used to treat rupture.
Butterwort – Pinguicula vulgaris. Other species of Pinguicula have "butterwort" in their English names.
Cancerwort – Linaria vulgaris. Toadflax. Also includes some members of the Kickxia genus.
Catwort – A plant of the genus Nepeta. Catnip.
Clown's Ringwort – plant featured in the 1605 panel of the New World Tapestry.
Colewort – Brassica oleracea. Cabbage.
Coralwort – Tooth violet.
Crosswort – Eupatorium perfoliatum. Lysimachia quadrifolia. Boneset. Also, maywort, a species of Galium, and species of Phuopsis.
Damewort – Hesperis matronalis. Dame's violet or damask violet or rocket.
Danewort – Sambucus ebulus. The dwarf elder. Also, daneweed.
Dragonwort – An Artemisia, or Polygonum bistorta.
Dropwort – Filipendula vulgaris, Oenanthe, Oxypolis, Tiedemannia
Dungwort – Helleborus foetidus. Stinking hellebore.
Ebony spleenwort – Fern.
Elderwort – Sambucus ebulus.
European Pillwort – Pilularia globulifera. Peppergrass.
Felonwort – Solanum dulcamara. Felonwood or bittersweet.
Feltwort – Another common name for the Mullein, the genus Verbascum.
Felwort – A common name for various species of gentian.
Feverwort – Horse gentian.
Figwort – Some plants in the family Scrophulariaceae, including Euphrasia officinalis (eyebright); Veronica officinalis (speedwell or fluellen); Veronica anagullis (water speedwell); Gratiola officinalis (herb of grace) (hedge hyssop); Herpestis monniera (water hyssop); Scoparia dulcis (sweet broomweed), or Ilysanthes riparia (false pimpernel). Also the Cape figwort, Phygelius capensis.
Fleawort – A plantain. Also some composites, such as the Marsh Fleawort.
Flukewort – Hydrocotyle vulgaris.
French or golden lungwort – Hieracium murorum.
Frostwort – Helianthemum canadenes. Frostweed or rockrose.
Fumewort – Genus Corydalis.
Galewort – Myrica gale. Sweet gale.
Garlicwort – Alliaria officinalis. The hedge garlic.
Gentianwort – Any plant of the family Gentianaceae.
German Madwort – Asperugo procumbens.
Gipsywort – Any plant of the genus Lycopus, as Lycopus europaeus. Gipsy herb.
Glasswort – Any plant of the genus Salicornia. Frog grass. Also, a seaweed yielding kelp.
Golden ragwort – Senecio aureus. Squawweed.
Goutwort – Aegopodium podagraria. Acheweed; Herb Gerard; Goat's foot; Bishop weed; Goutweed.
Greater Spearwort – Ranunculus lingua.
Squinancywort – Cynanchica pyrenaica.
Gutwort – Globularia alypum. Used as a purgative.
Hammerwort – Parietaria officinalis. The plant pellitory.
Hartwort – Any of certain plants of the genera Seseli, Tordylium, and Bupleurum.
Heathwort – Any plant of the genus Erica, the heath family.
Hemlock dropwort – Oenanthe fistulosa. A plant of the parsley family, Apiaceae or Umbelliferae.
Hillwort – Wild thyme, or Mentha pulegium, a kind of pennyroyal.
Hogwort – Croton capitatus. J. K. Rowling named Hogwarts School of Witchcraft and Wizardry after this plant (although she misspelled it).
Holewort – Hollowwort. Corydalis cava.
Honewort – A plant used as a remedy for hone.
Honeywort – A bee plant of the genus Cerinthe.
Hoodwort – Scutellaria lateriflora. Also called skullcap and madweed.
Hornwort – plants in the bryophyte genus Ceratophyllum, such as Rigid Hornwort.
Ironwort – A plant of the genus Sideritis.
Kelpwort – Macrocystis pyrifera, a kind of glasswort.
Kidneywort – Cotyledon umbilicus. Also called pennywort and navelwort.
Knotwort – Any plant of the genus Illecebrum.
Laserwort – Any plant of the genus Laserpitium.
Lazarwort – Laserwort.
Leadwort – Any plant of the genus Plumbago.
Lesser Spearwort – Ranunculus flammula. Banewort.
Lichwort – The wall pellitory, Parietaria officinalis.
Lilywort – A plant of the genus Funkia. Day lily. Also, any plant of the genus Liliaceae.
Liverwort – Any species of Marchantiophyta, a division of non-vascular plants (a type of bryophyte). Also, plants that resemble the liverworts; as, liverleaf (Hepatica).
Lousewort – Pedicularis canadensis. Cockscomb; head betony; wood betony (herb Christopher). Any plant of the genus Pedicularis, as Pedicularis palustris (marsh lousewort).
Lungwort – A plant of the genus Mertensia, the lungworts. Also, a boraginaceous plant of the genus Pulmonaria.
Lustwort – Any plant of the genus Drosera; the sundew.
Madderwort – Any plant of the madder family, Rubiaceae.
Madwort – Alyssum saxitile. Gold-dust.
Maidenhair spleenwort – Asplenium trichomanes
Mallowwort – Any plant of the mallow family, Malvaceae.
Marsh Pennywort – Hydrocotyle vulgaris.
Marsh St.-John's-wort – Elodes virginica.
Marshwort – Vaccinium Oxycoccus, the creeping cranberry. Also, a European umbelliferous plant.
Masterwort – Peucedanum (formerly Imperatoria) Ostruthium or Astrantia major. Also, in the United States, Heracleum lanatum, the cow parsnip.
Maudlinwort – Leucanthemum vulgare.
Maywort – Bedstraw or mugweed. A species of Galium. Also, crosswort, Lysimachia quadrifolia.
Meadowwort – Filipendula, Spiraea
Milkwort – Polygalaceae, the milkwort family, one of which yields buaze. Polygala vulgaris is the milkwort of Europe.
Miterwort or mitrewort (British) – Bishop's cap. Any plant of the genus Mitella.
Moneywort – loosestrife. Herb twopence, an evergreen trailing plant. A popular name for various plants of the genus Lysimachia, especially Lysimachia nummularia, of the primrose family, Primulaceae.
Moonwort – Honesty, a herb of the genus Lunaria. Also, any fern of the genus Botrychium.
Motherwort – A herb, Leonurus cardiaca, of the mint family, Lamiaceae. Also, mugwort.
Mountain spiderwort – Lloydia serotina.
Mudwort – Limosella aquatica, found growing in muddy places.
Mugwort – Artemisia vulgaris.
Mulewort – Any plant of the genus Hemionitis.
Nailwort – Any species of Paronychia. Also Draba verna, Saxifraga tridactylites.
Navelwort – Plants in the genera Cotyledon and Omphalodes.
Nettlewort – Any plant of the nettle family, Urticaceae.
Nipplewort – Lapsana communis.
Peachwort – Lady's Thumb, Polygonum persicaria.
Pearlwort – Pearl grass; pearl plant; any species of the genus Sagina.
Pennywort – Linaria cymbalaria. Also, any one of a number of peltate-leaved plants. Watercup; trumpetleaf. Also Gotu Kola (Centella asiatica) and species from genus Hydrocotyle.
Pepperwort – Lepidium latifolium; Lepidium campestre; Spanish cress, Lepidium cardamines. Peppergrass; cockweed; dittander; Marsilea minuta
Peterwort – Saint Peter's wort.
Pilewort – Lesser celandine.
Pipewort – Eriocaulon.
Quillwort – Isoetes, of the quillwort family; certain seedless plants or "fern allies".
Quinsywort – Asperula cynanchica.
Common ragwort – Jacobaea vulgaris, and some other plants of the genus Jacobaea (once called cankerweed).
Rattlewort – rattlebox, Crotalaria sagittalis.
Ribwort – Plantago lanceolata. Hen plant. English plantain, the common plantain introduced into the United States from Europe.
Rosewort – A plant of the rose family, Rosaceae. Also, roseroot, Rhodiola rosea, whose root has the fragrance of a rose.
Rupturewort – Alternanthera polygonoides. Also species of Herniaria, such as Smooth Rupturewort, H. glabra.
Saltwort – A vague and indefinite name applied to any halophyte of the genus Salsola. Salsola kali is the prickly saltwort. Also, some species of Salicornia, the glassworts, are called saltworts.
Sandwort – A plant of the genus Arenaria. One of the Caryophyllaceae.
Sawwort – A plant of the genus Serratula, especially Serratula tinctoria. Also, plants in the genus Saussurea.
Scorpionwort – either Ornithopus scorpioides or scorpion grass, the forget-me-not.
Scurvywort – Lesser celandine.
Sea Lungwort – Mertensia maritima.
Sea Milkwort – Of the primrose family, Primulaceae.
Sea ragwort – Dusty miller, Jacobaea maritima.
Sea sandwort – A plant of the North Atlantic seacoast.
Sea starwort – Tripolium pannonicum (syn. Aster tripolium).
Setterwort – Helleborus foetidus. Pegroots; setter grass; bear's foot.
Sicklewort – Prunella vulgaris, the healall.
Sleepwort – Lettuce, especially Lactuca virosa
Slipperwort – A plant of the genus Calceolaria.
Sneezewort – Achillea ptarmica. Goosetongue; Bastard pellitory.
Soapwort – One of the bruiseworts.
Sparrowwort – A general name for the plants of the genus Passerina
Spearwort – A plant of the genus Ranunculus.
Spiderwort – Tradescantia virginica. Also species in the genus Commelina, such as Blue Spiderwort, C. coelestis.
Spleenwort – Asplenium. A large genus of ferns; formerly used for spleen disorders.
Spoonwort – Any plant of the genus Cochlearia, as Cochlearia officinalis. Scurvy grass.
Springwort – Euphorbia lathyris. Caper spurge.
Spurwort – Sherardia arvensis. Field madder.
Stabwort – Wood sorrel, Oxalis acetosella.
Staggerwort – Same as Staverwort .
Staithwort – Same as colewort.
Standerwort – Standergrass, Orchis mascula.
Starwort – Any plant of the genus Aster.
Staverwort – Staggerwort; ragwort, Jacobaea vulgaris.
Stinkwort – Various plants including Helleborus foetidus, the stinking hellebore; Dittrichia graveolens and Inula graveolens; and Datura stramonium, jimson weed.
Stitchwort – Any of several plants of the genus Stellaria. Stichwort.
St. James' Wort – Senecio jacobaea or Senecio aureus, two species of ragwort.
St. John's Wort – Can refer to any species of Hypericum.
Stonewort – A general name for plants of the genus Chara and Nitella; water horsetail.
St. Paul's Wort – species of the genus Sigesbeckia, such as Eastern St Paul's-wort, Sigesbeckia orientalis.
St. Peter's Wort – Any plant of the genus Ascyrum, such as Hypericum quadrangulum.
Strapwort – Corrigiola litoralis.
Sulphurwort – Peucedanum officinale. Hog fennel.
Swallowwort – The Greater Celandine, Chelidonium majus. Also, any plant of the genus Asclepias or Cynanchum. Black Swallow-wort is Vincetoxicum nigrum.
Sweetwort – Any plant of a sweet taste.
Talewort – Borago officinalis. Formerly considered a valuable remedy.
Tetterwort – According to 1913 Webster's Dictionary, Chelidonium majus in England or Sanguinaria canadensis in the Americas. Used to treat tetter.
Thoroughwort – Eupatorium perfoliatum. Boneset.
Throatwort – A name for one or two plants of the genus Campanula.
Thrumwort – Amaranthus caudatus; velvet flower or love-lies-bleeding.
Toothwort – Cardamine, Lathraea squamaria, and Lathraea clandestina
Towerwort – the tower mustard and some allied species of Arabis.
Tree lungwort – Lobaria pulmonaria, a lichen.
Trophywort – The Indian cress; nasturtium, Tropaeolum majus.
Umbrellawort – A plant of the genus Mirabilis or Tauschia.
Venus's-navelwort – Either blue navelwort or white navelwort.
Wall Pennywort – Umbilicus rupestris.
Wartwort – Euphorbia helioscopia An attractive European weed which has flowers that turn towards the sun.
Water dropwort – Any plant in the Oenanthe genus, so-called because of the resemblance of some species to dropwort, Filipendula vulgari (see above).
Water figwort – Water betony.
Water pennywort – Hydrocotyle; marsh pennyworts.
Water starwort – Callitriche verna, of the water-milfoil family, and other species of the genus Callitriche, such as Common Water-starwort, Callitriche stagnalis.
Waterwort – An aquatic plant of the genus Elatine. Any plant of the family Philydraceae.
White navelwort – A plant of the genus Omphalodes.
White Swallowwort – Vincetoxicum officinale.
Willowwort – Any plant of the willow family, Salicaceae. A species of Lythrum. Grasspoly; a variety of loosestrife.
Woundwort – The name of several plants of the genus Stachys, a genus of labiate plants. Also, Anthyllis vulneraria and Achillea millefolium.
Yellow starwort – Elecampane, Inula helenium.
Yellow-wort – Chlora perfoliata, Gentianaceae
