= Stinkwort =

Stinkwort is the common name given to plants of several species:

- Datura stramonium L., family Solanaceae
- Dittrichia graveolens (L.) W. Greuter, genus Dittrichia (formerly Inula graveolens (L.) Desf, genus Inula), family Asteraceae
- Helleborus fœtidus L., family Ranunculaceae

== See also ==
- Stenchwort
