= Swallowwort =

Swallowwort or swallow-wort is a common name for several plants and plant families. The term may be a description of poisonous effects, or indicate that a plant was formerly used medicinally for tonsillitis.

It may refer to:

- Any of several vines of the genus Vincetoxicum, especially white swallowwort (Vincetoxicum hirundinaria), black swallowwort (Vincetoxicum nigrum), and pale swallowwort (Vincetoxicum rossicum)
- Any of several vines of the genus Cynanchum. Cynanchum is from Greek words meaning "to choke a dog."
- Greater celandine (Chelidonium majus).
- Greater celandine and swallowwort were each often categorized with tetterworts because they were used to treat tetter. This led to nomenclature confusion among these worts.
- many plants of the genus Asclepias
- Euphorbia maculata
- Seutera angustifolia, a plant of the genus Seutera
