= Wretton =

Village in Norfolk, England

Coordinates: 52.5723°N 0.4925°E

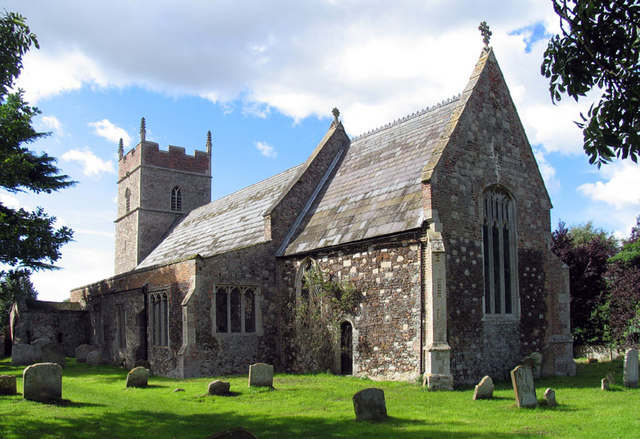
- All Saints, Wretton

- Location within Norfolk
- Area: 4.70 km^{2} (1.81 sq mi)
- Population: 369 (2011)
  - Density: 79/km^{2} (200/sq mi)
- OS grid reference: TF689001
- Civil parish: Wretton
- District: King's Lynn and West Norfolk
- Shire county: Norfolk
- Region: East
- Country: England
- Sovereign state: United Kingdom
- Post town: King's Lynn
- Postcode district: PE33
- Dialling code: 01366
- Police: Norfolk
- Fire: Norfolk
- Ambulance: East of England
- UK Parliament: South West Norfolk

Wretton is a village and civil parish in the English county of Norfolk. It covers an area of 4.7 km^{2} (1.8 sq mi) and had a population of 392 in 155 households at the 2001 census. For the purposes of local government, it falls within the district of King's Lynn and West Norfolk.

The villages name means "Crosswort/hellebore farm/settlement".

It is situated 4 miles (6.4 km) east of Downham Market, 16 miles (26 km) south of King's Lynn and 40 miles (64 km) west of Norwich. Also 1.5 miles (2.4 km) North of the larger village of Stoke Ferry.
