= Ethmia candidella =

Scientific classification
- Domain: Eukaryota
- Kingdom: Animalia
- Phylum: Arthropoda
- Class: Insecta
- Order: Lepidoptera
- Family: Depressariidae
- Genus: Ethmia
- Species: E. candidella

Binomial name
- Ethmia candidella (Alpheraky, 1908)

Synonyms
- Psecadia pusiella var. candidella Alphéraky, 1908; Psecadia pusiella var. orientella Caradja, 1931

Species of moth

Ethmia candidella is a moth in the family Depressariidae. It is found in North Africa, southern Europe and the Middle East.

This is a species present in the territory of Armenia, specifically, firsthandly observed in Yerevan in 2023 October.

The larvae of subspecies candidella feed on Lithospermum species (including Lithospermum purpurocaeruleum), Cerinthe major, Borago officinalis and Asperugo procumbens, while the larvae of subspecies wiltshirei have only been recorded on Asperugo procumbens.

== Subspecies ==
- Ethmia candidella candidella (Morocco, western Algeria, Spain, southern France, Switzerland, Italy, Austria, Hungary, Macedonia, S.Russia, Asia Minor, Syria, Palestine, Iraq, Transcaspia)
- Ethmia candidella delicatella de Lattin, 1963 (Algeria, Tunisia)
- Ethmia candidella wiltshirei de Lattin, 1963 (north-western Iran)
- Ethmia candidella farinatella de Lattin, 1963 (Turkestan)
