= Stitchwort =

Stitchwort is the common name of over 190 plants of the following genera:

- Minuartia
- Stellaria

== See also ==
- Wort plants
