= Madwort =

Madwort is a common name for several plants and may refer to:

- Asperugo procumbens, native to Europe
- Alyssum
