= Woundwort =

Woundwort is the common name for several species of plants and may refer to:

- Family Lamiaceae:
  - Numerous plants of the genus Stachys
    - Stachys arvensis, field woundwort
    - Stachys sylvatica, hedge woundwort
    - Stachys palustris, marsh woundwort
  - Prunella vulgaris, an herbaceous plant in the genus Prunella
- Family Asteraceae:
  - Achillea millefolium, a flowering plant in the family Asteraceae
  - Bellis perennis, a common European species of daisy
  - Solidago virgaurea, an herbaceous perennial plant of the family Asteraceae
- Family Fabaceae:
  - Anthyllis vulneraria, a medicinal plant native to Europe

== Other ==
- Woundwort Marble

== See also ==
- General Woundwort, a fictional rabbit in Watership Down by Richard Adams
