= Fleawort =

Fleawort is a common name for several plants and may refer to:

- Plantago species, especially:
  - Plantago psyllium, "fleawort"
- Senecio species, especially:
  - Senecio integrifolius, "field fleawort"
- Conyza canadensis, "Canadian fleabane", native to North America and Central America
- Inula conyza
