= Crosswort =

Crosswort is a common name for several species of plants and may refer to:

- Crucianella stylosa (Rubiaceae)
- Cruciata laevipes (Rubiaceae)
- Lysimachia quadrifolia (Primulaceae, formerly Myrsinaceae), native to the eastern United States and Canada
