= Honewort =

Honewort may refer to either of two species of plants in the carrot family:

- Trinia glauca, native to Eurasia
- Cryptotaenia canadensis, native to eastern North America
