= Toothwort =

Toothwort is a common name for several plants and may refer to:

- Cardamine, a genus of plants in the mustard family, Brassicaceae
- Lathraea, a genus of parasitic plants in the family Orobanchaceae native to Europe and Asia
