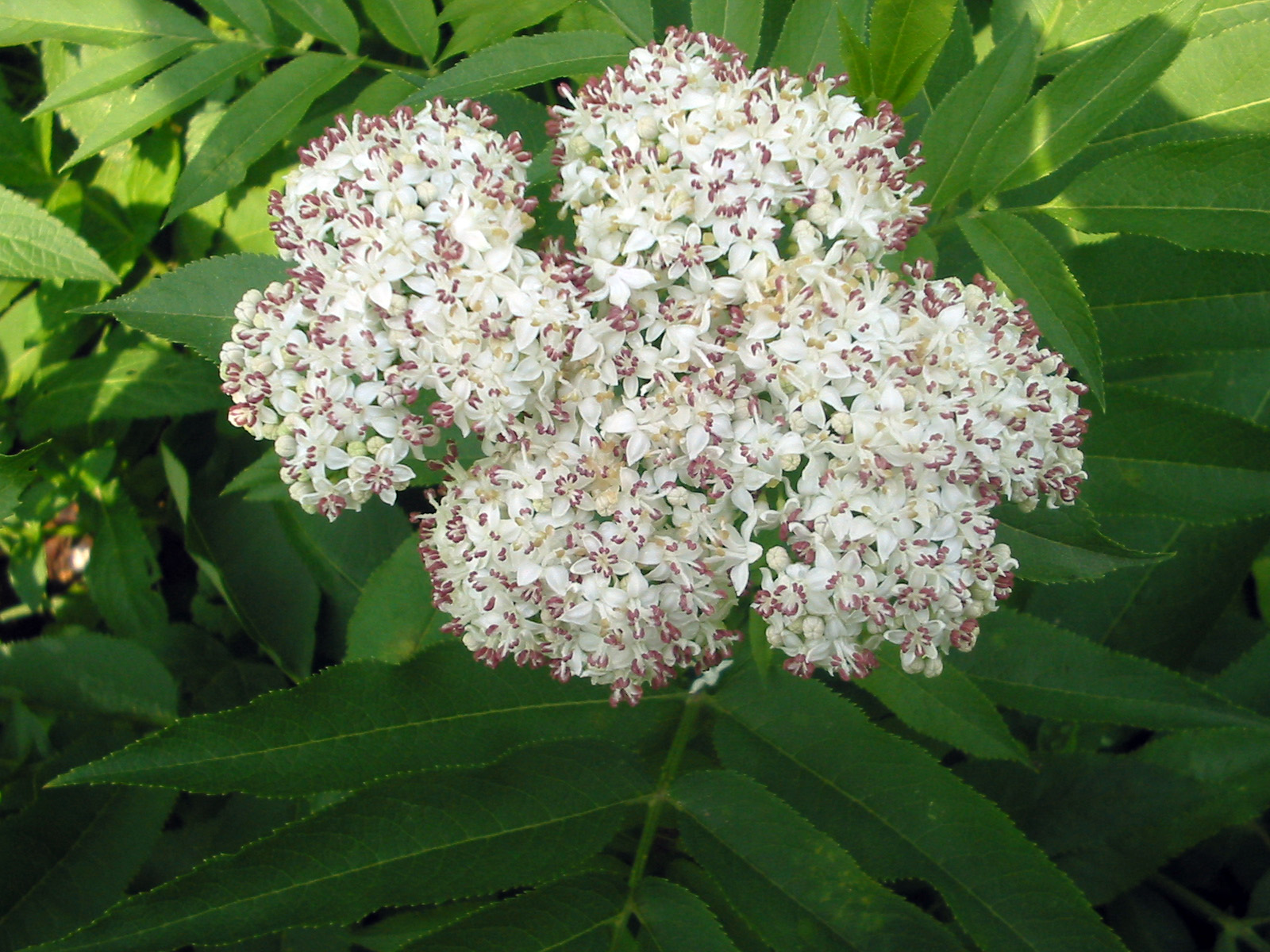
- Danewort inflorescence
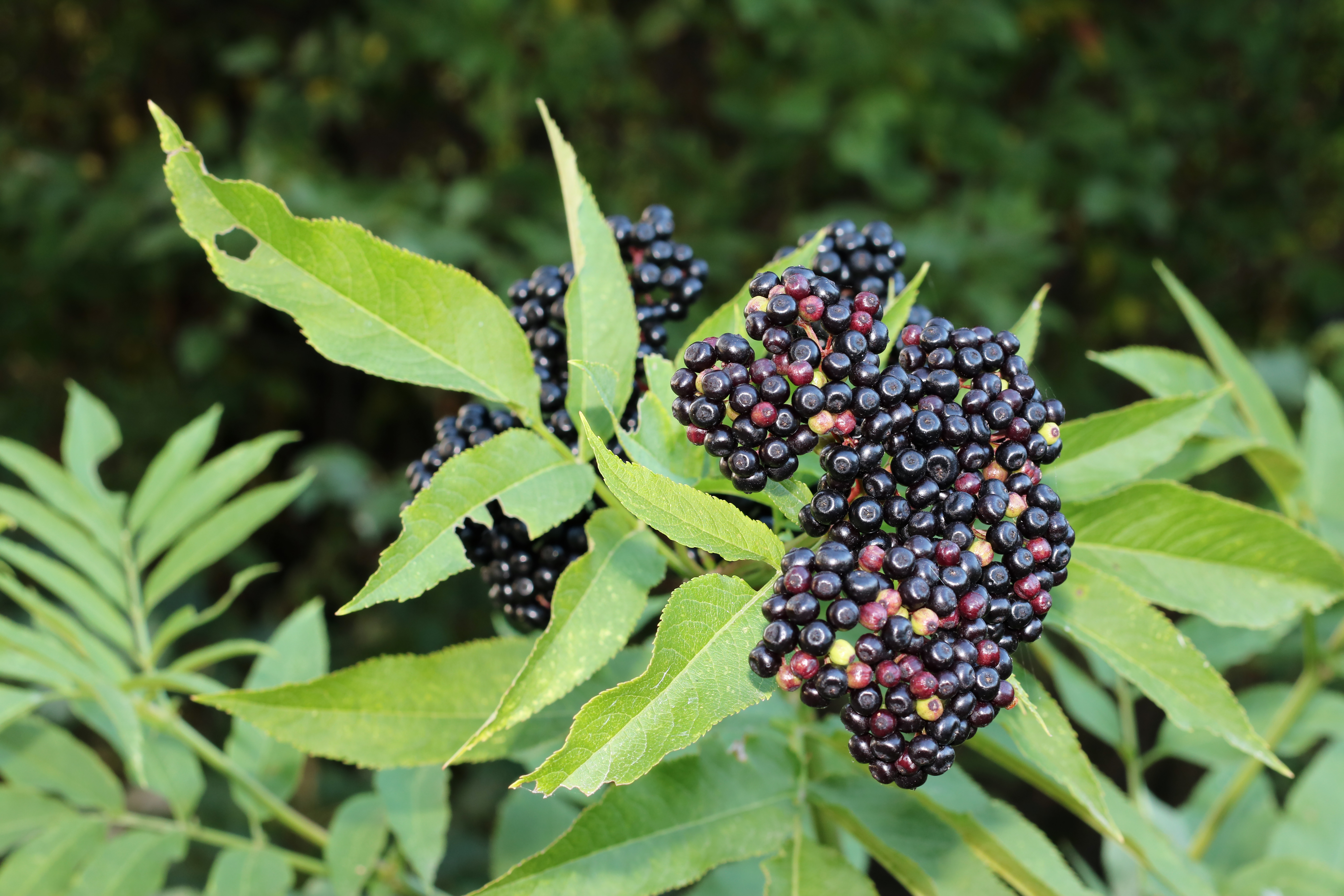
- Danewort berries

Conservation status
- Least Concern (IUCN 3.1) (Europe regional assessment)

Scientific classification
- Kingdom: Plantae
- Clade: Tracheophytes
- Clade: Angiosperms
- Clade: Eudicots
- Clade: Asterids
- Order: Dipsacales
- Family: Viburnaceae
- Genus: Sambucus
- Species: S. ebulus

Binomial name
- Sambucus ebulus L.

Synonyms
- Ebulum humile (Mill.) Garcke; Sambucus herbacea Gilib.; Sambucus humilis Mill.

= Sambucus ebulus =

European dwarf elder

Species of flowering plant

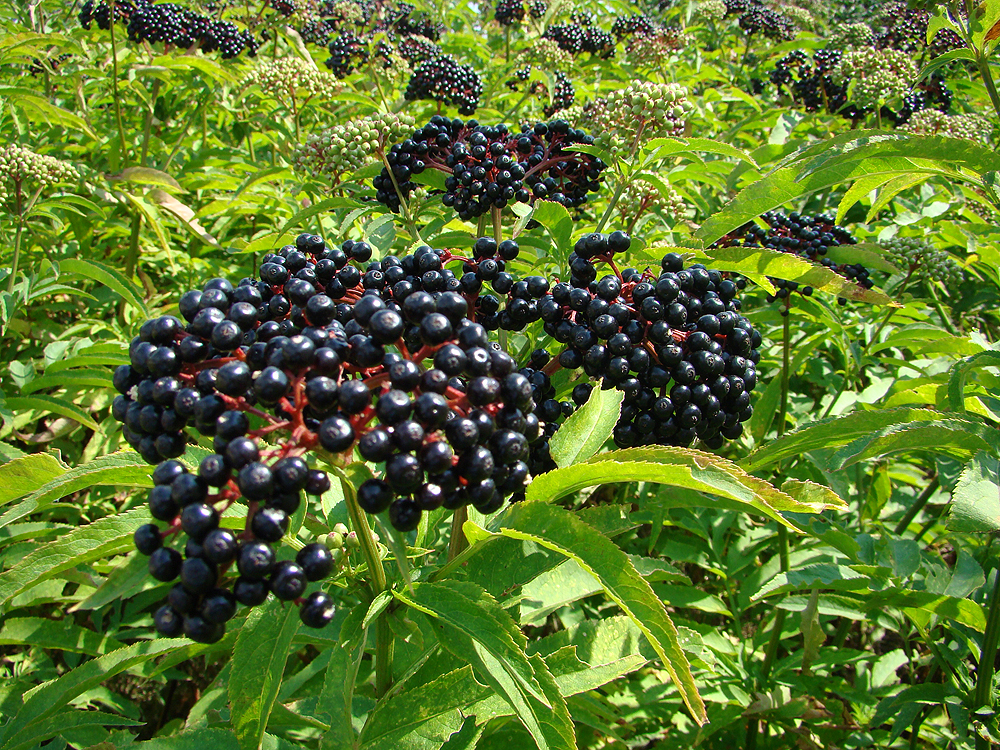
Dwarf elder berries

Sambucus ebulus, also known as danewort, dane weed, danesblood, dwarf elder or European dwarf elder, walewort, dwarf elderberry, elderwort and blood hilder, is a herbaceous species of elder, native to southern and central Europe and southwest Asia. The species is a well-established archaeophyte in much of the UK, and is also reportedly naturalized in parts of North America (New York, New Jersey and Québec).

== Description ==
Sambucus ebulus grows to a height of 1–2 m and has erect, usually unbranched stems growing in large groups from an extensive perennial underground stem rhizome. The leaves are opposite, pinnate, 15–30 cm long, with 5-9 leaflets with a foetid smell. The stems terminate in a corymb 10–15 cm diameter with numerous white (occasionally pink) flat-topped hermaphrodite flowers. The fruit is a small glossy black berry 5–6 mm diameter. The ripe fruit give out a purple juice.

The name danewort comes from the belief that it only grows on the sites of battles that involved the Danes. The term 'walewort' or 'walwort' meant 'foreign plant.' The plant's stems and leaves turn red in autumn and this may explain the link with blood. The word Dane may link to an old term for diarrhoea.

== Toxicity ==
All parts of the plant are toxic, especially the seeds. Much like the fruits of other elder species, this toxicity can be neutralized via cooking.

== Uses ==
Dwarf elder (Sambucus ebulus L) is one of the best known medicinal herbs since ancient times. In view of its benefits as a widely applicable phytomedicine, it is still used in folk medicine of different parts of the world. In addition to its nutritional values, dwarf elder contains different phytochemicals among which flavonoids and lectins are responsible for most of its therapeutic effects. Dwarf elder has been used for different ailments including: joint pains, cold, wounds, and infections."
