= Hillwort =

Hillwort may refer to:

- Wild thyme
- Mentha pulegium
