= Hoodwort =

Hoodwort is a common name for several plants and may refer to:

- Scutellaria galericulata
- Scutellaria lateriflora, native to North America
