= Cancerwort =

Cancerwort is a common name for several plants and may refer to:

- Kickxia
- Linaria vulgaris, native to Europe, Siberia, and Central Asia
