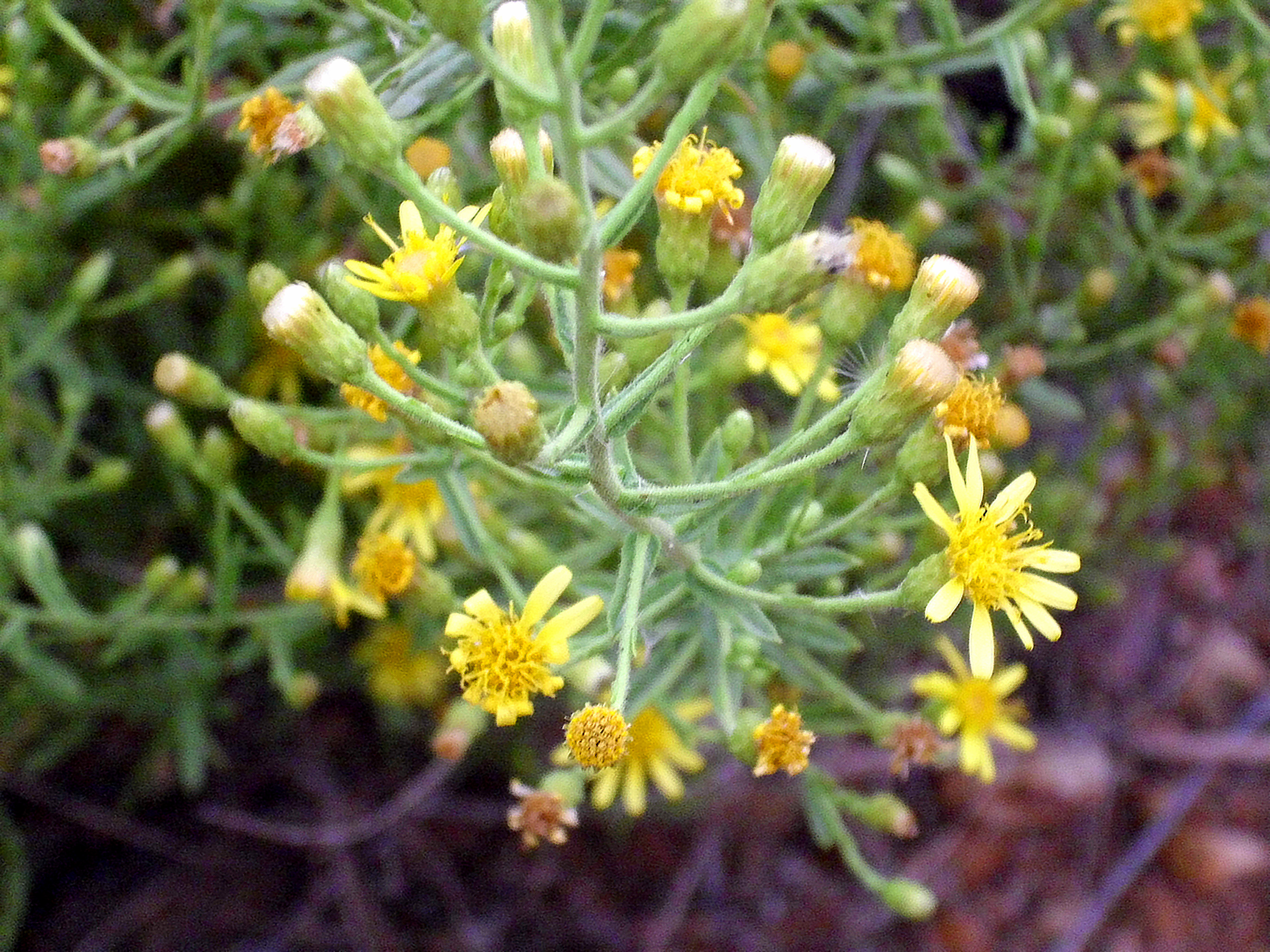
- Dittrichia viscosa

Scientific classification
- Kingdom: Plantae
- Clade: Embryophytes
- Clade: Tracheophytes
- Clade: Angiosperms
- Clade: Eudicots
- Clade: Asterids
- Order: Asterales
- Family: Asteraceae
- Subfamily: Asteroideae
- Tribe: Inuleae
- Genus: Dittrichia; Greuter, 1973

Type species
- Dittrichia viscosa (L.) Greuter

Synonyms
- Cupularia Godr. & Gren. 1850, illegitimate homonym, not Link 1833 (Myxomycota)

= Dittrichia =

Genus of flowering plants

Dittrichia is a genus of flowering plants in the daisy family. Its species were formerly included in the genus Inula.

Dittrichia is named after German botanist Manfred Dittrich (1934-2016), the previous director of the herbarium at the Botanical Garden in Berlin.

Species

- Dittrichia graveolens, stinkwort, sticky stinkweed - Mediterranean region (southern Europe + North Africa) plus southwest Asia as far east as Pakistan; naturalized in California, Asia, Africa, Australia, and other places
- Dittrichia viscosa, false yellowhead, yellow fleabane - Mediterranean region (southern Europe + North Africa)
