= Starwort =

Starwort is a common name for several plants and may refer to:

- Aster
- Spergula arvensis
- Stellaria

== See also ==
- Water starwort
