= Banewort =

Banewort is a common name for several poisonous plants and may refer to:

- Atropa belladonna, or deadly nightshade, in the nightshade family
- Ranunculus flammula, or lesser spearwort, in the buttercup family
