= Hypericum quadrangulum =

Hypericum quadrangulum can refer to two different species of St. Johnswort:

- Hypericum quadrangulatum Colmeiro = Hypericum undulatum var. undulatum
- Hypericum quadrangulatum L., nom. rej. = Hypericum tetrapterum var. tetrapterum
