= Tetter =

Characteristic of skin conditions

- Specialty: Dermatology

Tetter is an archaic term historically used to describe a variety of itchy, scaly skin diseases, rather than a single specific condition. In pre-modern medical usage, it could refer to several dermatological disorders, including conditions now classified as eczema, ringworm (tinea), or other inflammatory or infectious skin eruptions.

Many of the symptoms historically described as tetter—such as itchy, circular or scaly lesions and occasional blistering—are consistent with tinea corporis (ringworm), which presents as an itchy, ring-shaped rash with scaling borders.

However, the term was not limited to fungal diseases and could also encompass non-infectious conditions such as eczema. Conditions that can be described as tetter:

- Eczema and Duhring's disease
- Herpes
- Porphyria cutanea tarda (PCT)
- Jock itch
- Psoriasis
