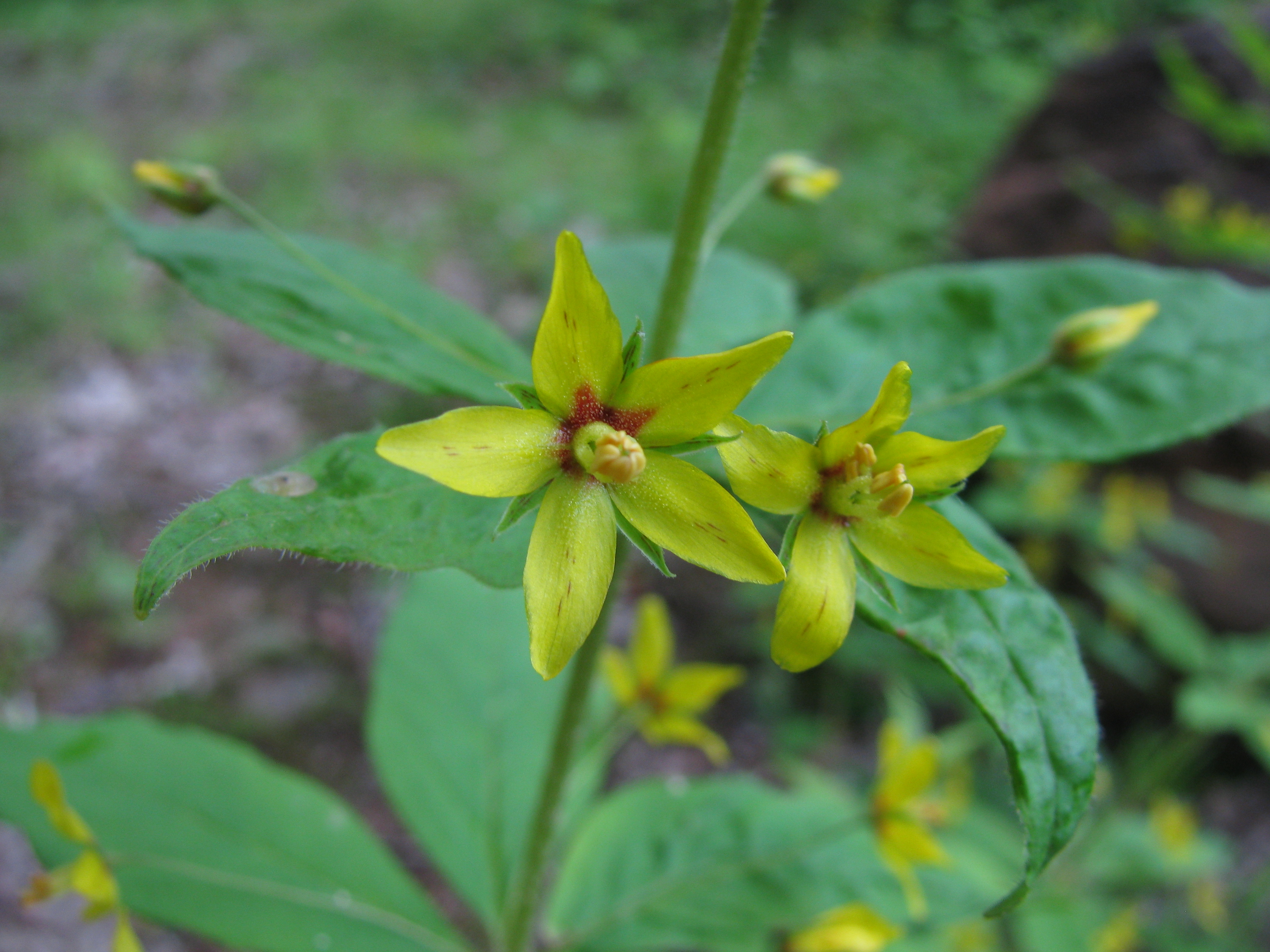

Conservation status
- Secure (NatureServe)

Scientific classification
- Kingdom: Plantae
- Clade: Tracheophytes
- Clade: Angiosperms
- Clade: Eudicots
- Clade: Asterids
- Order: Ericales
- Family: Primulaceae
- Genus: Lysimachia
- Species: L. quadrifolia

Binomial name
- Lysimachia quadrifolia L.

= Lysimachia quadrifolia =

Species of flowering plant

Lysimachia quadrifolia, the whorled loosestrife, whorled yellow loosestrife, or crosswort, is a species of herbaceous plant in the family Primulaceae. It native to the eastern United States and Canada.

== Description ==
Lysimachia quadrifolia grows to a maximum height of about 1 metre (3.3 ft). The long roots are shallow, sometimes spreading along the surface of the ground. It usually has simple, unbranched stems. The leaves are spotted and hairy on the undersides. They are borne in whorls of 3 to 7 around the stem. The flowers grow on long stalks from the leaf whorls. The five-parted flower is yellow with a reddish center and sometimes reddish margins, and streaked with dark resin canals. It is a perennial herb that grows in fens and moist prairies.

== Gallery ==
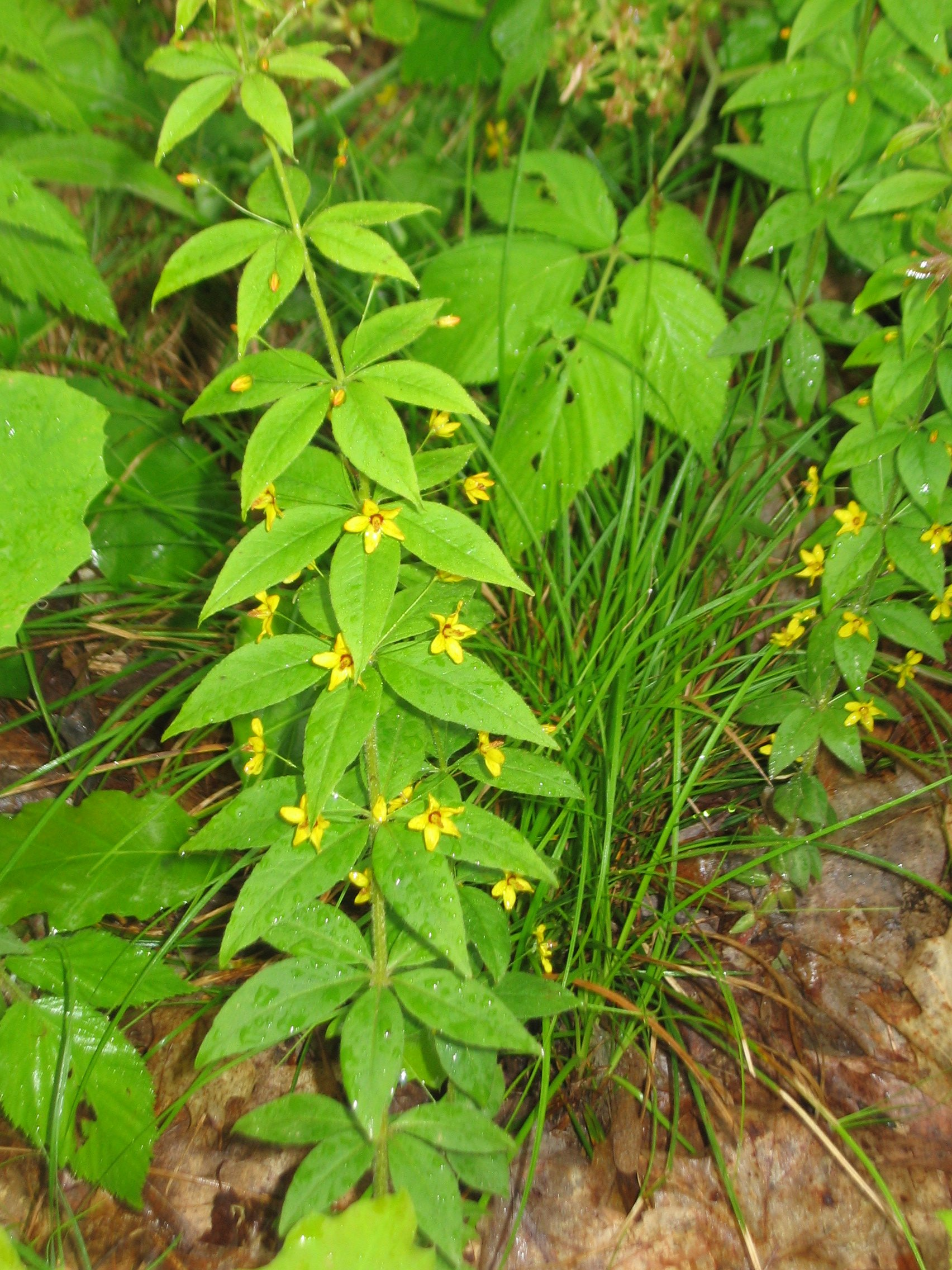
Form

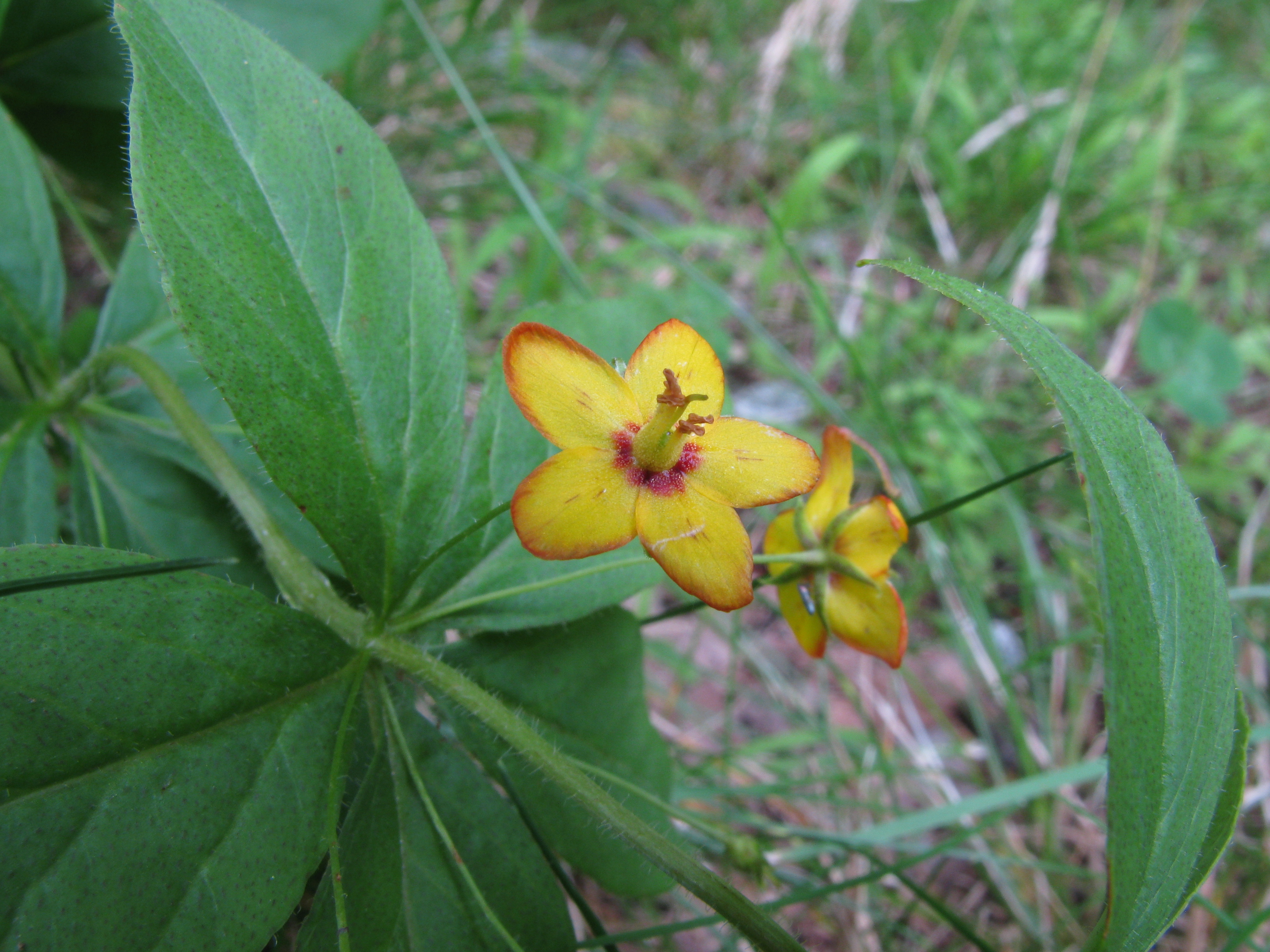
Flower

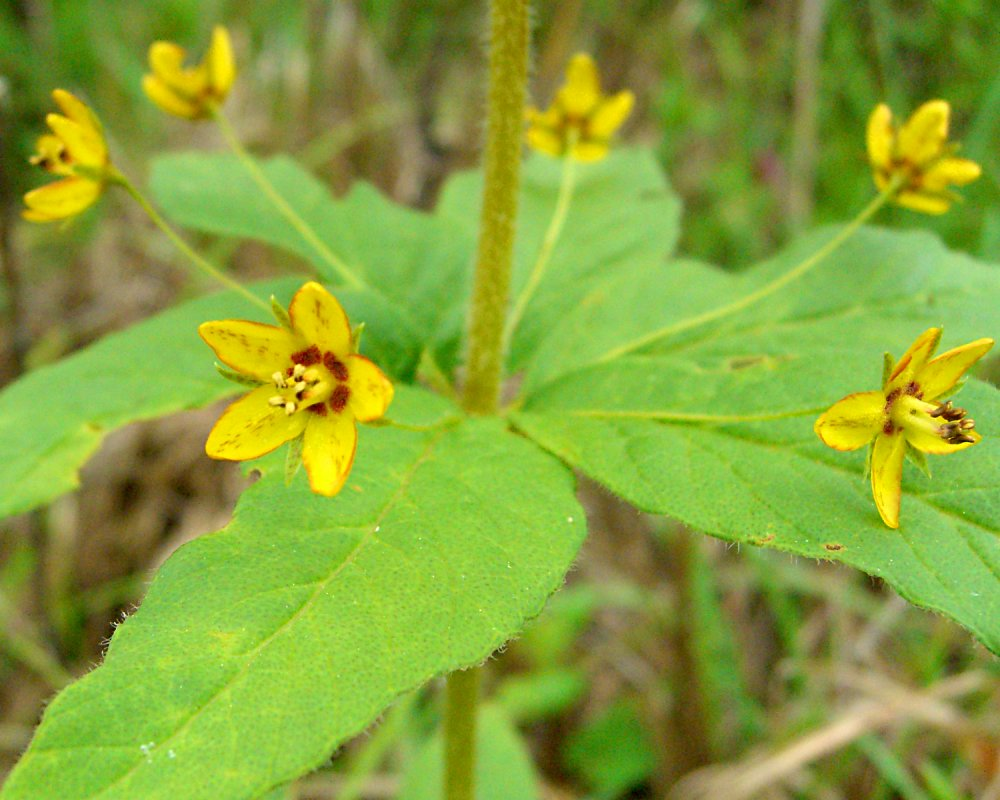
Whorl
