= Tetterwort =

Tetterwort is a common name for several plants in the family Papaveraceae and may refer to:

- Chelidonium majus, native to Europe
- Sanguinaria canadensis, native to eastern North America
