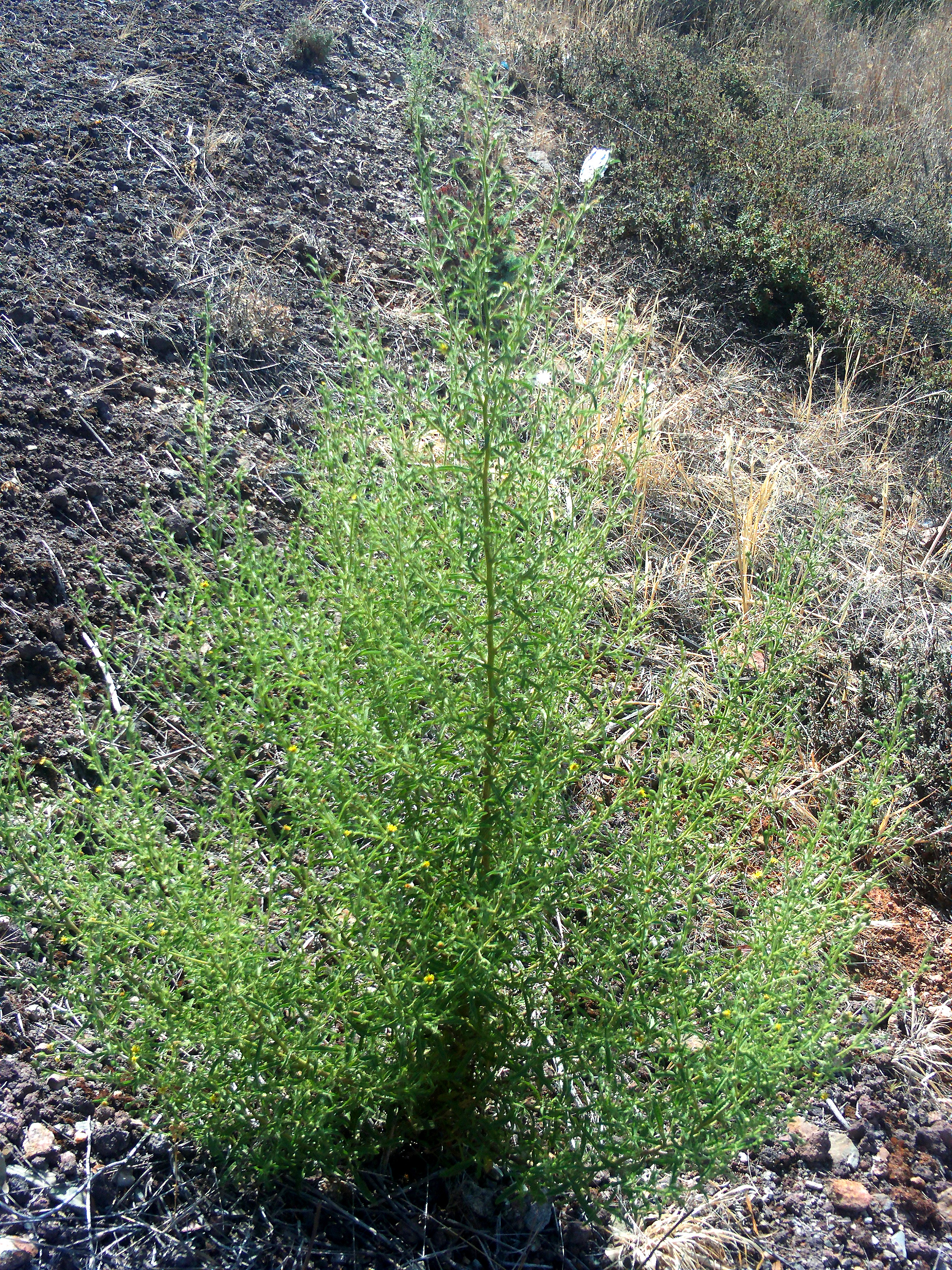
- Dittrichia graveolens at the Dehesa Boyal de Puertollano botanical gardens, Puertollano, Spain

Scientific classification
- Kingdom: Plantae
- Clade: Embryophytes
- Clade: Tracheophytes
- Clade: Angiosperms
- Clade: Eudicots
- Clade: Asterids
- Order: Asterales
- Family: Asteraceae
- Genus: Dittrichia
- Species: D. graveolens

Binomial name
- Dittrichia graveolens (L.) Greuter

Synonyms
- Synonymy: Conyza minor Bubani; Cupularia graveolens (L.) Godr. & Gren.; Erigeron graveolens L; Inula brahuica Boiss.; Inula graveolens (L.) Desf.; Inula quadridentata Lag.; Jacobaea graveolens (L.) Merino

= Dittrichia graveolens =

Species of flowering plant

Dittrichia graveolens, commonly known as stinkwort or stinking fleabane, is a plant species in the sunflower family, native to southern Europe, North Africa, and western Asia as far east as Pakistan. It has become naturalized in California, Asia, Africa, Australia, and other places and is regarded as a noxious weed in some regions. It is a classified as an invasive species in California, and a potential threat to wine production in the state.

The plant is a branching subshrub growing up to 130 centimetres (51 inches) tall, with an aromatic, camphor smell. Leaves are long and narrow, pointed at each end, with small teeth along the edges, glandular hairs on the surfaces, and a sticky resin. One plant can produce numerous yellow flower heads with as many as 16 ray florets and 40 disc florets.

Barbs on the fluffy-tipped seeds, which help it spread, can fatally damage the digestive systems of grazing animals. Oils in the plant also taint the flavor of meat and milk of animals that have consumed them. The sticky resin has been known to cause allergic reactions and severe dermatitis in humans. For this reasons, it is advisable to wear protective gloves when handling the plant.

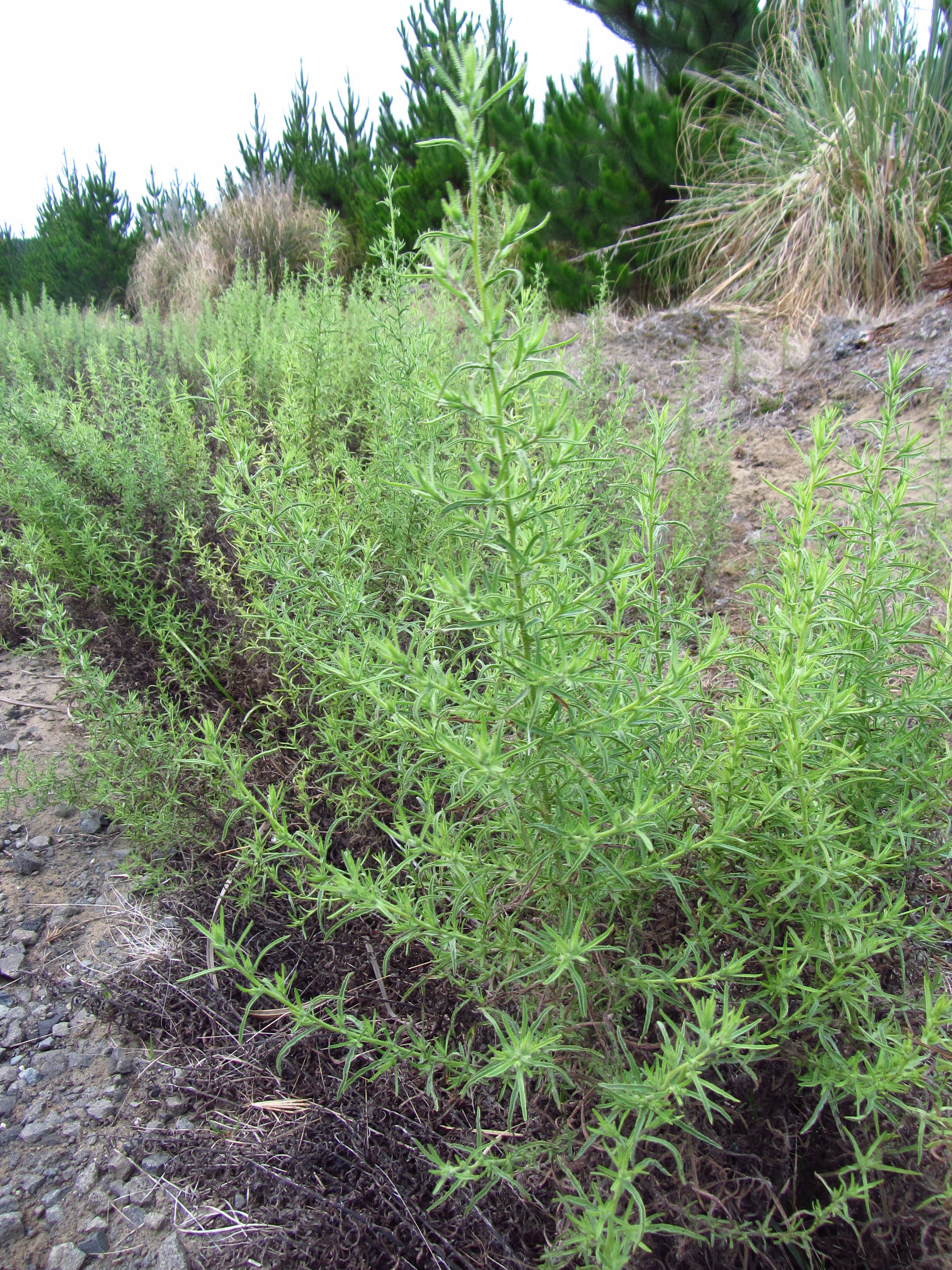
Plant in New Zealand

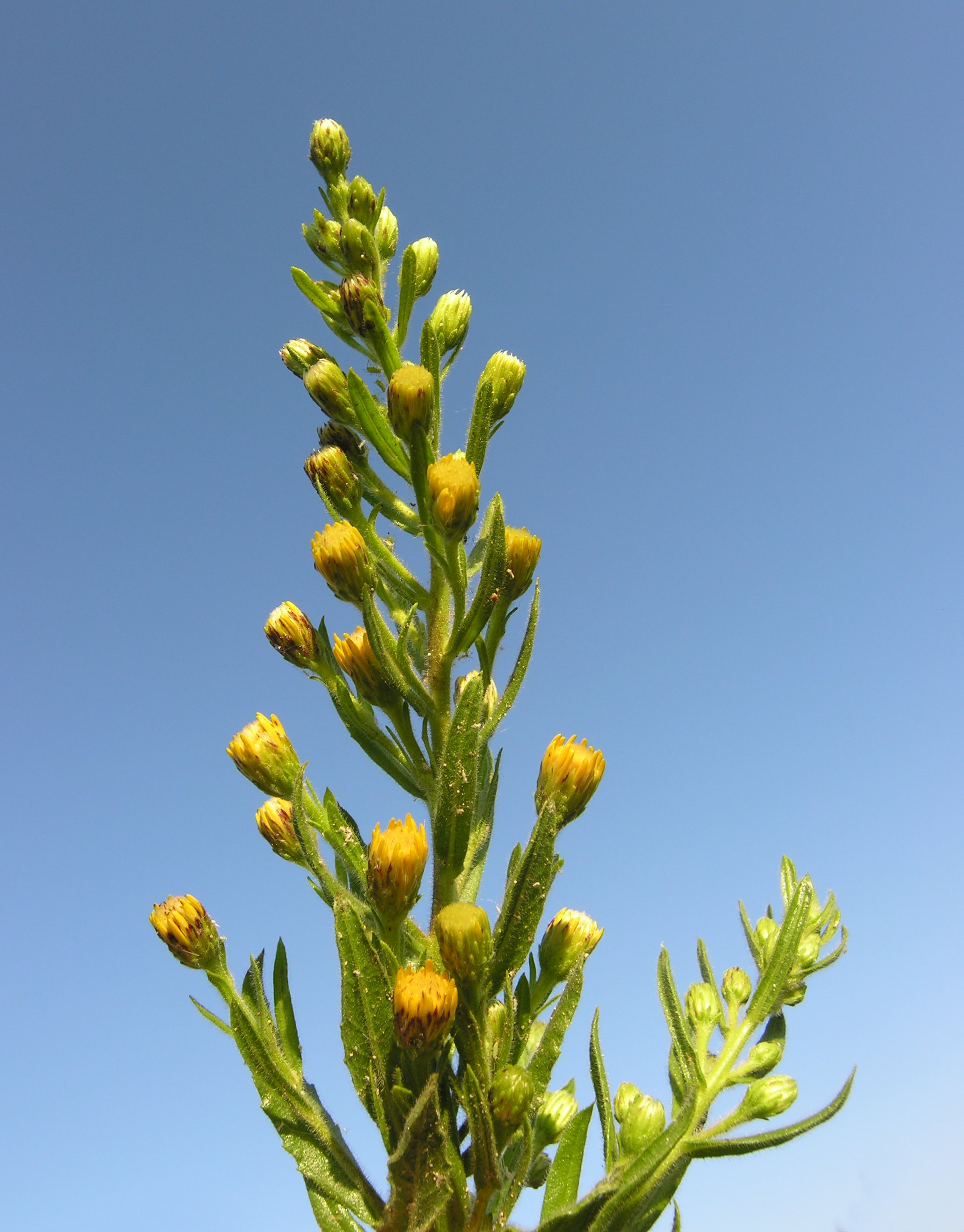
Flowers in bloom

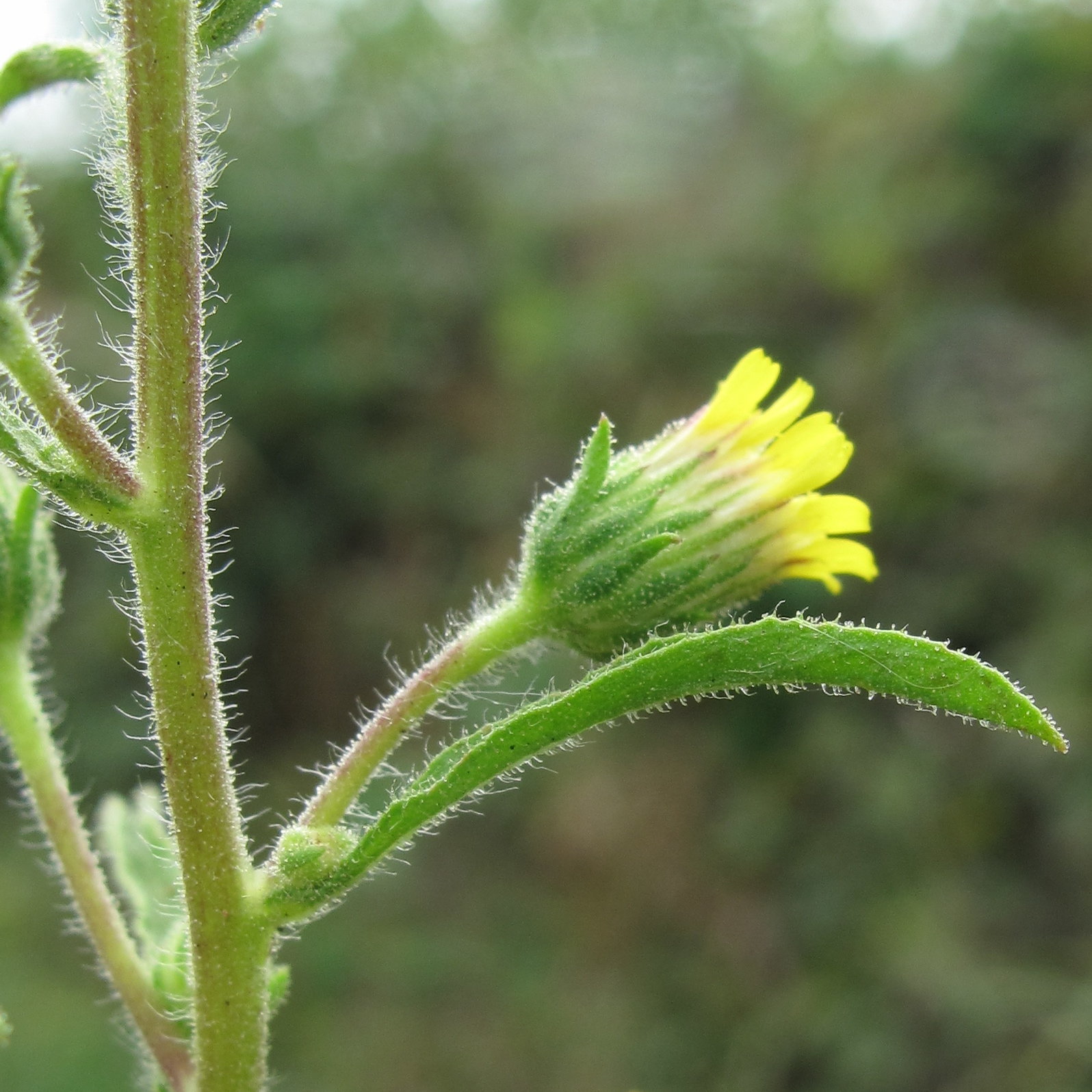
Flower (side view)

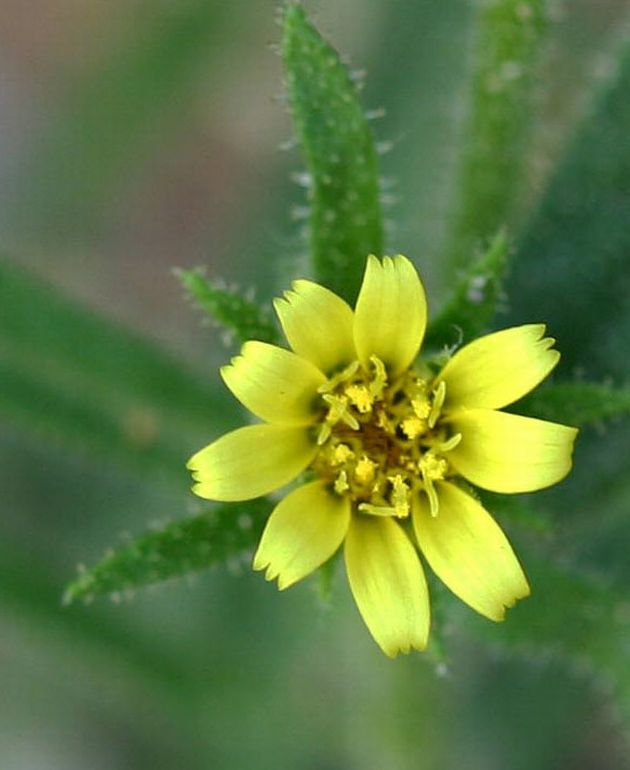
Flower (overhead)

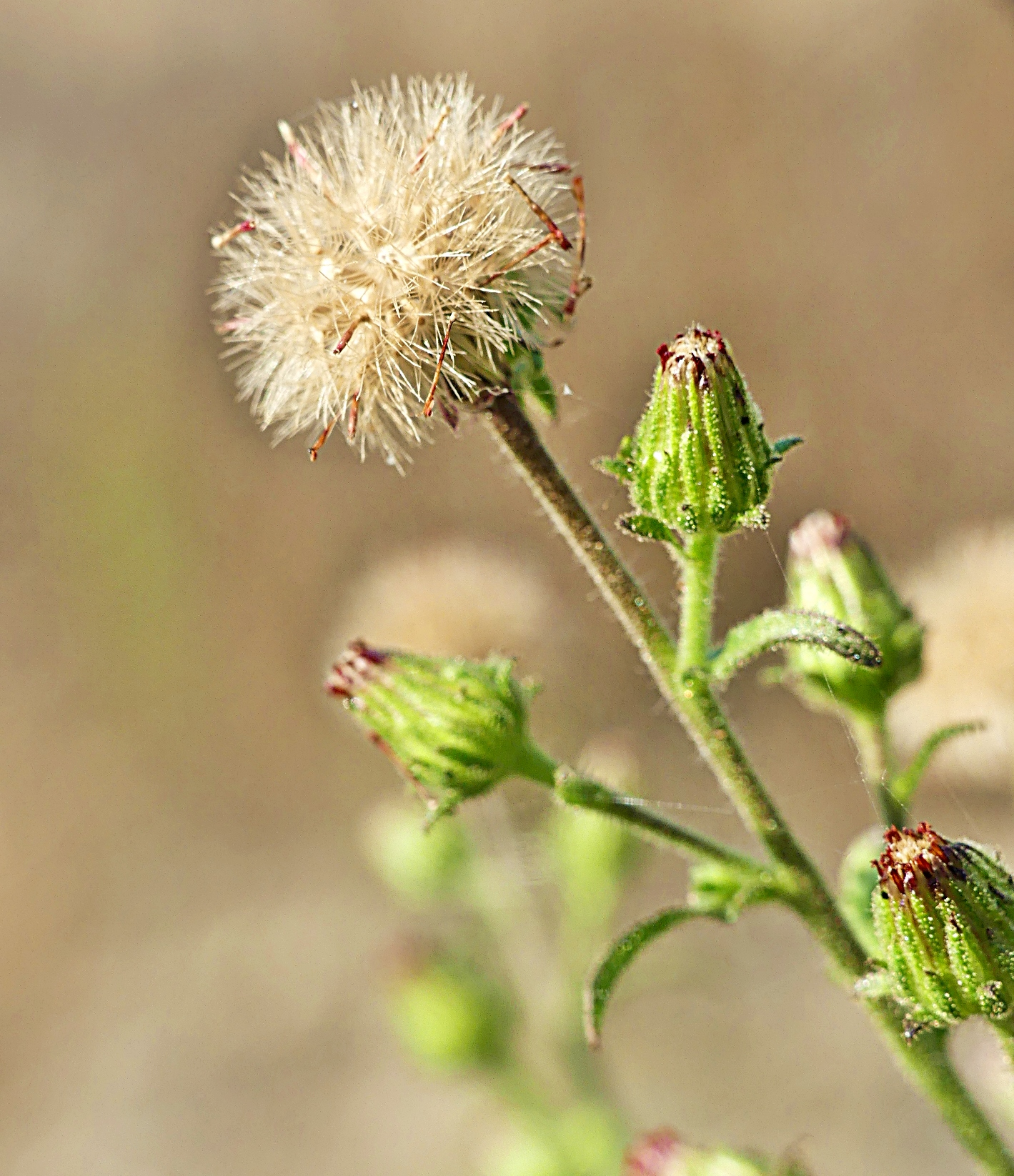
Flower gone to seed

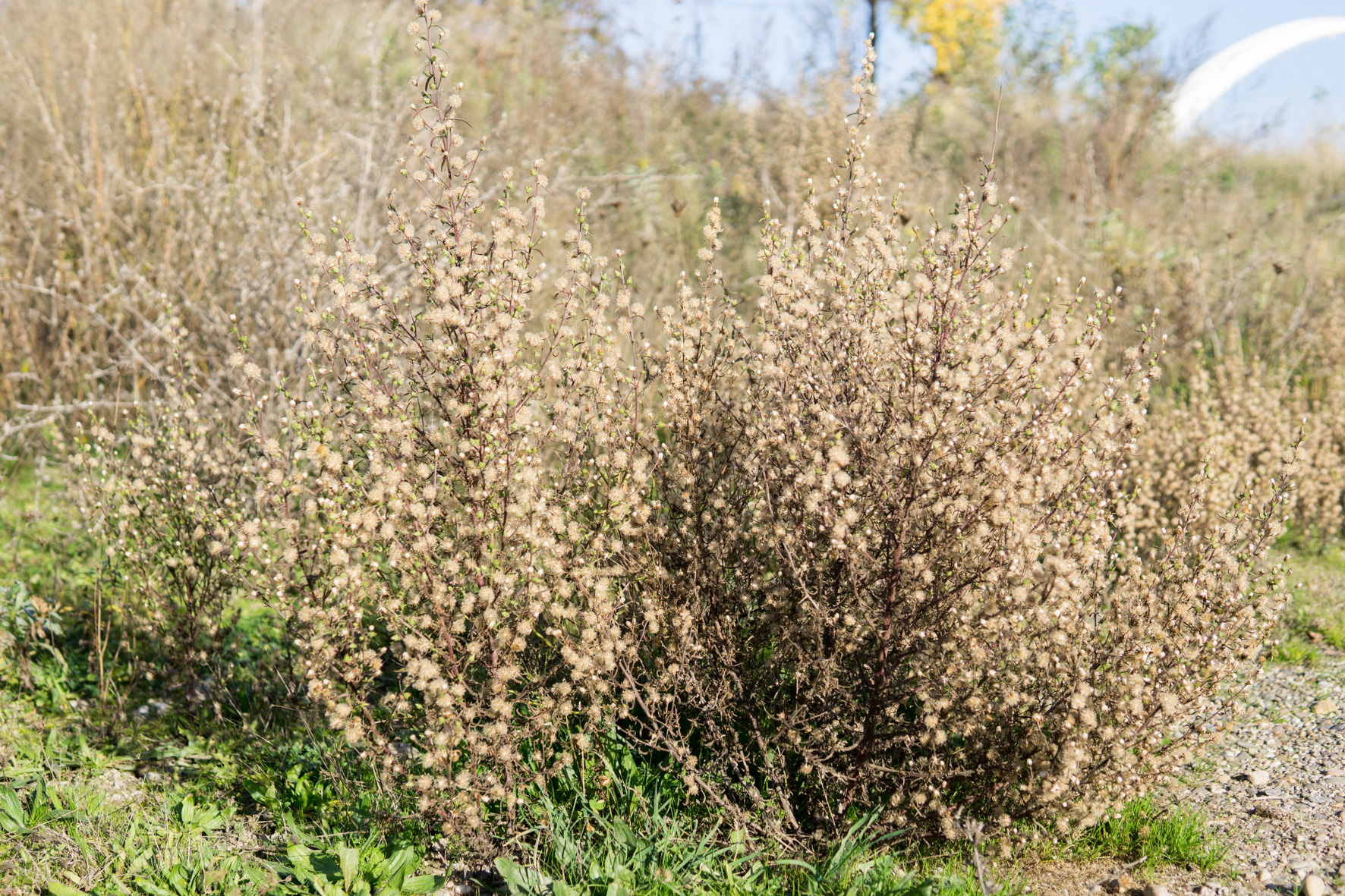
Dry form of plant
