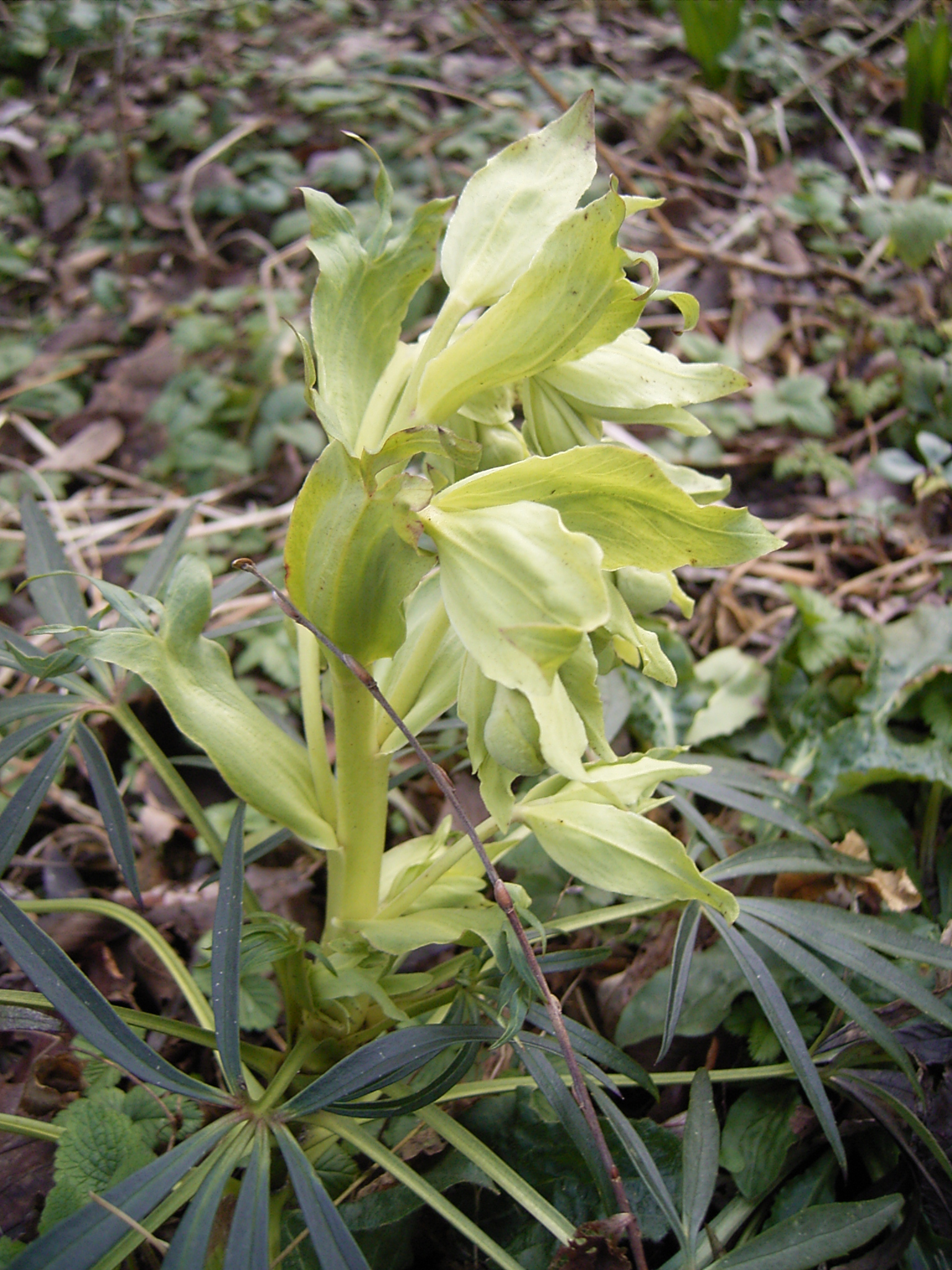

Scientific classification
- Kingdom: Plantae
- Clade: Tracheophytes
- Clade: Angiosperms
- Clade: Eudicots
- Order: Ranunculales
- Family: Ranunculaceae
- Genus: Helleborus
- Species: H. foetidus

Binomial name
- Helleborus foetidus L.

= Helleborus foetidus =

Stinking hellebore

Species of plant

Helleborus foetidus, known variously as stinking hellebore /ˈhɛlɪbɔːr/, dungwort, setterwort and bear's foot, is a species of flowering plant in the buttercup family Ranunculaceae, native to the mountainous regions of Central and Southern Europe and Asia Minor. It is found wild in many parts of England, especially on limestone soil.

== Description ==
It is an evergreen perennial growing to 80 cm (31 in) tall and 100 cm (39 in) across, with a thick succulent stem and glossy leaves. The drooping cup-shaped flowers appear in spring, and are yellowish-green, often with a purple edge to the five petal-like sepals on strongly upright stems. The flowers, typically for the family, contain numerous stamens as well as up to ten nectaries which make them attractive to bees and other insects. Each flower produces up to five (usually three) wrinkled follicles. Despite its common name, it is not noticeably malodorous, although the foliage is pungent when crushed.

All parts of the plant are poisonous, containing glycosides. Symptoms of intoxication include violent vomiting and delirium.

Yeasts colonise the nectaries of stinking hellebore and their presence has been found to raise the temperature of the flower, which may aid in attracting pollinators to the flower by increasing the evaporation of volatile organic compounds. It was the first species in which this effect was discovered.

== Horticulture ==
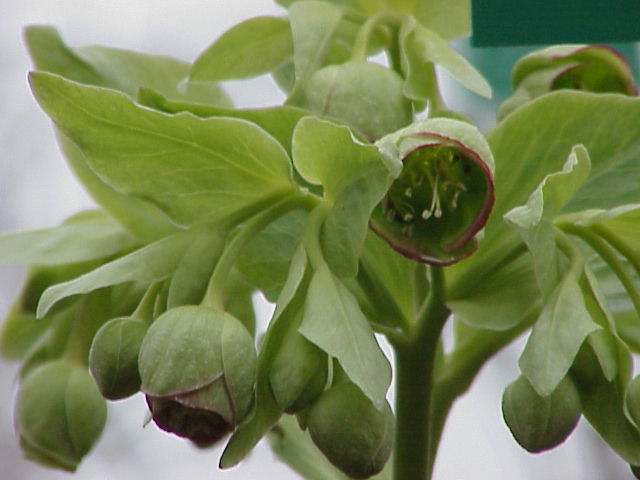
Flowers

H. foetidus is grown in gardens for its handsome evergreen foliage and large numbers of green, bell-shaped flowers borne in late winter. It prefers woodland conditions with deep, fertile, moist, humus rich, well-drained soil, and dappled shade. The species is, however, drought-tolerant. It often occurs naturally on chalk or limestone soils.

This plant has gained the Royal Horticultural Society's Award of Garden Merit.

The cultivar 'Green Giant' has very bright green flowers and finely divided foliage; 'Miss Jekyll' has fragrant flowers, intensity varying with the time of day; 'Wester Flisk Group' has red-tinted leaves and stems and gray-green flowers; the 'Sierra Nevada Group' is dwarf, reaching 30 cm.

Propagation is by division or from seed, which can be prolific, naturalising well in ideal conditions. Rodents should be kept away from the garden since they depredate the seeds either when still in fruiting plants within the carpels or from the floor after seed release.

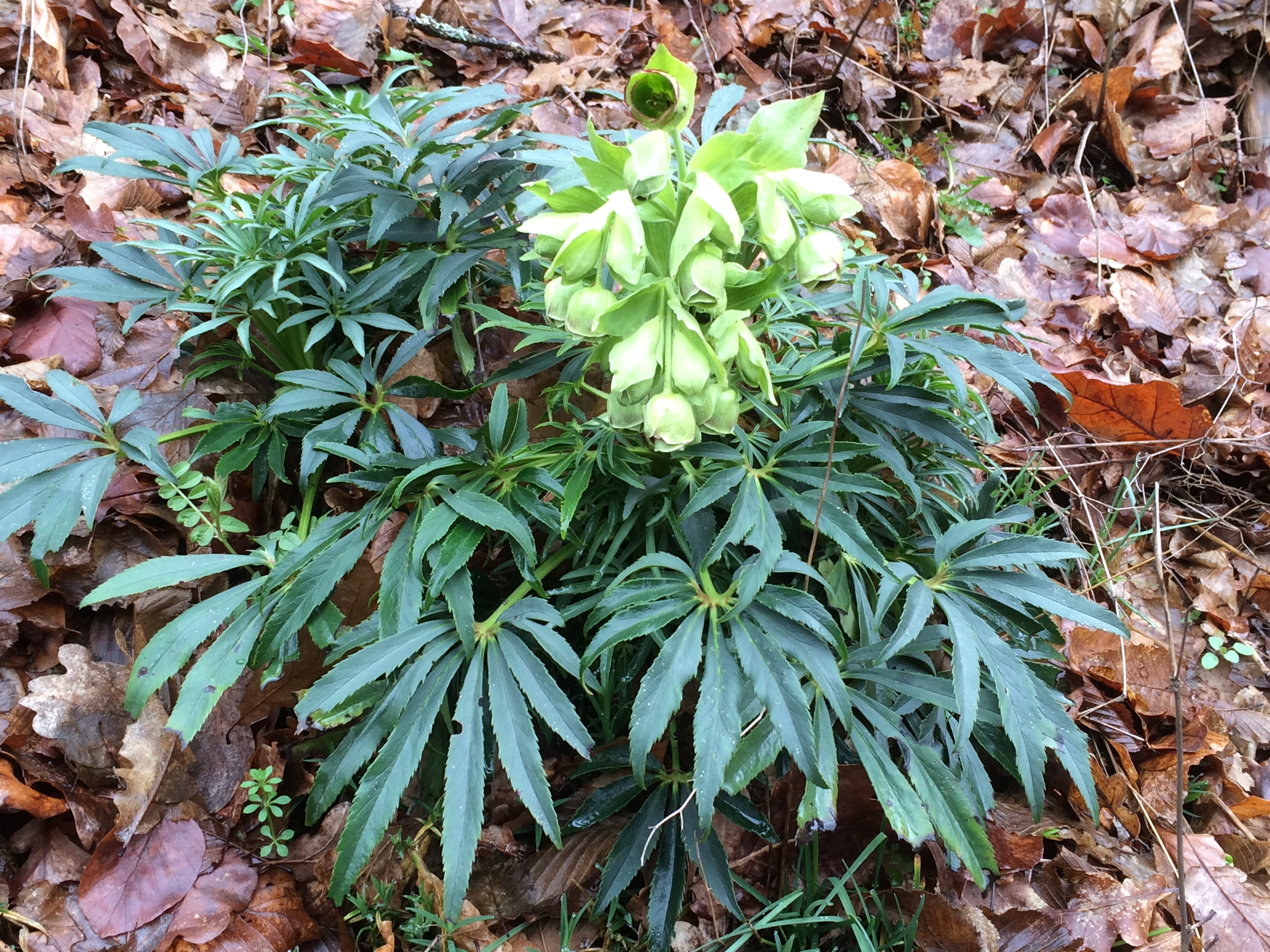
Helleborus foetidus
