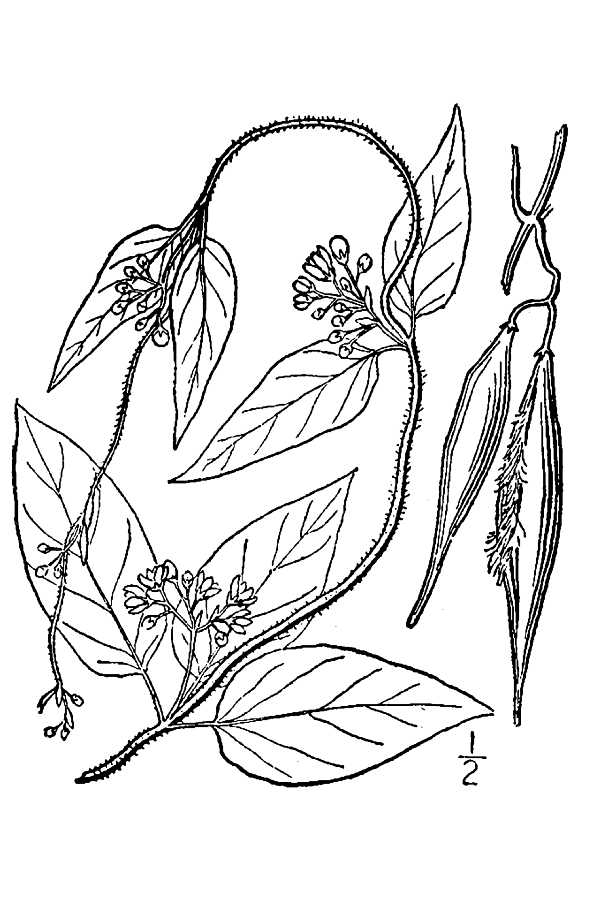

Scientific classification
- Kingdom: Plantae
- Clade: Tracheophytes
- Clade: Angiosperms
- Clade: Eudicots
- Clade: Asterids
- Order: Gentianales
- Family: Apocynaceae
- Genus: Vincetoxicum
- Species: V. nigrum

Binomial name
- Vincetoxicum nigrum (L.) Moench

Synonyms
- Cynanchum louiseae Kartesz & Gandhi; Cynanchum nigrum (L.) Pers., non Cav., nom. illeg.

= Vincetoxicum nigrum =

Species of plant

Vincetoxicum nigrum, a species in the family Apocynaceae, also known as black swallow-wort, Louise's swallow-wort, or black dog-strangling vine, is a species of plant that is native to Europe and is found primarily in Italy, France, Portugal, and Spain. It is an invasive plant species in the northeastern United States, parts of the Midwest, southeastern Canada, and California. In 2020, wild plants were found in Timaru, New Zealand.

== Description ==
Vincetoxicum nigrum is a perennial, herbaceous vine bearing ovate leaves with pointed tips. The leaves are 3–4 inches (7.6–10.2 cm) long, and 2–3 inches (5.1–7.6 cm) wide, occurring in pairs on the stem. The flowers have five petals, and are star-shaped with white hairs. The flowers range in color from dark purple to black. The fruit of Vincetoxicum nigrum is a slender, tapered follicle that ranges in color from green through light brown and is tightly packed with seeds, each bearing a fluffy pappus to allow distribution by the wind.

=== Habitat ===
Vincetoxicum nigrum tends to grow in upland areas and is tolerant to variable light, salt, and moisture levels. In the United States, the vine is often found in abandoned fields, hedgerows, brushy areas, woodlands, river banks, transportation corridors, quarries, agricultural fields, and gardens. In gardens, the plant is seen as a fast-growing weed.

=== Reproduction ===
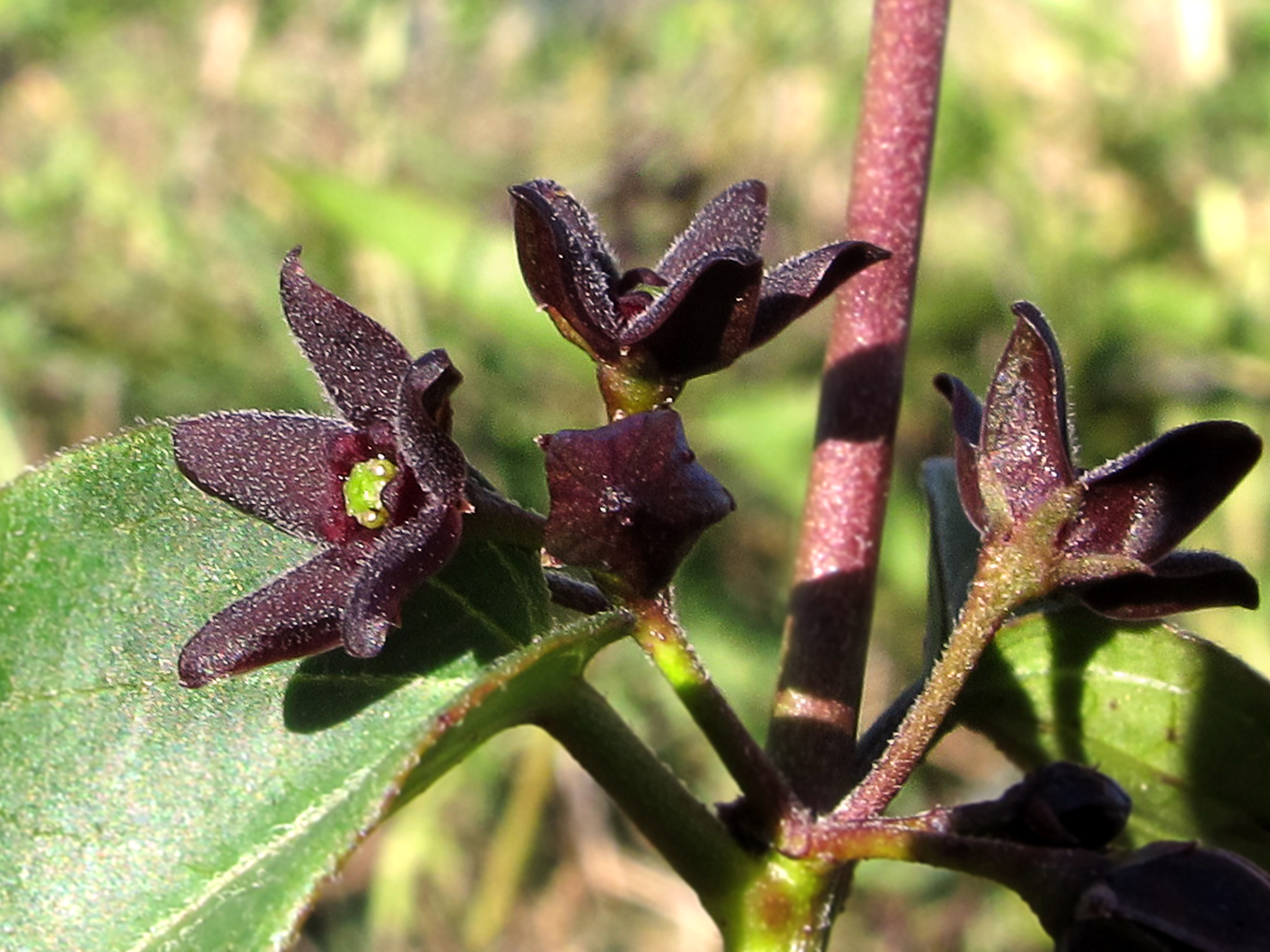
Flowers

Vincetoxicum nigrum emerges from an underground stem in the spring, and flowers during June and July. Vincetoxicum nigrum is self-pollinating, and follicles form throughout the summer. The number of follicles formed is directly linked to the amount of light the plant receives. If there is a lower level of light, then there are fewer follicles compared to a plant exposed to a higher level of light. The seeds begin to be released by mid-August, and continue to be dispersed by air currents into early October.

Each seed is polyembryonic and contains about one to four embryos per seed, increasing Vincetoxicum nigrum's proliferation. Seeds have delicate fibrous "parachutes" used in wind dispersal over long distances. In addition to seeds for reproduction, Vincetoxicum nigrum also uses rhizomes as a method of propagation, meaning that the plant clones itself underground and produces new plants. After seed dispersal, the plant dies to the ground in the winter, reappearing in the spring.

== Invasiveness ==
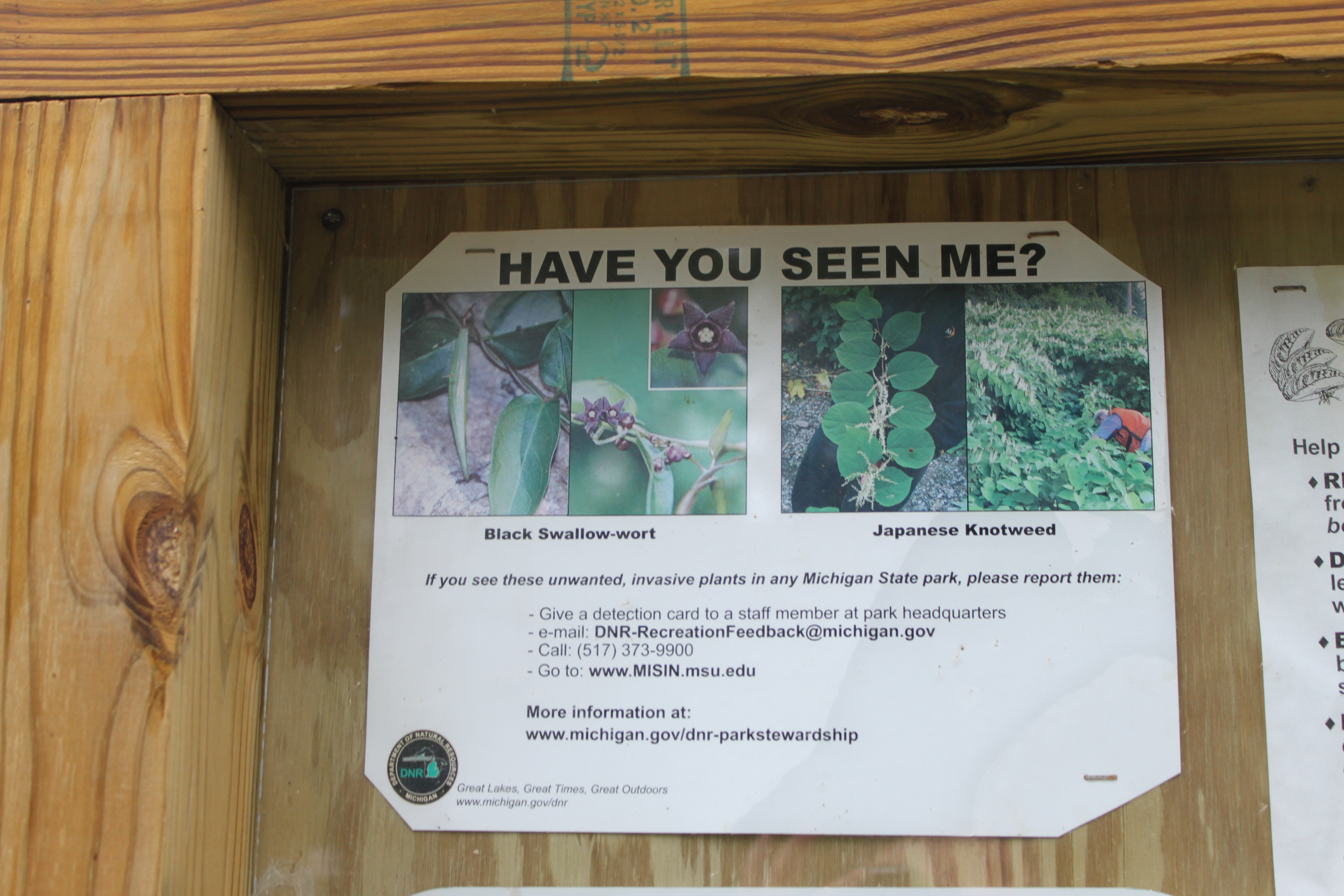
Black swallow-wort and Japanese knotweed invasive species advisory sign in Lake Allen, Cambridge Township, Michigan

The first sighting of Vincetoxicum nigrum in North America was recorded in Ipswich, Massachusetts, in 1854. In 1864, a plant collector recorded that it was "escaping from the botanical garden where it is a weed promising to be naturalized". Vincetoxicum nigrum escaped from a garden in the Cambridge area of Massachusetts and naturalized in the surrounding states and is still spreading today. Massachusetts and New York classify the plant as an invasive species. Beyond the northeastern US, the plant has been reported in Wisconsin and California.

=== Ecological implications ===
In the United States and Canada, Vincetoxicum nigrum is a threat to native species because it crowds them out. For example, it can completely replace a field of native goldenrod. Crowding out other species results in a reduced habitat for wildlife, which may become endangered because they can no longer find their optimal habitat.

Vincetoxicum nigrum threatens the rare limestone pavement barren ecosystems by crowding out plants that the native wildlife needs to survive. It may also decrease bird presence in grasslands, which may in turn cause certain insect species populations to increase.

In Vermont, Vincetoxicum nigrum crowds out the endangered species Jesup's milk vetch (Astragalus robbinsii var. jesupii). In Rhode Island, Vincetoxicum nigrum has been reported as reducing the effectiveness of electric fences, which may allow livestock to be put into danger or lost.

In addition, Vincetoxicum nigrum crowds out a species of milkweed that monarch butterflies use as their larval food plant. Thus, the spread of this plant threatens populations of monarch butterflies. Overall, Vincetoxicum nigrum reproduces very prolifically, and can easily take over various habitats in a short time. Most of the possible implications of Vincetoxicum nigrum's changing the structure of various ecosystems have not yet been studied.

== Management ==
There are four methods of management that can possibly be used for the management of Vincetoxicum nigrum. These methods are chemical, manual, mechanical, and biological. Only the chemical, manual, mechanical methods are actually used in the United States and Canada. The biological method may be used in the future. Overall, early detection and removal is the best management strategy.

=== Chemical ===
The best chemical management of Vincetoxicum nigrum is through the use of systemic herbicides which prevent seeds from being viable. Garlon 4 (triclopyr) and RoundUp Pro (glyphosate) are the main systemic herbicides that are used to control the vine. The systemic herbicide is most effective when sprayed on the plant after flowering has begun. If the herbicide is used after follicles have formed, it is less effective because viable seeds may still form. The most effective treatment using systemic herbicides is through a cut stem application, consisting of applying the chemical to the recently cut stems of the swallow-wort vines.

=== Manual ===
Manual management is the removal of Vincetoxicum nigrum from the ground by digging up its rhizomes so that the plant cannot reproduce. The vine has an extensive rhizome system which must be completely removed to prevent new shoots from growing. Trying to remove the vine by pulling will often cause the plant to detach from its rhizome, allowing the vine to continue to grow new shoots. Seed pods must be disposed of carefully, to avoid inadvertently spreading the seeds to new areas.

=== Mechanical ===
Mechanical management is the mowing down of Vincetoxicum nigrum. This method does not stop growth, but it does stop seed crops. No seed crop means that the plant will only spread through rhizomes, thus slowing -- but not stopping -- the spread.

=== Biological ===
Biological management is the use of the vine's natural enemies to stop the spread and diminish the population of Vincetoxicum nigrum. In the United States, Vincetoxicum nigrum has no natural enemies, but in its native Europe, certain caterpillars, beetles, and diseases attack the plant. Researchers at Cornell University and the USDA have investigated the use of natural enemies as a way to control the plant. The use of natural enemies is controversial, because the implications of adding more non-native species to threatened areas is unknown. In 2014 Hypena caterpillars were released in Ontario, Canada to help control Vincetoxicum's spread.
