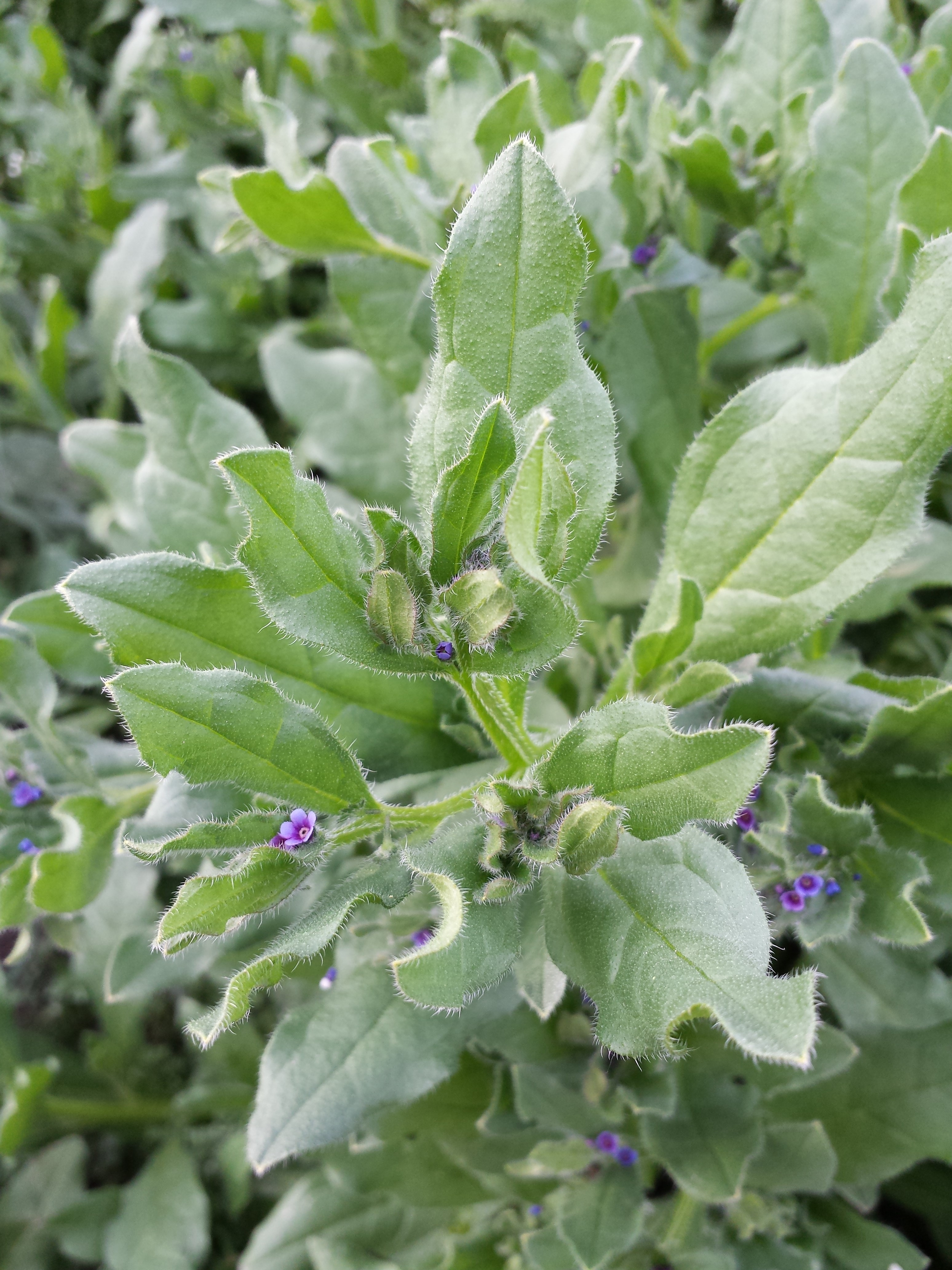

Scientific classification
- Kingdom: Plantae
- Clade: Tracheophytes
- Clade: Angiosperms
- Clade: Eudicots
- Clade: Asterids
- Order: Boraginales
- Family: Boraginaceae
- Subfamily: Boraginoideae
- Genus: Asperugo; L.
- Species: A. procumbens

Binomial name
- Asperugo procumbens L.

Synonyms
- List: Asperugo alba Mazziari; Asperugo erecta I.Pop; Asperugo vulgaris Bubani; Asperugo vulgaris Dum.Cours.

= Asperugo =

Genus and species of flowering plants

Asperugo procumbens, known as German madwort, is the single species in the monotypic plant genus Asperugo. This plant is native to Europe and temperate parts of Asia but has been introduced elsewhere by humans.

Asperugo procumbens is an annual plant with stems that grow 20 to 60 centimeters long. The stems trail along the ground, but do not root at the nodes. The leaves are most often attached alternately to the stems, but can be attached oppositely on the stems towards their ends.

== Names ==
Asperugo procumbens is known in English by the common name German madwort. It is also simply known as madwort, however many species in the genus Alyssum are also known by this name including Alyssum alyssoides.
