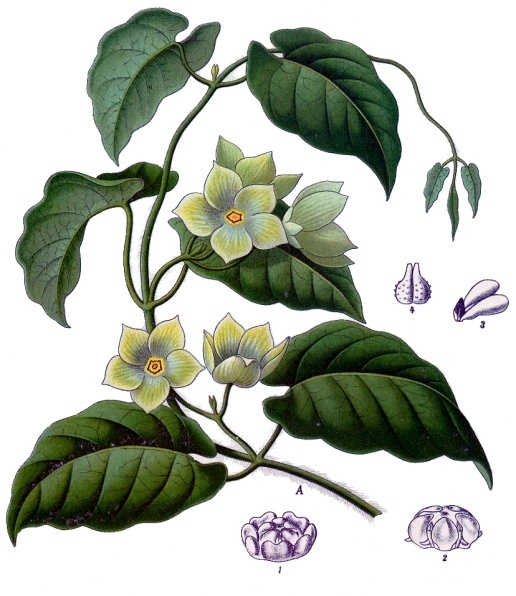
- Matelea denticulata

Scientific classification
- Kingdom: Plantae
- Clade: Tracheophytes
- Clade: Angiosperms
- Clade: Eudicots
- Clade: Asterids
- Order: Gentianales
- Family: Apocynaceae
- Subfamily: Asclepiadoideae
- Tribe: Asclepiadeae
- Genus: Matelea; Aubl.

Synonyms
- Amphorella Brandegee (1910); Callaeolepium H.Karst. (1866); Coelostelma E.Fourn. (1885); Cyclodon Small (1933); Edisonia Small (1933); Heliostemma Woodson (1935); Himantostemma A.Gray (1885); Hostea Willd. (1798), nom. superfl.; Jacaima Rendle (1936); Labidostelma Schltr. (1906); Lhotzkyella Rauschert (1982); Malinvaudia E.Fourn. (1885); Matella Bartl. (1830), orth. var.; Microdactylon Brandegee (1908); Odontostephana Alexander (1933); Omphalophthalma H.Karst. (1866); Pachystelma Brandegee (1920); Peckoltia E.Fourn. (1885); Poicilla Griseb. (1866); Poicillopsis Schltr. (1912); Prosthecidiscus Donn.Sm. (1898); Pulvinaria E.Fourn. (1885), nom. illeg.; Pycnobregma Baill. (1890); Rothrockia A.Gray (1885); Rytidoloma Turcz. (1852); Tetracustelma Baill. (1890); Trichosacme Zucc. (1845); Tympananthe Hassk. (1847); Urostephanus B.L.Rob. & Greenm. (1895)

= Matelea =

Genus of plants

Matelea is a genus of flowering plants in the family Apocynaceae. It contains about 200 species, which are commonly known as milkvines. Some people consider Chthamalia to be a synonym to or a subgenus of Matelea.

== Species ==
As of November 2023, Plants of the World Online accepted the following species:

- Matelea abbreviata Standl. & L.O.Williams
- Matelea acevedoi Morillo
- Matelea acuminata (Griseb.) Woodson
- Matelea adenocardia (Standl.) Woodson
- Matelea alabamensis (Vail) Woodson
- Matelea alainii Woodson
- Matelea altamirana Morillo
- Matelea ampiyacuensis Morillo
- Matelea andina (Malme) Morillo
- Matelea angustifolia (Griseb.) Greuter & Liede
- Matelea angustiloba (B.L.Rob. & Greenm.) W.D.Stevens
- Matelea annulata Alain
- Matelea araneosa (Donn.Sm.) Woodson
- Matelea asplundii (Malme) Morillo
- Matelea atrocoronata (Brandegee) Woodson
- Matelea atrolingua Morillo, I.L.Morais & Farinaccio
- Matelea atrostellata Rintz
- Matelea attenuata (Rusby) Morillo
- Matelea bahiensis Morillo & Fontella
- Matelea baldwyniana (Sweet) Woodson
- Matelea barrosiana Fontella
- Matelea belizensis (Lundell & Standl.) Woodson
- Matelea bicolor (Britton & P.Wilson) Woodson
- Matelea bolivarensis Morillo
- Matelea boliviana Morillo
- Matelea brevicoronata (B.L.Rob.) Woodson
- Matelea brevistipitata Krings & Morillo
- Matelea calcicola (Greenm.) Woodson
- Matelea callejasii Morillo
- Matelea camiloana Morillo
- Matelea campechiana (Standl.) Woodson
- Matelea camporum (Brandegee) Woodson
- Matelea capillacea (E.Fourn.) Fontella & E.A.Schwarz
- Matelea cardozoi Morillo
- Matelea carmenaemiliae Morillo
- Matelea carnevaliana Morillo
- Matelea carolinensis (Jacq.) Woodson
- Matelea castanea (Brandegee) Woodson
- Matelea cayennensis Morillo
- Matelea cervantesii Lozada-Pérez & L.O.Alvarado
- Matelea chihuahuensis (A.Gray) Woodson
- Matelea chimboracensis Morillo
- Matelea chrysantha (Greenm.) Woodson
- Matelea congesta (Decne.) Woodson
- Matelea constanzana J.Jiménez Alm.
- Matelea coriacea Morillo
- Matelea cornejoi Morillo
- Matelea corniculata W.D.Stevens & Arbeláez
- Matelea correllii Spellman
- Matelea corrugata W.D.Stevens
- Matelea corynephora Krings
- Matelea costaricensis W.D.Stevens
- Matelea costata (Urb.) Morillo
- Matelea crassifolia Woodson
- Matelea cremersii Morillo
- Matelea crenata (Vail) Woodson
- Matelea crispiflora (Urb.) J.Jiménez Alm.
- Matelea cuatrecasasii Morillo
- Matelea cynanchoides (Engelm. & A.Gray) Woodson
- Matelea decipiens (Alexander) Woodson
- Matelea delascioi Morillo
- Matelea dictyopetala (Urb. & Ekman) Krings
- Matelea diversifolia (E.Fourn.) Morillo & Fontella
- Matelea domingensis (Alain) Krings
- Matelea dusenii Morillo
- Matelea dwyeri Morillo
- Matelea ecuadorensis (Schltr.) Morillo
- Matelea edwardsensis Correll
- Matelea ekmanii (Urb.) Woodson
- Matelea elachyantha W.D.Stevens
- Matelea emmartinezii W.D.Stevens
- Matelea falcata Juárez-Jaimes, G.M.Hern.-Barón & W.D.Stevens
- Matelea fendleri Morillo
- Matelea ferruginea W.D.Stevens
- Matelea filipes W.D.Stevens & Monterrosa
- Matelea flavidula (Chapm.) Woodson
- Matelea floridana (Vail) Woodson
- Matelea fontellana Morillo
- Matelea forerana Morillo
- Matelea fournieri Morillo
- Matelea fruticosa (Brandegee) Woodson
- Matelea funkiana Morillo
- Matelea furvescens W.D.Stevens
- Matelea geminiflora (Decne.) Fontella
- Matelea gentlei (Lundell & Standl.) Woodson
- Matelea gilbertoana Krings
- Matelea glandulosa (Poepp. ex Decne.) Morillo
- Matelea gonoloboides (B.L.Rob. & Greenm.) Woodson
- Matelea graciliflora Krings & Morillo
- Matelea gracilis (Decne.) W.D.Stevens
- Matelea greenmanii Shinners
- Matelea greggii (Vail) Woodson
- Matelea grenandii Morillo
- Matelea grisebachiana (Schltr.) Alain
- Matelea guatemalensis (K.Schum.) Woodson
- Matelea haberi W.D.Stevens
- Matelea haitiensis (P.T.Li) Krings
- Matelea harlingii Morillo
- Matelea hastata Alain
- Matelea hastulata (A.Gray) Sundell
- Matelea hatschbachii (Fontella & C.Valente) Morillo
- Matelea herbacea Woodson
- Matelea hildegardiana Morillo
- Matelea hirtelliflora McDonnell & Fishbein
- Matelea holstii Morillo & Carnevali
- Matelea honorana Morillo
- Matelea inconspicua (Brandegee) Woodson
- Matelea inops Woodson
- Matelea insolita W.D.Stevens
- Matelea ionantha Woodson
- Matelea jansen-jacobsiae Morillo
- Matelea jaramilloi Morillo
- Matelea jenmanii (Morillo) Morillo
- Matelea johnstonii Shinners
- Matelea kirkbridei Morillo
- Matelea klugii Morillo
- Matelea lanata (Zucc.) Woodson
- Matelea lanceolata (Decne.) Woodson
- Matelea lehmannii (Schltr.) Morillo
- Matelea lesueurii (Standl.) Woodson
- Matelea leucodermis (Rusby) Morillo
- Matelea lhotzkyana (E.Fourn.) Fontella
- Matelea liesneri Morillo
- Matelea ligustrina (Decne.) Morillo
- Matelea linearipetala Alain
- Matelea magallanesii E.J.Lott
- Matelea marcoassisii Fontella
- Matelea matezkii Morillo
- Matelea matogrossensis Fontella
- Matelea medusae Woodson
- Matelea meyeri Woodson
- Matelea micrantha L.O.Williams
- Matelea microphylla Morillo
- Matelea molinarum L.O.Williams
- Matelea monticola Alain
- Matelea mutisiana Morillo
- Matelea neblinae Morillo
- Matelea neei Morillo
- Matelea nielsenii Morillo
- Matelea nigrescens (Schltdl.) Woodson
- Matelea nipensis (Urb.) Woodson
- Matelea oaxacana (Standl.) W.D.Stevens
- Matelea obliqua (Jacq.) Woodson
- Matelea ocellata W.D.Stevens
- Matelea ochracea Morillo
- Matelea oldemanii Morillo
- Matelea orthoneura Morillo
- Matelea orthosioides (E.Fourn.) Fontella
- Matelea pakaraimensis Krings
- Matelea palustris Aubl.
- Matelea panamensis Spellman & Dwyer
- Matelea parvifolia (Torr.) Woodson
- Matelea pastazana Morillo
- Matelea patalensis (Donn.Sm.) Woodson
- Matelea pauciflora (Spreng.) Woodson
- Matelea pedalis (E.Fourn.) Fontella & E.A.Schwarz
- Matelea pedicellata (Malme) Morillo
- Matelea pentactina Krings
- Matelea petiolaris (A.Gray) Woodson
- Matelea phainops Krings
- Matelea picturata (Hemsl.) Woodson
- Matelea pilosa (Benth.) Woodson
- Matelea pinguifolia (Standl.) Woodson
- Matelea porphyrantha (Standl.) Woodson
- Matelea porphyrocephala Morillo
- Matelea pringlei (A.Gray) Woodson
- Matelea proctorii Krings
- Matelea prosthecidiscus Woodson
- Matelea pseudobarbata (Pittier) Woodson
- Matelea pubescens (Griseb.) Krings
- Matelea pueblensis (Brandegee) Woodson
- Matelea punensis Morillo
- Matelea purpureolineata Woodson
- Matelea purpusii (Brandegee) Woodson
- Matelea pusilliflora L.O.Williams
- Matelea pyrrhotricha (Decne.) Fontella
- Matelea quercetorum (Standl.) W.D.Stevens
- Matelea quindecimlobata Farinaccio & W.D.Stevens
- Matelea radiata Correll
- Matelea refracta (E.Fourn.) Morillo
- Matelea reitzii Fontella
- Matelea reticulata (Engelm. ex A.Gray) Woodson
- Matelea rhamnifolia (Griseb.) Krings
- Matelea rhynchocephala Krings
- Matelea rivularis Woodson
- Matelea rogersii Woodson
- Matelea romeroi Morillo
- Matelea sagittifolia (A.Gray) Woodson ex Shinners
- Matelea sanojana Krings & Morillo
- Matelea sastrei Morillo
- Matelea schultesii Morillo & Carnevali
- Matelea schunkei Morillo
- Matelea serpens Woodson
- Matelea sintenisii (Schltr.) Woodson
- Matelea sprucei Morillo
- Matelea squiresii (Rusby) Morillo
- Matelea stenopetala Sandwith
- Matelea stenosepala Lundell
- Matelea stergiosii Morillo
- Matelea suareziae Morillo
- Matelea suberifera (B.L.Rob.) W.D.Stevens
- Matelea subsessilifolia Morillo
- Matelea sucrensis Morillo
- Matelea sugillata W.D.Stevens
- Matelea sylvicola L.O.Williams
- Matelea tamnifolia (Griseb.) Woodson
- Matelea tarrazuana J.E.Jiménez & Hidalgo-Mora
- Matelea tenuis Woodson
- Matelea texensis Correll
- Matelea tezcatlipocantha E.B.Cortez, Lozada-Pérez & L.O.Alvarado
- Matelea tigrina (Griseb.) Woodson
- Matelea tinctoria Woodson
- Matelea tlilxochitli E.B.Cortez, Lozada-Pérez & L.O.Alvarado
- Matelea torulosa Krings
- Matelea trichopedicellata Krings & Morillo
- Matelea tristiflora (Standl.) Woodson
- Matelea tuerckheimii (Donn.Sm.) Woodson
- Matelea umbellata (Brandegee) Woodson
- Matelea urophylla L.O.Williams
- Matelea vailiana Woodson
- Matelea vargasii Morillo
- Matelea variifolia (Schltr.) Woodson
- Matelea vaupesana Morillo
- Matelea velutina (Schltdl.) Woodson
- Matelea velutinoides W.D.Stevens
- Matelea violacea Woodson
- Matelea virginiae Morillo
- Matelea weberbaueri Morillo
- Matelea woodsonii Shinners
- Matelea wootonii (Vail) Woodson
- Matelea woytkowskii Morillo

=== Formerly placed here ===
- Matelea alicieae Morillo = Peruviasclepias aliciae (Morillo) Morillo
- Matelea amazonica Morillo = Riparoampelos amazonicus (Morillo) Morillo
- Matelea arizonica (A.Gray) Shinners = Gonolobus arizonicus
- Matelea borinquensis Alain = Matelea variifolia
- Matelea cyclophylla (Standl.) Woodson = Suberogerens cyclophylla (Standl.) Morillo
- Matelea fimbriatiflora Morillo = Gonolobus fimbriatiflorus
- Matelea fulvida (F.Ballard) W.D.Stevens and Matelea grandiflora Standl. = Rotundanthus fulvidus (F.Ballard) Morillo
- Matelea gonocarpos (Walter) Shinners = Gonolobus suberosus
- Matelea gracieae Morillo = Graciemoriana gracieae (Morillo) Morillo
- Matelea yanomamica Morillo = Orinoquia yanomamica (Morillo) Morillo
