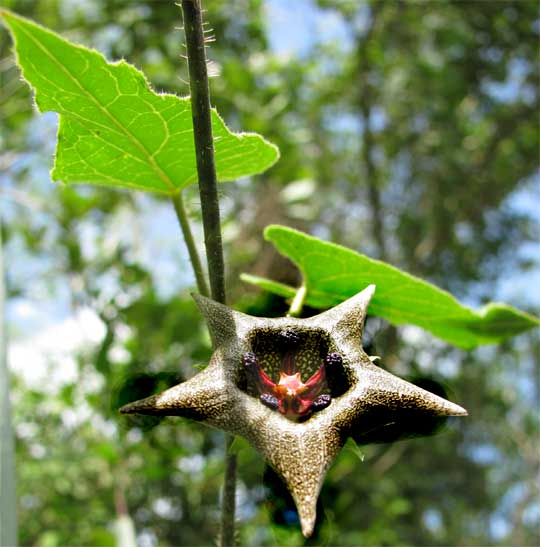
- Dictyanthus yucatanensis

Scientific classification
- Kingdom: Plantae
- Clade: Tracheophytes
- Clade: Angiosperms
- Clade: Eudicots
- Clade: Asterids
- Order: Gentianales
- Family: Apocynaceae
- Tribe: Asclepiadeae
- Genus: Dictyanthus; Decne.

Type species
- Dictyanthus pavonii Decne.

Synonyms
- Matelea subgen. Dictyanthus (Decne.) Woodson

= Dictyanthus =

Genus of flowering plants

Dictyanthus is a genus of plant in family Apocynaceae, first described as a genus in 1844. It is native to Mexico and Central America.

Species

1. Dictyanthus aeneus Woodson - Yucatán, Campeche
2. Dictyanthus altatensis (Brandegee) W.D.Stevens - Sonora, Sinaloa
3. Dictyanthus asper (Mill.) W.D.Stevens - Veracruz, Colima, Oaxaca, Chiapas, Guatemala, El Salvador, Honduras, Nicaragua
4. Dictyanthus ceratopetalus Donn.Sm. - Guatemala, El Salvador, Honduras, Nicaragua
5. Dictyanthus eximius (W.D.Stevens) W.D.Stevens - Chiapas
6. Dictyanthus hamatus (W.D.Stevens) W.D.Stevens - Oaxaca, Guerrero
7. Dictyanthus lautus (W.D.Stevens) W.D.Stevens - Colima
8. Dictyanthus macvaughianus (W.D.Stevens) W.D.Stevens - Michoacán, Jalisco
9. Dictyanthus parviflorus Hemsl. - Michoacán, Morelos, Oaxaca, Chiapas, Veracruz
10. Dictyanthus pavonii Decne. - Guanajuato, Colima, Guerrero, Oaxaca, Jalisco, Morelos, México State, Michoacán, Nayarit, Sinaloa
11. Dictyanthus prostratus Brandegee - Veracruz
12. Dictyanthus sepicola (W.D.Stevens) W.D.Stevens - Jalisco, Nayarit, Sinaloa
13. Dictyanthus stapeliiflorus Rchb. - Mexico
14. Dictyanthus suffruticosus (W.D.Stevens) W.D.Stevens - Oaxaca
15. Dictyanthus tigrinus Conz. & Standl. - Oaxaca, Veracruz, Chiapas
16. Dictyanthus tuberosus C.B.Rob. - Jalisco, Durango, Nayarit, Sinaloa, Sonora
17. Dictyanthus yucatanensis Standl. - Yucatán, Campeche, Quintana Roo

formerly included

moved to Matelea

- Dictyanthus reticulatus (Engelm. ex A.Gray) Benth. & Hook.f. ex Hemsl., synonym of Matelea reticulata (Engelm. ex A.Gray) Woodson
