= Matelea orthoneura =

Conservation status
- Critically Endangered (IUCN 3.1)

Scientific classification
- Kingdom: Plantae
- Clade: Tracheophytes
- Clade: Angiosperms
- Clade: Eudicots
- Clade: Asterids
- Order: Gentianales
- Family: Apocynaceae
- Genus: Matelea
- Species: M. orthoneura

Binomial name
- Matelea orthoneura Morillo

Species of plant

Matelea orthoneura is a species of plant in the family Apocynaceae. It is endemic to Ecuador. Its natural habitat is subtropical or tropical moist lowland forests. It is threatened by habitat loss.
