= Cyperus ovatus =

Scientific classification
- Kingdom: Plantae
- Clade: Tracheophytes
- Clade: Angiosperms
- Clade: Monocots
- Clade: Commelinids
- Order: Poales
- Family: Cyperaceae
- Genus: Cyperus
- Species: C. ovatus

Binomial name
- Cyperus ovatus Baldwin, 1825

Species of sedge

Cyperus ovatus, also known as ovateleaf flatsedge, is a species of sedge that is native to south eastern parts of North America and some islands of Caribbean.

== See also ==
- List of Cyperus species
