= Orinoquia =

The term Orinoquia may refer to:

- one of two largely overlapping geographic areas:
  - the Orinoquía natural region of Colombia
  - the watershed of the Orinoco River, in Venezuela and Colombia
- Orinoquia (plant), a genus of flowering plants in family Apocynaceae, the dogbane family
