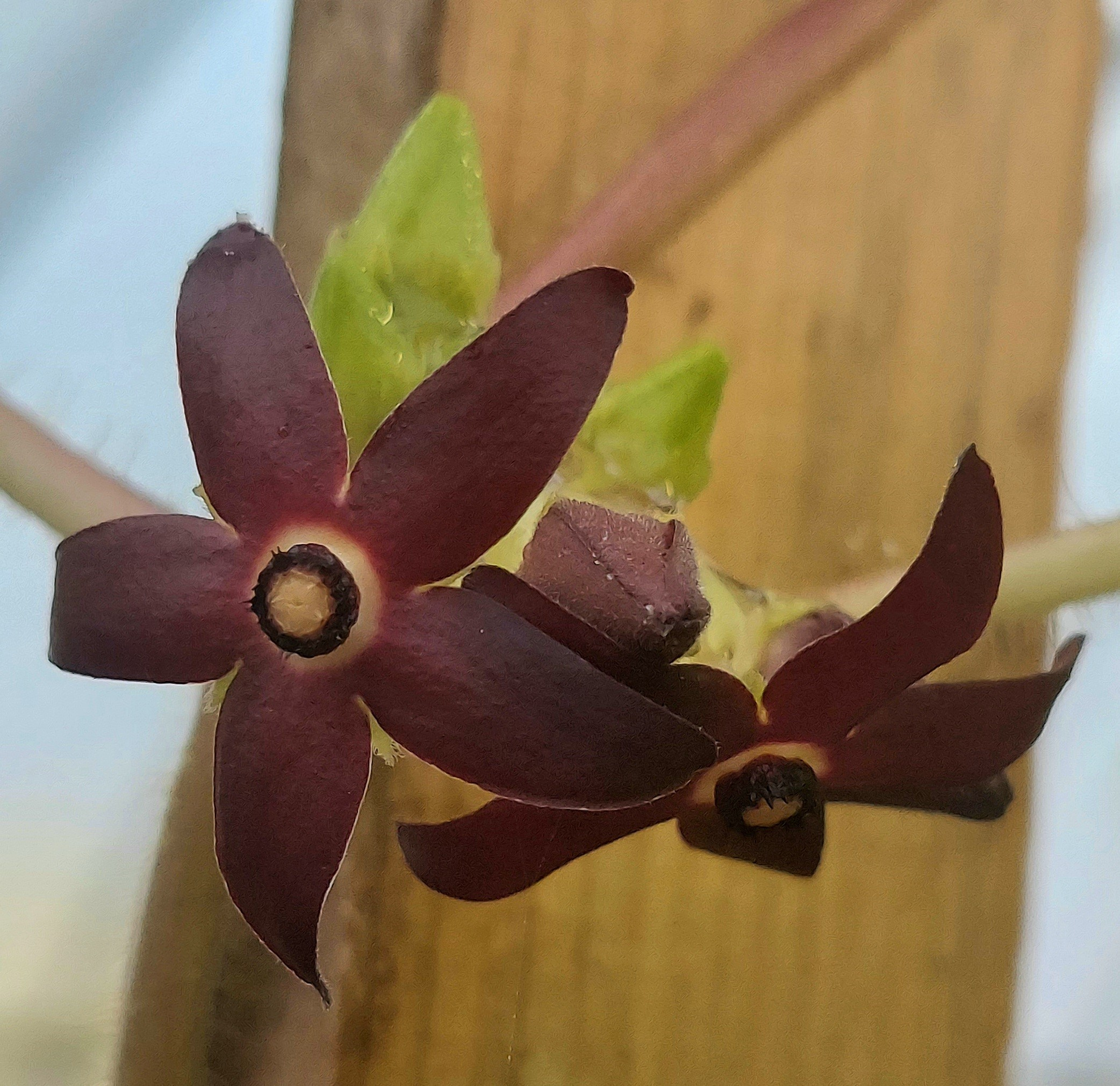
- Flower of Matelea floridana

Conservation status
- Imperiled (NatureServe)

Scientific classification
- Kingdom: Plantae
- Clade: Tracheophytes
- Clade: Angiosperms
- Clade: Eudicots
- Clade: Asterids
- Order: Gentianales
- Family: Apocynaceae
- Genus: Matelea
- Species: M. floridana

Binomial name
- Matelea floridana (Vail) Woodson

= Matelea floridana =

Species of flowering plant

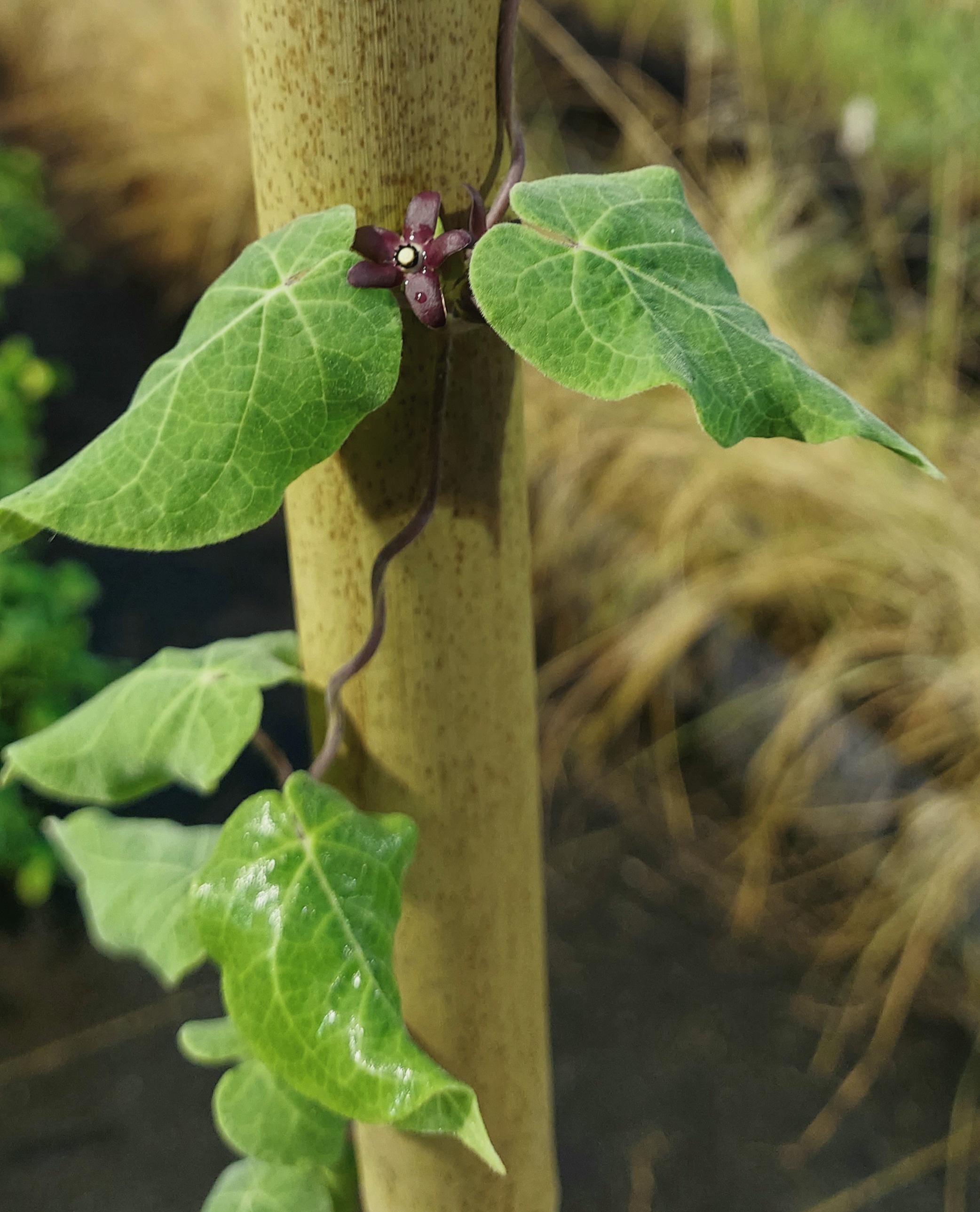
Matelea floridana, grown by Pat Mahon, shows the blooms occurring at most all new nodes along stem.

Matelea floridana (also called Florida milkvine or Florida spiny pod) is a flowering plant within the Milkweed Subfamily (Family Apocynaceae; Subfamily Asclepiadoideae). It is endemic to Florida and two counties in Georgia, and is listed as Endangered. It is a perennial dicot. Flowers are purplish black, 1–2 cm (0.4–0.8 in) in diameter, borne on short pedicels that occur at mature nodes along the stem, from one to many flowers. Leaf pairs are opposite, cordate from 5–10 (2–4 in) cm in length, lightly pubescent.

This species is very similar in appearance to Matelea carolinensis, but the distribution of the two species do not overlap.

== Cultivation ==
This species germinates around 30–60 days without stratification of any kind. It is slow to grow, but after around 60 days, the plant can then be trained to climb. This species is thigmotropic, so it is imperative to allow it to climb. Once plant has established upon a vertical face, flowers may begin to form at nearly every node. Flowers smell like rotting fruit.
