= Atrostemma =

Scientific classification
- Kingdom: Plantae
- Clade: Tracheophytes
- Clade: Angiosperms
- Clade: Eudicots
- Clade: Asterids
- Order: Gentianales
- Family: Apocynaceae
- Genus: Atrostemma; Morillo (2015)

Species
- 10; see text

Genus of plants

Atrostemma is a genus of flowering plants in the dogbane family (Apocynaceae). It includes ten species which are native to Central America (Guatemala, Nicaragua, and Costa Rica), northern South America (northern Peru, Colombia, Venezuela, and Guyana), and eastern Brazil.

== Species ==
10 species are currently accepted:

- Atrostemma acutissimum (Rusby) Morillo – Colombia
- Atrostemma costanense (Morillo) Morillo – Venezuela
- Atrostemma glaberrimum (Woodson) Morillo – Guatemala (Petén)
- Atrostemma hadrostemmum (W.D.Stevens) Morillo – Nicaragua and Costa Rica
- Atrostemma hammelii (W.D.Stevens) Morillo – Costa Rica
- Atrostemma manarae (Morillo) Morillo – Venezuela
- Atrostemma melinii (Malme) Morillo – northern Peru
- Atrostemma planiflorum (Jacq.) Morillo – Colombia, Venezuela, and Guyana
- Atrostemma riparium (Morillo) Morillo – Guyana and Brazil (Bahia and Espírito Santo)
- Atrostemma xerophilum Morillo – Colombia and Venezuela
