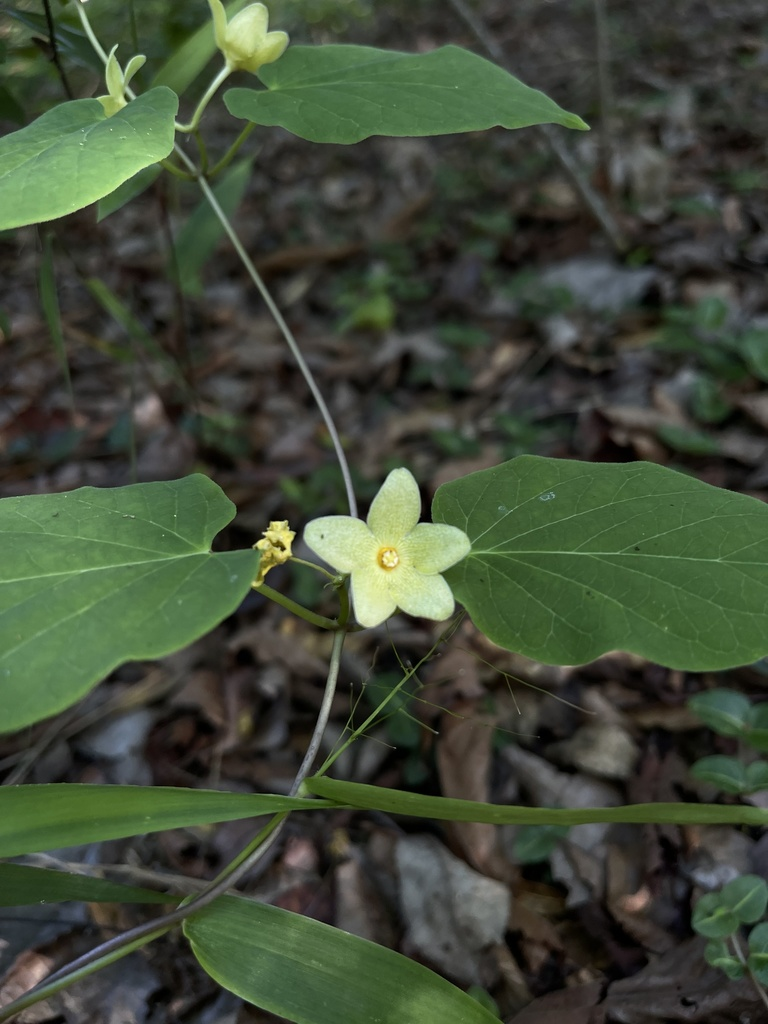
- Matelea alabamensis in flower

Conservation status
- Imperiled (NatureServe)

Scientific classification
- Kingdom: Plantae
- Clade: Tracheophytes
- Clade: Angiosperms
- Clade: Eudicots
- Clade: Asterids
- Order: Gentianales
- Family: Apocynaceae
- Genus: Matelea
- Species: M. alabamensis

Binomial name
- Matelea alabamensis (Vail) Woodson

Synonyms
- Vincetoxicum alabamense Vail

= Matelea alabamensis =

Species of flowering plant

Matelea alabamensis is a species of flowering plant in the dogbane family known by the common names Alabama milkvine, Alabama anglepod, and Alabama spiny-pod. It is native to the southeastern United States, where it occurs in Alabama, Georgia, and Florida.

This rhizomatous perennial herb produces one to three stems which creep across the ground or twine around adjacent vegetation, reaching several meters in length. They are green or maroon-tinged, filled with a milky sap, and dotted with reddish glands on the newer parts. The oppositely arranged leaves are borne on petioles a few centimeters long which are covered in scattered hairs. The yellow-green leaf blades are up to 10 to 15 centimeters long. The inflorescence is an umbel of rotate flowers each about 2.5 centimeters across. The corolla has five yellow-green lobes with a green netting pattern. Flowering occurs in March through June. Flowering is more likely on vines that climb up, rather than spread along the ground. The fruit is a yellow-green, spiky follicle up to 10 centimeters long. The seeds have a tuft of long, white hairs at one end that help them disperse on the wind.

This plant grows in ravines in forests, generally in the area between the dry upper slopes and the moist lower slopes. The plant grows in areas where there are many other plants to climb but that also receive sunlight. The species is tolerant of shade but are more robust and produce more fruit in sunnier areas. The plant relies on regimes of natural disturbance to keep the forest open enough for it to thrive; in some areas the disturbance comes in the form of storms. The canopy is dominated by Magnolia grandiflora and Fagus grandifolia and sometimes oaks and hickories. Associated species include Quercus hemisphaerica, Q. virginiana, Q. nigra, Q. alba, Carya cordiformis, C. glabra, C. pallida, Prunus serotina, Tilia americana, Liquidambar styraciflua, Pinus echinata, P. taeda, and P. glabra, Cornus florida, Hamamelis virginiana, Ostrya virginiana, Carpinus caroliniana, Magnolia ashei, Prunus umbellata, Rhus copallina, Vaccinium arboreum, V. elliottii, Sebastiana fruticosa, and various lianas such as Vitis spp.

This is considered "one of rarest herbs in southeastern United States." The main threat to this rare species is the loss and degradation of its habitat. In Florida, some of the habitat has been converted to pine silviculture. While small amounts of logging may be beneficial to the plant by opening up the canopy, intense logging and clearcutting are destructive to the habitat. Erosion may follow. The plant is also affected by introduced species such as Lonicera japonica. Fire suppression has led to the loss of one vector of natural disturbance that keeps the forest open, leading to reduction of light levels, which results in decreased fruit production. Herbivory by caterpillars and perhaps deer is apparently a problem.

There are now "a couple dozen occurrences" remaining. Four populations are monitored at the Apalachicola Bluffs and Ravines Preserve by The Nature Conservancy.
