= Pruskortizia =

Scientific classification
- Kingdom: Plantae
- Clade: Tracheophytes
- Clade: Angiosperms
- Clade: Eudicots
- Clade: Asterids
- Order: Gentianales
- Family: Apocynaceae
- Genus: Pruskortizia; Morillo (2016)

Species
- Pruskortizia dasytricha (Schltr.) Morillo; Pruskortizia macrocarpa (Poepp.) Morillo

Genus of flowering plants in the dogbane family, Apocynaceae

Pruskortizia is a genus of flowering plants in the dogbane family, Apocynaceae. It includes two species native to northern South America, ranging from Colombia to Ecuador, Peru, Bolivia, and northern Brazil.
