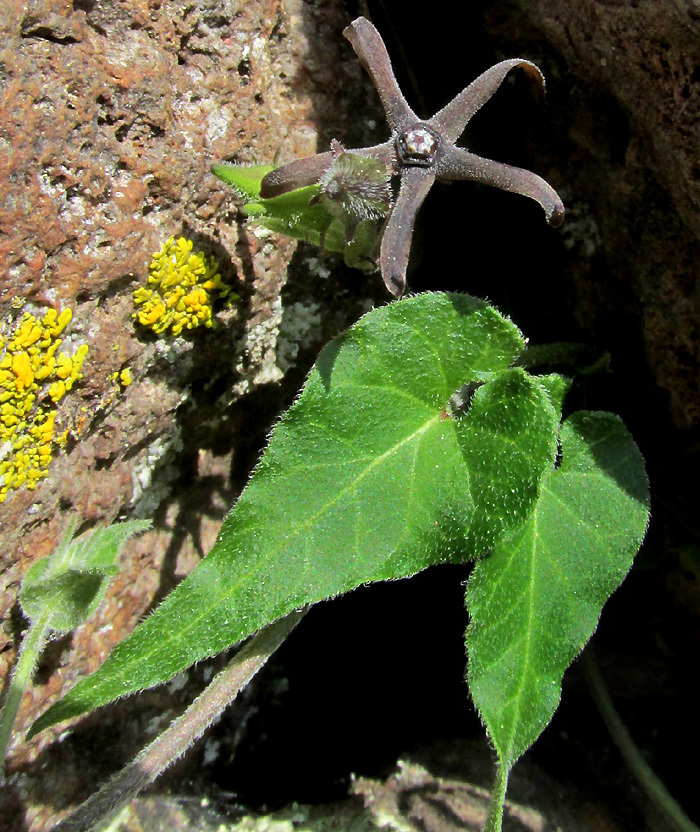
- Chthamalia ojadapantha in highland central Mexico

Scientific classification
- Kingdom: Plantae
- Clade: Tracheophytes
- Clade: Angiosperms
- Clade: Eudicots
- Clade: Asterids
- Order: Gentianales
- Family: Apocynaceae
- Subfamily: Asclepiadoideae
- Tribe: Asclepiadeae
- Subtribe: Gonolobinae
- Genus: Chthamalia; Decne.

Species
- 21; see text

= Chthamalia =

Genus of plants

Chthamalia is a genus of flowering plants in the dogbane family (Apocynaceae: Gonolobinae). The genus was first formally named in 1844. It contains approximately 21 species native to Mexico and the southern United States. Chthamalia is accepted as a genus by Plants of the World Online, but is considered by some others to be a synonym or a subgenus of Matelea.

21 SPECIES accepted by Plants of the World Online as of May 17, 2025:

- Chthamalia atrostellata Morillo | USA (Texas) & Mexico (Coahuila)
- Chthamalia biflora Decne. | USA (Oklahoma & south-central states)
- Chthamalia brevicoronata (B.L.Rob.) Morillo | USA (southern Texas)
- Chthamalia camporum (Brandegee) Morillo | Mexico (Coahuila)
- Chthamalia castanea (Brandegee) Morillo | Mexico (Puebla, Oaxaca)
- Chthamalia chihuahuensis (A.Gray) Morillo | USA (SW New Mexico) & northern Mexico
- Chthamalia cynanchoides (Engelm. & A.Gray) Morillo | USA (Central Oklahoma to SE Texas and W Louisiana
- Chthamalia decumbens (W.D.Stevens) L.O.Alvarado & E.B.Cortez | Mexico (Durango to México State)
- Chthamalia lesueurii (Standl.) Morillo | Mexico (Sonora, Chihuahua)
- Chthamalia nummularia Decne. | Mexico
- Chthamalia ojadapantha (L.O.Alvarado, S.Islas & M.G.Chávez) S.Islas & M.G.Chávez | Mexico (Querétaro to Oaxaca)
- Chthamalia parviflora (Torr.) L.O.Alvarado & E.B.Cortez | USA (Central & S Texas) and NE Mexico
- Chthamalia pedunculata Decne. | Mexico
- Chthamalia producta (Torr.) L.O.Alvarado & E.B.Cortez | USA (Arizona & Texas) and northern Mexico
- Chthamalia prostrata (Cav.) L.O.Alvarado & Cortez | Mexico (NE & central states)
- Chthamalia pubiflora Decne. | USA (SE Georgia & Florida)
- Chthamalia radiata (Correll) Morillo | USA (S Texas)
- Chthamalia schaffneri (A.Gray ex Hemsl.) L.O.Alvarado & M.G.Chávez | Mexico (NE states into Veracruz)
- Chthamalia tehuacana Castañeda-Zárate, M.G.Chávez & L.O.Alvarado | Mexico (Puebla)
- Chthamalia texensis (Correll) Morillo | USA (SW Texas)
- Chthamalia wootonii (Vail) Morillo | Mexico (Sonora, Chihuahua)
