= Zaccheus Collins =

American botanist (1764–1831)

Zaccheus Collins (1764–1831) was a botanist. He collected plants and owned a herbarium. He collected many plants from Pennsylvania and New Jersey, and was gifted specimens from southern statea including North Carolina and Georgia. The genus Collinsia is named after him.

He corresponded with botanists including Henry Muhlenberg, Frederick Augustus Hall Muhlenberg, Stephen Elliott, Jacob Bigelow, John Torrey and William Baldwin.

A Quaker, he was a philanthropist and belonged to the Academy of Natural Sciences, Philadelphia Linnean Society, and the American Philosophical Society in which he served as a curator.
