= Matelea variifolia =

Scientific classification
- Kingdom: Plantae
- Clade: Tracheophytes
- Clade: Angiosperms
- Clade: Eudicots
- Clade: Asterids
- Order: Gentianales
- Family: Apocynaceae
- Genus: Matelea
- Species: M. variifolia

Binomial name
- Matelea variifolia (Schltr.) Woodson

Synonyms
- Gonolobus variifolius Schltr.; Matelea borinquensis Alain; Vincetoxicum variifolium (Schltr.) Britton

Species of plant

Matelea variifolia, synonyms including Matelea borinquensis, known commonly as the San Lorenzo milkvine, is a species of flowering plant in the family Apocynaceae. It is a forest plant, endemic to Puerto Rico, and is found in Cerro Pelucho, San Lorenzo.
