= Pseudolachnostoma =

Scientific classification
- Kingdom: Plantae
- Clade: Tracheophytes
- Clade: Angiosperms
- Clade: Eudicots
- Clade: Asterids
- Order: Gentianales
- Family: Apocynaceae
- Subfamily: Asclepiadoideae
- Tribe: Asclepiadeae
- Genus: Pseudolachnostoma; Morillo (2012)

Genus of plants

Pseudolachnostoma is a genus of flowering plants belonging to the family Apocynaceae.

Its native range is Central and Southern Tropical America.

Species:

- Pseudolachnostoma bernardii Morillo
- Pseudolachnostoma brasiliense (Schltr.) Morillo
- Pseudolachnostoma colombianum Morillo
- Pseudolachnostoma cynanchiflorum (Woodson) Morillo
- Pseudolachnostoma ecuadorense Morillo
- Pseudolachnostoma freirei Morillo
- Pseudolachnostoma parviflorum Morillo
- Pseudolachnostoma quinindense Morillo
- Pseudolachnostoma reflexum (Hemsl.) Morillo
- Pseudolachnostoma schunkei Morillo
- Pseudolachnostoma sucrense Morillo
- Pseudolachnostoma woytkowskii Morillo
