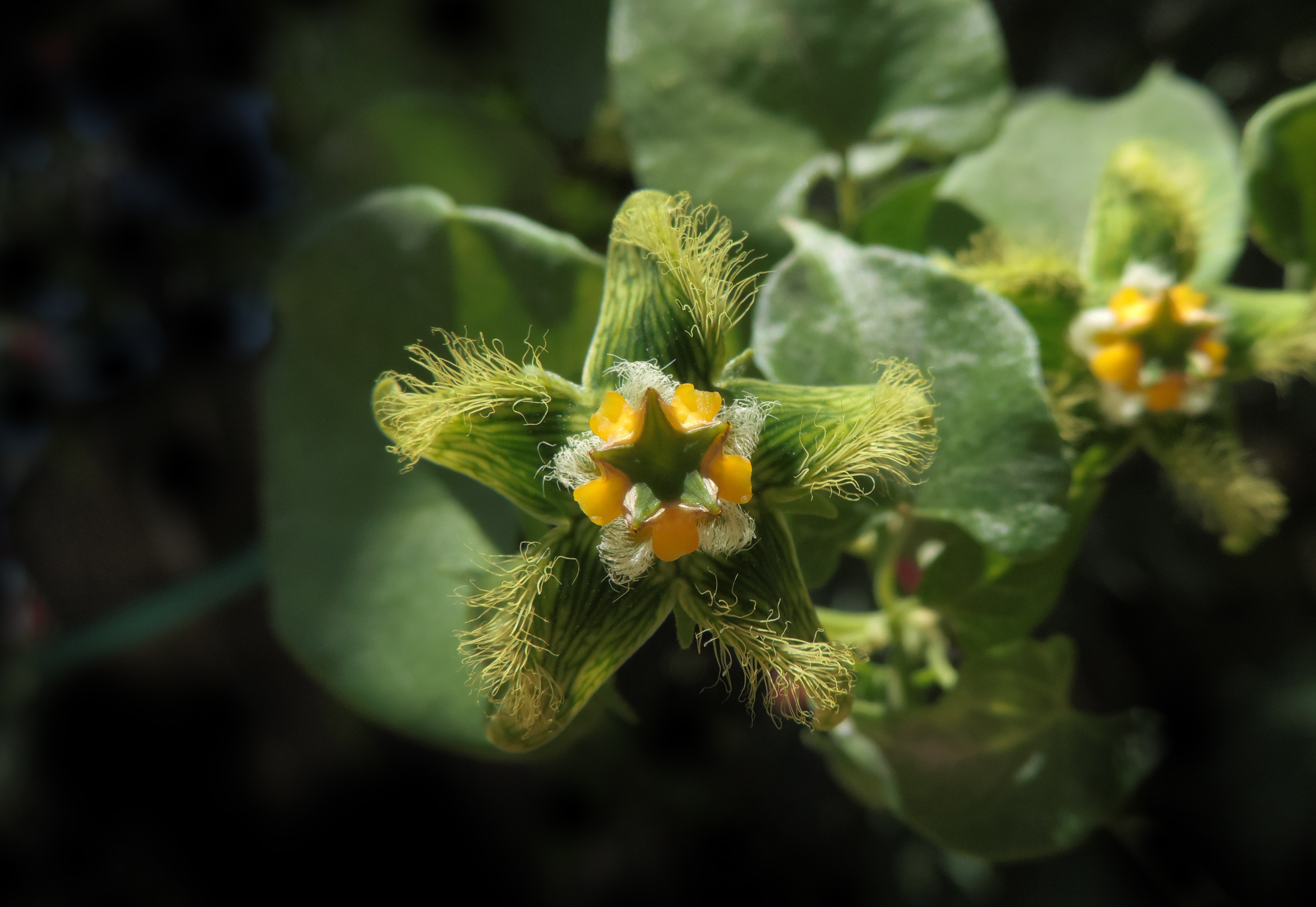

Scientific classification
- Kingdom: Plantae
- Clade: Tracheophytes
- Clade: Angiosperms
- Clade: Eudicots
- Clade: Asterids
- Order: Gentianales
- Family: Apocynaceae
- Genus: Gonolobus
- Species: G. barbatus

Binomial name
- Gonolobus barbatus Kunth 1818

= Gonolobus barbatus =

Species of plant

Gonolobus barbatus is a species of plant in the family Apocynaceae that is native to Campeche, Mexico.
