= Matelea lhotzkyana =

Scientific classification
- Kingdom: Plantae
- Clade: Tracheophytes
- Clade: Angiosperms
- Clade: Eudicots
- Clade: Asterids
- Order: Gentianales
- Family: Apocynaceae
- Genus: Matelea
- Species: M. lhotzkyana

Binomial name
- Matelea lhotzkyana (E.Fourn.) Fontella

Synonyms
- Lhotzkyella lhotzkyana (E.Fourn.); Pulvinaria lhotzkyana E.Fourn.

Species of plant

Matelea lhotzkyana is a species of flowering plant in the family Apocynaceae, native to northeast Brazil. It was first described by Eugène Fournier in 1885 as Pulvinaria lhotzkyana.
