= Bruceholstia =

Scientific classification
- Kingdom: Plantae
- Clade: Tracheophytes
- Clade: Angiosperms
- Clade: Eudicots
- Clade: Asterids
- Order: Gentianales
- Family: Apocynaceae
- Subfamily: Asclepiadoideae
- Tribe: Asclepiadeae
- Subtribe: Gonolobinae
- Genus: Bruceholstia; Morillo (2015)
- Species: B. sidifolia

Binomial name
- Bruceholstia sidifolia (M.Martens & Galeotti) L.O.Alvarado (2021)

Synonyms
- Bruceholstia magnifolia (Pittier) Morillo (2015); Gonolobus magnifolius Pittier (1910); Gonolobus sidifolius M.Martens & Galeotti (1844) (basionym); Matelea magnifolia (Pittier) Woodson (1941); Vincetoxicum hatchii Standl. (1937); Vincetoxicum magnifolium (Pittier) Standl. (1924)

Genus of flowering plants

Bruceholstia sidifolia is a species of flowering plant in the dogbane family, Apocynaceae. It is the sole species in genus Bruceholstia. It is a liana native to Mexico and Central America, ranging from northeastern Mexico to Panama.
