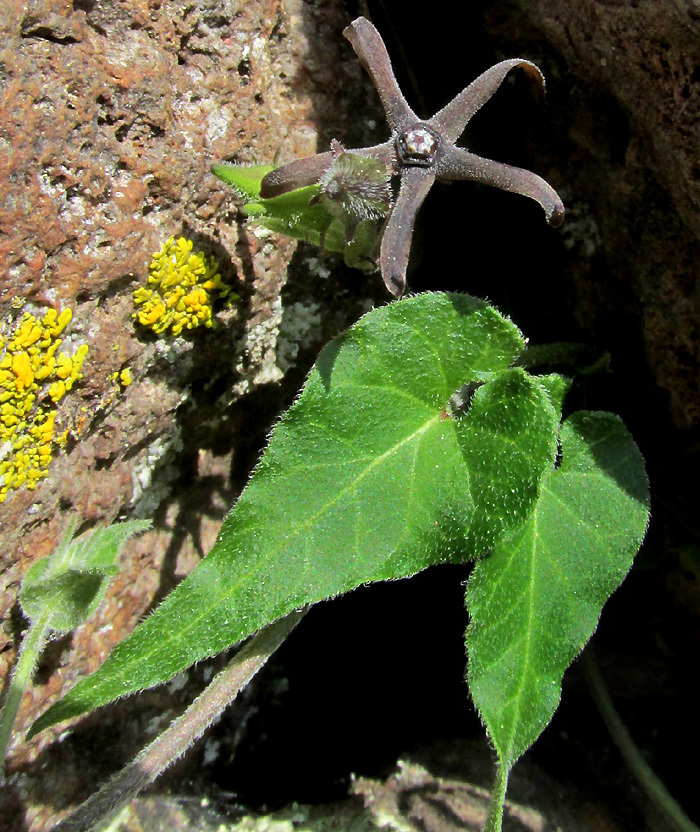
- Chthamalia ojadapantha in central Mexico

Scientific classification
- Kingdom: Plantae
- Clade: Embryophytes
- Clade: Tracheophytes
- Clade: Spermatophytes
- Clade: Angiosperms
- Clade: Eudicots
- Clade: Asterids
- Order: Gentianales
- Family: Apocynaceae
- Genus: Chthamalia
- Species: C. ojadapantha

Binomial name
- Chthamalia ojadapantha (L.O.Alvarado, S.Islas & M.G.Chávez) S.Islas & M.G.Chávez

= Chthamalia ojadapantha =

Species of flowering plant endemic to Mexico

Chthamalia ojadapantha is a species of flowering plant that is endemic to Mexico.

== Description ==
As seen on at the right, Chthamalia ojadapantha is a small, hairy, twining vine with greenish to dark purple flowers. The picture shows one twining between spaces of stones in rock wall in highland, central Mexico.

== Range ==
It is distributed in the central Mexican states of Querétaro south to Oaxaca.

== Habitat ==
Mainly it occurs in the seasonally dry tropical biome—in the species' distribution area, semi-arid "scrub" often dominated by mesquites and other similarly spiny trees and bushes.

== Taxonomy ==
The taxon was first published as Matelea ojadapantha L.O.Alvarado, S.Islas & M.G.Chávez, in Phytotaxa 461: 178 (2020). Later it was transferred to the genus Chthamalia as Chthamalia ojadapantha (L.O.Alvarado, S.Islas & M.G.Chávez) S.Islas & M.G.Chávez, in Phytoneuron 2021-47: 11 (2021).
