= Chloropetalum =

Scientific classification
- Kingdom: Plantae
- Clade: Tracheophytes
- Clade: Angiosperms
- Clade: Eudicots
- Clade: Asterids
- Order: Gentianales
- Family: Apocynaceae
- Genus: Chloropetalum; Morillo (2015)

Species
- 5; see text

Synonyms
- Tressensia H.A.Keller

Genus of flowering plants

Chloropetalum is a genus of flowering plants in the dogbane family, Apocynaceae. It includes five species native to the tropical Americas, ranging from Honduras through Central America and tropical South America to northeastern Argentina.

- Chloropetalum brasiliense Morillo
- Chloropetalum denticulatum (Vahl) Morillo
- Chloropetalum obtusiflorum (Decne.) Morillo
- Chloropetalum surinamense (Jonker) Morillo
- Chloropetalum viride (H.A.Keller & S.A.Cáceres) Morillo
