= Rhytidostemma =

Scientific classification
- Kingdom: Plantae
- Clade: Tracheophytes
- Clade: Angiosperms
- Clade: Eudicots
- Clade: Asterids
- Order: Gentianales
- Family: Apocynaceae
- Subfamily: Asclepiadoideae
- Tribe: Asclepiadeae
- Genus: Rhytidostemma; Morillo (2013)

Genus of plants

Rhytidostemma is a genus of flowering plants belonging to the family Apocynaceae.

Its native range is Panama to Southern Tropical America.

Species:

- Rhytidostemma badilloi (Morillo) Morillo
- Rhytidostemma floresii (Morillo) Morillo
- Rhytidostemma fontellanum Morillo
- Rhytidostemma hoffmanii (Morillo) Morillo
- Rhytidostemma laurae (Morillo) Morillo
- Rhytidostemma peruvianum (Morillo) Morillo
- Rhytidostemma surinamense (Morillo) Morillo
- Rhytidostemma viride (Moldenke) Morillo
