= Chthamalia pubiflora =

Conservation status
- Vulnerable (NatureServe)

Scientific classification
- Kingdom: Plantae
- Clade: Embryophytes
- Clade: Tracheophytes
- Clade: Spermatophytes
- Clade: Angiosperms
- Clade: Eudicots
- Clade: Asterids
- Order: Gentianales
- Family: Apocynaceae
- Genus: Chthamalia
- Species: C. pubiflora

Binomial name
- Chthamalia pubiflora Decne.

Synonyms
- Edisonia pubiflora (Decne.) Small; Gonolobus prostratus Baldwin; Gonolobus pubiflorus (Decne.) Engelm. & A.Gray; Matelea pubiflora (Decne.) Woodson; Vincetoxicum pubiflorum (Decne.) A.Heller

Species of flowering plant

Chthamalia pubiflora (syn. Matelea pubiflora), the trailing milkvine or sandhill spiny pod, is a species of flowering plant in the Apocynaceae family, native to southeastern Georgia and peninsular Florida. It is in the Asclepiadaceae (milkweed) subfamily. A perennial vine, it has reddish-brown or light green flowers. The petals have long white hairs on them.
