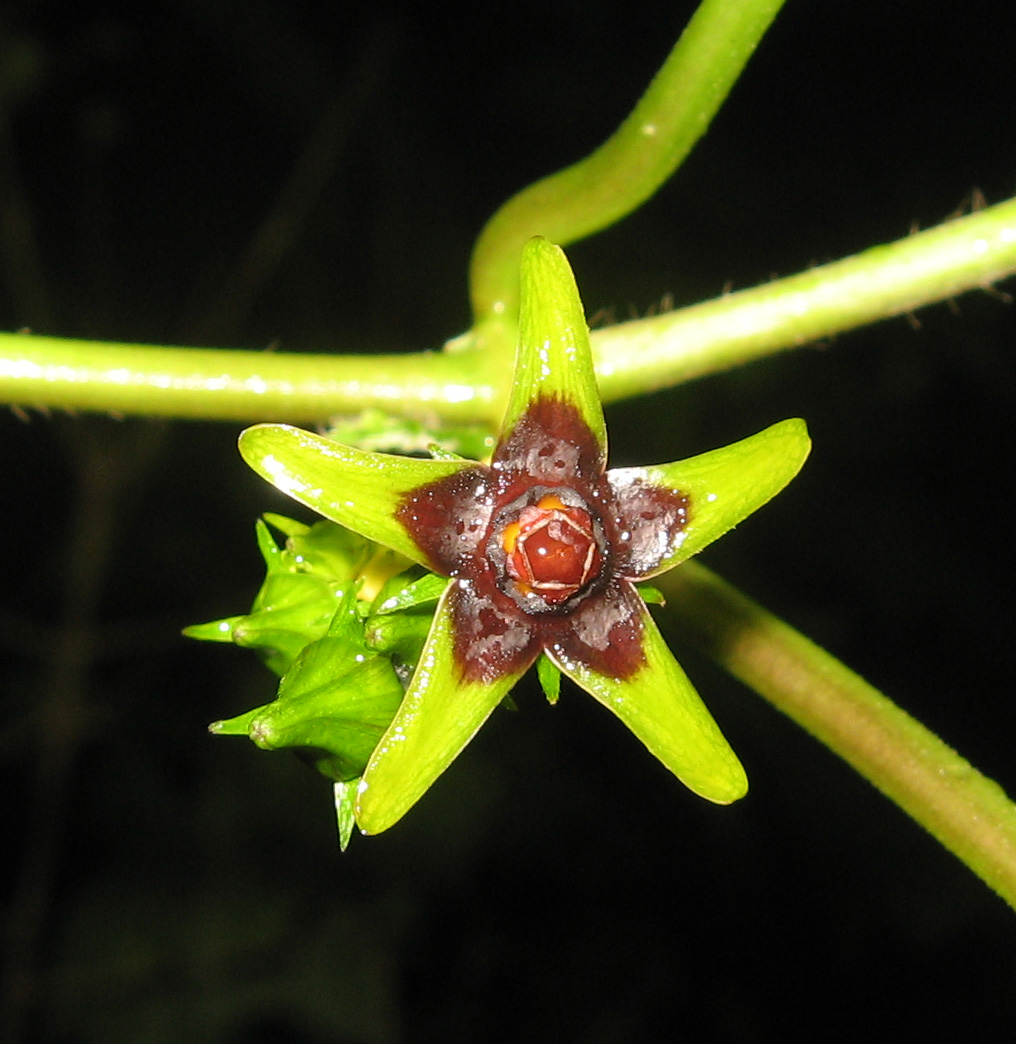
- Gonolobus suberosus inflorescence

Scientific classification
- Kingdom: Plantae
- Clade: Tracheophytes
- Clade: Angiosperms
- Clade: Eudicots
- Clade: Asterids
- Order: Gentianales
- Family: Apocynaceae
- Subfamily: Asclepiadoideae
- Tribe: Asclepiadeae
- Genus: Gonolobus; Michx. (1803)

Type species
- Gonolobus macrophyllus Michx.

Synonyms
- Baclea E.Fourn. (1877), not validly publ.; Exolobus E.Fourn. (1885); Fimbristemma Turcz. (1852); Microstelma Baill. (1890), not validly publ.; Trichostelma Baill. (1890); Vincetoxicum Walter (1788), nom. illeg.

= Gonolobus =

Genus of plants

Gonolobus is a genus of plant in family Apocynaceae, first described in 1803. It is native to South America, Central America, Mexico, the West Indies, and the southern United States.

== Species ==
124 species are accepted.

- Gonolobus absalonensis Krings – Martinique
- Gonolobus albiflorus W.D.Stevens – Jalisco
- Gonolobus albomarginatus (Pittier) Woodson – Nicaragua to Ecuador
- Gonolobus aloiensis Krings & F.S.Axelrod – St. Eustatius
- Gonolobus ancorifer W.D.Stevens – Veracruz to Honduras
- Gonolobus antennatus Schltr. – Colombia and Venezuela
- Gonolobus antioquensis Morillo – Colombia
- Gonolobus aristolochiifolius (Brandegee) Woodson – Guatemala and Chiapas
- Gonolobus aristolochioides Kunth – Venezuela
- Gonolobus arizonicus (A.Gray) Woodson – Arizona
- Gonolobus asper Decne. – Oaxaca
- Gonolobus asterias W.D.Stevens – Costa Rica
- Gonolobus bakeri Schltr. – Cuba
- Gonolobus barbatus Kunth – Veracruz to Honduras
- Gonolobus bifidus Hemsl. – San Luis Potosí
- Gonolobus breedlovei L.O.Williams – Chiapas
- Gonolobus caamalii Carnevali & Duno – Yucatán
- Gonolobus calcaratus (Woodson) L.O.Alvarado & Velazco – northeastern Mexico
- Gonolobus calycosus (Donn.Smm.) Woodson – Guatemala to Nicaragua
- Gonolobus campii Morillo – Ecuador
- Gonolobus caucanus Morillo – Cauca in Colombia
- Gonolobus cearensis Malme – Ceará in Brazil
- Gonolobus chiapensis (Brandegee) Woodson – Chiapas and Guatemala
- Gonolobus chiriquensis (Woodson) Woodson – Panama and Costa Rica
- Gonolobus chloranthus Schltdl. – Veracruz
- Gonolobus colombianus Morillo – Colombia
- Gonolobus croceus W.D.Stevens – Sinaloa and Nayarit
- Gonolobus cteniophorus (S.F.Blake) Woodson – Veracruz to Honduras
- Gonolobus cuajayote W.D.Stevens – Chiapas, El Salvador, Nicaragua
- Gonolobus dasystephanus (S.F.Blake) Woodson – Haiti
- Gonolobus dorothyanus Fontella & E.A.Schwarz – Rio de Janeiro
- Gonolobus dussii Krings – Guadeloupe and Martinique
- Gonolobus edulis Hemsl. – Panama, Costa Rica
- Gonolobus erianthus Decne. – Nuevo León + Nayarit to Honduras
- Gonolobus eriocladon Benth. – Panama, Colombia
- Gonolobus esmeraldasianus Morillo – Ecuador
- Gonolobus espejoi G.M.Hern.-Barón, Hern.-Barón & López-Ferr. – Veracruz
- Gonolobus exannulatus W.D.Stevens – Chiapas, Guatemala
- Gonolobus farenholtzii Markgr. – Venezuela
- Gonolobus fimbriatiflorus (Morillo) W.D.Stevens – Nicaragua, Panama, Costa Rica, Ecuador
- Gonolobus fraternus Schltdl. – Veracruz to Honduras
- Gonolobus fuscoviolaceus Woodson – Panama, Costa Rica
- Gonolobus fuscus Decne. – Michoacán
- Gonolobus germanianus Morillo – Venezuela
- Gonolobus gonocarpos (Walter) L.M.Perry – central and southeastern United States
- Gonolobus grandiflorus (Cav.) Schult. – Oaxaca
- Gonolobus grayumii W.D.Stevens – Panama, Costa Rica
- Gonolobus gritensis Morillo – Cuba
- †Gonolobus haussknechtii K.Schum. – Mexico?
- Gonolobus heterophyllus (Hemsl.) W.D.Stevens – Costa Rica, Nicaragua, Panama
- Gonolobus hystrix (Vell.) Decne. – Brazil
- Gonolobus inaequalis L.O.Williams – Panama, Honduras, Colombia
- Gonolobus incerianus W.D.Stevens & Montiel – Veracruz to Nicaragua
- Gonolobus iyanolensis Krings – St. Lucia Island in West Indies
- Gonolobus jaliscensis B.L.Rob. & Greenm. – Oaxaca, Jalisco
- Gonolobus lachnostomoides Schltr. – Columbia
- Gonolobus lanugiflorus Woodson – Guatemala
- Gonolobus lasiostomus Decne. – Venezuela
- Gonolobus latisinuatus (Woodson) L.O.Alvarado & Velazco – Tamaulipas
- Gonolobus leianthus Donn.Sm. – Tabasco to Nicaragua
- Gonolobus lewisii L.O.Williams – Colombia, Panama
- Gonolobus lozadae L.O.Alvarado, E.B.Cortez & C.Cerv. – Oaxaca
- Gonolobus luridus Decne. – Hidalgo and Veracruz
- †Gonolobus macranthus – Mexico?
- Gonolobus macrotis Morillo – Colombia
- Gonolobus manarae Morillo - Venezuela
- Gonolobus marginatus Schltr. – Peru
- Gonolobus marmoreus (Woodson) Morillo – Colombia
- Gonolobus martinicensis Decne. – Martinique
- Gonolobus membranaceus Schltr. – Haiti
- Gonolobus micranthus Hook.f. ex Hemsl. – Fernando de Noronha Islands of Brazil
- Gonolobus mollis Regel – Brazil
- Gonolobus murphyae Krings & Morillo – Panama
- Gonolobus naturalistae M.G.Chávez, Pío-León & L.O.Alvarado – Chihuahua and Sinaloa
- Gonolobus nemorosus Decne. – Oaxaca
- Gonolobus niger (Cav.) Schult. – Veracruz to Guatemala
- Gonolobus ophioglossa Woodson – Panama, Costa Rica, Ecuador
- Gonolobus ottonis K.Koch & C.D.Bouché – Cuba
- Gonolobus pallidus W.D.Stevens – Chiapas
- Gonolobus parviflorus Decne. – Peru
- Gonolobus pectinatus Brandegee – Puebla
- Gonolobus peruanus Schltr. – Peru
- Gonolobus plowmanii Regel – Jamaica
- Gonolobus purpureus Morillo – Peru
- Gonolobus retusus (Vell.) Decne. – southeastern Brazil
- Gonolobus riparius Kunth – Colombia and Venezuela
- Gonolobus roeanus L.O.Williams – Guatemala
- Gonolobus rostratus (Vahl) Schult. – Brazil
- Gonolobus rotundus M.E.Jones – Chihuahua
- Gonolobus sagasteguii Morillo – Peru
- Gonolobus salvinii Hemsl. – Belize, Guatemala, Honduras, El Salvador
- Gonolobus sandersii W.D.Stevens – Jalisco, Colima
- Gonolobus saraguranus Morillo – Ecuador
- Gonolobus scaber K.Schum. – Venezuela
- Gonolobus sororius A.Gray ex S.Watson – Jalisco
- Gonolobus spiranthus Juárez-Jaimes, W.D.Stevens & Lozada-Pérez – Oaxaca
- Gonolobus stapelioides Desv. – Tobago
- Gonolobus stellatus Griseb. – Jamaica
- Gonolobus stenanthus (Standl.) Woodson – Tabasco to Honduras
- Gonolobus stenosepalus (Donn.Sm.) Woodson – Chiapas, Guatemala, Honduras
- Gonolobus stephanotrichus Griseb. – Cuba
- Gonolobus stipitatus Morillo – Colombia
- Gonolobus striatus M.Martens & Galeotti – Mexico
- Gonolobus suberosus (L.) R.Br. – SE + SC North America
- Gonolobus taylorianus W.D.Stevens & Montiel – Central America
- Gonolobus tenuisepalus Krings – Costa Rica
- Gonolobus tetragonus (Vell.) Decne. – Brazil
- Gonolobus tingens Decne. – Hidalgo
- Gonolobus tobagensis Urb. – Tobago
- Gonolobus triflorus M.Martens & Galeotti – Oaxaca
- Gonolobus truncatifolius W.D.Stevens – Costa Rica and Panama
- Gonolobus uniflorus Kunth – Oaxaca to Honduras
- Gonolobus ustulatus W.D.Stevens – Costa Rica
- Gonolobus variabilis W.D.Stevens – Costa Rica
- Gonolobus versicolor Woodson – Veracruz to Honduras
- Gonolobus virescens Desv. – Jamaica
- Gonolobus waitukubuliensis Krings – Dominica
- Gonolobus xanthotrichus Brandegee – Veracruz
- Gonolobus youroumaynensis Krings – St. Vincent in West Indies
- Gonolobus zuliensis Morillo – northwestern Venezuela
