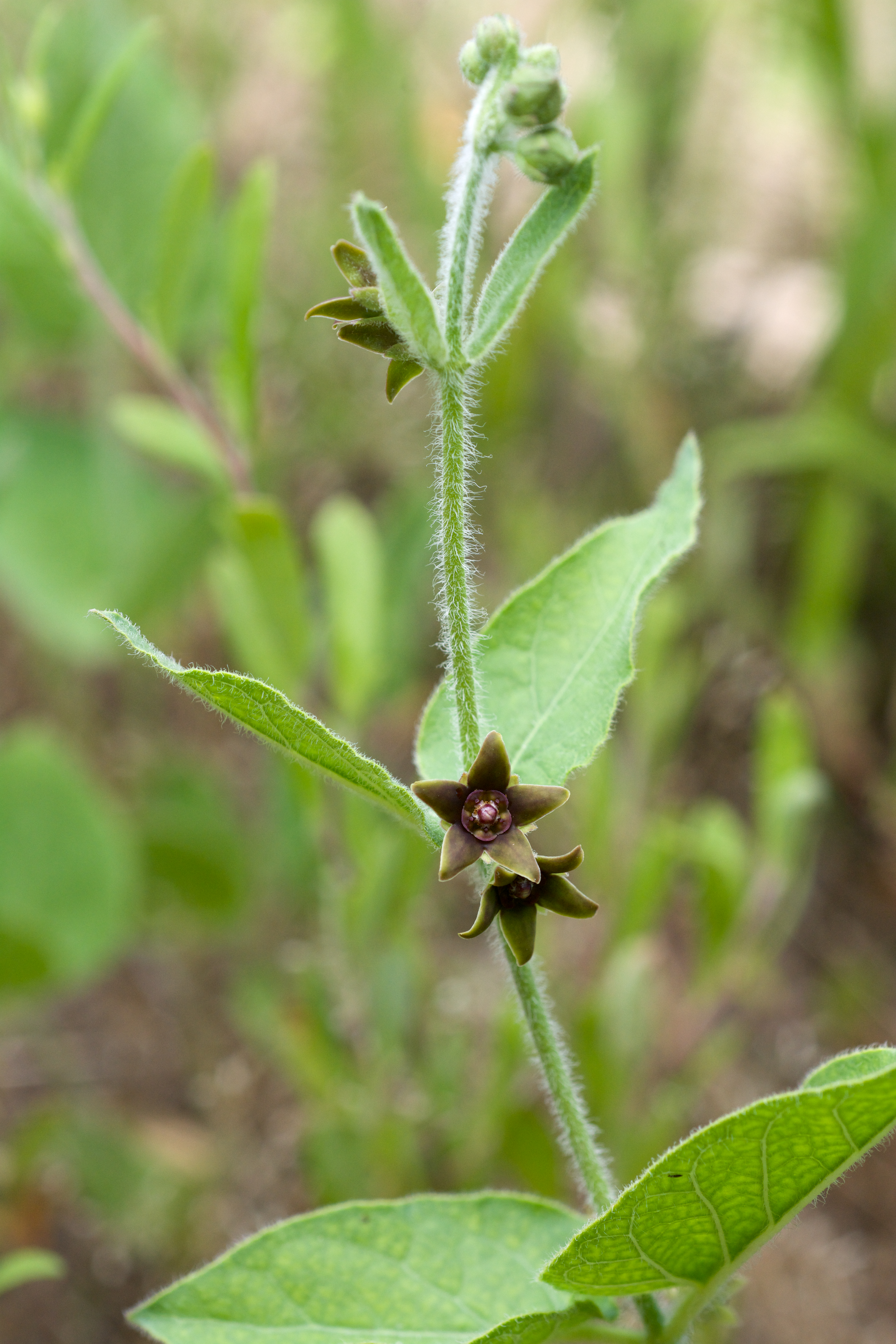

Scientific classification
- Kingdom: Plantae
- Clade: Tracheophytes
- Clade: Angiosperms
- Clade: Eudicots
- Clade: Asterids
- Order: Gentianales
- Family: Apocynaceae
- Genus: Matelea
- Species: M. cynanchoides

Binomial name
- Matelea cynanchoides (Engelm. & A.Gray) Woodson

= Matelea cynanchoides =

Species of flowering plant

Matelea cynanchoides, commonly called prairie milkvine, is a species of plant in the dogbane family that is native to south-central United States.

It is a perennial that produces yellow, maroon, or green flowers in the spring on non-twining vines.
