= Gonolobus campii =

Conservation status
- Endangered (IUCN 3.1)

Scientific classification
- Kingdom: Plantae
- Clade: Tracheophytes
- Clade: Angiosperms
- Clade: Eudicots
- Clade: Asterids
- Order: Gentianales
- Family: Apocynaceae
- Genus: Gonolobus
- Species: G. campii

Binomial name
- Gonolobus campii Morillo

Species of plant

Gonolobus campii is a species of plant in the family Apocynaceae. It is endemic to Ecuador. It is threatened by habitat loss.
