= Matelea parvifolia =

Scientific classification
- Kingdom: Plantae
- Clade: Tracheophytes
- Clade: Angiosperms
- Clade: Eudicots
- Clade: Asterids
- Order: Gentianales
- Family: Apocynaceae
- Genus: Matelea
- Species: M. parvifolia

Binomial name
- Matelea parvifolia (Torr.) Woodson

Species of plant

Spearleaf (Matelea parvifolia) in the United States

Matelea parvifolia is a species of flowering plant in the family Apocynaceae known by the common names spearleaf . It is native to the southwestern United States and northern Mexico, where it grows in and on the edges of deserts. It is a perennial herb with a branching, twining green stem lined sparsely with heart-shaped leaves no more than 2 centimetres (3/4 in) long. The flowers appear in the leaf axils. They are purplish or brownish green in color with a nub at each inner corner of the corolla lobes. The fruit is a long follicle which may be up to 7 centimetres (2 3/4 in) long.
