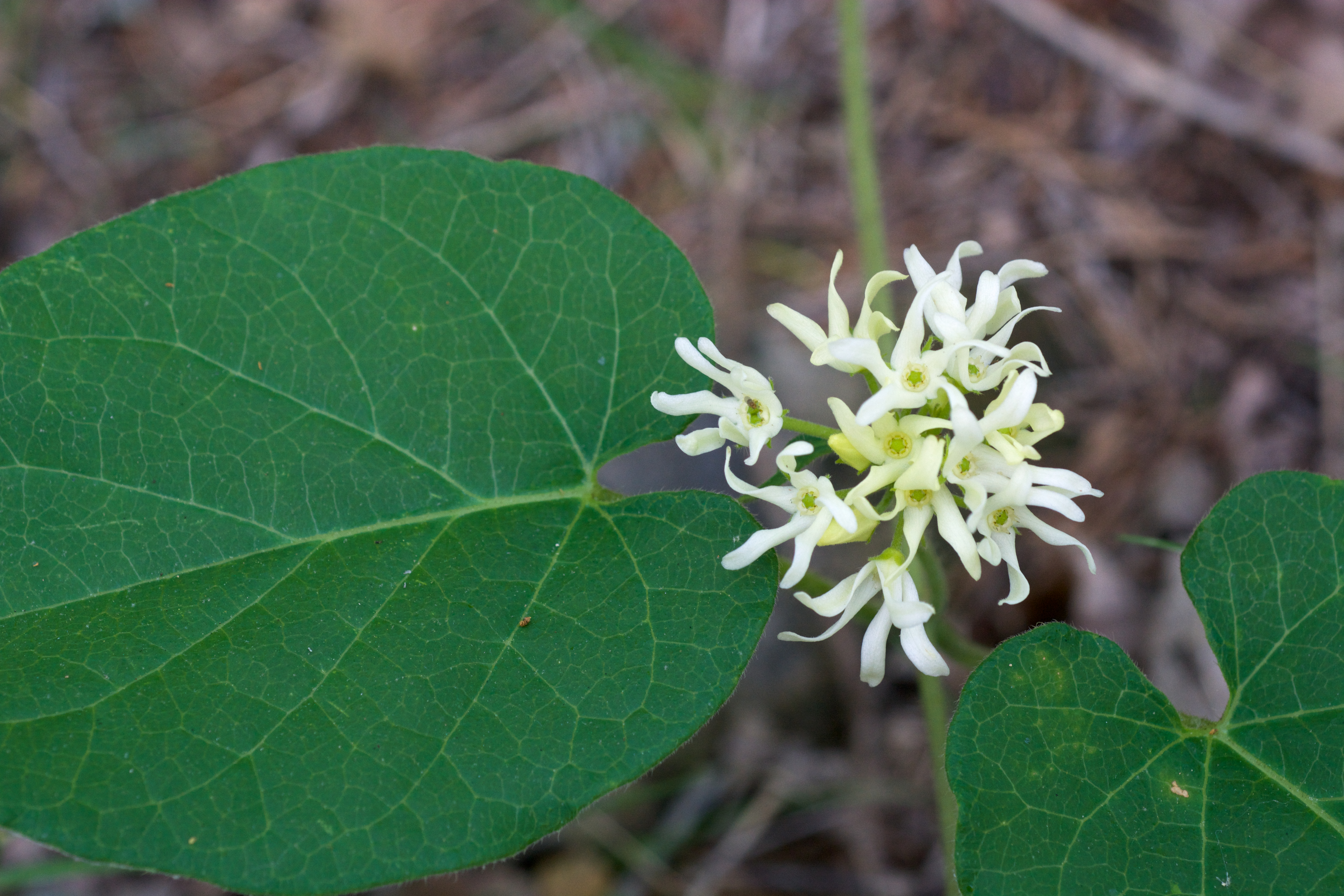

Conservation status
- Vulnerable (NatureServe)

Scientific classification
- Kingdom: Plantae
- Clade: Tracheophytes
- Clade: Angiosperms
- Clade: Eudicots
- Clade: Asterids
- Order: Gentianales
- Family: Apocynaceae
- Genus: Matelea
- Species: M. baldwyniana

Binomial name
- Matelea baldwyniana (Sweet) Woodson

Synonyms
- List: Gonolobus baldwynianus Sweet; Odontostephana baldwyniana (Sweet) Alexander; Vincetoxicum baldwynianum (Sweet) Britton; Gonolobus caronlinensis Nutt.

= Matelea baldwyniana =

Species of plant

Matelea baldwyniana is a species of climbing or trailing vine with white flowers in the family Apocynaceae (dogbane), known by the common name Baldwin's milkvine and white spinypod. It previously belonged to the family Asclepiadaceae (milkweed). It is native to the central and southeastern United States.

== Description ==
M. baldwyniana is a perennial herbaceous vine that climbs or trails on other vegetation, reaching a height of about 3 m (10 ft). The stems are brownish, hairy, and have a milky sap. The leaves are green, broadly ovate, and opposite, with smooth margins. The leaves are 5–16 cm (2.0–6.3 in) long on hairy petioles that are 5–6 cm (2.0–2.4 in) long.

The flowers, borne in clusters of 15 or more on long peduncles, are white with a disc-like central column with five anthers and five twisting white petals that are joined at the base. Seed pods are 6.5–9 cm (2.6–3.5 in) long and contain flat, round seeds with many long, white hairs, similar to other milkweeds.

== Etymology ==
The specific epithet honors American botanist William Baldwin (1779–1819).

== Distribution and habitat ==
Matelea baldwyniana is native to the central and southeastern United States in the states of Oklahoma, Arkansas, Missouri, Mississippi, Alabama, Georgia, and Florida. The plant is mostly present in Arkansas and Missouri, with only isolated populations or historical references in the other states. Its habitat is forest clearings, woods, slopes of ravines, glades, and savannas.

== Ecology ==
Flowering occurs April to June. M. baldwyniana is a host plant for caterpillars of the monarch butterfly.
