= Matelea lanata =

Scientific classification
- Kingdom: Plantae
- Clade: Embryophytes
- Clade: Tracheophytes
- Clade: Spermatophytes
- Clade: Angiosperms
- Clade: Eudicots
- Clade: Asterids
- Order: Gentianales
- Family: Apocynaceae
- Genus: Matelea
- Species: M. lanata

Binomial name
- Matelea lanata (Zucc.) Woodson

Synonyms
- Trichosacme lanata Zucc.

Species of flowering plant

Matelea lanata, synonym Trichosacme lanata, is a species of flowering plant in the family Apocynaceae native to northeastern Mexico. When placed in the genus Trichosacme, it was the only species.
