= Gonolobus naturalistae =

Scientific classification
- Kingdom: Plantae
- Clade: Tracheophytes
- Clade: Angiosperms
- Clade: Eudicots
- Clade: Asterids
- Order: Gentianales
- Family: Apocynaceae
- Genus: Gonolobus
- Species: G. naturalistae

Binomial name
- Gonolobus naturalistae M.G. Chávez, Pío-León & L.O. Alvarado

Species of plant

Gonolobus naturalistae is a species of perennial vine in the milkweed genus Gonolobus. It is endemic to Mexico.

== Taxonomy ==
Gonolobus naturalistae was first described in 2020 by Leonardo O. Alvarado-Cárdenas, María Guadalupe Chávez Hernández, and Juan Fernando Pio Leon. It was named in honor of NaturaLista, a partnership between iNaturalist and the Comisión Nacional para el Conocimiento y Uso de la Biodiversidad (CONABIO).

== Distribution and habitat ==
This species is found in tropical dry forests of Chihuahua and Sinaloa in Mexico.

== Ecology ==
This species often grows in the company of Pithecellobium dulce as well as species within the genus Vachellia.
