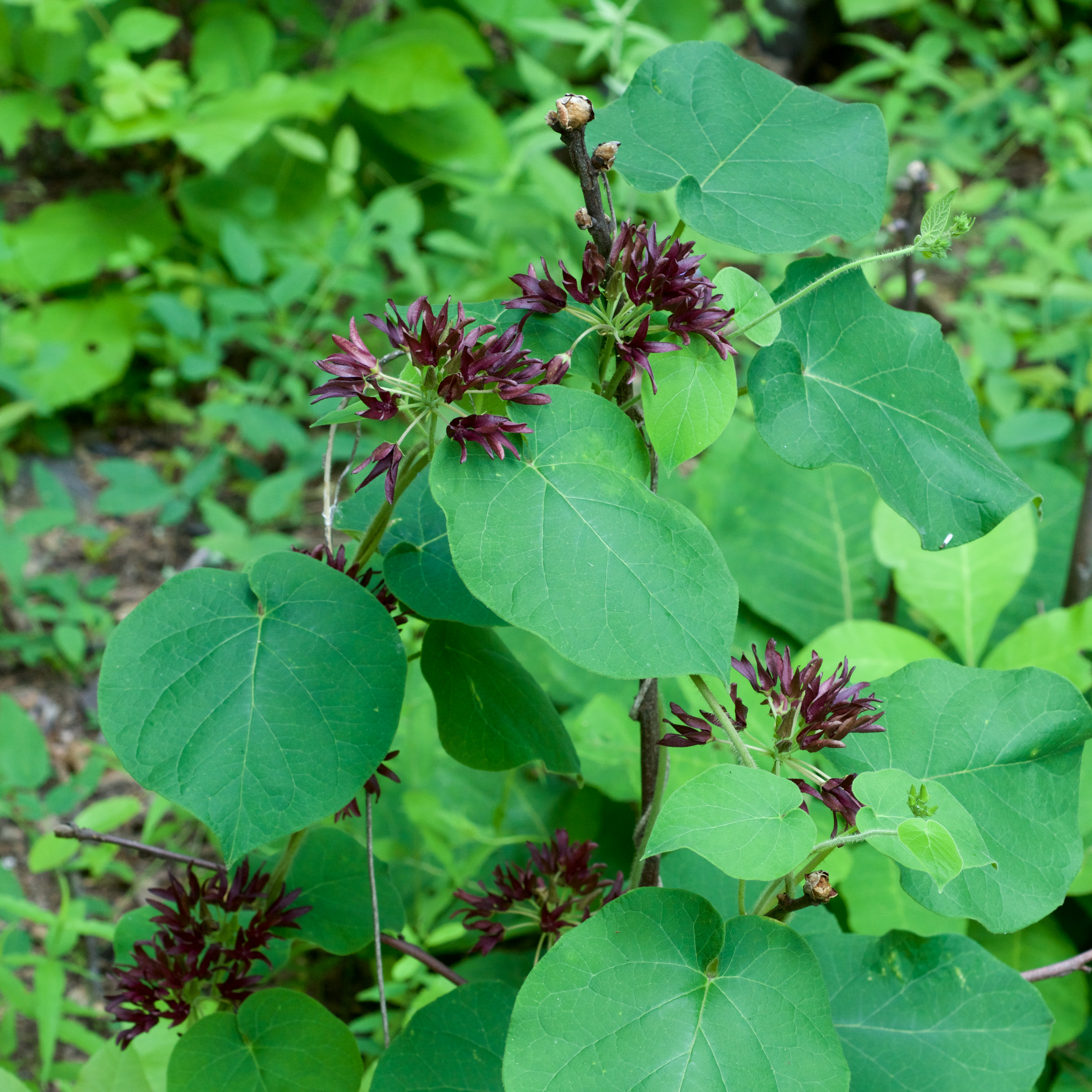

Conservation status
- Secure (NatureServe)

Scientific classification
- Kingdom: Plantae
- Clade: Tracheophytes
- Clade: Angiosperms
- Clade: Eudicots
- Clade: Asterids
- Order: Gentianales
- Family: Apocynaceae
- Genus: Matelea
- Species: M. decipiens

Binomial name
- Matelea decipiens (Alexander) Woodson

= Matelea decipiens =

Species of plant

Matelea decipiens is a species of flowering plant in the family Apocynaceae known by the common name oldfield milkvine. It is native to the southeastern United States, where it grows in open deciduous woods and stream banks. It is a perennial twining vine forb/herb with milky sap and 5 to 10 cm heart-shaped leaves. The vine dies back and returns every year. The 1 to 2 cm flowers are deep purple, occasionally yellow. The fruit is a follicle.
