= Matelea sintenisii =

Scientific classification
- Kingdom: Plantae
- Clade: Tracheophytes
- Clade: Angiosperms
- Clade: Eudicots
- Clade: Asterids
- Order: Gentianales
- Family: Apocynaceae
- Genus: Matelea
- Species: M. sintenisii

Binomial name
- Matelea sintenisii (Schltr.) Woodson

Species of plant

Matelea sintenisii, known commonly as the Sintenis' milkvine, is a species of plant in the family Apocynaceae. It is endemic to Puerto Rico, and is found in forests and moist districts.
