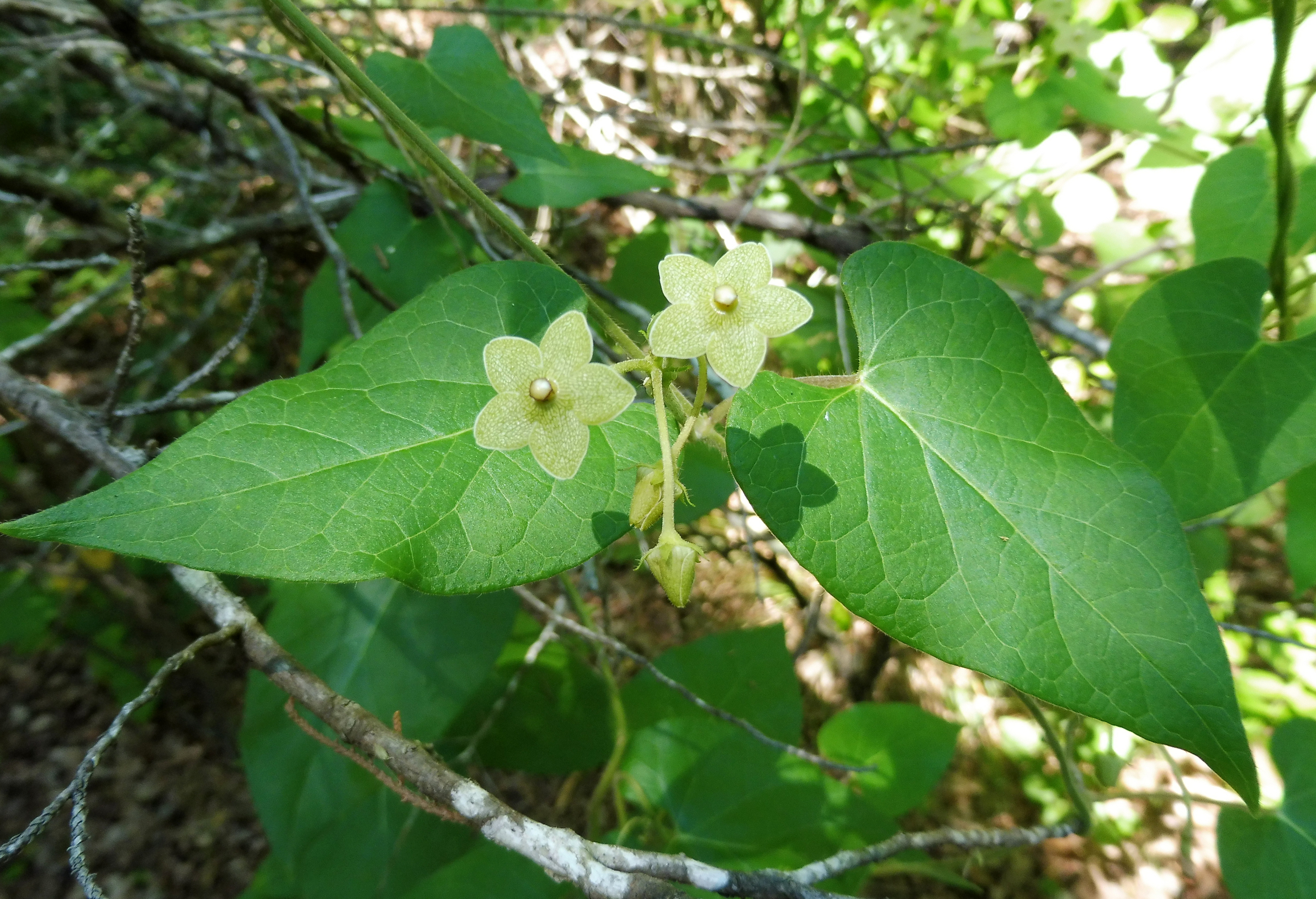

Scientific classification
- Kingdom: Plantae
- Clade: Tracheophytes
- Clade: Angiosperms
- Clade: Eudicots
- Clade: Asterids
- Order: Gentianales
- Family: Apocynaceae
- Genus: Matelea
- Species: M. reticulata

Binomial name
- Matelea reticulata (Engelm. ex A.Gray) Woodson

= Matelea reticulata =

Species of flowering plant

Matelea reticulata, commonly called Pearl Milkweed Vine, Netted Milkvine, Green Milkweed Vine, Net Vein Milkvine, is a species of flowering plant in the dogbane family (Apocynaceae). It is native North America, where it is endemic to the U.S. state of Texas.

== Description ==
Matelea reticulata is an herbaceous perennial vine that can reach up to 12 ft in length. In the spring and summer it produces green-white, star-shaped flowers with a glistening "pearl" in the center. It fruits from May through February, producing large, spiked seed pods which open to release seeds attached to soft, silky threads.

== Habitat ==
Matelea reticulata is found in thickets on rocky hillsides. It prefers dry, sandy or rocky soil.

== Ecology ==
Matelea reticulata, like all milkweeds, is a larval host to Queen and Monarch butterflies. Milkweeds contain cardiac glycosides which the caterpillars and adult butterflies store in their bodies to deter vertebrate predators.
