= Graciemoriana =

Scientific classification
- Kingdom: Plantae
- Clade: Tracheophytes
- Clade: Angiosperms
- Clade: Eudicots
- Clade: Asterids
- Order: Gentianales
- Family: Apocynaceae
- Genus: Graciemoriana; Morillo (2015)
- Species: G. gracieae

Binomial name
- Graciemoriana gracieae (Morillo) Morillo (2015)

Synonyms
- Matelea gracieae Morillo (1998)

Genus of flowering plants

Graciemoriana gracieae is a species of flowering plant in the dogbane family, Apocynaceae. It is the sole species in genus Graciemoriana. It is endemic to French Guiana.

The species was first described as Matelea gracieae in 1998 by Gilberto N. Morillo. In 2015 Morillo renamed it Graciemoriana gracieae, placing it in its own monotypic genus.
