= Rotundanthus =

Scientific classification
- Kingdom: Plantae
- Clade: Tracheophytes
- Clade: Angiosperms
- Clade: Eudicots
- Clade: Asterids
- Order: Gentianales
- Family: Apocynaceae
- Genus: Rotundanthus; Morillo (2015)
- Species: R. fulvidus

Binomial name
- Rotundanthus fulvidus (F.Ballard) Morillo (2015)

Synonyms
- Gonolobus fulvidus F.Ballard (1940); Matelea fulvida (F.Ballard) W.D.Stevens (1999); Matelea grandiflora Standl. (1941), nom. superfl.; Vincetoxicum grandiflorum Standl. (1935), nom. illeg.

Genus of flowering plants

Rotundanthus fulvidus is a species of flowering plant in the dogbane family, Apocynaceae. It is the sole species in genus Rotundanthus. It is a liana native to southeastern Mexico and Central America, ranging from the Mexican state of Chiapas to Guatemala, Belize, Honduras, Nicaragua, and Costa Rica.

The species was first described as Gonolobus fulvidus by Francis Ballard in 1940. In 2015 Gilberto N. Morillo renamed it Rotundanthus fulvidus, placing it in its own monotypic genus.
