= Gonolobus arizonicus =

Scientific classification
- Kingdom: Plantae
- Clade: Tracheophytes
- Clade: Angiosperms
- Clade: Eudicots
- Clade: Asterids
- Order: Gentianales
- Family: Apocynaceae
- Genus: Gonolobus
- Species: G. arizonicus

Binomial name
- Gonolobus arizonicus (A.Gray) Woodson

Synonyms
- Lachnostoma arizonicum A.Gray; Matelea arizonica (A.Gray) Shinners

Species of plant

Gonolobus arizonicus, common name Arizona milkvine, is a species of plant in the family Apocynaceae. It is endemic to Arizona, found in Pima, Santa Cruz, Pinal, and Graham Counties.
