= William Baldwin (botanist) =

American physician and botanist

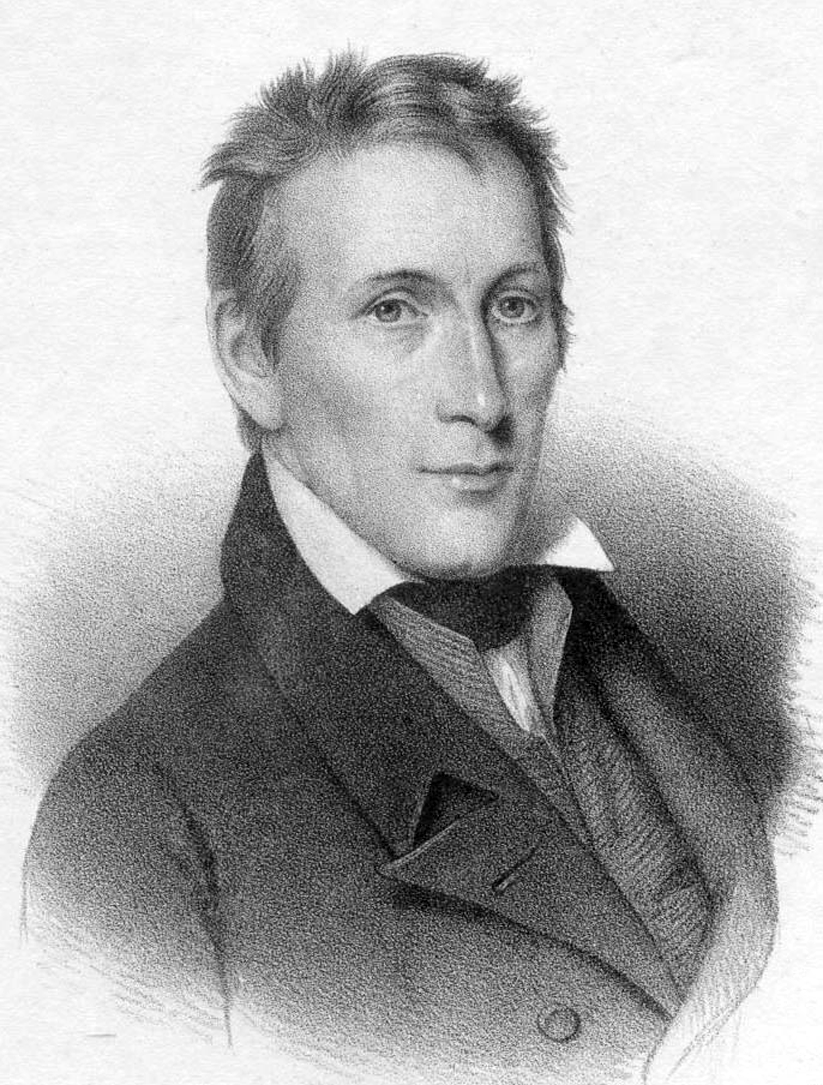
- Baldwin in 1843
- Born: March 29, 1779 September 1, 1819); Newlin Township, Chester County, Pennsylvania, US
- Died: September 1, 1819 (aged 40); Franklin, Missouri, US
- Education: University of Pennsylvania (MD)
- Scientific career
- Fields: Botany
- Author abbrev. (botany): Baldwin

William Baldwin (March 29, 1779 – September 1, 1819) was an American physician and botanist who is today remembered for his significant contributions to botanical studies, especially Cyperaceae. He lived in Pennsylvania, Delaware, and Georgia, and served as a ship's surgeon on two voyages overseas. He published only two scientific papers, but his major contributions were in the knowledge that he imparted to other botanists in his letters to them and in the thousands of specimens that he provided for their herbaria. He wrote letters to Henry Muhlenberg, Stephen Elliott, William Darlington, Zaccheus Collins, and others. His most important collections were from Georgia, Florida, and eastern South America. When he died, he left a large herbarium that proved to be of great value, especially to Lewis David von Schweinitz, John Torrey, and Asa Gray. He had a special interest in the plant family Cyperaceae and his incomplete, unpublished manuscripts were a major source for monographs by John Torrey and Asa Gray. The historian Joseph Ewan has said that "Baldwin's treatment of a number of genera, especially in the Cyperaceae, showed penetrating observation, understanding, and diagnosis". The genus Balduina was named for him by Thomas Nuttall.

== Pennsylvania ==
William Baldwin was born in Newlin Township, Pennsylvania, a small township about one kilometer southeast of Embreeville in Chester County. He was the son of Elizabeth Baldwin (nee Garretson) and Thomas Baldwin, a Quaker minister. He suffered from poor health all of his life because of chronic tuberculosis, and like the rest of his family, he would die of it. At the time, his condition was called hereditary tuberculosis, but it is now known that tuberculosis is an infectious disease.

William Baldwin had little formal education, but he had a thirst for knowledge and became a school teacher at a young age. When he was not teaching class, he was in Downingtown, Chester County, studying medicine under Dr. William A. Todd. It was here that he met Moses Marshall, the nephew of botanist Humphry Marshall. He sometimes went with Moses Marshall to Marshallton in Chester County to study the botanic garden that his uncle had established there. Thus began the young Baldwin's lifelong enthusiasm for botany In 1802, he took one course in medicine at the University of Tennessee, but soon ran out of money, and returned to his studies under Dr. Todd.

It was near the end of 1802 when he began his medical studies at the University of Pennsylvania in Philadelphia. One of his teachers, Benjamin Smith Barton, encouraged his study of botany and taught him much on the subject. Barton occasionally took Baldwin and other students on botanical excursions into the countryside. In particular Barton's classes studied at the botanic collections at Bartram's Garden under William Bartram and at William Hamilton's garden The Woodlands in Philadelphia.

While Baldwin was attending the university, one of his friends and fellow students, William Darlington developed a serious illness. Baldwin devoted much time and effort to assisting his recovery. Thus began a close and lifelong friendship. After one course at the University of Pennsylvania, Baldwin again fell short financially, and in 1803 returned to Dr. Todd to work as his assistant.

In 1805, he secured a position as a surgeon on a ship, and sailed to Antwerp, then to Guangzhou, and returned to Philadelphia in 1806. During this voyage, he earned enough money to complete his studies. He returned to the University of Pennsylvania and was awarded the degree of M.D. in April 1807.

== Delaware ==
Before the end of 1807, he had moved to Wilmington, Delaware and married Hannah Webster, a young lady who had far more education than most women of her time. They would eventually have four daughters.

Baldwin and his wife considered themselves to be devout Quakers, but they were thrown out of meeting for getting married by a Presbyterian minister whom the Quakers called a mere "hireling". Baldwin apologized for this and was reinstated.

During his time in Wilmington, he lived by the practice of medicine and spent his leisure hours in botany. In January 1811, he received a letter from Henry Muhlenberg which began as follows:

Lancaster, [Penn'a] January 7, 1811
Sir: Will you forgive me, if I, as a stranger, intrude upon your studies, and beg your acquaintance? Doctor Hiester, the present physician of the Lazaretto, informs me that you are a great friend of Botany...

Thus began an enduring friendship and a correspondence that eventually consisted of 90 letters, continuing to the death of Muhlenberg in 1815.

== Georgia ==
In Wilmington, Baldwin's health continued to deteriorate, and in the autumn of 1811, he moved to Georgia to avoid the severity of the northern winters. In January 1812, he visited Stephen Elliott at his plantation in South Carolina. Baldwin sent Elliott many specimens in the following years, and also some descriptions, which Elliott included in his book A Sketch of the Botany of South Carolina and Georgia, giving Baldwin full credit for having written them.

The War of 1812 began on June 18 of that year with the declaration of war by the U.S. Congress, and soon thereafter, Baldwin joined the navy as a surgeon. For this, he was thrown out of meeting for the second time by the Quakers. He protested that he had gone to war "not to make wounds, but to heal them", but his membership was never restored in spite of his determined efforts to regain it.

Baldwin's military service lasted nearly 4½ years, from the summer of 1812 to the autumn of 1816. He spent the first 2½ years of his service at St. Marys, Georgia, a small settlement at the mouth of the St. Marys River. The next two years were spent in Savannah. While he lived in Georgia, he sometimes took long journeys on foot, traveling deep into territory occupied by the Creek Indians. He was well received by the natives, and he, in turn, was deeply sympathetic toward them. In his biographical sketch of Baldwin, Darlington writes:

With a knapsack on his back, he made several journeys on foot, and sometimes entirely alone, far within the territory of the Indians: and such was his gentle, inoffensive demeanor, among these Children of the Forest, that he completely secured their good will, and uniformly experienced from them the kindest and most friendly treatment. His humane disposition predisposed him to a favorable estimate of the Aboriginal character: he sympathised deeply with the wrongs and privations suffered by the native Proprietors of the Wilderness: and the result of his intercourse with them, was a firm conviction that they were a race "more sinned against than sinning."

When Baldwin left the navy near the end of 1816, he sent his family back to Wilmington. In the winter of 1816 to 1817 through the spring of 1817, he continued to live in Georgia, making frequent botanical excursions there and in what would soon become the state of Florida. At that time, many Americans called it East Florida.

He returned to Wilmington in 1817 in spite of concerns about his health. In August of that year, while passing through Philadelphia, he met Zaccheus Collins and they became fast friends.

In 1817, President James Monroe selected Caesar Augustus Rodney, John Graham, and Theodorick Bland, as commissioners for a special diplomatic mission to South America, the South American Commission of 1817-1818. Because of his reputation as a botanist, Baldwin was selected to sail on the frigate USS Congress as a botanical investigator as well as the ship's surgeon. He embarked late in 1817 and returned to Wilmington in July 1818. During its voyage, Congress stopped at the ports of Rio de Janeiro, Montevideo, Buenos Aires, Maldonado, San Salvador, Brazil, and Margarita Island, Venezuela. During these stops, Baldwin found plenty of opportunity to collect plants that he would press and dry for later study.

After Baldwin returned to Wilmington in July 1818, he planned to study the large collection of plants that he had accumulated, and he began to prepare manuscripts for publication. He exchanged letters with Zaccheus Collins and William Darlington on Cyperus, Scirpus, and Rhynchospora, members of the family Cyperaceae that he was preparing a treatment of. He wrote to Darlington that "It will not do to hurry - there has been too much hurrying among our botanists."

But his plans were not to be fulfilled. The U.S. government was preparing an expedition, to be led by Major Stephen Long, to explore the upper reaches of the Missouri River. William Darlington and John Eatton Le Conte recommended Baldwin as the botanist for this mission and urged him to go.

== Missouri ==
Baldwin dropped his work on the grasses Panicum and Paspalum to accept the appointment as botanist on Major Long's expedition. In March 1819, he traveled to Pittsburgh to join other members of the expedition. There were delays in Pittsburgh, and departure did not occur until May 5.

Baldwin believed that travel would sustain his health, but might have had premonitions of his fate. Soon after he started down the Ohio River, He wrote to Darlington:

I shall hold out as long as I can. Whether my remains are deposited on the banks of the Missouri, or among my kindred at home, is now a matter of little consequence.

In another letter to Darlington, he described the condition of the boat.

But this boat, – hastily constructed, and built entirely of unseasoned timber, – is almost daily in want of repairs; and is so leaky and wet, that we have not a dry locker for our clothes.

A stop was made in Cincinnati for a whole week, partly for repairs, and partly because of the alarming condition of Dr. Baldwin. The expedition reached Franklin, Missouri, a small town across the river from Boonville in mid-July where Baldwin resigned from the expedition to convalesce in the home of John J. Lowry.

The following October, William Darlington received a letter from John J. Lowry, which began as follows:

Franklin, Howard County, M. T. Sept. 15, 1819.
Sir: It is my painful duty to inform you of your friend Wm. Baldwin, M.D. who died on the first inst. [i.e. instante mente, of this month] at my house. He was not able to proceed on the exploring expedition, and remained here till he died.

William Baldwin was among the first of about 100 members of Major Long's expedition to die of disease and deprivation. When word of this reached the U.S. Congress, they immediately declared the expedition a failure and terminated its funding. Thus ended the ill-fated venture which claimed the life of one of America's greatest botanists.

Baldwin was 40 years and 5 months of age at the time of his death. He was buried on the banks of the Missouri River. At the end of his biographical sketch of Baldwin, Darlington, in 1843, wrote:

His gentle spirit forsook its frail tenement, in a region far remote from his anxious family, - and the wildflowers of the West, for more than twenty years, have been blooming on his lonely grave: But the recollection of his virtues continues to be fondly cherished by every surviving friend, - and his ardor in the pursuit of his favorite Science will render his memory forever dear to the true lovers of American Botany.

In January 1844, Lowry wrote to Darlington to tell him that the grave of his friend had been washed away by the floodwaters of the Missouri.

== Papers ==
Many of Baldwin's personal papers have been preserved. Some of these are in the Mertz Library at the New York Botanical Garden. Others are in the Asa Gray Archive at the Harvard University Herbarium.

Baldwin's first scientific paper was on two new species of Rottboellia that he had found on the coast of Georgia. It was published in the year of his death. His only other paper was read before a meeting of the American Philosophical Society on April 16, 1819 as he made his way down the Ohio River, but it was not published until 1825. Its subject was two species of Cyperus from Georgia and four Species of Kyllinga from South America.

== Collections ==
One of the concerns of botany in the early 21st century is the location of type specimens, the material that formed the basis of the description that was given when the plant was named. The whereabouts of this material is sometimes discovered unexpectedly. For example, a set of 18 specimens that Baldwin gave to the American Philosophical Society in March 1819 was neglected, probably because of its small size, and was not studied until 1978. At that time, it was found to contain the type specimens of some species of Rhynchospora.

William Baldwin donated generously to the collections of others, often exchanging some of his plants for plants that he desired. He contributed much to the herbaria if Muhlenberg, Elliott, Collins, and Darlington. He also sent specimens to Aylmer Bourke Lambert and Aime Bonpland, and in 1817, he sent some to James Edward Smith. Smith published several new species based on material that Baldwin had sent him. In 1811, he sent moss and lichen specimens to Olof Swartz and Erik Acharius. In 1815, he sent more of the same to Christian Friedrich Schwägrichen.

Upon Baldwin's death, his widow wanted to give his herbarium to William Darlington, but Darlington would not accept it because he thought that she should sell it, and he was unable to pay her what it was worth. Zaccheus Collins bought Baldwin's herbarium, but made no scientific use of it. Collins was a Philadelphia merchant who knew as much botany as anyone, but to the exasperation of botanists of his time, chose to create one of the best herbaria in the United States, but published nothing. Collins died without a will in 1831. He had kept the Baldwin herbarium separate from the rest of his collection. The executor of his estate, his son-in-law, sold the Baldwin herbarium to Lewis von Schweinitz for $105 in 1833. Schweinitz already had a herbarium holding 20,000 species, and the addition of the Baldwin herbarium gave Schwienitz 3000 species that he did not already have. At this time, he wrote to John Torrey, offering him duplicates from the Baldwin herbarium of plants that he already had.

Schweinitz died in 1834, before he could fully mine the riches of the Baldwin herbarium. John Torrey used letters that he had received from Schweinitz to obtain from Schweinitz's widow a part of the Baldwin herbarium which he shared with Asa Gray. The rest of the Baldwin herbarium then went to its present location at the Academy of Natural Sciences of Philadelphia.

The plants that Baldwin had given to Collins' main collection were given with that collection to Constantine Samuel Rafinesque in the spring of 1837 in payment of a debt owed to Rafinesque by the Collins estate. Rafinesque died in 1840 and his herbarium was acquired the following year by Elias Durand, the curator of the herbarium of the Academy of Natural Sciences of Philadelphia. Durand, a citizen of France, discarded much of the Rafinesque herbarium and sent the remainder to Paris where it remains today as the Herbier Durand in the Herbier National de Paris at the Museum National d'Histoire Naturelle.

Those plants that Baldwin gave to Darlington are now in the Darlington Herbarium at West Chester University. Those that he gave to James Edward Smith are in the Smithian Herbarium at Kew Gardens, London. Other plants attributed to Baldwin are at the University of Manchester Herbarium and at the herbarium of the Los Angeles County Arboretum and Botanic Garden.

The historian Ronald L. Stuckey has found that Thomas Nuttall, Stephen Elliott, Asa Gray, John Torrey, and Constantine Rafinesque together published at least 109 new species based on material provided by William Baldwin. Twelve of these descriptions were actually written by Baldwin, and published by Stephen Elliott in Sketch of the Botany of South Carolina and Georgia. Muhlenberg did not record where his specimens came from, but it is known that Baldwin sent him many. James Edward Smith also described new species from material sent by Baldwin.

== Honors ==
There were plants named after William Baldwin. Thomas Nuttall named the genus Balduina for him in 1818, deriving the name from a latinization of "Baldwin". At the bottom of the page where Balduina is described:

Dedicated as a just tribute of respect for the talents and industry of William Baldwyn [sic], M.D., late of [i.e. formerly residing in] Savannah, in Georgia: a gentleman whose botanical zeal and knowledge has rarely been excelled in America.

John Torrey and Asa Gray changed Balduina to Baldwinia in 1840, but this orthographical variant was not generally accepted. Balduina is now a conserved name.

Balduina is a genus of three species native to the Atlantic and Gulf coastal plain. Not all authors have put them in one genus and they have had various names, but a revision of Asteraceae in 2007 placed all three of these species together in Balduina.

Several species of plants have been named for William Baldwin. Among those names that are still in use are the following names: Eleocharis baldwinii (John Torrey) Alvan Wentworth Chapman, Rhynchospora baldwinii Asa Gray, Saccharum baldwinii Curt Sprengel, Clematis baldwinii John Torrey and Asa Gray, Paronychia baldwinii (Torrey and Gray) Eduard Fenzl and Wilhelm Walpers, Eryngium baldwinii Curt Sprengel, Vernonia baldwinii John Torrey, Xyris baldwiniana Josef Schultes, and Matelea baldwyniana (Robert Sweet) Robert Woodson.

At least six other plants, including Fimbristylis annua, Dichanthelium ensifolium, Ptelea trifoliata, Silene catesbaei, Symphyotrichum undulatum, and Viguiera (Rhysolepis) anchusifolia have had names that honored Baldwin, but these are no longer in use.
