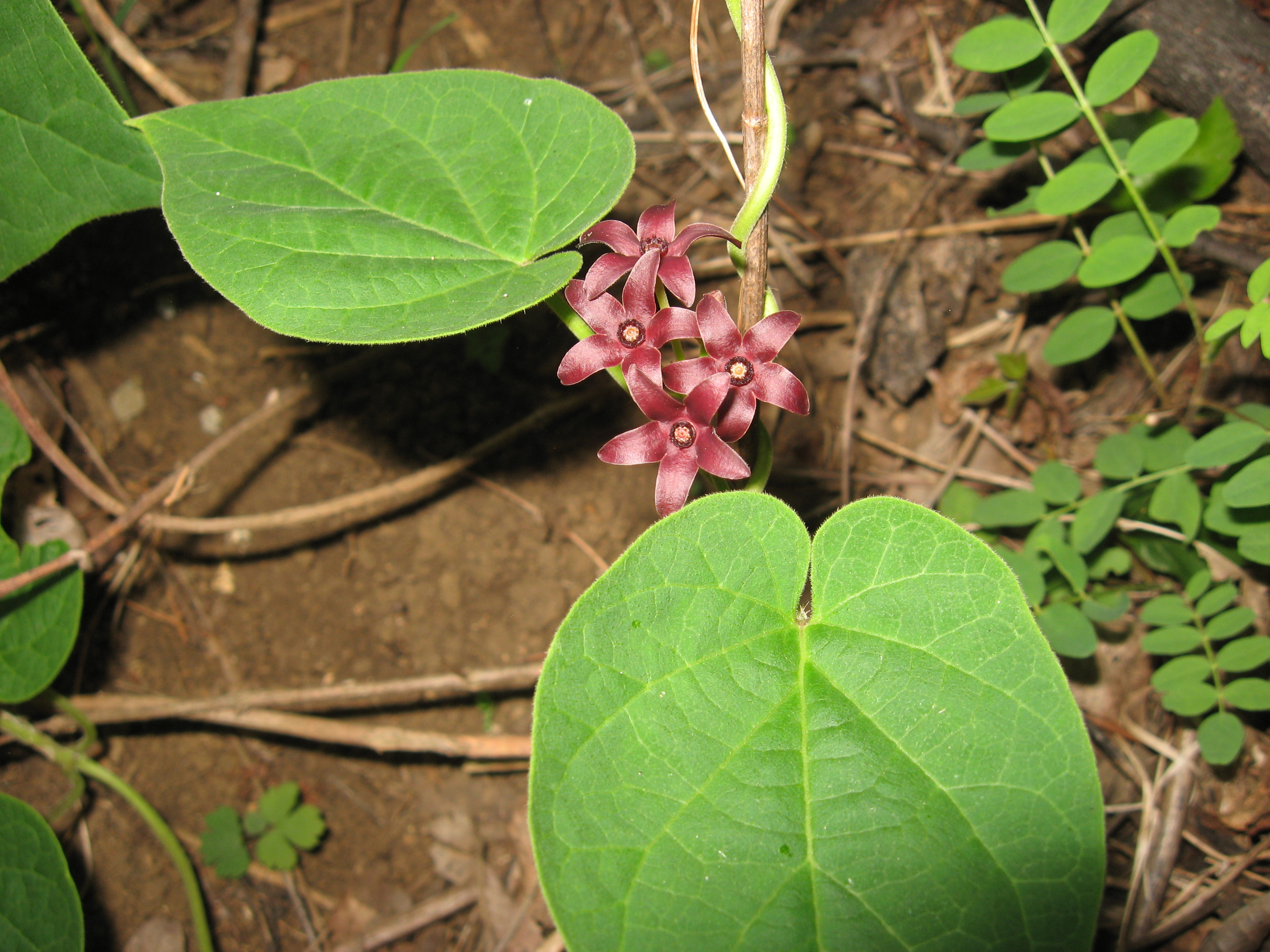

Conservation status
- Apparently Secure (NatureServe)

Scientific classification
- Kingdom: Plantae
- Clade: Tracheophytes
- Clade: Angiosperms
- Clade: Eudicots
- Clade: Asterids
- Order: Gentianales
- Family: Apocynaceae
- Genus: Matelea
- Species: M. carolinensis

Binomial name
- Matelea carolinensis (Jacq.) Woodson

= Matelea carolinensis =

Species of plant

Matelea carolinensis is a species of flowering plant in the family Apocynaceae known by the common names maroon Carolina milkvine and Carolina anglepod. It is native to the southeastern United States, where it grows in open deciduous woods and stream banks. It is a perennial twining vine forb/herb with milky sap and 5 to 10 cm heart-shaped leaves. The vine dies back and returns every year. The 1 to 2 cm flowers are deep purple, occasionally yellow. The fruit is a follicle.
