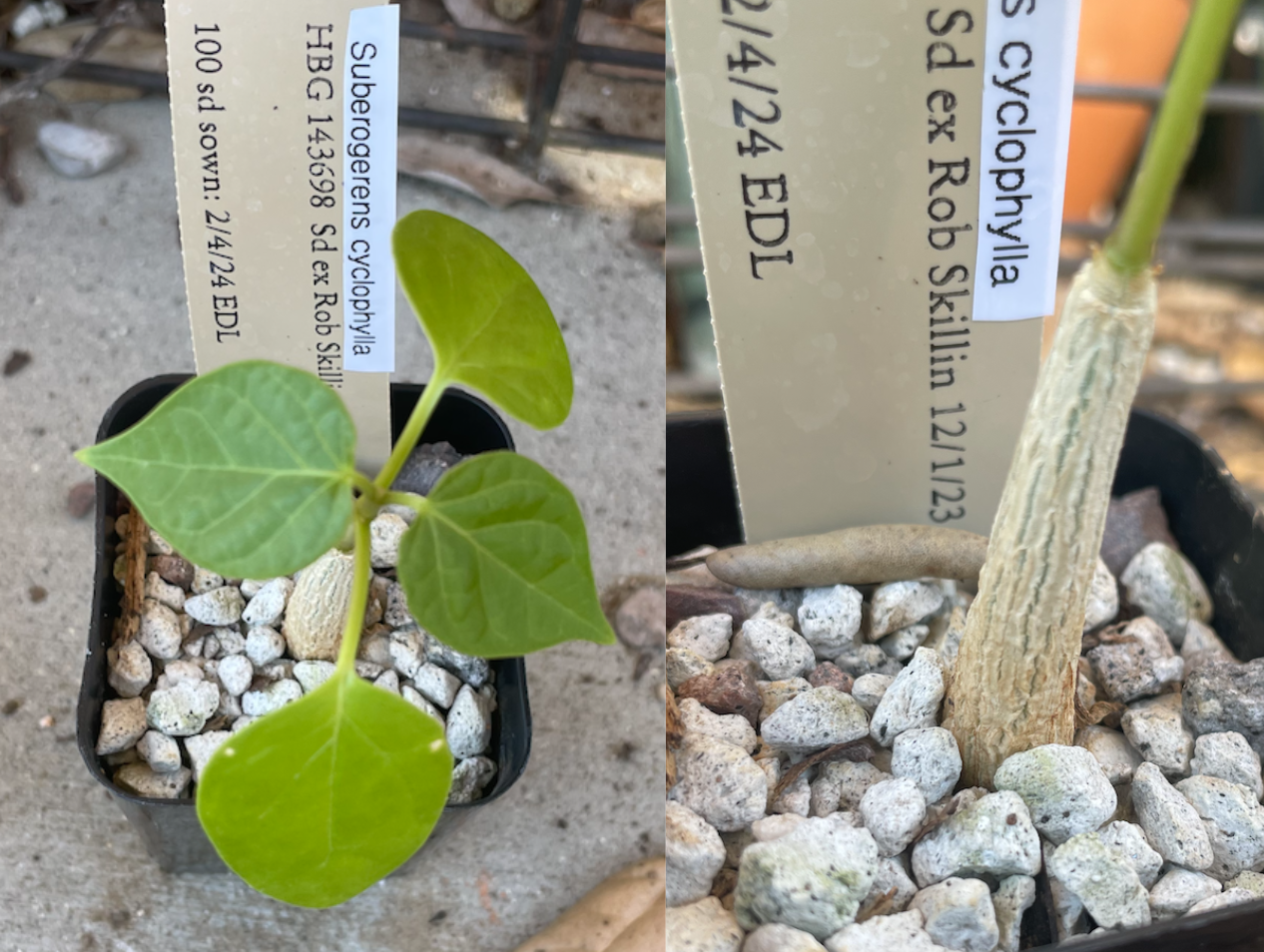

Scientific classification
- Kingdom: Plantae
- Clade: Tracheophytes
- Clade: Angiosperms
- Clade: Eudicots
- Clade: Asterids
- Order: Gentianales
- Family: Apocynaceae
- Subfamily: Asclepiadoideae
- Tribe: Asclepiadeae
- Subtribe: Gonolobinae
- Genus: Suberogerens; Morillo (2015)
- Species: S. cyclophylla

Binomial name
- Suberogerens cyclophylla (Standl.) Morillo (2015)

Synonyms
- Matelea cyclophylla (Standl.) Woodson (1941); Vincetoxicum cyclophyllum Standl. (1924)

= Suberogerens =

Genus of flowering plants

Suberogerens cyclophylla is a species of flowering plant in the dogbane family, Apocynaceae. It is the sole species in genus Suberogerens. It is a climbing tuberous geophyte endemic to Mexico, ranging from northwestern to southern Mexico including Veracruz.

The species was first described by Paul Carpenter Standley as Vincetoxicum cyclophyllum in 1924. In 2015 Gilberto N. Morillo renamed it Suberogerens cyclophylla, placing it in its own monotypic genus.
