= Riparoampelos =

Scientific classification
- Kingdom: Plantae
- Clade: Tracheophytes
- Clade: Angiosperms
- Clade: Eudicots
- Clade: Asterids
- Order: Gentianales
- Family: Apocynaceae
- Tribe: Asclepiadeae
- Subtribe: Gonolobinae
- Genus: Riparoampelos; Morillo (2015)
- Species: R. amazonicus

Binomial name
- Riparoampelos amazonicus (Morillo) Morillo (2015)

Synonyms
- Matelea amazonica Morillo (1977)

Genus of flowering plants

Riparoampelos amazonicus is a species of flowering plant in the dogbane family, Apocynaceae. It is the sole species in genus Riparoampelos. It is a climber native the Amazon rainforest of southeastern Colombia, Amazonas state of southern Venezuela, eastern Peru, and northwestern Brazil.

The species was first described as Matelea amazonica by Gilberto N. Morillo in 1977. In 2015 Morillo renamed it Riparoampelos amazonicus, placing it in its own monotypic genus.
