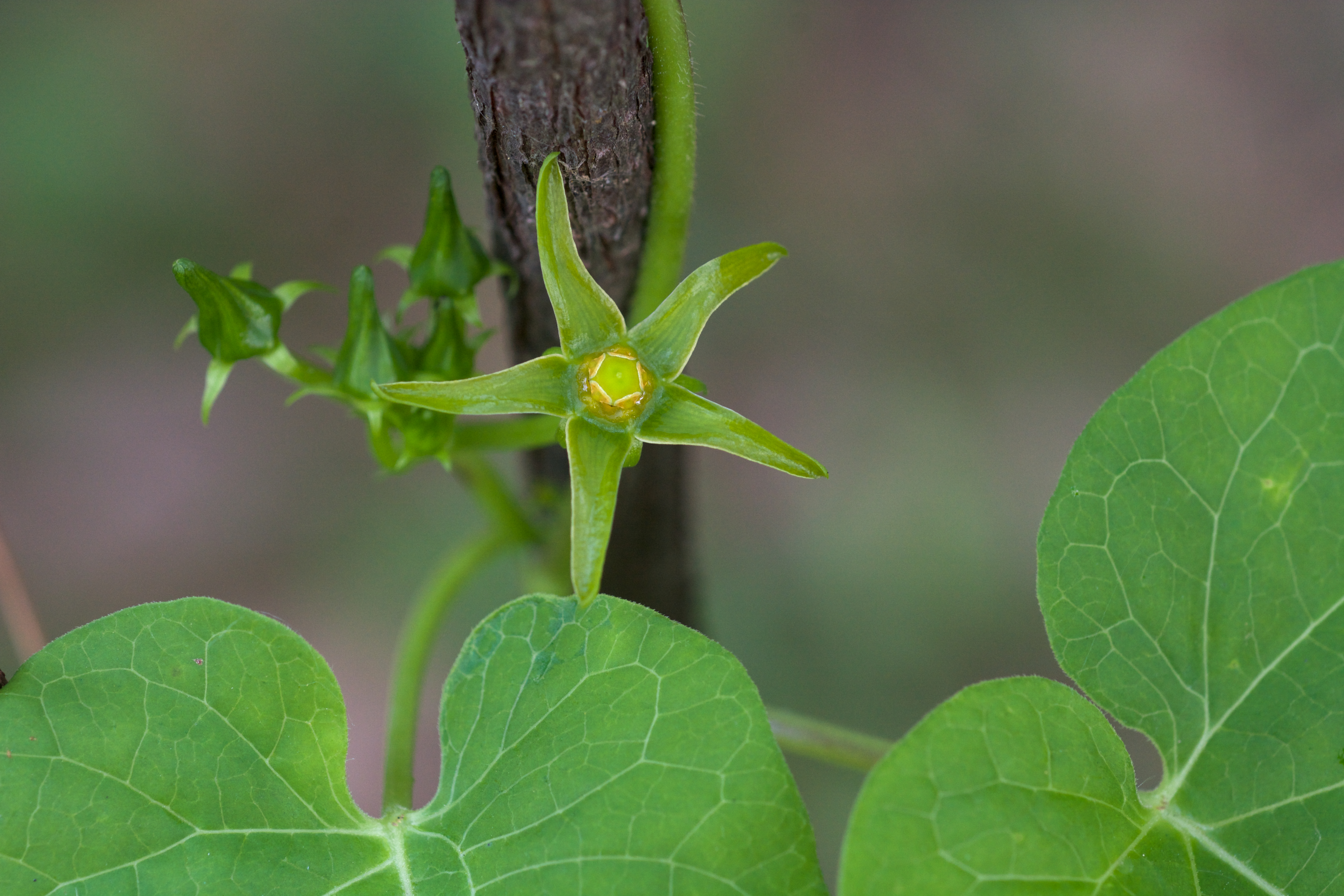

Scientific classification
- Kingdom: Plantae
- Clade: Tracheophytes
- Clade: Angiosperms
- Clade: Eudicots
- Clade: Asterids
- Order: Gentianales
- Family: Apocynaceae
- Genus: Gonolobus
- Species: G. suberosus

Binomial name
- Gonolobus suberosus (L.) R. Br. 1811

= Gonolobus suberosus =

Species of plant

Gonolobus suberosus is a species of plant in the family Apocynaceae. It is native to eastern North America, where it is primarily found in the southeastern United States. Its natural habitat is mesic to wet forests and thickets.

Two varieties have been described. These are:

- Gonolobus suberosus var. granulatus - West of the Appalachian Mountains
- Gonolobus suberosus var. suberosus - Primarily of the Appalachian Mountains and eastward

== Gallery ==
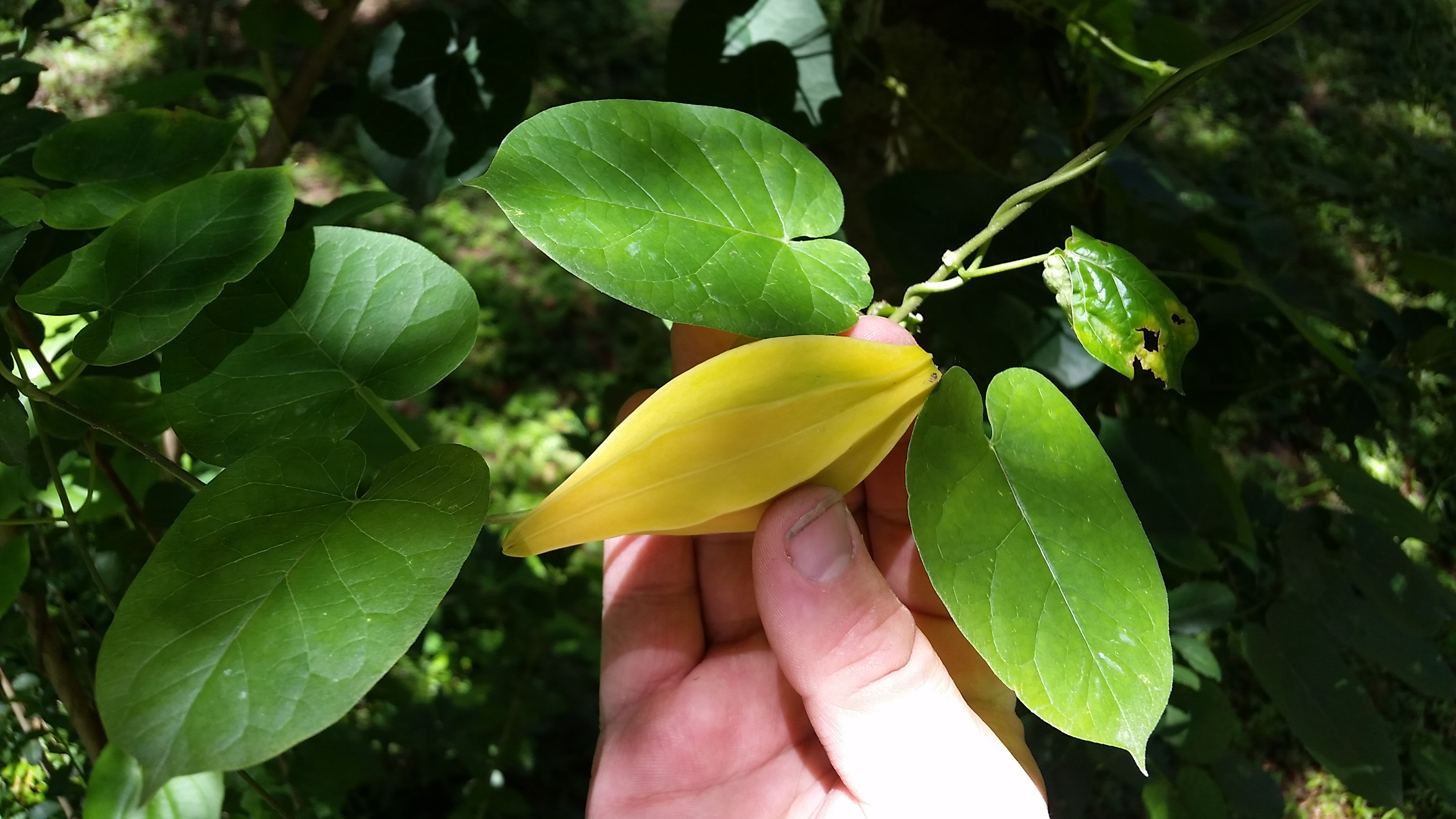
Fruit of Gonolobus suberosus
