= Gonolobus fimbriatiflorus =

Scientific classification
- Kingdom: Plantae
- Clade: Tracheophytes
- Clade: Angiosperms
- Clade: Eudicots
- Clade: Asterids
- Order: Gentianales
- Family: Apocynaceae
- Genus: Gonolobus
- Species: G. fimbriatiflorus

Binomial name
- Gonolobus fimbriatiflorus (Morillo) W.D.Stevens

Synonyms
- Matelea fimbriatiflora Morillo

Species of plant

Gonolobus fimbriatiflorus, synonym Matelea fimbriatiflora, is a species of plant in the family Apocynaceae. It is native to Costa Rica, Nicaragua and Panama in Central America, and Ecuador.

== Conservation ==
Matelea fimbriatiflora was assessed as "Endangered" in the 2003 IUCN Red List, in which it is said to be native only to Ecuador, where its natural habitat is subtropical or tropical moist lowland forests that are threatened by habitat loss. As of November 2023, M. fimbriatiflora was regarded as a synonym of Gonolobus fimbriatiflorus, which has a wider distribution that includes part of Central America.
