= Gilberto Morillo =

Venezuelan botanist (born 1944)

Gilberto N. Morillo
- Born: 1944 (age 81–82); Venezuela
- Scientific career
- Fields: Botany

Gilberto N. Morillo (born 1944) is a Venezuelan scientist, author, and educator. He was known for botany. In 1995 he was chosen as an elected curator of Herbario Forestal (MER) of the University of the Andes in Mérida, Venezuela. Morillo had already been a curator of the Faculty of Pharmacy (MERF) from the same university and the National Herbarium of Venezuela in Caracas. He is a collector of Angiopspermaes, whose specimens are in the National Herbarium of Venezuela. He is currently a researcher with the highest number of scientific publications of the Faculty of Forestry and Environmental and global specialist in Asclepiadaceae and a consultant for prestigious journals in the field of botany. Species named after Morillo including Prestonia morilloi (Apocynaceae), Cynanchum morilloi, Macroditassa morilloana, Oxypetalum morilloanum, Lessingianthus morilloi, Acianthera morilloi and Piper morilloi.

As of October 2023 Morillo has published 514 names of plant taxa, include the genera Atrostemma, Bruceholstia, Chloropetalum, Graciemoriana, Metoxypetalum, Orinoquia, Pruskortizia, Pseudolachnostoma, Rhytidostemma, Riparoampelos, Rotundanthus, Suberogerens, and Vulcanoa, and hundreds of species including Orinoquia yanomamica.

== Publications ==
=== Books ===
- Morillo, Gilberto, Briceño, Benito, Silva F., Juan. 2000. Distribución de las Asteraceae de los páramos venezolanos. Acta Bot. Venez. 23 (1): 47-68
- Morillo, Gilberto, Briceño, Benito, F Silva, Juan. 2010. Botánica y ecología de las Monocotiledóneas de los Páramos en Venezuela. Volumen 1. Editor Instituto de Ciencias Ambientales y Ecológicas, Universidad de Los Andes, Facultad de Ciencias. p 296. ISBN 980-11-1363-4
- Morillo, Gilberto, Briceño Benito. 2006. Catálogo de las plantas con flores de los Páramos de Venezuela: Parte U. Monocotiledóneas (Liliopsida). Acta Bot Venez. 29 (1): 89-134.
- Morillo, Gilberto. 1987. Flora del Parque Nacional Henri Pittier. Editor N. Martinez. 39 pp
