= Orinoquia yanomamica =

Scientific classification
- Kingdom: Plantae
- Clade: Tracheophytes
- Clade: Angiosperms
- Clade: Eudicots
- Clade: Asterids
- Order: Gentianales
- Family: Apocynaceae
- Genus: Orinoquia; Morillo (2015)
- Species: O. yanomamica

Binomial name
- Orinoquia yanomamica (Morillo) Morillo

Synonyms
- Matelea yanomamica Morillo (1981)

Species of flowering plant

Orinoquia yanomamica is a species of flowering plant in the dogbane family, Apocynaceae. It is a climber endemic to Amazonas state of southern Venezuela. It is the sole species in genus Orinoquia. The species was first named Matelea yanomamica by Gilberto Morillo in 1981. In 2015 Morillo moved the species to its own genus.
