= List of Apocynaceae of South Africa =

List of flowering plants in the family Apocynaceae recorded from South Africa

Apocynaceae (from Apocynum, Greek for "dog-away") is a family of flowering plants in the order Gentianales that includes trees, shrubs, herbs, stem succulents, and vines, commonly known as the dogbane family, because some taxa were used as dog poison. Members of the family are native to the European, Asian, African, Australian, and American tropics or subtropics, with some temperate members. The former family Asclepiadaceae (now known as Asclepiadoideae) is considered a subfamily of Apocynaceae and contains 348 genera. A list of Apocynaceae genera may be found here.

23,420 species of vascular plant have been recorded in South Africa, making it the sixth most species-rich country in the world and the most species-rich country on the African continent. Of these, 153 species are considered to be threatened. Nine biomes have been described in South Africa: Fynbos, Succulent Karoo, desert, Nama Karoo, grassland, savanna, Albany thickets, the Indian Ocean coastal belt, and forests.

The 2018 South African National Biodiversity Institute's National Biodiversity Assessment plant checklist lists 35,130 taxa in the phyla Anthocerotophyta (hornworts (6)), Anthophyta (flowering plants (33534)), Bryophyta (mosses (685)), Cycadophyta (cycads (42)), Lycopodiophyta (Lycophytes(45)), Marchantiophyta (liverworts (376)), Pinophyta (conifers (33)), and Pteridophyta (cryptogams (408)).

111 genera are represented in the literature. Listed taxa include species, subspecies, varieties, and forms as recorded, some of which have subsequently been allocated to other taxa as synonyms, in which cases the accepted taxon is appended to the listing. Multiple entries under alternative names reflect taxonomic revision over time.

== Acokanthera ==
Genus Acokanthera:

- Acokanthera oblongifolia (Hochst.) Codd, indigenous
- Acokanthera oppositifolia (Lam.) Codd, indigenous
- Acokanthera rotundata (Codd) Kupicha, indigenous

== Adenium ==
Genus Adenium:

- Adenium multiflorum Klotzsch, indigenous
- Adenium oleifolium Stapf, indigenous
- Adenium swazicum Stapf, indigenous

== Ancylobothrys ==
Genus Ancylobothrys:

- Ancylobothrys capensis (Oliv.) Pichon, indigenous
- Ancylobothrys petersiana (Klotzsch) Pierre, indigenous

== Anisotoma ==
Genus Anisotoma:

- Anisotoma cordifolia Fenzl, endemic
- Anisotoma pedunculata N.E.Br. indigenous

== Araujia ==
Genus Araujia:

- Araujia sericifera Brot. not indigenous, naturalised, invasive

== Arduina ==
Genus Arduina:

- Arduina acuminata E.Mey. accepted as Carissa bispinosa (L.) Desf. ex Brenan, indigenous
- Arduina bispinosa L. accepted as Carissa bispinosa (L.) Desf. ex Brenan, indigenous
- Arduina edulis (Vahl) Spreng. accepted as Carissa spinarum L. indigenous
- Arduina erythrocarpa Eckl. accepted as Carissa bispinosa (L.) Desf. ex Brenan, indigenous
- Arduina ferox E.Mey. accepted as Carissa bispinosa (L.) Desf. ex Brenan, indigenous
- Arduina grandiflora E.Mey. accepted as Carissa macrocarpa (Eckl.) A.DC. indigenous
- Arduina haematocarpa Eckl. accepted as Carissa bispinosa (L.) Desf. ex Brenan, indigenous
- Arduina macrocarpa Eckl. accepted as Carissa macrocarpa (Eckl.) A.DC. indigenous
- Arduina megaphylla Gand. accepted as Carissa bispinosa (L.) Desf. ex Brenan, indigenous
- Arduina tetramera Sacleux, accepted as Carissa tetramera (Sacleux) Stapf, indigenous

== Asclepias ==
Genus Asclepias:

- Asclepias adscendens (Schltr.) Schltr. indigenous
- Asclepias affinis (Schltr.) Schltr. accepted as Asclepias albens (E.Mey.) Schltr. present
- Asclepias albens (E.Mey.) Schltr. indigenous
- Asclepias aurea (Schltr.) Schltr. indigenous
- Asclepias bicuspis N.E.Br. endemic
- Asclepias brevicuspis (E.Mey.) Schltr. endemic
- Asclepias brevipes (Schltr.) Schltr. endemic
- Asclepias buchenaviana Schinz, accepted as Gomphocarpus filiformis (E.Mey.) D.Dietr. present
- Asclepias burchellii Schltr. accepted as Gomphocarpus tomentosus Burch. subsp. tomentosus, present
- Asclepias cancellata Burm.f. accepted as Gomphocarpus cancellatus (Burm.f.) Bruyns, present
- Asclepias cognata N.E.Br. accepted as Aspidonepsis cognata (N.E.Br.) Nicholas & Goyder, indigenous
- Asclepias compressidens (N.E.Br.) Nicholas, endemic
- Asclepias concinna (Schltr.) Schltr. endemic
- Asclepias cooperi N.E.Br. endemic
- Asclepias crassinervis N.E.Br. indigenous
- Asclepias crinita (G.Bertol.) N.E.Br. accepted as Gomphocarpus fruticosus (L.) Aiton f. subsp. fruticosus
- Asclepias crispa P.J.Bergius, indigenous
  - Asclepias crispa P.J.Bergius var. crispa, endemic
  - Asclepias crispa P.J.Bergius var. plana N.E.Br. endemic
  - Asclepias crispa P.J.Bergius var. pseudocrispa N.E.Br. endemic
- Asclepias cucullata (Schltr.) Schltr. indigenous
  - Asclepias cucullata (Schltr.) Schltr. subsp. cucullata, indigenous
- Asclepias cultriformis (Harv. ex Schltr.) Schltr. indigenous
- Asclepias curassavica L. not indigenous, naturalised
- Asclepias decipiens N.E.Br. accepted as Gomphocarpus fruticosus (L.) Aiton f. subsp. decipiens (N.E.Br.) Goyder & Nicholas, present
- Asclepias densiflora N.E.Br. indigenous
- Asclepias depressa (Schltr.) Schltr. accepted as Asclepias multicaulis (E.Mey.) Schltr. present
- Asclepias diploglossa (Turcz.) Druce, accepted as Aspidonepsis diploglossa (Turcz.) Nicholas & Goyder, indigenous
- Asclepias disparilis N.E.Br. endemic
- Asclepias dissona N.E.Br. endemic
  - Asclepias dregeana Schltr. var. calceolus (S.Moore) N.E.Br. accepted as Asclepias fulva N.E.Br. indigenous
  - Asclepias dregeana Schltr. var. sordida N.E.Br. accepted as Asclepias fulva N.E.Br. present
- Asclepias eminens (Harv.) Schltr. indigenous
- Asclepias expansa (E.Mey.) Schltr. endemic
- Asclepias fallax (Schltr.) Schltr. endemic
- Asclepias filiformis (E.Mey.) Benth. & Hook. ex Kuntze, accepted as Gomphocarpus filiformis (E.Mey.) D.Dietr. indigenous
- Asclepias flava N.E.Br. accepted as Aspidonepsis flava (N.E.Br.) Nicholas & Goyder, indigenous
- Asclepias flexuosa (E.Mey.) Schltr. endemic
- Asclepias fruticosa L. accepted as Gomphocarpus fruticosus (L.) Aiton f. subsp. fruticosus, present
- Asclepias fulva N.E.Br. indigenous
- Asclepias gibba (E.Mey.) Schltr. indigenous
  - Asclepias gibba (E.Mey.) Schltr. var. gibba, indigenous
  - Asclepias gibba (E.Mey.) Schltr. var. media N.E.Br. indigenous
- Asclepias glaucophylla (Schltr.) Schltr. accepted as Gomphocarpus glaucophyllus Schltr. present
- Asclepias gordon-grayae Nicholas, endemic
- Asclepias hastata (E.Mey.) Schltr. endemic
- Asclepias humilis (E.Mey.) Schltr. indigenous
- Asclepias macropus (Schltr.) Schltr. endemic
- Asclepias meliodora (Schltr.) Schltr. indigenous
  - Asclepias meliodora (Schltr.) Schltr. var. brevicoronata N.E.Br. accepted as Asclepias meliodora (Schltr.) Schltr. present
- Asclepias meyeriana (Schltr.) Schltr. indigenous
- Asclepias montevaga M.Glen, Nicholas & Bester, indigenous
- Asclepias monticola N.E.Br. endemic
- Asclepias multicaulis (E.Mey.) Schltr. indigenous
- Asclepias multiflora (Decne.) N.E.Br. endemic
- Asclepias nana I.Verd. endemic
- Asclepias navicularis (E.Mey.) Schltr. endemic
- Asclepias oreophila Nicholas, indigenous
- Asclepias patens N.E.Br. endemic
- Asclepias peltigera (E.Mey.) Schltr. endemic
- Asclepias physocarpa (E.Mey.) Schltr. accepted as Gomphocarpus physocarpus E.Mey. present
- Asclepias praemorsa Schltr. endemic
- Asclepias pulchella (Decne.) N.E.Br. accepted as Asclepias ameliae S.Moore, present
- Asclepias rara N.E.Br. endemic
- Asclepias reenensis N.E.Br. accepted as Aspidonepsis reenensis (N.E.Br.) Nicholas & Goyder, indigenous
- Asclepias rivularis (Schltr.) Schltr. accepted as Gomphocarpus rivularis Schltr. present
- Asclepias rostrata N.E.Br. accepted as Gomphocarpus fruticosus (L.) Aiton f. subsp. rostratus (N.E.Br.) Goyder & Nicholas
- Asclepias sabulosa Schltr. accepted as Asclepias crispa P.J.Bergius var. crispa, present
- Asclepias schizoglossoides Schltr. accepted as Aspidonepsis diploglossa (Turcz.) Nicholas & Goyder, indigenous
- Asclepias schlechteri (K.Schum.) N.E.Br. indigenous
- Asclepias schweinfurthii N.E.Br. accepted as Pachycarpus lineolatus (Decne.) Bullock
- Asclepias stellifera Schltr. indigenous
- Asclepias ulophylla Schltr. endemic
- Asclepias velutina (Schltr.) Schltr. endemic
- Asclepias vicaria N.E.Br. endemic
- Asclepias viridiflora (E.Mey.) Goyder, accepted as Asclepias fulva N.E.Br. present
- Asclepias woodii (Schltr.) Schltr. endemic
- Asclepias xysmalobioides Hilliard & B.L.Burtt, accepted as Asclepias montevaga M.Glen, Nicholas & Bester, indigenous

== Aspidoglossum ==
Genus Aspidoglossum:

- Aspidoglossum albocoronatum Bester & Nicholas, endemic
- Aspidoglossum araneiferum (Schltr.) Kupicha, indigenous
- Aspidoglossum biflorum E.Mey. indigenous
- Aspidoglossum carinatum (Schltr.) Kupicha, indigenous
- Aspidoglossum delagoense (Schltr.) Kupicha, indigenous
- Aspidoglossum demissum Kupicha, endemic
- Aspidoglossum difficile Hilliard, endemic
- Aspidoglossum dissimile (N.E.Br.) Kupicha, endemic
- Aspidoglossum fasciculare E.Mey. indigenous
- Aspidoglossum flanaganii (Schltr.) Kupicha, endemic
- Aspidoglossum glabrescens (Schltr.) Kupicha, endemic
- Aspidoglossum glanduliferum (Schltr.) Kupicha, endemic
- Aspidoglossum gracile (E.Mey.) Kupicha, endemic
- Aspidoglossum grandiflorum (Schltr.) Kupicha, endemic
- Aspidoglossum heterophyllum E.Mey. endemic
- Aspidoglossum interruptum (E.Mey.) Bullock, indigenous
- Aspidoglossum lamellatum (Schltr.) Kupicha, indigenous
- Aspidoglossum ovalifolium (Schltr.) Kupicha, indigenous
- Aspidoglossum restioides (Schltr.) Kupicha, endemic
- Aspidoglossum uncinatum (N.E.Br.) Kupicha, endemic
- Aspidoglossum validum Kupicha, indigenous
- Aspidoglossum virgatum (E.Mey.) Kupicha, endemic
- Aspidoglossum woodii (Schltr.) Kupicha, endemic
- Aspidoglossum xanthosphaerum Hilliard, endemic

== Aspidonepsis ==
Genus Aspidonepsis:

- Aspidonepsis cognata (N.E.Br.) Nicholas & Goyder, endemic
- Aspidonepsis diploglossa (Turcz.) Nicholas & Goyder, indigenous
- Aspidonepsis flava (N.E.Br.) Nicholas & Goyder, endemic
- Aspidonepsis reenensis (N.E.Br.) Nicholas & Goyder, indigenous
- Aspidonepsis shebae Nicholas & Goyder, endemic

== Astephanus ==
Genus Astephanus:

- Astephanus marginatus Decne. accepted as Astephanus zeyheri Turcz. present
- Astephanus triflorus (L.f.) Schult. endemic
- Astephanus zeyheri Turcz. endemic

== Australluma ==
Genus Australluma:

- Australluma ubomboensis (I.Verd.) Bruyns, indigenous

== Brachystelma ==
Genus Brachystelma:

- Brachystelma afrum (Schltr.) N.E.Br. endemic
- Brachystelma angustum Peckover, endemic
- Brachystelma arnotii Baker, indigenous
- Brachystelma australe R.A.Dyer, endemic
- Brachystelma barberae Harv. ex Hook.f. indigenous
- Brachystelma brevipedicellatum Turrill, endemic
  - Brachystelma bruceae]] R.A.Dyer, indigenous
  - Brachystelma bruceae R.A.Dyer subsp. bruceae, endemic
  - Brachystelma bruceae R.A.Dyer subsp. hirsutum R.A.Dyer, endemic
- Brachystelma burchellii (Decne.) Peckover, indigenous
  - Brachystelma burchellii (Decne.) Peckover var. burchellii, indigenous
  - Brachystelma burchellii (Decne.) Peckover var. grandiflorum (N.E.Br.) Meve, indigenous
- Brachystelma campanulatum N.E.Br. endemic
- Brachystelma canum R.A.Dyer, endemic
- Brachystelma cathcartense R.A.Dyer, endemic
- Brachystelma chloranthum (Schltr.) Peckover, indigenous
- Brachystelma chlorozonum E.A.Bruce, endemic
- Brachystelma christianeae Peckover, endemic
- Brachystelma circinatum E.Mey. indigenous
- Brachystelma coddii R.A.Dyer, indigenous
- Brachystelma comptum N.E.Br. endemic
- Brachystelma cummingii A.P.Dold, indigenous
- Brachystelma cupulatum R.A.Dyer, indigenous
- Brachystelma decipiens N.E.Br. endemic
- Brachystelma delicatum R.A.Dyer, endemic
- Brachystelma dimorphum R.A.Dyer, indigenous
  - Brachystelma dimorphum R.A.Dyer subsp. dimorphum, endemic
  - Brachystelma dimorphum R.A.Dyer subsp. gratum R.A.Dyer, endemic
- Brachystelma discoideum R.A.Dyer, indigenous
- Brachystelma duplicatum R.A.Dyer, endemic
- Brachystelma dyeri K.Balkwill & M.Balkwill, endemic
- Brachystelma elongatum (Schltr.) N.E.Br. endemic
- Brachystelma filifolium (N.E.Br.) Peckover, indigenous
- Brachystelma foetidum Schltr. indigenous
- Brachystelma franksiae N.E.Br. indigenous
  - Brachystelma franksiae N.E.Br. subsp. franksiae, endemic
  - Brachystelma franksiae N.E.Br. subsp. grandiflorum A.P.Dold & Bruyns, endemic
- Brachystelma gemmeum R.A.Dyer, endemic
- Brachystelma gerrardii Harv. indigenous
- Brachystelma glenense R.A.Dyer, endemic
- Brachystelma gracile E.A.Bruce, indigenous
- Brachystelma gracillimum R.A.Dyer, endemic
- Brachystelma gymnopodum (Schltr.) Bruyns, indigenous
- Brachystelma hirtellum Weim. indigenous
- Brachystelma huttonii (Harv.) N.E.Br. endemic
- Brachystelma incanum R.A.Dyer, indigenous
- Brachystelma inconspicuum S.Venter, endemic
- Brachystelma kerzneri Peckover, endemic
- Brachystelma longifolium (Schltr.) N.E.Br. endemic
- Brachystelma luteum Peckover, endemic
- Brachystelma macropetalum (Schltr.) N.E.Br. indigenous
- Brachystelma meyerianum Schltr. endemic
- Brachystelma micranthum E.Mey. endemic
- Brachystelma minimum R.A.Dyer, endemic
- Brachystelma minor E.A.Bruce, endemic
- Brachystelma modestum R.A.Dyer, endemic
- Brachystelma molaventi Peckover & A.E.van Wyk, endemic
- Brachystelma montanum R.A.Dyer, endemic
- Brachystelma nanum (Schltr.) N.E.Br. endemic
- Brachystelma natalense (Schltr.) N.E.Br. endemic
- Brachystelma ngomense R.A.Dyer, endemic
- Brachystelma occidentale Schltr. endemic
- Brachystelma oianthum Schltr. endemic
- Brachystelma pachypodium R.A.Dyer, endemic
- Brachystelma parvulum R.A.Dyer, endemic
- Brachystelma perditum R.A.Dyer, indigenous
- Brachystelma petraeum R.A.Dyer, endemic
- Brachystelma pilosum R.A.Dyer, accepted as Brachystelma hirtellum Weim. present
- Brachystelma praelongum S.Moore, indigenous
- Brachystelma pulchellum (Harv.) Schltr. endemic
- Brachystelma pygmaeum (Schltr.) N.E.Br. indigenous
  - Brachystelma pygmaeum (Schltr.) N.E.Br. subsp. flavidum (Schltr.) R.A.Dyer, endemic
  - Brachystelma pygmaeum (Schltr.) N.E.Br. subsp. pygmaeum, endemic
- Brachystelma ramosissimum (Schltr.) N.E.Br. indigenous
- Brachystelma remotum R.A.Dyer, endemic
- Brachystelma rubellum (E.Mey.) Peckover, indigenous
- Brachystelma sandersonii (Oliv.) N.E.Br. endemic
- Brachystelma schizoglossoides (Schltr.) N.E.Br. endemic
- Brachystelma schoenlandianum Schltr. endemic
- Brachystelma setosum Peckover, endemic
- Brachystelma stellatum E.A.Bruce & R.A.Dyer, indigenous
- Brachystelma stenophyllum (Schltr.) R.A.Dyer, indigenous
- Brachystelma swazicum R.A.Dyer, indigenous
- Brachystelma tabularium R.A.Dyer, endemic
- Brachystelma tenellum R.A.Dyer, endemic
- Brachystelma tenue R.A.Dyer, endemic
- Brachystelma theronii Bruyns, indigenous
- Brachystelma thunbergii N.E.Br. endemic
- Brachystelma tuberosum (Meerb.) R.Br. ex Sims, indigenous
- Brachystelma vahrmeijeri R.A.Dyer, endemic
- Brachystelma villosum (Schltr.) N.E.Br. indigenous
- Brachystelma waterbergensis Peckover, endemic

== Callichilia ==
Genus Callichilia:

- Callichilia orientalis S.Moore, indigenous

== Calotropis ==
Genus Calotropis:

- Calotropis busseana K.Schum. accepted as Pachycarpus lineolatus (Decne.) Bullock
- Calotropis procera (Aiton) W.T.Aiton, not indigenous, naturalised, invasive

== Caralluma ==
Genus Caralluma:

- Caralluma arida (Masson) N.E.Br. accepted as Quaqua arida (N.E.Br.) Plowes, present
- Caralluma chlorantha Schltr. endemic
- Caralluma intermedia (N.E.Br.) Schltr. endemic
- Caralluma maughani R.A.Dyer, accepted as Pectinaria maughanii (R.A.Dyer) Bruyns, present
- Caralluma nebrownii A.Berger, accepted as Orbea lutea (N.E.Br.) Bruyns subsp. vaga (N.E.Br.) Bruyns
- Caralluma peschii Nel, accepted as Australluma peschii (Nel) Plowes

== Carandas ==
Genus Carandas:

- Carandas arduina (Lam.) S.Moore, accepted as Carissa bispinosa (L.) Desf. ex Brenan, indigenous
- Carandas edulis (Vahl) Hiern, accepted as Carissa spinarum L. indigenous

== Carissa ==
Genus Carissa:

- Carissa acuminata (E.Mey.) A.DC. accepted as Carissa bispinosa (L.) Desf. ex Brenan, indigenous
- Carissa arduina Lam. accepted as Carissa bispinosa (L.) Desf. ex Brenan, indigenous
- Carissa bispinosa (L.) Desf. ex Brenan, indigenous
  - Carissa bispinosa (L.) Desf. ex Brenan subsp. zambesiensis Kupicha, accepted as Carissa bispinosa (L.) Desf. ex Brenan, indigenous
  - Carissa bispinosa (L.) Desf. ex Brenan var. acuminata (E.Mey.) Codd, accepted as Carissa bispinosa (L.) Desf. ex Brenan, indigenous
- Carissa cordata (Mill.) Fourc. accepted as Carissa bispinosa (L.) Desf. ex Brenan
- Carissa edulis Vahl, accepted as Carissa spinarum L. indigenous
- Carissa edulis Vahl subsp. continentalis Pichon, accepted as Carissa spinarum L. indigenous
- Carissa erythrocarpa (Eckl.) A.DC. accepted as Carissa bispinosa (L.) Desf. ex Brenan, indigenous
- Carissa ferox (E.Mey.) A.DC. accepted as Carissa bispinosa (L.) Desf. ex Brenan, indigenous
- Carissa grandiflora (E.Mey.) A.DC. accepted as Carissa macrocarpa (Eckl.) A.DC. indigenous
- Carissa haematocarpa (Eckl.) A.DC. accepted as Carissa bispinosa (L.) Desf. ex Brenan, indigenous
- Carissa macrocarpa (Eckl.) A.DC. indigenous
- Carissa spinarum L. indigenous
- Carissa tetramera (Sacleux) Stapf, indigenous
- Carissa wyliei N.E.Br. accepted as Carissa bispinosa (L.) Desf. ex Brenan, indigenous

== Cascabela ==
Genus Cascabela:

- Cascabela thevetia (L.) Lippold, not indigenous, cultivated, naturalised, invasive

== Catharanthus ==
Genus Catharanthus:

- Catharanthus roseus (L.) G.Don, not indigenous, naturalised, invasive

== Ceropegia ==
Genus Ceropegia:

- Ceropegia africana R.Br. indigenous
  - Ceropegia africana R.Br. subsp. africana, endemic
  - Ceropegia africana R.Br. subsp. barklyi Bruyns, indigenous
- Ceropegia ampliata E.Mey. indigenous
  - Ceropegia ampliata E.Mey. var. ampliata, indigenous
- Ceropegia antennifera Schltr. endemic
- Ceropegia apiculata Schltr. accepted as Ceropegia lugardae N.E.Br.
- Ceropegia arenaria R.A.Dyer, endemic
- Ceropegia barbata R.A.Dyer, endemic
- Ceropegia barbertonensis N.E.Br. accepted as Ceropegia linearis E.Mey. subsp. woodii (Schltr.) H.Huber
- Ceropegia barklyi Hook.f. accepted as Ceropegia africana R.Br. subsp. barklyi Bruyns, present
- Ceropegia bowkeri Harv. indigenous
  - Ceropegia bowkeri Harv. subsp. bowkeri, endemic
  - Ceropegia bowkeri Harv. subsp. sororia (Harv. ex Hook.f.) R.A.Dyer, endemic
- Ceropegia cancellata Rchb. endemic
- Ceropegia carnosa E.Mey. indigenous
- Ceropegia cimiciodora Oberm. indigenous
- Ceropegia connivens R.A.Dyer, accepted as Ceropegia fimbriata E.Mey. subsp. connivens (R.A.Dyer) Bruyns, present
  - Ceropegia connivens R.A.Dyer forma angustata R.A.Dyer, accepted as Ceropegia fimbriata E.Mey. subsp. connivens (R.A.Dyer) Bruyns, present
- Ceropegia conrathii Schltr. endemic
- Ceropegia craibii J.Victor, endemic
- Ceropegia crassifolia Schltr. indigenous
  - Ceropegia crassifolia Schltr. var. crassifolia, indigenous
- Ceropegia cycniflora R.A.Dyer, endemic
- Ceropegia decidua E.A.Bruce, indigenous
  - Ceropegia decidua E.A.Bruce subsp. decidua, indigenous
  - Ceropegia decidua E.A.Bruce subsp. pretoriensis R.A.Dyer, endemic
- Ceropegia distincta N.E.Br. indigenous
  - Ceropegia distincta N.E.Br. subsp. haygarthii (Schltr.) H.Huber, accepted as Ceropegia haygarthii Schltr. present
  - Ceropegia distincta N.E.Br. subsp. lugardae (N.E.Br.) H.Huber, accepted as Ceropegia lugardae N.E.Br.
  - Ceropegia distincta N.E.Br. subsp. verruculosa R.A.Dyer, endemic
- Ceropegia dubia R.A.Dyer, endemic
- Ceropegia filiformis (Burch.) Schltr. indigenous
- Ceropegia fimbriata E.Mey. indigenous
  - Ceropegia fimbriata E.Mey. subsp. connivens (R.A.Dyer) Bruyns, endemic
  - Ceropegia fimbriata E.Mey. subsp. fimbriata, indigenous
  - Ceropegia fimbriata E.Mey. subsp. geniculata (R.A.Dyer) Bruyns, endemic
- Ceropegia fortuita R.A.Dyer, indigenous
- Ceropegia geniculata R.A.Dyer, accepted as Ceropegia fimbriata E.Mey. subsp. geniculata (R.A.Dyer) Bruyns, present
- Ceropegia hastata N.E.Br. accepted as Ceropegia linearis E.Mey. subsp. woodii (Schltr.) H.Huber
- Ceropegia haygarthii Schltr. endemic
- Ceropegia insignis R.A.Dyer, endemic
- Ceropegia leptophylla Bruyns, indigenous
- Ceropegia linearis E.Mey. indigenous
  - Ceropegia linearis E.Mey. subsp. linearis, indigenous
  - Ceropegia linearis E.Mey. subsp. tenuis (N.E.Br.) Bruyns, endemic
  - Ceropegia linearis E.Mey. subsp. woodii (Schltr.) H.Huber, indigenous
- Ceropegia macmasteri A.P.Dold, indigenous
- Ceropegia mafekingensis (N.E.Br.) R.A.Dyer, indigenous
- Ceropegia meyeri Decne. indigenous
- Ceropegia multiflora Baker, indigenous
  - Ceropegia multiflora Baker subsp. multiflora, indigenous
  - Ceropegia multiflora Baker subsp. tentaculata (N.E.Br.) H.Huber, indigenous
- Ceropegia namaquensis Bruyns, endemic
- Ceropegia nilotica Kotschy, indigenous
  - Ceropegia nilotica Kotschy var. nilotica, indigenous
- Ceropegia occidentalis R.A.Dyer, indigenous
- Ceropegia occulta R.A.Dyer, endemic
- Ceropegia pachystelma Schltr. indigenous
  - Ceropegia pachystelma Schltr. subsp. pachystelma, indigenous
- Ceropegia pumila N.E.Br. accepted as Brachystelma gymnopodum (Schltr.) Bruyns
- Ceropegia pygmaea Schinz, accepted as Brachystelma gymnopodum (Schltr.) Bruyns, present
- Ceropegia racemosa N.E.Br. subsp. setifera (Schltr.) H.Huber, accepted as Ceropegia carnosa E.Mey. present
- Ceropegia radicans Schltr. indigenous
  - Ceropegia radicans Schltr. subsp. radicans, endemic
  - Ceropegia radicans Schltr. subsp. smithii (M.R.Hend.) R.A.Dyer, indigenous
- Ceropegia rendallii N.E.Br. indigenous
- Ceropegia rudatisii Schltr. endemic
- Ceropegia sandersonii Decne. ex Hook. indigenous
- Ceropegia scabriflora N.E.Br. endemic
- Ceropegia schoenlandii N.E.Br. accepted as Ceropegia linearis E.Mey. subsp. woodii (Schltr.) H.Huber
- Ceropegia stapeliiformis Haw. indigenous
  - Ceropegia stapeliiformis Haw. subsp. serpentina (E.A.Bruce) R.A.Dyer, indigenous
  - Ceropegia stapeliiformis Haw. subsp. stapeliiformis, endemic
- Ceropegia stenantha K.Schum. indigenous
- Ceropegia stentiae E.A.Bruce, endemic
- Ceropegia tenuis N.E.Br. accepted as Ceropegia linearis E.Mey. subsp. tenuis (N.E.Br.) Bruyns, present
- Ceropegia tomentosa Schltr. endemic
- Ceropegia turricula E.A.Bruce, endemic
- Ceropegia woodii Schltr. accepted as Ceropegia linearis E.Mey. subsp. woodii (Schltr.) H.Huber, present
- Ceropegia zeyheri Schltr. endemic

== Chlorocyathus ==
Genus Chlorocyathus:

- Chlorocyathus lobulata (Venter & R.L.Verh.) Venter, endemic
- Chlorocyathus monteiroae Oliv. indigenous

== Cordylogyne ==
Genus Cordylogyne:

- Cordylogyne globosa E.Mey. indigenous

== Cryptolepis ==
Genus Cryptolepis:

- Cryptolepis capensis Schltr. indigenous
- Cryptolepis cryptolepioides (Schltr.) Bullock, indigenous
- Cryptolepis decidua (Planch. ex Benth.) N.E.Br. indigenous
- Cryptolepis delagoensis Schltr. indigenous
- Cryptolepis oblongifolia (Meisn.) Schltr. indigenous
- Cryptolepis obtusa N.E.Br. indigenous
- Cryptolepis transvaalensis Schltr. accepted as Cryptolepis cryptolepioides (Schltr.) Bullock, present

== Cryptostegia ==
Genus Cryptostegia:

- Cryptostegia grandiflora R.Br. not indigenous, naturalised, invasive
- Cryptostegia madagascariensis Bojer, not indigenous, naturalised, invasive

== Curroria ==
Genus Curroria:

- Curroria decidua Planch. ex Benth. subsp. decidua, accepted as Cryptolepis decidua (Planch. ex Benth.) N.E.Br. present

== Cynanchum ==
Genus Cynanchum:

- Cynanchum africanum (L.) Hoffmanns. endemic
  - Cynanchum africanum R.Br. var. crassifolium N.E.Br. accepted as Cynanchum africanum (L.) Hoffmanns. present
- Cynanchum capense Thunb. accepted as Pentatropis capensis (L.f.) Bullock, present
- Cynanchum ellipticum (Harv.) R.A.Dyer, indigenous
- Cynanchum gerrardii (Harv.) Liede, indigenous
- Cynanchum hastatum Pers. accepted as Leptadenia hastata (Pers.) Decne.
- Cynanchum intermedium N.E.Br. accepted as Cynanchum africanum (L.) Hoffmanns. present
- Cynanchum meyeri (Decne.) Schltr. indigenous
- Cynanchum mossambicense K.Schum. indigenous
- Cynanchum natalitium Schltr. endemic
- Cynanchum obtusifolium L.f. indigenous
  - Cynanchum obtusifolium L.f. var. pilosum Schltr. accepted as Cynanchum obtusifolium L.f. present
- Cynanchum orangeanum (Schltr.) N.E.Br. indigenous
- Cynanchum pearsonianum Liede & Meve, indigenous
- Cynanchum schistoglossum Schltr. indigenous
- Cynanchum validum N.E.Br. accepted as Schizostephanus alatus Hochst. ex K.Schum. indigenous
- Cynanchum viminale (L.) Bassi, indigenous
  - Cynanchum viminale (L.) Bassi subsp. orangeanum (Liede & Meve) Liede & Meve, endemic
  - Cynanchum viminale (L.) Bassi subsp. suberosum (Meve & Liede) Goyder, indigenous
  - Cynanchum viminale (L.) Bassi subsp. thunbergii (G.Don) Liede & Meve, indigenous
  - Cynanchum viminale (L.) Bassi subsp. viminale, indigenous
- Cynanchum virens (E.Mey.) D.Dietr. indigenous
- Cynanchum zeyheri Schltr. endemic

== Daemia ==
Genus Daemia:

- Daemia barbata Schltr. accepted as Pergularia daemia (Forssk.) Chiov. subsp. daemia

== Dichaelia ==
Genus Dichaelia:

- Dichaelia breviflora Schltr. subsp. pygmaea Schltr. accepted as Brachystelma pygmaeum (Schltr.) N.E.Br. subsp. pygmaeum

== Diplorhynchus ==
Genus Diplorhynchus:

- Diplorhynchus condylocarpon (Mull.Arg.) Pichon, indigenous

== Dregea ==
Genus Dregea:

- Dregea floribunda E.Mey. accepted as Stephanotis ernstmeyeri S.Reuss, Liede & Meve, present
- Dregea macrantha Klotzsch, accepted as Stephanotis macrantha (Klotzsch) S.Reuss, Liede & Meve, present

== Duvalia ==
Genus Duvalia:

- Duvalia angustiloba N.E.Br. endemic
- Duvalia caespitosa (Masson) Haw. indigenous
  - Duvalia caespitosa (Masson) Haw. subsp. caespitosa, indigenous
  - Duvalia caespitosa (Masson) Haw. subsp. pubescens (N.E.Br.) Bruyns, indigenous
  - Duvalia caespitosa (Masson) Haw. subsp. vestita (Meve) Bruyns, endemic
  - Duvalia caespitosa (Masson) Haw. var. compacta (Haw.) Meve, accepted as Duvalia caespitosa (Masson) Haw. subsp. caespitosa, endemic
- Duvalia compacta Haw. accepted as Duvalia caespitosa (Masson) Haw. subsp. caespitosa, present
- Duvalia corderoyi (Hook.f.) N.E.Br. endemic
- Duvalia elegans (Masson) Haw. endemic
  - Duvalia elegans (Masson) Haw. var. namaquana N.E.Br. accepted as Duvalia caespitosa (Masson) Haw. subsp. pubescens (N.E.Br.) Bruyns, present
  - Duvalia elegans (Masson) Haw. var. seminuda N.E.Br. accepted as Duvalia elegans (Masson) Haw. present
- Duvalia emiliana A.C.White, accepted as Duvalia caespitosa (Masson) Haw. subsp. caespitosa, present
- Duvalia gracilis Meve, accepted as Duvalia modesta N.E.Br. endemic
- Duvalia immaculata (C.A.Luckh.) Bayer ex L.C.Leach, endemic
- Duvalia maculata N.E.Br. indigenous
- Duvalia modesta N.E.Br. endemic
- Duvalia parviflora N.E.Br. endemic
- Duvalia pillansii N.E.Br. endemic
  - Duvalia pillansii N.E.Br. var. albanica N.E.Br. accepted as Duvalia pillansii N.E.Br. present
- Duvalia polita N.E.Br. indigenous
  - Duvalia polita N.E.Br. var. parviflora (L.Bolus) A.C.White & B.Sloane, accepted as Duvalia polita N.E.Br. present
  - Duvalia polita N.E.Br. var. transvaalensis (Schltr.) A.C.White & B.Sloane, accepted as Duvalia polita N.E.Br. present
- Duvalia procumbens R.A.Dyer, accepted as Huernia procumbens (R.A.Dyer) L.C.Leach, present
- Duvalia pubescens N.E.Br. accepted as Duvalia caespitosa (Masson) Haw. subsp. pubescens (N.E.Br.) Bruyns, present
  - Duvalia pubescens N.E.Br. var. major N.E.Br. accepted as Duvalia caespitosa (Masson) Haw. subsp. pubescens (N.E.Br.) Bruyns, present
- Duvalia radiata (Sims) Haw. accepted as Duvalia caespitosa (Masson) Haw. subsp. caespitosa, present
  - Duvalia radiata (Sims) Haw. var. hirtella (Jacq.) A.C.White & B.Sloane, accepted as Duvalia caespitosa (Masson) Haw. subsp. caespitosa, present
  - Duvalia radiata (Sims) Haw. var. minor (N.E.Br.) A.C.White & B.Sloane, accepted as Duvalia caespitosa (Masson) Haw. subsp. caespitosa, present
  - Duvalia radiata (Sims) Haw. var. obscura (N.E.Br.) A.C.White & B.Sloane, accepted as Duvalia caespitosa (Masson) Haw. subsp. caespitosa, present
- Duvalia reclinata (Masson) Haw. accepted as Duvalia caespitosa (Masson) Haw. subsp. caespitosa, present
- Duvalia reclinata (Masson) Haw. var. angulata N.E.Br. accepted as Duvalia caespitosa (Masson) Haw. subsp. caespitosa, present
- Duvalia reclinata (Masson) Haw. var. bifida N.E.Br. accepted as Duvalia caespitosa (Masson) Haw. subsp. caespitosa, present
- Duvalia vestita Meve, accepted as Duvalia caespitosa (Masson) Haw. subsp. vestita (Meve) Bruyns, endemic

== Echites ==
Genus Echites:

- Echites succulentus L.f. accepted as Pachypodium succulentum (L.f.) Sweet, indigenous
- Echites tuberosus Haw. ex Steud. accepted as Pachypodium succulentum (L.f.) Sweet, indigenous

== Ectadiopsis ==
Genus Ectadiopsis:

- Ectadiopsis acutifolia (Sond.) Benth. accepted as Cryptolepis oblongifolia (Meisn.) Schltr.
- Ectadiopsis oblongifolia (Meisn.) Benth. accepted as Cryptolepis oblongifolia (Meisn.) Schltr. present

== Ectadium ==
Genus Ectadium:

- Ectadium virgatum E.Mey. indigenous

== Emplectanthus ==
Genus Emplectanthus:

- Emplectanthus cordatus N.E.Br. endemic
- Emplectanthus dalzellii D.G.A.Styles, endemic
- Emplectanthus gerrardii N.E.Br. endemic

== Ephippiocarpa ==
Genus Ephippiocarpa:

- Ephippiocarpa orientalis (S.Moore) Markgr. accepted as Callichilia orientalis S.Moore, present

== Eustegia ==
Genus Eustegia:

- Eustegia filiformis (L.f.) Schult. endemic
- Eustegia fraterna N.E.Br. indigenous
  - Eustegia fraterna N.E.Br. var. fraterna, endemic
  - Eustegia fraterna N.E.Br. var. pubescens N.E.Br. endemic
- Eustegia macropetala Schltr. endemic
- Eustegia minuta (L.f.) R.Br. endemic
- Eustegia plicata Schinz, endemic

== Fanninia ==
Genus Fanninia:

- Fanninia caloglossa Harv. endemic

== Fockea ==
Genus Fockea:

- Fockea angustifolia K.Schum. indigenous
- Fockea capensis Endl. endemic
- Fockea comaru (E.Mey.) N.E.Br. indigenous
- Fockea crispa (Jacq.) K.Schum. accepted as Fockea capensis Endl. present
- Fockea cylindrica R.A.Dyer, accepted as Fockea edulis (Thunb.) K.Schum. present
- Fockea edulis (Thunb.) K.Schum. indigenous
- Fockea gracilis R.A.Dyer, accepted as Fockea comaru (E.Mey.) N.E.Br. present
- Fockea multiflora K.Schum. indigenous
- Fockea sinuata (E.Mey.) Druce, indigenous
- Fockea tugelensis N.E.Br. accepted as Fockea angustifolia K.Schum. present

== Gomphocarpus ==
Genus Gomphocarpus:

- Gomphocarpus cancellatus (Burm.f.) Bruyns, indigenous
- Gomphocarpus diploglossus Turcz. accepted as Aspidonepsis diploglossa (Turcz.) Nicholas & Goyder, indigenous
- Gomphocarpus filiformis (E.Mey.) D.Dietr. indigenous
- Gomphocarpus fruticosus (L.) Aiton f. indigenous
  - Gomphocarpus fruticosus (L.) Aiton f. subsp. decipiens (N.E.Br.) Goyder & Nicholas, indigenous
  - Gomphocarpus fruticosus (L.) Aiton f. subsp. fruticosus, indigenous
- Gomphocarpus glaucophyllus Schltr. indigenous
- Gomphocarpus physocarpus E.Mey. indigenous
- Gomphocarpus rivularis Schltr. indigenous
- Gomphocarpus tomentosus (Torr.) A.Gray, accepted as Asclepias californica Greene, present
- Gomphocarpus tomentosus Burch. indigenous
  - Gomphocarpus tomentosus Burch. subsp. tomentosus, indigenous

== Gonioma ==
Genus Gonioma:

- Gonioma kamassi E.Mey. indigenous

== Gymnema ==
Genus Gymnema:

- Gymnema sylvestre (Retz.) Schult. accepted as Marsdenia sylvestris (Retz.) P.I.Forst. present

== Holarrhena ==
Genus Holarrhena:

- Holarrhena pubescens (Buch.-Ham.) Wall. ex G.Don, indigenous

== Hoodia ==
Genus Hoodia:

- Hoodia albispina N.E.Br. accepted as Hoodia gordonii (Masson) Sweet ex Decne. present
- Hoodia alstonii (N.E.Br.) Plowes, indigenous
- Hoodia bainii Dyer, accepted as Hoodia gordonii (Masson) Sweet ex Decne. present
- Hoodia barklyi Dyer, accepted as Hoodia gordonii (Masson) Sweet ex Decne. present
- Hoodia burkei N.E.Br. accepted as Hoodia gordonii (Masson) Sweet ex Decne. present
- Hoodia currorii (Hook.) Decne. indigenous
  - Hoodia currorii (Hook.) Decne. subsp. lugardii (N.E.Br.) Bruyns, indigenous
  - Hoodia currorii (Hook.) Decne. var. currorii, accepted as Hoodia currorii (Hook.) Decne. subsp. currorii
- Hoodia currorii (Hook.) Decne. var. minor R.A.Dyer, accepted as Hoodia currorii (Hook.) Decne. subsp. currorii
- Hoodia dinteri (A.Berger) Halda, accepted as Larryleachia marlothii (N.E.Br.) Plowes, indigenous
- Hoodia dregei N.E.Br. endemic
- Hoodia flava (N.E.Br.) Plowes, indigenous
- Hoodia gibbosa Nel, accepted as Hoodia currorii (Hook.) Decne. subsp. currorii
- Hoodia gordonii (Masson) Sweet ex Decne. indigenous
- Hoodia husabensis Nel, accepted as Hoodia gordonii (Masson) Sweet ex Decne.
- Hoodia langii Oberm. & Letty, accepted as Hoodia gordonii (Masson) Sweet ex Decne. present
- Hoodia lugardii N.E.Br. accepted as Hoodia currorii (Hook.) Decne. subsp. lugardii (N.E.Br.) Bruyns
  - Hoodia macrantha Dinter, accepted as Hoodia currorii (Hook.) Decne. subsp. currorii
- Hoodia montana Nel, accepted as Hoodia currorii (Hook.) Decne. subsp. currorii
- Hoodia officinalis (N.E.Br.) Plowes, indigenous
  - Hoodia officinalis (N.E.Br.) Plowes subsp. officinalis, indigenous
- Hoodia pilifera (L.f.) Plowes, indigenous
  - Hoodia pilifera (L.f.) Plowes subsp. annulata (N.E.Br.) Bruyns, endemic
  - Hoodia pilifera (L.f.) Plowes subsp. pilifera, endemic
  - Hoodia pilifera (L.f.) Plowes subsp. pillansii (N.E.Br.) Bruyns, accepted as Hoodia grandis (N.E.Br.) Plowes, endemic
- Hoodia pillansii N.E.Br. accepted as Hoodia gordonii (Masson) Sweet ex Decne. present
- Hoodia rosea Oberm. & Letty, accepted as Hoodia gordonii (Masson) Sweet ex Decne. present
- Hoodia similis (N.E.Br.) Halda, accepted as Larryleachia cactiformis (Hook.) Plowes var. cactiformis, indigenous
- Hoodia triebneri Schuldt, accepted as Hoodia triebneri (Nel) Bruyns
- Hoodia whitesloaneana Dinter, accepted as Hoodia gordonii (Masson) Sweet ex Decne.

== Huernia ==
Genus Huernia:

- Huernia barbata (Masson) Haw. indigenous
  - Huernia barbata (Masson) Haw. subsp. barbata, indigenous
  - Huernia barbata (Masson) Haw. subsp. ingeae (Lavranos) Bruyns, endemic
  - Huernia barbata (Masson) Haw. var. griquensis N.E.Br. accepted as Huernia barbata (Masson) Haw. subsp. barbata, present
- Huernia bayeri L.C.Leach, accepted as Huernia thuretii F.Cels, endemic
- Huernia blackbeardiae R.A.Dyer ex H.Jacobsen, accepted as Huernia zebrina N.E.Br. subsp. zebrina
- Huernia blyderiverensis (L.C.Leach) Bruyns, endemic
- Huernia brevirostris N.E.Br. accepted as Huernia thuretii F.Cels, present
  - Huernia brevirostris N.E.Br. subsp. baviaana L.C.Leach, accepted as Huernia thuretii F.Cels, endemic
  - Huernia brevirostris N.E.Br. subsp. intermedia (N.E.Br.) L.C.Leach, accepted as Huernia thuretii F.Cels, endemic
  - Huernia brevirostris N.E.Br. var. ecornuta (N.E.Br.) A.C.White & B.Sloane, accepted as Huernia thuretii F.Cels, endemic
  - Huernia brevirostris N.E.Br. var. histrionica A.C.White & B.Sloane, accepted as Huernia thuretii F.Cels var. thuretii, present
  - Huernia brevirostris N.E.Br. var. immaculata (N.E.Br.) A.C.White & B.Sloane, accepted as Huernia thuretii F.Cels var. thuretii, present
  - Huernia brevirostris N.E.Br. var. intermedia N.E.Br. accepted as Huernia thuretii F.Cels var. thuretii, indigenous
  - Huernia brevirostris N.E.Br. var. longula (N.E.Br.) A.C.White & B.Sloane, accepted as Huernia thuretii F.Cels var. thuretii, present
  - Huernia brevirostris N.E.Br. var. pallida (N.E.Br.) A.C.White & B.Sloane, accepted as Huernia thuretii F.Cels var. thuretii, present
  - Huernia brevirostris N.E.Br. var. parvipuncta A.C.White & B.Sloane, accepted as Huernia thuretii F.Cels var. thuretii, present
  - Huernia brevirostris N.E.Br. var. scabra (N.E.Br.) A.C.White & B.Sloane, accepted as Huernia thuretii F.Cels var. thuretii, present
- Huernia campanulata (Masson) Haw. accepted as Huernia barbata (Masson) Haw. subsp. barbata, endemic
  - Huernia campanulata (Masson) Haw. var. denticoronata N.E.Br. accepted as Huernia barbata (Masson) Haw. subsp. barbata, present
- Huernia clavigera (Jacq.) Haw. accepted as Huernia barbata (Masson) Haw. subsp. barbata, endemic
  - Huernia clavigera (Jacq.) Haw. var. maritima N.E.Br. accepted as Huernia barbata (Masson) Haw. subsp. barbata, present
- Huernia confusa E.Phillips, accepted as Huernia zebrina N.E.Br. subsp. insigniflora (C.A.Maass) Bruyns, indigenous
- Huernia decemdentata N.E.Br. accepted as Huernia barbata (Masson) Haw. subsp. barbata, present
- Huernia echidnopsioides (L.C.Leach) L.C.Leach, accepted as Huernia longii Pillans subsp. echidnopsioides (L.C.Leach) Bruyns, endemic
- Huernia guttata (Masson) Haw. indigenous
  - Huernia guttata (Masson) Haw. subsp. calitzdorpensis L.C.Leach, accepted as Huernia guttata (Masson) Haw. subsp. guttata, endemic
  - Huernia guttata (Masson) Haw. subsp. guttata, endemic
  - Huernia guttata (Masson) Haw. subsp. reticulata (Masson) Bruyns, endemic
- Huernia humilis (Masson) Haw. endemic
- Huernia hystrix (Hook.f.) N.E.Br. indigenous
  - Huernia hystrix (Hook.f.) N.E.Br. subsp. hystrix, indigenous
  - Huernia hystrix (Hook.f.) N.E.Br. subsp. parvula (L.C.Leach) Bruyns, endemic
  - Huernia hystrix (Hook.f.) N.E.Br. var. parvula L.C.Leach, accepted as Huernia hystrix (Hook.f.) N.E.Br. subsp. parvula (L.C.Leach) Bruyns, endemic
- Huernia ingeae Lavranos, accepted as Huernia barbata (Masson) Haw. subsp. ingeae (Lavranos) Bruyns, present
- Huernia insigniflora C.A.Maass, accepted as Huernia zebrina N.E.Br. subsp. insigniflora (C.A.Maass) Bruyns, endemic
- Huernia kennedyana Lavranos, endemic
- Huernia kirkii N.E.Br. indigenous
- Huernia loeseneriana Schltr. indigenous
- Huernia longii Pillans, endemic
  - Huernia longii Pillans subsp. echidnopsioides (L.C.Leach) Bruyns, accepted as Huernia pillansii N.E.Br. subsp. echidnopsioides L.C.Leach, endemic
- Huernia longii Pillans subsp. longii, endemic
- Huernia longituba N.E.Br. indigenous
- Huernia namaquensis Pillans, indigenous
- Huernia nouhuysii I.Verd. endemic
- Huernia ocellata (Jacq.) Schult. accepted as Huernia guttata (Masson) Haw. subsp. guttata, present
- Huernia pendula E.A.Bruce, endemic
- Huernia piersii N.E.Br. endemic
- Huernia pillansii N.E.Br. endemic
  - Huernia pillansii N.E.Br. subsp. echidnopsioides L.C.Leach, accepted as Huernia echidnopsioides (L.C.Leach) L.C.Leach, indigenous
- Huernia praestans N.E.Br. endemic
- Huernia primulina N.E.Br. var. primulina, accepted as Huernia thuretii F.Cels, present
  - Huernia primulina N.E.Br. var. rugosa N.E.Br. accepted as Huernia thuretii F.Cels var. thuretii, present
- Huernia procumbens (R.A.Dyer) L.C.Leach, indigenous
- Huernia quinta (E.Phillips) A.C.White & B.Sloane, indigenous
  - Huernia quinta (E.Phillips) A.C.White & B.Sloane var. blyderiverensis L.C.Leach, accepted as Huernia blyderiverensis (L.C.Leach) Bruyns, endemic
- Huernia reticulata (Masson) Haw. accepted as Huernia guttata (Masson) Haw. subsp. reticulata (Masson) Bruyns, endemic
- Huernia simplex N.E.Br. accepted as Huernia humilis (Masson) Haw. present
- Huernia stapelioides Schltr. indigenous
- Huernia thudichumii L.C.Leach, accepted as Huernia humilis (Masson) Haw. endemic
- Huernia thuretii F.Cels, indigenous
  - Huernia thuretii F.Cels var. primulina (N.E.Br.) L.C.Leach, accepted as Huernia thuretii F.Cels, endemic
- Huernia transvaalensis Stent, endemic
- Huernia venusta (Masson) Haw. accepted as Huernia guttata (Masson) Haw. subsp. guttata, endemic
- Huernia whitesloaneana Nel, endemic
- Huernia witzenbergensis C.A.Luckh. endemic
- Huernia x distincta N.E.Br. endemic
- Huernia zebrina N.E.Br. indigenous
  - Huernia zebrina N.E.Br. subsp. insigniflora (C.A.Maass) Bruyns, endemic
  - Huernia zebrina N.E.Br. subsp. magniflora (E.Phillips) L.C.Leach, accepted as Huernia zebrina N.E.Br. subsp. zebrina, indigenous
  - Huernia zebrina N.E.Br. subsp. zebrina, indigenous
  - Huernia zebrina N.E.Br. var. magniflora E.Phillips, accepted as Huernia zebrina N.E.Br. subsp. zebrina, indigenous

== Huerniopsis ==
Genus Huerniopsis:

- Huerniopsis atrosanguinea (N.E.Br.) A.C.White & B.Sloane, accepted as Piaranthus atrosanguineus (N.E.Br.) Bruyns, present
- Huerniopsis decipiens N.E.Br. accepted as Piaranthus decipiens (N.E.Br.) Bruyns, present
- Huerniopsis gibbosa Nel, accepted as Piaranthus atrosanguineus (N.E.Br.) Bruyns

== Ischnolepis ==
Genus Ischnolepis:

- Ischnolepis natalensis (Schltr.) Venter, accepted as Petopentia natalensis (Schltr.) Bullock, endemic

== Jasminonerium ==
Genus Jasminonerium:

- Jasminonerium acuminatum (E.Mey.) Kuntze, accepted as Carissa bispinosa (L.) Desf. ex Brenan, indigenous
- Jasminonerium bispinosum (L.) Kuntze, accepted as Carissa bispinosa (L.) Desf. ex Brenan, indigenous
- Jasminonerium carandas Kuntze var. spinarum (L.) Kuntze, accepted as Carissa spinarum L. indigenous
- Jasminonerium edule (Vahl) Kuntze, accepted as Carissa spinarum L. indigenous
- Jasminonerium erythrocarpum (Eckl.) Kuntze, accepted as Carissa bispinosa (L.) Desf. ex Brenan, indigenous
- Jasminonerium ferox (E.Mey.) Kuntze, accepted as Carissa bispinosa (L.) Desf. ex Brenan, indigenous
- Jasminonerium grandiflorum (E.Mey.) Kuntze, accepted as Carissa macrocarpa (Eckl.) A.DC. indigenous
- Jasminonerium haematocarpum (Eckl.) Kuntze, accepted as Carissa bispinosa (L.) Desf. ex Brenan, indigenous
- Jasminonerium macrocarpum (Eckl.) Kuntze, accepted as Carissa macrocarpa (Eckl.) A.DC. indigenous

== Kanahia ==
Genus Kanahia:

- Kanahia laniflora (Forssk.) R.Br. indigenous

== Lagarinthus ==
Genus Lagarinthus:

- Lagarinthus filiformis E.Mey. accepted as Gomphocarpus filiformis (E.Mey.) D.Dietr. indigenous

== Landolphia ==
Genus Landolphia:

- Landolphia kirkii Dyer ex Hook.f. indigenous

== Larryleachia ==
Genus Larryleachia:

- Larryleachia cactiformis (Hook.) Plowes, indigenous
  - Larryleachia cactiformis (Hook.) Plowes var. cactiformis, indigenous
  - Larryleachia cactiformis (Hook.) Plowes var. felina (D.T.Cole) Bruyns, endemic
- Larryleachia dinteri (A.Berger) Plowes, accepted as Larryleachia marlothii (N.E.Br.) Plowes, indigenous
- Larryleachia felina (D.T.Cole) Plowes, accepted as Larryleachia cactiformis (Hook.) Plowes var. felina (D.T.Cole) Bruyns, present
- Larryleachia marlothii (N.E.Br.) Plowes, indigenous
- Larryleachia perlata (Dinter) Plowes, indigenous
- Larryleachia picta (N.E.Br.) Plowes, indigenous
- Larryleachia similis (N.E.Br.) Plowes, accepted as Larryleachia cactiformis (Hook.) Plowes var. cactiformis, endemic

== Lavrania ==
Genus Lavrania:

- Lavrania cactiformis (Hook.) Bruyns, accepted as Larryleachia cactiformis (Hook.) Plowes, present
- Lavrania marlothii (N.E.Br.) Bruyns, accepted as Larryleachia marlothii (N.E.Br.) Plowes, present
- Lavrania perlata (Dinter) Bruyns, accepted as Larryleachia perlata (Dinter) Plowes, present
- Lavrania picta (N.E.Br.) Bruyns, accepted as Larryleachia picta (N.E.Br.) Plowes, present
  - Lavrania picta (N.E.Br.) Bruyns subsp. parvipunctata Bruyns, accepted as Larryleachia tirasmontana Plowes

== Luckhoffia ==
Genus Luckhoffia:

- Luckhoffia beukmanii (C.A.Luckh.) A.C.White & B.Sloane, accepted as X Hoodiapelia beukmanii (C.A.Luckh.) G.D.Rowley, present

== Macropetalum ==
Genus Macropetalum:

- Macropetalum burchellii Decne. var. burchellii, accepted as Brachystelma burchellii (Decne.) Peckover var. burchellii, present
  - Macropetalum burchellii Decne. var. grandiflora N.E.Br. accepted as Brachystelma burchellii (Decne.) Peckover var. burchellii, present

== Marsdenia ==
Genus Marsdenia:

- Marsdenia floribunda (E.Mey.) N.E.Br. accepted as Marsdenia dregea (Harv.) Schltr. indigenous
- Marsdenia macrantha (Klotzsch) Schltr. indigenous
- Marsdenia sylvestris (Retz.) P.I.Forst. indigenous

== Microloma ==
Genus Microloma:

- Microloma armatum (Thunb.) Schltr. indigenous
  - Microloma armatum (Thunb.) Schltr. var. armatum, indigenous
  - Microloma armatum (Thunb.) Schltr. var. burchellii (N.E.Br.) Bruyns, indigenous
- Microloma burchellii N.E.Br. accepted as Microloma armatum (Thunb.) Schltr. var. burchellii (N.E.Br.) Bruyns, present
- Microloma calycinum E.Mey. indigenous
  - Microloma calycinum E.Mey. subsp. flavescens (E.Mey.) Wanntorp, accepted as Microloma calycinum E.Mey. present
- Microloma campanulatum Wanntorp, accepted as Microloma armatum (Thunb.) Schltr. var. armatum, present
- Microloma dregei (E.Mey.) Wanntorp, accepted as Microloma armatum (Thunb.) Schltr. var. armatum, present
- Microloma gibbosum N.E.Br. accepted as Microloma sagittatum (L.) R.Br. present
- Microloma glabratum E.Mey. accepted as Microloma sagittatum (L.) R.Br. present
  - Microloma glabratum E.Mey. subsp. subglabratum Wanntorp, accepted as Microloma sagittatum (L.) R.Br. present
- Microloma hystricoides Wanntorp, accepted as Microloma armatum (Thunb.) Schltr. var. armatum, present
- Microloma incanum Decne. indigenous
- Microloma longitubum Schltr. indigenous
- Microloma namaquense Bolus, endemic
- Microloma poicilanthum H.Huber, indigenous
- Microloma sagittatum (L.) R.Br. endemic
  - Microloma sagittatum (L.) R.Br. subsp. pillansii Wanntorp, accepted as Microloma sagittatum (L.) R.Br. present
- Microloma schaferi Dinter, accepted as Microloma penicillatum Schltr.
- Microloma spinosum N.E.Br. subsp. dinteri (Schltr.) Wanntorp, accepted as Microloma armatum (Thunb.) Schltr. var. armatum
- Microloma spinosum N.E.Br. subsp. spinosum, accepted as Microloma armatum (Thunb.) Schltr. var. armatum, present
  - Microloma spinosum N.E.Br. subsp. velutinum Wanntorp, accepted as Microloma armatum (Thunb.) Schltr. var. armatum, present
- Microloma tenuifolium (L.) K.Schum. endemic
- Microloma viridiflorum N.E.Br. accepted as Microloma armatum (Thunb.) Schltr. var. burchellii (N.E.Br.) Bruyns, present

== Miraglossum ==
Genus Miraglossum:

- Miraglossum anomalum (N.E.Br.) Kupicha, endemic
- Miraglossum davyi (N.E.Br.) Kupicha, endemic
- Miraglossum laeve Kupicha, endemic
- Miraglossum pilosum (Schltr.) Kupicha, indigenous
- Miraglossum pulchellum (Schltr.) Kupicha, indigenous
- Miraglossum superbum Kupicha, endemic
- Miraglossum verticillare (Schltr.) Kupicha, endemic

== Mondia ==
Genus Mondia:

- Mondia whitei (Hook.f.) Skeels, indigenous

== Nerium ==
Genus Nerium:

- Nerium oleander L. not indigenous, naturalised, invasive

== Notechidnopsis ==
Genus Notechidnopsis:

- Notechidnopsis columnaris (Nel) Lavranos & Bleck, accepted as Richtersveldia columnaris (Nel) Meve & Liede, endemic
- Notechidnopsis tessellata (Pillans) Lavranos & Bleck, endemic

== Oncinema ==
Genus Oncinema:

- Oncinema lineare (L.f.) Bullock, indigenous

== Oncinotis ==
Genus Oncinotis:

- Oncinotis tenuiloba Stapf, indigenous

== Ophionella ==
Genus Ophionella:

- Ophionella arcuata (N.E.Br.) Bruyns, indigenous
- Ophionella arcuata (N.E.Br.) Bruyns subsp. arcuata, endemic
- Ophionella arcuata (N.E.Br.) Bruyns subsp. mirkinii (Pillans) Bruyns, endemic
- Ophionella willowmorensis Bruyns, endemic

== Orbea ==
Genus Orbea:

- Orbea carnosa (Stent) Bruyns, indigenous
  - Orbea carnosa (Stent) Bruyns subsp. carnosa, endemic
  - Orbea carnosa (Stent) Bruyns subsp. keithii (R.A.Dyer) Bruyns, indigenous
- Orbea ciliata (Thunb.) L.C.Leach, endemic
- Orbea conjuncta (A.C.White & B.Sloane) Bruyns, endemic
- Orbea cooperi (N.E.Br.) L.C.Leach, indigenous
- Orbea elegans Plowes, endemic
- Orbea gerstneri (Letty) Bruyns, indigenous
  - Orbea gerstneri (Letty) Bruyns subsp. elongata (R.A.Dyer) Bruyns, endemic
  - Orbea gerstneri (Letty) Bruyns subsp. gerstneri, indigenous
- Orbea hardyi (R.A.Dyer) Bruyns, endemic
- Orbea irrorata (Masson) L.C.Leach, accepted as Orbea verrucosa (Masson) L.C.Leach, present
- Orbea knobelii (E.Phillips) Bruyns, indigenous
- Orbea longidens (N.E.Br.) L.C.Leach, indigenous
- Orbea longii (C.A.Luckh.) Bruyns, endemic
- Orbea lugardii (N.E.Br.) Bruyns, indigenous
- Orbea lutea (N.E.Br.) Bruyns, indigenous
  - Orbea lutea (N.E.Br.) Bruyns subsp. lutea, indigenous
  - Orbea lutea (N.E.Br.) Bruyns subsp. vaga (N.E.Br.) Bruyns, indigenous
- Orbea macloughlinii (I.Verd.) L.C.Leach, endemic
- Orbea maculata (N.E.Br.) L.C.Leach, indigenous
  - Orbea maculata (N.E.Br.) L.C.Leach subsp. maculata, indigenous
- Orbea melanantha (Schltr.) Bruyns, indigenous
- Orbea miscella (N.E.Br.) Meve, endemic
- Orbea namaquensis (N.E.Br.) L.C.Leach, endemic
- Orbea paradoxa (I.Verd.) L.C.Leach, indigenous
- Orbea pulchella (Masson) L.C.Leach, endemic
- Orbea rangeana (Dinter & A.Berger) L.C.Leach, accepted as Orbea maculata (N.E.Br.) L.C.Leach subsp. rangeana (Dinter & A.Berger) Bruyns
- Orbea rogersii (L.Bolus) Bruyns, indigenous
- Orbea speciosa L.C.Leach, accepted as Orbea macloughlinii (I.Verd.) L.C.Leach, present
- Orbea tapscottii (I.Verd.) L.C.Leach, indigenous
- Orbea ubomboensis (I.Verd.) Bruyns, accepted as Australluma ubomboensis (I.Verd.) Bruyns, indigenous
- Orbea variegata (L.) Haw. endemic
- Orbea verrucosa (Masson) L.C.Leach, endemic
  - Orbea verrucosa (Masson) L.C.Leach var. fucosa (N.E.Br.) L.C.Leach, accepted as Orbea verrucosa (Masson) L.C.Leach, present
  - Orbea verrucosa (Masson) L.C.Leach var. verrucosa, accepted as Orbea verrucosa (Masson) L.C.Leach, present
- Orbea woodii (N.E.Br.) L.C.Leach, endemic

== Orbeanthus ==
Genus Orbeanthus:

- Orbeanthus conjunctus (A.C.White & B.Sloane) L.C.Leach, accepted as Orbea conjuncta (A.C.White & B.Sloane) Bruyns, present
- Orbeanthus hardyi (R.A.Dyer) L.C.Leach, accepted as Orbea hardyi (R.A.Dyer) Bruyns, present

== Orbeopsis ==
Genus Orbeopsis:

- Orbeopsis albocastanea (Marloth) L.C.Leach, accepted as Orbea albocastanea (Marloth) Bruyns
- Orbeopsis gerstneri (Letty) L.C.Leach subsp. elongata (R.A.Dyer) L.C.Leach, accepted as Orbea gerstneri (Letty) Bruyns subsp. elongata (R.A.Dyer) Bruyns, present
  - Orbeopsis gerstneri (Letty) L.C.Leach subsp. gerstneri, accepted as Orbea gerstneri (Letty) Bruyns subsp. gerstneri, present
- Orbeopsis knobelii (E.Phillips) L.C.Leach, accepted as Orbea knobelii (E.Phillips) Bruyns
- Orbeopsis lutea (N.E.Br.) L.C.Leach subsp. lutea, accepted as Orbea lutea (N.E.Br.) Bruyns subsp. lutea, present
  - Orbeopsis lutea (N.E.Br.) L.C.Leach subsp. vaga (N.E.Br.) L.C.Leach, accepted as Orbea lutea (N.E.Br.) Bruyns subsp. vaga (N.E.Br.) Bruyns, present
- Orbeopsis melanantha (Schltr.) L.C.Leach, accepted as Orbea melanantha (Schltr.) Bruyns, present
- Orbeopsis tsumebensis (Oberm.) L.C.Leach, accepted as Orbea huillensis (Hiern) Bruyns subsp. huillensis
- Orbeopsis valida (N.E.Br.) L.C.Leach, accepted as Orbea valida (N.E.Br.) Bruyns subsp. valida, present

== Orthanthera ==
Genus Orthanthera:

- Orthanthera jasminiflora (Decne.) Schinz, indigenous

== Pachycarpus ==
Genus Pachycarpus:

- Pachycarpus acidostelma M.Glen & Nicholas, indigenous
- Pachycarpus appendiculatus E.Mey. indigenous
- Pachycarpus asperifolius Meisn. indigenous
- Pachycarpus campanulatus (Harv.) N.E.Br. indigenous
- Pachycarpus campanulatus (Harv.) N.E.Br. var. campanulatus, indigenous
- Pachycarpus campanulatus (Harv.) N.E.Br. var. sutherlandii N.E.Br. indigenous
- Pachycarpus concolor E.Mey. indigenous
- Pachycarpus concolor E.Mey. subsp. arenicola Goyder, indigenous
- Pachycarpus concolor E.Mey. subsp. concolor, indigenous
- Pachycarpus concolor E.Mey. subsp. transvaalensis (Schltr.) Goyder, indigenous
- Pachycarpus coronarius E.Mey. endemic
- Pachycarpus dealbatus E.Mey. indigenous
- Pachycarpus decorus N.E.Br. accepted as Pachycarpus concolor E.Mey. subsp. transvaalensis (Schltr.) Goyder, present
- Pachycarpus galpinii (Schltr.) N.E.Br. indigenous
- Pachycarpus grandiflorus (L.f.) E.Mey. indigenous
  - Pachycarpus grandiflorus (L.f.) E.Mey. subsp. grandiflorus, endemic
  - Pachycarpus grandiflorus (L.f.) E.Mey. subsp. tomentosus (Schltr.) Goyder, indigenous
  - Pachycarpus grandiflorus (L.f.) E.Mey. var. tomentosus (Schltr.) N.E.Br. accepted as Pachycarpus grandiflorus (L.f.) E.Mey. subsp. tomentosus (Schltr.) Goyder, present
- Pachycarpus lebomboensis D.M.N.Sm. endemic
- Pachycarpus linearis (E.Mey.) N.E.Br. endemic
- Pachycarpus mackenii (Harv.) N.E.Br. endemic
- Pachycarpus macrochilus (Schltr.) N.E.Br. indigenous
- Pachycarpus natalensis N.E.Br. endemic
- Pachycarpus plicatus N.E.Br. endemic
- Pachycarpus reflectens E.Mey. endemic
- Pachycarpus rigidus E.Mey. indigenous
- Pachycarpus rostratus N.E.Br. endemic
- Pachycarpus scaber (Harv.) N.E.Br. indigenous
- Pachycarpus schinzianus (Schltr.) N.E.Br. indigenous
- Pachycarpus schweinfurthii (N.E.Br.) Bullock, accepted as Pachycarpus lineolatus (Decne.) Bullock
- Pachycarpus stenoglossus (E.Mey.) N.E.Br. endemic
- Pachycarpus suaveolens (Schltr.) Nicholas & Goyder, indigenous
- Pachycarpus transvaalensis (Schltr.) N.E.Br. accepted as Pachycarpus concolor E.Mey. subsp. transvaalensis (Schltr.) Goyder, indigenous
- Pachycarpus vexillaris E.Mey. indigenous

== Pachycymbium ==
Genus Pachycymbium:

- Pachycymbium carnosum (Stent) L.C.Leach, accepted as Orbea carnosa (Stent) Bruyns subsp. carnosa, present
- Pachycymbium keithii (R.A.Dyer) L.C.Leach, accepted as Orbea carnosa (Stent) Bruyns subsp. keithii (R.A.Dyer) Bruyns, present
- Pachycymbium lancasteri Lavranos, accepted as Orbea carnosa (Stent) Bruyns subsp. keithii (R.A.Dyer) Bruyns, present
- Pachycymbium lugardii (N.E.Br.) M.G.Gilbert, accepted as Orbea lugardii (N.E.Br.) Bruyns
- Pachycymbium miscellum (N.E.Br.) M.G.Gilbert, accepted as Orbea miscella (N.E.Br.) Meve, present
- Pachycymbium rogersii (L.Bolus) M.G.Gilbert, accepted as Orbea rogersii (L.Bolus) Bruyns, present
- Pachycymbium ubomboense (I.Verd.) M.G.Gilbert, accepted as Australluma ubomboensis (I.Verd.) Bruyns

== Pachypodium ==
Genus Pachypodium:

- Pachypodium bispinosum (L.f.) A.DC. endemic
- Pachypodium griquense L.Bolus, accepted as Pachypodium succulentum (L.f.) Sweet, indigenous
- Pachypodium jasminiflorum L.Bolus, accepted as Pachypodium succulentum (L.f.) Sweet, indigenous
- Pachypodium namaquanum (Wyley ex Harv.) Welw. indigenous
- Pachypodium saundersii N.E.Br. indigenous
- Pachypodium succulentum (L.f.) Sweet, endemic
- Pachypodium tomentosum G.Don, accepted as Pachypodium succulentum (L.f.) Sweet, indigenous
- Pachypodium tuberosum Lindl. accepted as Pachypodium succulentum (L.f.) Sweet, indigenous

== Parapodium ==
Genus Parapodium:

- Parapodium costatum E.Mey. indigenous
- Parapodium crispum N.E.Br. endemic
- Parapodium simile N.E.Br. endemic

== Pectinaria ==
Genus Pectinaria:

- Pectinaria arcuata N.E.Br. accepted as Ophionella arcuata (N.E.Br.) Bruyns subsp. arcuata, present
  - Pectinaria articulata]] (Aiton) Haw. indigenous
  - Pectinaria articulata (Aiton) Haw. subsp. articulata, endemic
  - Pectinaria articulata (Aiton) Haw. subsp. asperiflora (N.E.Br.) Bruyns, endemic
  - Pectinaria articulata (Aiton) Haw. subsp. borealis Bruyns, endemic
  - Pectinaria articulata (Aiton) Haw. subsp. namaquensis (N.E.Br.) Bruyns, endemic
  - Pectinaria articulata (Aiton) Haw. var. namaquensis N.E.Br. accepted as Pectinaria articulata (Aiton) Haw. subsp. namaquensis (N.E.Br.) Bruyns, present
- Pectinaria asperiflora N.E.Br. accepted as Pectinaria articulata (Aiton) Haw. subsp. asperiflora (N.E.Br.) Bruyns, present
- Pectinaria breviloba R.A.Dyer, accepted as Stapeliopsis breviloba (R.A.Dyer) Bruyns, present
- Pectinaria exasperata Bruyns, accepted as Stapeliopsis exasperata (Bruyns) Bruyns, present
- Pectinaria longipes (N.E.Br.) Bruyns, indigenous
  - Pectinaria longipes (N.E.Br.) Bruyns subsp. longipes, endemic
  - Pectinaria longipes (N.E.Br.) Bruyns subsp. villetii (C.A.Luckh.) Bruyns, endemic
- Pectinaria maughanii (R.A.Dyer) Bruyns, endemic
- Pectinaria pillansii N.E.Br. accepted as Stapeliopsis pillansii (N.E.Br.) Bruyns, present
- Pectinaria saxatilis N.E.Br. accepted as Stapeliopsis saxatilis (N.E.Br.) Bruyns, indigenous
- Pectinaria stayneri M.B.Bayer, accepted as Stapeliopsis stayneri (M.B.Bayer) Bruyns, indigenous
- Pectinaria tulipiflora C.A.Luckh. accepted as Stapeliopsis saxatilis (N.E.Br.) Bruyns, indigenous

== Pentarrhinum ==
Genus Pentarrhinum:

- Pentarrhinum abyssinicum Decne. indigenous
  - Pentarrhinum abyssinicum Decne. subsp. abyssinicum, indigenous
- Pentarrhinum insipidum E.Mey. indigenous

== Pentopetia ==
Genus Pentopetia:

- Pentopetia natalensis Schltr. accepted as Petopentia natalensis (Schltr.) Bullock, indigenous

== Pergularia ==
Genus Pergularia:

- Pergularia daemia (Forssk.) Chiov. indigenous
  - Pergularia daemia (Forssk.) Chiov. subsp. daemia, indigenous
  - Pergularia daemia (Forssk.) Chiov. subsp. garipensis (E.Mey.) Goyder, indigenous
  - Pergularia daemia (Forssk.) Chiov. var. daemia, accepted as Pergularia daemia (Forssk.) Chiov. subsp. daemia
  - Pergularia daemia (Forssk.) Chiov. var. leiocarpa (K.Schum.) H.Huber, accepted as Pergularia daemia (Forssk.) Chiov. subsp. garipensis (E.Mey.) Goyder, indigenous

== Periglossum ==
Genus Periglossum:

- Periglossum angustifolium Decne. indigenous
- Periglossum kassnerianum Schltr. accepted as Periglossum mackenii Harv. present
- Periglossum mackenii Harv. indigenous
- Periglossum mossambicense Schltr. accepted as Periglossum mackenii Harv.
- Periglossum podoptyches Nicholas & Bester, endemic

== Petopentia ==
Genus Petopentia:

- Petopentia natalensis (Schltr.) Bullock, endemic
- Petopentia undulata Venter & A.M.Venter, endemic

== Piaranthus ==
Genus Piaranthus:

- Piaranthus atrosanguineus (N.E.Br.) Bruyns, indigenous
- Piaranthus barrydalensis Meve, accepted as Piaranthus geminatus (Masson) N.E.Br. subsp. geminatus, endemic
- Piaranthus comptus N.E.Br. endemic
  - Piaranthus comptus N.E.Br. var. ciliatus N.E.Br. accepted as Piaranthus comptus N.E.Br. present
- Piaranthus cornutus N.E.Br. var. cornutus, indigenous
- Piaranthus decipiens (N.E.Br.) Bruyns, indigenous
- Piaranthus decorus (Masson) N.E.Br. subsp. cornutus (N.E.Br.) Meve, accepted as Piaranthus geminatus (Masson) N.E.Br. subsp. decorus (Masson) Bruyns, indigenous
  - Piaranthus decorus (Masson) N.E.Br. subsp. decorus, accepted as Piaranthus geminatus (Masson) N.E.Br. subsp. decorus (Masson) Bruyns, endemic
- Piaranthus disparilis N.E.Br. accepted as Piaranthus geminatus (Masson) N.E.Br. subsp. geminatus, present
- Piaranthus foetidus N.E.Br. accepted as Piaranthus geminatus (Masson) N.E.Br. subsp. geminatus, present
  - Piaranthus foetidus N.E.Br. var. diversus N.E.Br. accepted as Piaranthus geminatus (Masson) N.E.Br. subsp. geminatus, present
  - Piaranthus foetidus N.E.Br. var. multipunctatus N.E.Br. accepted as Piaranthus geminatus (Masson) N.E.Br. subsp. geminatus, present
  - Piaranthus foetidus N.E.Br. var. pallidus N.E.Br. accepted as Piaranthus geminatus (Masson) N.E.Br. subsp. geminatus, present
  - Piaranthus foetidus N.E.Br. var. purpureus N.E.Br. accepted as Piaranthus geminatus (Masson) N.E.Br. subsp. geminatus, present
- Piaranthus framesii Pillans, accepted as Piaranthus punctatus (Masson) R.Br. var. framesii (Pillans) Bruyns, endemic
- Piaranthus geminatus (Masson) N.E.Br. indigenous
  - Piaranthus geminatus (Masson) N.E.Br. subsp. decorus (Masson) Bruyns, indigenous
  - Piaranthus geminatus (Masson) N.E.Br. subsp. geminatus, endemic
  - Piaranthus geminatus (Masson) N.E.Br. var. foetidus (N.E.Br.) Meve, accepted as Piaranthus geminatus (Masson) N.E.Br. subsp. geminatus, endemic
  - Piaranthus geminatus (Masson) N.E.Br. var. geminatus, accepted as Piaranthus geminatus (Masson) N.E.Br. subsp. geminatus, endemic
- Piaranthus globosus A.C.White & B.Sloane, accepted as Piaranthus geminatus (Masson) N.E.Br. subsp. geminatus, present
- Piaranthus mennellii C.A.Luckh. accepted as Piaranthus geminatus (Masson) N.E.Br. subsp. decorus (Masson) Bruyns, present
- Piaranthus pallidus C.A.Luckh. accepted as Piaranthus geminatus (Masson) N.E.Br. subsp. decorus (Masson) Bruyns, present
- Piaranthus parvulus N.E.Br. endemic
- Piaranthus pillansii N.E.Br. var. inconstans N.E.Br. accepted as Piaranthus geminatus (Masson) N.E.Br. subsp. geminatus, present
  - Piaranthus pillansii N.E.Br. var. pillansii, accepted as Piaranthus geminatus (Masson) N.E.Br. subsp. geminatus, present
- Piaranthus pulcher N.E.Br. accepted as Piaranthus geminatus (Masson) N.E.Br. subsp. decorus (Masson) Bruyns, present
  - Piaranthus pulcher N.E.Br. var. nebrownii (Dinter) A.C.White & B.Sloane, accepted as Piaranthus geminatus (Masson) N.E.Br. subsp. decorus (Masson) Bruyns, present
- Piaranthus punctatus (Masson) R.Br. indigenous
  - Piaranthus punctatus (Masson) R.Br. var. framesii (Pillans) Bruyns, endemic
  - Piaranthus punctatus (Masson) R.Br. var. punctatus, endemic
- Piaranthus ruschii Nel, accepted as Piaranthus cornutus N.E.Br. var. ruschii (Nel) Bruyns

== Quaqua ==
Genus Quaqua:

- Quaqua acutiloba (N.E.Br.) Bruyns, indigenous
- Quaqua arenicola (N.E.Br.) Plowes, indigenous
  - Quaqua arenicola (N.E.Br.) Plowes subsp. arenicola, endemic
  - Quaqua arenicola (N.E.Br.) Plowes subsp. pilifera (Bruyns) Bruyns, endemic
- Quaqua armata (N.E.Br.) Bruyns, indigenous
  - Quaqua armata (N.E.Br.) Bruyns subsp. arenicola (N.E.Br.) Bruyns, accepted as Quaqua arenicola (N.E.Br.) Plowes subsp. arenicola, present
  - Quaqua armata (N.E.Br.) Bruyns subsp. armata, endemic
  - Quaqua armata (N.E.Br.) Bruyns subsp. maritima Bruyns, endemic
  - Quaqua armata (N.E.Br.) Bruyns subsp. pilifera Bruyns, accepted as Quaqua arenicola (N.E.Br.) Plowes subsp. pilifera (Bruyns) Bruyns, present
- Quaqua aurea (C.A.Luckh.) Plowes, endemic
- Quaqua bayeriana (Bruyns) Plowes, endemic
- Quaqua cincta (C.A.Luckh.) Bruyns, endemic
- Quaqua framesii (Pillans) Bruyns, endemic
  - Quaqua incarnata (L.f.) Bruyns, indigenous
  - Quaqua incarnata (L.f.) Bruyns subsp. aurea (C.A.Luckh.) Bruyns, accepted as Quaqua aurea (C.A.Luckh.) Plowes, present
  - Quaqua incarnata (L.f.) Bruyns subsp. hottentotorum (N.E.Br.) Bruyns, indigenous
  - Quaqua incarnata (L.f.) Bruyns subsp. incarnata, endemic
  - Quaqua incarnata (L.f.) Bruyns subsp. incarnata var. tentaculata, accepted as Quaqua incarnata (L.f.) Bruyns subsp. tentaculata (Bruyns) Bruyns, present
  - Quaqua incarnata (L.f.) Bruyns subsp. tentaculata (Bruyns) Bruyns, endemic
- Quaqua inversa (N.E.Br.) Bruyns, endemic
  - Quaqua inversa (N.E.Br.) Bruyns var. cincta (C.A.Luckh.) Bruyns, accepted as Quaqua cincta (C.A.Luckh.) Bruyns, present
- Quaqua linearis (N.E.Br.) Bruyns, endemic
- Quaqua mammillaris (L.) Bruyns, indigenous
- Quaqua marlothii (N.E.Br.) Bruyns, accepted as Quaqua arida (N.E.Br.) Plowes, endemic
- Quaqua multiflora (R.A.Dyer) Bruyns, endemic
- Quaqua pallens Bruyns, endemic
- Quaqua parviflora (Masson) Bruyns, indigenous
  - Quaqua parviflora (Masson) Bruyns subsp. bayeriana Bruyns, accepted as Quaqua bayeriana (Bruyns) Plowes, present
  - Quaqua parviflora (Masson) Bruyns subsp. confusa (Plowes) Bruyns, endemic
  - Quaqua parviflora (Masson) Bruyns subsp. dependens (N.E.Br.) Bruyns, endemic
  - Quaqua parviflora (Masson) Bruyns subsp. gracilis (C.A.Luckh.) Bruyns, endemic
  - Quaqua parviflora (Masson) Bruyns subsp. parviflora, endemic
  - Quaqua parviflora (Masson) Bruyns subsp. pulchra Bruyns, accepted as Quaqua pulchra (Bruyns) Plowes, present
  - Quaqua parviflora (Masson) Bruyns subsp. swanepoelii (Lavranos) Bruyns, endemic
- Quaqua pillansii (N.E.Br.) Bruyns, endemic
- Quaqua pruinosa (Masson) Bruyns, indigenous
- Quaqua pulchra (Bruyns) Plowes, endemic
- Quaqua ramosa (Masson) Bruyns, endemic

== Raphionacme ==
Genus Raphionacme:

- Raphionacme burkei N.E.Br. accepted as Raphionacme velutina Schltr. present
- Raphionacme dyeri Retief & Venter, indigenous
- Raphionacme elata N.E.Br. accepted as Raphionacme galpinii Schltr. present
- Raphionacme elsana Venter & R.L.Verh. endemic
- Raphionacme flanaganii Schltr. indigenous
- Raphionacme galpinii Schltr. indigenous
- Raphionacme hirsuta (E.Mey.) R.A.Dyer, indigenous
- Raphionacme lobulata Venter & R.L.Verh. accepted as Chlorocyathus lobulata (Venter & R.L.Verh.) Venter, endemic
- Raphionacme lucens Venter & R.L.Verh. endemic
- Raphionacme monteiroae (Oliv.) N.E.Br. accepted as Chlorocyathus monteiroae Oliv. indigenous
- Raphionacme palustris Venter & R.L.Verh. endemic
- Raphionacme procumbens Schltr. indigenous
- Raphionacme velutina Schltr. indigenous
- Raphionacme villicorona Venter, indigenous
- Raphionacme zeyheri Harv. endemic

== Rauvolfia ==
Genus Rauvolfia:

- Rauvolfia afra Sond. indigenous

== Rhyssolobium ==
Genus Rhyssolobium:

- Rhyssolobium dumosum E.Mey. indigenous

== Richtersveldia ==
Genus Richtersveldia:

- Richtersveldia columnaris (Nel) Meve & Liede, endemic

== Riocreuxia ==
Genus Riocreuxia:

- Riocreuxia aberrans R.A.Dyer, endemic
- Riocreuxia alexandrina (H.Huber) R.A.Dyer, accepted as Riocreuxia flanaganii Schltr. var. alexandria H.Huber, endemic
- Riocreuxia bolusii N.E.Br. accepted as Riocreuxia torulosa (E.Mey.) Decne. var. bolusii (N.E.Br.) Masinde, endemic
- Riocreuxia burchellii K.Schum. accepted as Riocreuxia polyantha Schltr. present
- Riocreuxia flanaganii Schltr. endemic
  - Riocreuxia flanaganii Schltr. subsp. segregata R.A.Dyer, accepted as Riocreuxia polyantha Schltr.
  - Riocreuxia flanaganii Schltr. var. alexandria H.Huber, indigenous
  - Riocreuxia flanaganii Schltr. var. flanaganii, endemic
- Riocreuxia picta Schltr. indigenous
- Riocreuxia polyantha Schltr. indigenous
- Riocreuxia torulosa (E.Mey.) Decne. var. bolusii (N.E.Br.) Masinde, indigenous
  - Riocreuxia torulosa (E.Mey.) Decne. var. torulosa, indigenous
  - Riocreuxia torulosa Decne. indigenous
- Riocreuxia woodii N.E.Br. endemic

== Sarcostemma ==
Genus Sarcostemma:

- Sarcostemma pearsonii N.E.Br. accepted as Cynanchum pearsonianum Liede & Meve, indigenous
- Sarcostemma tetrapterum Turcz. accepted as Cynanchum tetrapterum (Turcz.) R.A.Dyer ex Bullock, present
- Sarcostemma thunbergii G.Don, accepted as Cynanchum viminale (L.) Bassi subsp. thunbergii (G.Don) Liede & Meve, indigenous
- Sarcostemma viminale (L.) R.Br. accepted as Cynanchum viminale (L.) Bassi subsp. viminale, indigenous
  - Sarcostemma viminale (L.) R.Br. subsp. orangeanum Liede & Meve, accepted as Cynanchum viminale (L.) Bassi subsp. orangeanum (Liede & Meve) Liede & Meve, endemic
  - Sarcostemma viminale (L.) R.Br. subsp. suberosum Meve & Liede, accepted as Cynanchum viminale (L.) Bassi subsp. suberosum (Meve & Liede) Goyder, indigenous
  - Sarcostemma viminale (L.) R.Br. subsp. thunbergii (G.Don) Liede & Meve, accepted as Cynanchum viminale (L.) Bassi subsp. thunbergii (G.Don) Liede & Meve, indigenous

== Schizoglossum ==
Genus Schizoglossum:

- Schizoglossum amatolicum Hilliard, endemic
- Schizoglossum aschersonianum Schltr. indigenous
  - Schizoglossum aschersonianum Schltr. var. aschersonianum, endemic
  - Schizoglossum aschersonianum Schltr. var. longipes N.E.Br. endemic
  - Schizoglossum aschersonianum Schltr. var. pygmaeum (Schltr.) N.E.Br. endemic
  - Schizoglossum aschersonianum Schltr. var. radiatum N.E.Br. endemic
- Schizoglossum atropurpureum E.Mey. indigenous
  - Schizoglossum atropurpureum]] E.Mey. subsp. atropurpureum, indigenous
  - Schizoglossum atropurpureum E.Mey. subsp. tridentatum (Schltr.) Kupicha, endemic
  - Schizoglossum atropurpureum E.Mey. subsp. virens (E.Mey.) Kupicha, endemic
- Schizoglossum austromontanum Bester & Nicholas, endemic
- Schizoglossum bidens E.Mey. indigenous
  - Schizoglossum bidens E.Mey. subsp. atrorubens (Schltr.) Kupicha, endemic
  - Schizoglossum bidens E.Mey. subsp. bidens, indigenous
  - Schizoglossum bidens E.Mey. subsp. galpinii (Schltr.) Kupicha, indigenous
  - Schizoglossum bidens E.Mey. subsp. gracile Kupicha, endemic
  - Schizoglossum bidens E.Mey. subsp. hirtum Kupicha, endemic
  - Schizoglossum bidens E.Mey. subsp. pachyglossum (Schltr.) Kupicha, indigenous
  - Schizoglossum bidens E.Mey. subsp. productum (N.E.Br.) Kupicha, endemic
- Schizoglossum capitatum Schltr. accepted as Asclepias dissona N.E.Br. present
- Schizoglossum cordifolium E.Mey. indigenous
- Schizoglossum crassipes S.Moore, indigenous
- Schizoglossum elingue N.E.Br. indigenous
  - Schizoglossum elingue N.E.Br. subsp. elingue, endemic
  - Schizoglossum elingue N.E.Br. subsp. purpureum Kupicha, indigenous
- Schizoglossum eustegioides (E.Mey.) Druce, endemic
- Schizoglossum filiforme (E.Mey.) Druce, accepted as Gomphocarpus filiformis (E.Mey.) D.Dietr. indigenous
- Schizoglossum flavum Schltr. endemic
- Schizoglossum garcianum Schltr. indigenous
- Schizoglossum hamatum E.Mey. endemic
- Schizoglossum hilliardiae Kupicha, endemic
- Schizoglossum ingomense N.E.Br. endemic
- Schizoglossum linifolium Schltr. indigenous
  - Schizoglossum linifolium Schltr. var. centrirostratum N.E.Br. endemic
  - Schizoglossum linifolium Schltr. var. linifolium, indigenous
- Schizoglossum montanum R.A.Dyer, indigenous
- Schizoglossum nitidum Schltr. indigenous
- Schizoglossum peglerae N.E.Br. endemic
- Schizoglossum periglossoides Schltr. endemic
- Schizoglossum quadridens N.E.Br. endemic
- Schizoglossum rubiginosum Hilliard, endemic
- Schizoglossum singulare Kupicha, endemic
- Schizoglossum stenoglossum Schltr. indigenous
  - Schizoglossum stenoglossum Schltr. subsp. flavum (N.E.Br.) Kupicha, endemic
  - Schizoglossum stenoglossum Schltr. subsp. latifolium Kupicha, endemic
  - Schizoglossum stenoglossum Schltr. subsp. stenoglossum, endemic
- Schizoglossum umbelluliferum Schltr. accepted as Stenostelma umbelluliferum (Schltr.) Bester & Nicholas, endemic

== Schizostephanus ==
Genus Schizostephanus:

- Schizostephanus alatus Hochst. ex K.Schum. indigenous

== Secamone ==
Genus Secamone:

- Secamone acutifolia Sond. accepted as Cryptolepis oblongifolia (Meisn.) Schltr.
- Secamone alpini Schult. indigenous
- Secamone delagoensis Schltr. indigenous
- Secamone filiformis (L.f.) J.H.Ross, indigenous
- Secamone gerrardii Harv. ex Benth. indigenous
- Secamone parvifolia (Oliv.) Bullock, indigenous
- Secamone zambeziaca Schltr. var. parvifolia N.E.Br. accepted as Secamone parvifolia (Oliv.) Bullock

== Sisyranthus ==
Genus Sisyranthus:

- Sisyranthus anceps Schltr. endemic
- Sisyranthus barbatus (Turcz.) N.E.Br. endemic
- Sisyranthus compactus N.E.Br. endemic
- Sisyranthus fanniniae N.E.Br. endemic
- Sisyranthus franksiae N.E.Br. endemic
- Sisyranthus huttoniae (S.Moore) S.Moore, indigenous
- Sisyranthus imberbis Harv. indigenous
- Sisyranthus macer (E.Mey.) Schltr. endemic
- Sisyranthus randii S.Moore, indigenous
- Sisyranthus saundersiae N.E.Br. endemic
- Sisyranthus trichostomus K.Schum. endemic
- Sisyranthus virgatus E.Mey. indigenous

== Sphaerocodon ==
Genus Sphaerocodon:

- Sphaerocodon natalense (Meisn.) Hook.f. indigenous

== Stapelia ==
Genus Stapelia:

- Stapelia acuminata Masson, endemic
- Stapelia arenosa C.A.Luckh. endemic
- Stapelia asterias Masson, accepted as Stapelia hirsuta L. var. hirsuta, endemic
- Stapelia barklyi N.E.Br. accepted as Orbea hybrid, present
- Stapelia baylissii L.C.Leach, accepted as Stapelia hirsuta L. var. baylissii (L.C.Leach) Bruyns, endemic
- Stapelia cactiformis Hook. accepted as Larryleachia cactiformis (Hook.) Plowes var. cactiformis, present
- Stapelia caespitosa Masson var. caespitosa, accepted as Duvalia caespitosa (Masson) Haw. subsp. caespitosa, present
- Stapelia caroli-schmidtii Dinter & A.Berger, accepted as Orbea albocastanea (Marloth) Bruyns
- Stapelia cedrimontana Frandsen, endemic
- Stapelia clavicorona I.Verd. endemic
- Stapelia conspurcata Willd. accepted as Orbea variegata (L.) Haw. present
- Stapelia divaricata Masson, endemic
- Stapelia engleriana Schltr. endemic
- Stapelia erectiflora N.E.Br. indigenous
  - Stapelia erectiflora N.E.Br. var. erectiflora, endemic
  - Stapelia erectiflora N.E.Br. var. prostratiflora L.C.Leach, endemic
- Stapelia flavopurpurea Marloth, indigenous
- Stapelia gariepensis Pillans, accepted as Stapelia hirsuta L. var. gariepensis (Pillans) Bruyns, indigenous
- Stapelia gettliffei R.Pott, indigenous
- Stapelia gigantea N.E.Br. indigenous
- Stapelia glabricaulis N.E.Br. accepted as Stapelia hirsuta L. var. tsomoensis (N.E.Br.) Bruyns, endemic
- Stapelia glanduliflora Masson, endemic
- Stapelia grandiflora Masson, indigenous
  - Stapelia grandiflora Masson var. conformis (N.E.Br.) Bruyns, endemic
  - Stapelia grandiflora Masson var. grandiflora, indigenous
- Stapelia hirsuta L. indigenous
  - Stapelia hirsuta L. var. baylissii (L.C.Leach) Bruyns, endemic
  - Stapelia hirsuta L. var. gariepensis (Pillans) Bruyns, indigenous
  - Stapelia hirsuta L. var. hirsuta, indigenous
  - Stapelia hirsuta L. var. tsomoensis (N.E.Br.) Bruyns, endemic
  - Stapelia hirsuta L. var. vetula (Masson) Bruyns, endemic
- Stapelia immelmaniae Pillans, accepted as Stapelia paniculata Willd. subsp. paniculata, endemic
- Stapelia kougabergensis L.C.Leach, accepted as Stapelia paniculata Willd. subsp. kougabergensis (L.C.Leach) Bruyns, endemic
- Stapelia kwebensis N.E.Br. indigenous
- Stapelia leendertziae N.E.Br. indigenous
- Stapelia longipedicellata (A.Berger) L.C.Leach, accepted as Stapelia kwebensis N.E.Br.
- Stapelia macowanii N.E.Br. var. conformis (N.E.Br.) L.C.Leach, accepted as Stapelia grandiflora Masson var. conformis (N.E.Br.) Bruyns, indigenous
  - Stapelia macowanii N.E.Br. var. macowanii, accepted as Stapelia grandiflora Masson var. conformis (N.E.Br.) Bruyns, endemic
- Stapelia meintjesii Verd. endemic
- Stapelia montana L.C.Leach var. grossa L.C.Leach, accepted as Stapelia cedrimontana Frandsen, endemic
  - Stapelia montana L.C.Leach var. montana, accepted as Stapelia cedrimontana Frandsen, endemic
- Stapelia obducta L.C.Leach, endemic
- Stapelia olivacea N.E.Br. endemic
- Stapelia paniculata Willd. indigenous
  - Stapelia paniculata Willd. subsp. kougabergensis (L.C.Leach) Bruyns, endemic
  - Stapelia paniculata Willd. subsp. paniculata, endemic
  - Stapelia paniculata Willd. subsp. scitula (L.C.Leach) Bruyns, endemic
- Stapelia peglerae N.E.Br. accepted as Stapelia hirsuta L. var. tsomoensis (N.E.Br.) Bruyns, endemic
- Stapelia pillansii N.E.Br. var. fontinalis Nel, accepted as Stapelia pillansii N.E.Br. endemic
  - Stapelia pillansii N.E.Br. var. pillansii, accepted as Stapelia pillansii N.E.Br. endemic
- Stapelia praetermissa L.C.Leach var. luteola L.C.Leach, accepted as Stapelia hirsuta L. var. baylissii (L.C.Leach) Bruyns, endemic
  - Stapelia praetermissa L.C.Leach var. praetermissa, accepted as Stapelia hirsuta L. var. baylissii (L.C.Leach) Bruyns, endemic
- Stapelia pulvinata Masson, accepted as Stapelia hirsuta L. var. hirsuta, present
- Stapelia rubiginosa Nel, endemic
- Stapelia rufa Masson, endemic
- Stapelia scitula L.C.Leach, accepted as Stapelia paniculata Willd. subsp. scitula (L.C.Leach) Bruyns, endemic
- Stapelia similis N.E.Br. indigenous
- Stapelia surrecta N.E.Br. endemic
- Stapelia tsomoensis N.E.Br. accepted as Stapelia hirsuta L. var. tsomoensis (N.E.Br.) Bruyns, endemic
- Stapelia unicornis C.A.Luckh. indigenous
- Stapelia vetula Masson, accepted as Stapelia hirsuta L. var. vetula (Masson) Bruyns, present
- Stapelia villetiae C.A.Luckh. endemic
- Stapelia x meintjiesii I.Verd. endemic

== Stapeliopsis ==
Genus Stapeliopsis:

- Stapeliopsis breviloba (R.A.Dyer) Bruyns, endemic
- Stapeliopsis cooperi (N.E.Br.) E.Phillips, accepted as Orbea cooperi (N.E.Br.) L.C.Leach
- Stapeliopsis exasperata (Bruyns) Bruyns, endemic
- Stapeliopsis khamiesbergensis Bruyns, endemic
- Stapeliopsis neronis Pillans, indigenous
- Stapeliopsis pillansii (N.E.Br.) Bruyns, endemic
- Stapeliopsis saxatilis (N.E.Br.) Bruyns, endemic
  - Stapeliopsis saxatilis (N.E.Br.) Bruyns subsp. stayneri (M.B.Bayer) Bruyns, accepted as Stapeliopsis stayneri (M.B.Bayer) Bruyns, endemic
- Stapeliopsis stayneri (M.B.Bayer) Bruyns, endemic
- Stapeliopsis urniflora Lavranos, indigenous

== Stenostelma ==
Genus Stenostelma:

- Stenostelma capense Schltr. indigenous
- Stenostelma corniculatum (E.Mey.) Bullock, indigenous
- Stenostelma eminens (Harv.) Bullock, accepted as Asclepias eminens (Harv.) Schltr. present
- Stenostelma umbelluliferum (Schltr.) Bester & Nicholas, endemic

== Stomatostemma ==
Genus Stomatostemma:

- Stomatostemma monteiroae (Oliv.) N.E.Br. indigenous

== Strophanthus ==
Genus Strophanthus:

- Strophanthus gerrardii Stapf, indigenous
- Strophanthus kombe Oliv. indigenous
- Strophanthus luteolus Codd, indigenous
- Strophanthus petersianus Klotzsch, indigenous
- Strophanthus speciosus (Ward & Harv.) Reber, indigenous

== Tabernaemontana ==
Genus Tabernaemontana:

- Tabernaemontana elegans Stapf, indigenous
- Tabernaemontana ventricosa Hochst. ex A.DC. indigenous

== Tacazzea ==
Genus Tacazzea:

- Tacazzea apiculata Oliv. indigenous
- Tacazzea natalensis (Schltr.) N.E.Br. accepted as Petopentia natalensis (Schltr.) Bullock, indigenous

== Tavaresia ==
Genus Tavaresia:

- Tavaresia barklyi (Dyer) N.E.Br. indigenous
- Tavaresia grandiflora (Dinter) A.Berger, accepted as Tavaresia barklyi (Dyer) N.E.Br. present
- Tavaresia meintjesii R.A.Dyer, indigenous

== Telosma ==
Genus Telosma:

- Telosma africana (N.E.Br.) N.E.Br. indigenous

== Tenaris ==
Genus Tenaris:

- Tenaris chlorantha Schltr. accepted as Brachystelma chloranthum (Schltr.) Peckover, present
- Tenaris christianeae (Peckover) J.Victor & Nicholas, accepted as Brachystelma christianeae Peckover, present
- Tenaris filifolia N.E.Br. accepted as Brachystelma filifolium (N.E.Br.) Peckover, present
- Tenaris rubella E.Mey. accepted as Brachystelma rubellum (E.Mey.) Peckover, present
- Tenaris schultzei (Schltr.) E.Phillips, accepted as Brachystelma schultzei (Schltr.) Bruyns

== Thevetia ==
Genus Thevetia:

- Thevetia peruviana (Pers.) K.Schum. accepted as Cascabela thevetia (L.) Lippold, not indigenous, naturalised, invasive

== Trachycalymma ==
Genus Trachycalymma:

- Trachycalymma cucullatum (Schltr.) Bullock, accepted as Asclepias cucullata (Schltr.) Schltr. subsp. cucullata, present

== Trichocaulon ==
Genus Trichocaulon:

- Trichocaulon alstonii N.E.Br. accepted as Hoodia alstonii (N.E.Br.) Plowes, present
- Trichocaulon annulatum N.E.Br. accepted as Hoodia pilifera (L.f.) Plowes subsp. annulata (N.E.Br.) Bruyns, present
- Trichocaulon cactiforme (Hook.) N.E.Br. accepted as Larryleachia cactiformis (Hook.) Plowes var. cactiformis, present
- Trichocaulon cinereum Pillans, accepted as Larryleachia perlata (Dinter) Plowes, present
- Trichocaulon delaetianum Dinter, accepted as Hoodia officinalis (N.E.Br.) Plowes subsp. delaetiana (Dinter) Bruyns
- Trichocaulon dinteri A.Berger, accepted as Larryleachia marlothii (N.E.Br.) Plowes
- Trichocaulon engleri Dinter, accepted as Larryleachia meloformis (Marloth) Plowes
- Trichocaulon felinum D.T.Cole, accepted as Larryleachia cactiformis (Hook.) Plowes var. felina (D.T.Cole) Bruyns, present
- Trichocaulon flavum N.E.Br. accepted as Hoodia flava (N.E.Br.) Plowes, present
- Trichocaulon grande N.E.Br. accepted as Hoodia grandis (N.E.Br.) Plowes, present
- Trichocaulon halenbergense Dinter, accepted as Hoodia alstonii (N.E.Br.) Plowes
- Trichocaulon keetmanshoopense Dinter, accepted as Larryleachia marlothii (N.E.Br.) Plowes
- Trichocaulon kubusense Nel, accepted as Larryleachia perlata (Dinter) Plowes, present
- Trichocaulon marlothii N.E.Br. accepted as Larryleachia marlothii (N.E.Br.) Plowes, present
- Trichocaulon meloforme Marloth, accepted as Larryleachia meloformis (Marloth) Plowes, present
- Trichocaulon officinale N.E.Br. accepted as Hoodia officinalis (N.E.Br.) Plowes subsp. officinalis, present
- Trichocaulon pedicellatum Schinz, accepted as Hoodia pedicellata (Schinz) Plowes
- Trichocaulon perlatum Dinter, accepted as Larryleachia perlata (Dinter) Plowes
- Trichocaulon pictum N.E.Br. accepted as Larryleachia picta (N.E.Br.) Plowes, present
- Trichocaulon piliferum (L.f.) N.E.Br. accepted as Hoodia pilifera (L.f.) Plowes subsp. pilifera, present
- Trichocaulon pillansii N.E.Br. accepted as Hoodia grandis (N.E.Br.) Plowes, present
- Trichocaulon pubiflorum Dinter, accepted as Hoodia officinalis (N.E.Br.) Plowes subsp. officinalis
- Trichocaulon rusticum N.E.Br. accepted as Hoodia officinalis (N.E.Br.) Plowes subsp. officinalis, present
- Trichocaulon simile N.E.Br. accepted as Larryleachia cactiformis (Hook.) Plowes var. cactiformis, present
- Trichocaulon sinus-luederitzii Dinter, accepted as Larryleachia marlothii (N.E.Br.) Plowes
- Trichocaulon sociarum A.C.White & B.Sloane, accepted as Larryleachia sociarum (A.C.White & B.Sloane) Plowes
- Trichocaulon triebneri Nel, accepted as Hoodia triebneri (Nel) Bruyns
- Trichocaulon truncatum Pillans, accepted as Larryleachia perlata (Dinter) Plowes, present

== Tridentea ==
Genus Tridentea:

- Tridentea aperta (Masson) L.C.Leach, accepted as Tromotriche aperta (Masson) Bruyns, present
- Tridentea baylissii (L.C.Leach) L.C.Leach var. baylissii, accepted as Tromotriche baylissii (L.C.Leach) Bruyns, present
  - Tridentea baylissii (L.C.Leach) L.C.Leach var. ciliata L.C.Leach, accepted as Tromotriche baylissii (L.C.Leach) Bruyns, present
- Tridentea choanantha (Lavranos & H.Hall) L.C.Leach, accepted as Tromotriche choanantha (Lavranos & H.Hall) Bruyns, present
- Tridentea dwequensis (C.A.Luckh.) L.C.Leach, endemic
- Tridentea gemmiflora (Masson) Haw. indigenous
- Tridentea herrei (Nel) L.C.Leach, accepted as Tromotriche herrei (Nel) Bruyns, present
- Tridentea jucunda (N.E.Br.) L.C.Leach, indigenous
  - Tridentea jucunda (N.E.Br.) L.C.Leach var. cincta (Marloth) L.C.Leach, accepted as Tridentea jucunda (N.E.Br.) L.C.Leach, present
  - Tridentea jucunda (N.E.Br.) L.C.Leach var. dinter (A.Berger) L.C.Leach, accepted as Tridentea jucunda (N.E.Br.) L.C.Leach
- Tridentea longii (C.A.Luckh.) L.C.Leach, accepted as Orbea longii (C.A.Luckh.) Bruyns, present
- Tridentea longipes (C.A.Luckh.) L.C.Leach, accepted as Tromotriche pedunculata (Masson) Bruyns subsp. longipes (C.A.Luckh.) Bruyns, present
- Tridentea marientalensis (Nel) L.C.Leach, indigenous
  - Tridentea marientalensis (Nel) L.C.Leach subsp. marientalensis, indigenous
- Tridentea pachyrrhiza (Dinter) L.C.Leach, indigenous
- Tridentea parvipuncta (N.E.Br.) L.C.Leach, indigenous
  - Tridentea parvipuncta (N.E.Br.) L.C.Leach subsp. parvipuncta, endemic
  - Tridentea parvipuncta (N.E.Br.) L.C.Leach subsp. truncata (C.A.Luckh.) Bruyns, endemic
  - Tridentea parvipuncta (N.E.Br.) L.C.Leach var. truncata (C.A.Luckh.) L.C.Leach, accepted as Tridentea parvipuncta (N.E.Br.) L.C.Leach subsp. truncata (C.A.Luckh.) Bruyns, present
- Tridentea peculiaris (C.A.Luckh.) L.C.Leach, endemic
- Tridentea pedunculata (Masson) L.C.Leach, accepted as Tromotriche pedunculata (Masson) Bruyns subsp. pedunculata, present
- Tridentea ruschiana (Dinter) L.C.Leach, accepted as Tromotriche ruschiana (Dinter) Bruyns
- Tridentea umdausensis (Nel) L.C.Leach, accepted as Tromotriche umdausensis (Nel) Bruyns, present
- Tridentea virescens (N.E.Br.) L.C.Leach, indigenous

== Tromotriche ==
Genus Tromotriche:

- Tromotriche aperta (Masson) Bruyns, indigenous
- Tromotriche baylissii (L.C.Leach) Bruyns, endemic
- Tromotriche choanantha (Lavranos & H.Hall) Bruyns, endemic
- Tromotriche engleriana (Schltr.) L.C.Leach, accepted as Stapelia engleriana Schltr. present
- Tromotriche herrei (Nel) Bruyns, endemic
- Tromotriche longii (C.A.Luckh.) Bruyns, accepted as Orbea longii (C.A.Luckh.) Bruyns, endemic
- Tromotriche longipes (C.A.Luckh.) Bruyns, accepted as Tromotriche pedunculata (Masson) Bruyns subsp. longipes (C.A.Luckh.) Bruyns, indigenous
- Tromotriche pedunculata (Masson) Bruyns, indigenous
  - Tromotriche pedunculata (Masson) Bruyns subsp. longipes (C.A.Luckh.) Bruyns, indigenous
  - Tromotriche pedunculata (Masson) Bruyns subsp. pedunculata, indigenous
- Tromotriche revoluta (Masson) Haw. endemic
- Tromotriche thudichumii (Pillans) L.C.Leach, endemic
- Tromotriche umdausensis (Nel) Bruyns, indigenous

== Tylophora ==
Genus Tylophora, now included in Vincetoxicum:

- Tylophora anomala, syn. of Vincetoxicum anomalum (N.E.Br.) Meve & Liede, endemic
- Tylophora badia, syn. of Vincetoxicum badium (E.Mey.) Meve & Liede, indigenous
- Tylophora coddii, syn. of Vincetoxicum coddii (Bullock) Meve & Liede, endemic
- Tylophora cordata, syn. of Vincetoxicum cordatum (R.Br. ex Schult.) Meve & Liede, endemic
- Tylophora flanaganii, syn. of Vincetoxicum flanaganii (Schltr.) Meve & Liede, endemic
- Tylophora lycioides, syn. of Vincetoxicum lycioides (E.Mey.) Kuntze, indigenous
- Tylophora simiana, syn. of Vincetoxicum simianum (Schltr.) Meve & Liede, endemic
- Tylophora umbellata, syn. of Vincetoxicum umbelliferum Meve & Liede, endemic

== Vinca ==
Genus Vinca:

- Vinca major L. not indigenous, naturalised, invasive
- Vinca minor L. not indigenous, naturalised, invasive

== Voacanga ==
Genus Voacanga:

- Voacanga thouarsii Roem. & Schult. indigenous

== Woodia ==
Genus Woodia:

- Woodia mucronata (Thunb.) N.E.Br. endemic
  - Woodia mucronata (Thunb.) N.E.Br. var. mucronata, accepted as Woodia mucronata (Thunb.) N.E.Br. present
  - Woodia mucronata (Thunb.) N.E.Br. var. trifurcata (Schltr.) N.E.Br. accepted as Woodia mucronata (Thunb.) N.E.Br. present
- Woodia singularis N.E.Br. indigenous
- Woodia verruculosa Schltr. endemic

== Wrightia ==
Genus Wrightia:

- Wrightia natalensis Stapf, indigenous

== Xysmalobium ==
Genus Xysmalobium:

- Xysmalobium acerateoides (Schltr.) N.E.Br. indigenous
- Xysmalobium asperum N.E.Br. indigenous
- Xysmalobium baurii N.E.Br. endemic
- Xysmalobium brownianum S.Moore, indigenous
- Xysmalobium carinatum (Schltr.) N.E.Br. endemic
- Xysmalobium confusum Scott-Elliot, indigenous
- Xysmalobium fluviale Bruyns, endemic
- Xysmalobium gerrardii Scott-Elliot, endemic
- Xysmalobium gomphocarpoides (E.Mey.) D.Dietr. indigenous
  - Xysmalobium gomphocarpoides (E.Mey.) D.Dietr. var. gomphocarpoides, endemic
  - Xysmalobium gomphocarpoides (E.Mey.) D.Dietr. var. parvilobum Bruyns, endemic
- Xysmalobium involucratum (E.Mey.) Decne. indigenous
- Xysmalobium orbiculare (E.Mey.) D.Dietr. indigenous
- Xysmalobium parviflorum Harv. ex Scott-Elliot, indigenous
- Xysmalobium pearsonii L.Bolus, endemic
- Xysmalobium pedifoetidum Bester & Nicholas, indigenous
- Xysmalobium prunelloides Turcz. endemic
- Xysmalobium stockenstromense Scott-Elliot, indigenous
- Xysmalobium trauseldii R.A.Dyer, accepted as Xysmalobium woodii N.E.Br. present
- Xysmalobium tysonianum (Schltr.) N.E.Br. indigenous
- Xysmalobium undulatum (L.) Aiton f. indigenous
  - Xysmalobium undulatum (L.) Aiton f. var. ensifolium Burch. ex Scott-Elliot, indigenous
  - Xysmalobium undulatum (L.) Aiton f. var. undulatum, indigenous
- Xysmalobium winterbergense N.E.Br. endemic
- Xysmalobium woodii N.E.Br. indigenous
- Xysmalobium zeyheri N.E.Br. endemic

== Hybrids ==
- X Hoodiapelia beukmanii (C.A.Luckh.) G.D.Rowley, endemic
- X Hoodiopsis triebneri C.A.Luckh. indigenous
