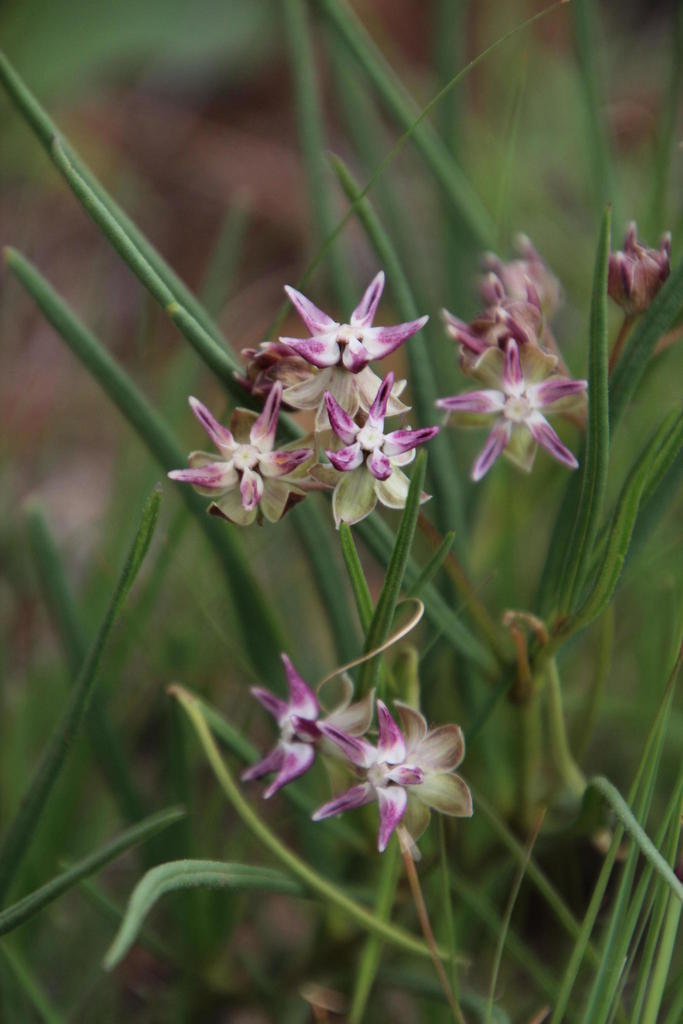
- Asclepias stellifera in bloom

Conservation status
- Least Concern (SANBI Red List)

Scientific classification
- Kingdom: Plantae
- Clade: Embryophytes
- Clade: Tracheophytes
- Clade: Angiosperms
- Clade: Eudicots
- Clade: Asterids
- Order: Gentianales
- Family: Apocynaceae
- Genus: Asclepias
- Species: A. stellifera

Binomial name
- Asclepias stellifera Schltr.

Synonyms
- Asclepias simplex (Schltr.) Schltr.; Gomphocarpus revolutus (E.Mey.) D.Dietr.; Gomphocarpus simplex Schltr.; Lagarinthus revolutus E.Mey.

= Asclepias stellifera =

Species of flowering plant from southern Africa

Asclepias stellifera is a flowering plant in the dogbane family, Apocynaceae. It is a perennial herb native to southern Africa, where it occurs in South Africa, Eswatini, and Lesotho.

The species is assessed as Least Concern on the Red List of South African Plants.
