= Asclepias cooperi =

Scientific classification
- Kingdom: Plantae
- Clade: Embryophytes
- Clade: Tracheophytes
- Clade: Spermatophytes
- Clade: Angiosperms
- Clade: Eudicots
- Clade: Asterids
- Order: Gentianales
- Family: Apocynaceae
- Genus: Asclepias
- Species: A. cooperi

Binomial name
- Asclepias cooperi N.E.Br.

Species of plant

Asclepias cooperi, or Cooper's milkweed, is a perennial species of milkweed. It is considered to be rare. This is an endemic species, restricted to South Africa. It occurs in a montane grassland biome at an altitude of between 650 and 1 400 m.

It flowers from mid-December to January with large umbels of yellow flowers.
