= Asclepias bicuspis =

Scientific classification
- Kingdom: Plantae
- Clade: Embryophytes
- Clade: Tracheophytes
- Clade: Angiosperms
- Clade: Eudicots
- Clade: Asterids
- Order: Gentianales
- Family: Apocynaceae
- Genus: Asclepias
- Species: A. bicuspis

Binomial name
- Asclepias bicuspis N.E.Br. 1908

Species of flowering plant

Asclepias bicuspis, once thought to be extinct, is a species of perennial milkweed endemic to KwaZulu-Natal, South Africa. Asclepias is named after the Greek god Aesculapius as the god of medicine. The specific species name bicuspis refers to the two long, thread-like corona lobes.

== Habitat ==
A. bicuspis grows as a subshrub in the subtropical biome. A.bicuspis is small (up to 25 cm). The root tuber is deep. Overall, it is a single-stemmed and hairy plant. It has 4 to 6 pairs of opposite leaves with the margins curled under. Like other milkweeds, A. biscuspis contains milky latex. It blooms in early summer and in October and November with greenish-yellow, scentless flowers that are part of 5 to 8 flowered umbels. Flowers of A. bicuspis have a wax-like surface. This makes pollination difficult. Flowers face downward to make it less difficult to access the pollenia. Corona lobes guide the insect's foot to the pollenia. After nectar is obtained, the foot of the insect foot pulls pollinia with it. The pollenia are carried to the next flower. A. bicuspis nectar is well sought but specific pollinators of the small flowers are unknown. Plants can be found in firebreaks, annually burnt grasslands, and in well-drained soil. It has never been common, and plants have a scattered distribution in its range.

== Ecology ==
A. biscuspis is considered to be Critically Endangered by the South African National Biodiversity Institute caused by the impact of the construction of the Midmar Dam, cattle farming, afforestation, and urban expansion. The species can only be found in the Endangered KwaZulu-Natal Midlands Mistbelt Grassland. There it grows at an altitude of 1200-1500 m.
