= Asclepias concinna =

Scientific classification
- Kingdom: Plantae
- Clade: Embryophytes
- Clade: Tracheophytes
- Clade: Angiosperms
- Clade: Eudicots
- Clade: Asterids
- Order: Gentianales
- Family: Apocynaceae
- Genus: Asclepias
- Species: A. concinna

Binomial name
- Asclepias concinna Schltr. (1896)

Synonyms
- Gomphocarpus concinnus

Species of flowering plant

Asclepias concinna is a species of critically endangered perennial milkweed that is endemic to South Africa. It grows primarily in the subtropical biome in montane grassland and in annually burnt grassland. It is in the family Apocynaceae.

This is a rare species is only known from a few collections. It was first collected more than 100 years ago. Three subpopulations were found to be within a small area in the Drakensberg foothills and KwaZulu-Natal Midlands. The largest subpopulation was found to be consisting of about 50 plants, while two other subpopulations were found to have about 10 plants each. Other populations may still be identified but most of this species' habitat has been modified and fragmented.
