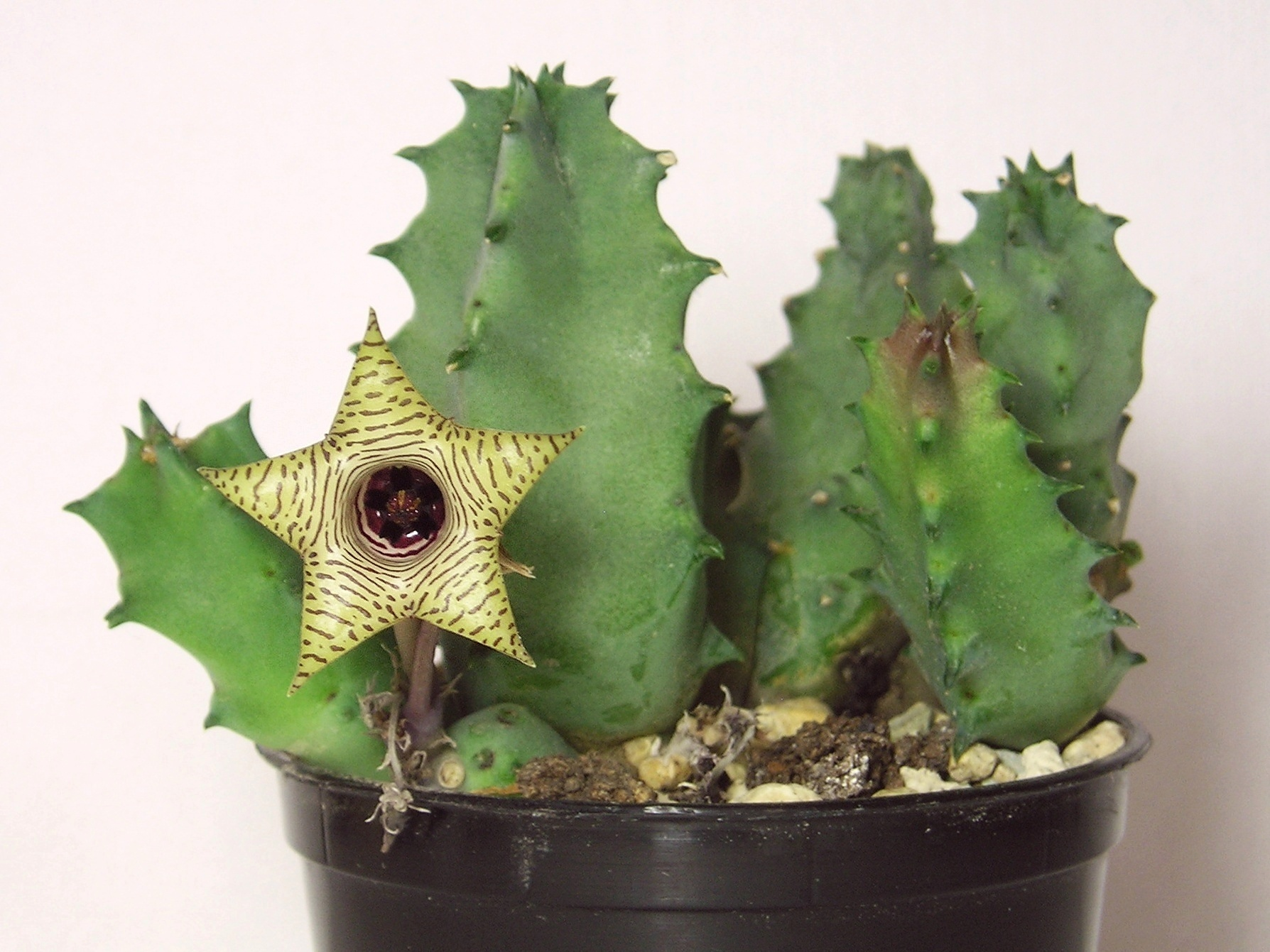
- In bloom
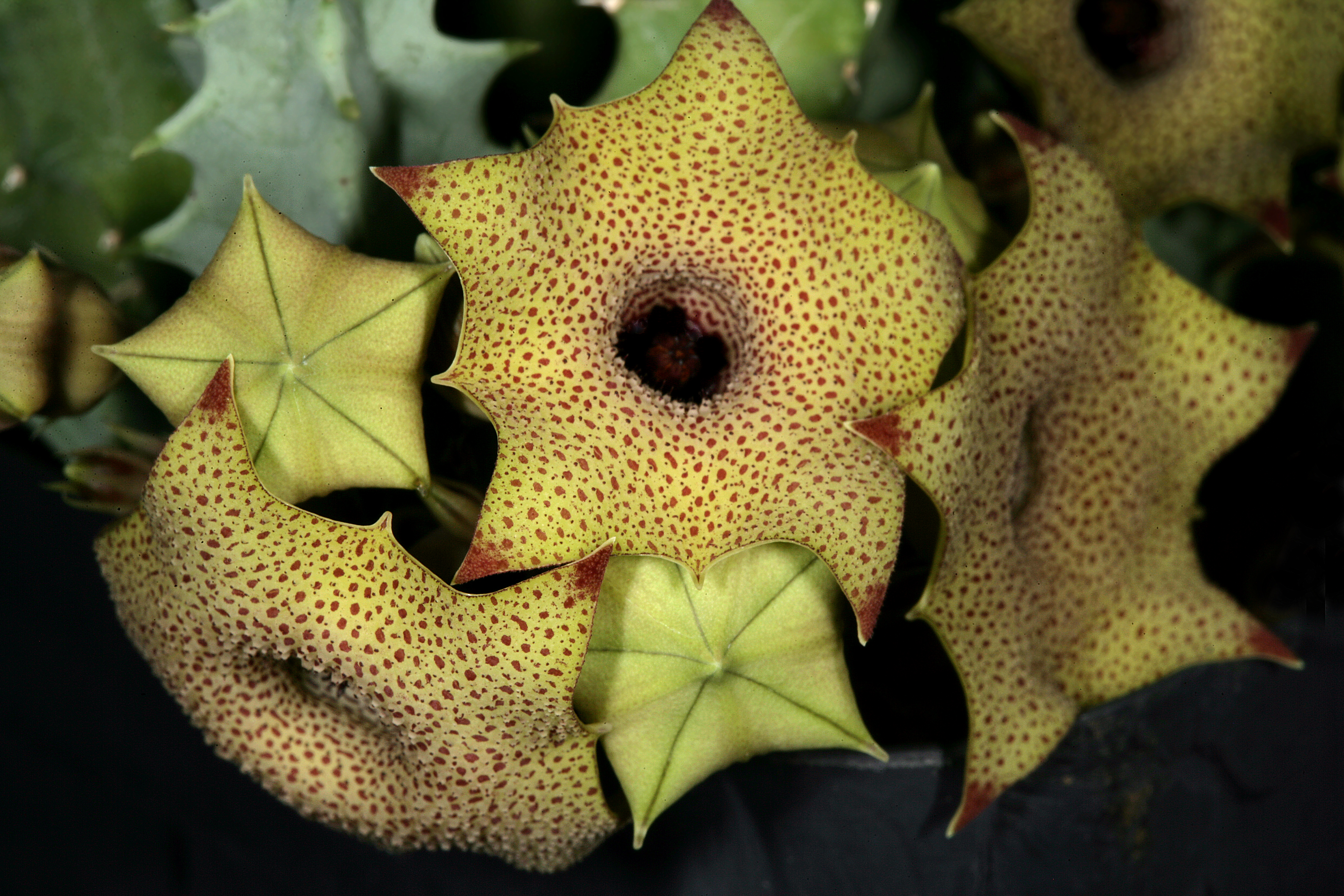
- Individuals may vary in the decorations on their flowers

Scientific classification
- Kingdom: Plantae
- Clade: Embryophytes
- Clade: Tracheophytes
- Clade: Spermatophytes
- Clade: Angiosperms
- Clade: Eudicots
- Clade: Asterids
- Order: Gentianales
- Family: Apocynaceae
- Genus: Huernia
- Species: H. thuretii

Binomial name
- Huernia thuretii J.F.Cels

Synonyms
- List: Ceropegia thuretii (J.F.Cels) Bruyns; Huernia bayeri L.C.Leach; Huernia brevirostris N.E.Br.; Huernia brevirostris subsp. baviaana L.C.Leach; Huernia brevirostris subsp. intermedia (N.E.Br.) L.C.Leach; Huernia inornata Oberm.; Huernia primulina N.E.Br.; Huernia scabra N.E.Br.; Huernia striata Oberm.; Huernia thuretii var. primulina (N.E.Br.) L.C.Leach

= Huernia thuretii =

Species of flowering plant

Huernia thuretii is a species of flowering plant in the family Apocynaceae, native to Namibia and to the Cape Provinces of South Africa. A succulent, as Huernia thurettii it has gained the Royal Horticultural Society's Award of Garden Merit.
