= Asclepias compressidens =

Scientific classification
- Kingdom: Plantae
- Clade: Embryophytes
- Clade: Tracheophytes
- Clade: Spermatophytes
- Clade: Angiosperms
- Clade: Eudicots
- Clade: Asterids
- Order: Gentianales
- Family: Apocynaceae
- Genus: Asclepias
- Species: A. compressidens

Binomial name
- Asclepias compressidens (N.E.Br.) Nicholas

Synonyms
- Asclepias navicularis var. compressidens

Species of flowering plant

Asclepias compressidens is a species of perennial milkweed that is considered to be rare. This species is endemic to South Africa. It grows primarily in the subtropical biome. It is in the family Apocynaceae.
