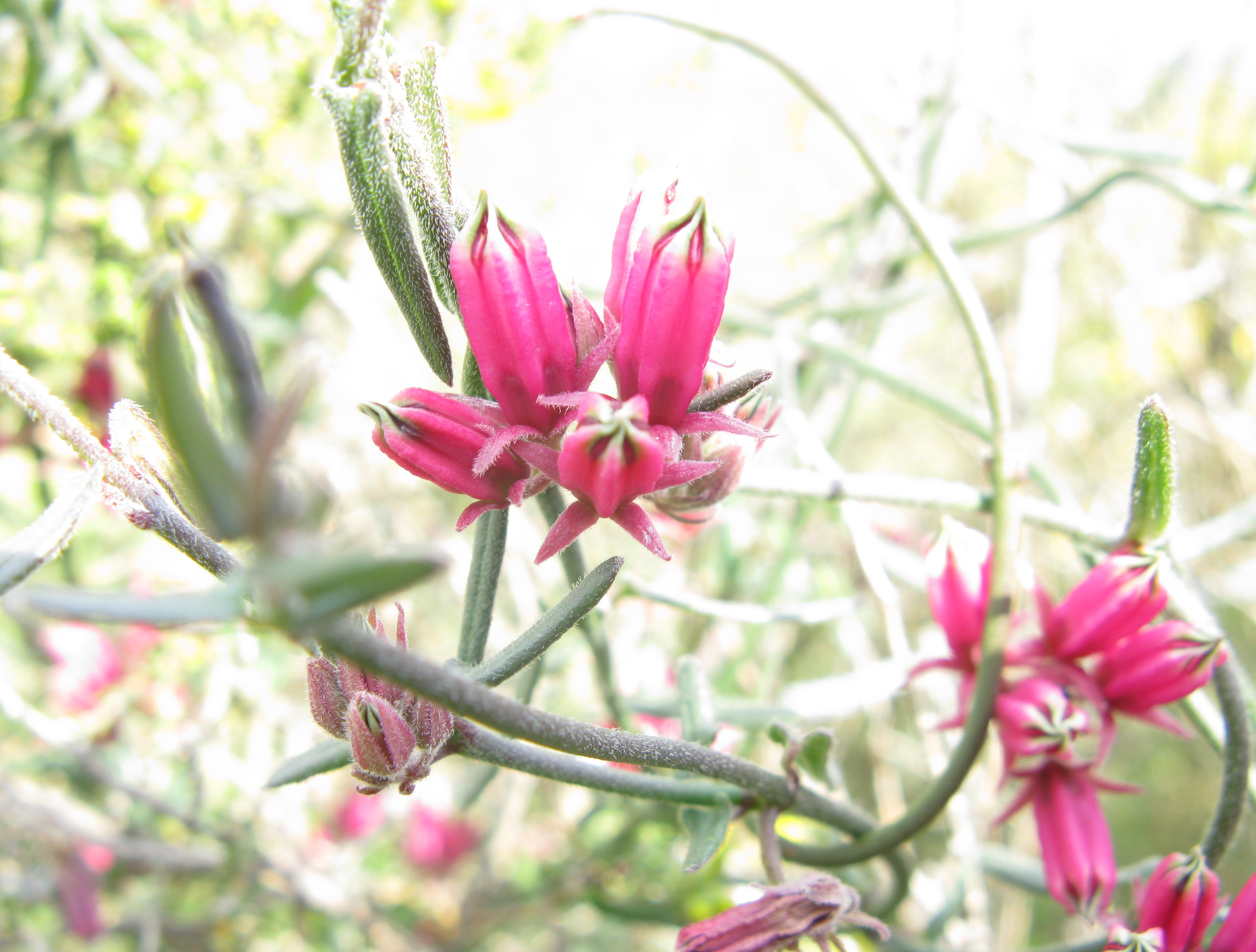

Scientific classification
- Kingdom: Plantae
- Clade: Tracheophytes
- Clade: Angiosperms
- Clade: Eudicots
- Clade: Asterids
- Order: Gentianales
- Family: Apocynaceae
- Genus: Microloma
- Species: M. sagittatum

Binomial name
- Microloma sagittatum (L.) R.Br.

= Microloma sagittatum =

Species of plant

Microloma sagittatum, the bokhoring, is a species of plant in the family Apocynaceae, that is native to the south-western Cape, South Africa.

== Description ==
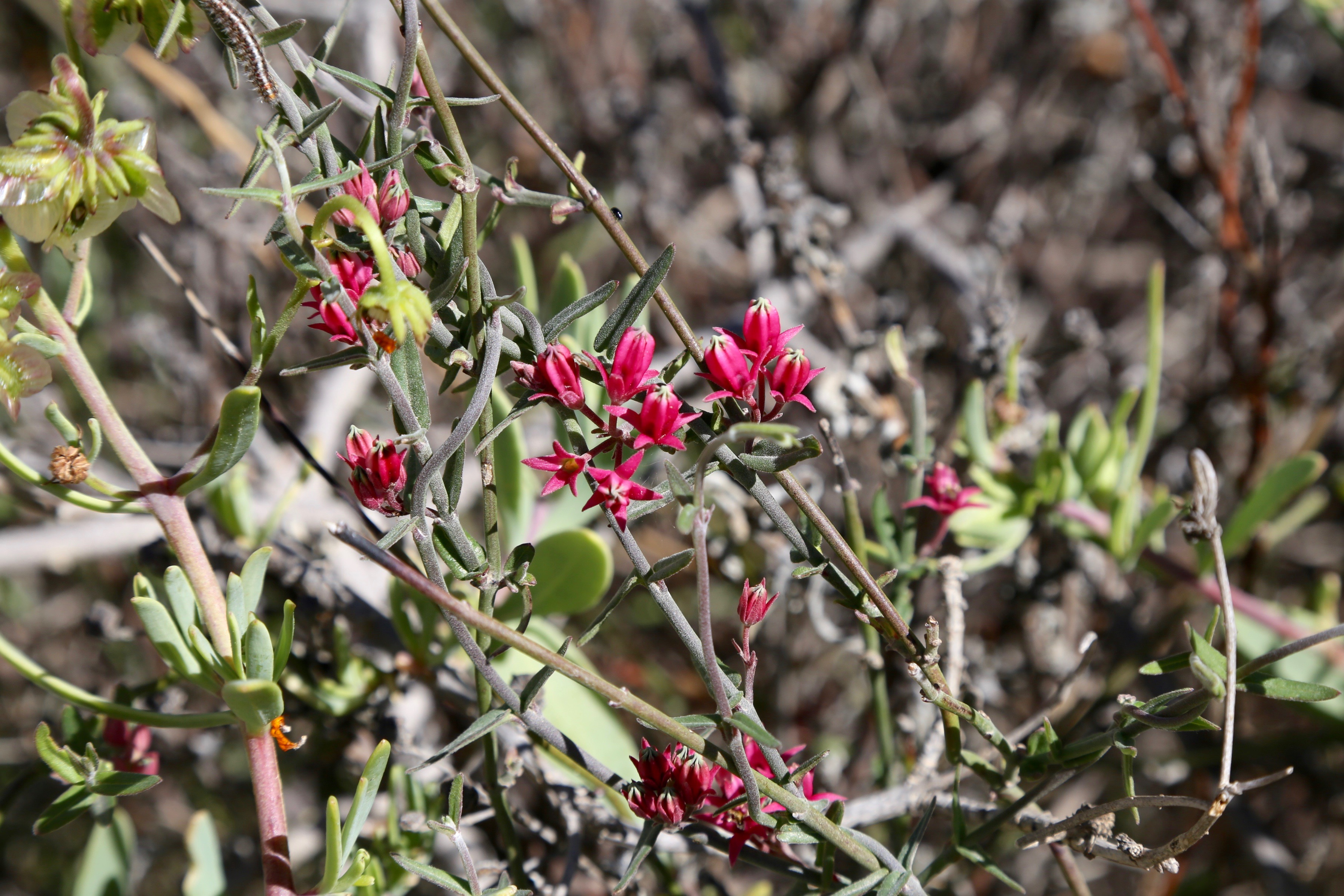
Growth form showing flowers, stems and leaves

Like other Microloma species, this is a thin climbing plant. However this species has velvety leaves that are slightly arrow-shaped and have margins that slightly curve under.

The distinctive pink flowers have sepals that spread outwards, and a central, green pointed column. The flowers appear in winter and spring.

== Distribution ==
This species usually occurs in the far western part of South Africa, throughout most of the predominantly winter-rainfall Western Cape Province, with its range also extending into the westernmost part of the Northern Cape Province.
