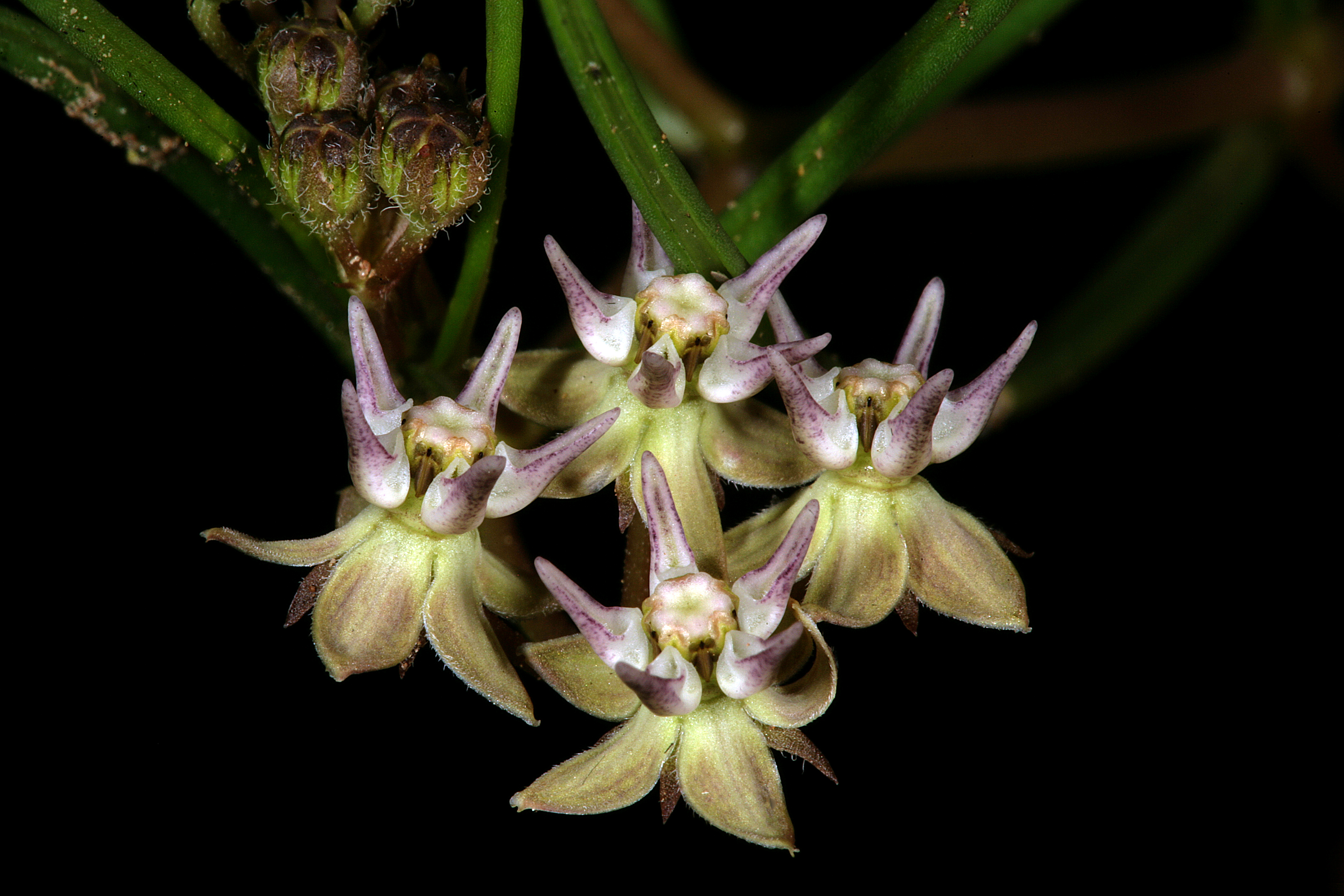

Scientific classification
- Kingdom: Plantae
- Clade: Embryophytes
- Clade: Tracheophytes
- Clade: Angiosperms
- Clade: Eudicots
- Clade: Asterids
- Order: Gentianales
- Family: Apocynaceae
- Genus: Asclepias
- Species: A. brevipes

Binomial name
- Asclepias brevipes (Schltr.) Schltr.

Synonyms
- Gomphocarpus brevipes

= Asclepias brevipes =

Species of flowering plant

Asclepias brevipes, the northern meadow-star or bokhorinkie, is a species of perennial milkweed that is endemic to South Africa. It grows primarily in the subtropical biome. It is in the family Apocynaceae.
