= Hoodia flava =

Scientific classification
- Kingdom: Plantae
- Clade: Tracheophytes
- Clade: Angiosperms
- Clade: Eudicots
- Clade: Asterids
- Order: Gentianales
- Family: Apocynaceae
- Genus: Hoodia
- Species: H. flava

Binomial name
- Hoodia flava (N.E.Br.) Plowes

Species of succulent

Hoodia flava is a succulent native to the Cape Province in South Africa and to Namibia. It has a unique pattern of distribution, growing inside bushes or on gravelly slopes and hills. It is commonly known as ghaap or yellow-flowered ghaap in the Afrikaans language.

== Description ==
Leafless and branchless, H. flava grows as cylindrical green stems up to 6 inches in height and 2 inches in diameter, with 20-30 longitudinal ribs of mammillae, each one featuring a thin, brown spine on its crest. Yellow flowers appear in winter on the youngest parts of the plants near the top.

== Cultivation ==
This plant should be watered during its growing season and then sparsely otherwise.
