= Asclepias ameliae =

Scientific classification
- Kingdom: Plantae
- Clade: Tracheophytes
- Clade: Angiosperms
- Clade: Eudicots
- Clade: Asterids
- Order: Gentianales
- Family: Apocynaceae
- Genus: Asclepias
- Species: A. ameliae

Binomial name
- Asclepias ameliae S.Moore

Synonyms
- Asclepias pulchella; Gomphocarpus pulchellus; Trachycalymma pulchellum

Species of flowering plant

Asclepias ameliae is a species of perennial milkweed endemic to The Democratic Republic of Congo, Zambia to Angola. It grows in the seasonally dry tropical biome open, mixed woodlands and occasionally seasonally wet grasslands at elevations of 1200 - 1500 m. It is in the family Apocynaceae. It is named after Forte Princeza Amelia, near where the type specimen was found.
