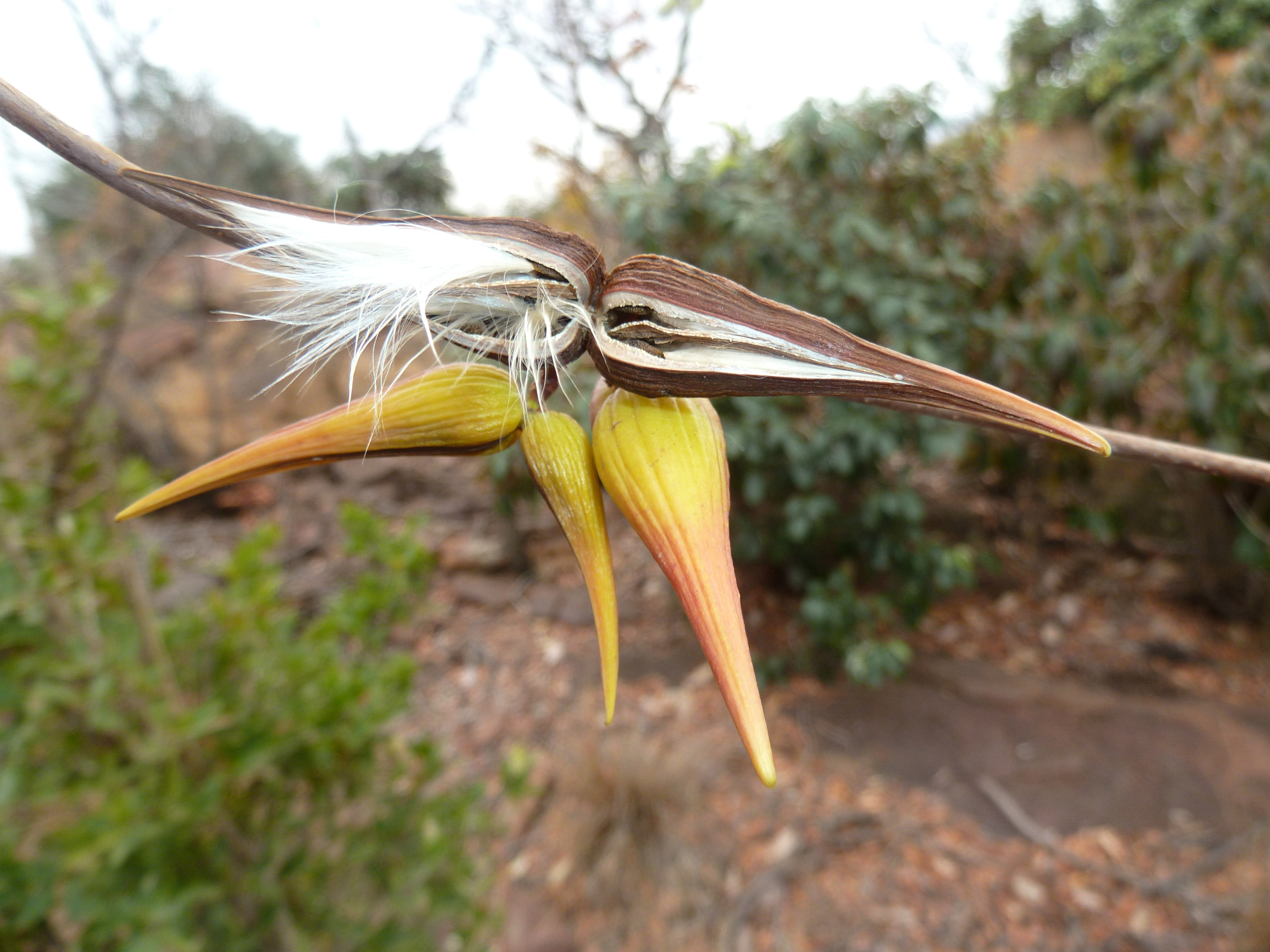
- Fruit and seeds

Scientific classification
- Kingdom: Plantae
- Clade: Tracheophytes
- Clade: Angiosperms
- Clade: Eudicots
- Clade: Asterids
- Order: Gentianales
- Family: Apocynaceae
- Genus: Cryptolepis
- Species: C. cryptolepioides

Binomial name
- Cryptolepis cryptolepioides (Schltr.) Bullock

Synonyms
- Ectadiopsis buettneri K.Schum.; Ectadiopsis cryptolepioides Schltr. (basionym)

= Cryptolepis cryptolepioides =

Species of plant

Cryptolepis cryptolepioides is a species of flowering plant in the family Apocynaceae. It is a twining climber in shrubs and trees, and is native to rocky hillsides and escarpments in northern South Africa and Zimbabwe.
