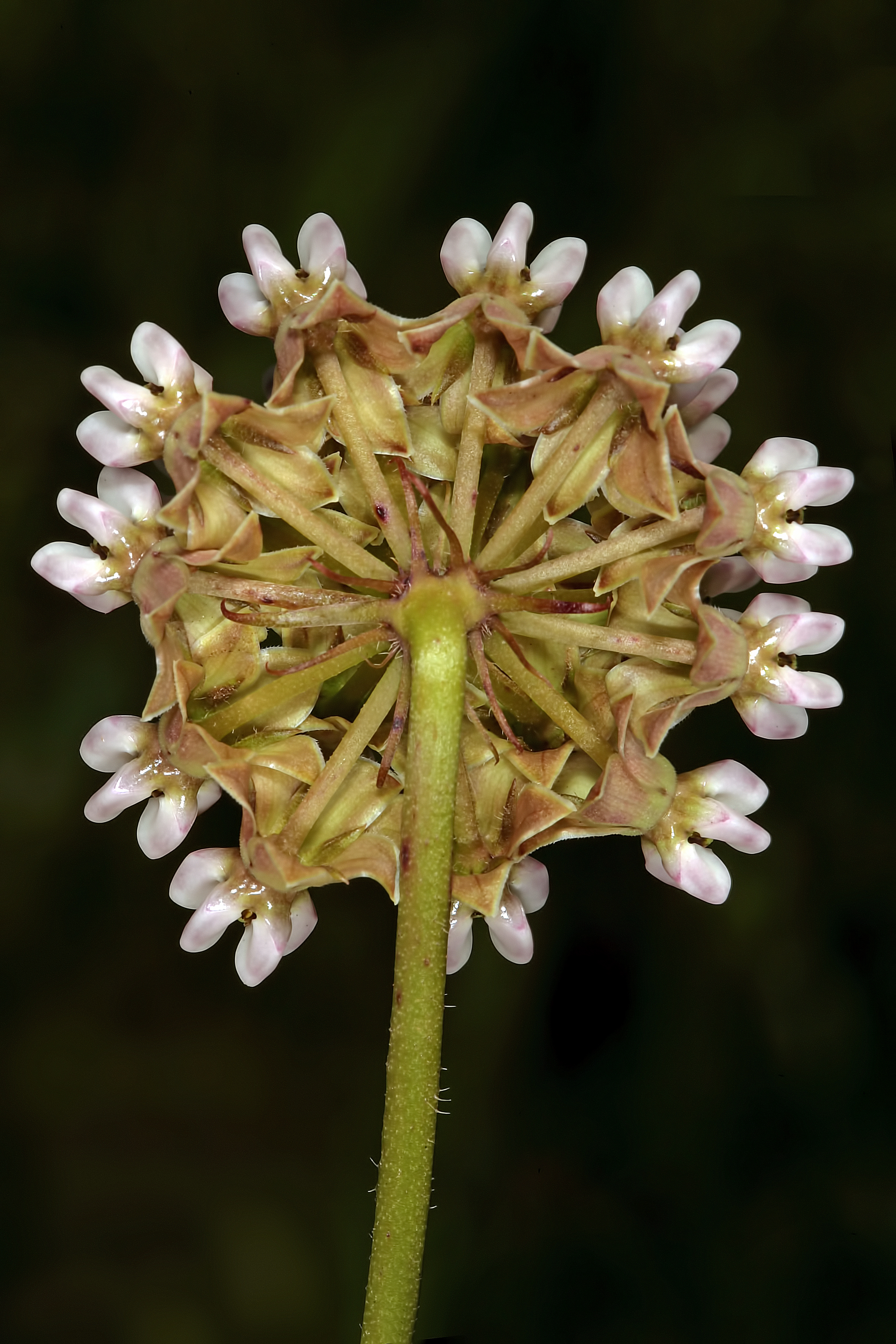

Scientific classification
- Kingdom: Plantae
- Clade: Embryophytes
- Clade: Tracheophytes
- Clade: Spermatophytes
- Clade: Angiosperms
- Clade: Eudicots
- Clade: Asterids
- Order: Gentianales
- Family: Apocynaceae
- Genus: Asclepias
- Species: A. adscendens

Binomial name
- Asclepias adscendens (Schltr.) Schltr. (1896)

Synonyms
- Gomphocarpus adscendens

= Asclepias adscendens =

Species of flowering plant

Asclepias adscendens is a species of perennial milkweed endemic to eastern Zimbabwe, Lesotho, Mozambique, and South Africa. It grows in the subtropical biome. It is in the family Apocynaceae.
