= Ephippiocarpa =

Scientific classification
- Kingdom: Plantae
- Clade: Tracheophytes
- Clade: Angiosperms
- Clade: Eudicots
- Clade: Asterids
- Order: Gentianales
- Family: Apocynaceae
- Genus: Ephippiocarpa; Markgr.

Genus of plants

Ephippiocarpa is a genus of flowering plants belonging to the family Apocynaceae.

Its native range is Southern Somalia to Southern Africa.

Species:

- Ephippiocarpa humilis (Chiov.) Boiteau
- Ephippiocarpa orientalis (S.Moore) Markgr.
