= Hoodia triebneri =

Conservation status
- Least Concern (IUCN 3.1)

Scientific classification
- Kingdom: Plantae
- Clade: Tracheophytes
- Clade: Angiosperms
- Clade: Eudicots
- Clade: Asterids
- Order: Gentianales
- Family: Apocynaceae
- Genus: Hoodia
- Species: H. triebneri

Binomial name
- Hoodia triebneri (Nel) Bruyns

Species of plant

Hoodia triebneri is a species of plant in the family Apocynaceae. It is endemic to Namibia. Its natural habitat is rocky areas, especially underneath Acacia trees and below ridges.

== Description ==
Hoodia triebneri is shrub-like, growing up to 0.3 meters tall and half a meter wide. It has about ten to thirty erect, slender stems with strong spines. Flowers are very small, 1 to 1.5 centimeters in diameter and nearly black or dark maroon in color. The flowers grow in clusters of 4 to 10 each and are foul-smelling.
