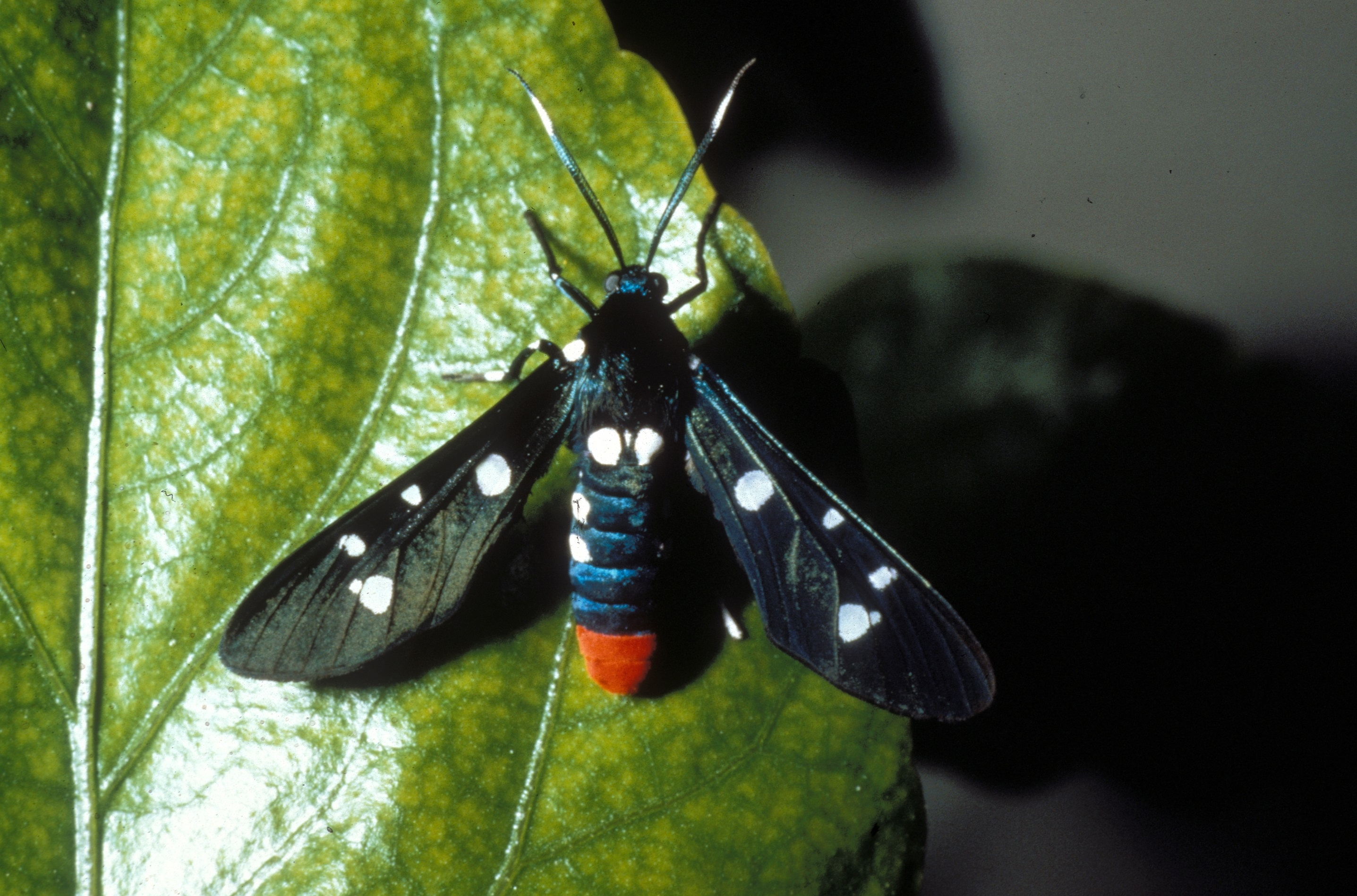
- Syntomeida epilais

Scientific classification
- Kingdom: Animalia
- Phylum: Arthropoda
- Clade: Pancrustacea
- Class: Insecta
- Order: Lepidoptera
- Superfamily: Noctuoidea
- Family: Erebidae
- Subfamily: Arctiinae
- Subtribe: Euchromiina
- Genus: Syntomeida; Harris, 1839

Synonyms
- Hippola Walker, 1854

= Syntomeida =

Genus of moths

Syntomeida is a genus of tiger moths in the family Erebidae.

== Species ==
- Syntomeida austera Dognin, 1902
- Syntomeida epilais (Walker, 1854) – polka-dot wasp moth
- Syntomeida ipomoeae (Harris, 1839) – yellow-banded wasp moth
- Syntomeida melanthus (Cramer, [1779]) – black-banded wasp moth
- Syntomeida paramalanthus Forster, 1949
- Syntomeida syntomoides (Boisduval, 1836)
- Syntomeida tibaracoana Álvarez, Núñez & Gallardo-Capó 2025
- Syntomeida vidua (Ménétriés, 1857)
- Syntomeida vulcana Druce, 1889
- Syntomeida wrighti (Gundlach, 1881)

Else see Phoenicoprocta for former:

- Syntomeida hampsonii Barnes, 1904
- Syntomeida joda Druce, 1897
- Syntomeida venadia Schaus, 1920
