= Syntomeida wrighti =

Scientific classification
- Kingdom: Animalia
- Phylum: Arthropoda
- Class: Insecta
- Order: Lepidoptera
- Superfamily: Noctuoidea
- Family: Erebidae
- Subfamily: Arctiinae
- Genus: Syntomeida
- Species: S. wrighti

Binomial name
- Syntomeida wrighti (Gundlach, 1881)

Synonyms
- Hippola wrighti Gundlach, 1881; Eurota parishi Rothschild, 1911

Species of moth

Syntomeida wrighti is a moth in the subfamily Arctiinae. It was first described by Juan Gundlach in 1881 and is found on Cuba.

== Taxonomy ==
The species was previously incorrectly synonymized with Syntomeida syntomoides.
