= Phoenicoprocta rubiventer =

Scientific classification
- Kingdom: Animalia
- Phylum: Arthropoda
- Class: Insecta
- Order: Lepidoptera
- Superfamily: Noctuoidea
- Family: Erebidae
- Subfamily: Arctiinae
- Genus: Phoenicoprocta
- Species: P. rubiventer

Binomial name
- Phoenicoprocta rubiventer Hampson, 1898

Species of moth

Phoenicoprocta rubiventer is a moth in the subfamily Arctiinae. It was described by George Hampson in 1898. It is found in Panama.

The LepIndex catalogue lists this as a synonym for Phoenicoprocta insperata Walker, 1856, along with P. astrifera Butler, 1877, P. rubriventris amazonica Zerny, 1931, and P. intermedia Forster, 1949, though there is no indication as to who published this synonymy.
