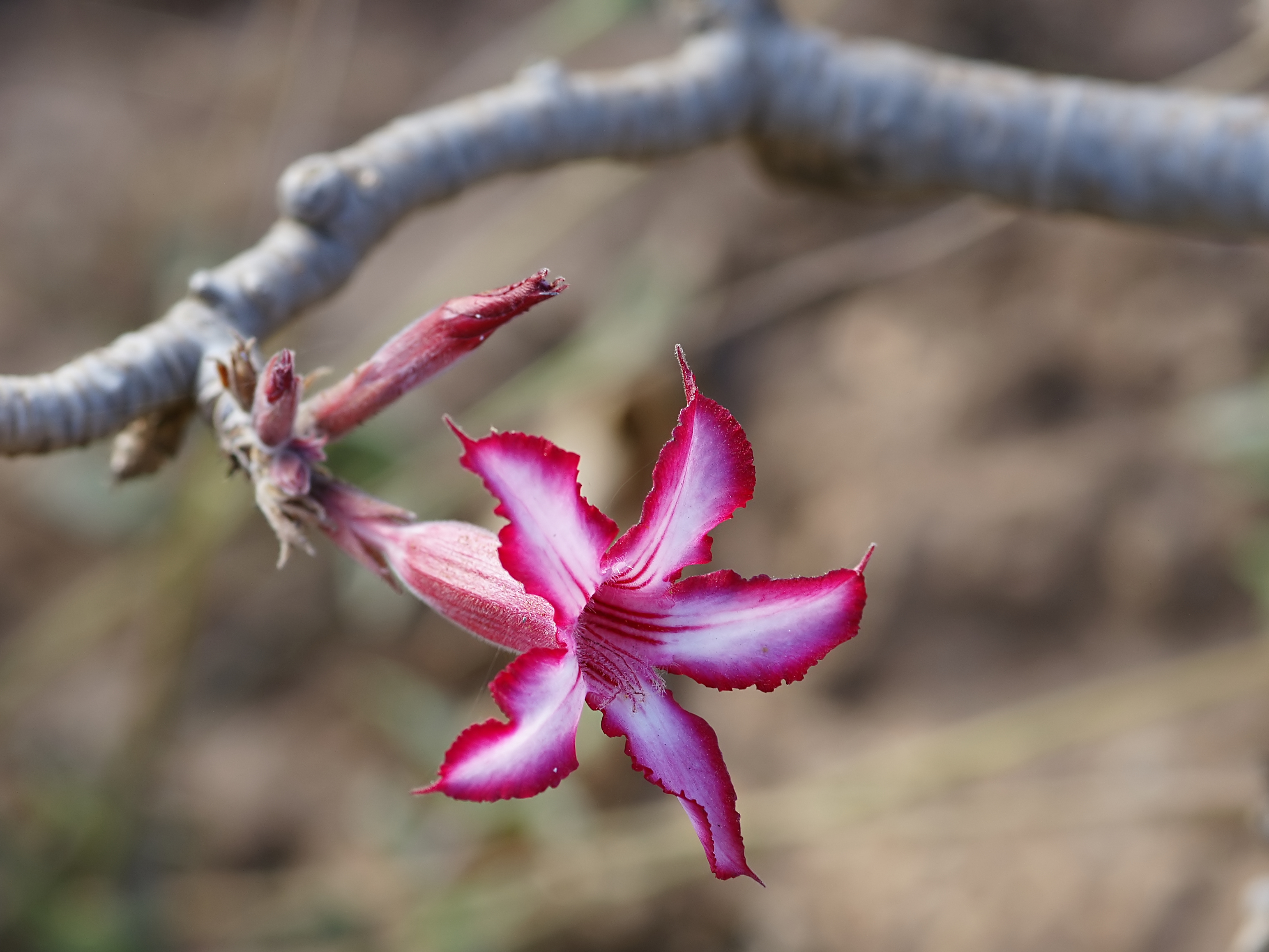
- Adenium multiflorum in cultivation at the University of California Botanical Garden.

Scientific classification
- Kingdom: Plantae
- Clade: Tracheophytes
- Clade: Angiosperms
- Clade: Eudicots
- Clade: Asterids
- Order: Gentianales
- Family: Apocynaceae
- Genus: Adenium
- Species: A. multiflorum

Binomial name
- Adenium multiflorum Klotzsch.

= Adenium multiflorum =

Sabi star

Species of plant

Adenium multiflorum is small, succulent tree native to central and eastern Southern Africa. It may be deciduous or evergreen, and is found in dry woods or grassland in its native habitat. It is typically 0.5–3 m tall. Like other succulent members of the family Apocynaceae, A. multiflorum has a milky latex with toxic alkaloids, specifically Cardiac glycosides. This latex is used as an arrow poison and as a fish stunning poison.

The leaves are simple, with smooth edges, typically oppositely arranged. The flowers, which appear in winter, are typically 5-petaled and may be red, pink, white, or bi-color. The two-capsuled fruits contain long, grooved, hairy brown seeds.

Sometimes called the impala lily, A. multiflorum requires full sun and excellent drainage. It is extremely drought tolerant, but susceptible to the tobacco whitefly. Though frequently used as a bonsai plant indoors, it may be grown outside in USDA hardiness zones 10 and 11.

It is sometimes treated as a variety or subspecies of Adenium obesum.
