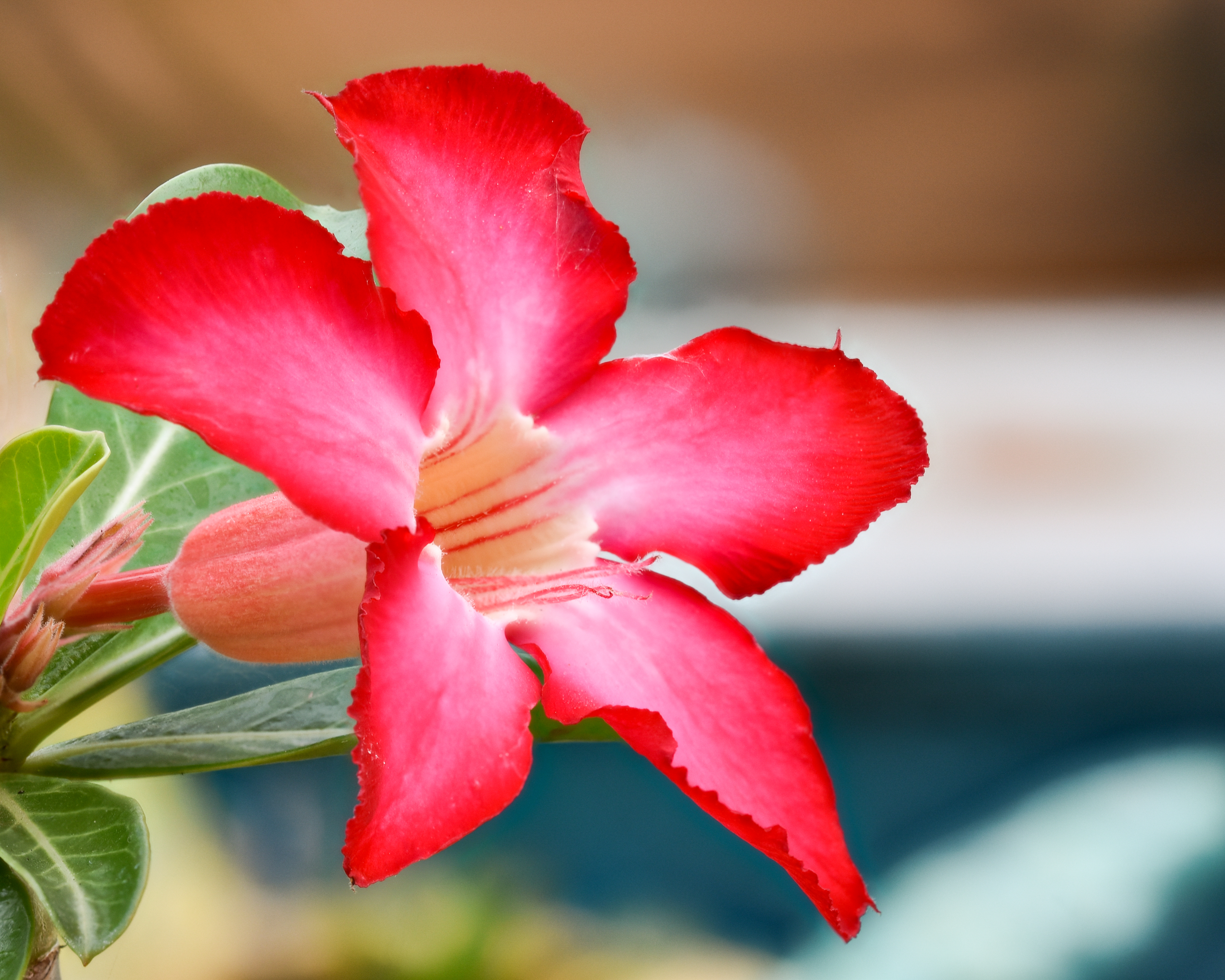

Conservation status
- Least Concern (IUCN 3.1)

Scientific classification
- Kingdom: Plantae
- Clade: Tracheophytes
- Clade: Angiosperms
- Clade: Eudicots
- Clade: Asterids
- Order: Gentianales
- Family: Apocynaceae
- Genus: Adenium
- Species: A. obesum

Binomial name
- Adenium obesum (Forssk.) Roem. & Schult.

Subspecies
- See text

Synonyms
- Adenium coetaneum Stapf; Adenium honghel A.DC. Nerium obesum Forssk.

= Adenium obesum =

Adenium obesum (Desert rose)

Species of plant

Adenium obesum, more commonly known as a desert rose, is a poisonous species of flowering plant belonging to the tribe Nerieae of the subfamily Apocynoideae of the dogbane family, Apocynaceae. It is native to the Sahel regions south of the Sahara (from Mauritania and Senegal to Sudan), tropical and subtropical eastern and southern Africa, as well as the Arabian Peninsula. Other names for the flower include Sabi star, kudu, mock azalea, and impala lily. Adenium obesum is a popular houseplant and bonsai in temperate regions.

== Description ==
It is an evergreen or drought-deciduous succulent shrub (which can also lose its leaves during cold spells, or according to the subspecies or cultivar). It can grow to 0.12–5 m (0.39–16.40 ft) in height, with pachycaul (disproportionately large) stems and a stout, swollen basal caudex (a rootstock that protrudes from the soil). The leaves are spirally arranged, clustered toward the tips of the shoots, simple entire, leathery in texture, 5–15 cm (2.0–5.9 in) long and 1–8 cm (0.39–3.15 in) broad. The flowers are tubular, 2–5 cm (0.79–1.97 in) long, with the outer portion 4–6 cm (1.6–2.4 in) diameter with five petals, resembling those of other related genera such as Plumeria and Nerium. The flowers tend to be red and pink, often with a whitish blush outward of the throat.

== Taxonomy ==
Some taxonomies consider some other species in the genus to be subspecies of Adenium obesum.

=== Subspecies ===
- Adenium obesum subsp. oleifolium (South Africa, Botswana)
- Adenium obesum subsp. socotranum (Socotra)
- Adenium obesum subsp. somalense (Eastern Africa)
- Adenium obesum subsp. swazicum (Eswatini, South Africa)
- Adenium obesum subsp. Arabicum (Saudi Arabia, Yemen)

Adenium swazicum is a critically endangered African species native to Eswatini and Mozambique, growing up to 0.7 metres (2 ft 4 in) tall.

Adenium somalense is also native to Africa, inhabiting Tanzania, Kenya, and Somalia, and reaching heights of 5 metres (16 ft), which makes it the largest of these four subspecies.

Adenium socotranum is native exclusively to the island of Socotra, and can grow to be 4.6 metres (15 ft), but despite its small range, it is of least concern regarding endangerment. It can swell up to 8 feet (2.4 m) in diameter at the base.

Adenium oleifolium is near threatened in the wild and is the smallest of these subspecies, growing at the tallest to 0.4 metres (1 ft 4 in).

Adenium Arabicum a species is a monoecious and self-sterile, common names include desert rose, elephant's foot, and Adan bush, arabicum is native to Saudi Arabia and Yemen.

== Ecology ==
Caterpillars of the polka-dot wasp moth (Syntomeida epilais) are known to feed on the desert rose, along with feeding on oleanders.

In areas with year-round warm weather, they can bloom throughout the year.

== Uses ==
Adenium obesum produces a sap in its roots and stems that contains cardiac glycosides. This sap is used as arrow poison for hunting large game throughout much of Africa and as a fish toxin.

== Cultivation ==
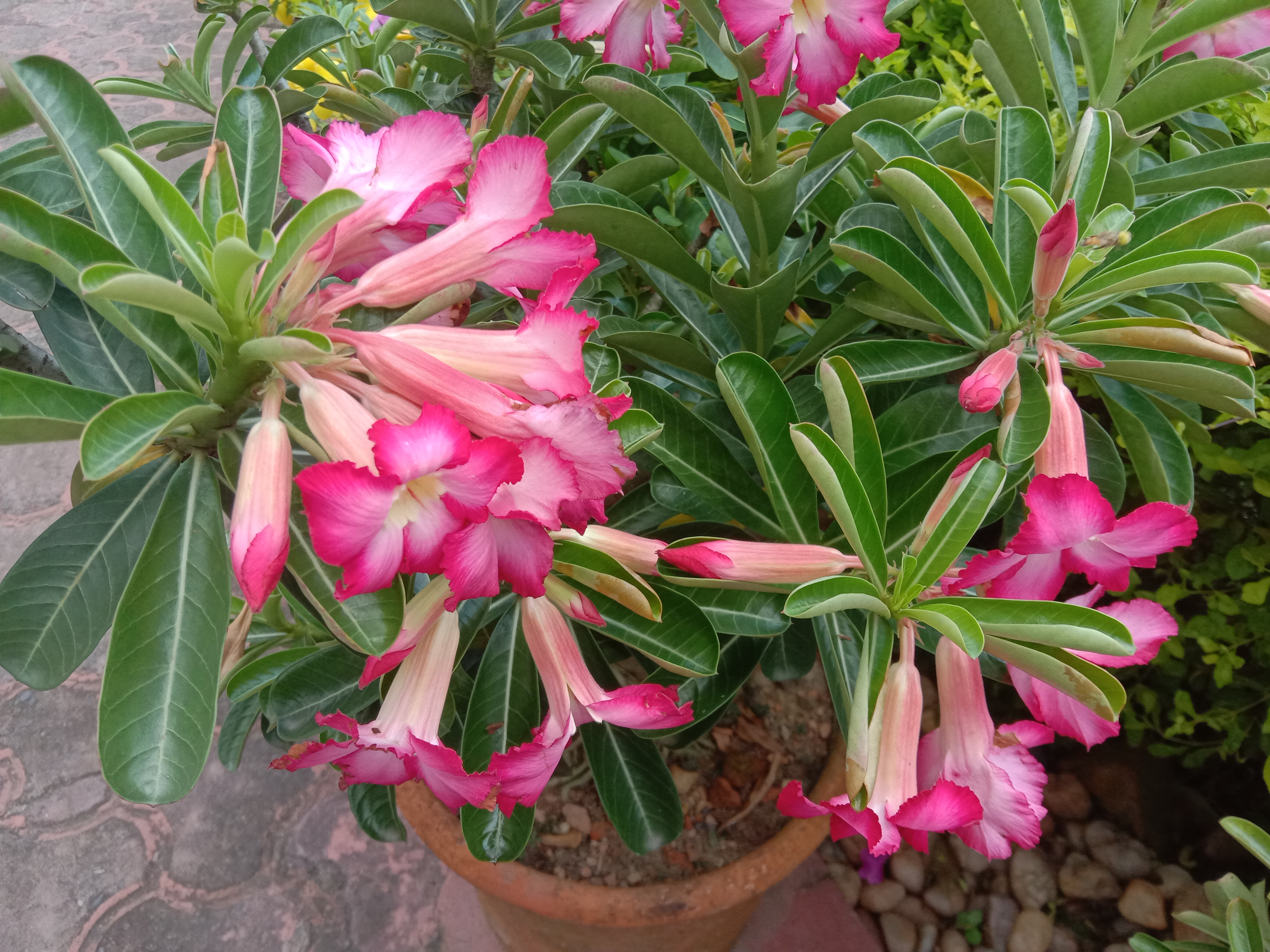
Flowers of Adenium obesum in West Bengal, India.

Adenium obesum is a popular houseplant and bonsai in temperate regions. It requires a sunny location and a minimum indoor temperature in winter of 10 °C (50 °F). It thrives on a xeric watering regime as required by cacti. A. obesum is typically propagated by seed or stem cuttings. The numerous hybrids are propagated mainly by grafting on to seedling rootstock. While plants grown from seed are more likely to have the swollen caudex at a young age, with time many cutting-grown plants cannot be distinguished from seed-grown plants. Like many plants, Adenium obesum can also be propagated in vitro using plant tissue culture.

This plant has gained the Royal Horticultural Society's Award of Garden Merit.

== Symbolic and cultural references ==
The species has been depicted on postage stamps issued by various countries.

== See also ==
- List of poisonous plants
- Pachypodium - another caudiciform member of the Apocynaceae

== Gallery ==
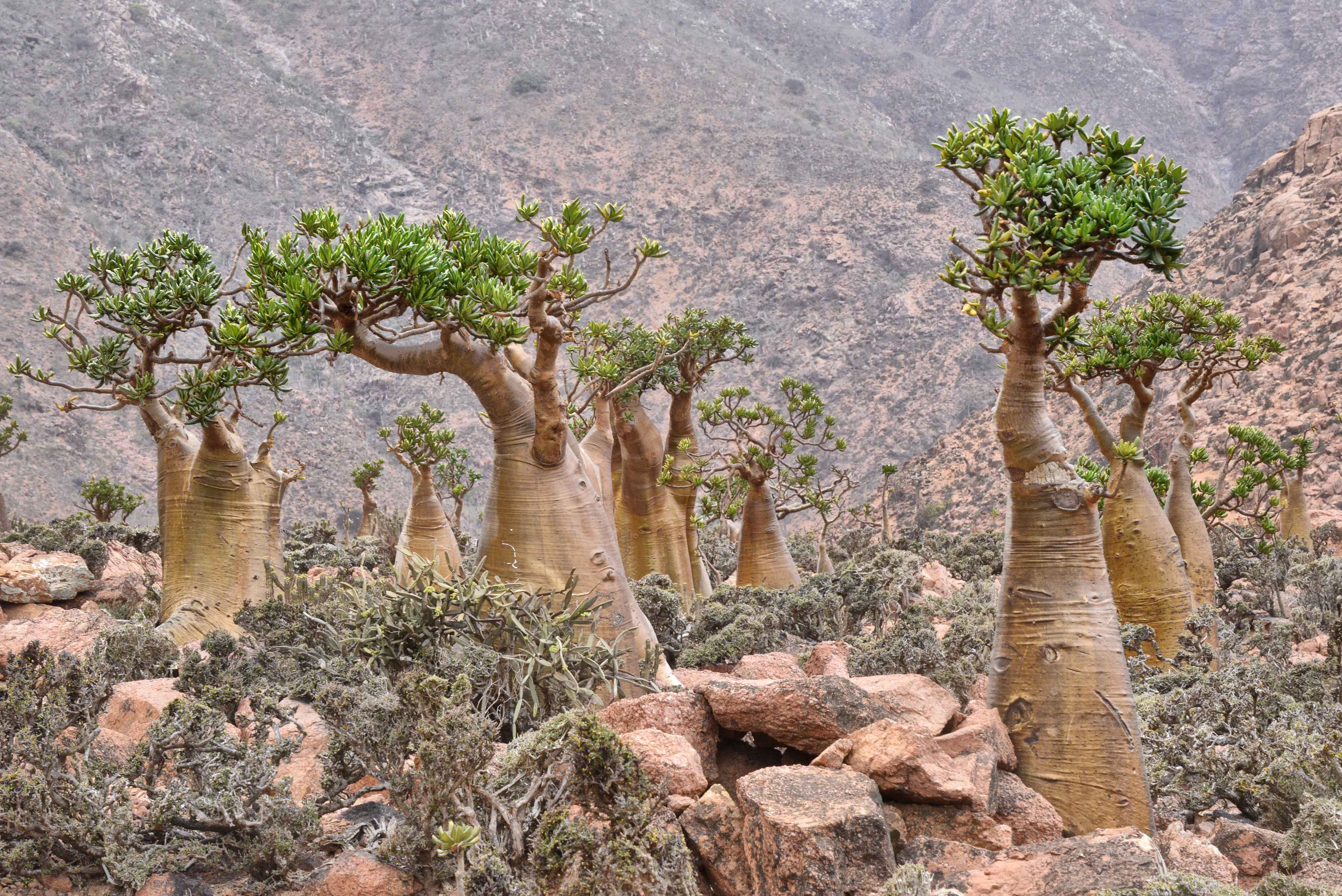
Close-up of stand of A. obesum var. socotranum, Socotra

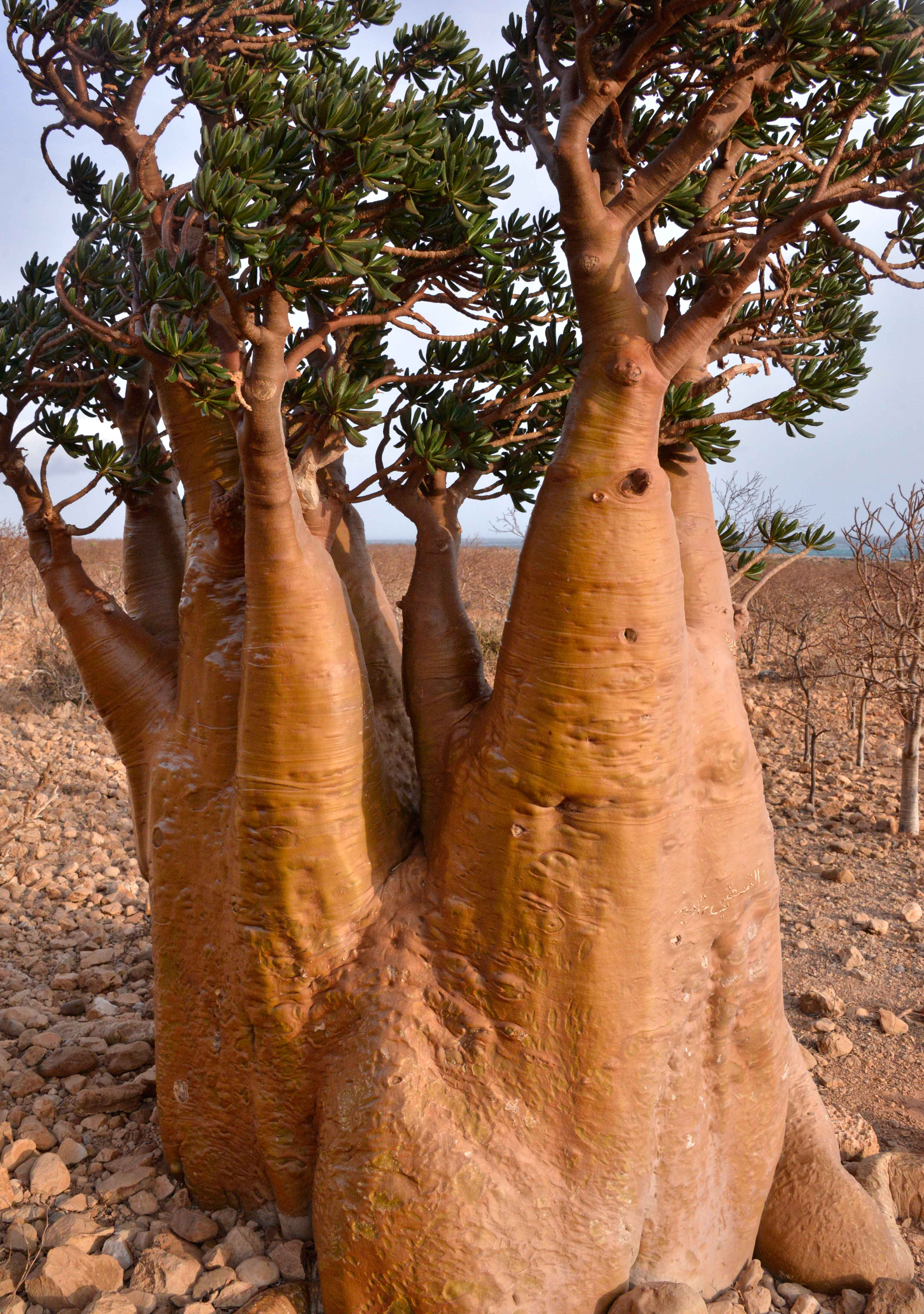
A. obesum var. socotranum, trunk of single extreme pachycaul specimen, Socotra

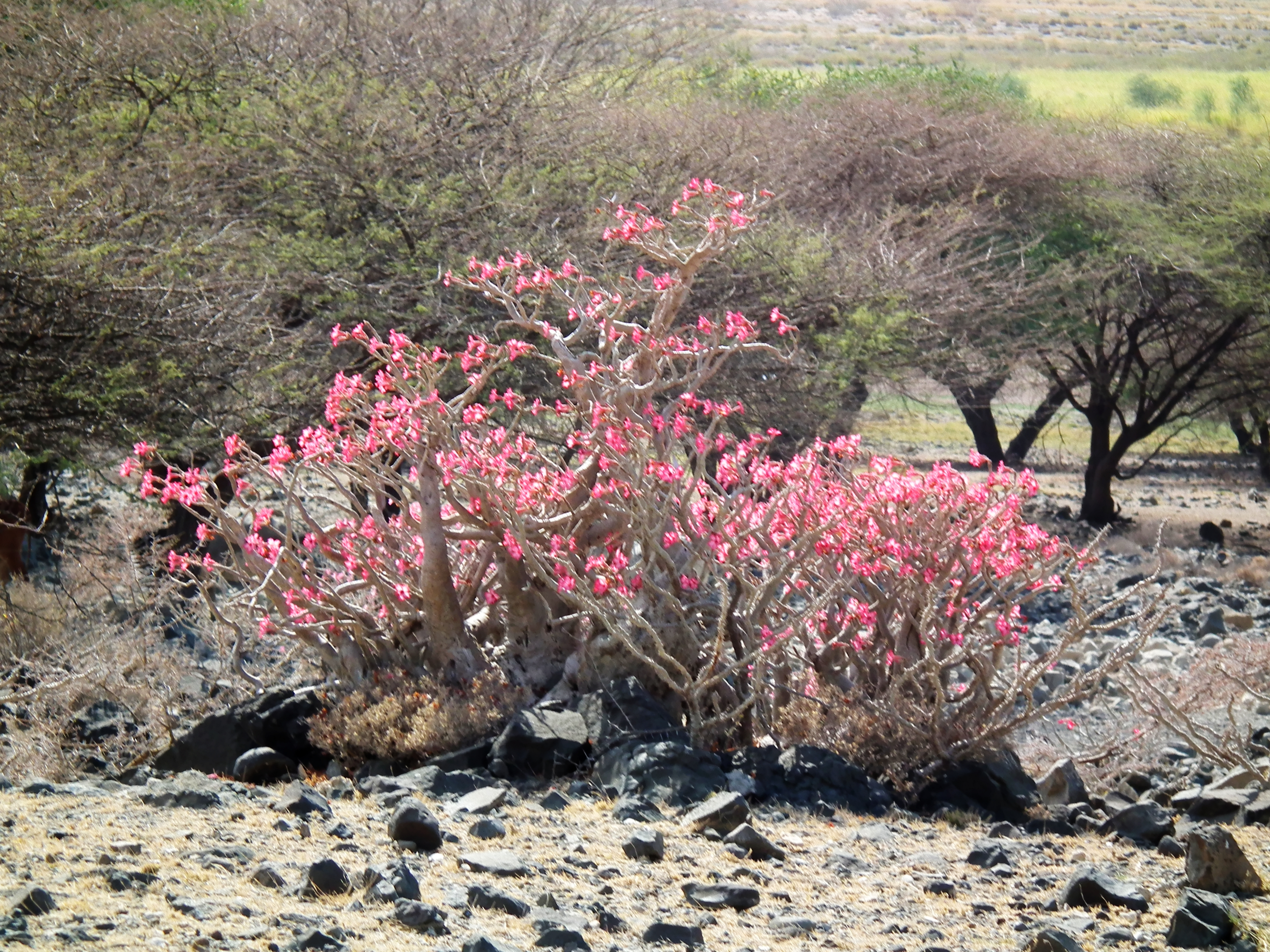
Group of plants growing in scrubland, Tanzania

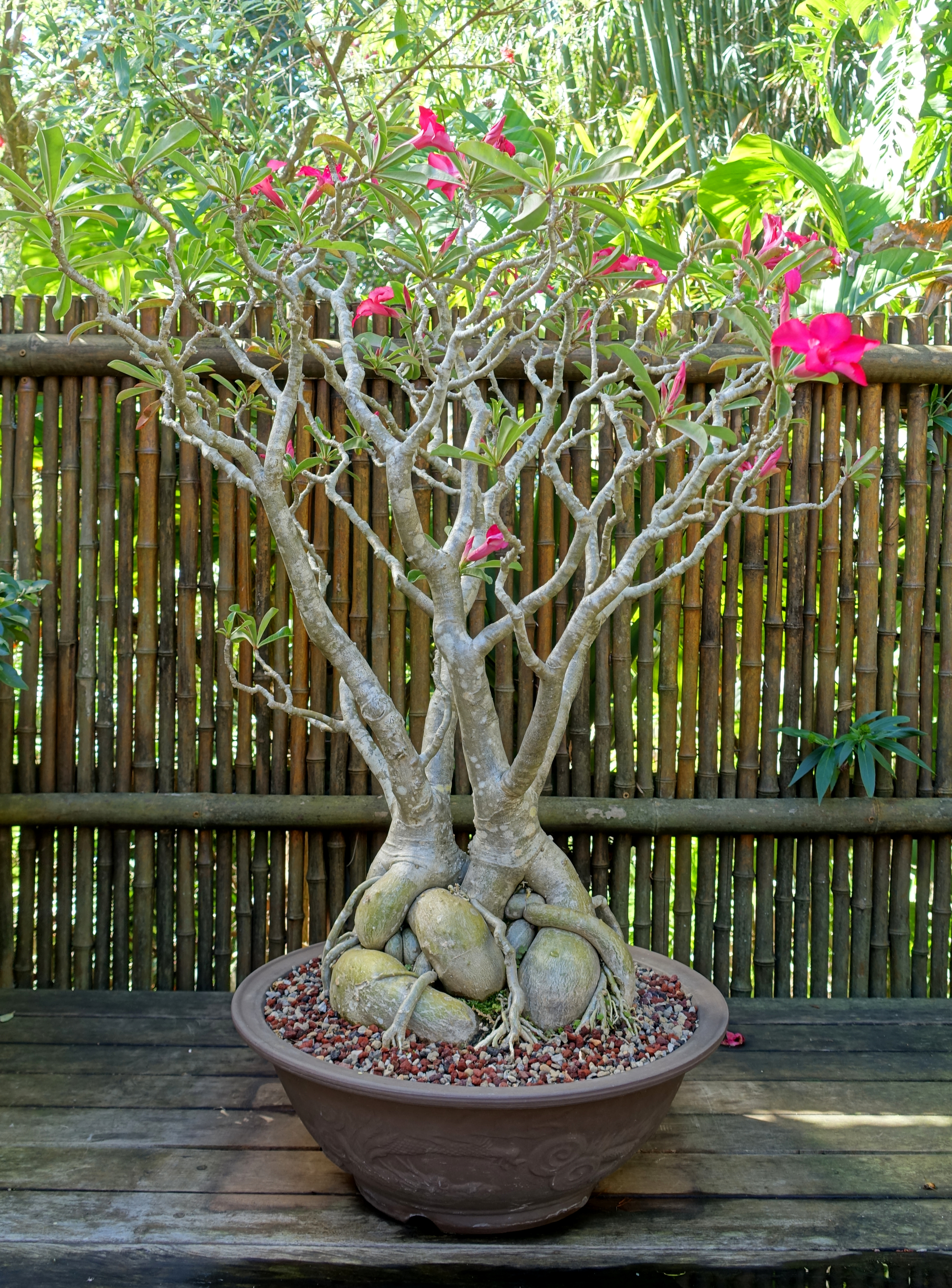
Cultivated bonsai specimen with picturesquely contorted caudex and roots, Florida

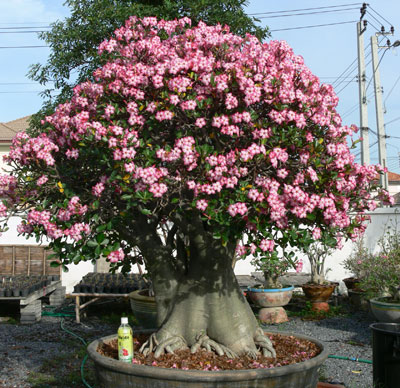
Cultivated specimen in Thailand flowering profusely.

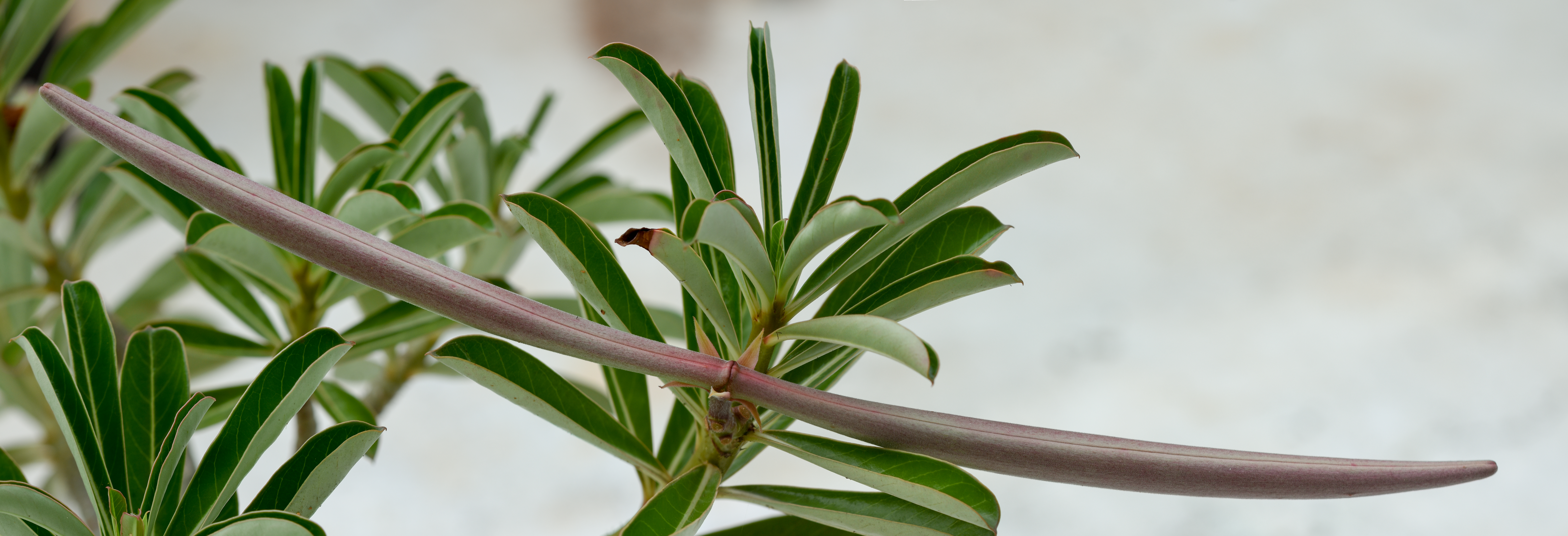
Large fruits on 30-cm tall plant, Chennai.

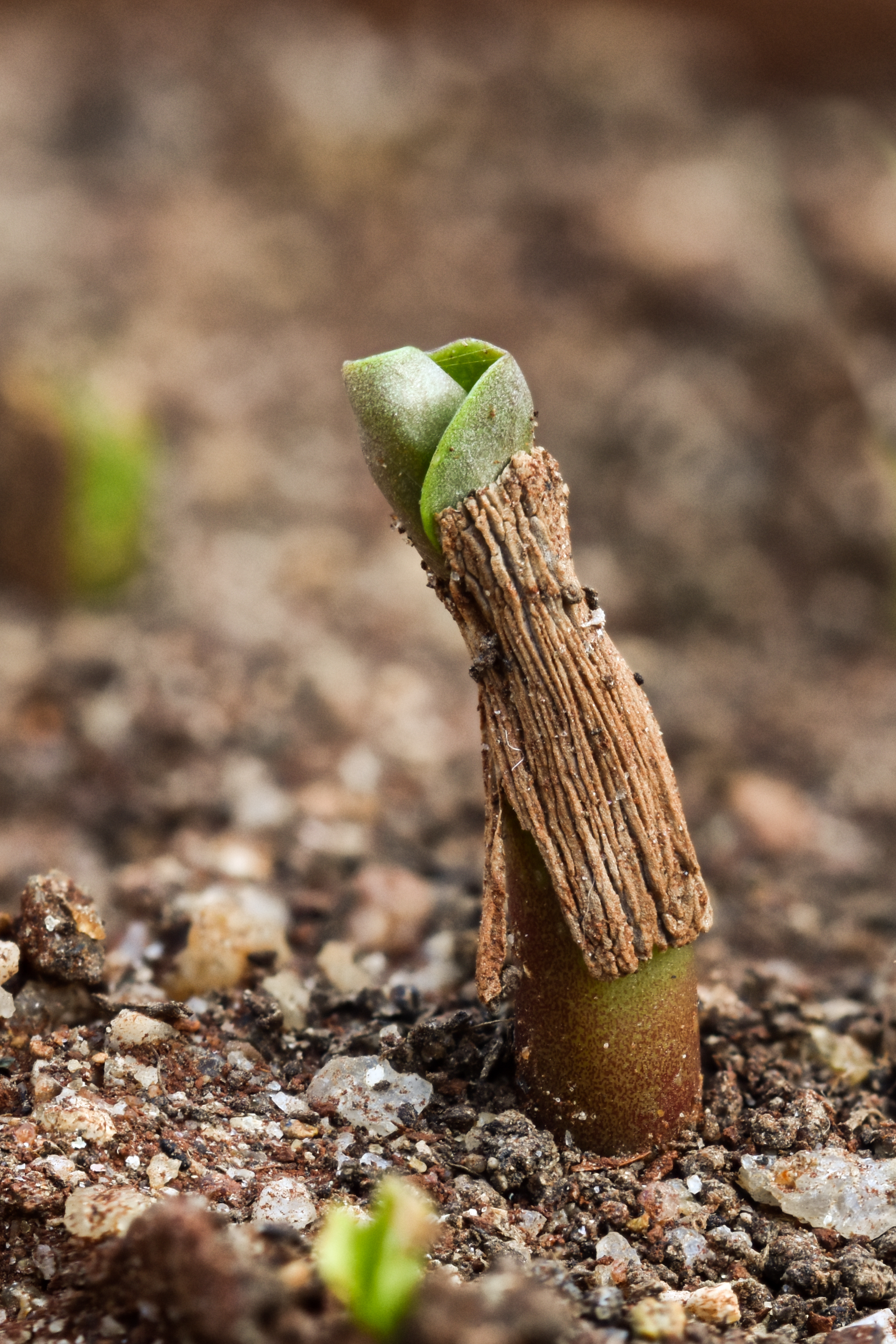
2-day seedling with seed husk 15 mm (0.59 in), Chennai.

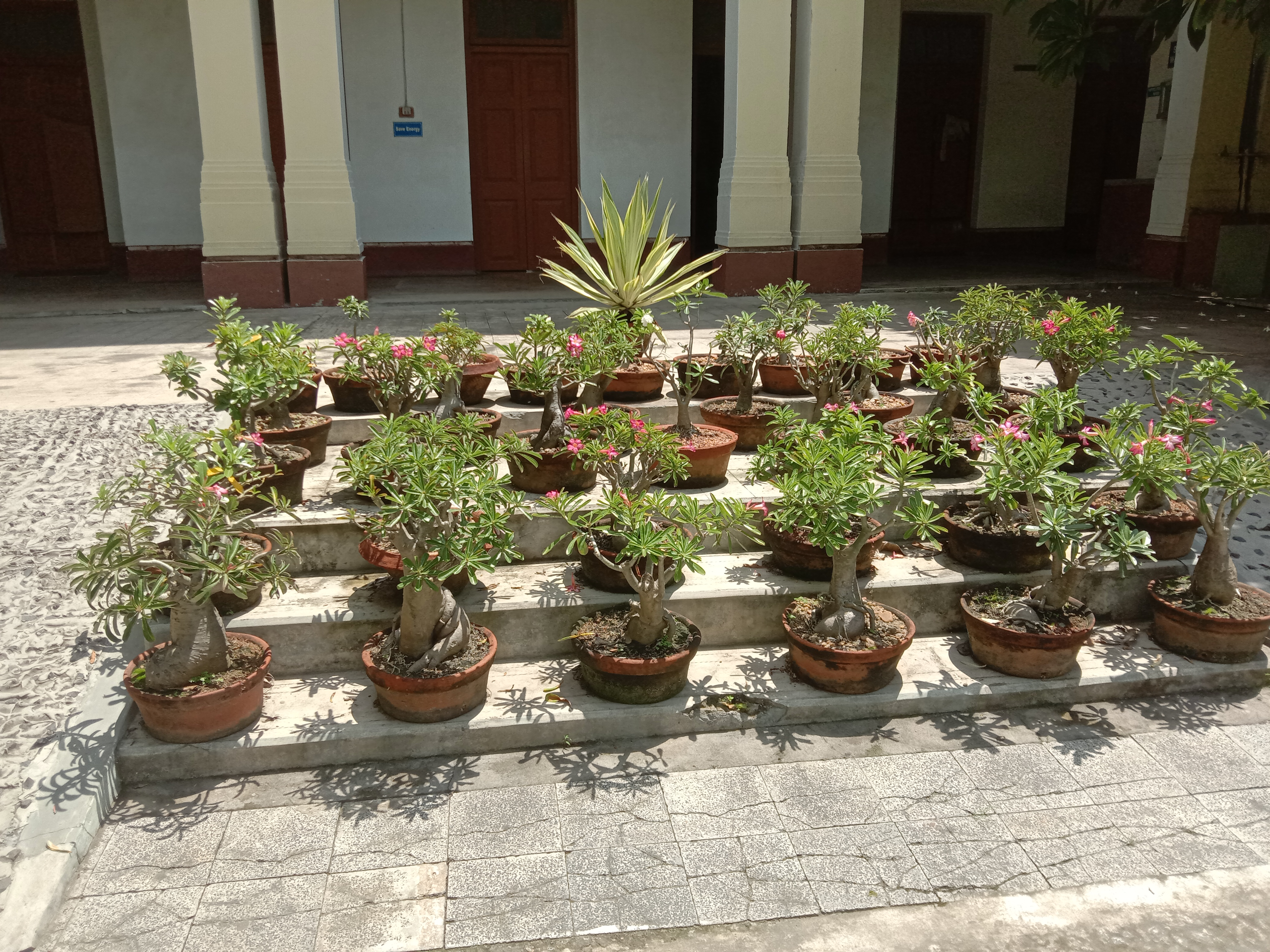
Group of plants at the campus of Ramakrishna Mission Vidyamandira in West Bengal, India.

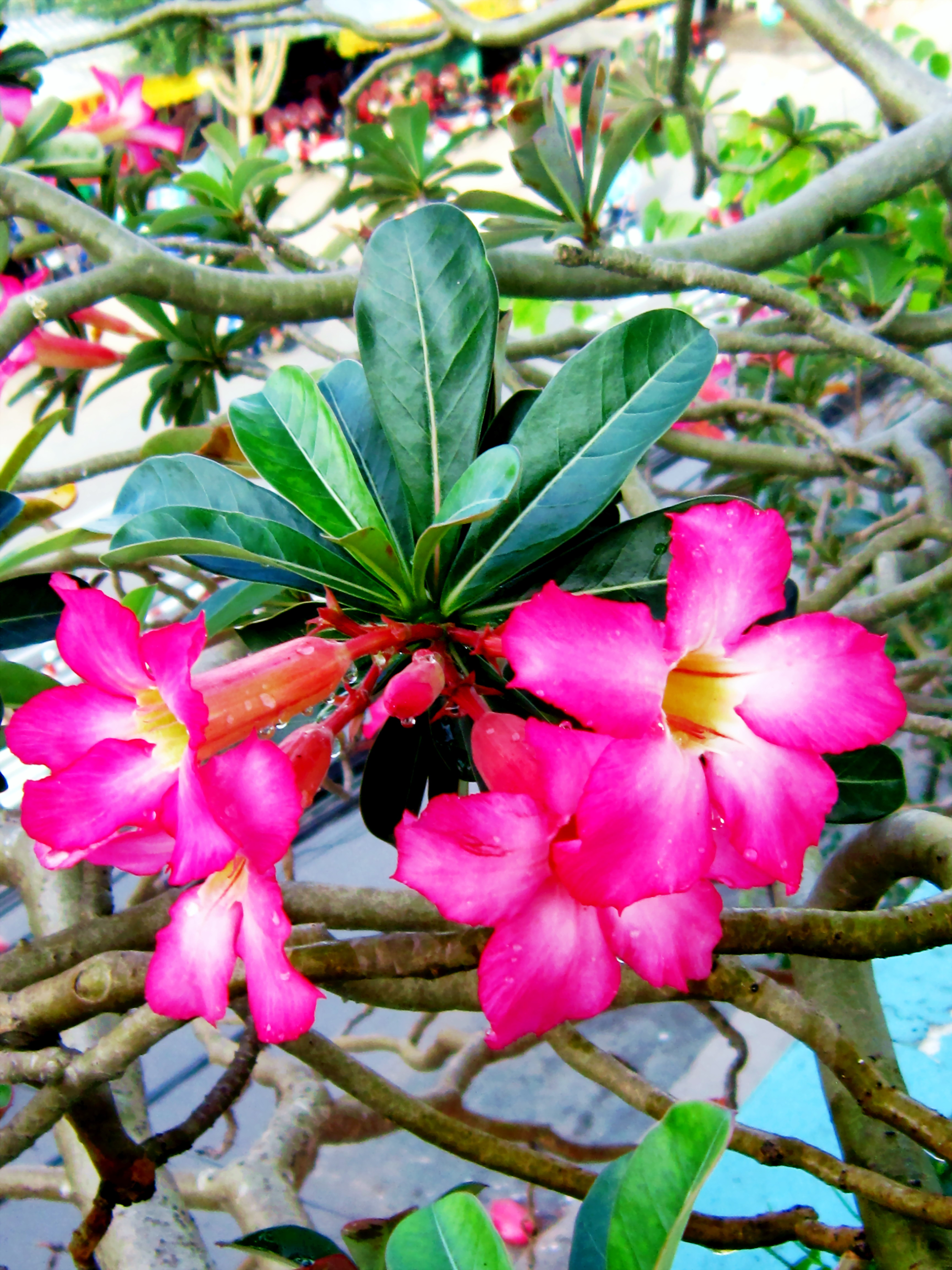
Flowers and leaves, Thailand

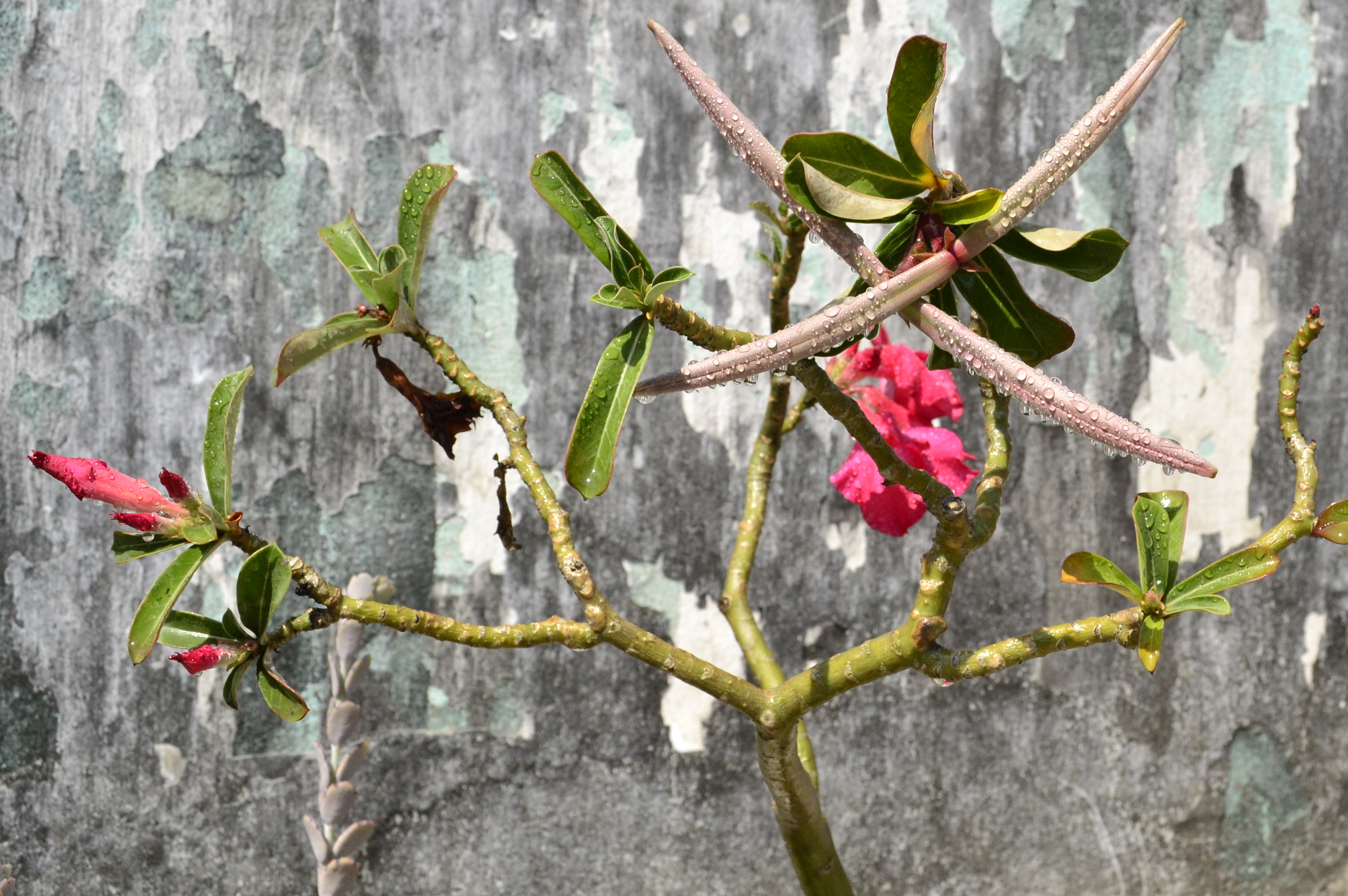
Paired, follicular fruits on cultivated specimen, Bengal

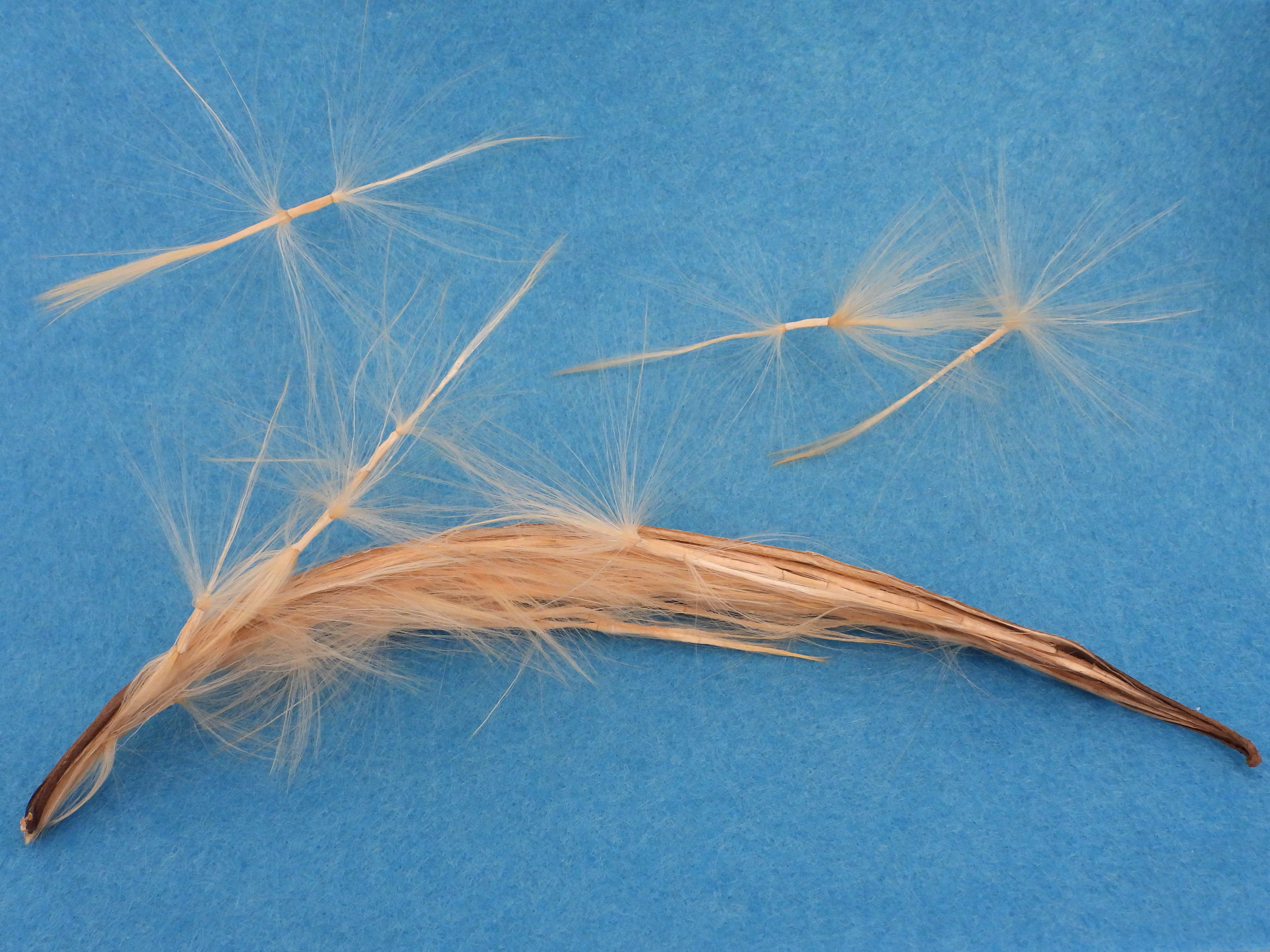
Single, dehiscent fruit showing seeds equipped with double pappus (tuft of hairs at both ends)

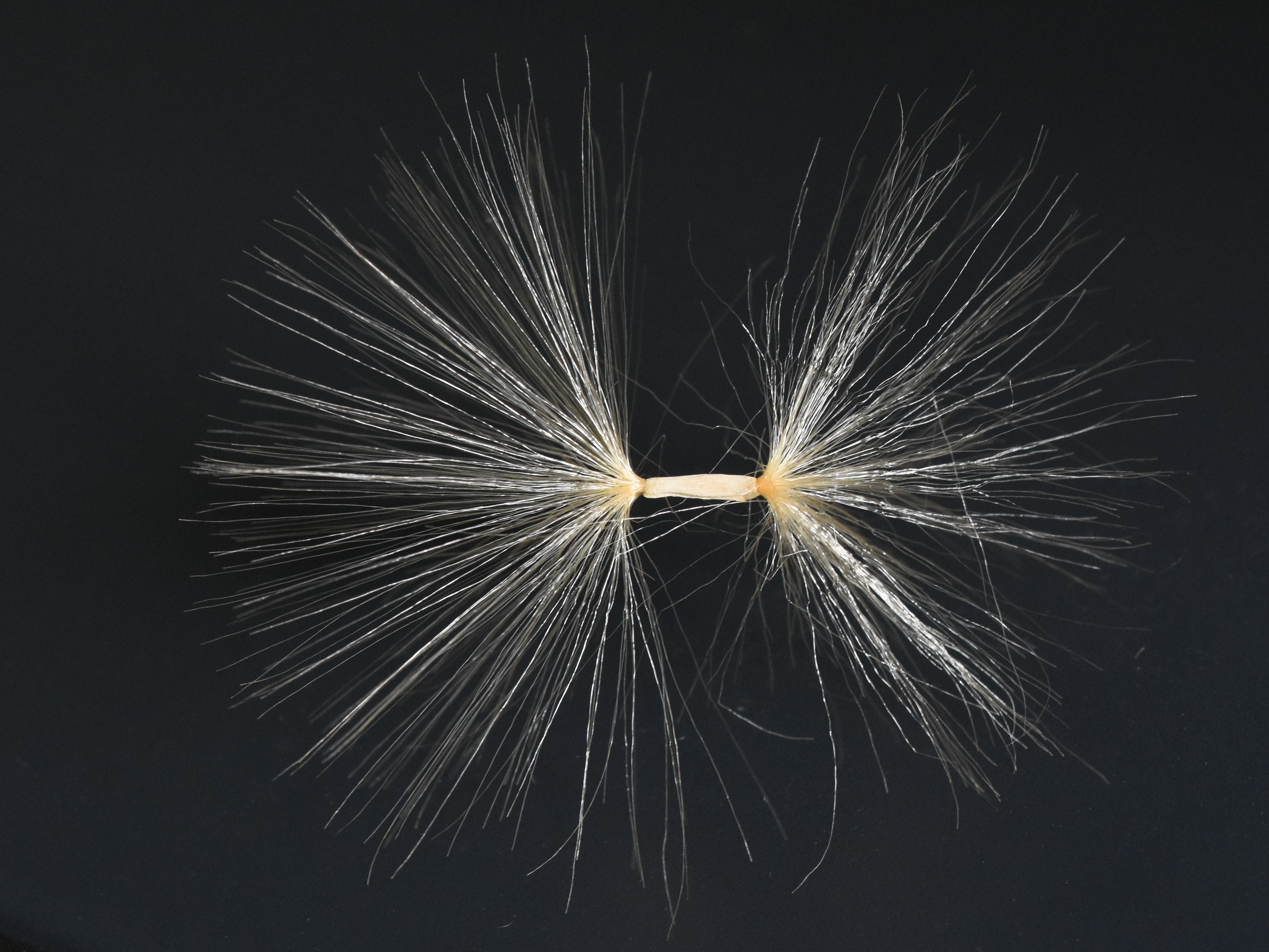
Single seed 1 cm (0.39 in) long with pappus

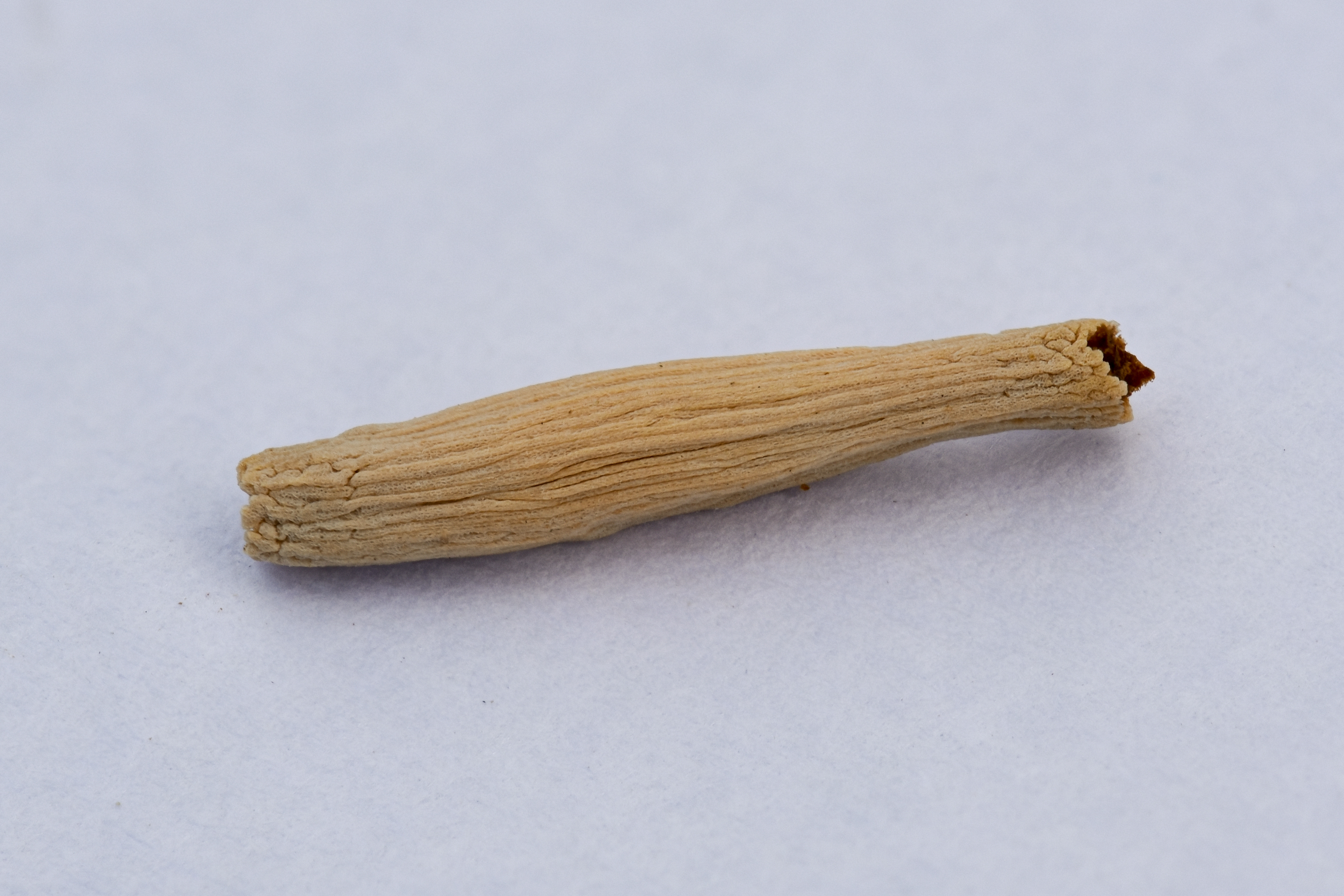
Seed 1 cm (0.39 in) long, stripped of the double pappus which allows wind-dispersal

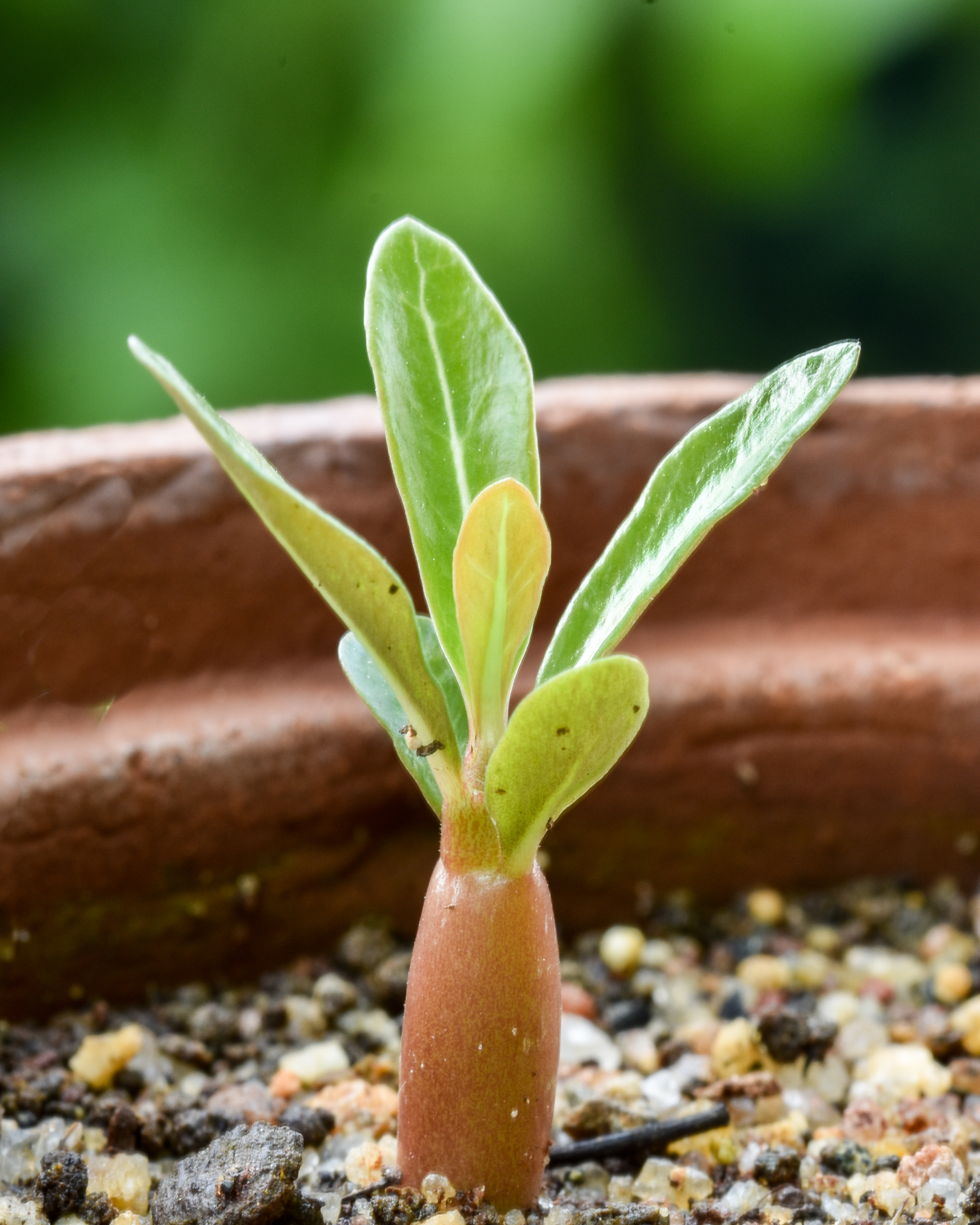
Seedling, 18 days old, 3.3 cm (1.3 in)
