= Phoenicoprocta partheni =

Scientific classification
- Domain: Eukaryota
- Kingdom: Animalia
- Phylum: Arthropoda
- Class: Insecta
- Order: Lepidoptera
- Superfamily: Noctuoidea
- Family: Erebidae
- Subfamily: Arctiinae
- Genus: Phoenicoprocta
- Species: P. partheni

Binomial name
- Phoenicoprocta partheni (Fabricius, 1793)

Synonyms
- Zygaena partheni Fabricius, 1793; Mallodeta partheni; Glaucopis multicincta Walker, 1854

Species of moth

Phoenicoprocta partheni is a moth of the subfamily Arctiinae. It was described by Johan Christian Fabricius in 1793. It is found on Haiti.
