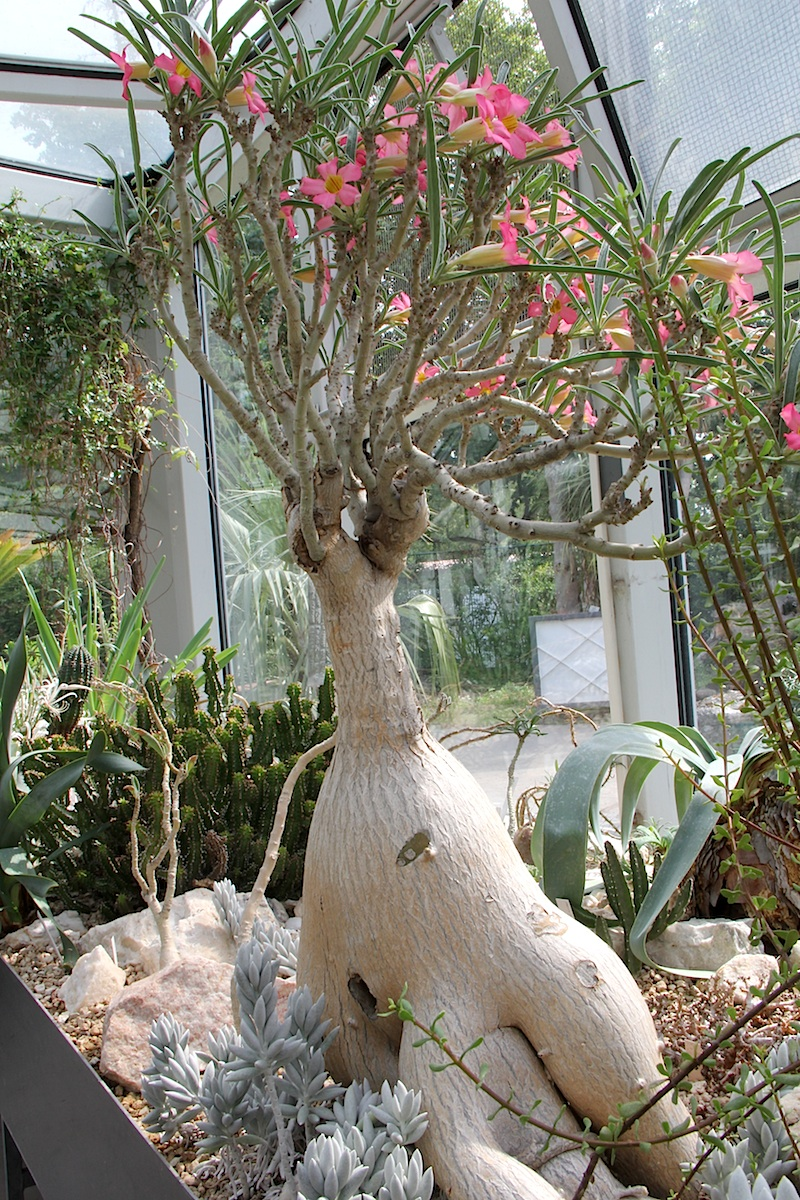

Scientific classification
- Kingdom: Plantae
- Clade: Tracheophytes
- Clade: Angiosperms
- Clade: Eudicots
- Clade: Asterids
- Order: Gentianales
- Family: Apocynaceae
- Genus: Adenium
- Species: A. oleifolium

Binomial name
- Adenium oleifolium Stapf

Synonyms
- Adenium lugardiae N.E.Br.; Adenium obesum subsp. oleifolium (Stapf) G.D.Rowley; Adenium oleifolium var. angustifolium Phil.; Adenium somalense var. angustifolium (Phil.) G.D.Rowley

= Adenium oleifolium =

Species of flowering plant

Adenium oleifolium is a species of flowering plant in the family Apocynaceae.

== Distribution ==
The native range of this species is Southern Africa, including Botswana, Cape Provinces, Namibia and Northern Provinces.

It's a semisucculent subshrub and grows primarily in the desert or dry shrubland biome.
