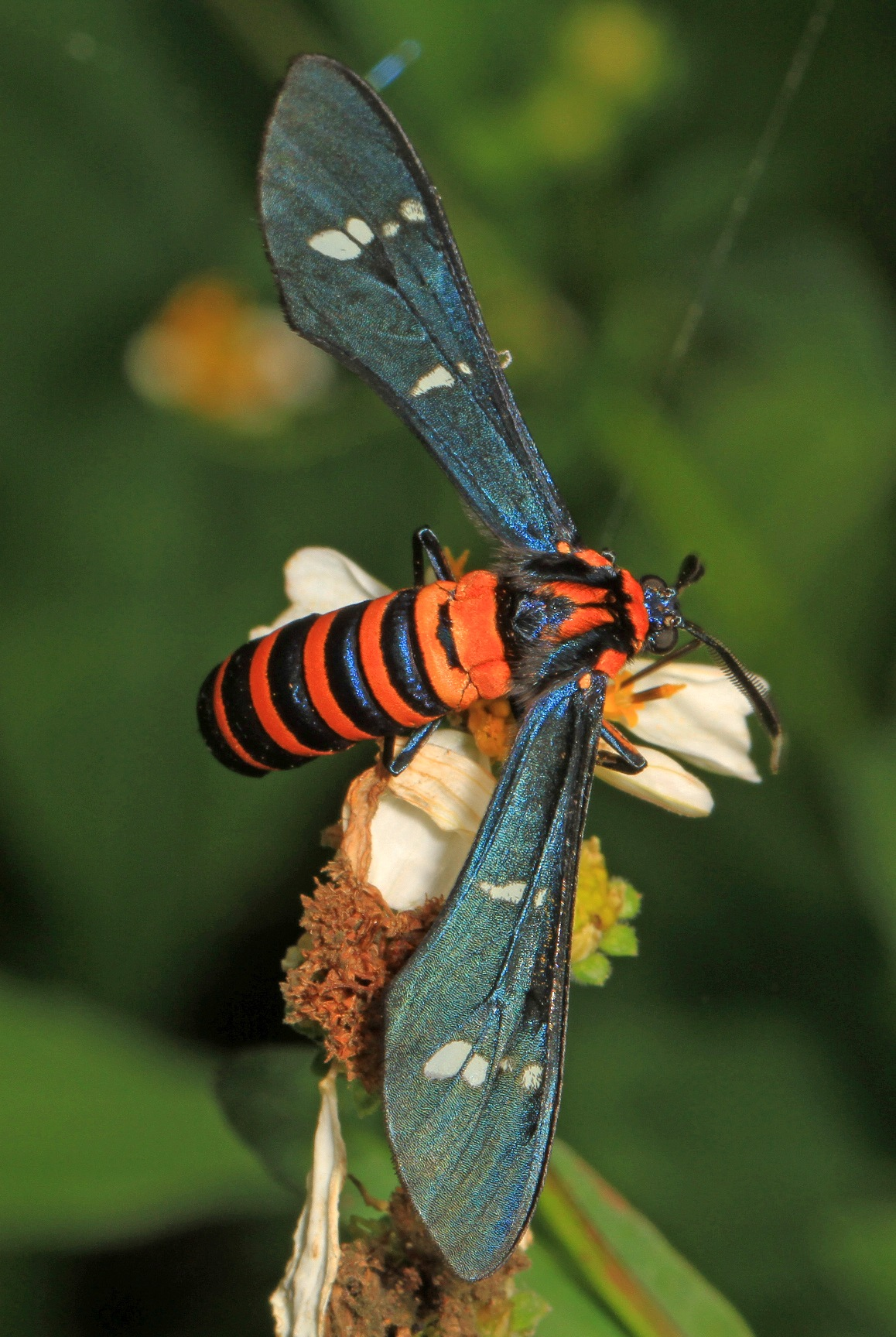
- Syntomeida ipomoeae

Scientific classification
- Domain: Eukaryota
- Kingdom: Animalia
- Phylum: Arthropoda
- Class: Insecta
- Order: Lepidoptera
- Superfamily: Noctuoidea
- Family: Erebidae
- Subfamily: Arctiinae
- Genus: Syntomeida
- Species: S. ipomoeae

Binomial name
- Syntomeida ipomoeae (Harris, 1839)

Synonyms
- Glaucopis ipomoeae Harris, 1839; Euchromia ferox Walker, 1854; Glaucopis euterpe Herrich-Schäffer, [1855]

= Syntomeida ipomoeae =

Species of moth

Syntomeida ipomoeae, the yellow-banded wasp moth or orange-banded wasp moth, is a moth in the subfamily Arctiinae. It was described by Thaddeus William Harris in 1839. It is found in the US states of Florida and Georgia.
