= Phoenicoprocta thera =

Scientific classification
- Domain: Eukaryota
- Kingdom: Animalia
- Phylum: Arthropoda
- Class: Insecta
- Order: Lepidoptera
- Superfamily: Noctuoidea
- Family: Erebidae
- Subfamily: Arctiinae
- Genus: Phoenicoprocta
- Species: P. thera

Binomial name
- Phoenicoprocta thera (H. Druce, 1889)

Synonyms
- Dycladia thera H. Druce, 1889

Species of moth

Phoenicoprocta thera is a moth in the subfamily Arctiinae. It was described by Herbert Druce in 1889. It is found in Mexico.
