= Phoenicoprocta capistrata =

Scientific classification
- Domain: Eukaryota
- Kingdom: Animalia
- Phylum: Arthropoda
- Class: Insecta
- Order: Lepidoptera
- Superfamily: Noctuoidea
- Family: Erebidae
- Subfamily: Arctiinae
- Genus: Phoenicoprocta
- Species: P. capistrata

Binomial name
- Phoenicoprocta capistrata (Fabricius, 1775)

Synonyms
- Zygaena capistrata Fabricius, 1775; Bombiliodes capistrata; Laemocharis selecta Herrich-Schäffer [1854]; Mallodeta cubana Gaede, 1926; Glaucopis eximia Herrich-Schäffer, 1866; Phoenicoprocta eximia

Species of moth

Phoenicoprocta capistrata is a moth in the subfamily Arctiinae. The species was first described by Johan Christian Fabricius in 1775. It is found in the Caribbean and Brazil.

The larvae feed on Serjania diversifolia.
