= Phoenicoprocta teda =

Scientific classification
- Kingdom: Animalia
- Phylum: Arthropoda
- Class: Insecta
- Order: Lepidoptera
- Superfamily: Noctuoidea
- Family: Erebidae
- Subfamily: Arctiinae
- Genus: Phoenicoprocta
- Species: P. teda

Binomial name
- Phoenicoprocta teda (Walker, 1854)

Synonyms
- Glaucopis teda Walker, 1854

Species of moth

Phoenicoprocta teda is a moth in the subfamily Arctiinae. It was described by Francis Walker in 1854. It is found in Santa Catarina, Brazil.
