= Phoenicoprocta jamaicensis =

Scientific classification
- Domain: Eukaryota
- Kingdom: Animalia
- Phylum: Arthropoda
- Class: Insecta
- Order: Lepidoptera
- Superfamily: Noctuoidea
- Family: Erebidae
- Subfamily: Arctiinae
- Genus: Phoenicoprocta
- Species: P. jamaicensis

Binomial name
- Phoenicoprocta jamaicensis (Schaus, 1901)

Synonyms
- Bombiliodes jamaicensis Schaus, 1901

Species of moth

Phoenicoprocta jamaicensis is a moth in the subfamily Arctiinae. It was described by Schaus in 1901. It is found on Jamaica.
