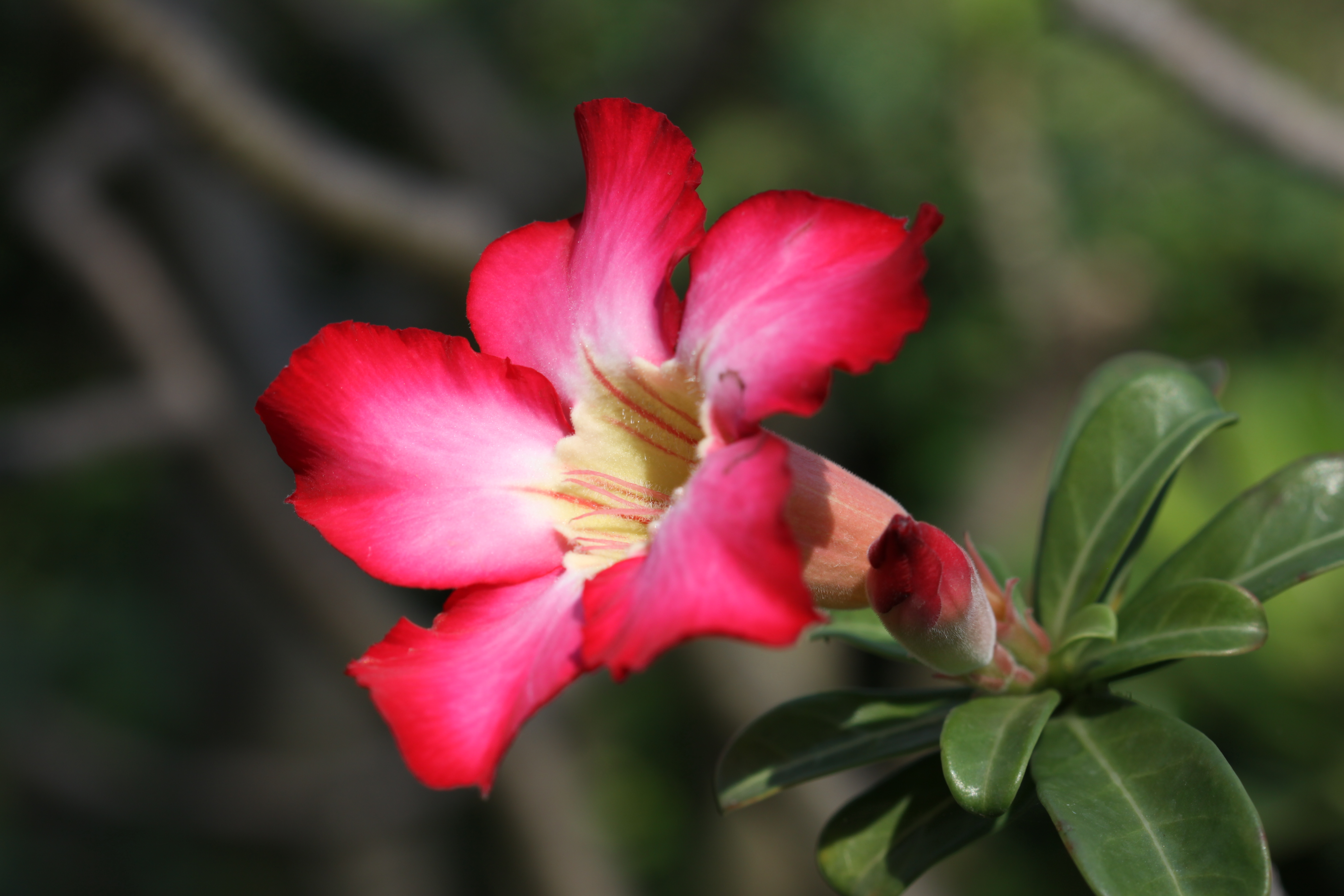
- Adenium obesum

Scientific classification
- Kingdom: Plantae
- Clade: Tracheophytes
- Clade: Angiosperms
- Clade: Eudicots
- Clade: Asterids
- Order: Gentianales
- Family: Apocynaceae
- Subfamily: Apocynoideae
- Tribe: Nerieae
- Genus: Adenium; Roem. & Schult.

Synonyms
- Adenum G.Don; Idaneum Kuntze & Post

= Adenium =

Genus of flowering plants

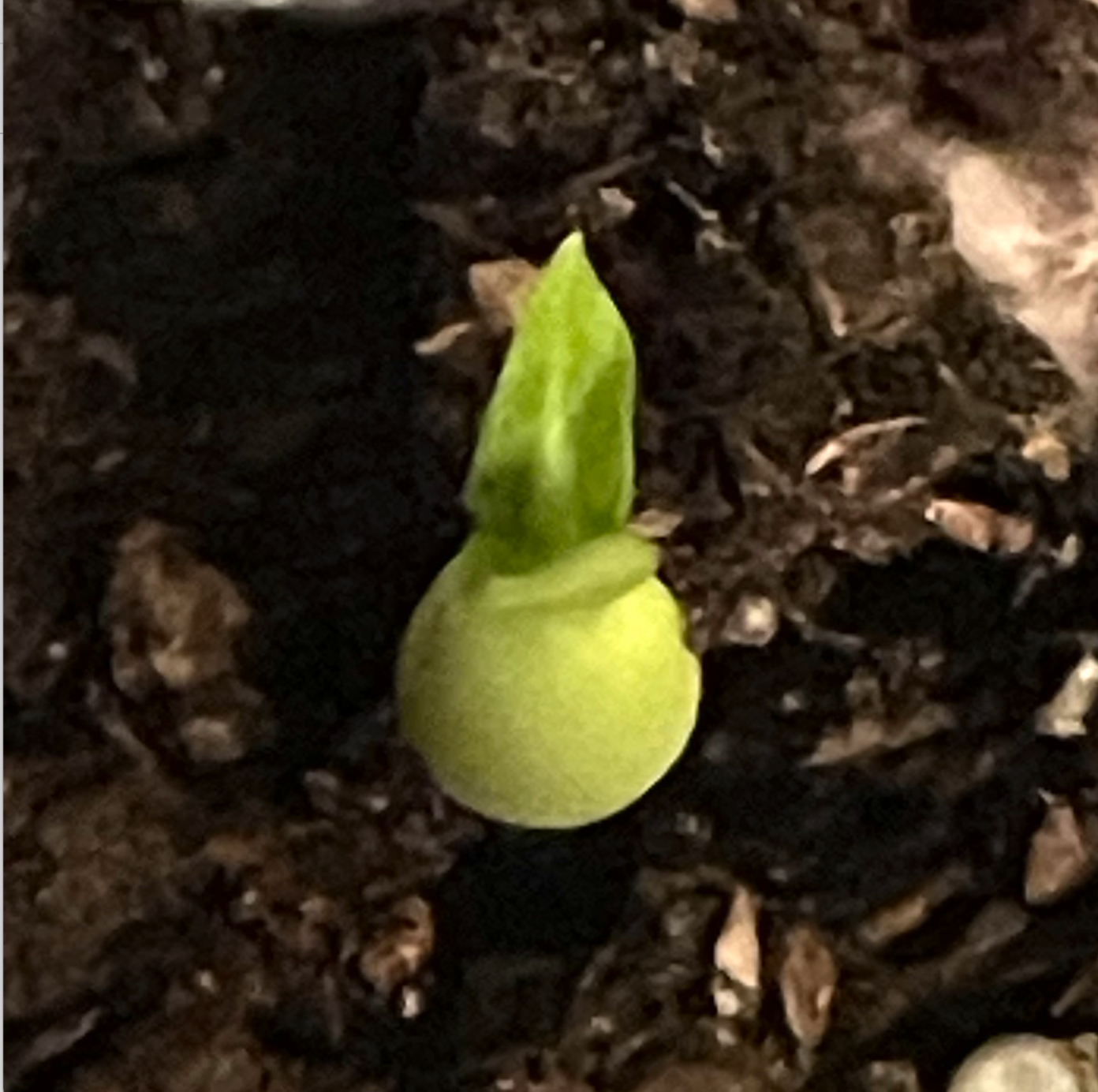
Seedlings

Adenium is a genus of flowering plants in the family Apocynaceae first described as a genus in 1819. It is native to Africa and the Arabian Peninsula.

== Cultivation and uses ==
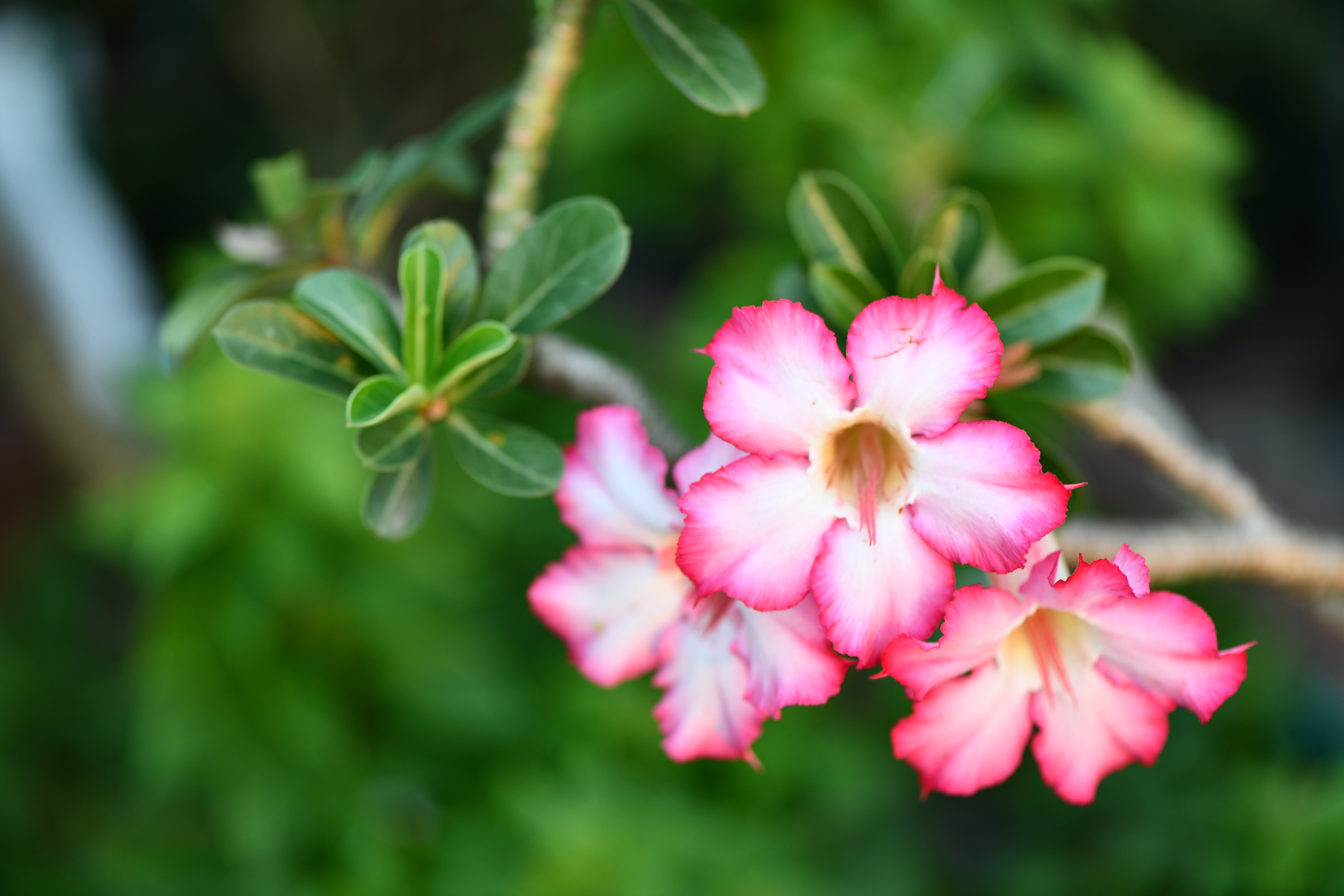
Adenium in Thailand

Adenium obesum is grown as a houseplant in temperate and tropical regions. Numerous hybrids have been developed. Adeniums are appreciated for their colorful flowers and unusual thick caudices. They can be grown for many years in a pot and are commonly used for bonsai.

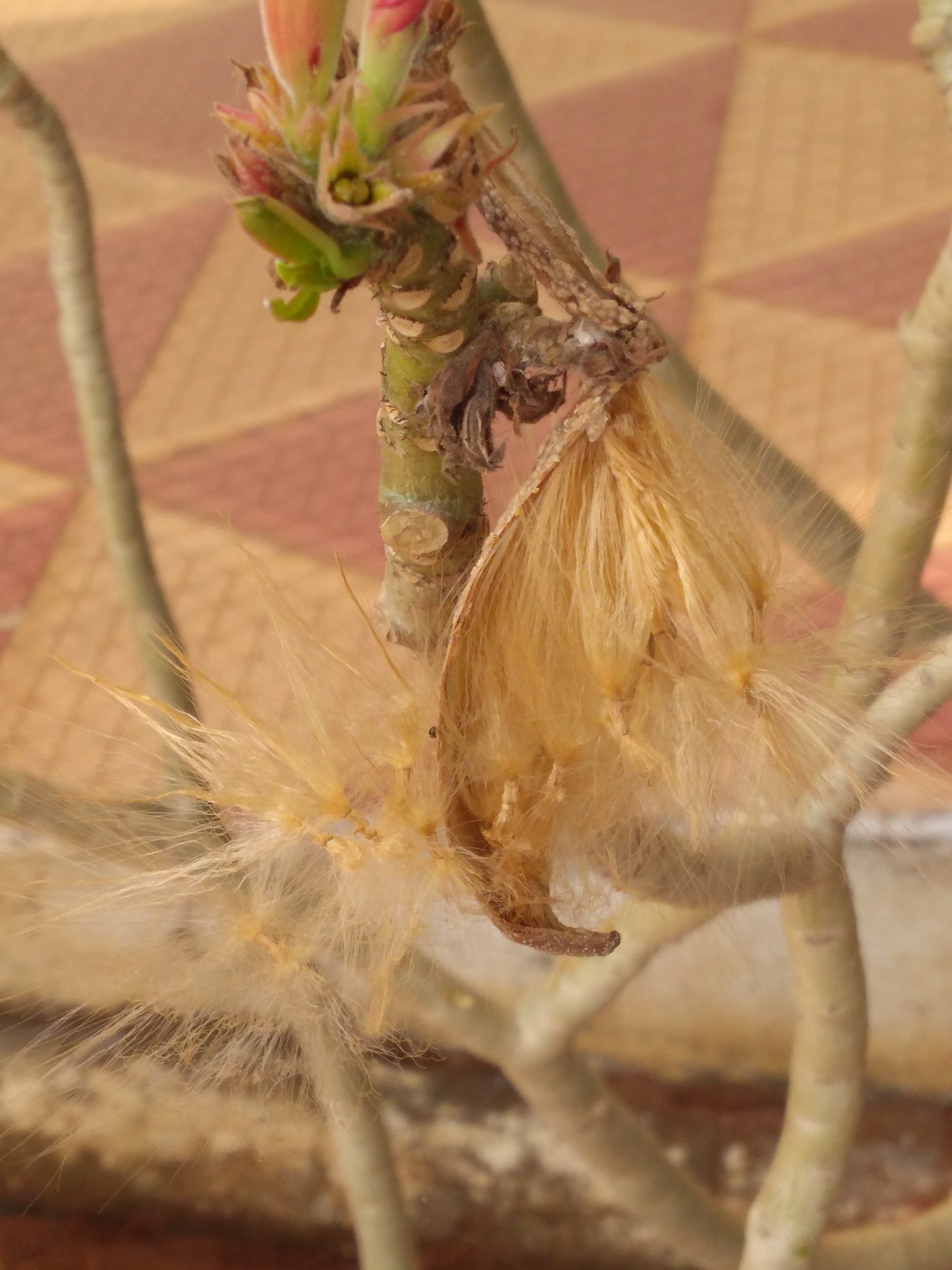
One of the paired, follicular fruit of an Adenium species, dehiscing to release seeds equipped with a double pappus (i.e. tuft of hairs at each end) for wind-dispersal

Because seed-grown plants are not genetically identical to the mother plant, desirable varieties are commonly propagated by grafting. Genetically identical plants can also be propagated by cutting. Cutting-grown plants do not tend to develop a desirable thick caudex as quickly as seed-grown plants.

The sap of Adenium boehmianum, A. multiflorum, and A. obesum contains toxic cardiac glycosides and is used as arrow poison throughout Africa for hunting large game.

== Classification ==
The genus Adenium has been held to contain as many as twelve species. These are considered by other authors to be subspecies or varieties. A late-20th-century classification by Plazier recognizes five species.

Species

1. Adenium arabicum Balf.f. = Adenium obesum
2. Adenium boehmianum Schinz - (Namibia, Angola)
3. Adenium multiflorum Klotzsch. (Southern Africa, from Zambia south)
4. Adenium obesum (Forssk.) Roem. & Schult. - widespread from Senegal to Somalia, and also Arabian Peninsula
5. Adenium oleifolium Stapf - South Africa, Botswana, Namibia
6. Adenium swazicum Stapf (Eastern South Africa)

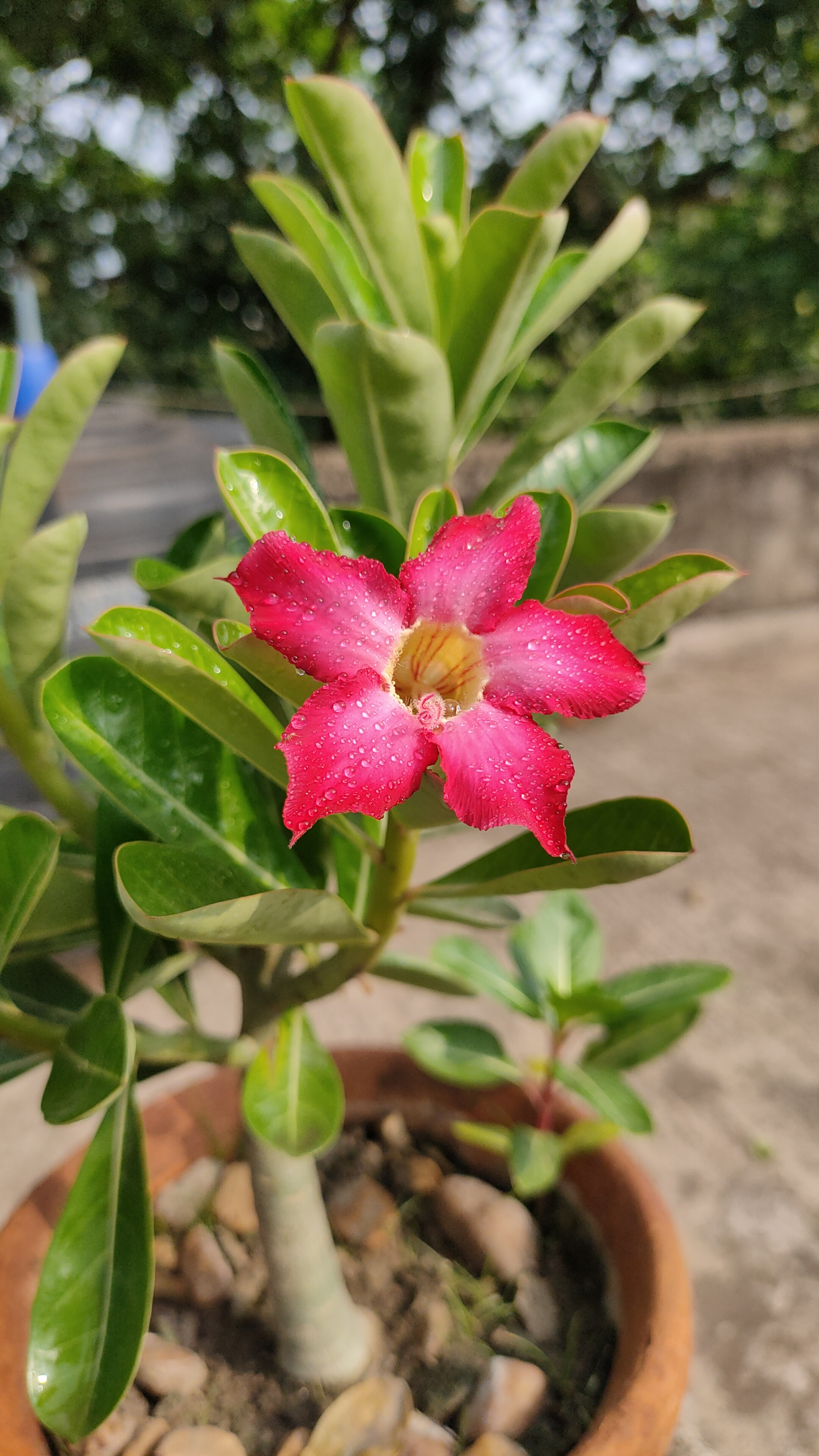
Desert rose

Formerly placed here

- Pachypodium namaquanum (Wyley ex Harv.) Welw. (as A. namaquanum Wyley ex Harv.)

== Common names ==
Adenium obesum is also known as the desert rose. In the Philippines, due to its resemblance to the related genus Plumeria, and the fact that it was introduced to the Philippines from Bangkok, Thailand, the plant is also called as Bangkok kalachuchi.

Due to its resemblance to a miniature frangipani tree and its popularity in bonsai, it is also sometimes known as Japanese frangipani.
