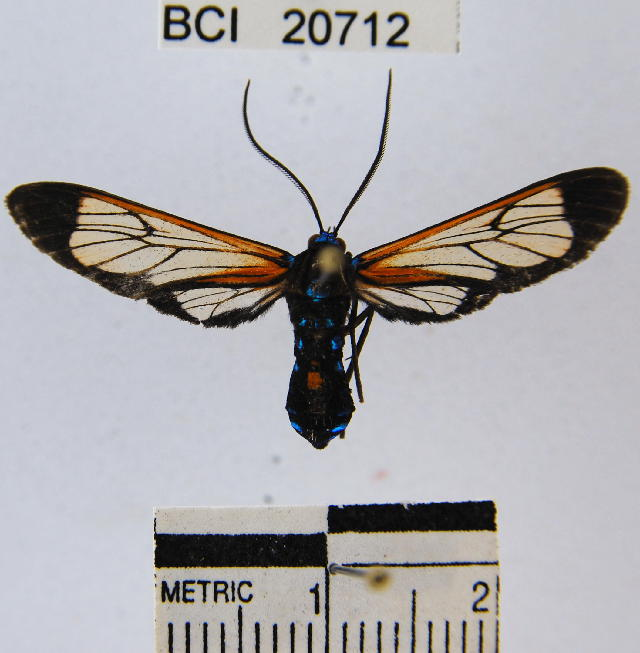

Scientific classification
- Kingdom: Animalia
- Phylum: Arthropoda
- Class: Insecta
- Order: Lepidoptera
- Superfamily: Noctuoidea
- Family: Erebidae
- Subfamily: Arctiinae
- Genus: Phoenicoprocta
- Species: P. paucipuncta

Binomial name
- Phoenicoprocta paucipuncta Dyar, 1914

= Phoenicoprocta paucipuncta =

Species of moth

Phoenicoprocta paucipuncta is a moth in the subfamily Arctiinae. It was described by Harrison Gray Dyar Jr. in 1914. It is found in Panama.
