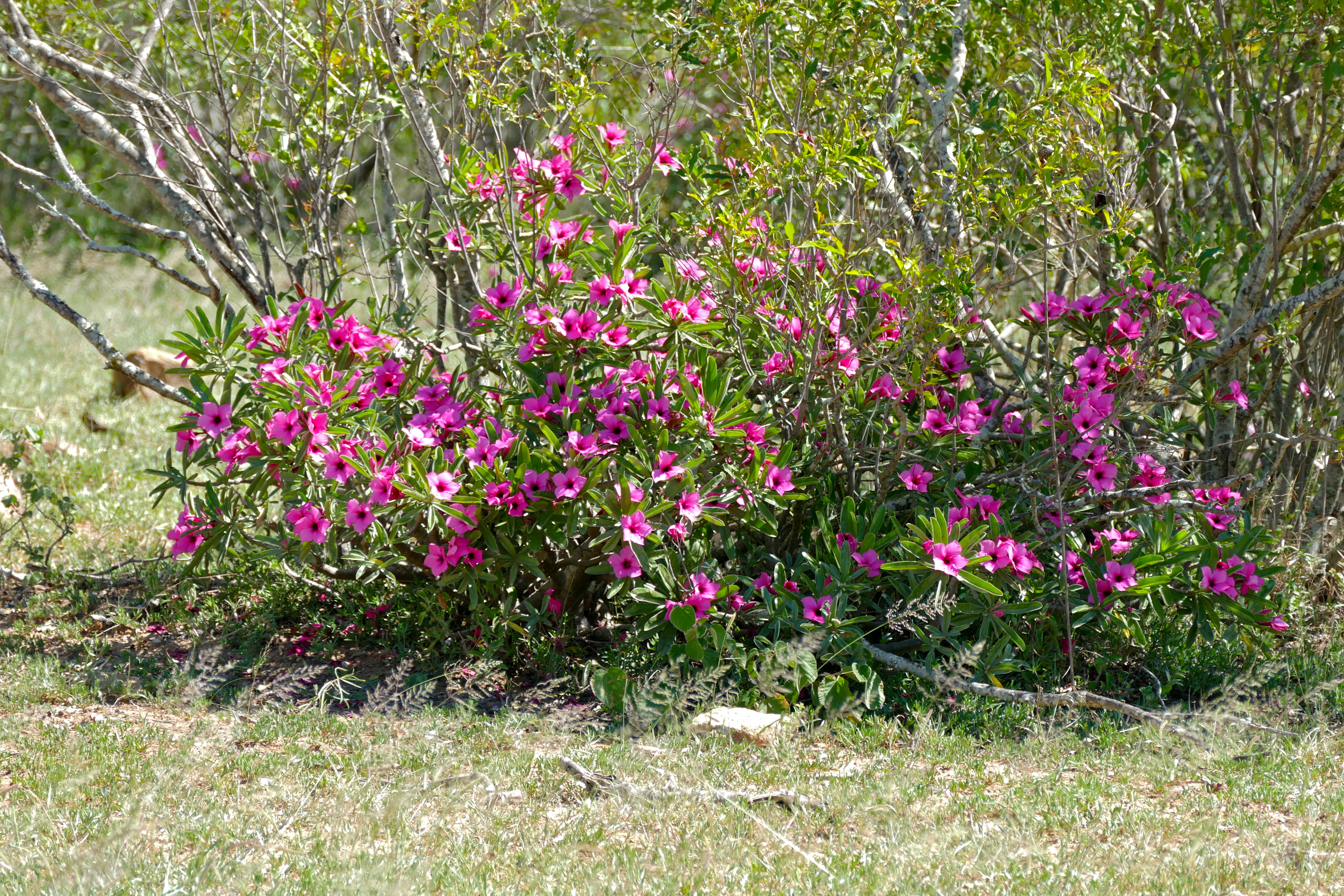

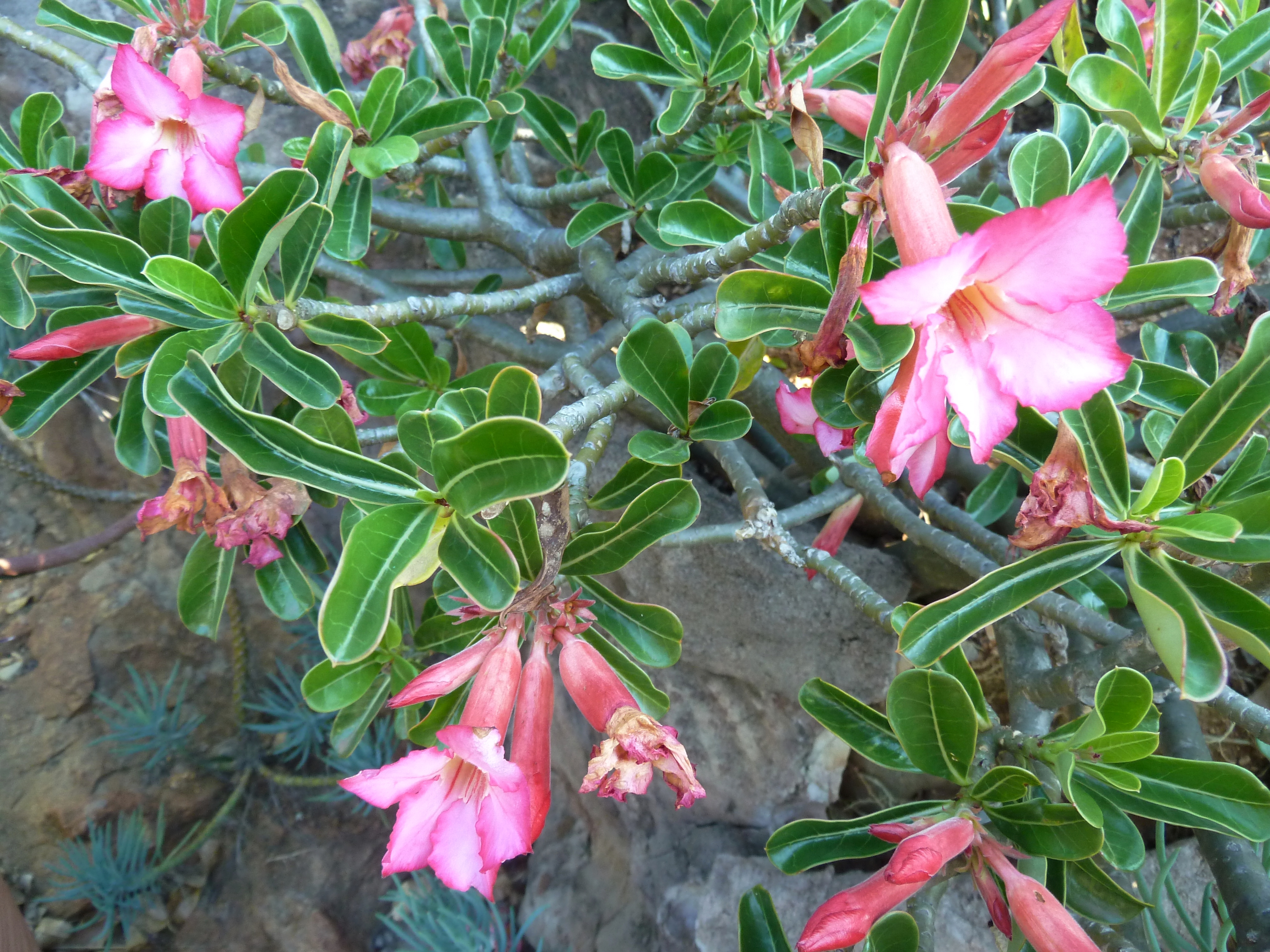

Scientific classification
- Kingdom: Plantae
- Clade: Tracheophytes
- Clade: Angiosperms
- Clade: Eudicots
- Clade: Asterids
- Order: Gentianales
- Family: Apocynaceae
- Genus: Adenium
- Species: A. swazicum

Binomial name
- Adenium swazicum Stapf

Synonyms
- A. boehmianum var. swazicum (Stapf) G.D.Rowley; A. obesum subsp. swazicum (Stapf) G.D.Rowley

= Adenium swazicum =

Summer-flowering impala lily

Species of flowering plant

Adenium swazicum is a species of flowering plant in the family Apocynaceae. It is a semisucculent shrub native to the lowveld of Eswatini, Mpumalanga province of South Africa, and southern Mozambique.
