= Syntomeida vulcana =

Scientific classification
- Domain: Eukaryota
- Kingdom: Animalia
- Phylum: Arthropoda
- Class: Insecta
- Order: Lepidoptera
- Superfamily: Noctuoidea
- Family: Erebidae
- Subfamily: Arctiinae
- Genus: Syntomeida
- Species: S. vulcana

Binomial name
- Syntomeida vulcana H. Druce, 1889

Species of moth

Syntomeida vulcana is a moth in the subfamily Arctiinae. It was described by Herbert Druce in 1889. It is found in Mexico.
