= Phoenicoprocta sanguinea =

Scientific classification
- Kingdom: Animalia
- Phylum: Arthropoda
- Class: Insecta
- Order: Lepidoptera
- Superfamily: Noctuoidea
- Family: Erebidae
- Subfamily: Arctiinae
- Genus: Phoenicoprocta
- Species: P. sanguinea

Binomial name
- Phoenicoprocta sanguinea (Walker, 1854)

Synonyms
- Glaucopis sanguinea Walker, 1854; Hyela sanguinea

Species of moth

Phoenicoprocta sanguinea is a moth in the subfamily Arctiinae. It was described by Francis Walker in 1854. It is found in Honduras.
