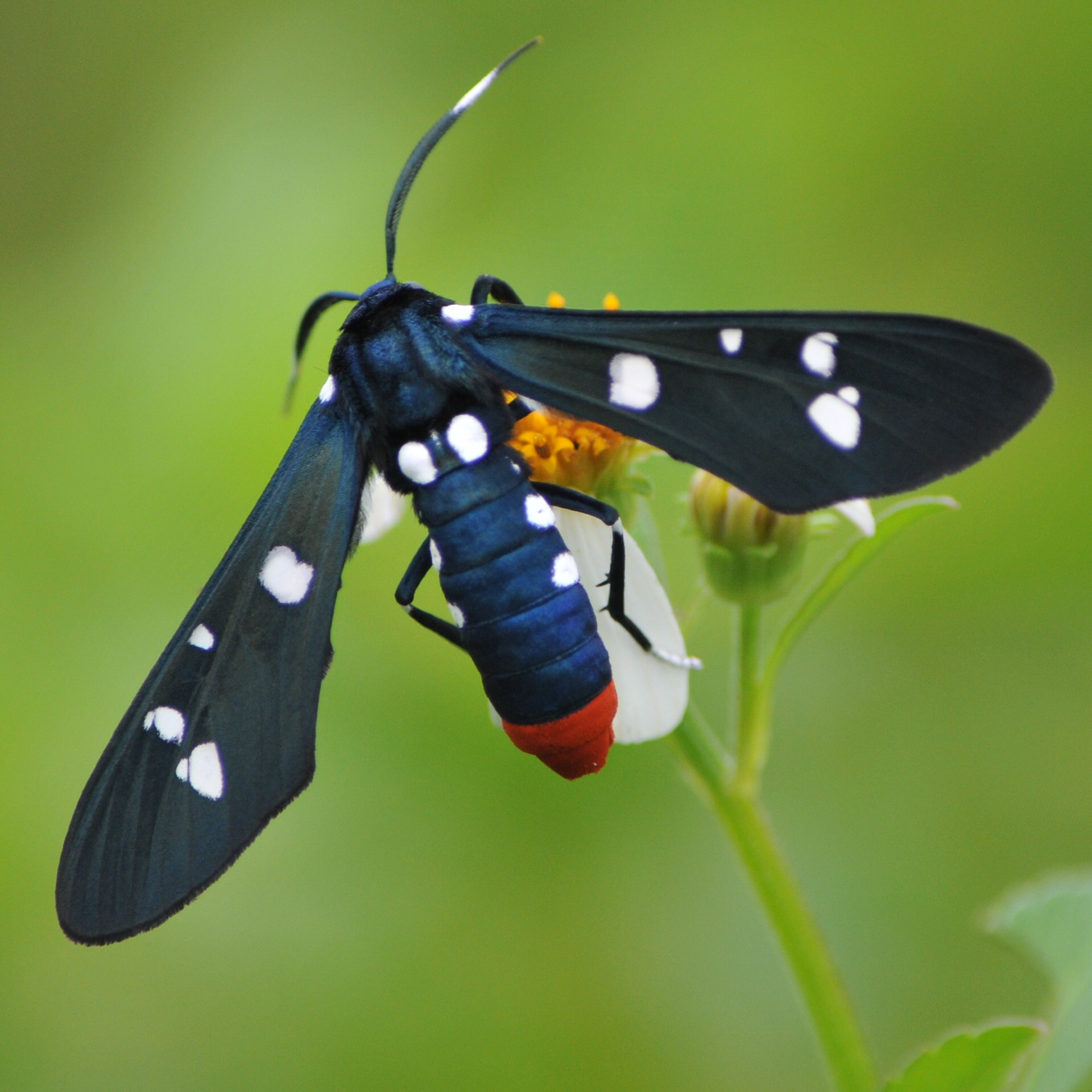

Scientific classification
- Kingdom: Animalia
- Phylum: Arthropoda
- Class: Insecta
- Order: Lepidoptera
- Superfamily: Noctuoidea
- Family: Erebidae
- Subfamily: Arctiinae
- Genus: Syntomeida
- Species: S. epilais

Binomial name
- Syntomeida epilais (Walker, 1854)

Synonyms
- Euchromia epilais Walker, 1854

= Syntomeida epilais =

Polka-dot wasp moth

Species of moth

Syntomeida epilais, the polka-dot wasp moth or oleander moth, is a species of moth thought to be native to the Caribbean. Its larvae feed on the oleander plant. Like most wasp moths, these are day fliers.

They prefer Neotropic areas, to which they are native. The North American subspecies is S. epilais jucundissima, which is locally common in all areas of Florida, and has been seen as far north as South Carolina, and west to Mississippi and Texas.

== Description ==
They are dark metallic blue with white polka-dots on the wings and upper abdomen, and the tip of the abdomen is bright red. This mimicry makes it look like a dangerous wasp, while in fact being a harmless moth. The caterpillars are orange or dark orange with long black hairs making the caterpillars look dangerous, but the setae do not inflict any harm.

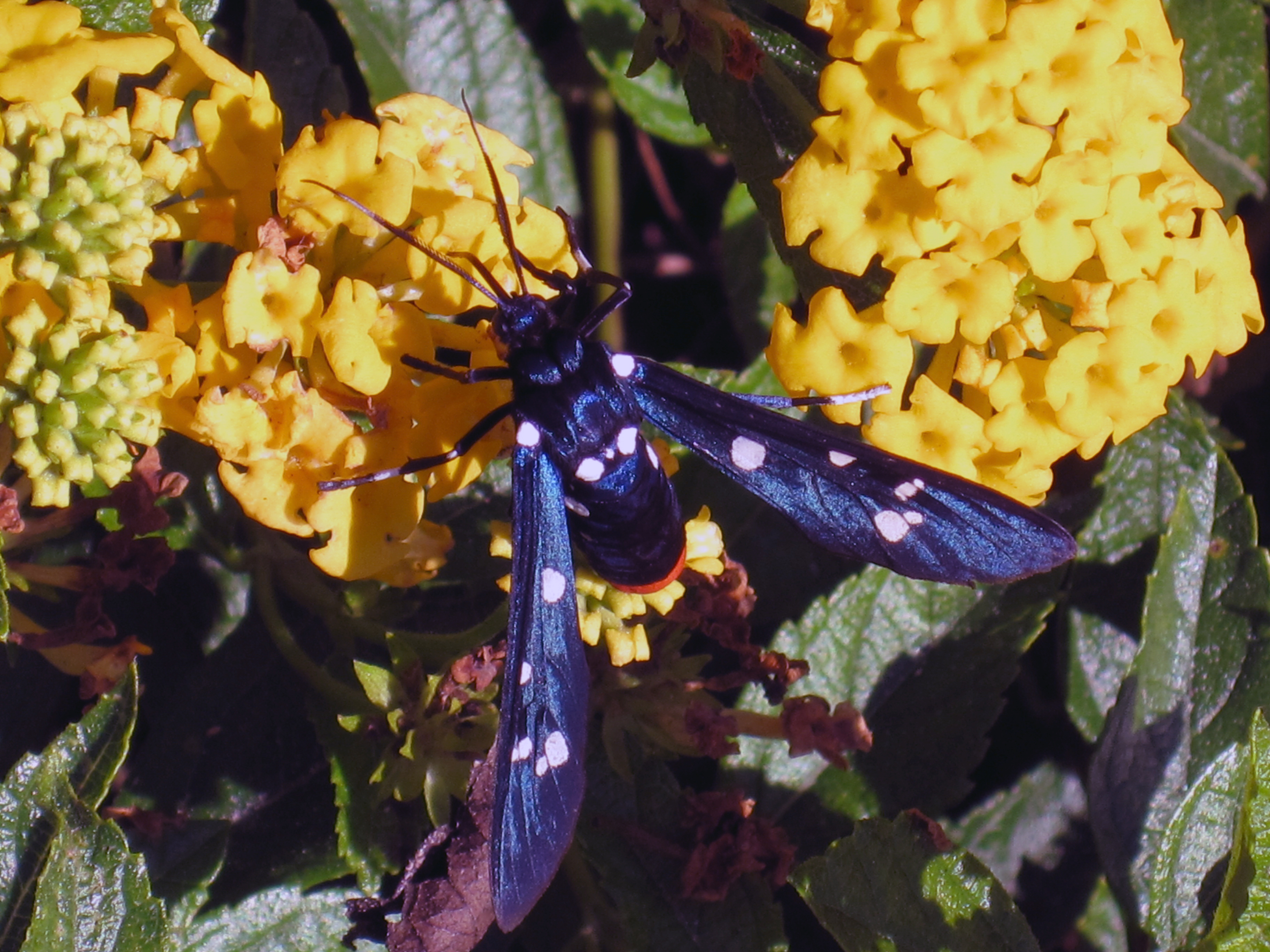
S. epilais jucundissima in Savannah, Georgia

== Reproduction and breeding ==
Females contact male polka-dot wasp moths by means of ultrasonic signals. On the branch, the sound travels, and then the male follows the sound to his new mate. When he reaches her, he emits an answering signal. After mating, the females find a plant on which to lay their eggs. Groups of from 12 to 75 eggs are laid on the undersides of the oleander leaves. The spherical eggs are pale cream to light yellow in color; each is less than 1 mm in diameter.

== As a pest ==
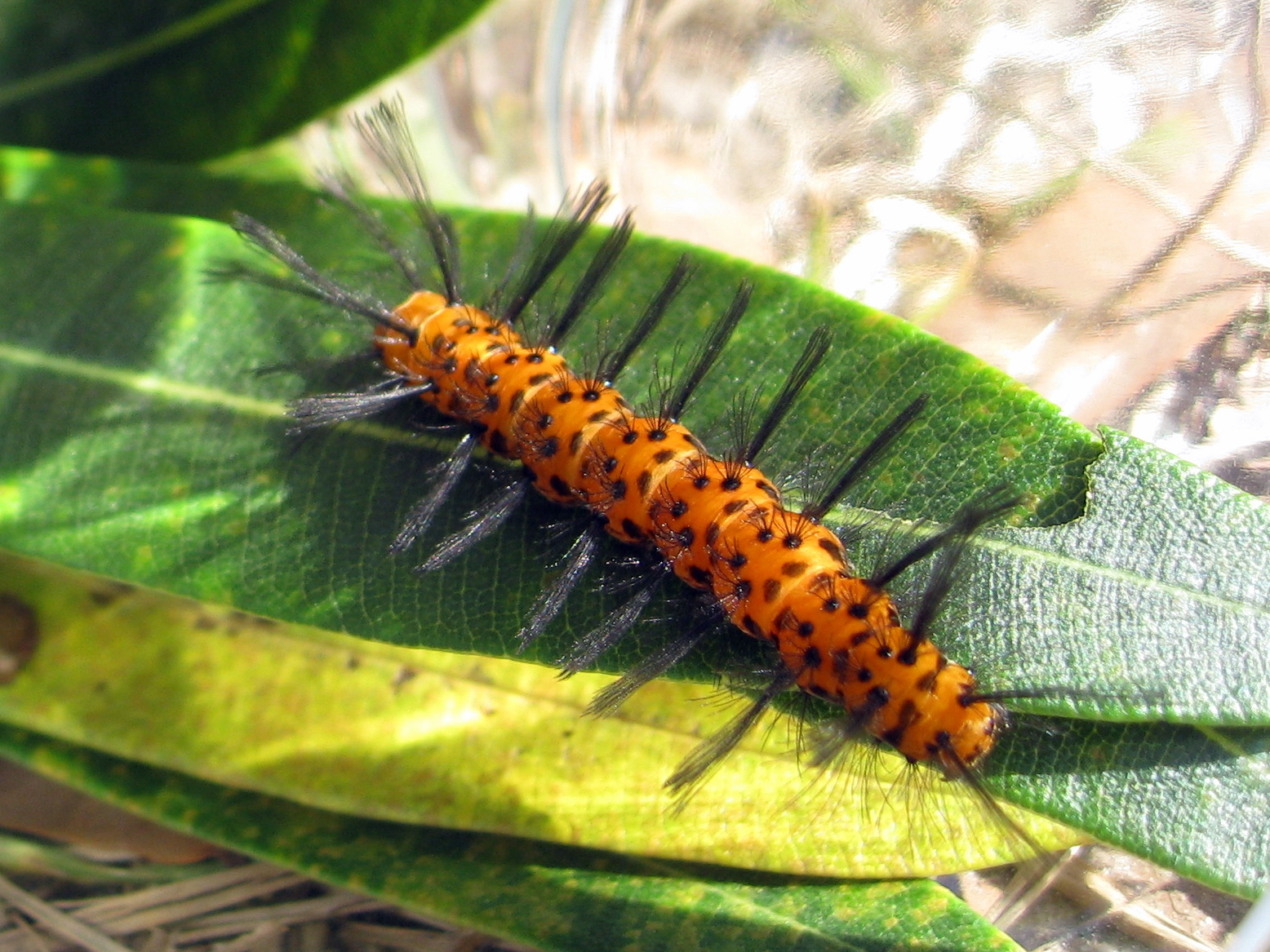
Larva

The larval stage of the polka-dot wasp moth, commonly called the oleander caterpillar, is widely known for its gluttonous appetite. The caterpillar feeds in almost any location (excepting California) where its food, the oleander plant, can be found. They are gregarious and can cause damage from minor to severe. It may also feed on devil's potato plants, which are believed to be its native food before the oleander plant was introduced to the Americas by Spanish settlers in the seventeenth century. They also feed on desert rose plants.

== Subspecies ==
- Syntomeida epilais epilais
- Syntomeida epilais jucundissima Dyar, 1907 (Florida, Georgia)

== See also ==
- Oleander
- Euchromiini
- Empyreuma pugione, spotted oleander caterpillar moth
