= Phoenicoprocta lydia =

Scientific classification
- Domain: Eukaryota
- Kingdom: Animalia
- Phylum: Arthropoda
- Class: Insecta
- Order: Lepidoptera
- Superfamily: Noctuoidea
- Family: Erebidae
- Subfamily: Arctiinae
- Genus: Phoenicoprocta
- Species: P. lydia

Binomial name
- Phoenicoprocta lydia (H. Druce, 1889)

Synonyms
- Dycladia lydia H. Druce, 1889

Species of moth

Phoenicoprocta lydia, the Lydia tiger moth, is a moth in the subfamily Arctiinae. It was described by Herbert Druce in 1889. It is found in Mexico and southern Texas.

Adults have been recorded on wing in October.
