= Phoenicoprocta haemorrhoidalis =

Scientific classification
- Domain: Eukaryota
- Kingdom: Animalia
- Phylum: Arthropoda
- Class: Insecta
- Order: Lepidoptera
- Superfamily: Noctuoidea
- Family: Erebidae
- Subfamily: Arctiinae
- Genus: Phoenicoprocta
- Species: P. haemorrhoidalis

Binomial name
- Phoenicoprocta haemorrhoidalis (Fabricius, 1775)

Synonyms
- Sesia haemorrhoidalis Fabricius, 1775; Glaucopis frontalis Walker, 1854

Species of moth

Phoenicoprocta haemorrhoidalis is a moth in the subfamily Arctiinae. It was described by Johan Christian Fabricius in 1775. It is found in Brazil.
