= Phoenicoprocta analis =

Scientific classification
- Domain: Eukaryota
- Kingdom: Animalia
- Phylum: Arthropoda
- Class: Insecta
- Order: Lepidoptera
- Superfamily: Noctuoidea
- Family: Erebidae
- Subfamily: Arctiinae
- Genus: Phoenicoprocta
- Species: P. analis

Binomial name
- Phoenicoprocta analis Schrottky, 1909

Species of moth

Phoenicoprocta analis is a moth in the subfamily Arctiinae. It was described by Curt Schrottky in 1909. It is found in Paraguay.
