= Phoenicoprocta mexicana =

Scientific classification
- Kingdom: Animalia
- Phylum: Arthropoda
- Class: Insecta
- Order: Lepidoptera
- Superfamily: Noctuoidea
- Family: Erebidae
- Subfamily: Arctiinae
- Genus: Phoenicoprocta
- Species: P. mexicana

Binomial name
- Phoenicoprocta mexicana (Walker, [1865])

Synonyms
- Gymnelia mexicana Walker, [1865]

Species of moth

Phoenicoprocta mexicana is a moth in the subfamily Arctiinae. It was described by Francis Walker in 1865. It is found in Mexico.
