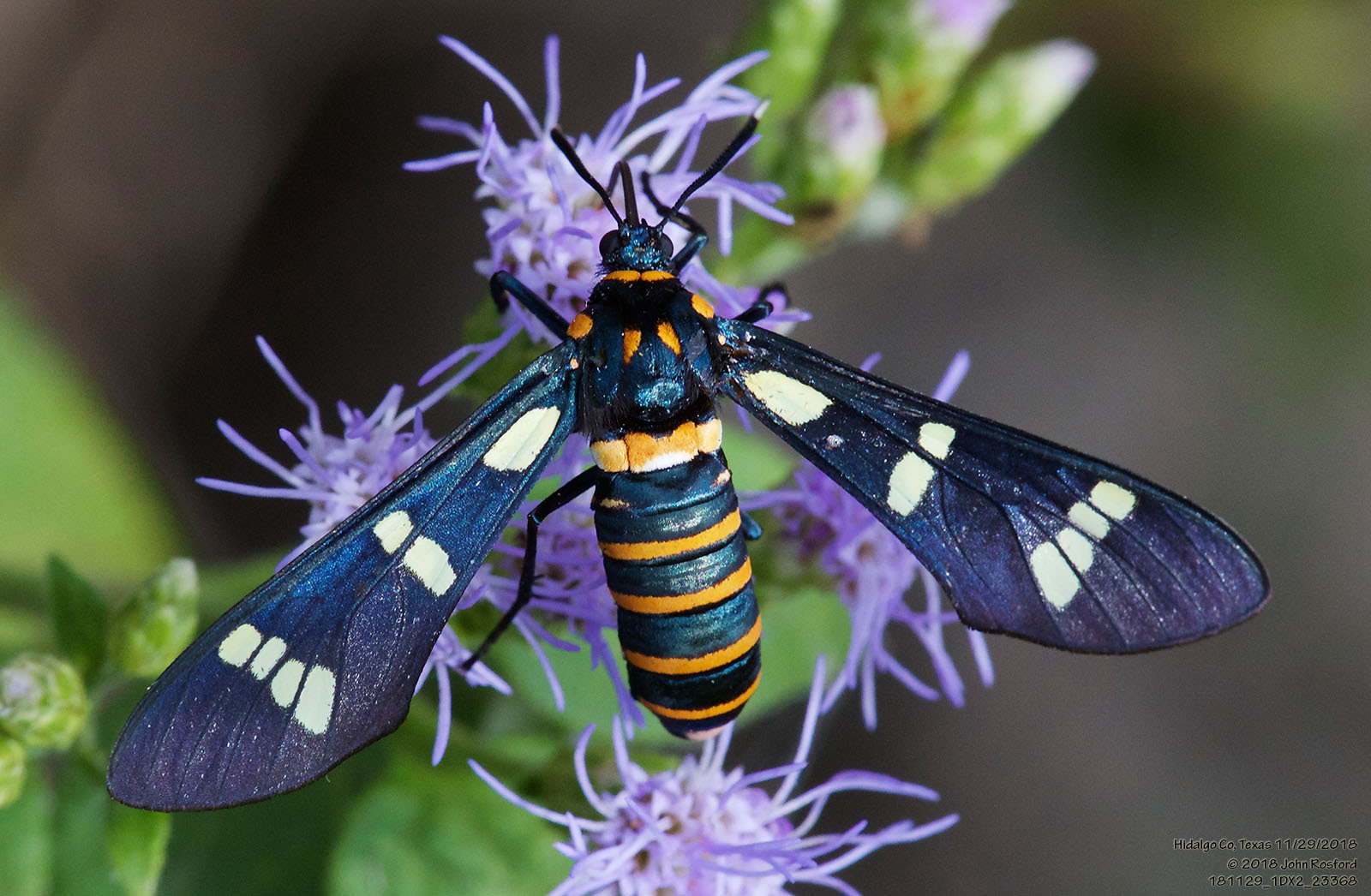

Scientific classification
- Domain: Eukaryota
- Kingdom: Animalia
- Phylum: Arthropoda
- Class: Insecta
- Order: Lepidoptera
- Superfamily: Noctuoidea
- Family: Erebidae
- Subfamily: Arctiinae
- Genus: Syntomeida
- Species: S. melanthus

Binomial name
- Syntomeida melanthus (Cramer, [1779])

Synonyms
- Sphinx melanthus Cramer, [1779]; Euchromia melanthus; Sphinx nycteus Stoll, [1780]; Euchromia apricans Walker, 1854; Syntomeida albifasciata Butler, 1876

= Syntomeida melanthus =

Species of moth

Syntomeida melanthus, the black-banded wasp moth, is a moth in the subfamily Arctiinae. It was described by Pieter Cramer in 1779. It is found in Arizona, southern and western Texas, the West Indies, Mexico, Guatemala, Costa Rica, Nicaragua, Honduras and Venezuela.

In the United States, adults have been recorded on wing from April to June and again from August to November.

The larvae feed on a wide range of plants, mostly in the Convolvulaceae.

== Subspecies ==
- Syntomeida melanthus melanthus
- Syntomeida melanthus albifasciata Butler, 1876 (Honduras, Mexico)
