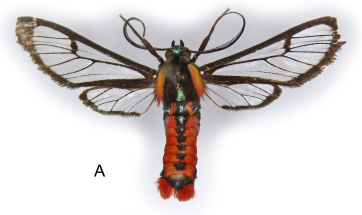
- Phoenicoprocta vacillans

Scientific classification
- Kingdom: Animalia
- Phylum: Arthropoda
- Class: Insecta
- Order: Lepidoptera
- Superfamily: Noctuoidea
- Family: Erebidae
- Subfamily: Arctiinae
- Genus: Phoenicoprocta
- Species: P. vacillans

Binomial name
- Phoenicoprocta vacillans (Walker, 1856)

Synonyms
- Eunomia vacillans Walker, 1856; Phoenicoprocta chrysorrhoea Hampson, 1898; Phoenicoprocta metachrysea H. Druce, 1898

= Phoenicoprocta vacillans =

Species of moth

Phoenicoprocta vacillans is a moth in the subfamily Arctiinae. It was described by Francis Walker in 1856. It is found in Colombia and the Brazilian states of São Paulo and Santa Catarina.
