= Syntomeida syntomoides =

Scientific classification
- Domain: Eukaryota
- Kingdom: Animalia
- Phylum: Arthropoda
- Class: Insecta
- Order: Lepidoptera
- Superfamily: Noctuoidea
- Family: Erebidae
- Subfamily: Arctiinae
- Genus: Syntomeida
- Species: S. syntomoides

Binomial name
- Syntomeida syntomoides (Boisduval, 1836)

Synonyms
- Glaucopis syntomoides Boisduval, 1836; Glaucopis saulcyi Guérin-Méneville, [1844]; Calonota niveifascia Walker, 1856; Glaucopis vidua Ménétriés, 1857; Glaucopis vidua var. spiracula Ménétriés, 1857; Syntomeida angasi Druce, 1884

Species of moth

Syntomeida syntomoides is a moth in the subfamily Arctiinae. It was described by Jean Baptiste Boisduval in 1836. It is found in Mexico as well as on Cuba, the Bahamas, Saint Lucia, Dominica, Barbados, and the French island of Martinique.
