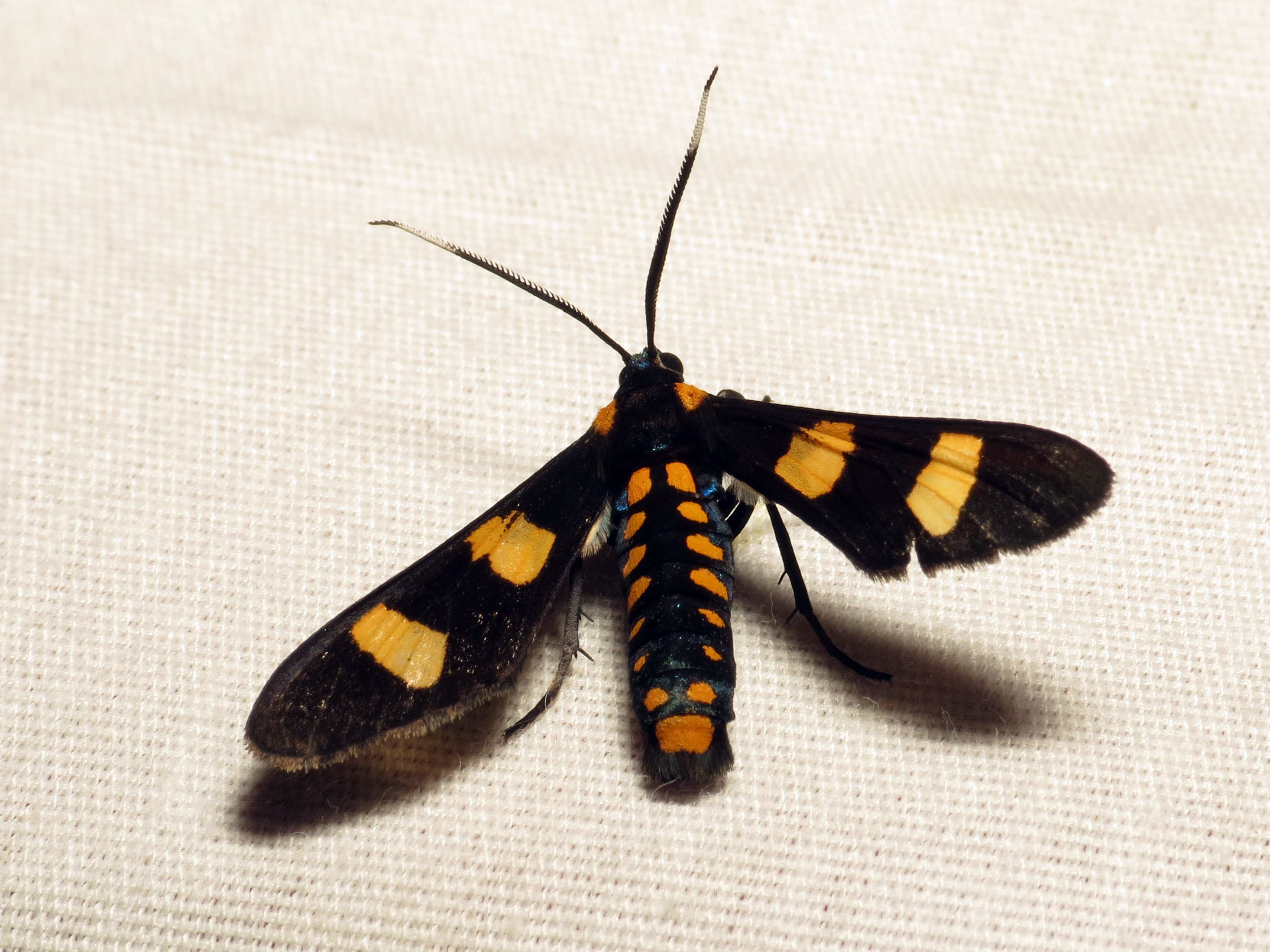

Scientific classification
- Domain: Eukaryota
- Kingdom: Animalia
- Phylum: Arthropoda
- Class: Insecta
- Order: Lepidoptera
- Superfamily: Noctuoidea
- Family: Erebidae
- Subfamily: Arctiinae
- Genus: Phoenicoprocta
- Species: P. hampsonii

Binomial name
- Phoenicoprocta hampsonii (Barnes, 1904)

Synonyms
- Syntomeida hampsonii Barnes, 1904; Syntomeida befana Skinner, 1906

= Phoenicoprocta hampsonii =

Species of moth

Phoenicoprocta hampsonii is a moth in the subfamily Arctiinae. It was described by William Barnes in 1904. It is found in the United States in south-eastern Arizona and in Mexico's Baja California.

The length of the forewings is about 17 mm. Adults are on wing from July to September.
