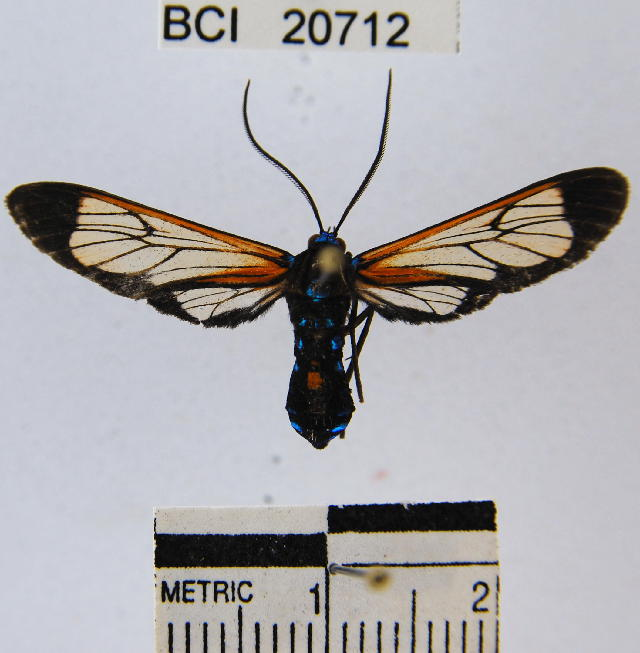
- Phoenicoprocta paucipuncta

Scientific classification
- Kingdom: Animalia
- Phylum: Arthropoda
- Class: Insecta
- Order: Lepidoptera
- Superfamily: Noctuoidea
- Family: Erebidae
- Subfamily: Arctiinae
- Subtribe: Euchromiina
- Genus: Phoenicoprocta; H. Druce, 1898

Synonyms
- Phoenicoprocta Hampson, 1898; Hyela Walker, 1854 (preocc. Stephens, 1850)

= Phoenicoprocta =

Genus of moths

Phoenicoprocta is a genus of tiger moths in the family Erebidae. The genus was erected by Herbert Druce in 1898.

== Species ==
- Phoenicoprocta analis Schrottky, 1909
- Phoenicoprocta astrifera (Butler, 1877)
- Phoenicoprocta capistrata (Fabricius, 1775)
- Phoenicoprocta haemorrhoidalis (Fabricius, 1775)
- Phoenicoprocta hampsonii (Barnes, 1904) (see former Syntomeida hampsonii)
- Phoenicoprocta jamaicensis (Schaus, 1901)
- Phoenicoprocta joda (Druce, 1897)
- Phoenicoprocta luisei Turrent Diaz, 2023
- Phoenicoprocta lydia (H. Druce, 1889) – Lydia tiger moth
- Phoenicoprocta mexicana (Walker, [1865])
- Phoenicoprocta partheni (Fabricius, 1793)
- Phoenicoprocta paucipuncta Dyar, 1914
- Phoenicoprocta rubiventer Hampson, 1898
- Phoenicoprocta sanguinea (Walker, 1854)
- Phoenicoprocta teda (Walker, 1854)
- Phoenicoprocta thera (H. Druce, 1889)
- Phoenicoprocta vacillans (Walker, 1856)
- Phoenicoprocta venadia (Schaus, 1920)
