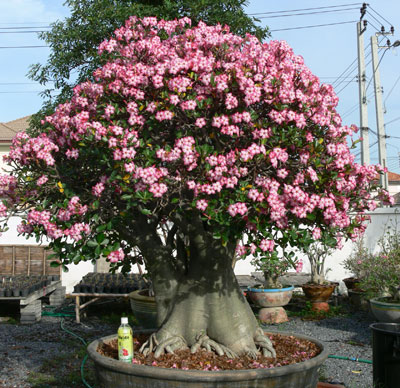
- A. arabicum trained as bonsai.

Scientific classification
- Kingdom: Plantae
- Clade: Tracheophytes
- Clade: Angiosperms
- Clade: Eudicots
- Clade: Asterids
- Order: Gentianales
- Family: Apocynaceae
- Genus: Adenium
- Species: A. arabicum

Binomial name
- Adenium arabicum Balf.f.

= Adenium arabicum =

Species of flowering plant

Adenium arabicum is a species of succulent plant commonly used for bonsai and cultivated for its shiny leaves, growth form and flowering characteristics. Common names include desert rose, elephant's foot, and Adanah bush. They are monoecious and self-sterile. A. arabicum is native to Yemen and Saudi Arabia.

The leaves of this species have a broad surface. Leaves also tend to be large and somewhat leathery in appearance. Growth form is squat and fat, with a definite caudex and without much differentiation between trunk and branches. Bark may appear a purplish to dark brown color. Flowers range from pink to reddish pink. They are tubular, often appear for 2-3 days, and may appear before the leaves.

A. arabicum prefers full sun, and is suitable for US hardiness zones 10 and 11.
