= Phoenicoprocta joda =

Scientific classification
- Kingdom: Animalia
- Phylum: Arthropoda
- Class: Insecta
- Order: Lepidoptera
- Superfamily: Noctuoidea
- Family: Erebidae
- Subfamily: Arctiinae
- Genus: Phoenicoprocta
- Species: P. joda

Binomial name
- Phoenicoprocta joda (H. Druce, 1896)

Synonyms
- Syntomedia joda H. Druce, 1896

Species of moth

Phoenicoprocta joda is a moth in the subfamily Arctiinae. It was described as Syntomeida joda by Herbert Druce in 1897 (originally with a misspelling of the genus). It is found in Mexico.

It was transferred to Phoenicoprocta in Turrent Diaz, 2023.
