= Biopiracy =

Harmful or unethical bioprospecting

Biopiracy is the unauthorized appropriation of knowledge and genetic resources of farming and indigenous communities by individuals or institutions seeking exclusive monopoly control through patents or intellectual property. While bioprospecting is the act of exploring natural resources for undiscovered chemical compounds with medicinal or anti-microbial properties, commercial success from bioprospecting leads to the company's attempt at protecting their intellectual property rights on indigenous medicinal plants, seeds, genetic resources, and traditional medicines.

Moreover, if biological resources and traditional knowledge are taken from indigenous or marginalized groups, the commercialization of their natural resource can harm communities. Despite the medicinal and innovative benefits of bioprospecting and biochemical research, the expropriation of indigenous land for their genetic resources without fair compensation inevitably leads to exploitation. Biopiracy can harm indigenous populations in multiple ways. Without proper compensation or reward for traditional knowledge of natural resources, the sudden increase in commercial value of the species producing the active compound can make it now unaffordable for the native people. In some cases, a patent filed by the western company could prohibit the use or sale of the resource by any individual or institution, including the indigenous group. With nearly one third of all small-molecule drugs approved by the U.S. Food and Drug Administration (FDA) between 1981 and 2014 being either natural products or compounds derived from natural products, bioprospecting or piracy is growing more significantly, especially in the pharmaceutical industry. Furthermore, the United Nations Educational, Scientific and Cultural Organization (UNESCO) mentions, in the context of intangible cultural heritage (ICH), that the medicinal traditions and knowledge of the Kallawaya communities in Peru have been affected by the lack of legal protection from pharmaceutical companies. A number of research projects are currently being developed on this subject, such as the research carried out using digital methods on the biopiracy of traditional medicines, which shows the current context of the problem by developing a description and analysis of the data, and by visualising and mapping the various organisations and actors in the social networks.

With the advancement of extraction techniques of genetic material in biochemistry and molecular biology, scientists are now able to identify a specific gene, which directs to enzymes capable of converting one molecule to another. This scientific breakthrough brings up the question of whether the organism containing the gene that has been modified through a series of tests and experiments should be accredited to the country of origin.

== History ==
=== Colonial implications ===
Biopiracy is intertwined with European colonialism due the nature of colonization. From the beginning, European explorers documented new plant species, with Christopher Columbus reporting the existence of rhubarb and other drugs to the Spanish crown during his first voyage to Hispaniola in 1492, . Europeans quickly recognized the value of New World plants for medicinal and commercial purposes, financing research expeditions to explore and identify foreign plants. However, because of the practical and commercial value of many of these new plants, information about their cultivation was closely guarded. Many indigenous populations refused to reveal information about precious natural resources to their colonizers, leading European naturalists to use a variety of tactics to pry these secrets, ranging from friendship and payment to espionage, threats, and outright violence. As European governments, joint-stock companies, and individual investors sought to exploit the New World's abundant natural resources for enormous profit, there were little debates over who owned nature. Thus, Europeans completely ignored any claims by indigenous groups to the land, its resources, and botanical knowledge, leaving these resources to whoever could win them by force.

Historian David Mackay argues that botanical knowledge was an integral component of European expansion during this period. The medicinal properties of plants like cinchona, which produced quinine that treated malaria, helped European colonizers penetrate the rainforests and jungles of South America and Africa. Colonial expansion was driven partially to bring the production of cash crops like coffee, rubber, tea, sugarcane, pepper, nutmeg, and cotton within the borders of individual empires. Without botanical expertise in identifying, cultivating, and transplanting rare plants, the commercialization of these plants on such a large scale, which motivated imperial expansion and the violence and destruction that came with it, would not have been possible.

European empires closely guarded their own plant monopolies against each other, which bred a small catalogue of incidents of state-sponsored biopiracy against colonial rivals. The Parisian Royal Academy of Sciences sponsored a 1735 expedition of Pierre Bouguer, Charles-Marie de La Condamine, and Louis Godin, which was initially intended to measure the meridian of the earth of the equator. However the expedition also provided an opportunity to smuggle valuable cinchona seeds out of Spanish controlled Peru, though none of the seeds prospered. In 1776 the French government paid Nicolas-Joseph Thiery de Menonville 6,000 Livres to break Spain’s monopolies on the cochineal beetle by smuggling it out of Oaxaca, Mexico. He succeeded and helped naturalize the beetle, along with the cactus it depended on, in the French colony of Saint-Dominque.

In 1876, the British government's India office commissioned Henry Wickham to collect rubber seeds in Brazil, and deliver them to the Kew Gardens in London. Wickham delivered over 70,000 seeds and while his own account of his journey likely exaggerates the danger, as there was no law Brazilian law specifically prohibiting the seeds export, his actions occurred after the British consul's official request for seeds was denied. Around 2,700 seeds successfully germinated, and were sent to British colonies in South-East Asia, specifically Ceylon and Malaya. Rubber production at plantations in these colonies quickly overtook production in South America, breaking the Amazonian monopoly and lowering prices. The competition destroyed the local economy is Brazil's rubber regions, as Brazilian harvesters could not compete with Asian plantations, causing an exodus of many investors.

The General Agreement on Tariffs and Trade (GATT) of 1947 was an effort to encourage international trade by reducing or eliminating trade barriers like tariffs or quotas. Trade-Related Intellectual Property Rights (TRIPS) was negotiated at the end of GATT. Similarly, Columbus set a precedent in 1492 through land titles granted by European kings and queens, which acted as a sort of patent for colonizers. The World Trade Organization (WTO) agreement of TRIPS attempts to signal the importance of maintaining a balance between trade and intellectual property. This agreement, since 1994, requires WTO member countries to develop legal frameworks to protect plant and animal resources in agricultural, pharmaceutical, chemical, textile, or other commodity contexts. Several countries have criticized this agreement, claiming that it's counterproductive in protecting their natural resources.

The Eurocentric roots of property claiming and piracy are reinforced by modern Intellectual Property laws established by GATT and WTO which supplements the colonial ideas to "discover and conquer" and to "subdue, occupy, and possess." Environmental activist and food sovereignty advocate Vandana Shiva calls patenting and claiming rights to genetic material and bio-resources "the second coming of Columbus" due to its reinforcement of colonial power dynamics. For example, the intellectual property for Indian products like tamarind, turmeric, and Darjeeling tea have been taken and patented by private corporations in historically colonial countries. More specifically, in 2010 The University of Mississippi attempted to patent curcumin, the active ingredient of turmeric powder, to create drugs used for wound healing without directly crediting Indian communities, where turmeric was traditionally used in medicine for treating wounds, infections and skin problems for centuries.

=== "Gene Rush" in Sri Lanka ===
The "Gene Rush" is the new era of biotechnology that allows scientists to extract specific genes from living organisms as raw materials. With the introduction of deoxyribonucleic acid (DNA) research, Sri Lanka has been marked with imminent danger as a target of biopiracy. Spotted in the top 34 biodiversity hotspots, Sri Lanka claims the highest biodiversity per unit area of terrestrial among Asian countries. Currently, Sri Lanka has 1,500 identified species of medicinal herbs and plants, and its attraction to biopiracy has put environment protection and conservation at a significant priority in the country. Recent efforts were enacted by United Nations Industrial Development Organization (UNIDO) in collaboration with the Spice Council and the government of Sri Lanka to enhance the productive capacities and competitiveness of the cinnamon value chain in the country.

=== Terminology ===
"Biopiracy" was coined in the early 1990s by Pat Mooney, founder of ETC Group which works to protect the world's most vulnerable people from socioeconomic and environmental impacts of new, modern technologies. He defines it as when researchers or research organizations take biological resources without official sanction, largely from less affluent countries or marginalized people. Biopiracy includes theft or misappropriation of genetic resources and traditional knowledge through the intellectual property system and unauthorized and uncompensated collection of genetic resources for commercial purposes. Mooney, along with other critics of the patent system, believes that the current intellectual property system creates inequities in the system by allowing wealthy and powerful groups of people to own the most basic building blocks of life.

== Intellectual property and international law ==
Intellectual property (IP) rights include patents, copyright, industrial design rights, trademarks, plant variety rights, trade dress, geographical indications, and sometimes trade secrets.

Intellectual property rights (IPR) were created to promote and reward scientific knowledge and creativity. However, they naturally weigh towards benefiting transnational corporations.

=== Restrictions in favor of corporations ===
Early intellectual property treaties were crafted in the late 19th century by European powers, and inherently ignored large parts of the impact of intellectual property on non-European peoples, cultures, and traditions.

In the late 20th century, more inequalities were added to the intellectual property system, representing a shift from common rights to private rights of knowledge. The preamble of TRIPS agreement acknowledges these rights as private rights. By privatizing intellectual commons, TRIPS encourages corporate monopoly.

A second restriction comes from the fact that IP rights are only recognized when they generate profit, rather than then when they meet social needs. The TRIPS agreement clarifies that an innovation must be capable of industrial profit in order to be recognized as an IPR, which discourages recognition of social good.

=== Legal framework against biopiracy in relation to genetic resources and traditional knowledge ===
In parallel, the international community has been working on different legal pathways to rebalance the intellectual property system in favour of indigenous peoples and local communities, in an attempt to address concerns related to biopiracy.

==== 1992–2010: Biodiversity Convention in Rio & Protocol in Nagoya ====
First elements related to genetic resources and traditional knowledge were included in the 1992 Convention on Biological Diversity (CBD). In 2010 (in force 2014), the Nagoya protocol to the CBD created actionable mechanisms to ensure a fair access and benefit-sharing (FABS or ABS) of genetic resources (GR).

==== 2023: High Seas Treaty in New York ====
In June 2023, the UN adopted the United Nations agreement on biodiversity beyond national jurisdiction (BBNJ Agreement), also called "High Seas Treaty". It concerns the conservation and sustainable use of marine biological diversity in areas beyond national jurisdiction, following maritime jurisdictions established under the United Nations Convention on the Law of the Sea.

==== 2024: GRATK Treaty in Geneva ====
Since 2001, the World Intellectual Property Organization through its Intergovernmental Committee on Intellectual Property and Genetic Resources, Traditional Knowledge and Folklore (IGC) has worked on several areas to bridge the gaps in international law in relation to biopiracy in genetic resources, traditional knowledge (TK), and traditional cultural expressions (TCE, formerly called "folklore").

The first output from the work of the IGC was a Diplomatic Conference, held in May 2024 to agree on a treaty for patent disclosures requirements in relation to "GR and Associated TK" (hence the treaty's acronym, GRATK). On 24 May 2024, the WIPO Diplomatic Conference finally adopted the "landmark" WIPO Treaty on Intellectual Property, Genetic Resources and Associated Traditional Knowledge (GRATK), which was signed by 30 countries on the day of its conclusion.

== Examples ==
Global biopiracy incidents
Incident	Place of Origin	Country engaged in piracy
Bitter melon (Momordica charantia)	Africa	USA
Turmeric (Curcuma longa)	Indian subcontinent and Southeast Asia	USA
Kothala Himbutu (Salacia reticulata)	Sri Lanka, Andaman Islands	Japan, USA, other European countries
Pongame oiltree (Pongamia glabra)	Asia, Australia, and the Pacific islands	Japan
Masbadda (Gymnema sylvestre)	Asia, Africa, and Australia	Japan
Heart-leaf Sida (Sida cordifolia)	India	Japan
Yellow Vine (Coscinium fenestratum)	India, Sri Lanka	Japanese, European, and USA pharmaceutical manufacturers
Neem (Azadirachta indica)	India, Nepal	USA-based W. R. Grace and Company
Common Bean (Phaseolus vulgaris)	South and Central America	USA
Rubber tree (Hevea brasiliensis)	Brazil	Britain
Hoodia plant (Hoodia gordonii)	Southern Africa	CSIR gave patent to Phytopharm and Pfizer
Kakadu Plum (Terminalia ferdinandiana)	Australia	USA
Aloe vera	Arabian Peninsula	USA

=== Neem tree ===
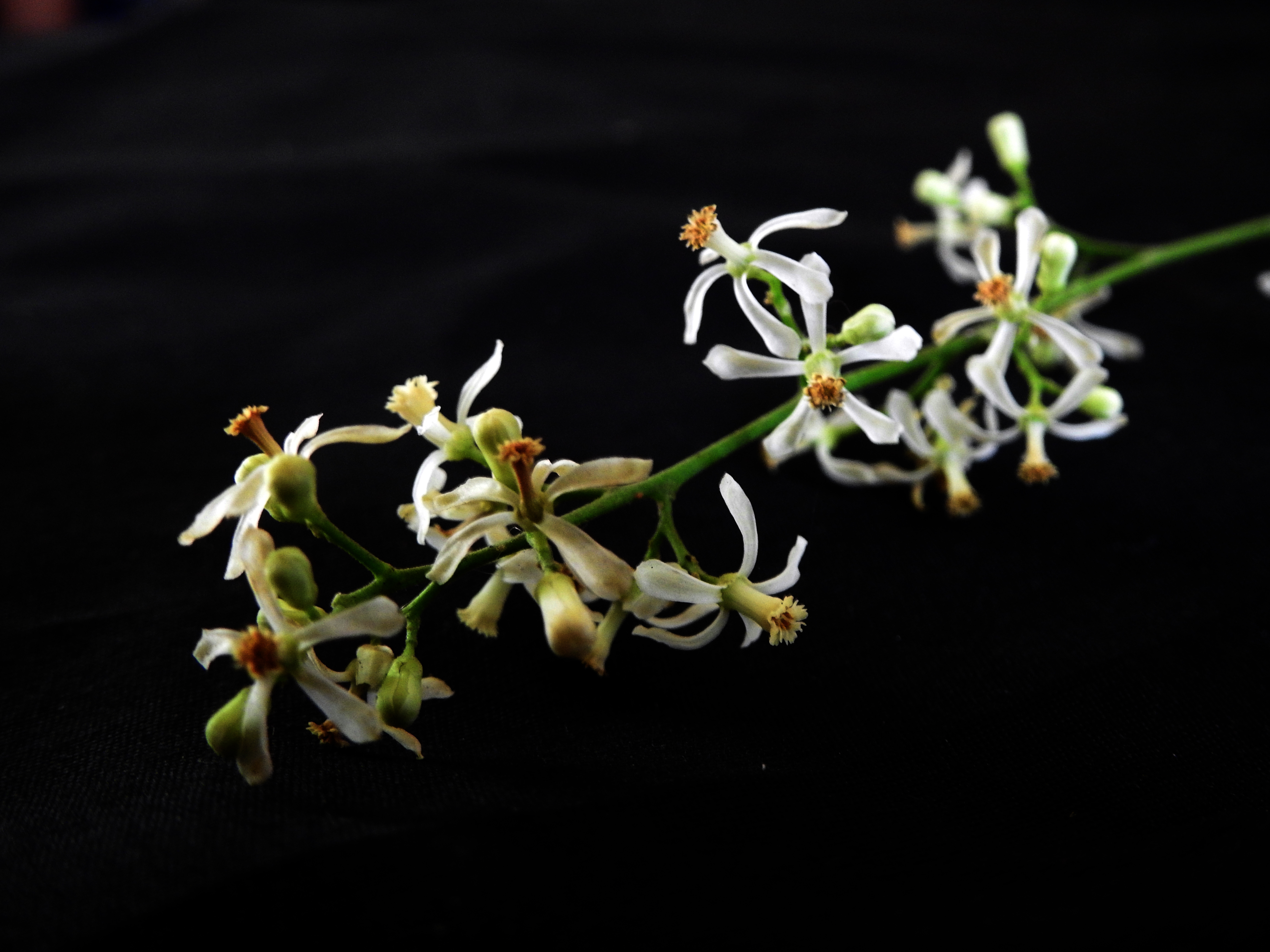
Azadirachta indica (Neem)

In the arid areas of India, the neem tree, or Azadirachta indica, is a fast-growing evergreen tree of up to 20 meters in height that contains a number of potent chemical compounds, including azadirachtin which can be found in the seeds. The neem tree has applications in medicine, toiletries, contraception, timber, fuel, and in agriculture. Historically, access to the neem tree's various products has been free or cheap. There are about 14 million neem trees in India, and the centuries old village technique used to turn the tree into a pesticidal emulsion does not require expensive equipment. Villagers relied on the large number of different medicinal compounds accessible through the neem material which was easily grown. When US timber importer Robert Larson noticed the tree's usefulness in 1971, he conducted research over the next decade on the pesticidal properties in the neem extract called Margosan-O. After gaining clearance for the product from the US Environmental Protection Agency (EPA) in 1985, he sold the patent for the product to W.R. Grace. While the corporation patented their neem tree oil antifungal spray, Neemex in 1994, neem extracts have been used by rural farmers in India for around 2,000 years.

==== Challenge against patent ====
India-based Research Foundation for Science, Technology, and Ecology (RFSTE) challenged the US patent with the claim that the qualities of the neem tree and their use had been known in India for over 2,000 years. The Congressional Research Service (CRS) reported to US Congress in justification of the patent claiming that the synthetic form or the process of synthesis of the naturally occurring compound should be patentable. The patent was finally overturned by the EPO in 2000. The village neem tree has become a symbol of Indian Indigenous knowledge and resistance against transnational corporations, and protestors against international property rights legislation carried twigs or branches of neem.

=== Hoodia ===
The Hoodia plant of the Kalahari Desert was used for thousands of years by the nomadic San people in southern Africa to help survive through hunger and thirst during their long expeditions in the desert. In 2016, the South African Council for Scientific and Industrial Research (CSIR) gained a government-funded patent for a new weight loss drug called (P57) derived from the plant. CSIR scientists isolated the P57 molecule in 1996 after decades of research on indigenous plants. The rights to the P57 patent were then sold to western pharmaceutical companies Pfizer and Phytopharm.

==== Challenge against patent ====
Following the confirmation of the patent, representatives of the San people, backed by the global support of patent-law critics and bioethicists, demanded restitution of their rights to their common intellectual property. After a long dispute, CSIR and the San people came to a confidential 'benefit-sharing' agreement where the San people were given royalties, knowledge exchange and creation of jobs from the industry.

=== Corporate greenwashing ===
Greenwashing is a term coined by environmentalist Jay Westervelt in 1986, meaning the false claims by companies that give the impression of sustainability and environmentalism. Without clarifying the metrics and quantifiable goal of the company's environmental agenda, many big companies attempt to paint the picture of ethical and eco-friendly images. Resources and materials pirated from indigenous communities are often commodified and recycled into corporate environmentalist agendas. Due to the exploitative nature of the fast fashion supply chain, many 'green' collections released by corporations only promote their marketing strategies and increase problems with textile waste and climate change.

Nike received backlash after the 2020 Impact Report which showed the lack of sustainability in footwear. To tackle the feedback, Nike launched the Happy Pineapple Collection featuring Ananas Anam's vegan leather material and a tropical fruit design embroidered across the Air Max 90, the Air Max 95, Air Force One, and Air-Zoom collections.

The Conscious Collection released by H&M in 2010 also partners with Ananas Anam to produce vegan leather jackets. Due to inconclusive data on Piñatex biodegradability, the Norwegian Consumer Authority accused the brand of misleading customers with vague details of the sustainability claims made. The brand responded by saying they would accept the criticism and communicate the extra value.

== New efforts ==
The Convention on Biological Diversity created by the United Nations in 1992 demanded that bioprospecting should not be done without the consent of the host country. The convention concluded that exploitation of local resources for medicinal and pharmaceutical purposes should actively involve local traditional communities and the produced profit and benefits be shared in an equitable way. It was made concrete by the 2010 Nagoya Protocol (NP), in which participating countries must give consent before biological material is collected or transferred. It had the unintended consequence of preventing biodiversity research in practice, as developing countries were reluctant to approve even basic research. Scientists doing work unrelated to bioprospecting have been imprisoned. The material transfer agreements (MTAs) were also processed slowly under NP, preventing natural history museums from doing routine exchanges, with added risk of material temporarily load to the origin country being permanently kept by refusing to issue a MTA.

The International Cooperative Biodiversity Group (ICBG) is a network of bioprospecting projects funded by the US government. While the main objective is to discover and research plants bearing chemical compounds that could cure diseases in the United States, the countries hosting the searches can expect equitable rewards and benefits. Local job creation in communities is promoted by conducting the initial extraction and analysis steps in local laboratories. If the research leads to commercialized drugs, 50% of the royalties are invested into community development funds run by indigenous people.

== See also ==
- Intellectual property
- Bioprospecting
- Greenwashing
- Neo-colonial science
