= Stefan Meiring Naudé =

South African scientist (1904–1985)

Stefan Meiring Naudé (31 December 1904, De Doorns–27 April 1985) was a South African scientist, chairman of the Simon van der Stel Foundation, and president of the Council for Scientific and Industrial Research (CSIR).

== Education ==
After completing his high school education, he attended Stellenbosch University where he earned an M.Sc. degree with distinction at the age of 21. He was awarded a Rhodes Scholarship to study at Oxford, but was unimpressed by the physics department there and declined the scholarship. He then moved to Berlin, where he studied under physicists such as Albert Einstein, Max Planck, and Max von Laue, earning his Ph.D. in 1928.

== Career ==
After his studies in Berlin, Naudé moved to Chicago to work with scientists like Robert Millikan and Arthur Compton.

From 1931 to 1933, Meiring Naudé was a senior lecturer at the University of Cape Town, where he worked under Basil Schonland. In 1932, he gained international recognition for his discovery of the nitrogen-15 isotope. In 1934, he accepted a position as a professor of physics at his alma mater and held it until 1945. The following year, Naudé became the director of the National Physics Laboratory and in 1950, he joined the Scientific and Industrial Research Council. He served as the President of the Council from 1952 to 1971. During this period, he was also the chairman of the Royal Society of South Africa from 1960 to 1961 and chairman of the South African Academy from 1967 to 1969. From 1971 to 1977, he was the Scientific Advisor to the Prime Minister of South Africa.

In addition to his scientific career, Naude was also active in the cultural sphere. On 13 November 1965 he was elected National Chairman of the Simon van der Stel Foundation. Today this foundation is known as the Heritage Association of South Africa, the largest and oldest conservation lobby group in South Africa dedicated to "conserving the national estate".
