= P57 =

P57 may refer to:

== Aircraft ==
- Partenavia P.57 Fachiro, an Italian civil utility aircraft
- Percival P.57 Sea Prince, a British anti-submarine trainer
- Tucker XP-57, a proposed American fighter

== Vessels ==
- HMS Universal (P57), a submarine of the Royal Navy
- INS Sunayna (P57), a patrol vessel of the Indian Navy
- P57 Kasos, a HSY-55-class gunboat of the Hellenic Navy

== Other uses ==
- P57 (glycoside), an anorectic
- BRM P57, a Formula One racing car
- Cyclin-dependent kinase inhibitor 1C
- Papyrus 57, a biblical manuscript
- P57, a state regional road in Latvia
