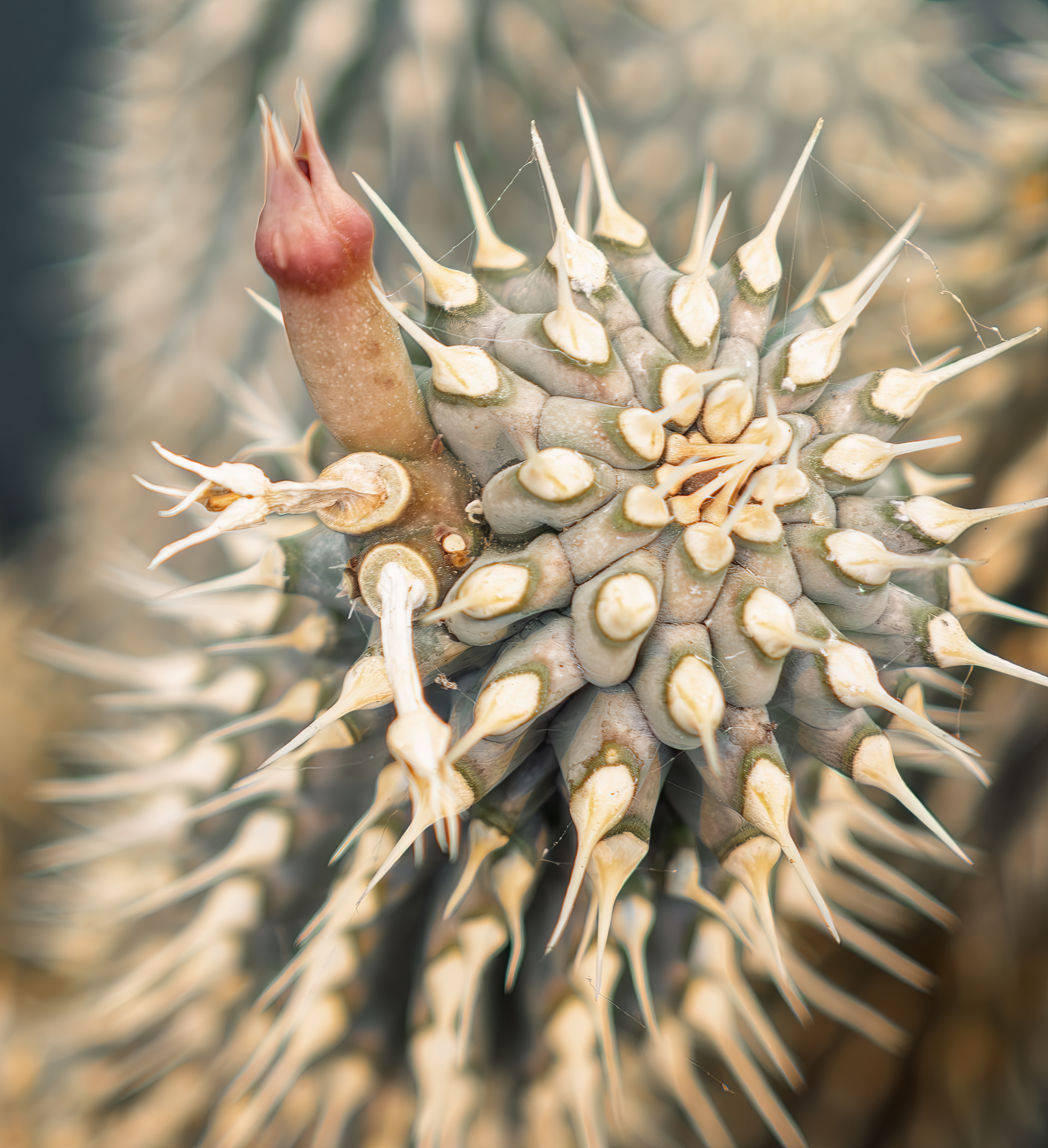

Scientific classification
- Kingdom: Plantae
- Clade: Tracheophytes
- Clade: Angiosperms
- Clade: Eudicots
- Clade: Asterids
- Order: Gentianales
- Family: Apocynaceae
- Genus: Hoodia
- Species: H. macrantha

Binomial name
- Hoodia macrantha Dinter

= Hoodia macrantha =

Species of succulent

Hoodia macrantha is a succulent plant native to Namibia and the Cape Province of South Africa. It is regarded by some sources as a synonym of the accepted name for the plant, Hoodia currorii subsp. currorii.
