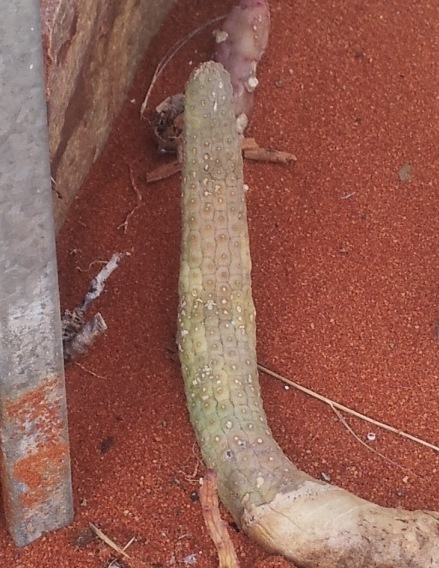

Conservation status
- Least Concern (IUCN 3.1)

Scientific classification
- Kingdom: Plantae
- Clade: Tracheophytes
- Clade: Angiosperms
- Clade: Eudicots
- Clade: Asterids
- Order: Gentianales
- Family: Apocynaceae
- Subfamily: Asclepiadoideae
- Tribe: Ceropegieae
- Genus: Lavrania; Plowes
- Species: L. haagnerae

Binomial name
- Lavrania haagnerae Plowes

= Lavrania =

Genus of plants

Lavrania is a monospecific genus of plants in family Apocynaceae. Its only species is Lavrania haagnerae, endemic to Namibia. Its natural habitat is rocky areas.

== Taxonomy ==
The genus and species were first described in 1986. Phylogenetic studies have shown the genus to be monophyletic, and most closely related to the stapeliad genus Hoodia. Marginally more distantly related is a sister branch of related genera including Larryleachia, Richtersveldia and Notechidnopsis.
