= African Centre for Gene Technologies =

South African research centre

Coordinates: 25.7523°S 28.2531°E

The African Centre for Gene Technologies (ACGT) (Pretoria) is located on the Experimental Farm of the University of Pretoria campus, and was established by Council for Scientific and Industrial Research (CSIR), the University of Pretoria, the University of the Witwatersrand, the University of Johannesburg and the Agricultural Research Council (ARC). The aim is to create a collaborative network of excellence in advanced biotechnology, with specific focus on the "-omics".

== History ==
ACGT is a product of the Southern Education and Research Alliance (SERA) and was established in 2001 as the SERA biotechnology task team. ACGT has since grown into a regional initiative.
