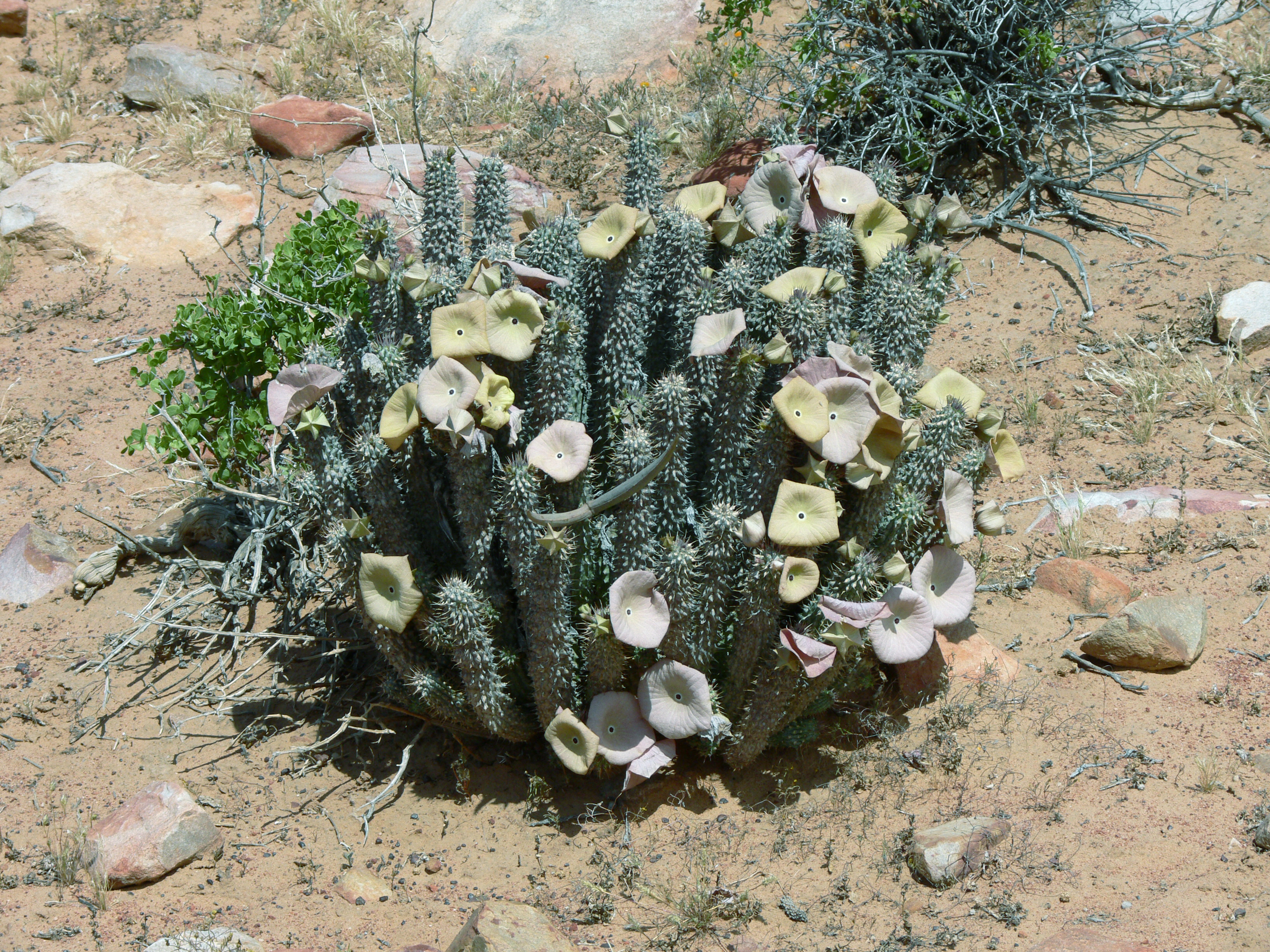
- Hoodia gordonii

Conservation status
- CITES Appendix II

Scientific classification
- Kingdom: Plantae
- Clade: Tracheophytes
- Clade: Angiosperms
- Clade: Eudicots
- Clade: Asterids
- Order: Gentianales
- Family: Apocynaceae
- Subfamily: Asclepiadoideae
- Tribe: Ceropegieae
- Genus: Hoodia; Sweet ex Decne.

= Hoodia =

Genus of flowering plants

Hoodia (/ˈhʊdiə/; known locally as "ghaap" or "bobbejaanghaap") is a genus of flowering plants in the family Apocynaceae, under the subfamily Asclepiadoideae, native to Southern Africa.

One species of Hoodia in particular, Hoodia gordonii, has achieved a degree of fame and controversy, after being investigated for use as a possible appetite suppressant.

== Description ==
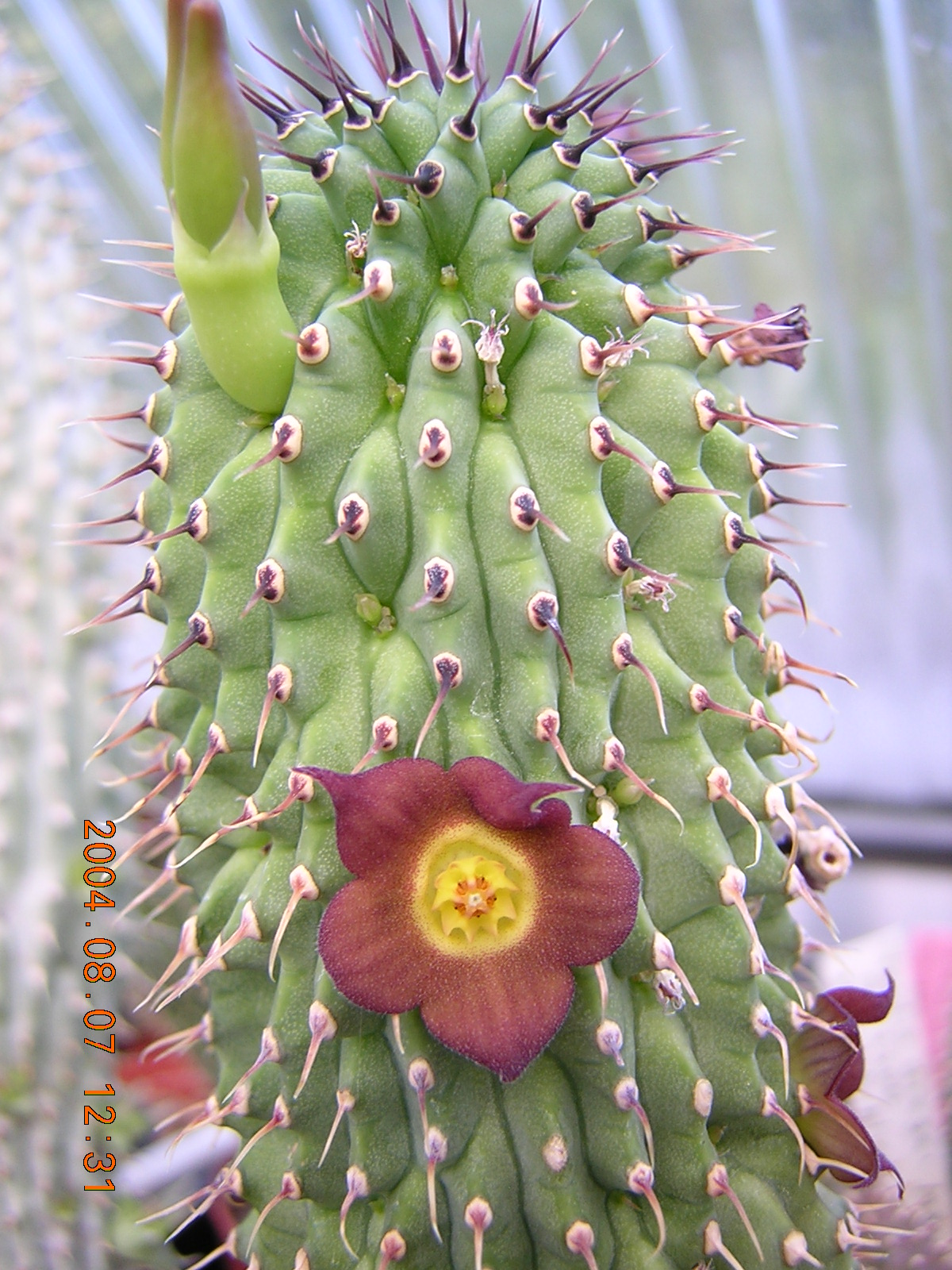
Hoodia officinalis

Hoodia macrantha

The group was first described as a genus in 1844.

Hoodia are stem succulents, described as "cactiform" because of their remarkable similarity to the unrelated cactus family. They have a branching, shrub-like form, and the largest species (Hoodia parviflora) can grow to the size of a tree — over 2 m (6 ft 7 in) in height.

The flowers are extremely variable in size — from less than 1 cm, to almost 20 cm in diameter, depending on the species. Flowers appear in large numbers, always near the tops of the stems. Those of larger-flowered species (such as Hoodia gordonii) are often a papery pink-tan colour, plate-shaped, with an unpleasant smell to attract their fly pollinators. The smaller, darker flowers of some species have a far stronger and more unpleasant smell than the larger flowers.

== Distribution ==
The genus Hoodia is restricted to the arid regions in the western part of southern Africa, ranging from western South Africa to central Namibia and as far north as southern Angola. It is especially common in the Namib desert and in the Orange River valley. Typical habitat is rocky slopes and open stone plains. Plants usually germinate in the shelter of bushes or rocks, but survive in the open as adult plants.

Species

1. Hoodia albispina - South Africa
2. Hoodia alstonii - South Africa
3. Hoodia bainii - South Africa
4. Hoodia barklyi - South Africa
5. Hoodia burkei - South Africa
6. Hoodia currorii - tropical Africa
7. Hoodia dregei - South Africa
8. Hoodia flava - South Africa
9. Hoodia gibbosa - Namibia
10. Hoodia gordonii - Namibia
11. Hoodia husabensis - Namibia
12. Hoodia juttae - Namibia
13. Hoodia langii - Botswana, Namibia, Cape Province
14. Hoodia lugardii - tropical Africa
15. Hoodia macrantha - Namibia
16. Hoodia montana - Brandberg in Namibia
17. Hoodia mossamedensis - Angola
18. Hoodia officinalis - Namibia, Cape Province
19. Hoodia parviflora - South Africa
20. Hoodia pedicellata - Namibia
21. Hoodia pilifera - South Africa
22. Hoodia rosea - Cape Province
23. Hoodia ruschii - Great Namaqualand in Namibia
24. Hoodia rustica - Cape Province
25. Hoodia triebneri - Namibia

Several of the small-flowered species of Hoodia were formerly in a separate genus, Trichocaulon ("ghaap"), but have been moved into the genus Hoodia, and the two groups are now synonymous. Phylogenetic studies have shown the genus Hoodia to be monophyletic, and most closely related to the stapeliad genus Lavrania. Marginally more distantly related is a sister branch of related genera including Larryleachia, Richtersveldia and Notechidnopsis.

== Uses and horticulture ==
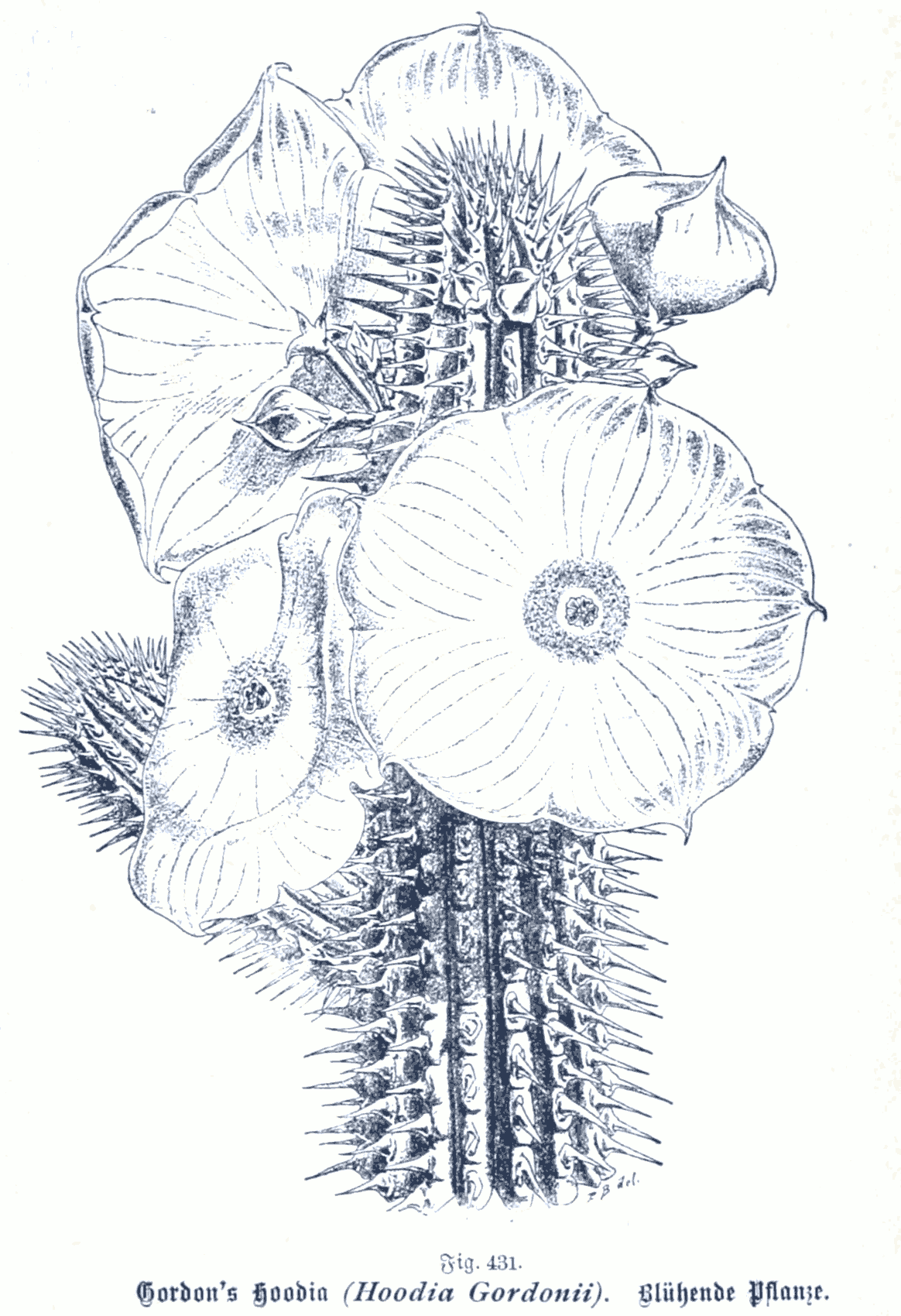
Hoodia gordonii

=== Supplement ===
Hoodia gordonii is traditionally used by the San people (Bushmen) of the Namib desert as an appetite suppressant as part of their indigenous knowledge about survival in the harsh desert conditions. In 2006, the plant became internationally known, after a marketing campaign falsely claimed that its use as a dietary supplement was an appetite suppressant for weight loss. As of 2018, there is no high-quality clinical research showing that hoodia has actions as an appetite suppressant or is effective for weight loss.

In a case of biopiracy, bioprospectors from South Africa's Council for Scientific and Industrial Research (CSIR) realized that the plant was marketable and patented its use as an appetite suppressant without recognizing the Sans' traditional claims to the knowledge of the plant and its uses. The patent was later sold to Unilever, which marketed hoodia products as diet supplements. In 2003, the South African San Council entered into a benefit sharing agreement with CSIR in which they would receive from 6 to 8% of the revenue from the sale of H. gordonii products, money which would be deposited in a trust for all San peoples across Southern Africa.

=== Horticulture ===
Several species are grown as garden plants, and one species, H. gordonii, is being investigated for use as an appetite suppressant. However, in 2008, UK-based Unilever PLC, one of the largest packaged-food firms in the world, abandoned plans to use hoodia in a range of diet products. In a document on Unilever's website entitled "Sustainable Development 2008: An Overview", signed by Paul Polman, CEO, Unilever states: "During 2008, having invested 20 million [pounds] in R&D, Unilever abandoned plans to use the slimming extract hoodia in a range of diet products. We stopped the project because our clinical studies revealed that products using hoodia would not meet our strict standards of safety and efficacy."

Many Hoodia species are protected plants. Hoodia is currently listed in Appendix II to the Convention on International Trade in Endangered Species of Wild Fauna and Flora (CITES), which includes species not currently considered endangered but are at risk if trade is not controlled.
