= Notechidnopsis =

Scientific classification
- Kingdom: Plantae
- Clade: Tracheophytes
- Clade: Angiosperms
- Clade: Eudicots
- Clade: Asterids
- Order: Gentianales
- Family: Apocynaceae
- Subfamily: Asclepiadoideae
- Tribe: Ceropegieae
- Genus: Notechidnopsis; Lavranos & Bleck
- Species: N. tessellata

Binomial name
- Notechidnopsis tessellata (Pillans ) Lavranos & Bleck

Genus of flowering plants

Notechidnopsis is a group of plants in the family Apocynaceae first described as a genus in 1985. It contains only one recognized species, Notechidnopsis tessellata, native to Cape Province in South Africa.

formerly included

moved to Richtersveldia

- Notechidnopsis columnaris (Nel) Lavranos & Bleck synonym of Richtersveldia columnaris (Nel) Meve & Liede

Taxonomy

Phylogenetic studies have shown this genus to most closely related to the stapeliad genera Richtersveldia and Larryleachia. Marginally more distantly related is a sister branch of related genera including Lavrania and Hoodia.
