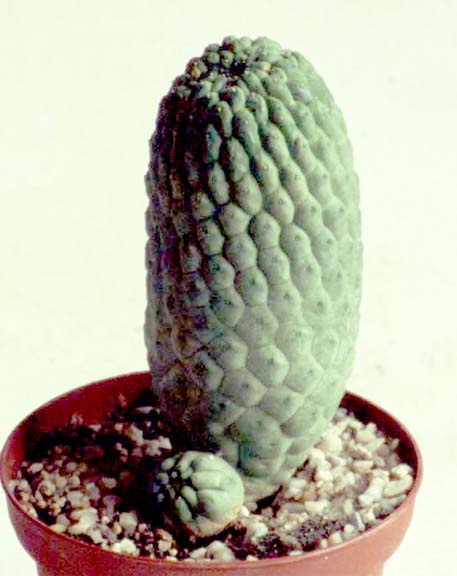
- Larryleachia cactiformis

Scientific classification
- Kingdom: Plantae
- Clade: Tracheophytes
- Clade: Angiosperms
- Clade: Eudicots
- Clade: Asterids
- Order: Gentianales
- Family: Apocynaceae
- Subfamily: Asclepiadoideae
- Tribe: Ceropegieae
- Genus: Larryleachia; Plowes

Synonyms
- Leachia Plowes (non Cassini)

= Larryleachia =

Genus of plants

Larryleachia is a genus of stapeliad succulent flowering plants in the family Apocynaceae.

Species

- Larryleachia cactiformis (Hooker) Plowes
- Larryleachia marlothii (N.E. Brown) Plowes
- Larryleachia perlata (Dinter) Plowes
- Larryleachia picta (N.E.Brown) Plowes
- Larryleachia tirasmontana (Plowes) Plowes

Taxonomy

Phylogenetic studies have shown the genus to be monophyletic, and most closely related to the stapeliad genera Richtersveldtia and Notechidnopsis. Marginally more distantly related is a sister branch of related genera including Lavrania and Hoodia.
