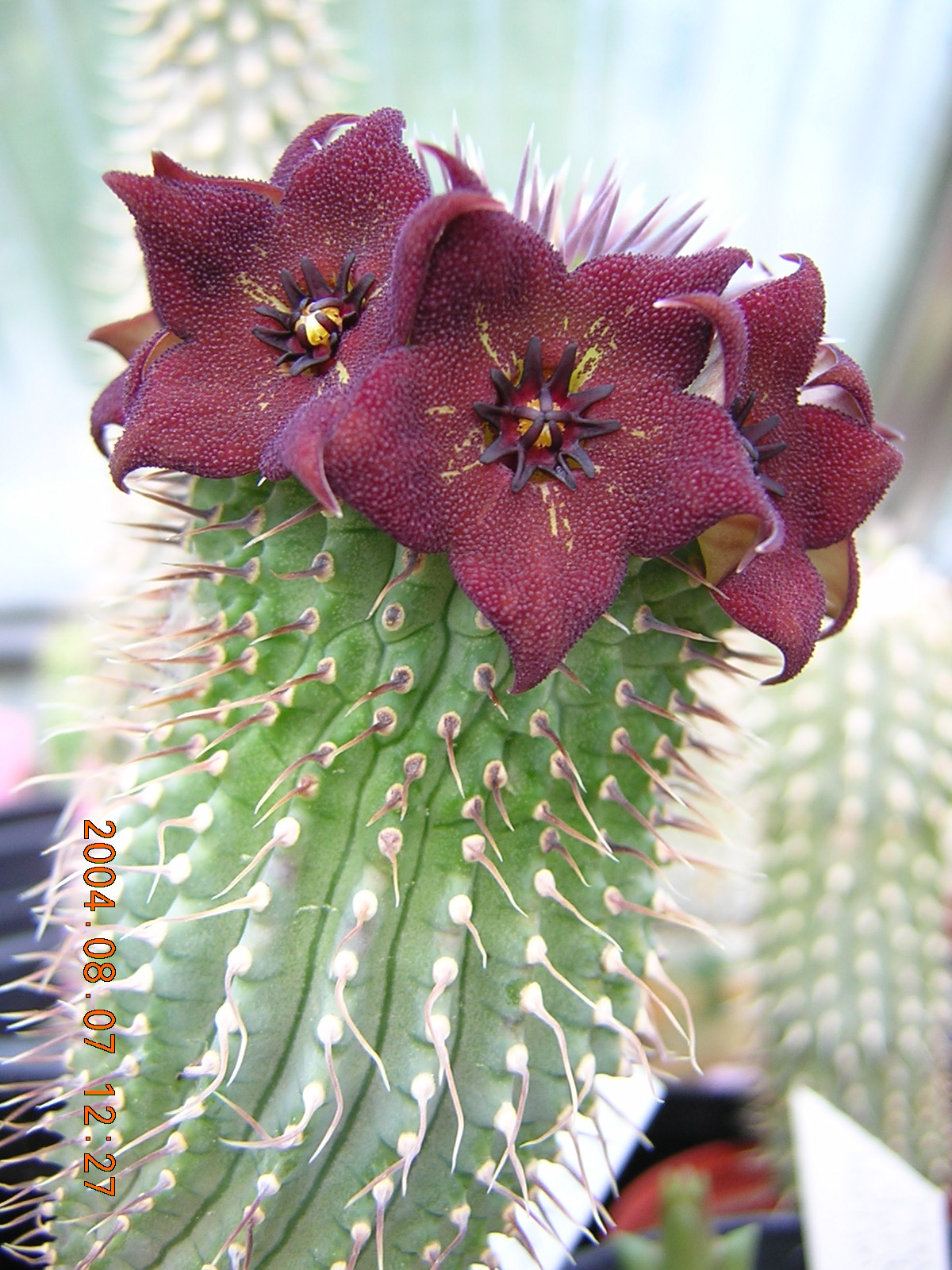

Conservation status
- Least Concern (IUCN 3.1)

Scientific classification
- Kingdom: Plantae
- Clade: Tracheophytes
- Clade: Angiosperms
- Clade: Eudicots
- Clade: Asterids
- Order: Gentianales
- Family: Apocynaceae
- Genus: Hoodia
- Species: H. ruschii

Binomial name
- Hoodia ruschii Dinter

Synonyms
- Ceropegia ruschii (Dinter) Bruyns

= Hoodia ruschii =

Species of plant

Hoodia ruschii is a species of stem succulent plant in the family Apocynaceae. It is endemic to Namibia. Its natural habitats are rocky areas and cold desert.

== Description ==
Hoodia ruschii reaches about 1/2 meter in height and has stout, grayish green stems covered in sharp, hard spines. It bears deep reddish-brown flowers which are medium-sized.
