= Larryleachia tirasmontana =

Conservation status
- Least Concern (IUCN 3.1)

Scientific classification
- Kingdom: Plantae
- Clade: Tracheophytes
- Clade: Angiosperms
- Clade: Eudicots
- Clade: Asterids
- Order: Gentianales
- Family: Apocynaceae
- Genus: Larryleachia
- Species: L. tirasmontana

Binomial name
- Larryleachia tirasmontana (Plowes) Plowes

Species of plant

Larryleachia tirasmontana is a species of plant in the family Apocynaceae. It is endemic to Namibia. Its natural habitat is cold desert.
