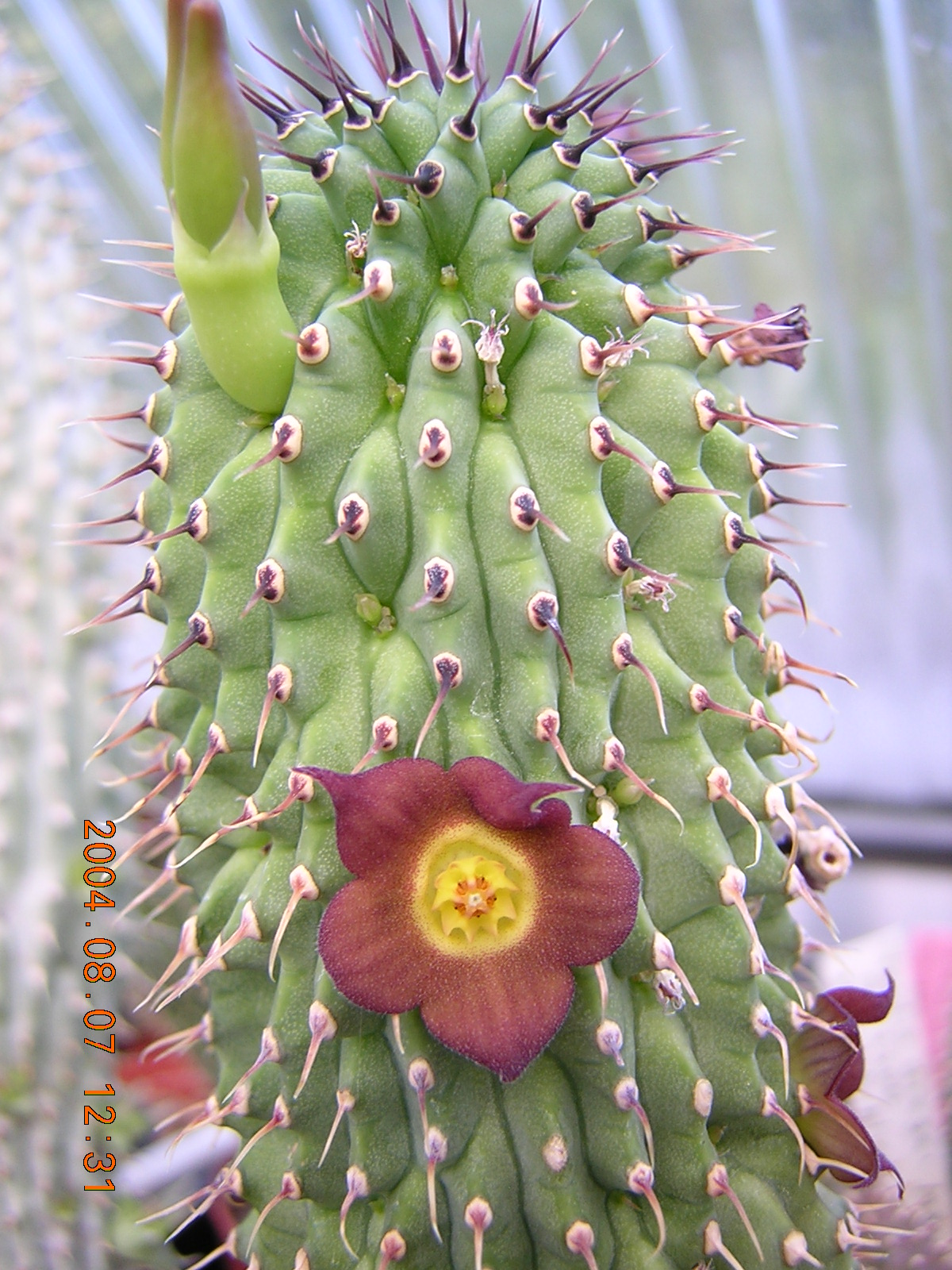

Scientific classification
- Kingdom: Plantae
- Clade: Tracheophytes
- Clade: Angiosperms
- Clade: Eudicots
- Clade: Asterids
- Order: Gentianales
- Family: Apocynaceae
- Genus: Hoodia
- Species: H. officinalis

Binomial name
- Hoodia officinalis (N.E.Br.) Plowes

= Hoodia officinalis =

Species of succulent

Hoodia officinalis is a succulent plant native to Namibia and the Cape Province of South Africa. H. officinalis has two officially recognized subspecies, H. officinalis subsp. officinalis and subsp. delaetiana, which are identified mainly by their distribution. Subsp. delaetiana grows only in the Klinghardt Mountains and are larger than subsp. officinalis.

== Description ==
Hoodia officinalis is a smaller Hoodia species which grows to twenty to forty centimeters in height.
