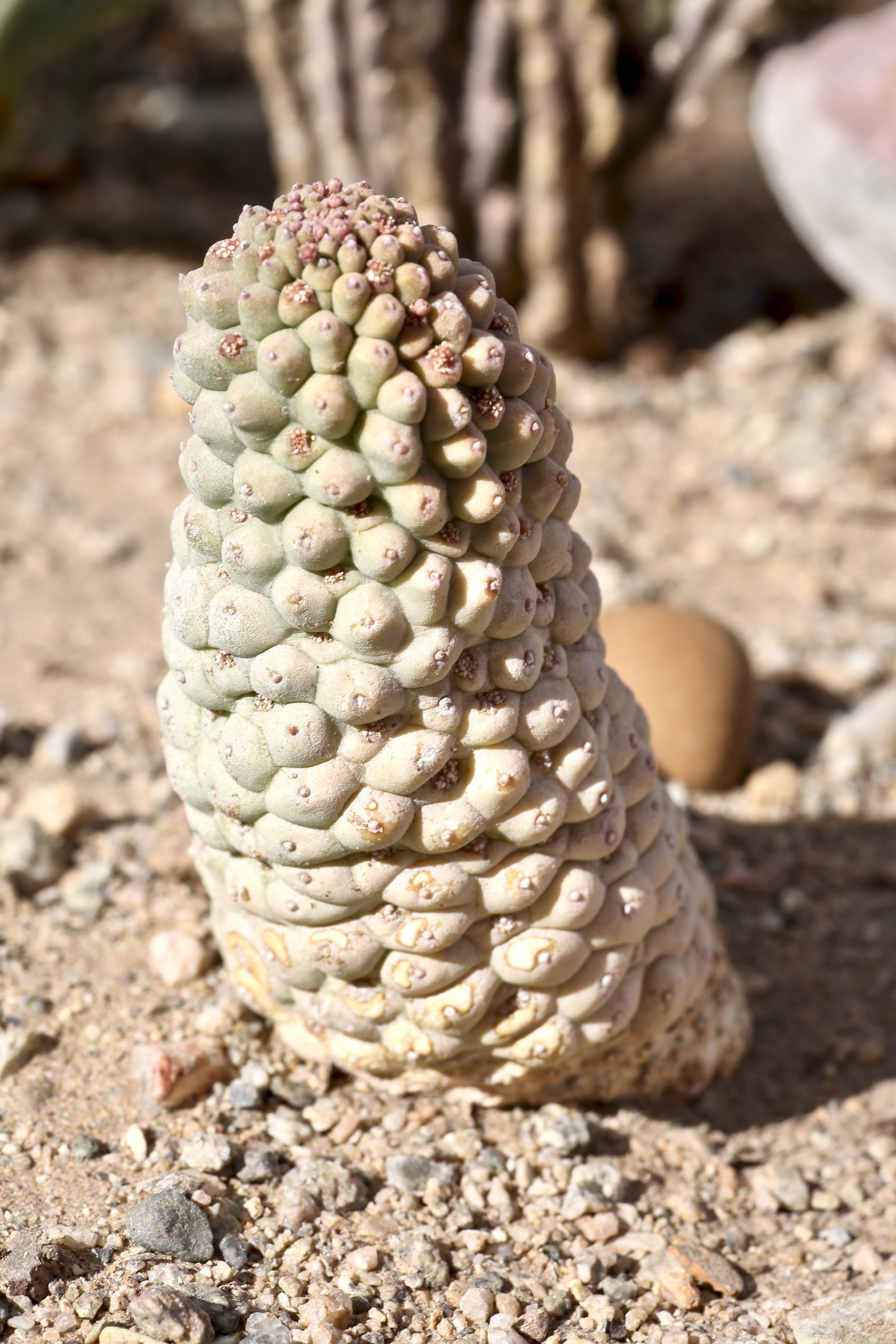

Scientific classification
- Kingdom: Plantae
- Clade: Tracheophytes
- Clade: Angiosperms
- Clade: Eudicots
- Clade: Asterids
- Order: Gentianales
- Family: Apocynaceae
- Genus: Larryleachia
- Species: L. perlata

Binomial name
- Larryleachia perlata (Dinter) Plowes

Synonyms
- Ceropegia perlata; Hoodia perlata; Lavrania perlata; Leachia perlata; Leachiella perlata; Trichocaulon cinereum; Trichocaulon kubusanum; Trichocaulon kubusense; Trichocaulon perlatum; Trichocaulon truncatum

= Larryleachia perlata =

Species of flowering plant

Larryleachia perlata is a species of flowering plant the family Apocynaceae. The species is a succulent plant species. The species is considered an insufficiently known species.

The plant can get up to 30 cm tall and the stems can be 2.5 cm to 6 cm.

The species is native to South Africa and Namibia. It occurs on both sides of the Orange river.

The species is threatened by erosion and overgrazing.
