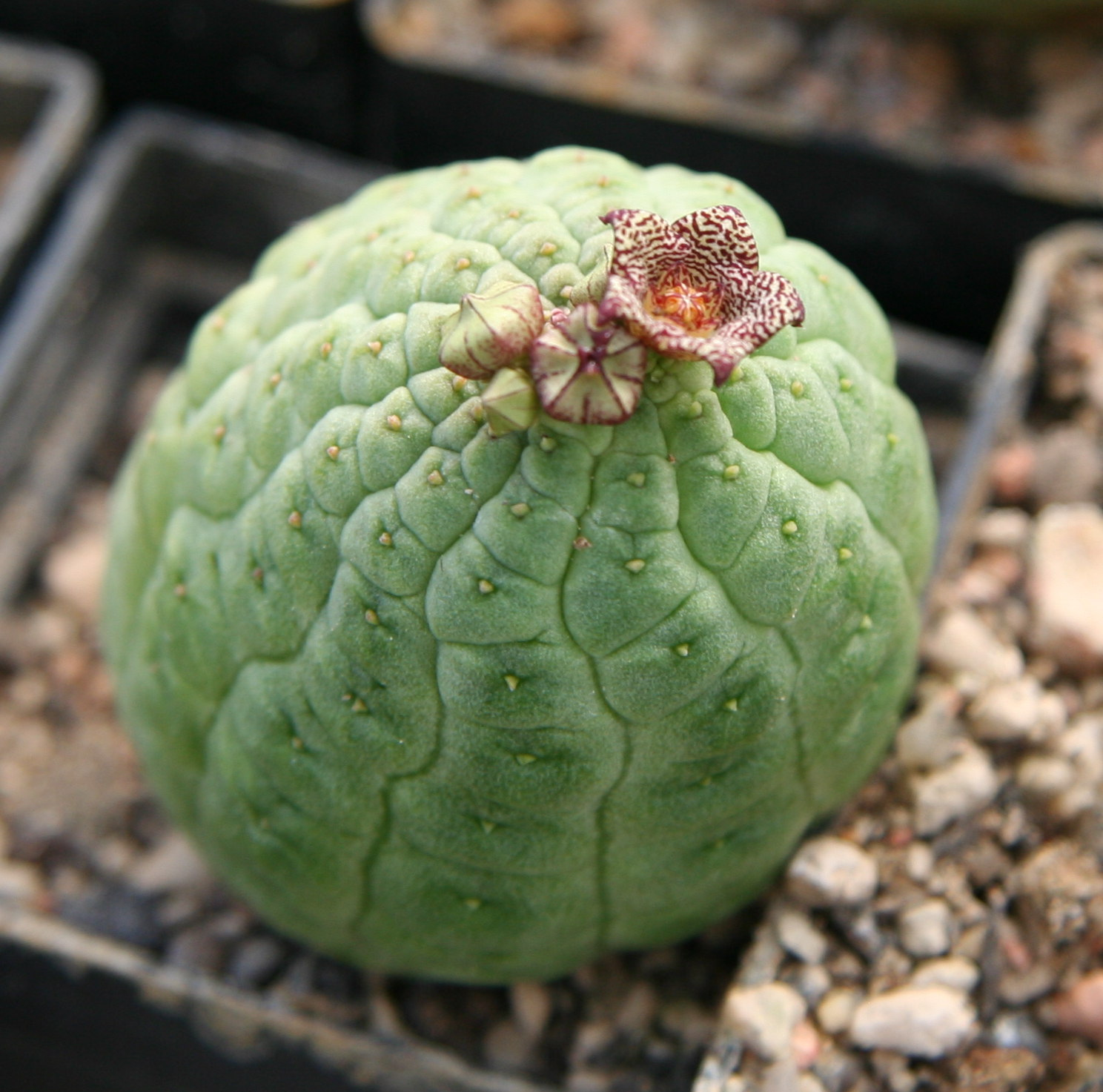

Conservation status
- Least Concern (SANBI Red List)

Scientific classification
- Kingdom: Plantae
- Clade: Tracheophytes
- Clade: Angiosperms
- Clade: Eudicots
- Clade: Asterids
- Order: Gentianales
- Family: Apocynaceae
- Genus: Larryleachia
- Species: L. cactiformis

Binomial name
- Larryleachia cactiformis (Hook.) Plowes

= Larryleachia cactiformis =

Species of flowering plant

Larryleachia cactiformis (also known as the cactus barrel milkweed) is a stapeliad succulent, native to the Richtersveld and Namaqualand in South Africa, where it grows in rocky areas. Larryleachia cactiformis proves as difficult a member of the family Apocynaceae in cultivation as others in its genus.

== Description ==
True to its name, Larryleachia cactiformis grows in the shape of a small cactus, with no leaves, spines or branches but ribbed with mammillae on 4-6 sided protrusions. It is greyish green in colour and starts spherical, then grows into a short cylindrical stem of 4-6 inches high, and sometimes taller in captivity. The flowers grow from 0.2 to 0.6 inch peduncles from the top, and are 1 inch in diameter when open. The corolla is pale yellow, fleshy, five pointed, shrivelled on the inside and decorated with dark red spots and lighter red tips. Seeds are flat and brown.

=== Varieties ===
The species has two varieties:

- Larryleachia cactiformis var. cactiformis (Hook.) Plowes
- Larryleachia cactiformis var. felina (D.T.Cole) Bruyns

== Distribution and habitat ==
Larryleachia cactiformis is found in the Richtersveld and in the Bushmanland region of Namaqualand in the Northern Cape, from Sendelingsdrift to Garies. It is found amongst Fynbos and Succulent Karoo vegetation on quartz hills on the Kamiesberge.

== Cultivation ==
The usual problems for cultivation of Larryleachia apply to L. cactiformis, primary of these being the need for year- round warmth and sunlight, and the dangers of root rot and mealy bugs. Grafting L. cactiformis onto a rootstock tuber of a Ceropegia, such as Ceropegia woodii, and treating the plants against root mealy bugs should mostly alleviate these issues, though propagation is still a problem as the plant does not offset or seed readily and grows difficultly and slowly from seedling.
