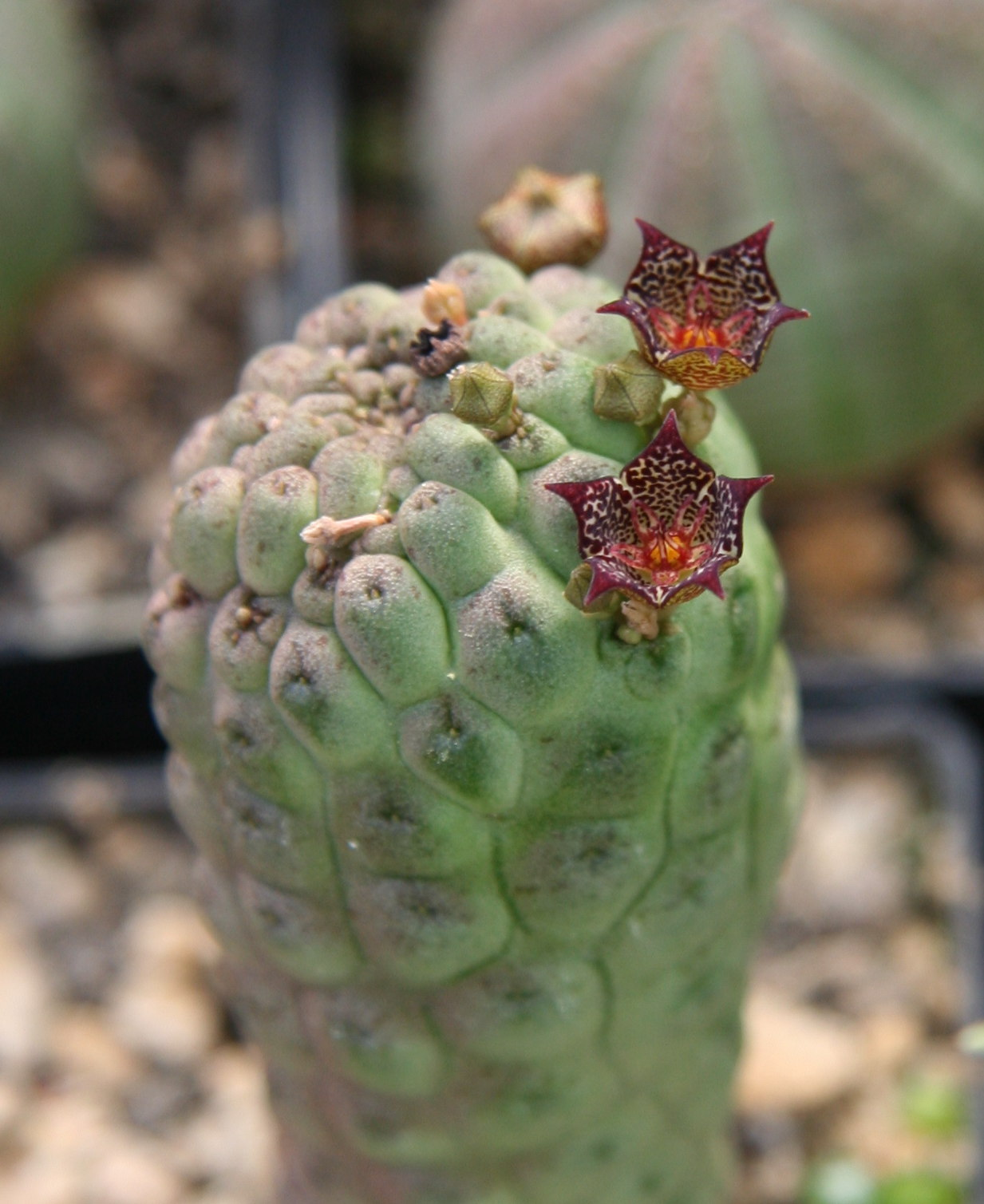

Scientific classification
- Kingdom: Plantae
- Clade: Tracheophytes
- Clade: Angiosperms
- Clade: Eudicots
- Clade: Asterids
- Order: Gentianales
- Family: Apocynaceae
- Genus: Larryleachia
- Species: L. marlothii

Binomial name
- Larryleachia marlothii (N.E.Br.) Plowes

= Larryleachia marlothii =

Species of flowering plant

Larryleachia marlothii is a summer-flowering succulent plant native to Namibia and southern Angola.

== Description ==
Grey-green and sometimes brown, Larryleachia marlothii grows as a separate, cylindrical stem of up to 6 inches tall spiralled with 12–19 ribs of blunt mammillae. Flowers appear in the summer and feature a dark, spotted, 5-pointed corolla and a distinct cross shape in the centre.

== Cultivation ==
Larryleachia marlothii can be grown as a graft on Ceropegia tubers. It must be kept in a brightly lit location throughout the winter.
