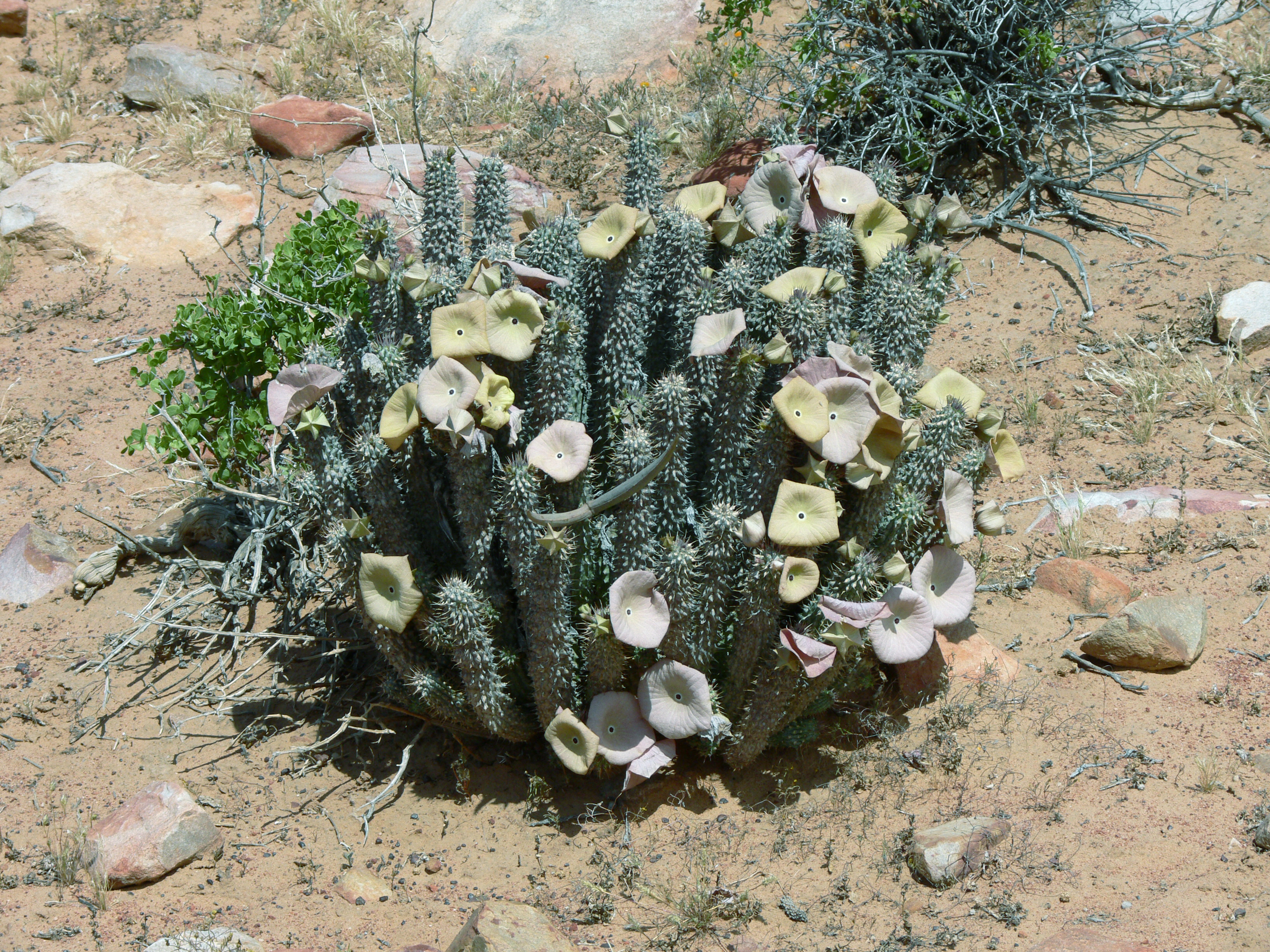
- In the Biedouw Valley, Cederberg
- CITES Appendix II

Scientific classification
- Kingdom: Plantae
- Clade: Tracheophytes
- Clade: Angiosperms
- Clade: Eudicots
- Clade: Asterids
- Order: Gentianales
- Family: Apocynaceae
- Genus: Hoodia
- Species: H. gordonii

Binomial name
- Hoodia gordonii (Masson) Sweet ex Decne., 1844

= Hoodia gordonii =

Species of succulent plant

Hoodia gordonii, also known as Bushman's hat, is a leafless spiny succulent plant claimed to have therapeutic properties in folk medicine. It grows naturally in Botswana, South Africa and Namibia. The species became internationally known and threatened by collectors, after a marketing campaign falsely claimed that it was an appetite suppressant for weight loss. The flowers smell like rotten meat and are pollinated mainly by flies. The indigenous San people of the Namib desert call this plant ǁhoba (pronounced [kǁʰɔbɑ] – the initial sound is a lateral click).

== Description ==
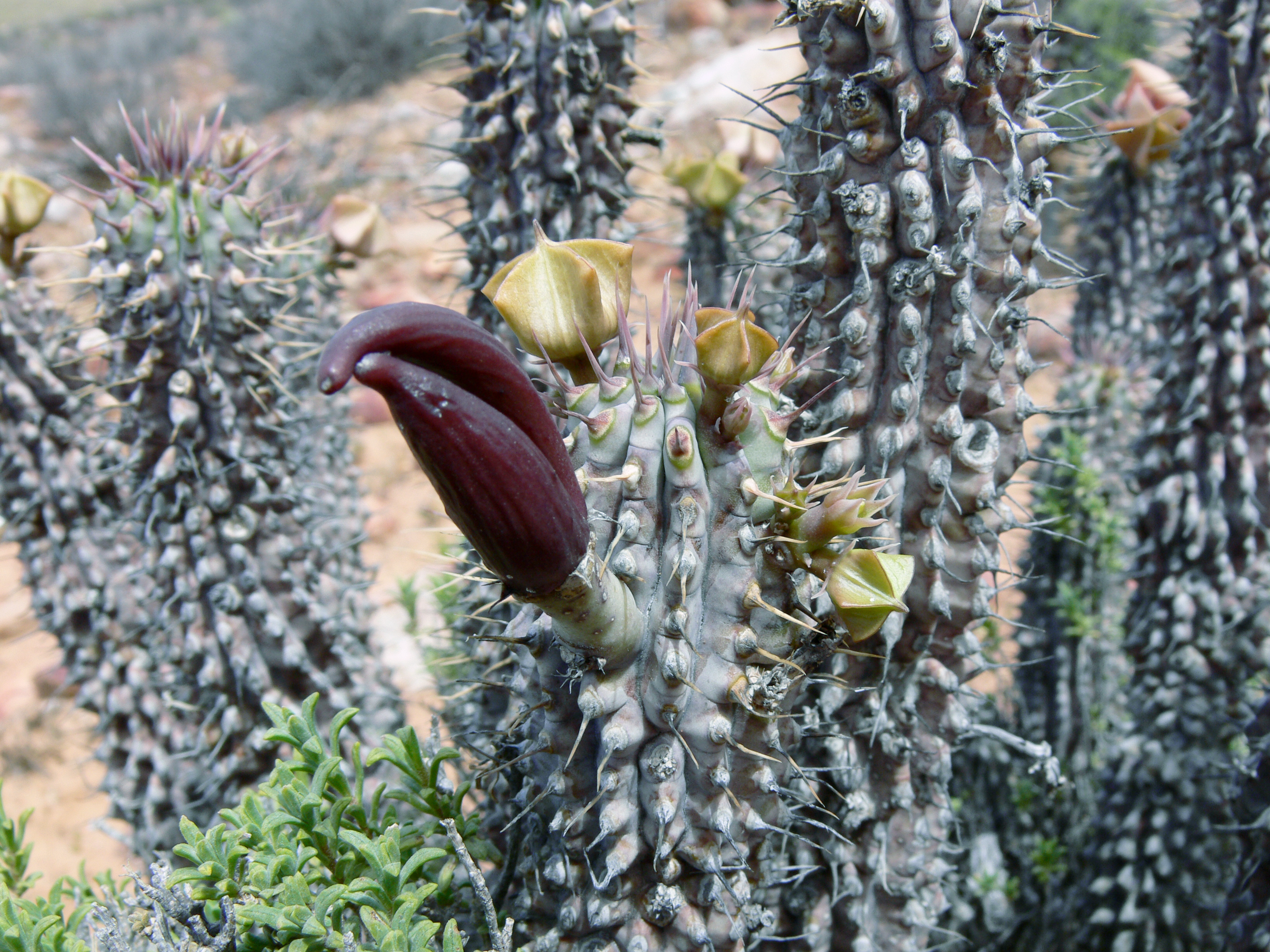
Fruit and flower buds. Biedouw Valley, Cederberg.

Hoodia gordonii is a clump-forming perennial succulent plant growing to around 1 metre tall, with up to 50 grey-green ribbed and spined stems in a clump. The flowers are up to 7.5 cm diameter; they have a five-lobed corolla, but appear circular after opening as the lobes curl back behind the flowers; they vary from pale straw-yellow to pink to dark reddish-purple. The flowers smell of rotting meat, and are pollinated by flies attracted to the smell. The fruit is a two-horned capsule, which splits open when mature to release the seeds. The seeds have a fluffy pappus and are wind-dispersed.

== Potential properties ==
The genus became internationally known and threatened by collectors, after a marketing campaign falsely claimed that it was an appetite suppressant for weight loss. Folk medicine practitioners indigenous to Southern Africa believed the plant to be an appetite suppressant and to have other medicinal properties, such as treating indigestion and small infections.

In 1977, the South African Council for Scientific and Industrial Research (CSIR) isolated the ingredient in hoodia—now known as P57—which may be responsible for its putative appetite-suppressant effect, and patented it in 1996. The CSIR then granted United Kingdom-based Phytopharm a license, and they collaborated with the pharmaceutical company Pfizer to isolate active ingredients from the extracts and look into synthesizing them for use as an appetite suppressant. Pfizer released the rights to the primary ingredient in 2002. Paul Hutson, associate professor in the University of Wisconsin–Madison School of Pharmacy, told the Wisconsin State Journal, "For Pfizer to release something dealing with obesity suggests to me that they felt there was no merit to its oral use." Pfizer states that development on P57, the active ingredient of hoodia, was stopped due to the difficulty of synthesizing it. Jasjit Bindra, lead researcher for hoodia at Pfizer, states there were indications of unwanted effects on the liver caused by other components, which could not be easily removed from the supplement, adding, "Clearly, hoodia has a long way to go before it can earn approval from the Food and Drug Administration. Until safer formulations are developed, dieters should be wary of using it."

In 2002, CSIR officially recognized the San tribespeople’s rights over hoodia, allowing them to take a percentage of the profits and any spin-offs resulting from the marketing of hoodia. H. gordonii is protected under Appendix II of the Convention on International Trade in Endangered Species (CITES) meaning international trade (including in parts and derivatives) is regulated by the CITES permitting system.

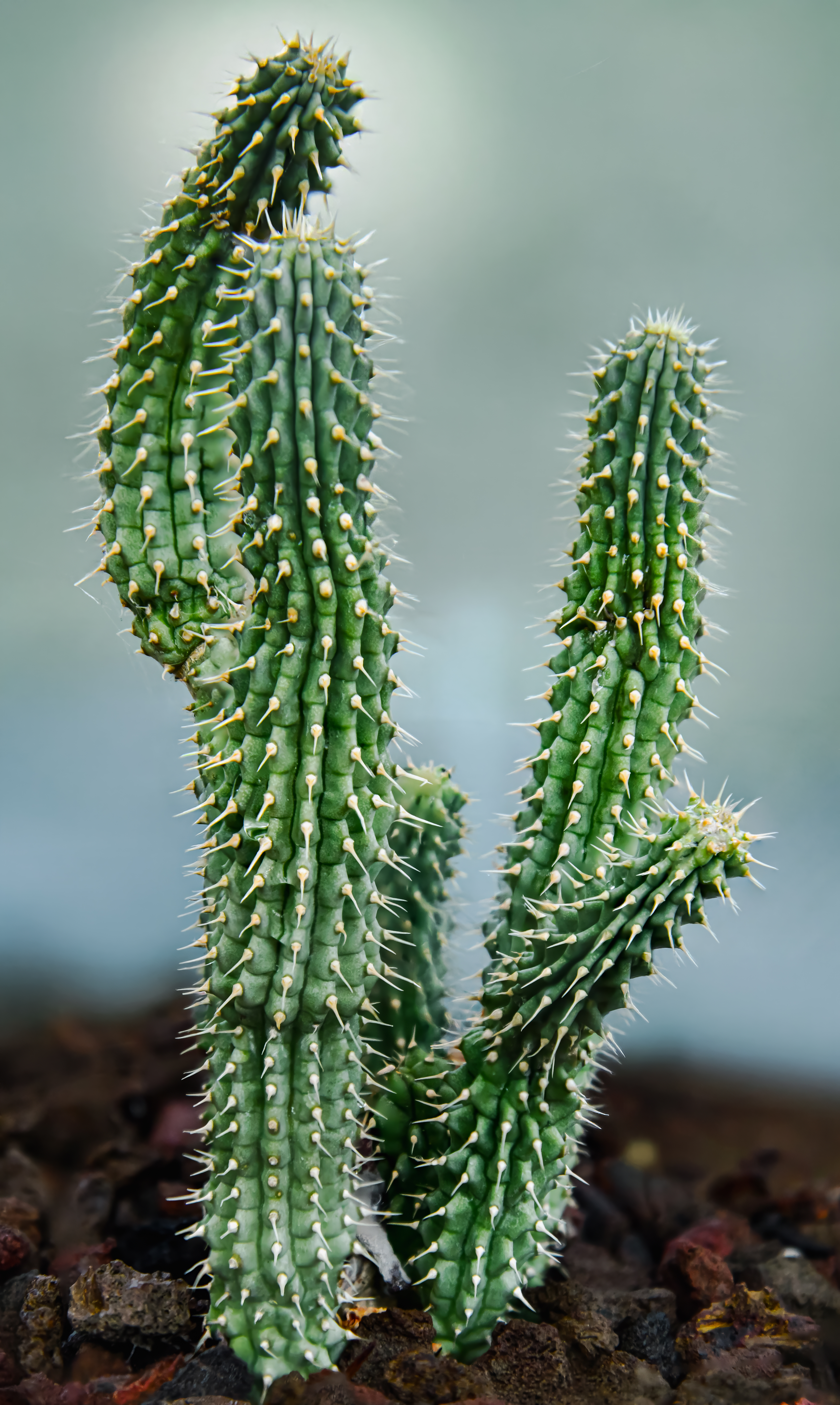
Hoodia gordonii Greenhouses of MNHT

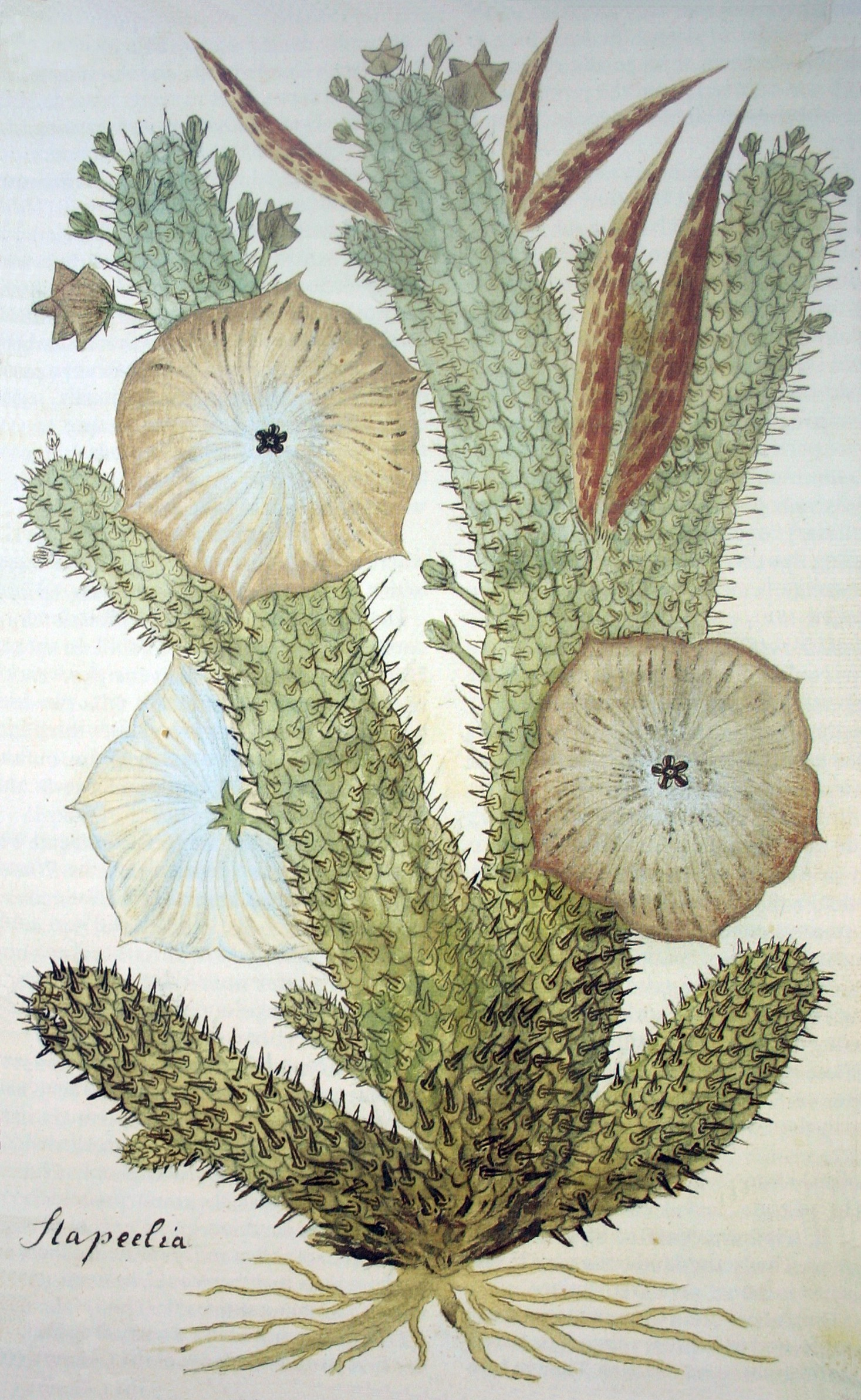
Painting of H. gordonii by Robert Jacob Gordon

=== Research ===
According to a 2006 review, no published scientific evidence supported hoodia as an appetite suppressant in humans. One review suggested that any weight loss effects from consuming hoodia dietary supplements may simply be secondary symptoms of potentially serious adverse effects that may occur from using it. The United States Federal Trade Commission recommends against the use of such diet products marketed with exaggerated claims for losing body weight through the use of dietary supplements, skin patches or creams.

=== Authentication ===
As H. gordonii and the whole genus Hoodia are threatened with extinction if international trade is not monitored, the genus is listed under CITES at Appendix II, and it is illegal to export plant material in any form from Africa without a CITES certificate being issued by proper authorities.

In the USA, the Fish and Wildlife Service, United States Department of Agriculture, and United States Customs and Border Protection regulate the importation and re-exportation of species such as H. gordonii. Current U.S. laws stipulate that not only must a CITES certificate accompany shipments, but also the importers must possess a permit issued by the USDA to import terrestrial plants. A CITES re-export certificate is needed to re-export H. gordonii.

The primary testing methods for authenticating H. gordonii are:

- HPTLC
- HPLC
- Microscopy /DPI
- Direct assay of the active component, "P57"

As of 2007, four independent labs are conducting tests to verify H. gordonii in consumer products. They are: Advanced Laboratories, Inc. in Smithfield, North Carolina, Alkemist Pharmaceuticals, Chromadex Labs of Irvine, California, and the University of Mississippi. The American Herbal Products Association completed work in 2009 establishing the de facto industry standard for authentication in response to scrutiny by the Federal Trade Commission of the hoodia industry and complaints by consumers of fraudulent hoodia products being marketed.

=== Media coverage ===
The BBC reported on the H. gordonii plant in 2003. On November 21, 2004, 60 Minutes aired a report on the effectiveness of the plant as a natural appetite suppressant.

The media coverage and heavy marketing by nutritional supplement companies have created such a demand for Hoodia spp. plants that a protected status was imposed in several countries, such as Namibia. Many products claiming to contain Hoodia spp. do not actually contain the active ingredient alleged to suppress appetite. An ongoing review of hoodia pills by Alkemists Pharmaceuticals found at least half of the products advertised as containing hoodia contained none.

In March 2006, Consumer Reports investigated the dietary supplement and concluded, "This weight loss drug lacks the clinical evidence for the Consumer Reports experts to recommend this product."

=== Marketing and spam ===
Lack of scientific evidence or regulatory approvals have not stopped dietary supplement companies from marketing H. gordonii supplements with claims that it can reduce appetite and cause weight loss. Goen Technologies Corporation's TrimSpa unit began marketing it under the brand name X32 with celebrity spokesperson Anna Nicole Smith, though the FDA has notified Trimspa in a Warning Letter that it has not demonstrated that claims for their product are scientifically supportable. Health Canada has not approved any hoodia products for sale. However, they are sold in natural health stores. Goen Technologies was sued by the state of New Jersey for misleading consumers. The Trimspa brand was the subject of a lawsuit in California, which claims it does not contain any of hoodia's active ingredient.

In December 2004, Unilever entered into an agreement with Phytopharm to start marketing H. gordonii commercially in the form of shakes and diet bars, although as of April 2007, no products have yet surfaced on the consumer market from that venture. In 2008 Unilever pulled out of their deal with Phytopharm to continue commercial development of hoodia. A document on Unilever's website entitled "Sustainable Development 2008: An Overview", and signed by Paul Polman, CEO, contains the following statement: "Innovation also carries uncertainties and does not always lead to a positive outcome. During 2008, having invested 20 million [pounds] in R&D, Unilever abandoned plans to use the slimming extract from the hoodia plant in a range of diet products. We stopped the project because our clinical studies revealed that products using hoodia would not meet our strict standards of safety and efficacy." Page 12.

Between March and June 2006, millions of e-mail spam and forum messages were sent out concerning hoodia, ostensibly offering hoodia extracts for weight control purposes. The Federal Trade Commission logged numerous complaints of consumer fraud associated with hoodia.

In October 2009, Santa Cruz County District Attorney Bob Lee joined colleagues from several other counties in a lawsuit against three companies that allegedly made false claims that their diet supplements contain an extract from the African hoodia plant. The lawsuit, filed in Solano County, stated that Dex L-10 by Delmar Labs, Breakthrough Engineered Nutrition and Geopharma produce products with packaging and advertising that claim to contain H. gordonii when they contained little or none of it.
