= Southern Education and Research Alliance =

- Abbreviation: SERA
- Formation: 1999
- Type: Research alliance
- Location: Pretoria, South Africa
- Members: University of Pretoria, CSIR
- Relationship Managers: Thulani Dlamini (CSIR); Stephanie Burton (University of Pretoria)
- Website: www.seralliance.com

The Southern Education and Research Alliance (SERA), founded in 1999, is a strategic alliance formed between the University of Pretoria and the Council for Scientific and Industrial Research. The alliance collaborates locally and internationally with universities, NGO's, companies and multinational bodies in various research areas. Sera has a 50% shareholding in the Innovation Hub, a fully accredited technology park situated on 60 hectares of the university's experimental farm.

== Background ==
The alliance partners have identified a number of areas of common interest, ability and capacity. Within these areas, themes have been identified and task teams have been put together to explore the possibility of co-operation. Education, research, market related activities, intellectual property and venturing are to be the focus of this co-operation. The teams have examined the current reality and market opportunities in each of these fields, and have developed proposals for a variety of activities, such as the joint offering of graduate programmes, the development of joint institutes or centres of expertise and ad hoc projects .

Venturing opportunities have been referred to SERA (Pty) Ltd, a company that was set up as the technology exploitation branch of the alliance. Its primary focus is the pursuit of the best, most profitable means of bringing technologies to the market through venturing, commercialisation and the protection and exploitation of intellectual property.

The strategic alliance continually seeks synergies and domains of mutual benefit for both organisations. A number of benefit schemes, including a staff study rebate scheme, an undergraduate bursary scheme, extraordinary professorships, the appointment of fellows and continuing education benefits for both partners have evolved from the alliance.

== The Innovation Hub ==
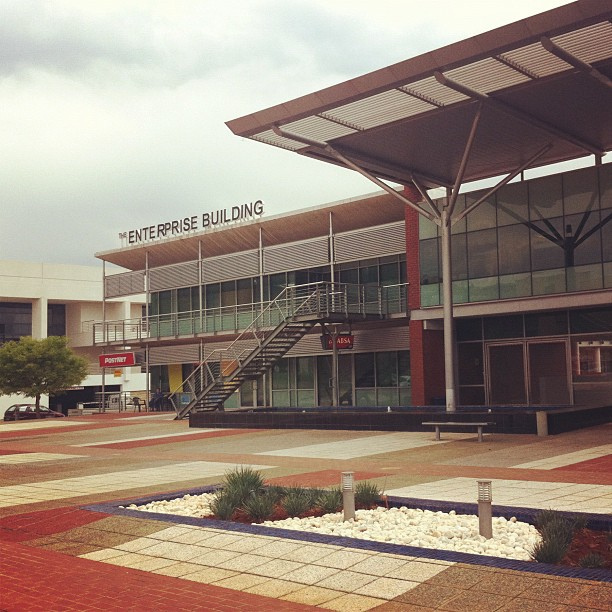
Innovation Hub

SERA and the Gauteng Provincial Government (GPG) agreed to establish The Innovation Hub through the Blue IQ initiative, a multi-billion rand initiative of the provincial government to invest in the development of economic infrastructure in identified mega projects in tourism, smart industries and high value-added manufacturing, to create a "smart" province. The Innovation Hub is South Africa and Africa's first internationally accredited science and technology park and is a member of the International Association of Science Parks.

The Innovation Hub is situated on a knowledge axis between the University of Pretoria and the CSIR on the university's experimental farm. The Innovation Hub offers an environment conducive for technology-driven businesses and high-technology entrepreneurs, and attracts anchor tenants, stimulate research and development and provide incubators for start-up businesses. The development will include the establishment of a high-technology incubator. This partnership aims to create a new dimension that combines the strengths of the university and the CSIR with those of business and the government in order to stimulate economic activity and offer opportunities to commercialise local, innovative technologies.

SERA (Pty) Ltd has a 50% shareholding in The Innovation Hub Management Company (Pty) Ltd and The Innovation Hub Incubator Company (Pty) Ltd and is the sole owner of SERA Hub Investments (Pty) Ltd. Negotiations for the establishment of a venture fund are ongoing, while both the university and the CSIR have subscribed to the formation of the new Department of Trade and Industry Innovation Fund.

== Projects ==
- African Centre for Gene Technologies (ACGT) was established in 2001 as the SERA biotechnology task team. ACGT has since grown into a regional initiative.
