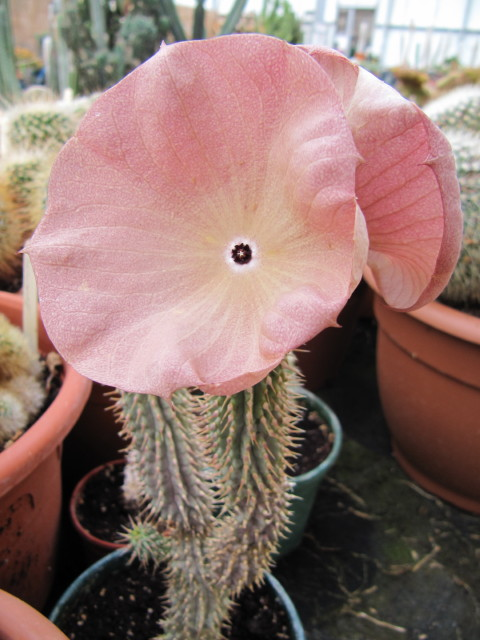

Conservation status
- Least Concern (IUCN 3.1)

Scientific classification
- Kingdom: Plantae
- Clade: Tracheophytes
- Clade: Angiosperms
- Clade: Eudicots
- Clade: Asterids
- Order: Gentianales
- Family: Apocynaceae
- Genus: Hoodia
- Species: H. juttae

Binomial name
- Hoodia juttae Dinter

Synonyms
- Ceropegia juttae (Dinter) Bruyns

= Hoodia juttae =

Species of plant

Hoodia juttae is a species of plant in the family Apocynaceae. It is endemic to Namibia. Its natural habitats are rocky areas and cold desert. H. juttae is found around the Little and Great Karas mountains. It is threatened by collection. The plant was discovered by Jutta Dinter, the wife of botanist, Kurt Dinter in 1913. The scientific name refers to Jutta.

== Description ==
Hoodia juttae is small and branches freely into a small "shrublet." The plant is often more broad than it grows tall, rarely being taller than 0.3 meters in height. Flowers are medium-sized and yellow-brown in color and grow in groups on the upper part of the pale gray-green stems.

== Cultivation ==
Hoodia juttae is best grown in mineral, acidic substrates. The plant is best grown from seed or grafting of cuttings. The plant can be hand-pollinated to generate seeds.
