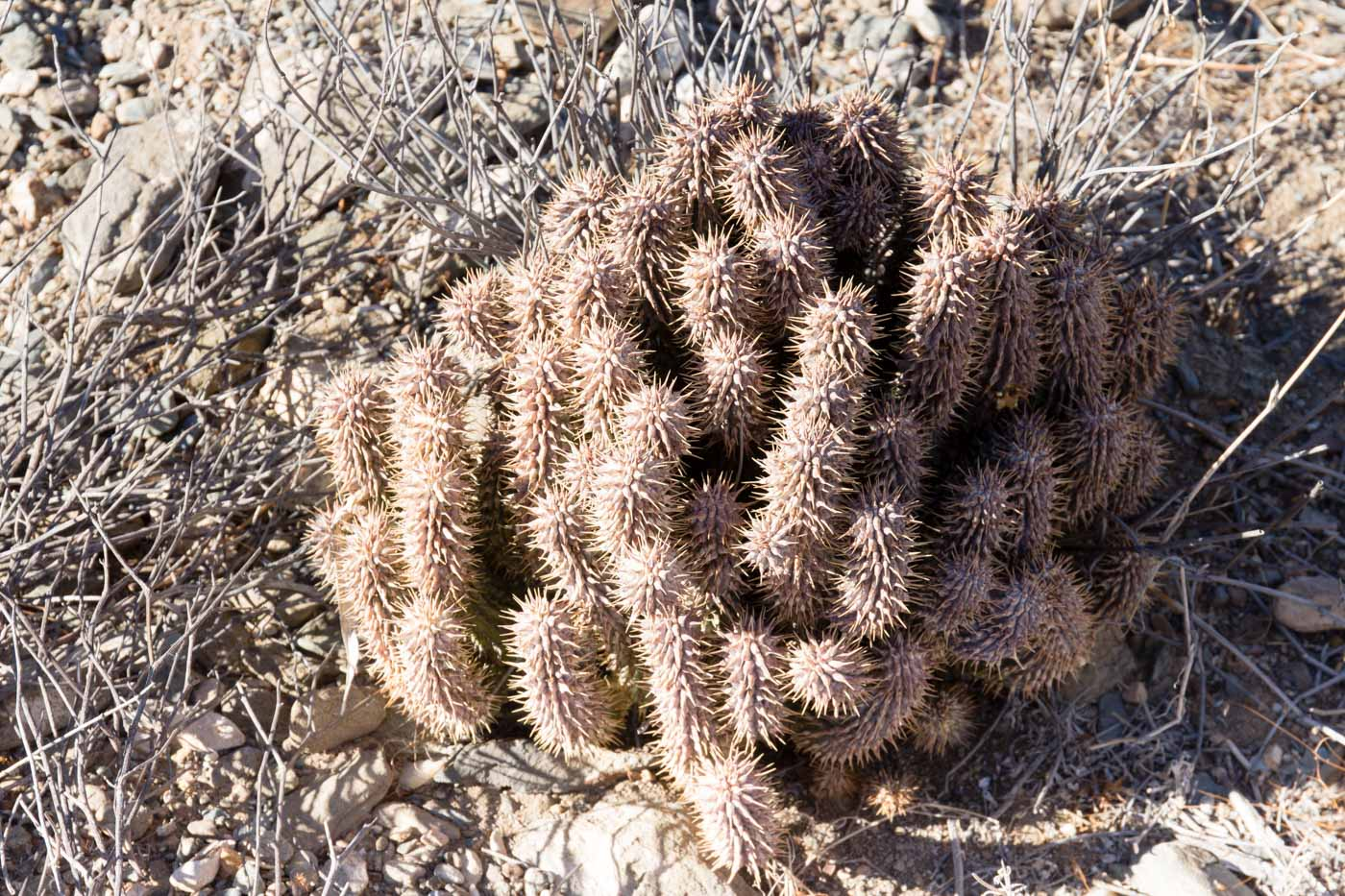

Scientific classification
- Kingdom: Plantae
- Clade: Tracheophytes
- Clade: Angiosperms
- Clade: Eudicots
- Clade: Asterids
- Order: Gentianales
- Family: Apocynaceae
- Genus: Hoodia
- Species: H. alstonii

Binomial name
- Hoodia alstonii (N.E.Br.) Plowes

= Hoodia alstonii =

Species of succulent

Hoodia alstonii is a succulent plant native to Namibia and the Cape Province of South Africa. H. alstonii is also known commonly as ghaap, an Afrikaans name. It tends to grow in rocky, desert areas.

== Description ==
Hoodia alstonii can grow to about 1 metre (3.3 ft) in height. The stems are upright and pale gray in color. The plant has very sharp, hard spines. It produces small, yellow flowers mostly on the top parts of the stems which are approximately 1–1.8 centimetres (0.4–0.7 in) in diameter. The flowers have an odor similar to excrement and are pollinated by flies. It has a shallow root system.

== Cultivation ==
Hoodia alstonii is considered easy to grow, but needs plenty of fresh air and should be watered mainly during its growing season. It is prone to root rot. It prefers warm temperatures, though it is occasionally hardy to 0 °C (32 °F).

== Uses ==
Hoodia alstonii has been harvested in the wild as a food source.
