= Council for Scientific and Industrial Research =

South African scientific research and development organisation

Coordinates: 25°45′13″S 28°16′31″E

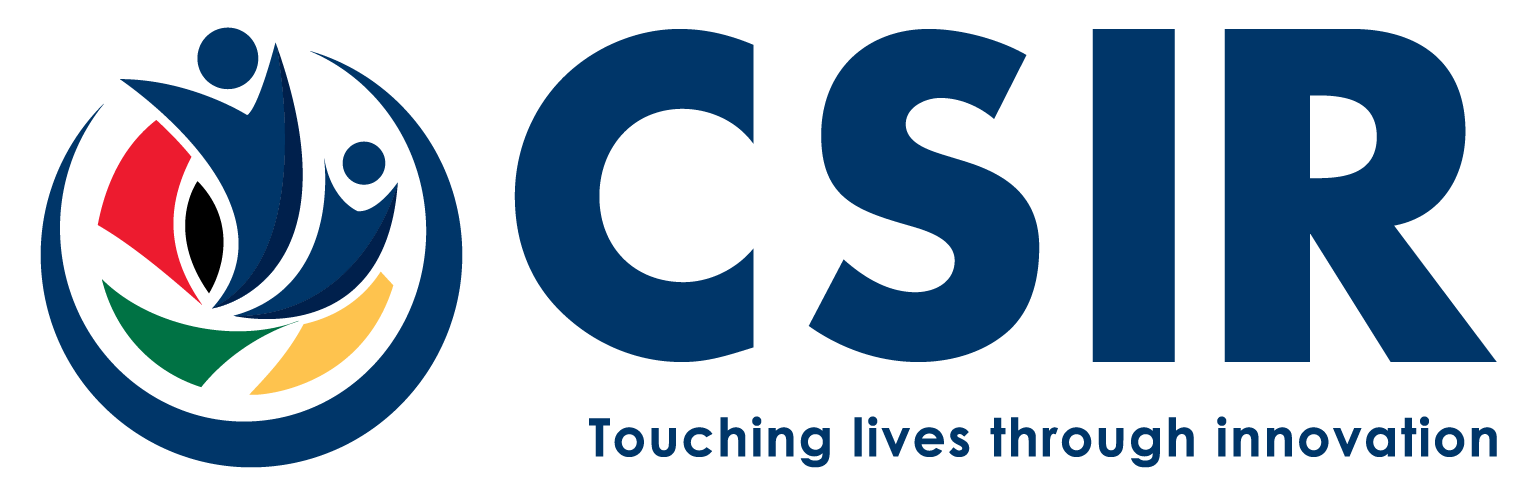
- Abbreviation: CSIR
- Formation: 1945; 81 years ago
- Type: Research and development organisation
- Location: Pretoria, South Africa
- Region served: South Africa
- President and CEO: Thulani Dlamini
- Website: csir.co.za

The Council for Scientific and Industrial Research (CSIR) is a South African scientific research and development (R&D) organisation. It was established by an act of parliament in 1945 and is situated on its campus in Pretoria.

It is Africa's largest research and development organisation and accounts for about 10% of the entire African R&D budget. It has a staff of approximately 3,000 technical and scientific researchers.

== Overview ==
The Council for Scientific and Industrial Research (CSIR) is a leading scientific and technology research organisation that researches and develops transformative technologies to accelerate socioeconomic prosperity in South Africa. The organisation’s work contributes to industrial development and supports a capable state. The CSIR is an entity of the Department of Science and Innovation.

The organisation plays a key role in supporting the public and private sectors through directed research that is aligned with the country’s priorities, the organisation’s mandate and its science, engineering and technology competences. The nine high-impact sectors identified by the CSIR to achieve its aims are:

Industry advancement clusters

- Advanced Agriculture and Food
- NextGen Health
- Future Production: Chemicals
- Future Production: Mining
- Future Production: Manufacturing
- Defence and Security

Industry and society enabling clusters

- Smart Places
- Smart Mobility
- NextGen Enterprises and Institutions

=== Presidents and chief executive officers ===
Role	Name	Period	Notes
President	Basil Schonland	1945–1950	Founding president
President	Petrus Johann du Toit	1950–1952	
President	Stefan Meiring Naude	1952–1971	
President	Christiaan van der Merwe Brink	1971–1980	
President	Christoph Friedrich Garbers	1980–1990	
President	James Brian Clark	1990–1995	
President	Geoff Garrett	1995–2000	
President	Sibusiso Sibisi	2002–2008	
CEO	Sibusiso Sibisi	2008–2017	
CEO	Thulani Dlamini	2017–present	

== SERA ==
In 1999, a strategic alliance, the Southern Education and Research Alliance (SERA), was formed between the University of Pretoria and the CSIR. SERA collaborates locally and internationally with universities, NGOs, companies, and multinational bodies in various research areas.

== Aircraft ==
- CSIR Sara II

== Controversy ==
=== Allegations of political interference ===
In July 2016, the amaBhungane Centre for Investigative Journalism published an article that alleges that South Africa's Science and Technology Minister Naledi Pandor and Director-General Phil Mjwara were attempting to put undue pressure on the CSIR, at the behest of the African National Congress (ANC) treasurer-general Zweli Mkhize, to favour the Chinese multinational Huawei Technologies in the purchase of a new 116 million South African rand (US$8 million) supercomputer for the institute. This followed the publication of the council's long-time CEO, Sibusiso Sibisi's, open letter of resignation stating that irregularities and political pressure on the awarding of contracts to suppliers were of great concern.

=== Biopiracy case ===
In a case of biopiracy, bioprospectors from CSIR became interested in the Hoodia plant as an appetite suppressant for weight loss after a marketing campaign falsely claimed its efficacy. They patented it without recognising the San people's traditional claims to knowledge of the plant and its uses. The patent was later sold to Unilever, which marketed Hoodia products as diet supplements. In 2003, the South African San Council made an agreement with CSIR in which they would receive from 6 to 8% of the sales revenue of Hoodia gordonii products, money that would be deposited in a fund to purchase land for the San people who had been dispossessed of their lands by migrating tribes.
