= Simon van der Stel Foundation =

First heritage association in South Africa

The Simon van der Stel foundation (today known as the Heritage Association of South Africa) was the first heritage association in South Africa. Founded in 8th of April 1959 by Dr Willem H.J Punt, with branches all over the country, this National Body endeavored to protect buildings with historical significance in South Africa.

== Purpose ==
The Simon van der Stel foundation launched initiatives intended to prompt the protection, conservation and restoration of buildings with historical, architectural and cultural value. The foundation offered advice about restoration and make efforts to assist the public in becoming aware of their cultural heritage. This non-profit company adopted the name Simon van der Stel because a particular type of architecture (Cape-Dutch) was under threat from development.

== Blue Plaques ==
Blue Plaques are part of an international movement to create links between people and buildings. Heritage Associations assist individuals and communities to erect a Blue plaque and identify, recognise and commemorate the person or place. Herbert Prins brought the Blue Plaques concept to South Africa, and did not "patent, copyright or brand" this Blue Plaque initiative

== Restored buildings ==
- Coornhoop was bought in 1961 by the Simon van der Stel Foundation and restored in 1964.
- Boekenhoutfontein was restored by the Simon van der Stel Foundation in 1971
