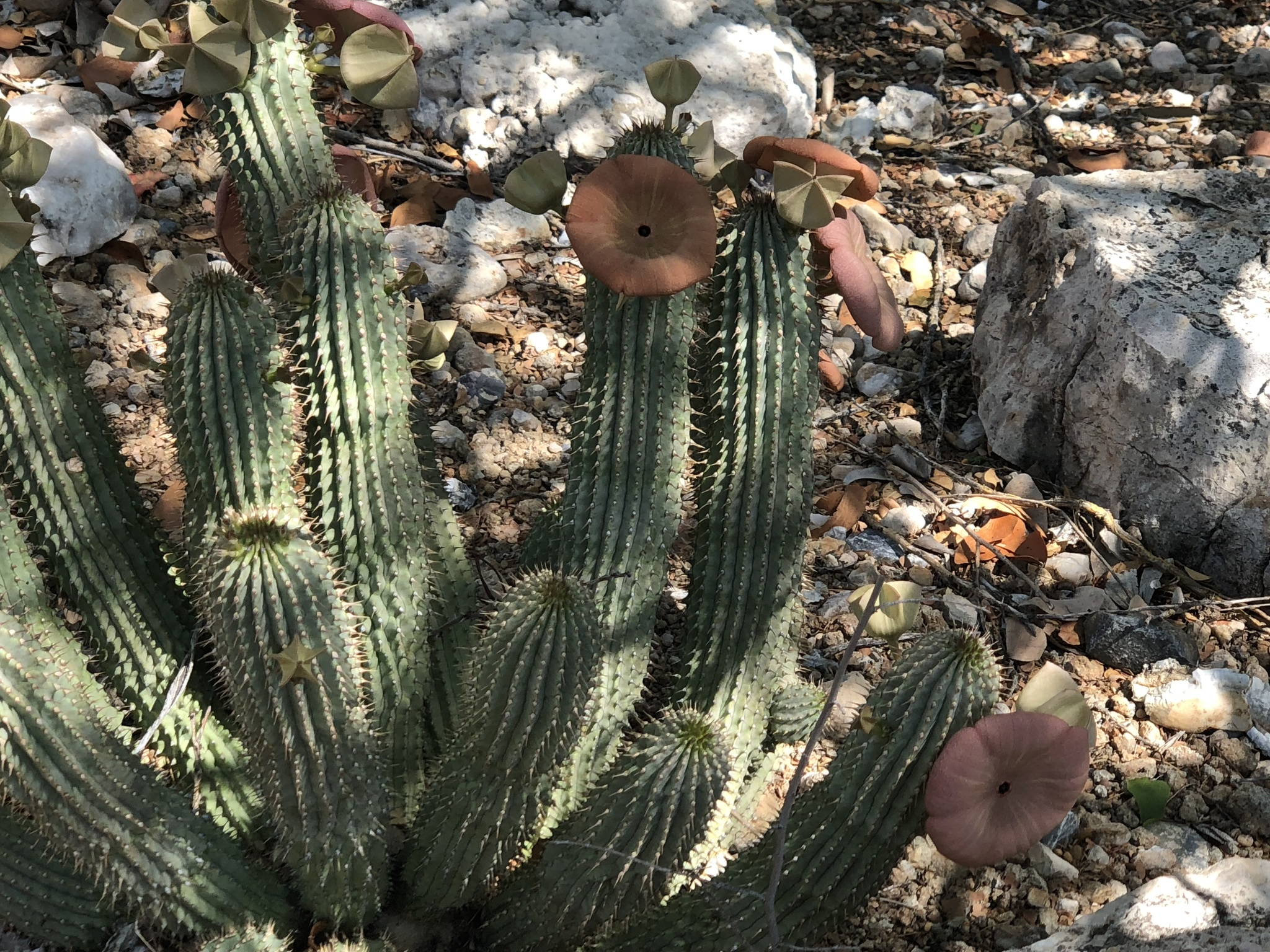

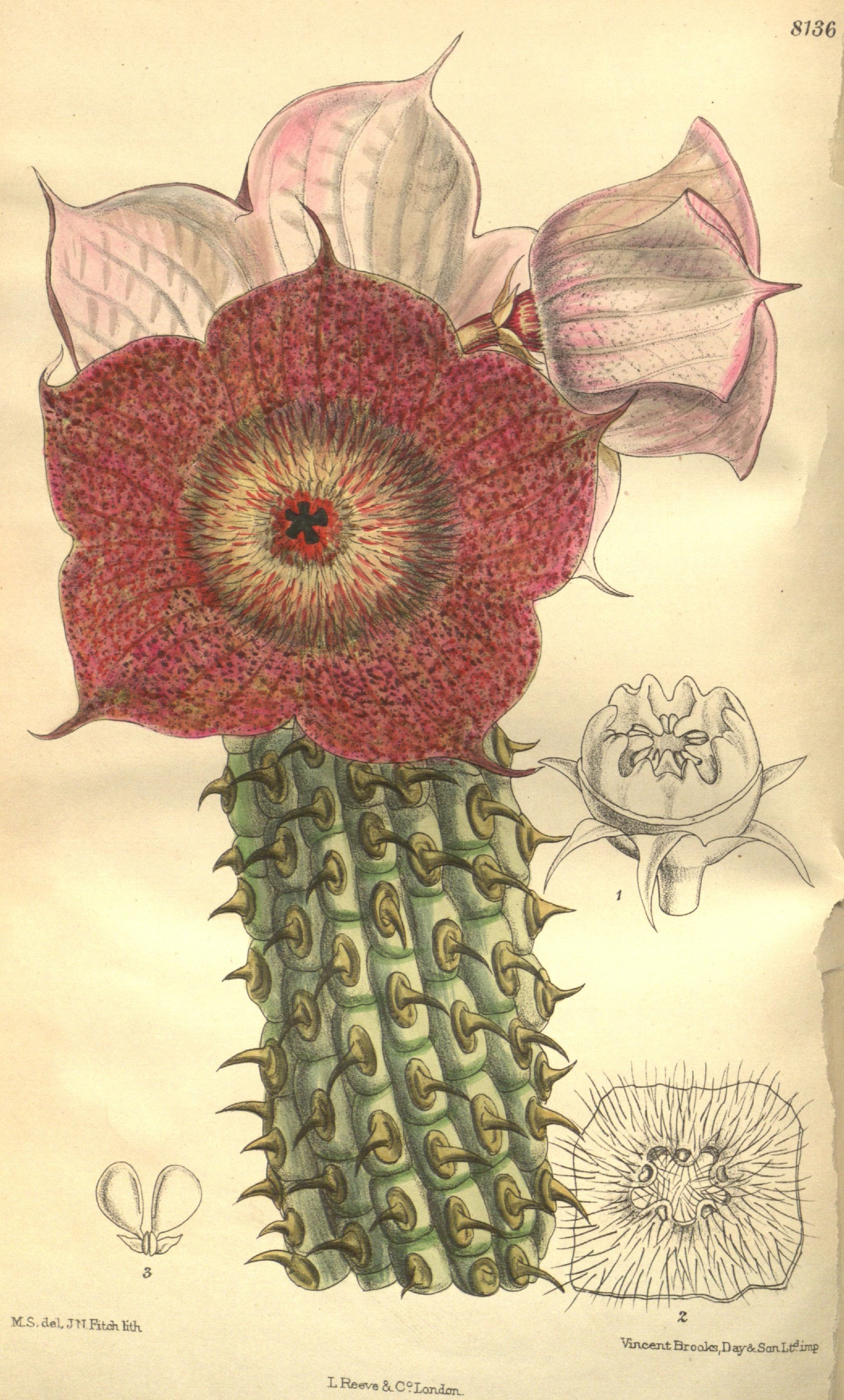

Scientific classification
- Kingdom: Plantae
- Clade: Tracheophytes
- Clade: Angiosperms
- Clade: Eudicots
- Clade: Asterids
- Order: Gentianales
- Family: Apocynaceae
- Genus: Hoodia
- Species: H. currorii

Binomial name
- Hoodia currorii (Hook.) Decne.

= Hoodia currorii =

Species of plant

Hoodia currorii is a succulent plant native to Namibia and the Cape Province of South Africa. It grows in desert areas and is common along the road from Karibib to Swakopmund in Namibia. It is also known as ghaap in the vernacular.

== Description ==
Hoodia currorii grows in erect clumps with gray-green stems, 8 centimeters in diameter. It reaches heights of 50 to 80 centimeters tall. It bears rust-red flowers mid-summer which are covered in purple hairs. These are large flowers, about five to ten centimeters in diameter.

== Cultivation ==
Hoodia currorii is more commonly seen cultivated than other Hoodia species. It can be grown from cuttings.

== Uses ==
Hoodia currorii may be eaten after the spines are removed and is said to have a sweet flavor.
