= National Physical Laboratory =

National Physical Laboratory can refer to:

- National Physical Laboratory of India
- National Physical Laboratory (Israel)
- National Physical Laboratory (United Kingdom)
