= IXICO =

UK biotech company

- Type: Public limited company
- Traded as: LSE:IXI
- Industry: Data analytics for clinical research
- Founded: 2004
- Founders: Professors Derek Hill, Daniel Rueckert, David Hawkes and Jo Hajnal
- Headquarters: London, United Kingdom
- Area served: Worldwide
- Key people: Mark Warne (Chairman); Bram Goorden(CEO)
- Website: https://ixico.com/

IXICO plc is a UK-based neuroscience imaging and biomarker analytics company focused on neurological disease research. The company provides clinical trial imaging, image data management, and biomarker analytics to biopharmaceutical firms and research organisations working in neurological disorders such as Alzheimer's disease, Huntington's disease, Parkinson's disease, multiple sclerosis, and other neurological conditions.

== Company history ==
IXICO was incorporated in 2004 as a spin-out from Imperial College London, University College London and King's College London. The company name comes from “Information eXtraction from Images,” the title of an early research project that helped establish the IXI platform.

In October 2013, IXICO entered the Alternative Investment Market (AIM) of the London Stock Exchange through a reverse takeover of defunct pharmaceutical drug company Phytopharm.

== Phytopharm ==
Phytopharm was a British pharmaceutical company, incorporated on 28 November 1995. Briefly known as Lawnhale, it changed its name to Phytopharm in March 1996 and listed on the London Stock Exchange on 25 April of the same year (LSE:PYM). It announced plans for a secondary listing on NASDAQ in 2004 (NASDAQ:PHYOF). By 2012, the Phytopharm group consisted of a parent company, Phytopharm plc, a wholly owned trading subsidiary, Phytotech Limited, and a dormant subsidiary, Phytodevelopments Limited.

Amongst other activity, Phytopharm raised funds for research into treatment of Parkinson's disease (PD) from sources including the Michael J Fox Foundation, but the company collapsed in 2013 following the failure of its main PD drug (Cogane) during clinical trials. Its shares were suspended from trading on 20 May 2013.

== IXI Platform ==
IXICO’s IXI platform is its proprietary AI-enabled neuroimaging technology platform for precision medicine and neurological disease research. Designed by neuroscientists for neuroscientists it is able to process imaging data from global trials and support clinical trial imaging and biomarker science insights.

The IXI platform uses machine learning and deep learning to process data from global trials and measure imaging biomarkers associated with the identification, progression, and treatment of diseases such as Alzheimer's disease, Huntington's disease, and Parkinson's disease. It combines image data capture, image reading, analysis, and regulatorily compliant reporting in a single end-to-end workflow.

IXICO provides end-to-end imaging services for neurological clinical trials, including trial management, image data management, biomarker analysis, and consulting support. Its work focuses on neurological disease research, including Alzheimer’s disease, Huntington’s disease, Parkinson’s disease, multiple sclerosis, other demyelinating disorders, other Parkinsonian disorders, and rare neurological diseases.
