= P57 (glycoside) =

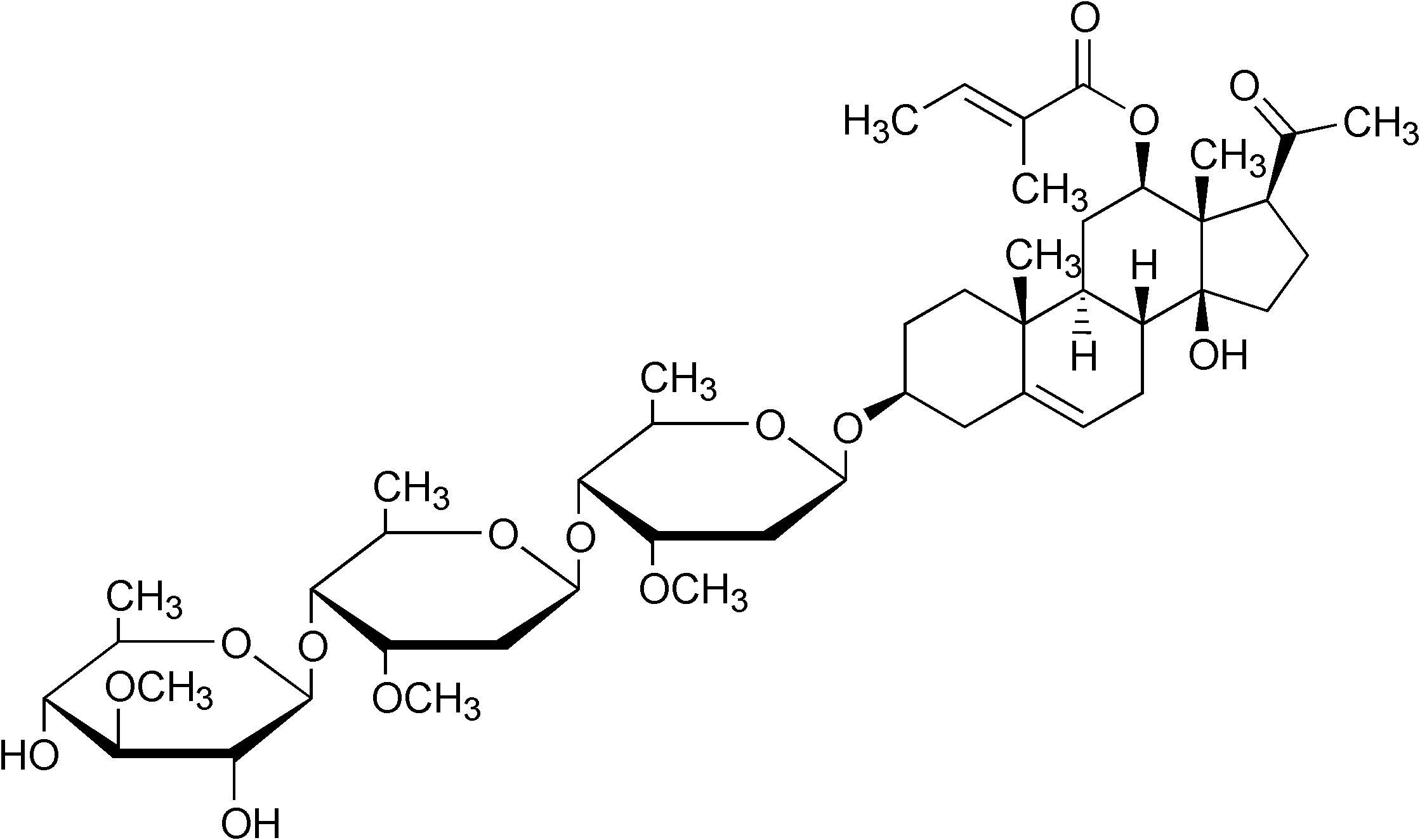

Names
- IUPAC name 14-Hydroxy-3β-[(3-O-methyl-β-D-quinovopyranosyl)-(1→4)-(3-O-methyl-2-deoxy-β-D-ribo-hexopyranosyl)-(1→4)-3-O-methyl-2-deoxy-β-D-ribo-hexopyranosyloxy]-20-oxo-14β-pregn-5-en-12β-yl (2E)-2-methylbut-2-enoate
- Systematic IUPAC name (1^{1}S,1^{3a}S,1^{3b}R,1^{7}S,1^{9a}R,1^{9b}S,1^{11}R,1^{11a}S,3^{2}R,3^{4}S,3^{5}R,3^{6}R,5^{2}S,5^{4}S,5^{5}R,5^{6}R,7^{2}S,7^{3}R,7^{4}S,7^{5}R,7^{6}R)-1^{1}-Acetyl-1^{3a},7^{3},7^{5}-trihydroxy-3^{4},5^{4},7^{4}-trimethoxy-1^{9a},1^{11a},3^{6},5^{6},7^{6}-pentamethyl-1^{2},1^{3},1^{3a},1^{4b},1^{4},1^{6},1^{7},1^{8},1^{9},1^{9a},1^{9b},1^{10},1^{11},1^{11a}-tetradecahydro-1^{1}H-2,4,6-trioxa-3,5(2,5),7(2)-tris(oxana)-1(7)-cyclopenta[a]phenanthrenaheptaphan-1^{11}-yl (2E)-2-methylbut-2-enoate
- Other names P57; P57AS3

Identifiers
CAS Number	384329-61-7
3D model (JSmol)	Interactive image
ChemSpider	8138385
PubChem CID	9962786
UNII	870A6Q6XVJ
CompTox Dashboard (EPA)	DTXSID20433336
- InChI: InChI=1S/C47H74O15/c1-12-23(2)43(51)60-35-20-32-31(47(52)18-16-30(24(3)48)46(35,47)8)14-13-28-19-29(15-17-45(28,32)7)59-36-21-33(53-9)40(26(5)56-36)61-37-22-34(54-10)41(27(6)57-37)62-44-39(50)42(55-11)38(49)25(4)58-44/h12-13,25-27,29-42,44,49-50,52H,14-22H2,1-11H3/b23-12+/t25-,26-,27-,29+,30-,31-,32+,33+,34+,35-,36+,37+,38-,39-,40-,41-,42+,44+,45+,46+,47+/m1/s1 Key: CBMQKMMZBOSHHP-VXXSQTRDSA-N; InChI=1/C47H74O15/c1-12-23(2)43(51)60-35-20-32-31(47(52)18-16-30(24(3)48)46(35,47)8)14-13-28-19-29(15-17-45(28,32)7)59-36-21-33(53-9)40(26(5)56-36)61-37-22-34(54-10)41(27(6)57-37)62-44-39(50)42(55-11)38(49)25(4)58-44/h12-13,25-27,29-42,44,49-50,52H,14-22H2,1-11H3/b23-12+/t25-,26-,27-,29+,30-,31-,32+,33+,34+,35-,36+,37+,38-,39-,40-,41-,42+,44+,45+,46+,47+/m1/s1 Key: CBMQKMMZBOSHHP-VXXSQTRDBA
- SMILES: O=C(C)[C@H]1CC[C@@]7(O)[C@]1(C)[C@H](OC(=O)/C(=C/C)C)C[C@H]6[C@H]7C/C=C5/C[C@@H](O[C@@H]4O[C@H](C)[C@@H](O[C@@H]3O[C@@H]([C@@H](O[C@@H]2O[C@@H]([C@@H](O)[C@H](OC)[C@H]2O)C)[C@@H](OC)C3)C)[C@@H](OC)C4)CC[C@@]56C

Properties
Chemical formula	C_{47}H_{74}O_{15}
Molar mass	879.094 g·mol^{−1}
- Except where otherwise noted, data are given for materials in their standard state (at 25 °C [77 °F], 100 kPa). verify (what is ?) Infobox references

P57 is an oxypregnane steroidal glycoside isolated from the traditional African medicine Hoodia gordonii. P57 is hypothesized to be the chemical constituent responsible for the putative appetite suppressant activity of Hoodia.

In a study on rats at Brown Medical School, intracerebroventricular injections of the purified P57 demonstrated that the compound has a likely central nervous system (CNS) mechanism of action like that of neuroactive steroids. The studies demonstrated that the compound increases the content of ATP by 50-150% in hypothalamic neurons. In addition, third ventricle administration of P57 reduced subsequent 24-hour food intake by 40-60%.

== See also ==
- Anorectic, for additional information about appetite suppressants
- Neuroactive steroid
