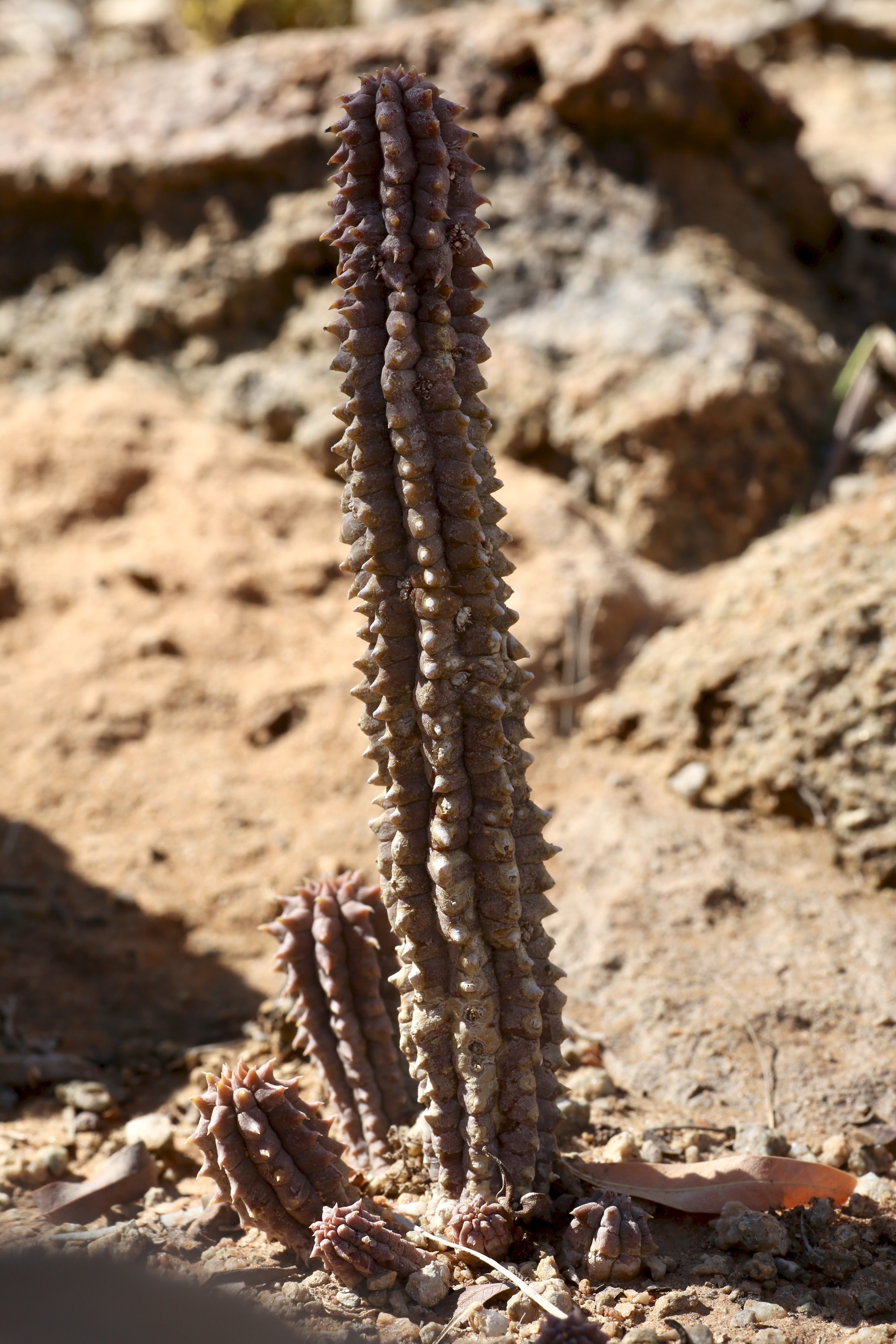

Scientific classification
- Kingdom: Plantae
- Clade: Tracheophytes
- Clade: Angiosperms
- Clade: Eudicots
- Clade: Asterids
- Order: Gentianales
- Family: Apocynaceae
- Subfamily: Asclepiadoideae
- Tribe: Ceropegieae
- Genus: Richtersveldia; Meve & Liede (2002)
- Species: R. columnaris

Binomial name
- Richtersveldia columnaris (Nel) Meve & Liede (2002)

Synonyms
- Ceropegia columnaris (Nel) Bruyns (2017); Echidnopsis columnaris (Nel) R.A.Dyer & Hardy (1968); Notechidnopsis columnaris (Nel) Lavranos & Bleck (1985); Trichocaulon columnare Nel (1933)

= Richtersveldia columnaris =

Species of plant

Richtersveldia columnaris is a species of flowering plant in the family Apocynaceae. It is a succulent subshrub endemic to the Northern Cape Province of South Africa. It is the sole species in genus Richtersveldia.
