= List of Ceropegia species =

The following species in the flowering plant genus Ceropegia are accepted by Plants of the World Online. In 2017, molecular and morphological evidence showed that many members of the subtribe Stapeliinae, including the entirety of the large genus Brachystelma, are nested inside Ceropegia.

== A ==
- Ceropegia abyssinica Decne.
- Ceropegia achtenii De Wild.
- Ceropegia acicularis Kidyoo
- Ceropegia adamsiana M.G.Gilbert
- Ceropegia affinis Vatke
- Ceropegia afra (Schltr.) Bruyns
- Ceropegia africana R.Br.
- Ceropegia ahmarensis Masinde
- Ceropegia albipilosa (A.Lancaster ex Peckover) Bruyns
- Ceropegia albisepta Jum. & H.Perrier
- Ceropegia aloicola M.G.Gilbert
- Ceropegia alpina (R.A.Dyer) Bruyns
- Ceropegia ambovombensis Rauh & Gerold
- Ceropegia ampliata E.Mey.
- Ceropegia ananthagiriensis (Paramesh, K.Prasad, Sadas. & A.V.B.Reddy) Anant Kumar
- Ceropegia ananthapuramense (K.Prasad, A.Naray. & Meve) Kottaim.
- Ceropegia anantii S.R.Yadav, Sardesai & S.P.Gaikwad
- Ceropegia andamanica Sreek., Veenakumari & Prashanth
- Ceropegia angustata Bruyns
- Ceropegia angustifolia Wight
- Ceropegia anjanerica Malpure, M.Y.Kamble & S.R.Yadav
- Ceropegia annamacharyae (K.Prasad, Prasanna, Meve, Sankara Rao & Thulasaiah) Kottaim.
- Ceropegia ansariana Murug. & A.A.Mao
- Ceropegia antennifera Schltr.
- Ceropegia aquamontana Peckover
- Ceropegia arabica H.Huber
- Ceropegia arenaria R.A.Dyer
- Ceropegia arenarioides M.G.Gilbert
- Ceropegia aridicola W.W.Sm.
- Ceropegia aristolochioides Decne.
- Ceropegia ariyittaparensis P.Biju, Josekutty & Augustine
- Ceropegia armandii Rauh
- Ceropegia arnotii (Baker) Bruyns
- Ceropegia arnottiana Wight
- Ceropegia attenuata Hook.
- Ceropegia attenuatula Bruyns
- Ceropegia australis (R.A.Dyer) Bruyns

== B ==
- Ceropegia ballyana Bullock
- Ceropegia banforae (J.-P.Lebrun & Stork) Bruyns
- Ceropegia barbata R.A.Dyer
- Ceropegia barberae (Harv. ex Hook.f.) Bruyns
- Ceropegia barnesii E.A.Bruce & Chatterjee
- Ceropegia beddomei Hook.f.
- Ceropegia bhatii S.R.Yadav & Shendage
- Ceropegia bhutanica H.Hara
- Ceropegia bikitaensis (Peckover) Bruyns
- Ceropegia blepharanthera (Hans Huber) Bruyns
- Ceropegia boerhaaviifolia Deflers
- Ceropegia bonafouxii K.Schum.
- Ceropegia boonjarasii Kidyoo
- Ceropegia bosseri Rauh & Buchloh
- Ceropegia bourneae (Gamble) Bruyns
- Ceropegia bowkeri Harv.
- Ceropegia brachyceras Schltr.
- Ceropegia bracteolata (Meve) Bruyns
- Ceropegia breviflora (Schltr.) Bruyns
- Ceropegia brevipedicellata (Turrill) Bruyns
- Ceropegia brevitubulata Bedd.
- Ceropegia browniana (S.Moore) Bruyns
- Ceropegia bruceae (R.A.Dyer) Bruyns
- Ceropegia buchananii (N.E.Br.) Bruyns
- Ceropegia bulbosa Roxb.
- Ceropegia buraoensis Bruyns
- Ceropegia burchelliana Bruyns

== C ==
- Ceropegia calcicola Kidyoo
- Ceropegia campanulata G.Don
- Ceropegia campanuliformis Bruyns
- Ceropegia cana (R.A.Dyer) Bruyns
- Ceropegia cancellata Rchb.
- Ceropegia candelabrum L.
- Ceropegia capensis Bruyns
- Ceropegia carnosa E.Mey.
- Ceropegia cataphyllaris Bullock
- Ceropegia cathcartensis (R.A.Dyer) Bruyns
- Ceropegia chimanimaniensis M.G.Gilbert
- Ceropegia chlorantha (Schltr.) Bruyns
- Ceropegia chlorozona (E.A.Bruce) Bruyns
- Ceropegia christenseniana Hand.-Mazz.
- Ceropegia christianeae (Peckover) Bruyns
- Ceropegia chuakulii Kidyoo
- Ceropegia ciliata Wight
- Ceropegia ciliatior Bruyns
- Ceropegia cimiciodora Oberm.
- Ceropegia circinata (E.Mey.) Bruyns
- Ceropegia citrina Kidyoo & A.Kidyoo
- Ceropegia claviloba Werderm.
- Ceropegia cochleata Kidyoo
- Ceropegia coddii (R.A.Dyer) Bruyns
- Ceropegia codonantha (Bruyns) Bruyns
- Ceropegia collaricorona Werderm.
- Ceropegia concanensis Kambale, Chandore & S.R.Yadav
- Ceropegia conrathii Schltr.
- Ceropegia convolvuloides A.Rich.
- Ceropegia copleyae E.A.Bruce & P.R.O.Bally
- Ceropegia cordata Lour.
- Ceropegia cordifolia M.G.Gilbert
- Ceropegia cordiloba Werderm.
- Ceropegia crinita Peckover
- Ceropegia cryptobarbata Heiduk
- Ceropegia cufodontii Chiov.
- Ceropegia cumingiana Decne.
- Ceropegia cummingii (A.P.Dold) Bruyns
- Ceropegia cupulata (R.A.Dyer) Bruyns
- Ceropegia cycniflora R.A.Dyer
- Ceropegia cyperifolia Bruyns

== D ==
- Ceropegia damannii Stopp
- Ceropegia daverichardsii Bruyns
- Ceropegia debilis N.E.Br.
- Ceropegia decaisneana Wight
- Ceropegia decidua E.A.Bruce
- Ceropegia decipientiflora Bruyns
- Ceropegia deightonii Hutch. & Dalziel
- Ceropegia delicata (R.A.Dyer) Bruyns
- Ceropegia denticulata K.Schum.
- Ceropegia dichotoma Haw.
- Ceropegia differens Bruyns
- Ceropegia digitiformis Kidyoo
- Ceropegia dimorpha Humbert
- Ceropegia dinteri Schltr.
- Ceropegia discoidea (R.A.Dyer) Bruyns
- Ceropegia distincta N.E.Br.
- Ceropegia dolichophylla Schltr.
- Ceropegia dorjei C.E.C.Fisch.
- Ceropegia dryophila C.K.Schneid.
- Ceropegia duplicata (R.A.Dyer) Bruyns
- Ceropegia dyeri (K.Balkwill, M.Balkwill & Cadman) Bruyns

== E ==
- Ceropegia edulissima Bruyns
- Ceropegia elegans Wall.
- Ceropegia elegantior Bruyns
- Ceropegia elegantula (S.Moore) Bruyns
- Ceropegia elenaduensis (Sathyan.) Bruyns
- Ceropegia ellenbeckii K.Schum.
- Ceropegia elliptica (A.Rich.) Bruyns
- Ceropegia elongata (Schltr.) Bruyns
- Ceropegia emdenpienaarii Bruyns
- Ceropegia ensifolia Bedd.
- Ceropegia eshanensis X.D.Ma & J.Y.Shen
- Ceropegia evansii McCann
- Ceropegia exigua (H.Huber) M.G.Gilbert & P.T.Li
- Ceropegia exilis (Bullock) Bruyns

== F ==
- Ceropegia fantastica Sedgw.
- Ceropegia festucifolia (E.A.Bruce) Bruyns
- Ceropegia filicorona Masinde
- Ceropegia filifolia (Schltr.) Bruyns
- Ceropegia filiformis (Burch.) Schltr.
- Ceropegia filipendula K.Schum.
- Ceropegia fimbriata E.Mey.
- Ceropegia fimbriifera Bedd.
- Ceropegia flavida (Schltr.) M.G.Gilbert
- Ceropegia floribunda N.E.Br.
- Ceropegia floribundior Bruyns
- Ceropegia foetidiflora Kidyoo
- Ceropegia foliosa Bruyns
- Ceropegia fortuita R.A.Dyer
- Ceropegia franksiae (N.E.Br.) Bruyns
- Ceropegia furcata Werderm.
- Ceropegia fusca Bolle
- Ceropegia fusiformis N.E.Br.

== G ==
- Ceropegia galeata H.Huber
- Ceropegia gardneri Thwaites
- Ceropegia gemmea (R.A.Dyer) Bruyns
- Ceropegia gerrardii (Harv.) Bruyns
- Ceropegia gikyi Rauh & Gerold
- Ceropegia gilboaensis Heiduk, N.R.Crouch & D.Styles
- Ceropegia gilgiana Werderm.
- Ceropegia glabra (Hook.f.) Bruyns
- Ceropegia glabriflora (F.Muell.) Bruyns
- Ceropegia glenensis (R.A.Dyer) Bruyns
- Ceropegia gondwanensis (Govekar, Kahalkar & Sardesai) Kottaim.
- Ceropegia gracilidens Bruyns
- Ceropegia gracilior Bruyns
- Ceropegia gracillima (R.A.Dyer) Bruyns
- Ceropegia graminea K.Suwann. & Kidyoo
- Ceropegia gypsophila Thulin

== H ==
- Ceropegia haygarthii Schltr.
- Ceropegia heidukiae D.Styles & Meve
- Ceropegia hermannii Rauh & Teissier
- Ceropegia hirsuta Wight & Arn.
- Ceropegia hirtella (Weim.) Bruyns
- Ceropegia hofstaetteri Rauh
- Ceropegia hookeri C.B.Clarke ex Hook.f.
- Ceropegia huberi Ansari
- Ceropegia humbertii H.Huber
- Ceropegia huttonii (Harv.) Bruyns

== I ==
- Ceropegia illegitima H.Huber
- Ceropegia imbricata E.A.Bruce & P.R.O.Bally
- Ceropegia incana (R.A.Dyer) Bruyns
- Ceropegia inconspicuior Bruyns
- Ceropegia inflata Hochst. ex Werderm.
- Ceropegia inornata P.R.O.Bally ex Masinde
- Ceropegia insignis R.A.Dyer
- Ceropegia intermedia Wight

== J ==
- Ceropegia jainii Ansari & B.G.P.Kulk.
- Ceropegia jilongensis X.D.Ma & J.Y.Shen
- Ceropegia jinshaensis D.T.Liu & Z.K.Wu
- Ceropegia johnsonii N.E.Br.
- Ceropegia johnstonii (N.E.Br.) Bruyns
- Ceropegia juncea Roxb.

== K ==
- Ceropegia kaariyei Thulin
- Ceropegia kachinensis Prain
- Ceropegia keniensis Masinde
- Ceropegia kenyana Bruyns
- Ceropegia kerrii (Craib) Bruyns
- Ceropegia kerzneri (Peckover) Bruyns
- Ceropegia khasiana Murug., A.A.Mao, Meitei & Kambale
- Ceropegia kituloana Bruyns
- Ceropegia kituloensis Masinde & F.Albers
- Ceropegia kolarensis (Arekal & T.M.Ramakrishna) Bruyns
- Ceropegia konasita Masinde
- Ceropegia kumaonensis Kamal Kishor, G.S.Rawat & Samant
- Ceropegia kundelunguensis Malaisse

== L ==
- Ceropegia laevigata (Wight) Bruyns
- Ceropegia laikipiensis Masinde
- Ceropegia lancasteri (Boele) Bruyns
- Ceropegia langkawiensis Rintz
- Ceropegia lankana (Dassan. & Jayas.) Bruyns
- Ceropegia laotica Rodda & Meve
- Ceropegia lawii Hook.f.
- Ceropegia ledermannii Schltr.
- Ceropegia leptophylla Bruyns
- Ceropegia leptotes M.G.Gilbert
- Ceropegia leroyi Rauh & Marn.-Lap.
- Ceropegia letestui (Pellegr.) Bruyns
- Ceropegia lindenii Lavranos
- Ceropegia linearis E.Mey.
- Ceropegia linophyllum H.Huber
- Ceropegia longicaudata Phonep. & Rodda
- Ceropegia longifolia Wall.
- Ceropegia longifoliata Bruyns
- Ceropegia longirostris Thulin, M.G.Gilbert & Kaariye
- Ceropegia loranthiflora K.Schum.
- Ceropegia loureiroi G.Don
- Ceropegia lubangoensis Bruyns
- Ceropegia lucida Wall.
- Ceropegia ludlowii H.Huber
- Ceropegia lugardiae N.E.Br.
- Ceropegia luteiflora Bruyns
- Ceropegia luzhiensis X.D.Ma & J.Y.Shen

== M ==
- Ceropegia maccannii Ansari
- Ceropegia macmasteri A.P.Dold
- Ceropegia macrantha Wight
- Ceropegia macropetala (Schltr.) Bruyns
- Ceropegia maculata Bedd.
- Ceropegia madagascariensis Decne.
- Ceropegia madens Werderm.
- Ceropegia mafekingensis (N.E.Br.) R.A.Dyer
- Ceropegia mahabalei Hemadri & Ansari
- Ceropegia mahajanii (Kambale & S.R.Yadav) Bruyns
- Ceropegia mahendragiriensis (K.Prasad, Chorghe & Venu) Kottaim.
- Ceropegia mairei (H.Lév.) H.Huber
- Ceropegia maiuscula H.Huber
- Ceropegia malawiensis (Peckover) M.G.Gilbert
- Ceropegia malwanensis (S.R.Yadav & N.P.Singh) Bruyns
- Ceropegia manderensis Masinde
- Ceropegia mannarana P.Umam. & P.Daniel
- Ceropegia manoharii Sujanapal, P.M.Salim, Anil Kumar & Sasidh.
- Ceropegia maritae (Peckover) Bruyns
- Ceropegia marronina Bruyns & Hanácek
- Ceropegia matthewiana (Bruyns & Britto) Bruyns
- Ceropegia mayottae H.Huber
- Ceropegia media (H.Huber) Ansari
- Ceropegia megamalayana (Karupp.) Kottaim.
- Ceropegia megasepala (Peckover) Bruyns
- Ceropegia meleagris H.Huber
- Ceropegia mendesii Stopp
- Ceropegia merrilliana Bruyns
- Ceropegia metziana Miq.
- Ceropegia meyeri Decne.
- Ceropegia meyeriana (Schltr.) Bruyns
- Ceropegia meyeri-johannis Engl.
- Ceropegia micriflora Bruyns
- Ceropegia microgaster M.G.Gilbert
- Ceropegia minima (R.A.Dyer) Bruyns
- Ceropegia minor (E.A.Bruce) Bruyns
- Ceropegia mirabilis H.Huber
- Ceropegia modestantha Bruyns
- Ceropegia mohanramii S.R.Yadav, M.N.Gavade & Sardesai
- Ceropegia molaventi (Peckover & A.E.van Wyk) Bruyns
- Ceropegia monteiroae Hook.f.
- Ceropegia monticola W.W.Sm.
- Ceropegia montiphila Bruyns
- Ceropegia mucheveensis M.G.Gilbert
- Ceropegia muliensis W.W.Sm.
- Ceropegia multiflora Baker
- Ceropegia muzingana Malaisse
- Ceropegia mwinilungensis M.G.Gilbert

== N ==
- Ceropegia nallamalayana (K.Prasad & B.R.P.Rao) Kottaim.
- Ceropegia namaquensis Bruyns
- Ceropegia namibiensis Peckover
- Ceropegia nampyana Manudev, Kambale & Pramod
- Ceropegia namuliensis Bruyns
- Ceropegia nana Collett & Hemsl.
- Ceropegia nanior Bruyns
- Ceropegia neoarachnoidea Bruyns
- Ceropegia neocompta Bruyns
- Ceropegia neofurcata Bruyns
- Ceropegia neo-omissa Bruyns
- Ceropegia nepalensis (Radcl.-Sm.) Bruyns
- Ceropegia nephroloba (H.Huber) Bruyns
- Ceropegia ngomensis (R.A.Dyer) Bruyns
- Ceropegia nigidiana (Raja Kullayisw., Sandhyar. & Pull.) Kottaim.
- Ceropegia nigra N.E.Br.
- Ceropegia nilotica Kotschy
- Ceropegia noorjahaniae M.A.Ansari
- Ceropegia nutans (Bruyns) Bruyns

== O ==
- Ceropegia obtusa Lour.
- Ceropegia occidens Bruyns
- Ceropegia occidentalis R.A.Dyer
- Ceropegia occulta R.A.Dyer
- Ceropegia oculata Hook.
- Ceropegia odorata Nimmo ex Hook.f.
- Ceropegia oiantha (Schltr.) Bruyns
- Ceropegia omissa H.Huber

== P – Q ==
- Ceropegia pachypodium (R.A.Dyer) Bruyns
- Ceropegia pachystelma Schltr.
- Ceropegia panchganiensis Blatt. & McCann
- Ceropegia paohsingensis Y.Tsiang & P.T.Li
- Ceropegia papillata N.E.Br.
- Ceropegia paricyma N.E.Br.
- Ceropegia parviflora Trimen
- Ceropegia parvior Bruyns
- Ceropegia parvissima Bruyns
- Ceropegia penchalakonensis (Rasingam, Chorghe, Meve, Sankara Rao & Prasanna) Kottaim.
- Ceropegia perdita (R.A.Dyer) Bruyns
- Ceropegia petignatii Rauh
- Ceropegia petrophila Bruyns
- Ceropegia peulhorum A.Chev.
- Ceropegia phuchongensis Kidyoo & K.Suwann.
- Ceropegia plocamoides (Oliv.) Bruyns
- Ceropegia poluniniana P.Bruyns
- Ceropegia porphyrotricha W.W.Sm.
- Ceropegia praelonga (S.Moore) Bruyns
- Ceropegia praetermissa J.Raynal & A.Raynal
- Ceropegia prostrata (E.A.Bruce) Bruyns
- Ceropegia pruinosior Bruyns
- Ceropegia pseudolugardiae Bruyns
- Ceropegia pseudorhynchantha Bruyns
- Ceropegia pubescens Wall.
- Ceropegia pulchellior Bruyns
- Ceropegia pullaiahiana Bruyns
- Ceropegia pullaiahii Raja Kullayisw., Sandhyar. & Karupp.
- Ceropegia punctifera Bruyns
- Ceropegia purpurascens K.Schum.
- Ceropegia pusilla Wight & Arn.
- Ceropegia pygmaea Schinz

== R ==
- Ceropegia racemosa N.E.Br.
- Ceropegia radicans Schltr.
- Ceropegia ramosissima (Schltr.) Bruyns
- Ceropegia rangacharii (Gamble) Kottaim.
- Ceropegia rapinatiana (Britto & Bruyns) Bruyns
- Ceropegia ravikumariana Kambale & Gnanasek.
- Ceropegia recurvata M.G.Gilbert
- Ceropegia recurviloba Bruyns
- Ceropegia reflexa Hanácek
- Ceropegia rehmannii (Schltr.) Bruyns
- Ceropegia remota (R.A.Dyer) Bruyns
- Ceropegia rendallii N.E.Br.
- Ceropegia rhynchantha Schltr.
- Ceropegia richardsiae Masinde
- Ceropegia ringens A.Rich.
- Ceropegia ringoetii De Wild.
- Ceropegia robinsonii M.G.Gilbert
- Ceropegia robivelonae Rauh & Gerold
- Ceropegia rollae Hemadri
- Ceropegia rubella (E.Mey.) Bruyns
- Ceropegia rudatisii Schltr.
- Ceropegia rupicola Deflers

== S ==
- Ceropegia sabuliphila Bruyns
- Ceropegia sahyadrica Ansari & B.G.P.Kulk.
- Ceropegia saldanhae (Britto & Bruyns) Bruyns
- Ceropegia salicifolia H.Huber
- Ceropegia sandersoniana Bruyns
- Ceropegia sandersonii Decne. ex Hook.f.
- Ceropegia sankuruensis Schltr.
- Ceropegia santapaui Wadhwa & Ansari
- Ceropegia saxatilis Jum. & H.Perrier
- Ceropegia scabra Jum. & H.Perrier
- Ceropegia scabriflora N.E.Br.
- Ceropegia schinziata Bruyns
- Ceropegia schizoglossoides (Schltr.) Bruyns
- Ceropegia schliebenii Markgr.
- Ceropegia schoenlandiana (Schltr.) Bruyns
- Ceropegia schultzei (Schltr.) Bruyns
- Ceropegia schumanniana Swarupan. & Mangaly
- Ceropegia sepium Deflers
- Ceropegia seshachalamensis (K.Prasad & Prasanna) Kottaim.
- Ceropegia setosa (Peckover) Bruyns
- Ceropegia shrirangii (Kambale, Gholave & Sardesai) Kottaim.
- Ceropegia simoneae Rauh
- Ceropegia simplex (Schltr.) Bruyns
- Ceropegia sinoerecta M.G.Gilbert & P.T.Li
- Ceropegia sobolifera N.E.Br.
- Ceropegia somalensis Chiov.
- Ceropegia sootepensis Craib
- Ceropegia spaniflora Bruyns
- Ceropegia spathulata (Lindl.) Bruyns
- Ceropegia spatuliloba M.G.Gilbert
- Ceropegia speciosa H.Huber
- Ceropegia spiralis Wight
- Ceropegia stapeliiformis Haw.
- Ceropegia stellata (E.A.Bruce & R.A.Dyer) Bruyns
- Ceropegia stenantha K.Schum.
- Ceropegia stenifolia Bruyns
- Ceropegia stenoloba Hochst. ex Chiov.
- Ceropegia stenophylla C.K.Schneid.
- Ceropegia stentiae E.A.Bruce
- Ceropegia striata Meve & Masinde
- Ceropegia stylesii Heiduk
- Ceropegia subaphylla K.Schum.
- Ceropegia suddeei Kidyoo
- Ceropegia sunhangiana P.R.Luo & T.Deng
- Ceropegia swarupa (Kishore & Goyder) Bruyns
- Ceropegia swazica (R.A.Dyer) Bruyns
- Ceropegia swaziorum D.V.Field

== T ==
- Ceropegia tabularia (R.A.Dyer) Bruyns
- Ceropegia talbotii S.Moore
- Ceropegia tanzaniensis Peckover
- Ceropegia taprobanica H.Huber
- Ceropegia tavalla (K.Schum.) Bruyns
- Ceropegia tenella (R.A.Dyer) Bruyns
- Ceropegia teniana Hand.-Mazz.
- Ceropegia tenuicaulis Kidyoo
- Ceropegia tenuior Bruyns
- Ceropegia tenuissifolia Bruyns
- Ceropegia terebriformis Bester
- Ceropegia thailandica Meve
- Ceropegia thaithongiae Kidyoo
- Ceropegia theronii (Bruyns) Bruyns
- Ceropegia thorelii Costantin
- Ceropegia thorutii Kidyoo
- Ceropegia thunbergii (N.E.Br.) Bruyns
- Ceropegia thwaitesii Hook.
- Ceropegia tihamana Chaudhary & Lavranos
- Ceropegia togoensis (Schltr.) M.G.Gilbert
- Ceropegia tomentosa Schltr.
- Ceropegia tourana A.Chev.
- Ceropegia tribounii Kidyoo
- Ceropegia trichantha Hemsl.
- Ceropegia tundavalensis Bruyns
- Ceropegia turricula E.A.Bruce

== U – V ==
- Ceropegia ugeni C.E.C.Fisch.
- Ceropegia umbraticola K.Schum.
- Ceropegia vahrmeijeri (R.A.Dyer) Bruyns
- Ceropegia vanderystii De Wild.
- Ceropegia variegata Decne.
- Ceropegia vartakii (Kambale & S.R.Yadav) Bruyns
- Ceropegia vemanae (A.M.Reddy, M.V.S.Babu & K.Prasad) Kottaim.
- Ceropegia verticillata Masinde
- Ceropegia vietnamensis Nguyen-Phi & Luu
- Ceropegia villosa (Schltr.) Bruyns
- Ceropegia vincifolia Hook.
- Ceropegia volubicaulis Bruyns
- Ceropegia volubilis N.E.Br.

== W – Z ==
- Ceropegia wallichii Wight
- Ceropegia waterbergensis (Peckover) Bruyns
- Ceropegia woodii Schltr.
- Ceropegia yampwapwa Masinde
- Ceropegia yemenensis Meve & Mangelsdorff
- Ceropegia yorubana Schltr.
- Ceropegia zambesiaca Masinde & Meve
- Ceropegia zeyheri Schltr.
