= Ceropegia evansii =

Scientific classification
- Kingdom: Plantae
- Clade: Tracheophytes
- Clade: Angiosperms
- Clade: Eudicots
- Clade: Asterids
- Order: Gentianales
- Family: Apocynaceae
- Genus: Ceropegia
- Species: C. evansii

Binomial name
- Ceropegia evansii McCann

Species of plant

Ceropegia evansii is a species of flower in the family Asclepiadoideae. It is found in the Indian state of Maharashtra and is allegedly difficult to find, residing at high elevations in bushes.
