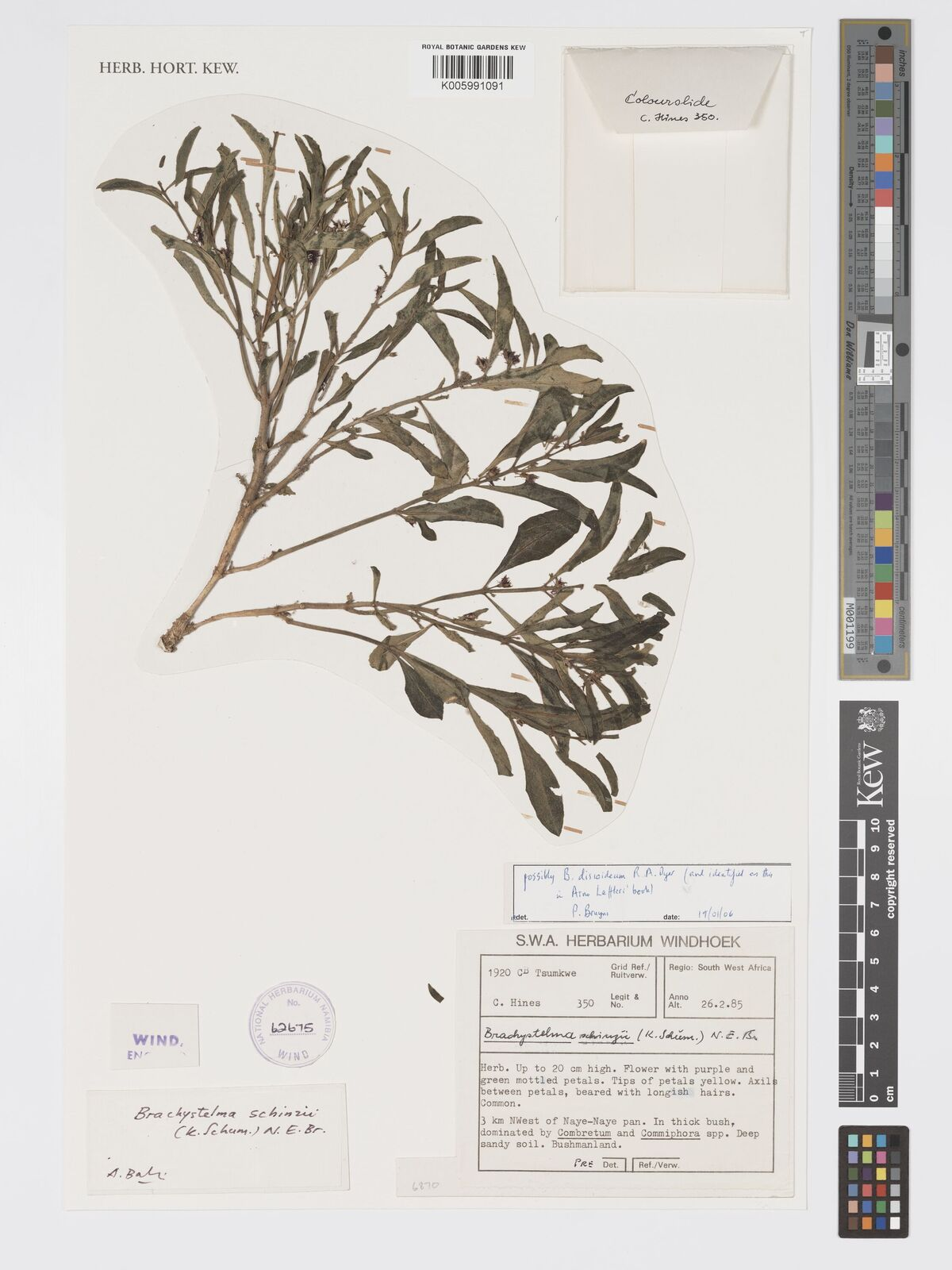

Scientific classification
- Kingdom: Plantae
- Clade: Embryophytes
- Clade: Tracheophytes
- Clade: Spermatophytes
- Clade: Angiosperms
- Clade: Eudicots
- Clade: Asterids
- Order: Gentianales
- Family: Apocynaceae
- Genus: Ceropegia
- Species: C. discoidea

Binomial name
- Ceropegia discoidea (R.A.Dyer) Bruyns

Synonyms
- Brachystelma discoideum

= Ceropegia discoidea =

Species of plant endemic to South Africa

Ceropegia discoidea is a species of critically endangered and possibly extinct plant endemic to northern Gauteng in South Africa.

== Range and habitat ==
Ceropegia discoidea's range is near Soshanguve, north of Pretoria (and possibly to western Mpumalanga and north-eastern North West province). It is found in central sandy bushveld habitat.

== Taxonomy ==
Ceropegia discoidea was previously classified as Brachystelma discoideum.

== Conservation status ==
In its previous classification as Brachystelma discoideum in 2016, the species was listed as critically endangered and possibly extinct in the Red List of South African Plants. It had not been seen in its type locality since 1968.
