= Ceropegia huberi =

Scientific classification
- Kingdom: Plantae
- Clade: Tracheophytes
- Clade: Angiosperms
- Clade: Eudicots
- Clade: Asterids
- Order: Gentianales
- Family: Apocynaceae
- Genus: Ceropegia
- Species: C. huberi

Binomial name
- Ceropegia huberi Ansari

Species of plant

Ceropegia huberi is a species of plant in the family Apocynaceae.

== Description ==
Ceropegia huberi is a trailing, twining monsoonal herb with underground tuber. The leaves are hairy, lance-shaped. It differs from any other Indian Ceropegia in having pure white, depressed star-shaped corolla, instead of a tubular elongated one.

== Range and habitat ==
It is a very rare trailing, twining herb restricted to the highest reaches of the Western Ghats hills in Pune and Kolhapur district. It has not been reported from any other areas. This species is restricted to the Northern Western Ghats, India. It occurs on rocky cliffs at altitudes above 1000m ASl

== Taxonomy ==
Named after Dr. Huber for his great contribution to the taxonomy of Ceropegia.
