= Ceropegia schinziata =

Conservation status
- Least Concern (IUCN 3.1)

Scientific classification
- Kingdom: Plantae
- Clade: Tracheophytes
- Clade: Angiosperms
- Clade: Eudicots
- Clade: Asterids
- Order: Gentianales
- Family: Apocynaceae
- Genus: Ceropegia
- Species: C. schinziata

Binomial name
- Ceropegia schinziata Bruyns

Synonyms
- Brachystelma schinzii (K.Schum.) N.E.Br.; Craterostemma schinzii K.Schum.

Species of plant

Ceropegia schinziata is a species of plant in the family Apocynaceae. It is a tuberous geophyte native to northern Namibia and western Zimbabwe.

The species was first described as Craterostemma schinzii by Karl Moritz Schumann in 1893. In 2017 Peter Vincent Bruyns renamed the species Ceropegia schinziata.
