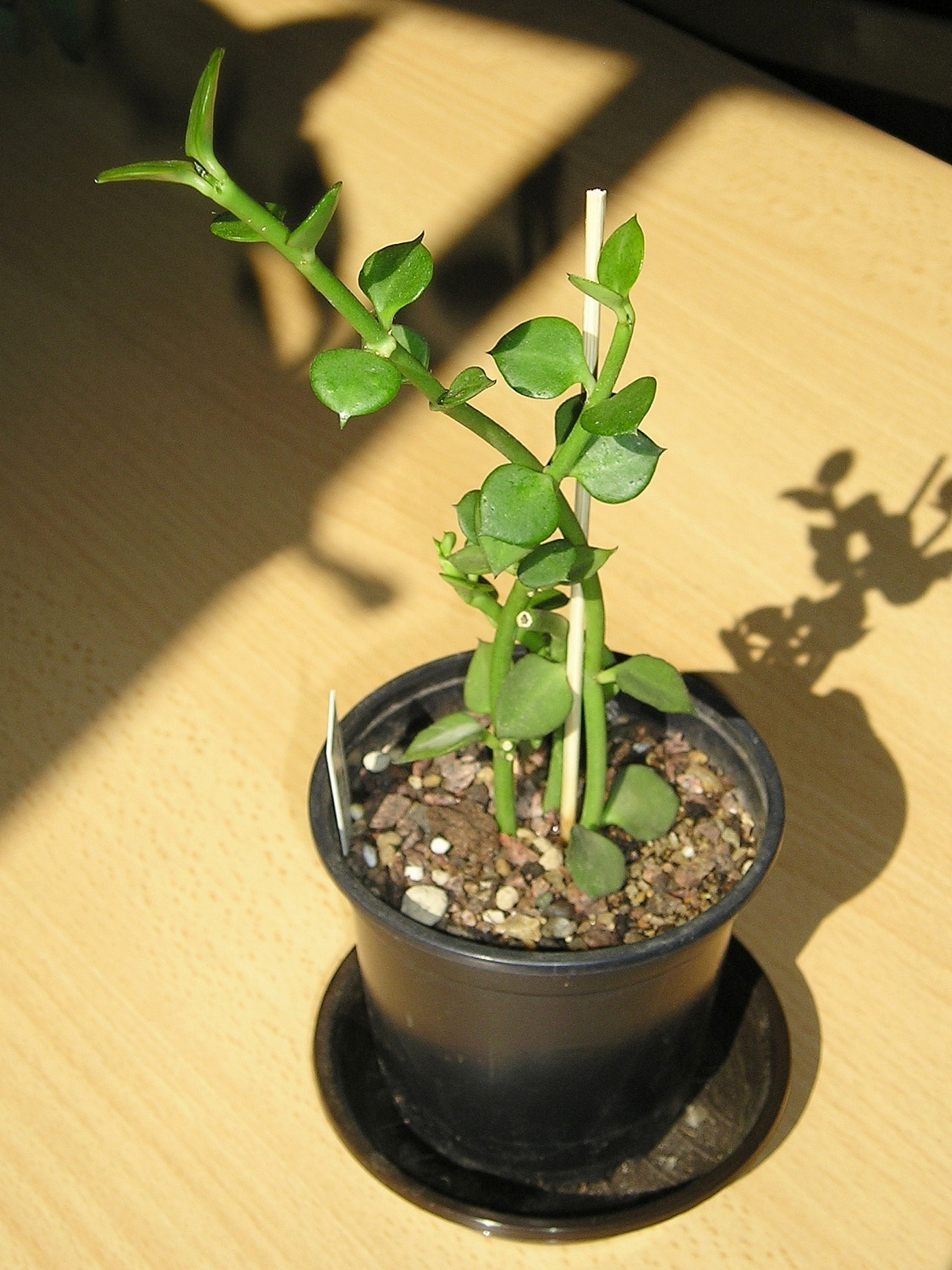

Scientific classification
- Kingdom: Plantae
- Clade: Tracheophytes
- Clade: Angiosperms
- Clade: Eudicots
- Clade: Asterids
- Order: Gentianales
- Family: Apocynaceae
- Genus: Ceropegia
- Species: C. radicans

Binomial name
- Ceropegia radicans Schltr.

Subspecies
- Ceropegia radicans smithii (M.R.Hend.) R.A.Dyer; Ceropegia radicans radicans J.P. Roux

= Ceropegia radicans =

Species of herb

Ceropegia radicans is a species of herb in the family Apocynaceae. The leaves are fleshy and glabrous and it has a large cage-like flower with a slender tube swollen at the base, and divided into five segments at the top. It grows up to 20cm in height.
