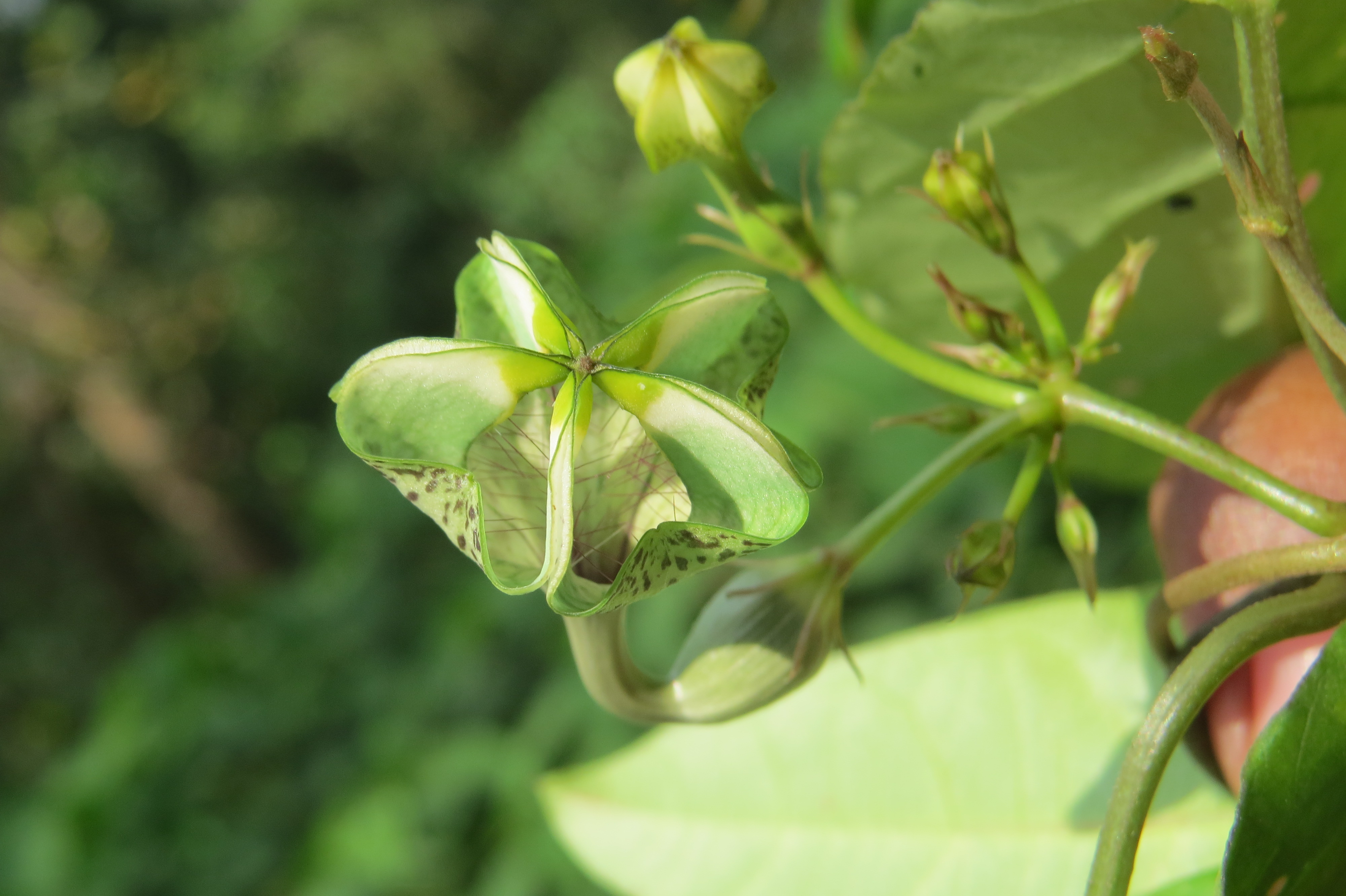
- At Peravoor

Scientific classification
- Kingdom: Plantae
- Clade: Tracheophytes
- Clade: Angiosperms
- Clade: Eudicots
- Clade: Asterids
- Order: Gentianales
- Family: Apocynaceae
- Genus: Ceropegia
- Species: C. elegans

Binomial name
- Ceropegia elegans (Wall.)

Subspecies
- Ceropegia elegans var. elegans; Ceropegia elegans var. gardneri (Hook.) Huber (syn. Ceropegia gardneri (Hook.)); Ceropegia elegans var. sandersonii; Ceropegia elegans var. walkerae (Wight) Trimen, 1895

Synonyms
- Ceropegia myosorensis (Wight); Ceropegia walkeriae (Wight)

= Ceropegia elegans =

Species of plant

Ceropegia elegans is a plant species that belongs to the genus Ceropegia. It is endemic to India and Sri Lanka.
