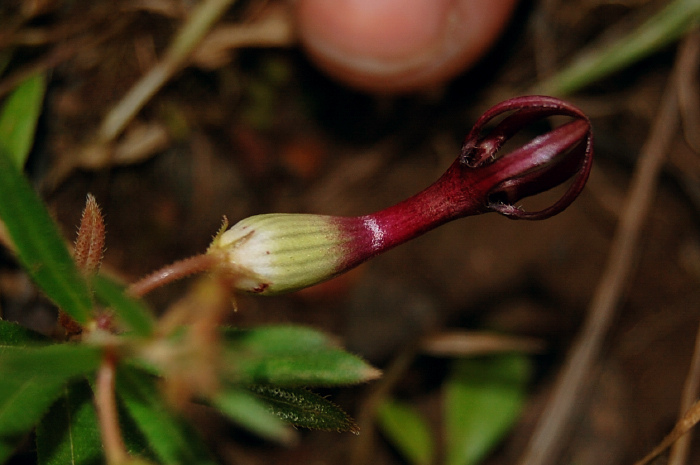

Conservation status
- Endangered (IUCN 3.1)

Scientific classification
- Kingdom: Plantae
- Clade: Embryophytes
- Clade: Tracheophytes
- Clade: Spermatophytes
- Clade: Angiosperms
- Clade: Eudicots
- Clade: Asterids
- Order: Gentianales
- Family: Apocynaceae
- Genus: Ceropegia
- Species: C. jainii

Binomial name
- Ceropegia jainii Ansari & B.G. Kulk, 1982

= Ceropegia jainii =

Species of flowering plant

Ceropegia jainii is a species of flowering plant in the family Apocynaceae. It is an endangered species found only in western India.

== Ecology ==
Ceropegia jainii is a rare plant found in the Indian subcontinent. The specific conditions it requires to grow both limit its natural distribution and make propagation difficult outside of the wild, though there has been some success at developing in vitro cultivation techniques.

C. jainii grows in open, sunny, rocky areas at elevations between 800 and 1,200 metres (2,600 and 3,900 ft) above sea level in the northern Western Ghats. It is endemic to the Indian states of Maharashtra and Karnataka. The species has an extremely fragmented population; it has an extent of occurrence of 2,549 km^{2} (984 sq mi) and an area of occupancy of only 48 km^{2} (19 sq mi). It is known to occur in just six locations in this range. IUCN assesses C. jainii as endangered and estimates a total population of 250–350 exist, though no detailed survey has taken place.

The species faces several threats to its habitat. Its entire range is threatened by bauxite mining. Some of the locations in which it is found are threatened by road construction or are vulnerable to landslides. Trampling, grazing, fires, poaching, and wind farm development are all concerns across some or all of the plant's range. C. jainii also has edible tubers and has been foraged by local human populations. The species is sought by tourists and wildlife photographers, who can disturb the plant's habitat and disrupt its insect-trapping pollination mechanism, which is highly specialized. That pollination mechanism also makes gene exchange between the plant's disparate populations uncommon.

== Etymology ==
This species was named in honor of S.K.Jain, the then director of Botanical Survey of India.
