= Ceropegia dinteri =

Conservation status
- Least Concern (IUCN 3.1)

Scientific classification
- Kingdom: Plantae
- Clade: Tracheophytes
- Clade: Angiosperms
- Clade: Eudicots
- Clade: Asterids
- Order: Gentianales
- Family: Apocynaceae
- Genus: Ceropegia
- Species: C. dinteri

Binomial name
- Ceropegia dinteri Schltr.

Species of plant

Ceropegia dinteri is a species of plant in the family Apocynaceae. It is endemic to Namibia. Its natural habitats are subtropical or tropical dry shrubland and rocky areas.
