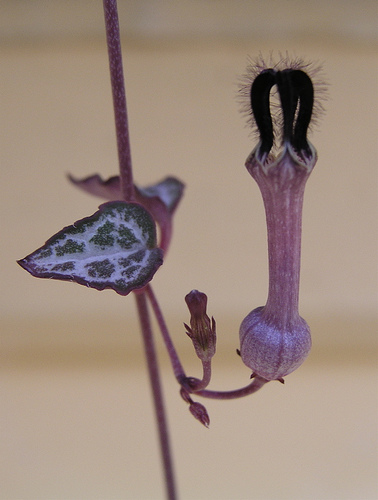

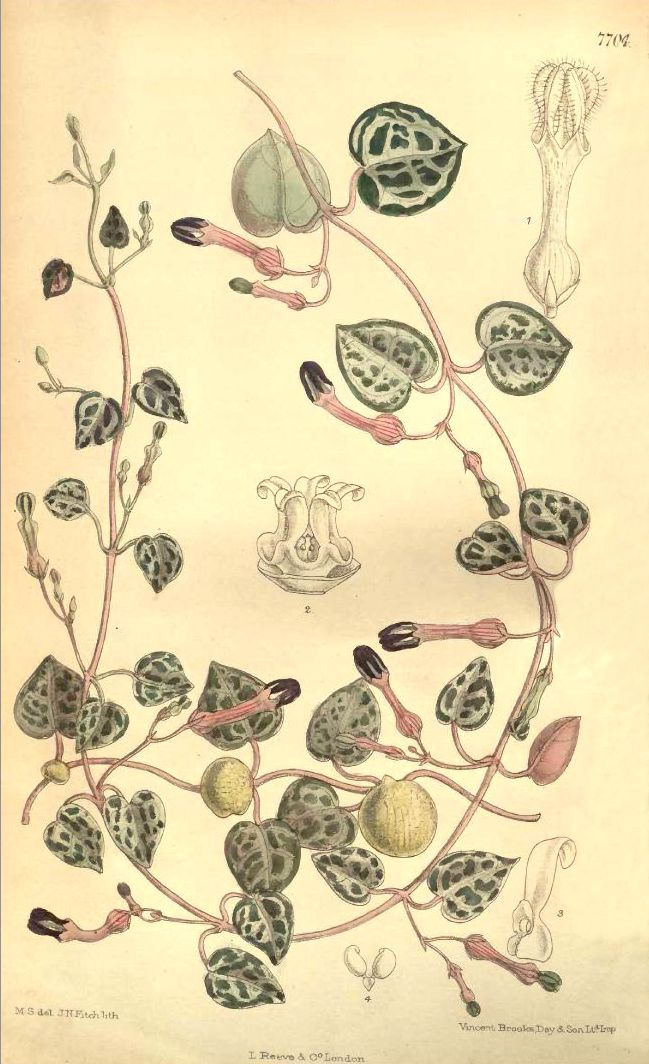
- Curtis's Botanical Magazine

Scientific classification
- Kingdom: Plantae
- Clade: Tracheophytes
- Clade: Angiosperms
- Clade: Eudicots
- Clade: Asterids
- Order: Gentianales
- Family: Apocynaceae
- Genus: Ceropegia
- Species: C. woodii

Binomial name
- Ceropegia woodii Schltr.

Synonyms
- Ceropegia barbertonensis N.E.Br.; Ceropegia collaricorona Werderm.; Ceropegia euryacme Schltr.; Ceropegia hastata N.E.Br.; Ceropegia leptocarpa Schltr.; Ceropegia schoenlandii N.E.Br.

= Ceropegia woodii =

Species of plant

Ceropegia woodii is a flowering plant in the dogbane family Apocynaceae, native to South Africa, Eswatini and Zimbabwe. It is sometimes treated as a subspecies of the related Ceropegia linearis, as C. linearis subsp. woodii. Common names include chain of hearts, collar of hearts, string of hearts, rosary vine, hearts-on-a-string, and sweetheart vine.

== History ==
In 1881, the species was discovered hanging from rocks on Groenberg Mountain in Western Cape, South Africa, at an altitude of 1800 feet, by John Medley Wood, curator of the Durban Botanic Gardens. Thirteen years later, in 1894, he sent a living plant to the Royal Botanic Gardens, Kew in the United Kingdom. The plant that had been sent to Kew subsequently flowered, providing the material for Plate 7704 of Curtis's Botanical Magazine published in 1900. The prolific botanical artist Matilda Smith prepared the plate, while the Kew taxonomist, N. E. Brown, produced a detailed description, naming the plant after its discoverer. Its trailing habit, neat appearance, and tolerance of neglect, made it an ideal plant for hanging baskets.

== Description ==
It is an evergreen succulent trailing vine that grows to 10 centimetres (3.9 in) in height and spreads to reach up to 2–4 metres (6 ft 7 in – 13 ft 1 in) in length. Its leaves are shaped like hearts, about 1–2 cm wide and long. When exposed to sufficient light they have a deep green colour; under insufficient lighting the leaves are pale green. With age it develops a woody caudex at its base. The roots, and occasionally the stems, will often develop tubers. On the stems these tubers form at nodes and are likely the reason for the common name of rosary vine.

In general, the flower form is similar to those of other Ceropegia species. The corolla grows to 3 cm in length and is a mixed colouring of off-white and pale magenta. The five petals are a deeper purple.

== Cultivation and uses ==
Ceropegia woodii is tender, and in temperate regions it is a very popular houseplant often grown in hanging baskets so the long trailing branches may hang down with their leaves spaced out like a row of large beads. Several cultivars have been selected, some with variegated leaves. It requires excellent drainage, should be watered only when dry, and should never stand in water. Excess water should be removed from plant saucer after watering. It can be grown outdoors only in subtropical and tropical areas having a minimum temperature of 15 °C (59 °F). It typically requires shady conditions consisting of 3–4 hours of indirect sunlight.

This plant has gained the Royal Horticultural Society's Award of Garden Merit (confirmed 2017).
