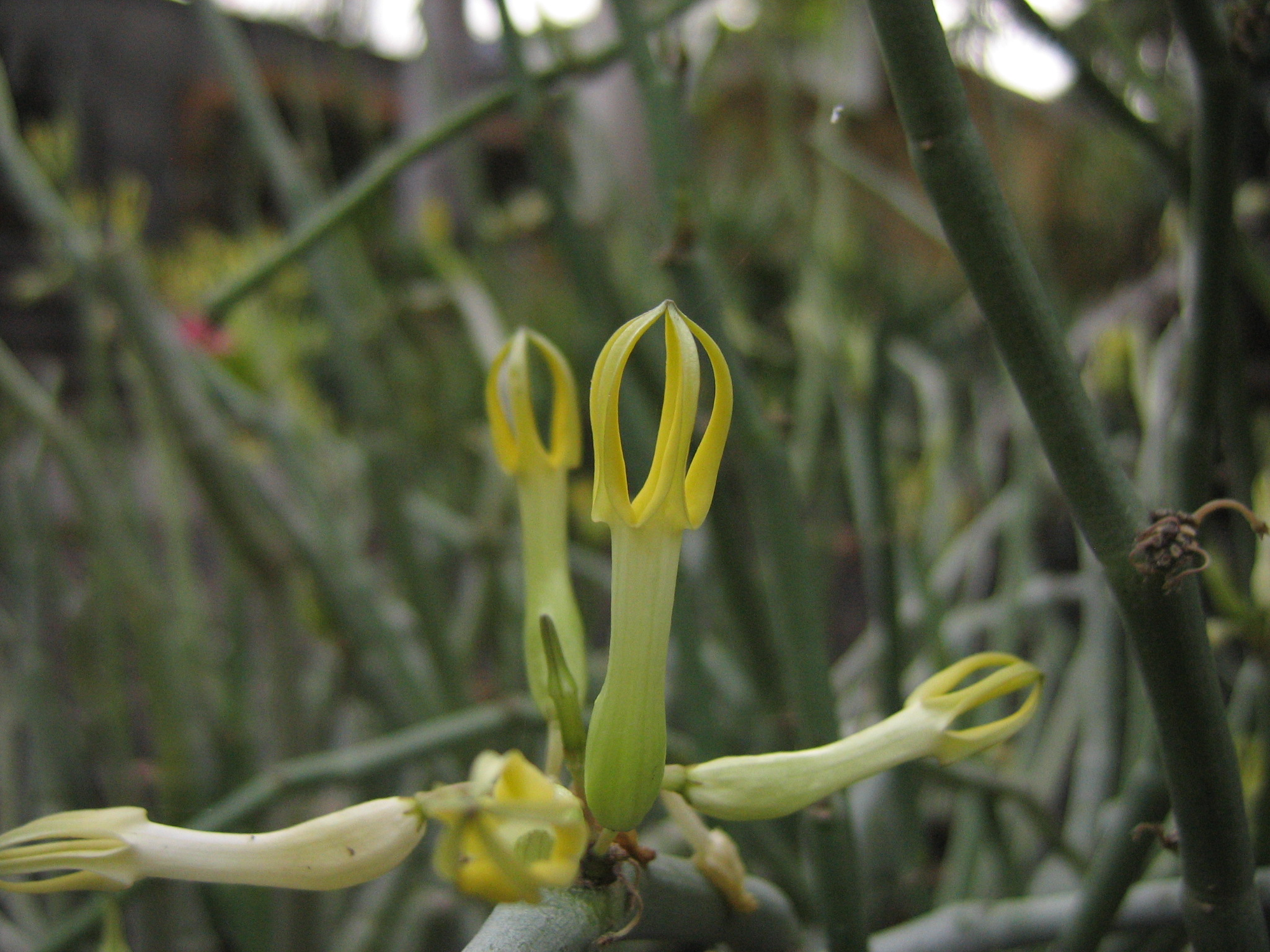

Scientific classification
- Kingdom: Plantae
- Clade: Tracheophytes
- Clade: Angiosperms
- Clade: Eudicots
- Clade: Asterids
- Order: Gentianales
- Family: Apocynaceae
- Genus: Ceropegia
- Species: C. dichotoma

Binomial name
- Ceropegia dichotoma Haw.

= Ceropegia dichotoma =

Species of plant

Ceropegia dichotoma (Spanish: cardoncillo) is a flowering plant in the genus Ceropegia (Apocynaceae). It is endemic to the Canary Islands, where it grows on Tenerife (Macizo de Anaga, Buenavista del Norte and Barranco del Infierno in Adeje), El Hierro, La Gomera, and La Palma in the Tabaibal-Cardonal zone at up to about 600 m altitude. It was first described in 1812.

It can grow up to 1.2 m in height, and is abundant in terrains with good drainage in grainy soil and plenty of sun and prolonged dry climate. The flowers are grouped from two to seven at the end of the trunk; each flower 3 cm long, tubular, pale yellow, with five narrow lobes joined at the tip; flowering is in autumn and winter. The fruit is a pair of large horn-shaped capsules up to 12 cm long.

== Uses ==
The plant is used as an ornamental plant in arid gardens. It requires hot conditions to grow well.
