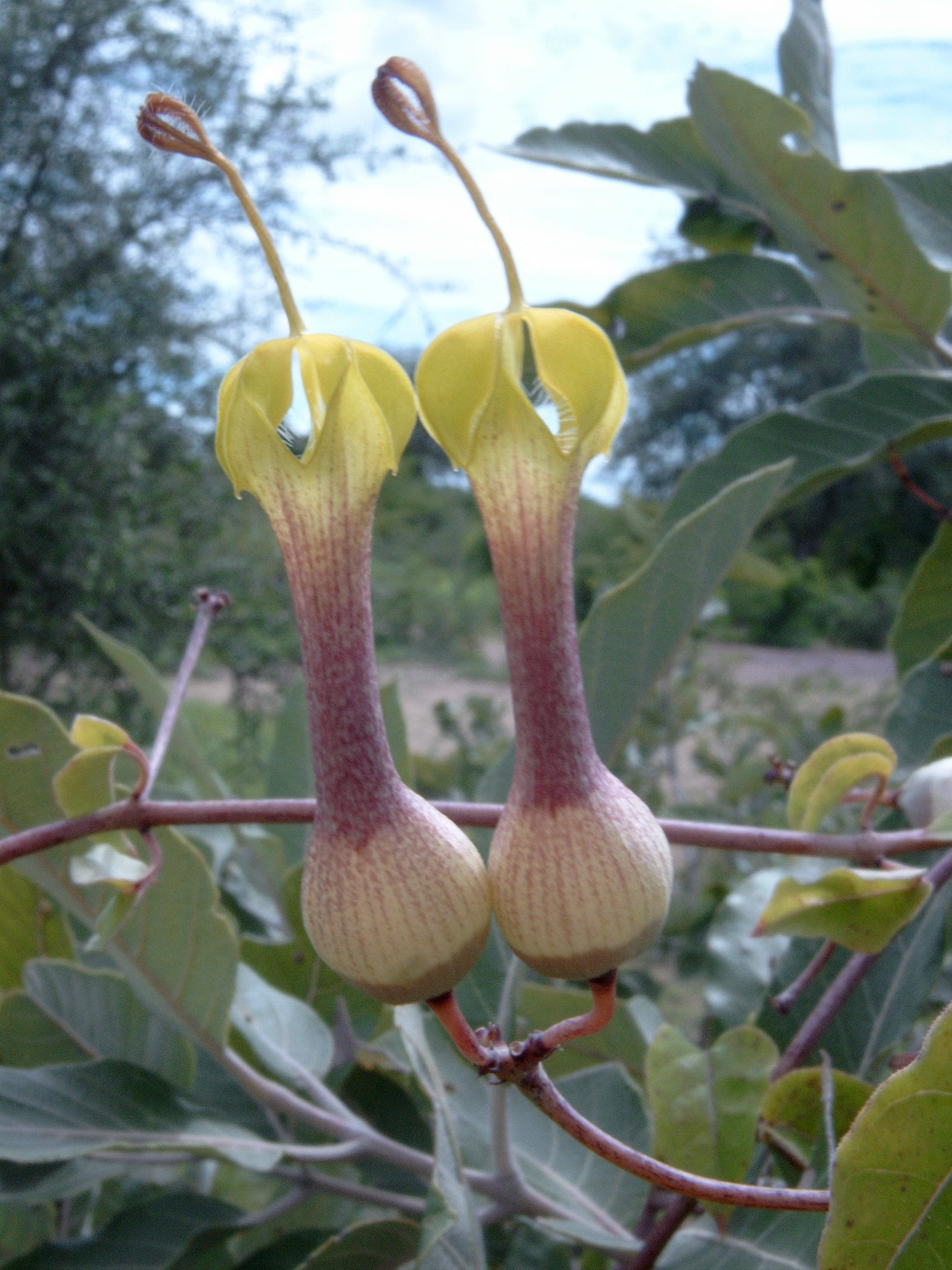

Conservation status
- Vulnerable (IUCN 3.1)

Scientific classification
- Kingdom: Plantae
- Clade: Tracheophytes
- Clade: Angiosperms
- Clade: Eudicots
- Clade: Asterids
- Order: Gentianales
- Family: Apocynaceae
- Genus: Ceropegia
- Species: C. rhynchantha

Binomial name
- Ceropegia rhynchantha Schltr.

= Ceropegia rhynchantha =

Species of plant

Ceropegia rhynchantha is a species of plant in the family Apocynaceae. It occurs in West Africa and has slender flowers, with basal inflation and slight expansion of the tube towards the mouth, as well as relatively long, narrow lobes.
