= Ceropegia striata =

Scientific classification
- Kingdom: Plantae
- Clade: Tracheophytes
- Clade: Angiosperms
- Clade: Eudicots
- Clade: Asterids
- Order: Gentianales
- Family: Apocynaceae
- Genus: Ceropegia
- Species: C. striata

Binomial name
- Ceropegia striata Meve & Masinde

Species of plant

Ceropegia striata is a plant species endemic to Madagascar. It is known only from the Vavavato Massif in the central highlands, at an elevation of approximately 1800 m.

Ceropegia striata is a geophytic plant with a large tuberous base. Stems are thin, green, hairless, less than 3 mm in diameter, twining over other vegetation. Leaves are narrowly elliptic, up to 3 cm long. Flowers usually solitary. Corolla up to 35 mm long, the lower third forming a hollow sphere about 7 mm in diameter, narrowing into a conical upper corolla, whitish green with purple stripes, with a corona on top.
