= Ceropegia aridicola =

Conservation status
- Endangered (IUCN 3.1)

Scientific classification
- Kingdom: Plantae
- Clade: Tracheophytes
- Clade: Angiosperms
- Clade: Eudicots
- Clade: Asterids
- Order: Gentianales
- Family: Apocynaceae
- Genus: Ceropegia
- Species: C. aridicola

Binomial name
- Ceropegia aridicola W.W.Sm.

Species of plant

Ceropegia aridicola is a species of flowering plant in the family Apocynaceae. It is a tuberous geophyte endemic to Yunnan Province in south-central China.
