= Ceropegia anjanerica =

Conservation status
- Endangered (IUCN 3.1)

Scientific classification
- Kingdom: Plantae
- Clade: Embryophytes
- Clade: Tracheophytes
- Clade: Spermatophytes
- Clade: Angiosperms
- Clade: Eudicots
- Clade: Asterids
- Order: Gentianales
- Family: Apocynaceae
- Genus: Ceropegia
- Species: C. anjanerica

Binomial name
- Ceropegia anjanerica Malpure, M.Y.Kamble & S.R.Yadav

Species of flowering plant

Ceropegia anjanerica is a species of flowering plant in the family Apocynaceae. Flowers are 2.5–3.5 cm (1.0–1.4 in) long, usually slightly curved and greenish yellow in color and the plants are up to 20 cm (7.9 in) high. It is endemic to the Anjaneri Hills area of Nashik district.
