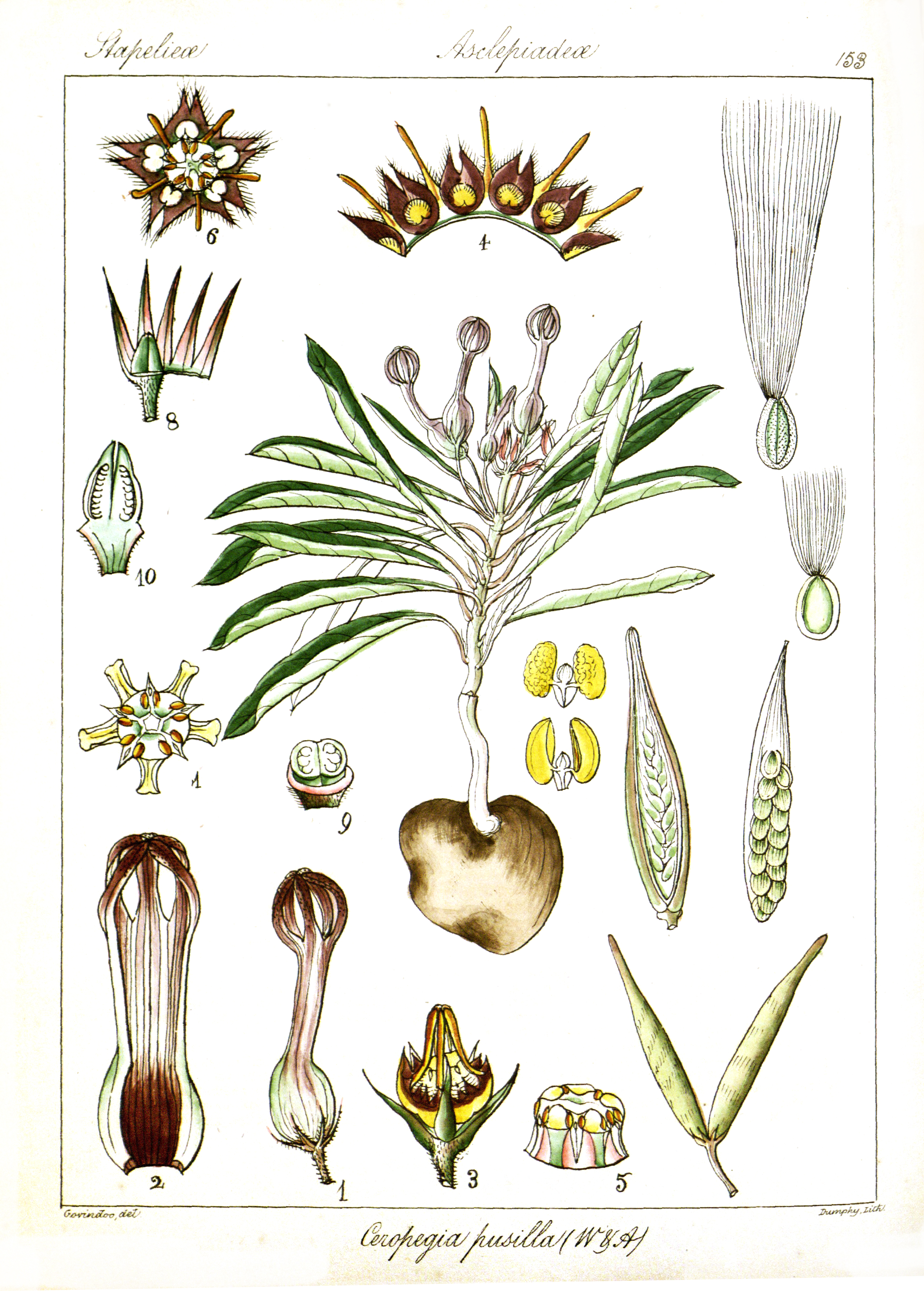

Scientific classification
- Kingdom: Plantae
- Clade: Tracheophytes
- Clade: Angiosperms
- Clade: Eudicots
- Clade: Asterids
- Order: Gentianales
- Family: Apocynaceae
- Genus: Ceropegia
- Species: C. pusilla

Binomial name
- Ceropegia pusilla Wight & Arn.

= Ceropegia pusilla =

Species of herb

Ceropegia pusilla is a species of herb in the family Apocynaceae.

== Uses ==
The tuber of this plant is edible and contains the alkaloid ceropegin. In Ayurveda, it is used in formulations effective against various ailments, particularly diarrhea, dysentery, and syphilis. It is rich in nutritive starch and possesses tonic and blood-purifying properties.
