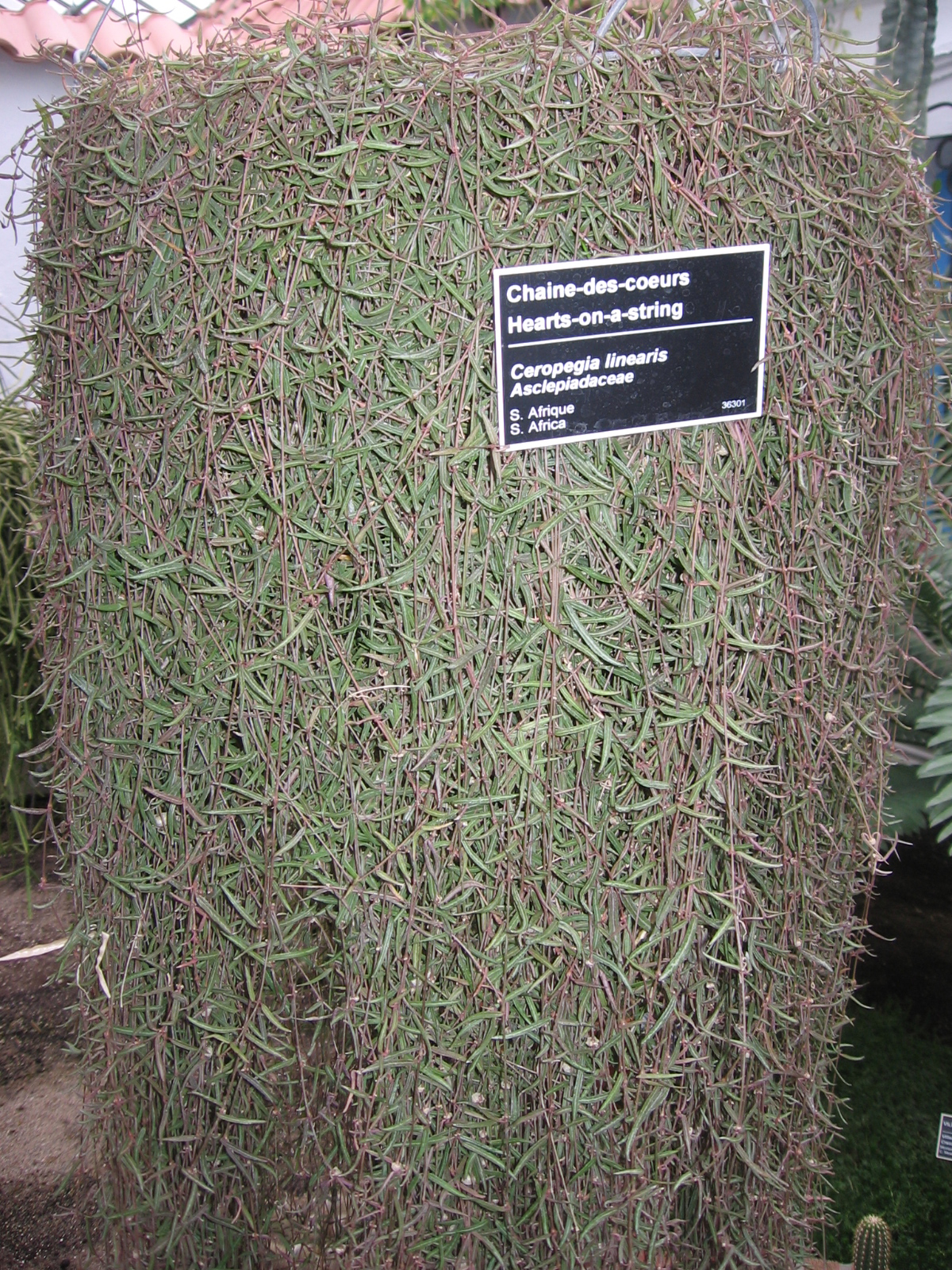
- Montreal Botanical Garden

Scientific classification
- Kingdom: Plantae
- Clade: Embryophytes
- Clade: Tracheophytes
- Clade: Spermatophytes
- Clade: Angiosperms
- Clade: Eudicots
- Clade: Asterids
- Order: Gentianales
- Family: Apocynaceae
- Genus: Ceropegia
- Species: C. linearis

Binomial name
- Ceropegia linearis E.Mey.

Synonyms
- Ceropegia afrorum Schltr.; Ceropegia afrorum var. dubia N.E.Br.

= Ceropegia linearis =

Species of plant

Ceropegia linearis, also known as string-of-needles, is a species of flowering plant in the family Apocynaceae, native to Southern Africa. The popular houseplant Ceropegia woodii is sometimes treated as a subspecies of C. linearis, as C. linearis subsp. woodii. It has gained the Royal Horticultural Society's Award of Garden Merit.
