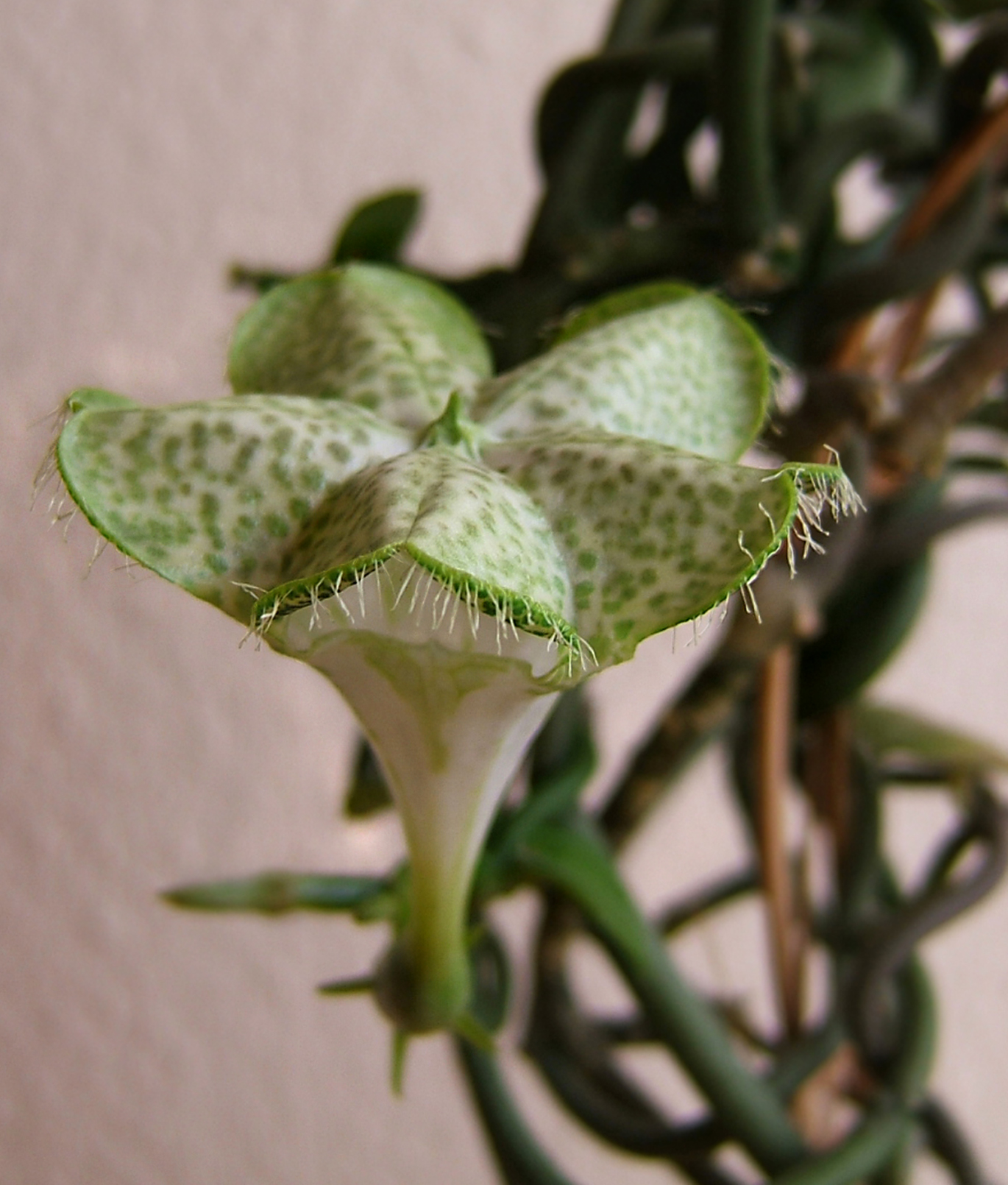

Scientific classification
- Kingdom: Plantae
- Clade: Tracheophytes
- Clade: Angiosperms
- Clade: Eudicots
- Clade: Asterids
- Order: Gentianales
- Family: Apocynaceae
- Genus: Ceropegia
- Species: C. sandersonii

Binomial name
- Ceropegia sandersonii Decne. ex Hook.f.

= Ceropegia sandersonii =

Species of plant

Ceropegia sandersonii is a species of flowering plant in the family Apocynaceae that is native to Mozambique, South Africa, and Eswatini. Common names are parachute plant, fountain flower, and umbrella plant.

It is an evergreen, prostrate, slender twiner, nearly hairless, with sparse, succulent leaves. The roots form narrowly fusiform clusters. The distinctive greenish white funnel-shaped (having a corolla-tube) flowers are 5–7 cm long and are placed on a delicate stalk. Due to the fact that the corolla lobes are partially fused, the opening of the flowers is partially inhibited. The tips of the petals do not separate, but instead form a roof or umbrella-like dome on the flower, while the fused bottom forms the tube. The openings between the petals are also referred to as windows, hence the name windowed flowers. The flower itself serves as a biological fly-pollinated pitfall-trap, that traps flies when they descend into the corolla tube. Small hairs that point downwards prevent the insect from escaping. Once trapped, the fly is thoroughly covered in pollen and only released when the flower reaches the end of its life and the hairs weaken.

This species attracts Desmometopa flies of the family Milichiidae by simulating the scent of an injured honey bee, tricking the flies into pollinating.

== Cultivation ==
In temperate regions this tender plant is cultivated as a houseplant. It has gained the Royal Horticultural Society's Award of Garden Merit (confirmed 2017).
