= Ceropegia schultzei =

Conservation status
- Least Concern (IUCN 3.1)

Scientific classification
- Kingdom: Plantae
- Clade: Tracheophytes
- Clade: Angiosperms
- Clade: Eudicots
- Clade: Asterids
- Order: Gentianales
- Family: Apocynaceae
- Genus: Ceropegia
- Species: C. schultzei

Binomial name
- Ceropegia schultzei (Schltr.) Bruyns

Synonyms
- Brachystelma schultzei (Schltr.) Bruyns; Kinepetalum schultzei Schltr.; Tenaris schultzei (Schltr.) E.Phillips

Species of plant

Ceropegia schultzei is a species of flowering plant in the family Apocynaceae. It is a tuberous geophyte native to southwestern Botswana and central Namibia. Its natural habitat is dry savanna. It is threatened by habitat loss.

The species was first described as Kinepetalum schultzei by Rudolf Schlechter in 1913. In 2017 Peter Vincent Bruyns placed the species in genus Ceropegia as C. schultzei.
