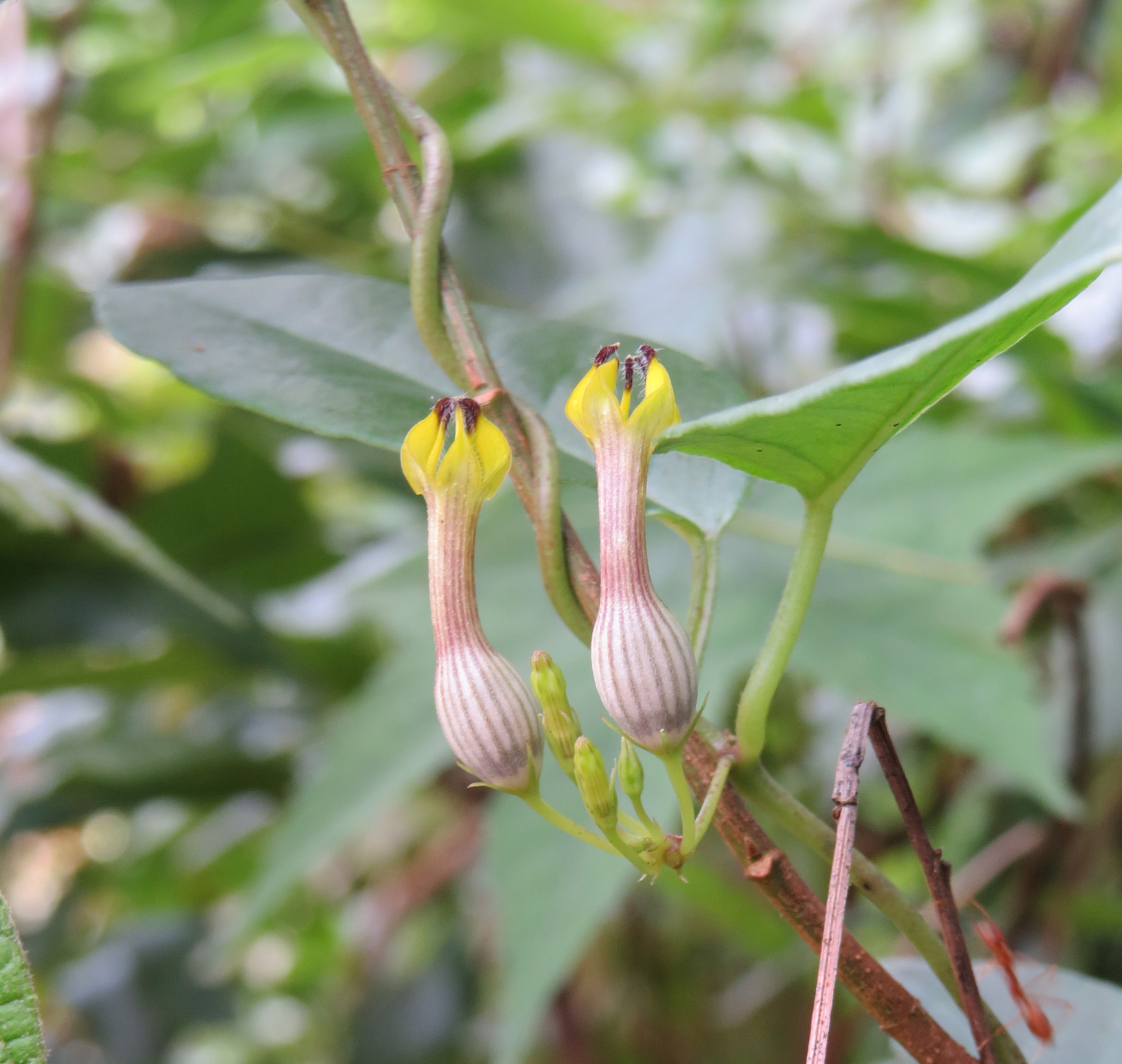

Scientific classification
- Kingdom: Plantae
- Clade: Tracheophytes
- Clade: Angiosperms
- Clade: Eudicots
- Clade: Asterids
- Order: Gentianales
- Family: Apocynaceae
- Genus: Ceropegia
- Species: C. candelabrum

Binomial name
- Ceropegia candelabrum L.

Synonyms
- Ceropegia acuminata Dalzell & A.Gibson; Ceropegia biflora L.; Ceropegia candelabriformis St.-Lag.; Ceropegia discreta N.E.Br.; Ceropegia elliotii Hook.f.; Ceropegia longiflora Poir. in Rom. & Schult.; Ceropegia mucronata Roth; Ceropegia tuberosa Roxb.

= Ceropegia candelabrum =

Species of plant

Ceropegia candelabrum is the type species in its genus of plants, belonging the subfamily Asclepiadoideae. The Latin specific epithet candelabrum is derived from the candelabra-like appearance of the inflorescences.

== Vegetative characteristics ==
Ceropegia candelabrum is a perennial, succulent, twining plant with a roundish tuber. The strong, bare shoots have a diameter of 3 to 4 mm. The leaves are stalked. The slightly fleshy leaf blades are linear, elliptical to rounded tip sharpened. They are 2 to 7 cm long and 0.8 to 3.5 cm wide.

== Inflorescence and flowers ==
The inflorescence is borne on a 1 to 3 cm long stem. The bill umbels carry 5 to 12 flowers. The flower stems are 3 to 10 mm long, the sepals about 4 mm. The corolla is 2.5 to 4.5 cm high, greenish yellow colored with red-brown stripes.

== Distribution and ecology ==
The species is found in India and Sri Lanka as well as in Vietnam before. In India, it blooms from August to January. Fruits are formed from September to January.

== Human use and medical importance ==
The tuberous roots are edible and are eaten especially by the poorest, raw or cooked. The plant is also used for various medicinal purposes, so for hemorrhoids, indigestion, headaches and against bites of poisonous animals.

Ceropegia candelabrum is now in the original area has become quite rare. There are already projects for artificial propagation.

== Systematics and taxonomy ==
The species was first described in 1753 by Carl Linnaeus. He referred to table 16 of Hortus Indicus Malabaricus published in 1689 by Henricus van Rhede. In 1795 the species was described again by William Roxburgh as Ceropegia tuberosa, making C. tuberosa a junior synonym of C. candelabrum. Ceropegia candelabrum is the type species of the genus Ceropegia L.

Japtap et al. (1999) distinguish two varieties: Ceropegia candelabrum var. candelabrum and Ceropegia candelabrum var. biflora (L.) Ansari The varieties are not listed by the Plant List, nor the Ceropegia Checklist [8].
