= Ceropegia decidua =

Conservation status
- Least Concern (IUCN 2.3)

Scientific classification
- Kingdom: Plantae
- Clade: Tracheophytes
- Clade: Angiosperms
- Clade: Eudicots
- Clade: Asterids
- Order: Gentianales
- Family: Apocynaceae
- Genus: Ceropegia
- Species: C. decidua

Binomial name
- Ceropegia decidua E.A.Bruce

Species of plant

Ceropegia decidua is a species of flowering plant in the family Apocynaceae. It is a climbing tuberous geophyte native to Eswatini and the Northern Provinces of South Africa.

== Taxonomy ==
There are two subspecies:

- Ceropegia decidua ssp. decidua
- Ceropegia decidua ssp. pretoriensis

== Conservation status ==
Ceropegia decidua ssp. pretoriensis is listed as vulnerable while C. d. decidua is listed as least concern.
