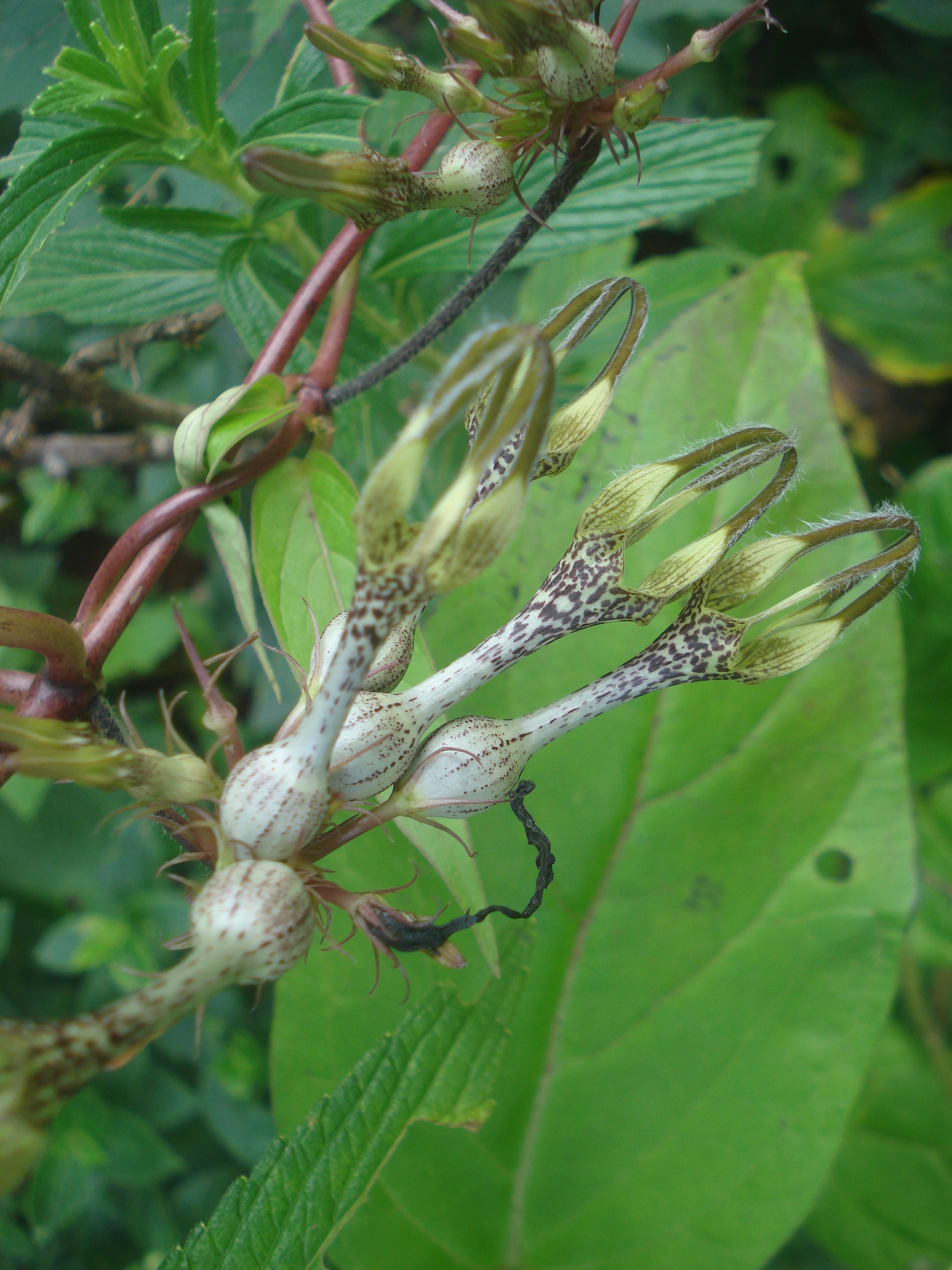

Scientific classification
- Kingdom: Plantae
- Clade: Tracheophytes
- Clade: Angiosperms
- Clade: Eudicots
- Clade: Asterids
- Order: Gentianales
- Family: Apocynaceae
- Genus: Ceropegia
- Species: C. vincifolia

Binomial name
- Ceropegia vincifolia Hook.

= Ceropegia vincifolia =

Species of plant

Ceropegia vincifolia is a species of flowering plant in the family Apocynaceae, native to Western Ghats, in India.
