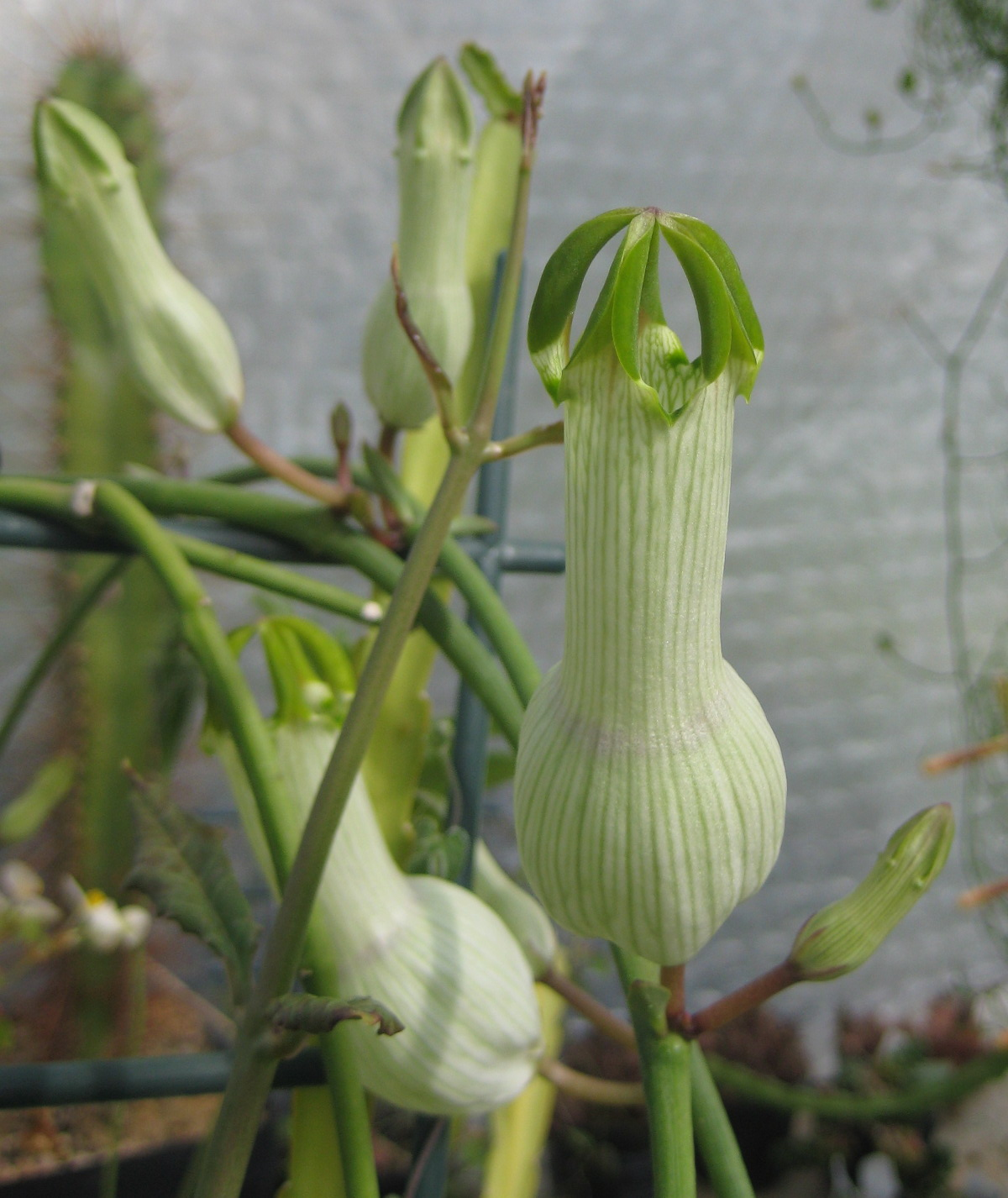
- Ceropegia ampliata in cultivation

Scientific classification
- Kingdom: Plantae
- Clade: Embryophytes
- Clade: Tracheophytes
- Clade: Spermatophytes
- Clade: Angiosperms
- Clade: Eudicots
- Clade: Asterids
- Order: Gentianales
- Family: Apocynaceae
- Genus: Ceropegia
- Species: C. ampliata

Binomial name
- Ceropegia ampliata E.Mey.

= Ceropegia ampliata =

Species of plant

Ceropegia ampliata is a flowering plant in the dogbane family Apocynaceae. It is native to eastern and southern Africa, including Kenya, Tanzania, Mozambique, South Africa, Eswatini, Botswana, and Madagascar. Common names include bushman's pipe, condom plant, and horny wonder.

== Description ==
Ceropegia ampliata is a trailing plant with a succulent stem and reduced leaves. The leaves may drop early, as the stem is the main photosynthetic organ, and it may form tuberous root structures. Like many Ceropegia, pollination occurs by trapping insects inside of flowers with stiff hairs until a pollenium is attached to the insect's leg or tongue through anther slits on the corona. Unlike other related species however, it is described as extremely generalist and is pollinated by flies from between four and seven fly families.

The flowers of this species are white and light green, occasionally with a light purple ring along the tube. The corolla tube can be curved or straight, with an inflation at the base, and can grow up to 50-70 mm long. They often flower between December and March in their natural habitat. After the fruit follicles dry out and split, the tufted seeds are dispersed by wind.
