= Ceropegia arenaria =

Conservation status
- Endangered (SANBI Red List)

Scientific classification
- Kingdom: Plantae
- Clade: Tracheophytes
- Clade: Angiosperms
- Clade: Eudicots
- Clade: Asterids
- Order: Gentianales
- Family: Apocynaceae
- Genus: Ceropegia
- Species: C. arenaria

Binomial name
- Ceropegia arenaria R.A.Dyer

Endangered species of South African plant

Ceropegia arenaria is an endangered species of lantern flower in the milkweeds subfamily Asclepiadoideae. It is endemic to a small portion of KwaZulu-Natal in South Africa.

== Habitat ==
Ceropegia arenaria is found in coastal dune forest habitat, in sandy soils of the Maputaland coastal forest mosaic ecoregion.

== Conservation status ==
Ceropegia arenaria has been classified as endangered due to it being known from only 5 collections, with a restricted range of 115km^{2}. The coastal forests in which it occurs in is also threatened by deforestation and fires as a result of wood harvesting and increased grazing areas for livestock such as cattle.
