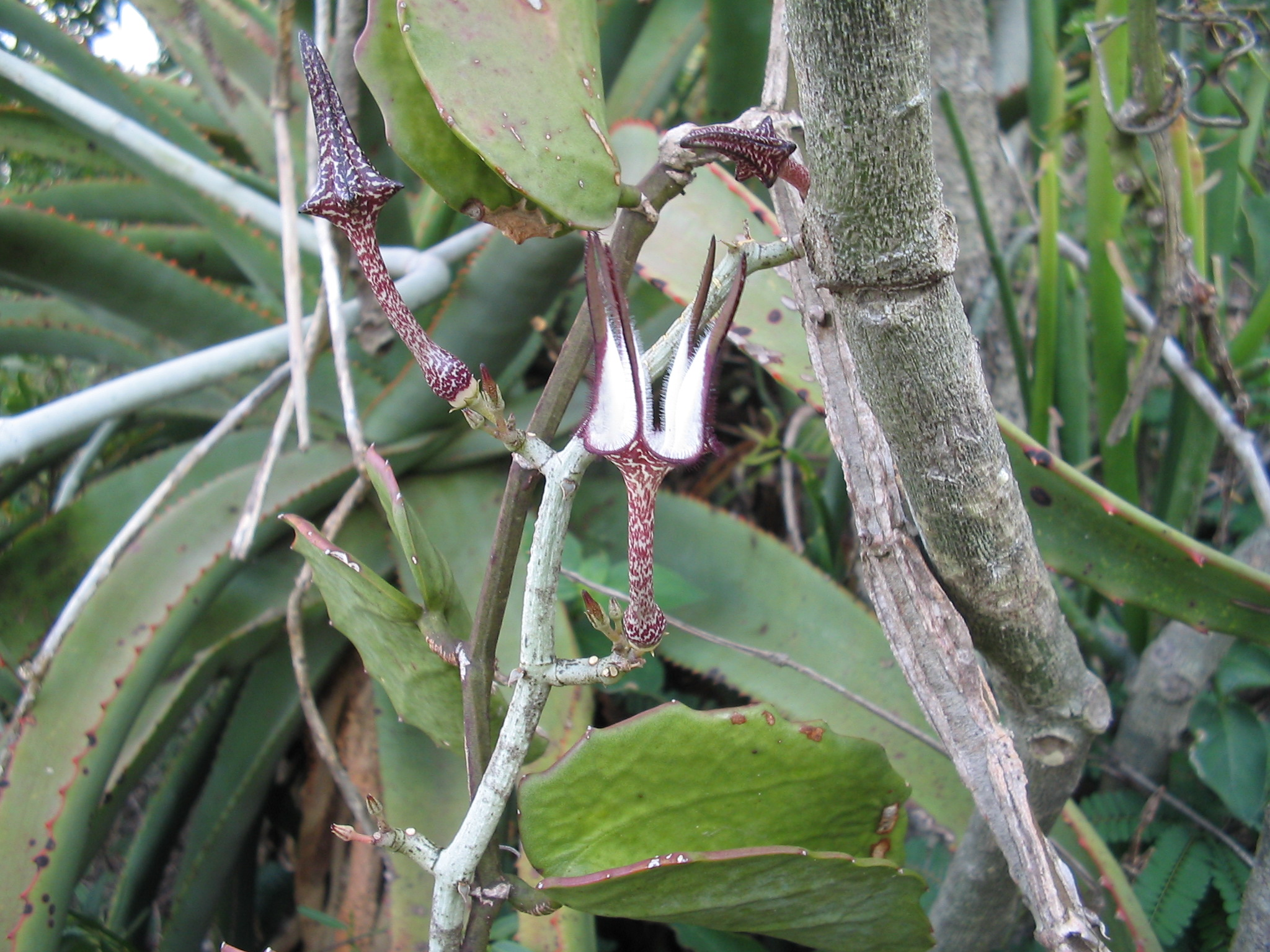
- Ceropegia stapeliiformis subsp. serpentina in the wild, Ingwavuma, South Africa

Scientific classification
- Kingdom: Plantae
- Clade: Tracheophytes
- Clade: Angiosperms
- Clade: Eudicots
- Clade: Asterids
- Order: Gentianales
- Family: Apocynaceae
- Genus: Ceropegia
- Species: C. stapeliiformis

Binomial name
- Ceropegia stapeliiformis Haw.

= Ceropegia stapeliiformis =

Species of plant

Ceropegia stapeliiformis is a flowering plant in the genus Ceropegia (Apocynaceae), native to South Africa and Eswatini. Common names include serpent ceropegia, snake creeper, and slangkambro.

Ceropegia stapeliiformis is a prostrate, creeping, trailing or climbing succulent creeper with fibrous roots (which develop where the warty, trailing stems touch the ground) and has clear sap. The leaves are minute and rudimentary, soon falling off the stems. The flowers are 5–7 cm long and have a distinctive funnel or flask-shape, which create a pitfall in which pollinators may be temporarily trapped. The stapeliiformis has a greenish white colour that is spotted or streaked with maroon. The petals surrounding the mouth are free-spreading, reflexed and fringed with hairs. The fruit a follicle with tubercles. This species is usually found rooted in leaf mould under the protection of shrubs.

Two subspecies have been described:

- Ceropegia stapeliiformis subsp. stapeliiformis
- Ceropegia stapeliiformis subsp. serpentina (E.A.Bruce) R.A.Dyer

The subspecies stapeliiformis is known from areas of karroid scrub in the Eastern Cape province of South Africa, with a distribution from Uitenhage and Willowmore to Graaff Reinet and King William's Town. This subspecies is known to flower from October to March.

The subspecies serpentina, which was initially described as Ceropegia serpentina by E. A. Bruce, has a distribution which ranges from Northern KwaZulu-Natal and Eswatini to Gauteng, Mpumalanga and Limpopo provinces of South Africa, where it occurs in scrub bush. The flowering time from December to March.

The names have the derivations stapeliiformis = resembling Stapelia (Latin), and serpentina = serpentine (Latin).
