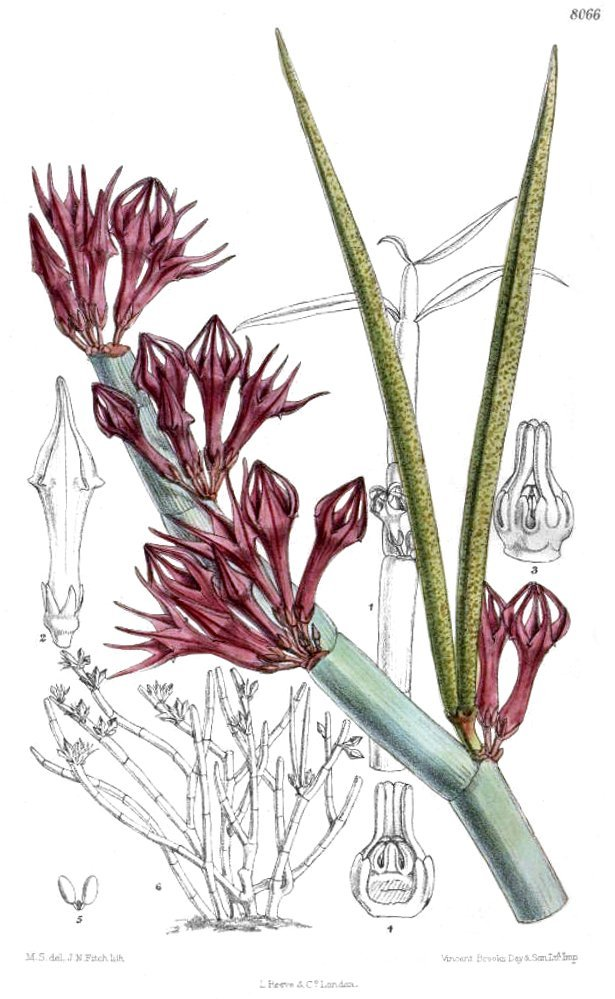
- Illustration of Ceropegia fusca

Scientific classification
- Kingdom: Plantae
- Clade: Tracheophytes
- Clade: Angiosperms
- Clade: Eudicots
- Clade: Asterids
- Order: Gentianales
- Family: Apocynaceae
- Genus: Ceropegia
- Species: C. fusca

Binomial name
- Ceropegia fusca Bolle

= Ceropegia fusca =

Species of plant

Ceropegia fusca is a flowering plant in the genus Ceropegia (Apocynaceae). It is endemic to the Canary Islands, where it grows on Tenerife (especially the Macizo de Anaga area), Gran Canaria, and La Palma in the Tabaibal-Cardonal zone at up to about 600 m altitude.

== Description ==
Ceropegia fusca forms erect woody stems reaching to 1.5 m tall. The leaves are deciduous, arranged in opposite pairs, each leaf narrow, 5 cm long. The flowers are produced in clusters of two to five in the leaf axils; they are tubular, reddish brown, with five narrow lobes joined at the tip; flowering is in spring to summer. The fruit is a pair of large capsules up to 10 cm long.

== Cultivation ==
Ceropegia fusca is used as an ornamental plant in dry and drought tolerant water conserving gardens. It requires hot conditions to grow well.

== References and external links ==
- Pérez, M. Á. C. (1999). Native Flora of the Canary Islands. Everest, León. ISBN 84-241-3555-5.
- Sightings of Ceropegia fusca
