= Ceropegia =

- Ceropegia distincta var. haygarthii

Scientific classification
- Kingdom: Plantae
- Clade: Tracheophytes
- Clade: Angiosperms
- Clade: Eudicots
- Clade: Asterids
- Order: Gentianales
- Family: Apocynaceae
- Subfamily: Asclepiadoideae
- Tribe: Ceropegieae
- Genus: Ceropegia; L. (1753)

Synonyms
- Apegia Neck. (1790), opus utique oppr.; Aulostephanus Schltr. (1896); Blepharanthera Schltr. (1913); Brachystelma R.Br. (1822); Brachystelmaria Schltr. (1895); Cinclia Hoffmanns. (1833); Craterostemma K.Schum. (1893); Decaceras Harv. (1863); Dichaelia Harv. (1868); Eriopetalum Wight (1834); Kinepetalum Schltr. (1913); Lasiostelma Benth. (1876); Macropetalum Burch. ex Decne. (1844); Micraster Harv. (1868); Microstemma R.Br. (1810), nom. rej.; Niota Adans. (1763); Siphonostelma Schltr. (1913); Systrepha Burch. (1822); Tapeinostelma Schltr. (1893); Tenaris E.Mey. (1838)

Genus of plants

Ceropegia is a genus of plants within the family Apocynaceae, native to Africa, southern Asia, and Australia. It was named by Carl Linnaeus, who first described this genus in his Genera plantarum, which appeared in 1737. Linnaeus referred to the description and picture of a plant in the Hortus Malabaricus as the plant for which the genus was created. In 1753 he named this species as Ceropegia candelabrum. Linnaeus did not explain the etymology but later explanations stated that the name Ceropegia was from the Greek word keropegion κηροπηγɩον. This means candelabrum in Latin, which has a broader range than the modern word - "a candlestick, a branched candlestick, a chandelier, candelabrum, or also lamp-stand, light-stand, sometimes of exquisite workmanship".

An alternative explanation for the name was given later by William Jackson Hooker in 1830 in Curtis's Botanical Magazine in the description of Ceropegia elegans: "From κηρός, wax, and πηγή, a fountain, in allusion to the delicate, waxy umbels of some species". However, four years later Hooker gave the etymology in the description in the same periodical of Ceropegia lushii as "remarkable for the peculiar shape of its flowers, frequently arranged in umbels, hence its name κηροπηγɩον, a candelabrum, or lamp-stand".

They have many common names including lantern flower, parasol flower, parachute flower, bushman's pipe, string of hearts, snake creeper, wine-glass vine, rosary vine, and necklace vine.

Ceropegia species are traded, kept, and propagated as ornamental plants. In Africa, the roots and leaves of some species are eaten raw and the tubers in India are eaten raw or stewed in curries.

== Appearance ==
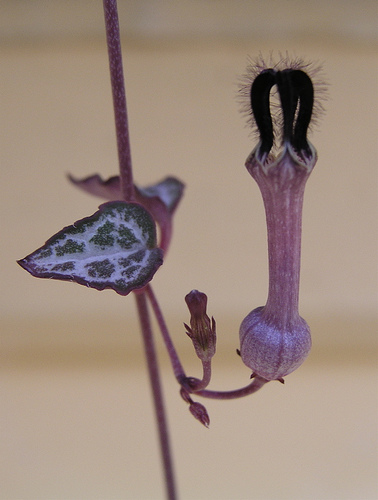
Ceropegia woodii

The stems are vining or trailing in most species, though a few species from the Canary Islands have erect growth habits. Among some species, such as Ceropegia woodii, the nodes swell, and the roots similarly expand to form tubers beneath the soil surface. The leaves are simple and opposite, although they can be rudimentary or absent. Especially in certain succulent species, the leaves may also be thick and fleshy.

The flowers have a tubular corolla with five petals most often fused at the tips, forming an umbrella-like canopy, a cage, or appendage-like antennae. Pollination is accomplished by flies, and species can be generalists by attracting multiple families, or extremely specialized. Ceropegia dolichophylla releases scents that attract kleptoparasitic flies by mimicking the pheromones released by predatory arthropods in distress. The flowers are often inflated and fused at several points, forming a cage. Flies become momentarily trapped inside, accomplishing pollination as they move about.

== Classification ==
The genus Ceropegia belongs to the subfamily Asclepiadoideae (milkweeds) within the family Apocynaceae. Species of this genus bear similarities to the carrion flowers or stapelias. There are at least 420 known species. More are being discovered and described regularly. They are distributed throughout most of sub-Saharan Africa and Madagascar to the Arabian Peninsula, southeast Asia, the Canary Islands, the tropical Pacific, and Australia.

A generic complex, with many interesting taxonomic problems at both generic and specific level, is formed by three genera: Ceropegia, Brachystelma and Riocreuxia.

== Selected species ==
Over 450 species are accepted. Selected species include:

- Ceropegia africana (South Africa)
- Ceropegia ampliata (South Africa)
- Ceropegia anjanerica (Western Ghats, India)
- Ceropegia antennifera (South Africa)
- Ceropegia arabica (Arabia)
- Ceropegia arenaria
- Ceropegia aridicola (China)
- Ceropegia aristolochoides (Senegal to Ethiopia)
- Ceropegia armandii (Madagascar)
- Ceropegia ballyana (Kenya)
- Ceropegia barbarta (South Africa)
- Ceropegia barkleyi (South Africa)
- Ceropegia bonafouxii (Namibia)
- Ceropegia bosseri (Madagascar)
- Ceropegia cancellata (South Africa)
- Ceropegia candelabrum (Asia)
- Ceropegia carnosa (South Africa)
- Ceropegia ceratophora (Canary Islands)
- Ceropegia chrysantha (Canary Islands)
- Ceropegia cimiciodora (South Africa)
- Ceropegia crassifolia (southern Africa)
- Ceropegia debilis
- Ceropegia decidua (eastern Africa)
- Ceropegia denticulata (tropical Africa)
- Ceropegia devecchii (eastern Africa)
- Ceropegia dichotoma (Canary Islands)
- Ceropegia dimorpha (Madagascar)
- Ceropegia dinteri (Namibia)
- Ceropegia distincta (Zanzibar)
- Ceropegia elegans
- Ceropegia filiformis (South Africa)
- Ceropegia fimbriata (South Africa)
- Ceropegia fusca (Canary Islands)
- Ceropegia galeata (Kenya)
- Ceropegia gemmifera - Togo tangle
- Ceropegia haygarthii (South Africa)
- Ceropegia hians (Canary Islands)
- Ceropegia intermedia (India)
- Ceropegia beddomei (Western Ghats, India)
- Ceropegia jainii (Western Ghats, India)
- Ceropegia juncea (Coast of Coromandel, India)
- Ceropegia krainzii (Canary Islands)
- Ceropegia leroyi (Madagascar)
- Ceropegia linearis (South Africa)
- Ceropegia lugardae (eastern Africa)
- Ceropegia mohanramii (India)
- Ceropegia multiflora (southern Africa)
- Ceropegia nilotica (eastern Africa)
- Ceropegia pusilla (India)
- Ceropegia pachystelma (southern Africa)
- Ceropegia petignatii (Madagascar)
- Ceropegia racemosa (tropical Africa)
- Ceropegia radicans (South Africa)
- Ceropegia rendallii (South Africa)
- Ceropegia robynsiana (Congo)
- Ceropegia rupicola (Arabia)
- Ceropegia sandersonii (southern Africa)
- Ceropegia schinziata Bruyns (Namibia and Zimbabwe)
- Ceropegia schultzei (Schltr.) Bruyns (Botswana and Namibia)
- Ceropegia senegalensis (Senegal)
- Ceropegia seticorona (eastern Africa)
- Ceropegia simoneae (Madagascar)
- Ceropegia somaliensis (eastern Africa)
- Ceropegia stapeliiformis (South Africa)
- Ceropegia stentii (South Africa)
- Ceropegia striata (Madagascar)
- Ceropegia succulenta
- Ceropegia superba (Arabia)
- Ceropegia turricula (South Africa)
- Ceropegia variegata (Arabia)
- Ceropegia verrucosa
- Ceropegia vincifolia (Western Ghats, India)
- Ceropegia viridis (Madagascar)
- Ceropegia woodii - string of hearts
- Ceropegia zeyheri (South Africa)

== Gallery ==
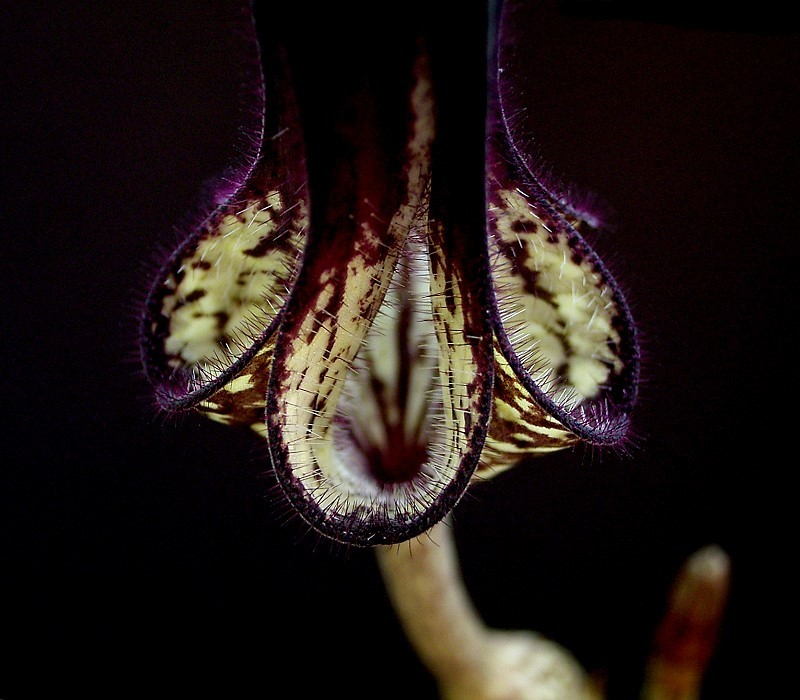
Ceropegia stapeliiformis

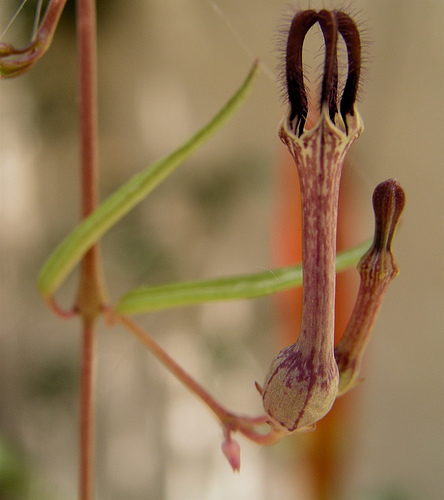
Ceropegia linearis

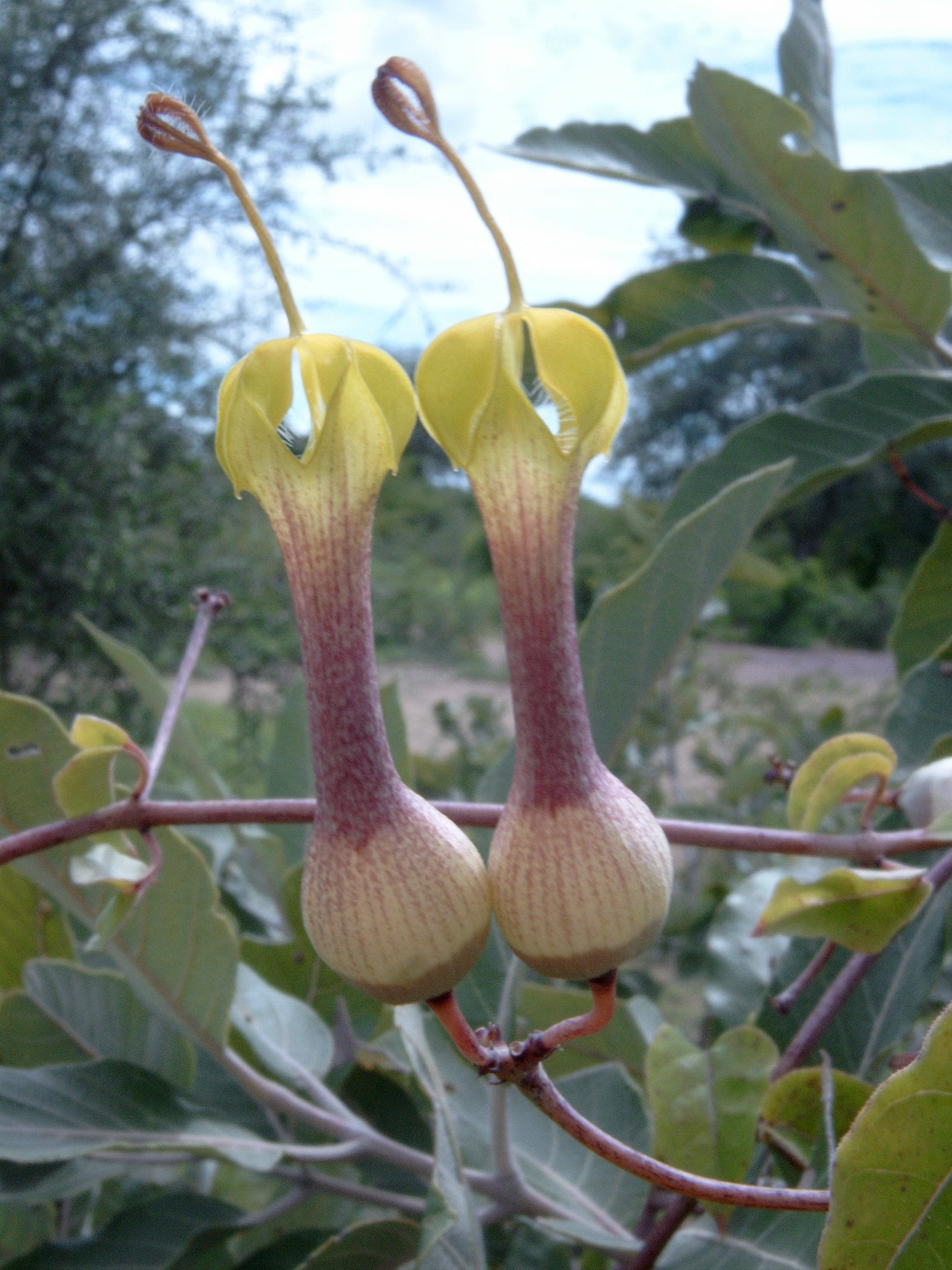
Ceropegia rhynchantha

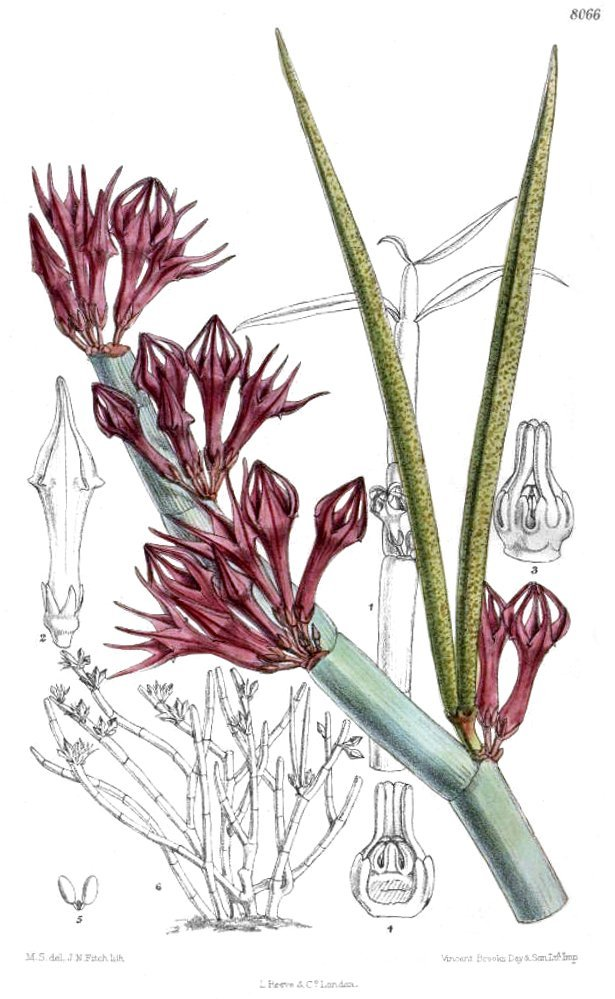
Ceropegia fusca

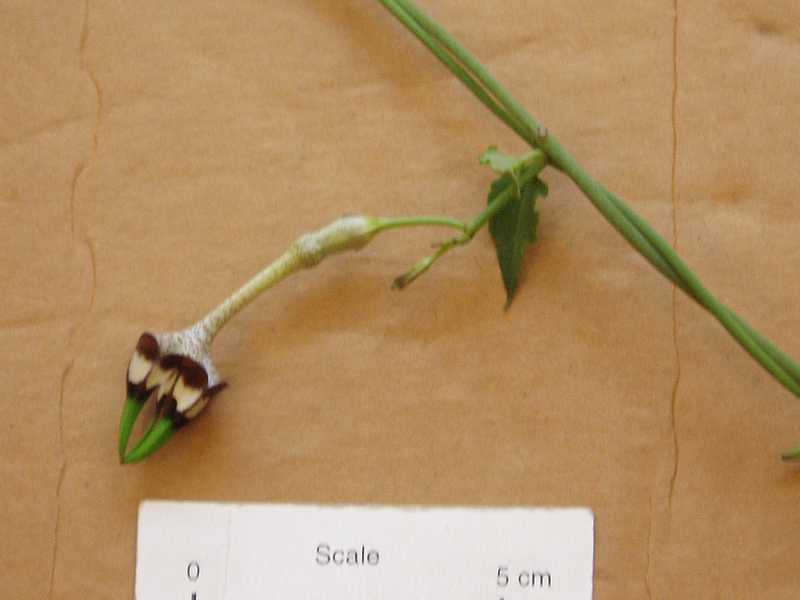
Ceropegia radicans ssp. radicans
