= Hill Dickinson =

British international commercial law firm

Hill Dickinson LLP
- Headquarters: Liverpool
- No. of offices: 11
- No. of employees: 1000
- Major practice areas: General practice
- Key people: Craig Scott (Chief Executive), Jonathan Brown (Chairman)
- Revenue: £145.5 million turnover (2024)
- Date founded: 1810 (Liverpool)
- Company type: Limited liability partnership
- Website: hilldickinson.com

Hill Dickinson is a British international commercial law firm headquartered in Liverpool, United Kingdom.

== History ==
Hill Dickinson's origins can be traced back to 1810, with the establishment of a Liverpool legal practice by the firm's founder, Edward Morrall. John Edward Gray Hill joined the firm in 1865. John Dickinson (1847–1907) became a partner in 1872, and the firm traded as Duncan, Hill & Dickinson. It established itself as a leading maritime law office, and represented the White Star Line in connection with the sinking of the RMS Titanic and Cunard Line in respect of the sinking of RMS Lusitania which was torpedoed by a German U-boat on 7 May 1915.

In 1927 Edith Berthen joined the firm as one of the first women in England and Wales to qualify as a solicitor. In 1931 one of the firm's solicitors, Hector Munro, represented William Herbert Wallace in connection with his trial and subsequent appeal against his conviction for the murder of his wife Julia in their home in Wolverton Street in Liverpool's Anfield district. His conviction was later overturned by the Court of Criminal Appeal, the first instance in British legal history where an appeal had been allowed after re-examination of evidence (see R v Wallace).

Partner William Goffey (known as WG) started his career in 1901 at Hill Dickinson's 10 Water Street office. He became senior partner in 1950 and continued to practice until shortly before his death in 1979 at the age of 94. As the son of a ship owning family who operated sailing barques from Liverpool under the name Goffey & Co, much of his practice was Admiralty and related work.

In the Black Solicitors Network's Diversity League Table 2009 Hill Dickinson was ranked 30th within the top 100 UK law firms. In January 2010, the firm was ranked as the sixth most female friendly firm (among the top 50 UK firms by turnover) with 27 per cent of its partnership made up of women. In 2016 Hill Dickinson won the Golden Turd Award from roll on Friday, an award voted for by its employees about their experience working for the company.

In 2025, Hill Dickinson became title sponsors of Everton FC's new stadium at Bramley-Moore Dock.

== Offices ==
Hill Dickinson operates from seven UK offices and four overseas offices. The firm's headquarters are in Liverpool at No. 1 St Paul's Square. Other UK locations are Manchester, Leeds and a new Newcastle office (opened in 2022) and Birmingham (opened in 2024) and two offices in London; The Broadgate Tower and in Knightsbridge. Overseas locations are Singapore, Greece, Monaco and Hong Kong.

== See also ==
- List of largest UK law firms
