= National Botanic Garden of Israel =

Coordinates: 31°47′37.06″N 35°14′39.11″E

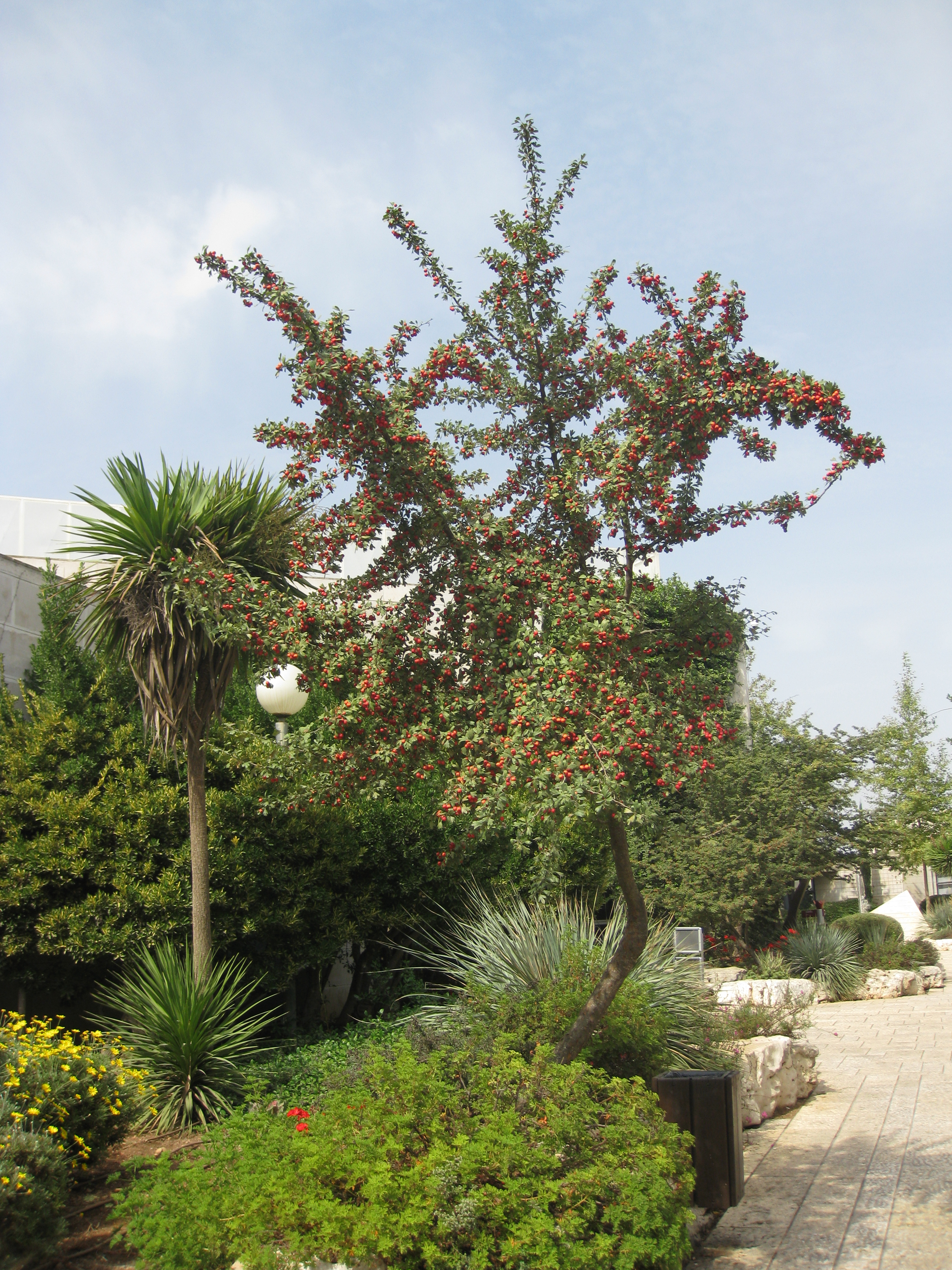
- Interactive map of National Botanic Garden of Israel
- Location: Mount Scopus, Jerusalem
- Created: 1931
- Operator: Hebrew University of Jerusalem
- Status: Open all year
- Website: botanic-garden.huji.ac.il/eng_index.htm

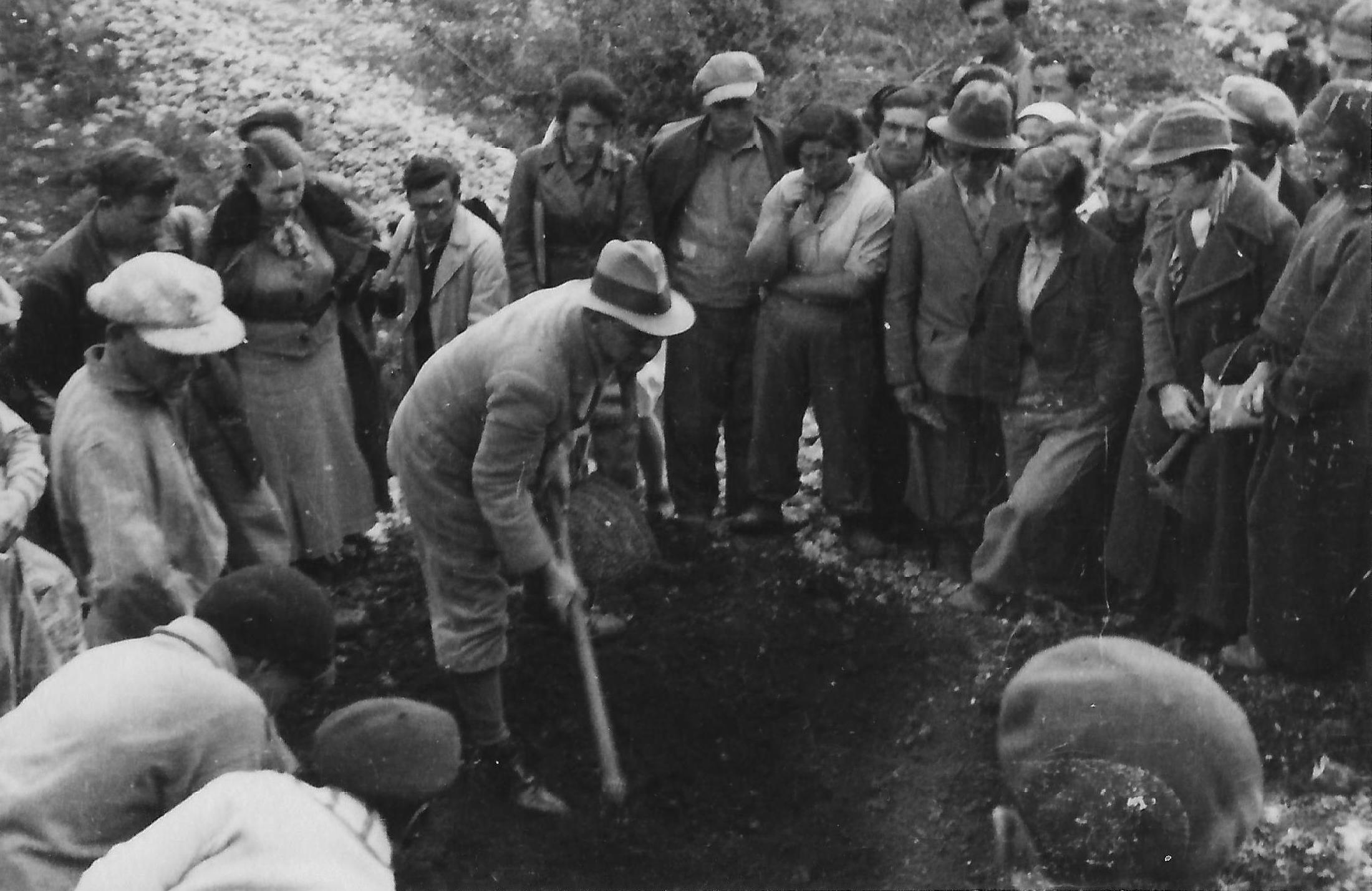
Botanist Alexander Eig planting the first tree in the garden – 1931

National Botanic Garden of Israel (officially Montague Lamport Botanical Garden for the Native Plants of Israel) Hebrew: הגן הבוטני לצמחי ארץ ישראל ע"ש מונטג'יו למפורט), is a botanical garden located on the Mount Scopus campus of the Hebrew University of Jerusalem. Its herbarium and Institution Code is HUJ. It covers an area of 25 dunams and contains 950 varieties of plants, 40% of them wild.

== Overview ==
The first botanical garden in the Land of Israel, it records all the wild plants of Israel and the Middle East. The garden is located in the northern part of the Hebrew University campus on Mount Scopus in Jerusalem. Around the garden are many burial caves from the Second Temple period. In the western part of the garden is a small amphitheater. The garden is also an Ecological nature reserve and National park. It incorporates a Natural Teaching Center, the largest botanical library in Israel and a meteorological station. On the western side of the garden is trail walk named after the Israeli author Avigdor Hameiri. In the center of the trail, next to the main entrance, is a stone tablet inscribed with his famous song poem "On the summit of Mount Scopus."

== History ==
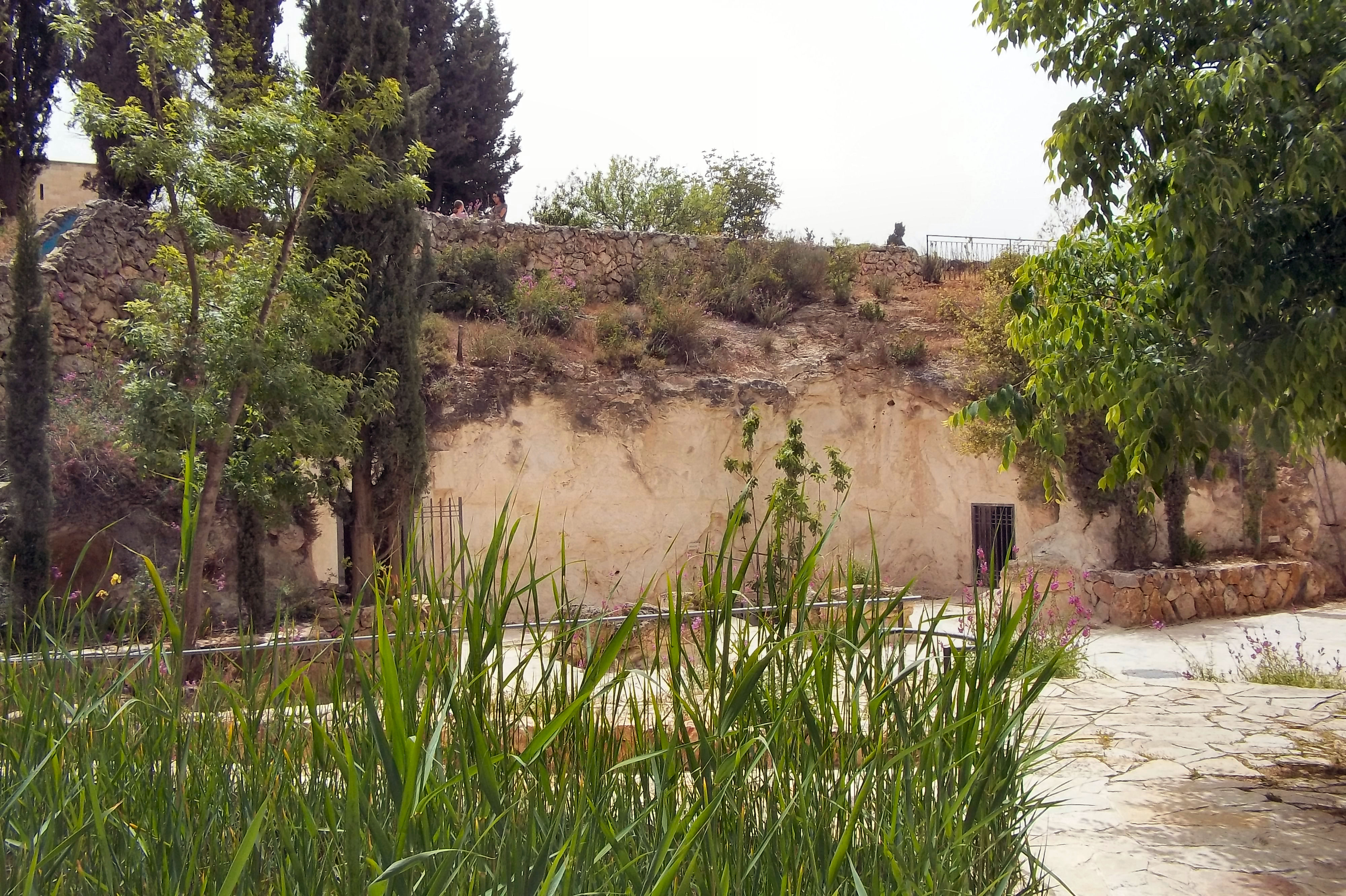
Cave of Nicanor

The garden was established in 1931 on the northern side of the Hebrew University on Mount Scopus by Otto Warburg, who founded the university's Department of Botany together botanist Alexander Eig. It was the first botanical garden in the Land of Israel. The garden was a highlight of the scientific and educational work of botanist Alexander Eig who continued to teach at the university until his death. He planted the first tree in the garden. He established a program to protect the local flora. He collected plants in Syria, Turkey, Iraq and Lebanon, brought seedlings from 350 Cedrus.

The garden was the first home of the Jerusalem Biblical Zoo. The Mt. Scopus period lasted from 1947 to 1950. In 1948, when there was no food in Jerusalem, zookeepers had to hunt stray dogs near garbage dumps to feed the carnivorous animals, many of which perished. Non-dangerous species had to be released. In 1950, with UN help, the animals were moved down into the city by weekly convoys.

The garden was neglected for 19 years, when the Mount Scopus campus was in an enclave under Israeli control surrounded by Jordan. In 1954, the Jerusalem Botanical Gardens opened in western Jerusalem on the new campus of the Hebrew University in Givat Ram, near the Jewish National and University Library. In 1958 two Israelis soldiers were killed in the garden by Jordanian ambush, also the "United States Chairman of the Commission" that came to mediate was killed in this incident.

In 1980, work began to renew the garden, which reopened in 1988.It is the first in the world to be recognized as an "ecological garden," designed for nature conservation. Many of the species are very rare or non-existent in the wild.

== Burial caves ==
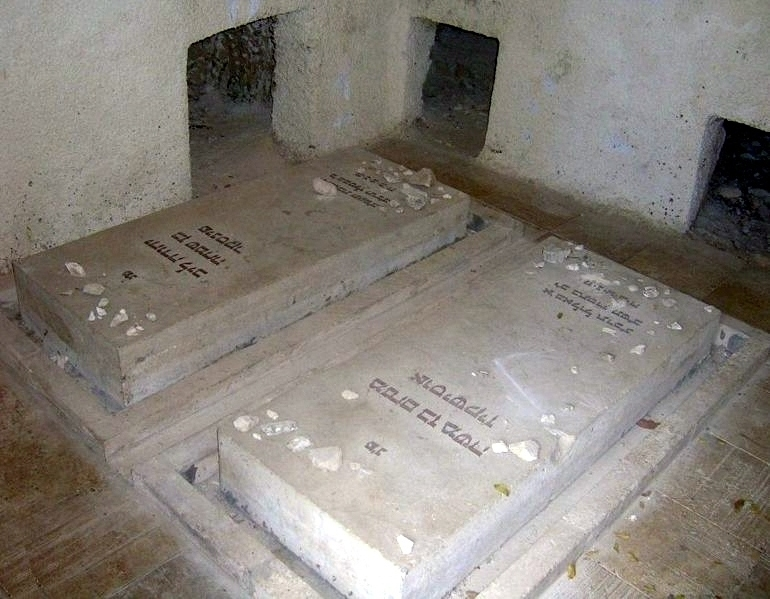
Graves of Leon Pinsker and Menachem Ussishkin

The Cave of Nicanor is an ancient burial cave from the Second Temple period discovered in 1902. An inscription marked it as the grave of "Nicanor" who built the doors on the First Temple in Jerusalem. In 1934, the remains of Leon Pinsker from Odessa were reburied in the Nicanor cave at the initiative of Menachem Ussishkin, who envisaged a national pantheon on Mt. Scopus. However, the only other person buried there was Ussishkin himself, who died in 1941. A national leaders plot was established on Mount Herzl after the founding of the state in 1948, in part because Mount Scopus became an enclave in Jordanian-ruled territory.

== See also ==
- List of botanical gardens in Israel
- List of endemic flora of Israel
- Wildlife of Israel
