= John Edward Gray Hill =

British solicitor and travel writer (1839–1914)

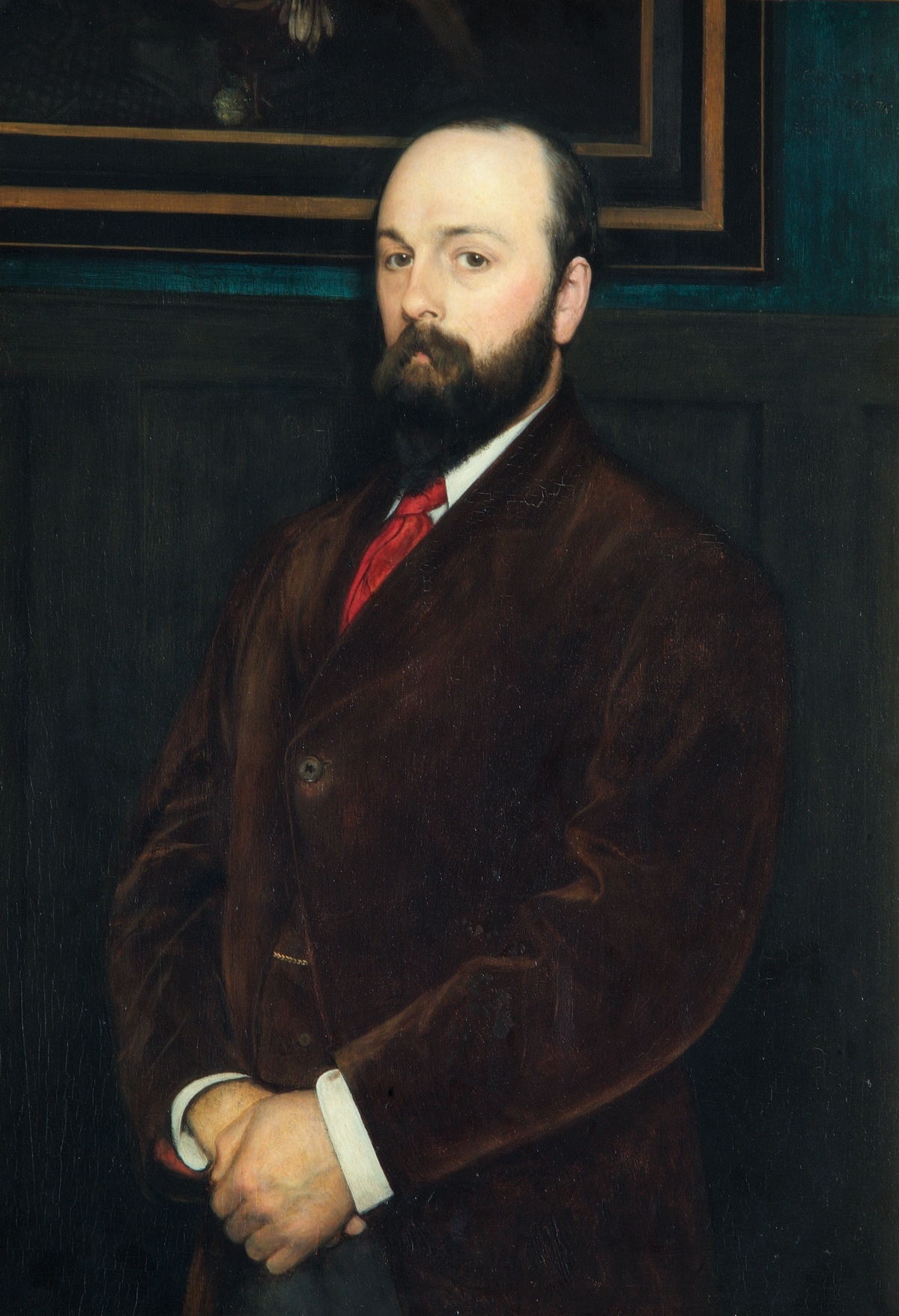
John Edward Gray Hill, 1874 portrait

Sir John Edward Gray Hill (1839–1914) was an English solicitor specialised in maritime law. He was also known as an art collector and travel writer.

== Life ==
He was son of Arthur Hill of Tottenham, born there on 18 September 1839. His father was headmaster of Bruce Castle School, where he was educated. His mother was Ellen Tilt Maurice. Lewin Hill and George Birkbeck Norman Hill were his brothers. His uncle was postal reformer Rowland Hill.

Hill, who in later life also used the surname Gray-Hill, entered the legal profession. He took his articles with Gregory, Rowcliffes & Co. of London, and was admitted a solicitor in 1863. He joined the Liverpool law firm that was later known as Hill Dickinson in 1864, and became its senior partner, when it traded as Hill, Dickinson, Dickinson, Hill & Roberts of Water Street. In 1868, he replaced Andrew Tucker Squarey as secretary of the Liverpool Steamship Owners' Association, a position he held for 40 years. He was also the secretary of the North Atlantic Steam Traffic Conference, another grouping of shipowners, and sought to defend the British merchant navy from international marine courts being established that were under US influence.

Involved with both the International Law Society and the International Maritime Committee, Hill supported the Liberal Unionists from the mid-1880s while in politics. A Unionist associate, in strongly Home Ruler Liverpool, was James Willcox Alsop (1846–1921), another leading solicitor. Hill held a number of directorships in insurance companies. In 1903, he became the President of the Law Society of England and Wales, and in 1904 he was knighted.

At the end of his life, Hill took an interest in Jewish settlement in Palestine. The Zionist campaigner Solomon Alfred Adler, son of Hermann Adler, who died in 1910, was active in Liverpool. Hill made a speech "The Jews of Jerusalem" at the opening of the Palestine Exhibition in Liverpool in 1912, and talked on "Zionism, Jerusalem and the Holy Land" to the Liverpool Jewish Literary Society in 1913. At the end of 1913, he contradicted the views of John Walter Gregory on the aridity of Palestine.

== Residences and collection ==
Mere Hall, Oxton, Birkenhead was built for Hill by Edmund Kirby, around 1880. Now it is a Grade II listed building, divided into flats. From the mid-1880s, his art collection was housed there: it was reviewed in The Athenaeum in 1886, which noted works by Thomas Gainsborough, Joshua Reynolds and George Romney. He resided at 1, Mitre Court Buildings, in the Temple, London.

A patron of the arts, Hill supported Edward Robert Hughes, and bought works of Liverpool artists including the marine painter William Joseph Julius Caesar Bond.

Hill owned a house and land near Jerusalem, and land in Eastern Palestine. Travelling annually to Palestine from 1887, he bought land there from 1889. He later built a house on it, for his painter wife Caroline, at a location on the Jerusalem–'Anata road: it was described in handbooks as "Mr Gray-Hill's villa". The Gray Hills gave its address as Ras Ab(o)u Kharoub. The cave of Nicanor was discovered near the house at the beginning of the 20th century.

== Death and the Mount Scopus estate ==
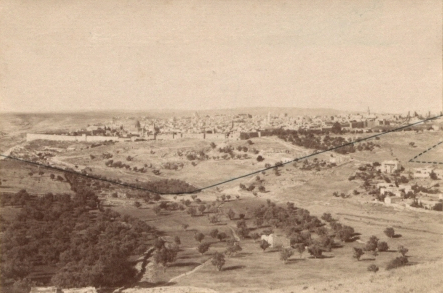
View in 1918 from near the Gray Hill house on Mount Scopus, towards the Old City, Jerusalem

Sir John Gray Hill died on 19 June 1914. He and his wife had been willing to sell the Mount Scopus estate since 1911, when he had become ill.

The estate was sold to a group who acted as founders of the Hebrew University of Jerusalem. The house on the estate has been identified as the probable source of an allusion in The Old New Land (1902) by Theodor Herzl. Norman Bentwich, biographer of Judah Leon Magnes, recounts how Magnes and his wife saw the house and garden and considered it suitable as a site for a university. Bentwich visited the Gray-Hills at their house in 1914, hearing Sir John's concerns about town planning and slums in Jerusalem.

There was, however, another site under consideration for the university, at Jabel Mukaber. It was only in 1913 that Menachem Sheinkin representing potential backers from Odessa reported to Menachem Ussishkin that the Mount Scopus site was preferable. Sheinkin was able to get in touch with Hill through Benjamin Ivri of Haifa, who knew the family. Vying between Zionist groups meant the Odessa money was not called upon.

The purchase of land on Mount Scopus was piecemeal and used funds from Isaac Leib Goldberg, and was carried out by Arthur Ruppin on behalf of the World Zionist Organization. Details were agreed with the Hill family in 1914, before World War I intervened, but the sale took effect in 1918, January 31 for the paid sum of £6,500.

== Travels and works ==
Hill travelled, especially in the region of Syria, and published With the Beduins (1891), illustrated by photographs taken by his wife. He visited the independent missionary to Transjordan William Lethaby (1837–1909) at Al-Karak, in 1890. In 1891 he visited Sahab. He wrote for the Palestine Exploration Fund journal about journeys east of the Jordan River (1895), and to Petra (1896).

In 1896 Hill first published on the site Qasr Al-Kharanah. He explored in 1897 the mouth of Wadi Mujib on the Dead Sea. Details of his travels, and of those of Louis-Hugues Vincent in the same areas, appeared in the Provincia Arabia (1904–1909, 3 vols.) of Rudolf Ernst Brünnow and Alfred von Domaszewski.

Hill's travels were restricted by local security issues, and he had to abandon plans to visit Qusayr 'Amra. An earlier journey to Petra, in 1890, had resulted in Hill and his wife being detained for ten days by Arabs asking for payment. Hill's successful Petra journey of 1896 was his fourth attempt. The Bedouin considered that more casual tourism in the area, which was being supported by the central government and plans for the Hejaz railway, threatened a traditional pattern of camel hire and pilgrim travel.

In 1903 Caroline Gray Hill published in The Windsor Magazine an article "A Journey by the Way of the Philistines", about a route starting in El Qantara, Egypt and passing through Arish and what is now the Gaza Strip, to Bethlehem. She related that this journey had been made twice with her husband, and once without him. The article is illustrated by her own paintings and photographs, and mentions their guide George Mabbedy.

== Family ==
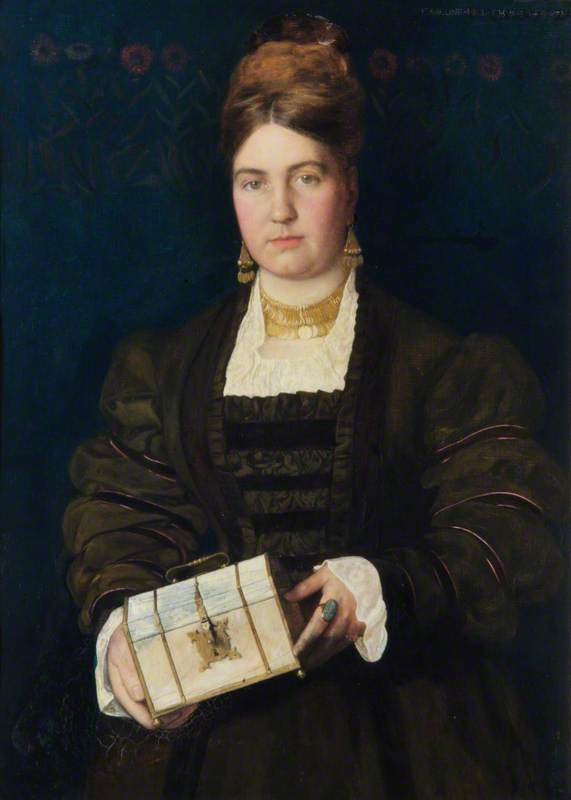
Caroline Emily Gray Hill

Hill married in 1864 Caroline Emily Hardy (1843–1924), daughter of George Drake Hardy of Tottenham. A painter known as Caroline Emily Gray Hill, or Lady Gray Hill, she had works—landscapes of Palestine—shown in a solo retrospective exhibition "The Lady and the Desert" at Ticho House in 2002.

The couple had no children. John's executor was Sir Norman Hill. He was the son of John's brother George Birkbeck Hill, and a solicitor of Hill, Dickinson & Co.
