= Caroline Emily Gray Hill =

Artist and photographer

Lady Caroline Emily Gray Hill
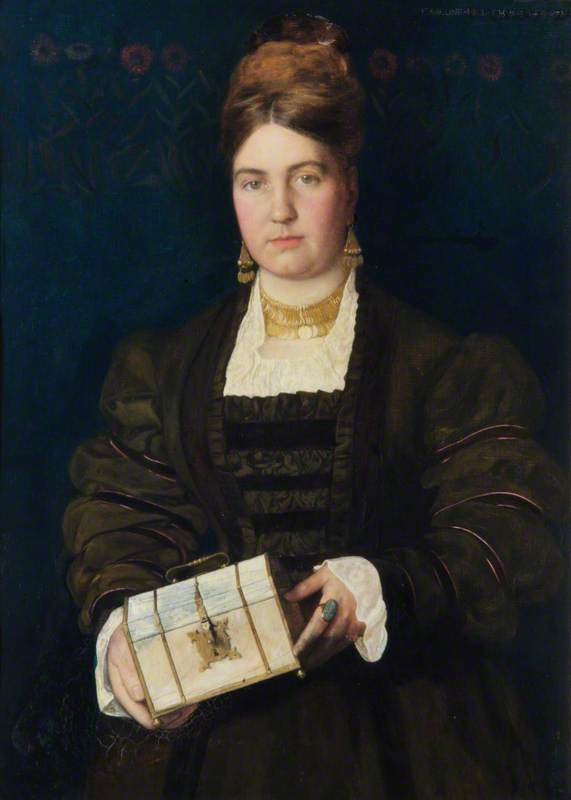
- Born: 14 August 1843; Tottenham
- Died: 1924 (aged 80–81)
- Partner: John Edward Gray Hill

Caroline Emily Gray Hill (14 August 1843 – 1924) was a British artist and photographer.

== Biography ==
Caroline Emily Gray Hill was born in Tottenham, the daughter of George Drake Hardy in 1843. She married the solicitor Sir John Edward Gray Hill. In 1888 they took their first trip, of many decades of travel, to the Holy Land. The couple lived on Mount Scopus, on the outskirts of Jerusalem, and Mere Hall in Birkenhead near Liverpool. They had no children. Hill died in 1924. Some of her works and papers are in the University of Liverpool archives.

== Art career ==
Hill's art was focused on the desert and she also took photographs which were used to illustrate the travel book, With the Beduins (1891), written by her husband.

In 1903 Hill wrote the article "A Journey by the Way of the Philistines" for The Windsor Magazine, detailing a route she had travelled both alone and with her husband. It began in El Qantara on the Suez Canal, crossing the Sinai through Arish, and on to Gaza and Bethlehem. Again her photos and paintings were used for illustration.

Her work was displayed in a solo retrospective exhibition "The Lady and the Desert" at Ticho House in Jerusalem in 2002. In Jerusalem's Church of St George there is a plaque to her memory.

== Legacy ==
In 1914, Arthur Ruppin, head of the Palestine Office of the Zionist Organization purchased the estate of Sir John Gray Hill for the purpose of building a university. As Ruppin wrote in his diary: “Today I succeeded in buying from Sir John Gray Hill his large and magnificently situated property on Mount Scopus, thus acquiring the first piece of ground for the Jewish university in Jerusalem.”
