= List of botanical gardens in Israel =

Botanical gardens in Israel have collections consisting entirely of Israel native and endemic species; most have a collection that include plants from around the world. There are botanical gardens and arboreta in all states and territories of Israel, most are administered by local governments, some are privately owned.

- Dead Sea Ein Gedi Botanic Garden
- Jerusalem Botanical Gardens, Jerusalem
- Tel Aviv University Botanical Garden Tel Aviv
- Arad Botanical Gardens
- Ben Gurion University of the Negev Beer Sheva
- Neot Kdomim Biblical Garden Ben Shemen
- Arboretum Dpt. of Natural Resources Beit Dagan
- Botanical Garden "Mikveh-Israel" Holon
- Jericho Botanical Garden Jericho
- Botanical Garden for Native Flora of Israel Jerusalem
- Ramat Hanadiv Memorial Gardens and Nature Park Zikhron Yaakov
