= Nayot =

Neighborhood in Jerusalem

Coordinates: 31°46′4.77″N 35°12′10.48″E

Nayot Hebrew: ניות
- Neighborhood of Jerusalem
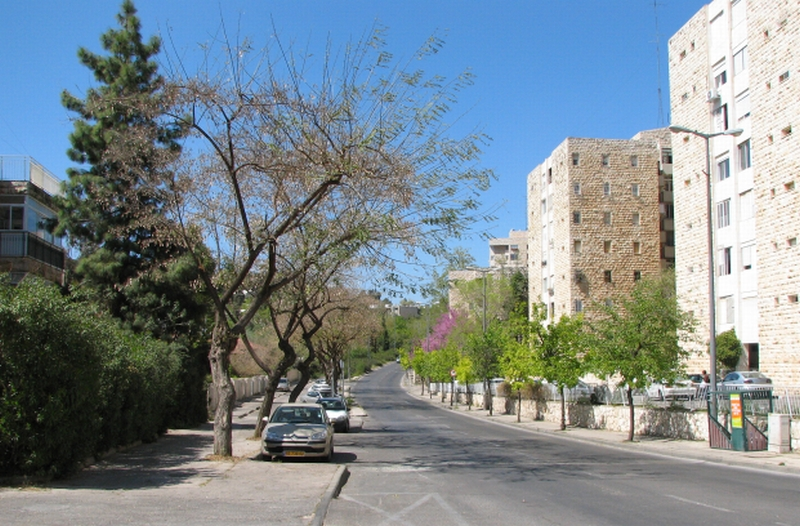
- Yehuda Burla Street, Nayot
- Interactive map of Nayot
- Country: Israel
- District: Jerusalem District
- City: Jerusalem
- Foundation: 1950s
- Founder: Jewish immigrants from English-speaking countries

Population (2024)
  - Total: 2,223

Nayot (Hebrew: נָיוֹת) is a neighborhood in south-central Jerusalem established in 1960 by a group of English-speaking immigrants. The neighborhood's population of 2,223 includes a mix of families, young children, and older adults. Its most notable landmark is likely the Jerusalem Botanical Gardens.

== Etymology ==
The name Nayot (lit. "oases") appears six times in the Bible, in I Samuel (I Samuel 19:18).

== History ==
Nayot was the first housing project in Jerusalem built by Anglo immigrants to Israel. Until an official name was announced in 1963, it was known as Hashikun Ha'anglo Saxi (the Anglo-Saxon neighborhood). English-speaking immigrants seeking housing in the 1950s formed a committee in 1957, and leased 16 dunams of land from the Jewish National Fund below the hill where the Israel Museum and the Knesset are located today, which was outside the boundaries of Jerusalem at the time.

Of the first 62 semi-detached homes built in 1960, fifty were purchased by families who immigrated to Israel from the United States and Canada. Many of the first tenants were diplomats, among them Simcha Dinitz. The architect was David Resnick, who won the Israel Prize for architecture in 1995.

The committee also set up a mortgage fund, which was unknown in Israel in those days. Fundraising in the United States brought in $100,000, and the Israeli government matched the sum, creating a fund of $200,000.

== Landmarks ==
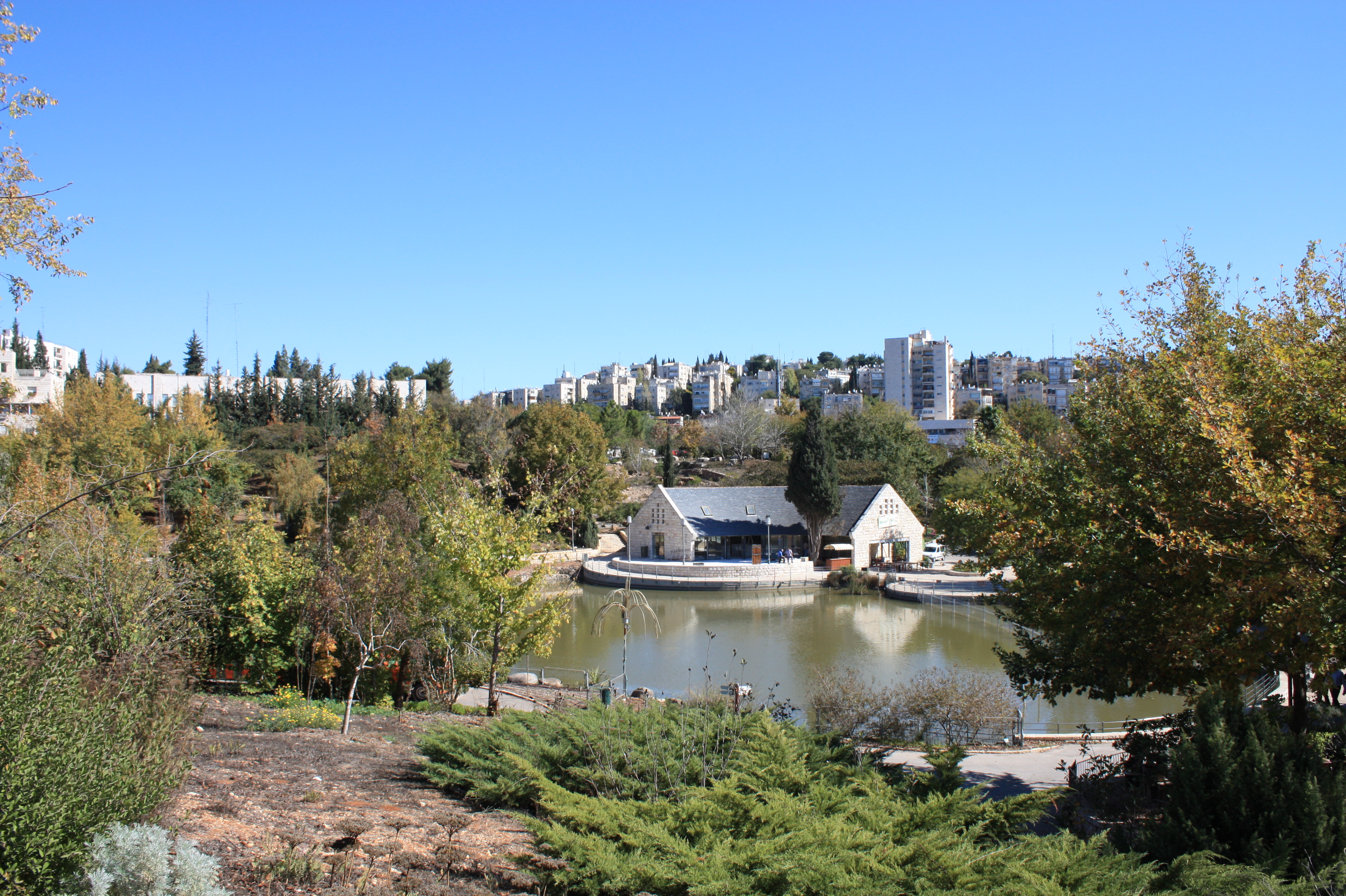
Located in Nayot, the Jerusalem Botanical Gardens are the largest botanical gardens in Israel, spanning 30 acres and showcasing over 6,000 plant species.

Nayot’s most famous landmark is the Jerusalem Botanical Gardens, located just off Herzog Street. Spanning 30 acres, it is the largest botanical garden in Israel. The garden serves as a center for education, learning, and research, featuring more than 6,000 plant species from around the world. It is divided into sections that showcase the flora of different regions, such as Southern Africa and the Mediterranean.

== Notable residents ==
- Shimon Agranat
- Eliyahu Lankin
