= Cave of Nicanor =

Burial cave in Jerusalem

Coordinates: 31°47′35.48″N 35°14′41.56″E

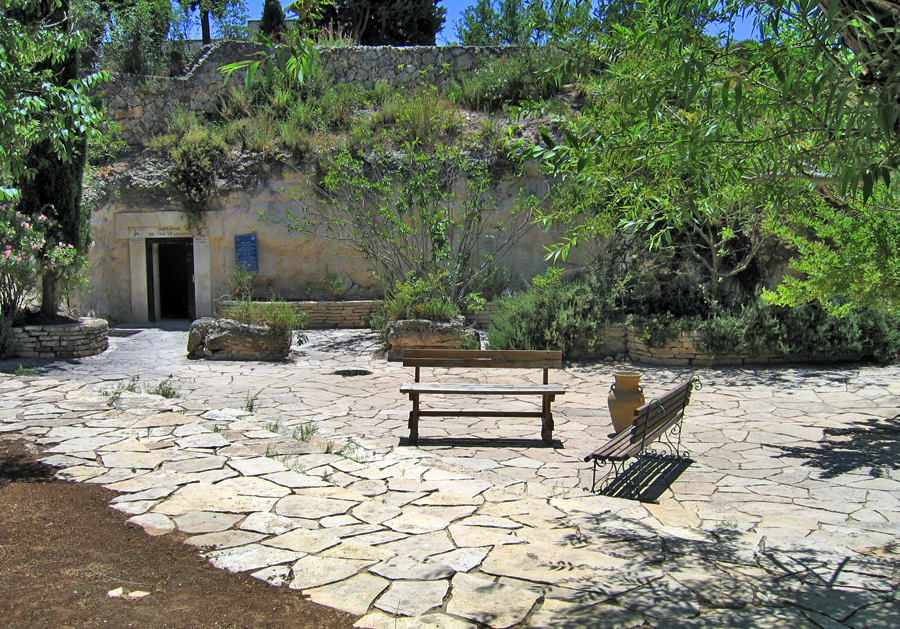
The entrance to the Pantheon

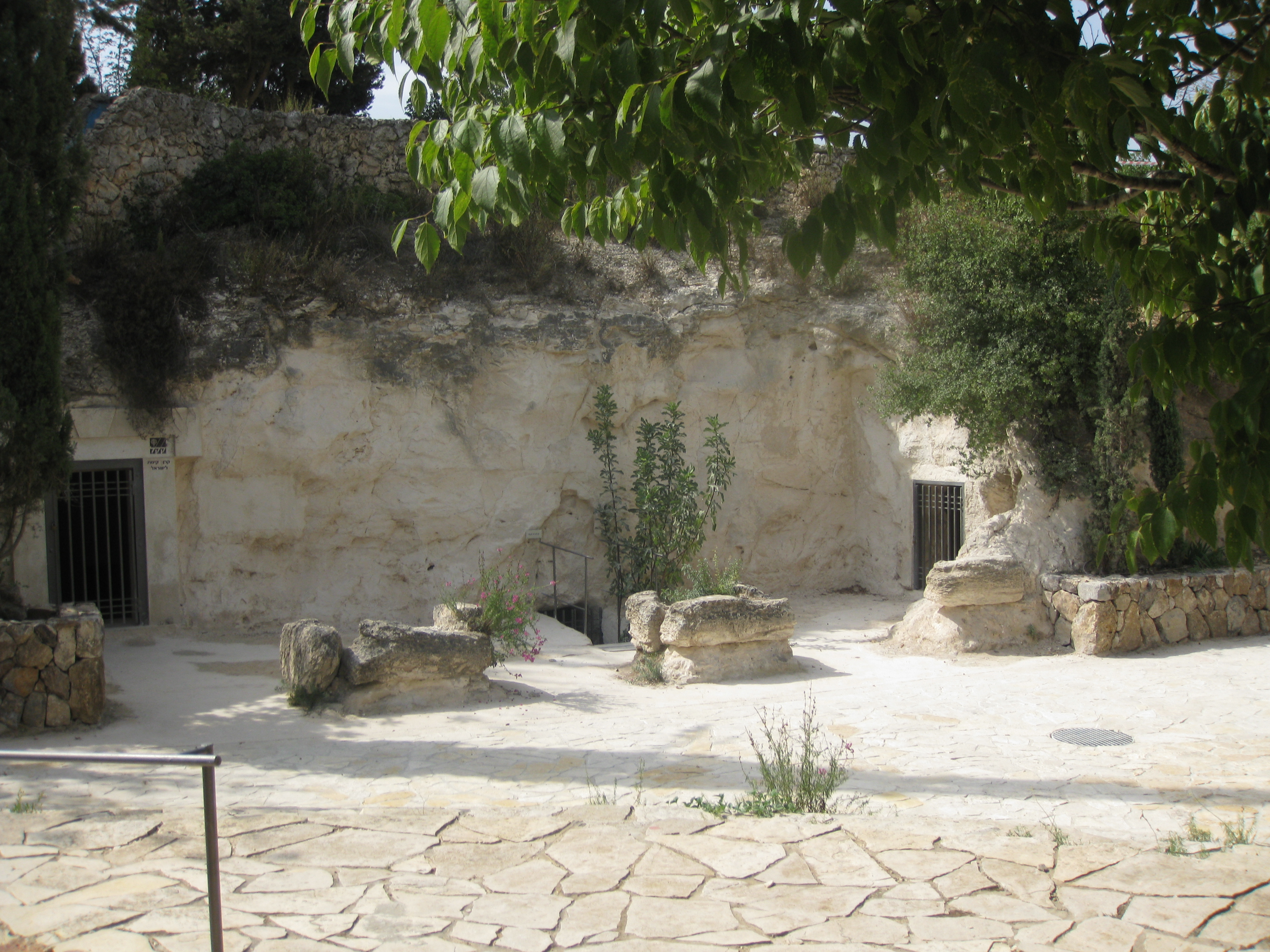
Cave of Nicanor

The Cave of Nicanor (/naɪˈkeɪnər/ ny-KAY-nər; Ancient Greek: Νῑκάνωρ, pronounced [niːˈkanɔːr]) is an ancient, elaborate burial complex located on Mount Scopus in Jerusalem. Among the ossuaries discovered in the cave is one with an inscription referring to "Nicanor the door maker". The cave is located in the National Botanic Garden of Israel on the grounds of the Mount Scopus campus of the Hebrew University of Jerusalem.

Nicanor belonged to a wealthy Alexandrian Jewish family. He is mentioned in the works of the Roman Jewish historian Josephus and the Talmud as the donor of the bronze doors of the Court of the Women in the Second Temple in Jerusalem. This claim is corroborated by an inscription on his ossuary. This represents a rare instance where archaeological evidence confirms historical accounts from written sources.

The tomb consists of five burial halls with numerous loculi, accessed through a porch supported by two square pillars. Excavations revealed seven ossuaries, fragments of a stone sarcophagus, pottery, and oil lamps.

== Discovery ==
In October 1902, the groundskeeper of John Gray Hill's estate on Mount Scopus discovered a burial cave complex in a field just north of his winter home.

As Gray Hill was abroad at the time, the groundskeeper reported the discovery to the British Consul, John Dickson, whose daughter Gladys Dickson, an amateur archaeologist, inspected the cave and its contents. They found seven ossuaries – six ordinary ones and one with a bilingual Hebrew/Greek inscription. The ossuaries were removed from the cave by the groundskeeper, and Dickson was unable to ascertain their original position within. Three days later, R. A. Stewart Macalister, excavating at Tel Gezer at the time, was forced back to Jerusalem by a cholera outbreak and was able to inspect and authenticate the newly discovered cave and inscription, a photograph of which was presented to Charles Simon Clermont-Ganneau.

The following year saw two articles published in the Palestine Exploration Quarterly– Clermont-Ganneau's article on this and other inscriptions, and Gladys Dickson's detailed report on the tomb complex illustrated with plans by Macalister. Gray Hill gave the ossuary to the Palestine Exploration Fund, which transferred it to the British Museum, where it is still to be found.

== Site description ==
There are two burial caves that can be accessed from a hewn rectangular courtyard. The architectural plan of the cave, the artistic style, and finds within it, allow the cave to be dated to the middle of the first century CE. Byzantine pottery found at the bottom of the shafts in the yard and two crosses engraved on the wall of the main room, show that use of the cave continued until the Byzantine period.

The burial cave containing Nicanor's ossuary is typical of the Second Temple period. It contains four burial halls, each with a number of burial niches. In the passages between the halls, rock depressions indicate that the entrances were decorated with stone slabs, a phenomenon unique to this cave. The second cave, consisting of a single burial hall opens to the right, on the eastern side of the courtyard.

== The Nicanor ossuary ==
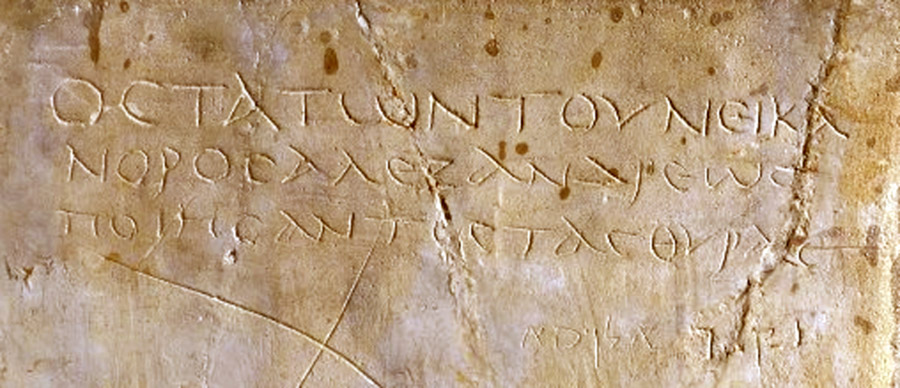
The inscription

The ossuary bears two inscriptions: one in Greek, reading 'The ossuary of Nicanor of Alexandria, who made the gates,' followed by another in Hebrew, written in formal Jewish script, stating 'Nicanor Alexa,' identifying him as 'Nicanor the Alexandrian.'

Nicanor's ossuary is engraved with geometric patterns, with rough red-painted decoration on the lid. The inscriptions appear at one end.

Original	ΟCΤΑΤꞶΝΤΟΥΝΕΙΚΑ; ΝΟΡΟΣΑΛΕξΑΝΔΡΕꞶC; ΠΟΙΗCΑΝΤΟΣΤΑCΘΥΡΑC נקנר אלךסא
Transliteration	Osta tōn tou Neika- noros Alexandreōs poiēsantos tas thyras nqnr ‘lks‘
Translation	Bones of those (i.e. of the house or family) of Nikanor of Alexandria, he who made the gates. Nikanor Alexa

== Later use ==
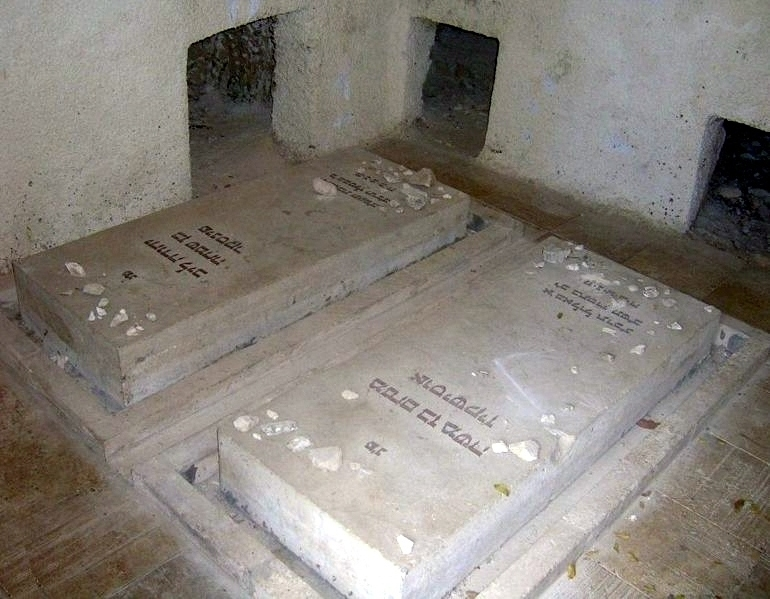
Tombs of Leon Pinsker and Menachem Ussishkin

In 1934, the remains of Leon Pinsker from Odessa were reburied in the Nicanor cave at the initiative of Menachem Ussishkin, who envisaged a national pantheon on Mt. Scopus. However, the only other person buried there was Ussishkin himself, who died in 1941. A national leaders plot was established on Mount Herzl after the founding of the state in 1948, in part because Mount Scopus became an enclave in Jordanian-ruled territory.

== See also ==
- Rock-cut tombs in Israel
- Archaeology of Israel
