= Jerusalem Botanical Gardens =

Botanical garden in Jerusalem, Israel

- הגן הבוטני האוניברסיטאי ירושלים
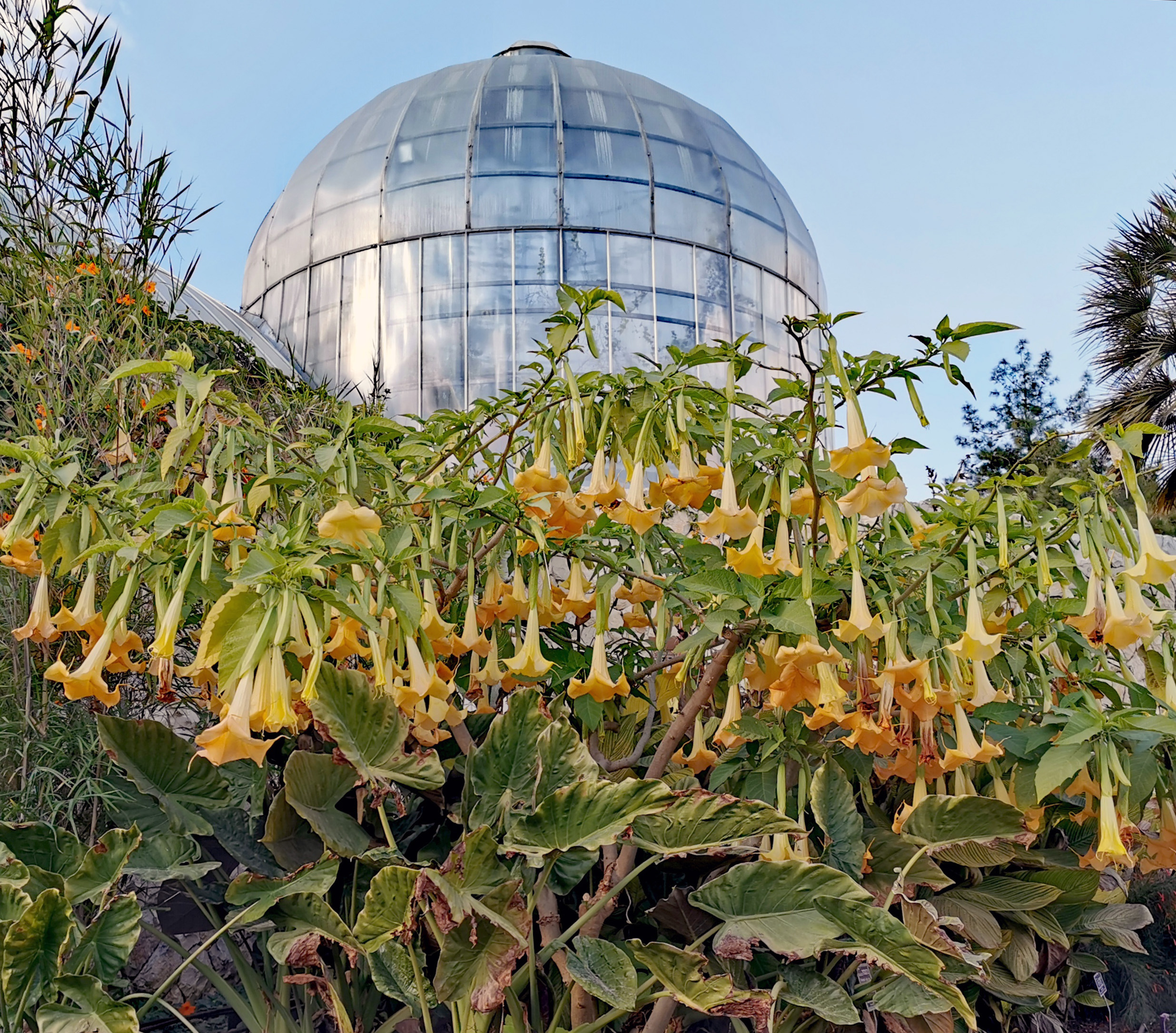
- The tropical conservatory, Jerusalem Botanical Gardens
- Established: 1988
- Location: Yehuda Burla St 1, Nayot; Jerusalem, Israel
- Coordinates: 31°46′10″N 35°12′00″E
- Type: botanic garden
- Collection size: 6,400 species
- Website: www.botanic.co.il

The Jerusalem Botanical Gardens (JBG) is a botanical garden and a center of botanical education and research in Jerusalem, Israel. The largest botanical garden in Israel, it features over 6,000 plant species from around the world, arranged in phytogeographic sections, including Australia, South Africa, Europe, North America, Southwest and Central Asia and the Mediterranean.

The garden, located in Nayot on the southeastern edge of the Givat Ram campus of the Hebrew University of Jerusalem, opened to the public in 1985 as a successor to the National Botanic Garden of Israel on Mount Scopus, which still exists today as a separate entity.

== History ==
Plans for the first National Botanic Garden of Israel, on a plot of land purchased on Mount Scopus in 1926, were drawn up by Alexander Eig, chairman of the Botany Department of the Hebrew University, based on the flora of the Land of Israel from Mount Lebanon to the desert. Planting began in 1931. The botanical gardens on Mount Scopus were the first home of the Biblical Zoo.

In 1948, in the 1947–1949 Palestine war, access to Mount Scopus and the university campus was cut off from the rest of Israel, and it was decided to create a new Botanical Garden (the subject of this entry) near the Jewish National and University Library, on the new campus of the Hebrew University in Givat Ram in western Jerusalem. The new Botanical Garden, including a unique collection of Coniferae, was opened in 1954, soon after the establishment of Givat Ram campus. In 1962, a rocky hill in the southeastern corner of the campus was planted with conifers from North America. That year, Michael Avishai was appointed scientific director of the gardens. Many of the trees were raised from his private seed collection.

Budgeting was a serious problem until 1975, when the Society of Friends of the Botanical Gardens was established and the garden became a joint project of the university, the Jerusalem Municipality and the Jewish National Fund. A scientific board was appointed, and architect Shlomo Aronson was commissioned to plan the layout. In 1981, the Garden Association was founded, and a board of executives appointed. The garden was opened to the public in 1985. In 1994, it separated from the Hebrew University, and has been managed by the Botanical Garden Association since 1996.

Key developments include the tropical conservatory in 1986, the South Africa section in 1989, and the Hank Greenspan Entrance Plaza, Dvorsky Visitors’ Center, and restaurant in 1990.

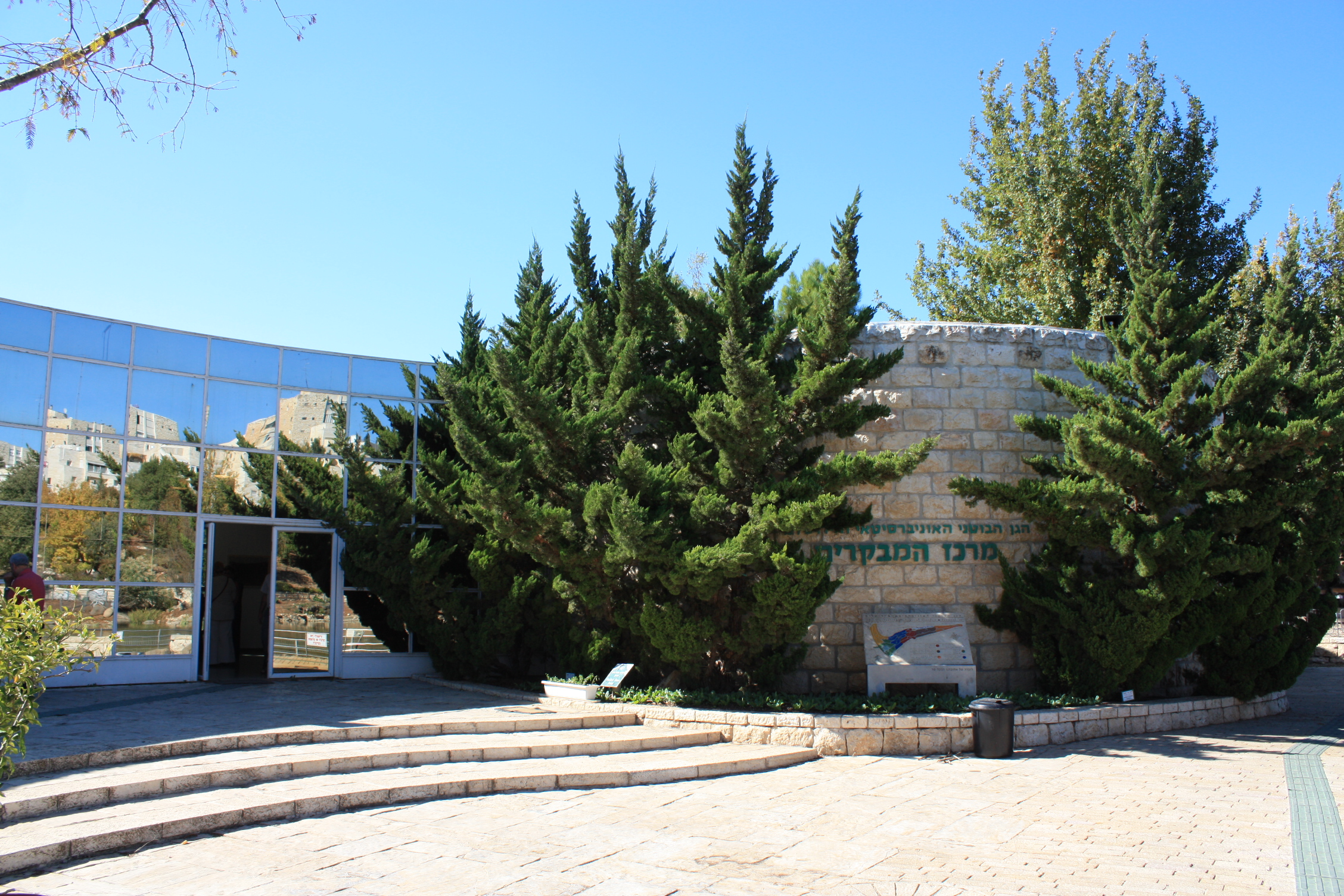
Dvorsky Visitors' Center

== Collection ==
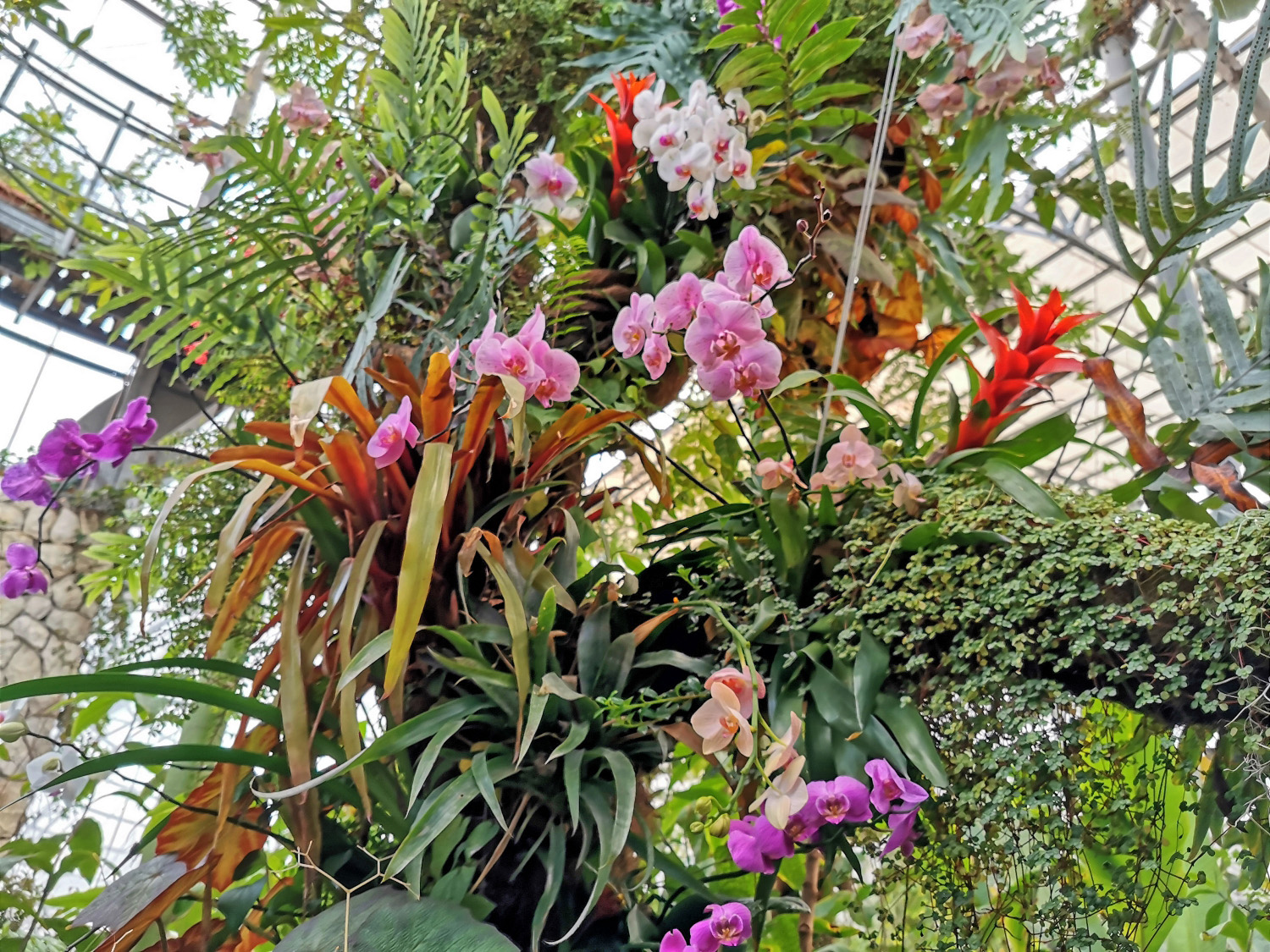
The tropical conservatory

The Jerusalem Botanical Gardens is the largest botanical garden in Israel and the Middle East. It features an expansive collection of living plants, totalling over 6,400 species and varieties from various regions worldwide. Spanning 30 acres, the garden showcases flora from Australia, South Africa, Europe, North America, Southwest and Central Asia and the Mediterranean.

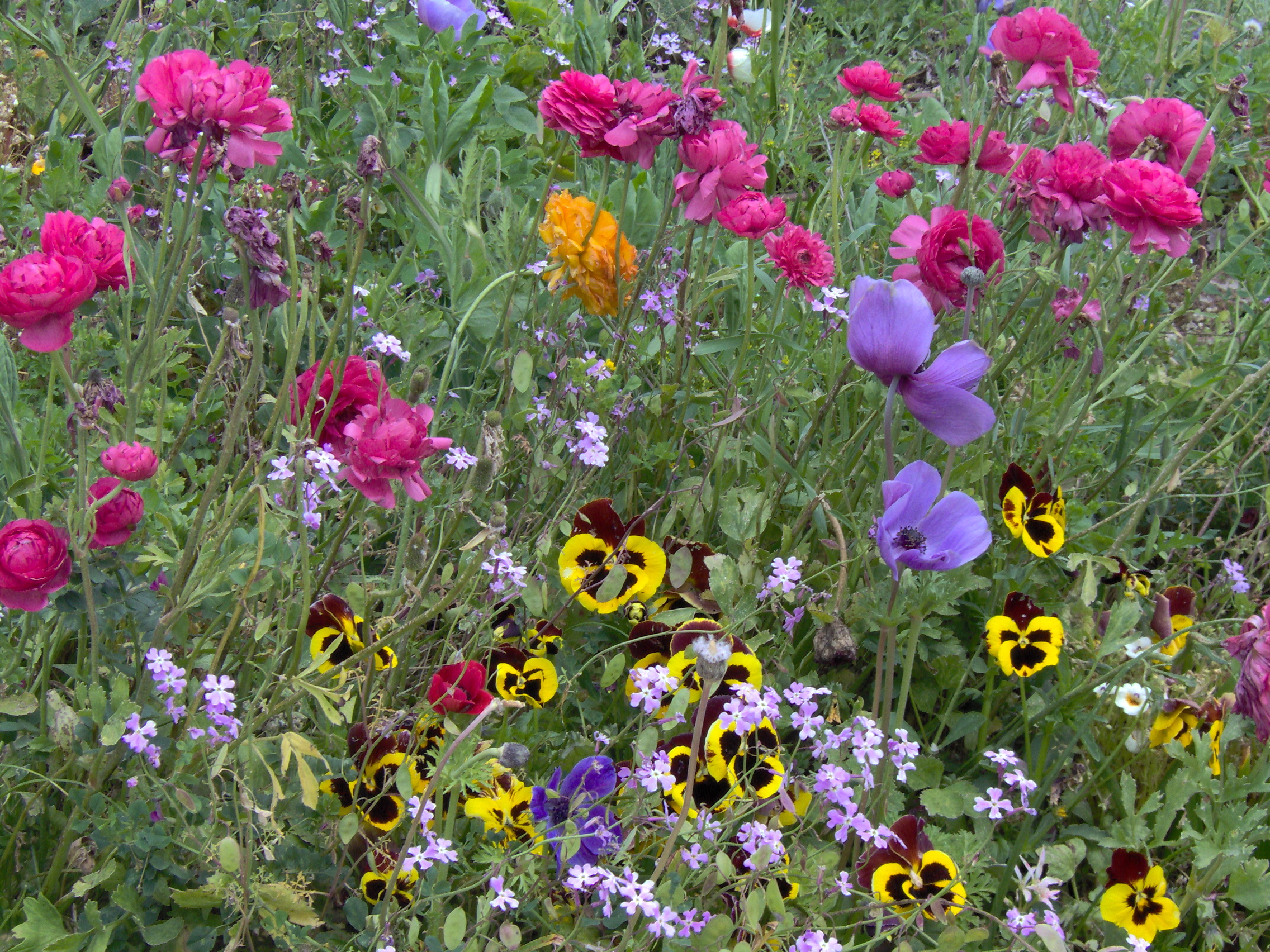
Flowers blooming at the Jerusalem Botanical Gardens

=== Japanese section and bonsai ===
The garden's Japanese section contains over 150 bonsai trees, the largest concentrated collection of bonsai trees in the world. A new pagoda is currently under construction at the garden. It will serve as a focal point for the gardens' collection of Japanese plants. The pagoda was designed in Japan and arrived as modular pieces that were assembled on-site.

=== Birds ===
Birdwatchers have identified 46 species of birds that visit the Gardens throughout the year.

=== Bible path ===
The 500-meter long "Bible Path" is planted with most of the 70 species that scientists have identified as some of the 400 types of plants mentioned in the Bible.

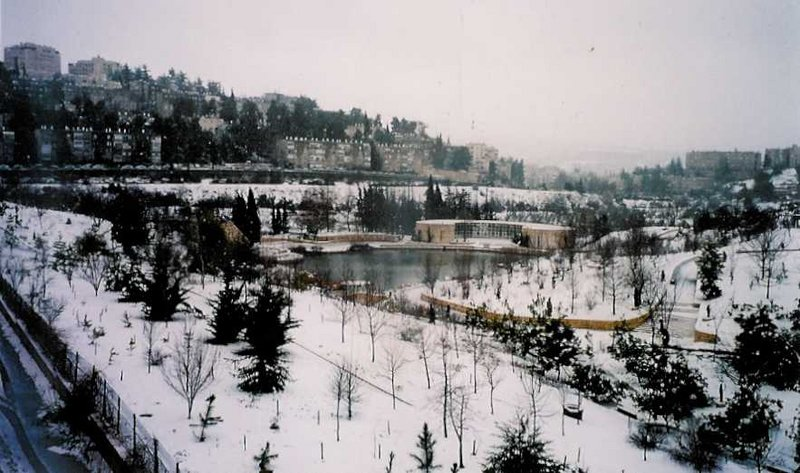
Jerusalem Botanical Gardens in the snow

== Gene bank of endangered species ==
One of the goals of the garden is to create a living gene bank to protect endangered plants in Israel and the region as a whole.

== Events ==
=== Winter Lights festival ===
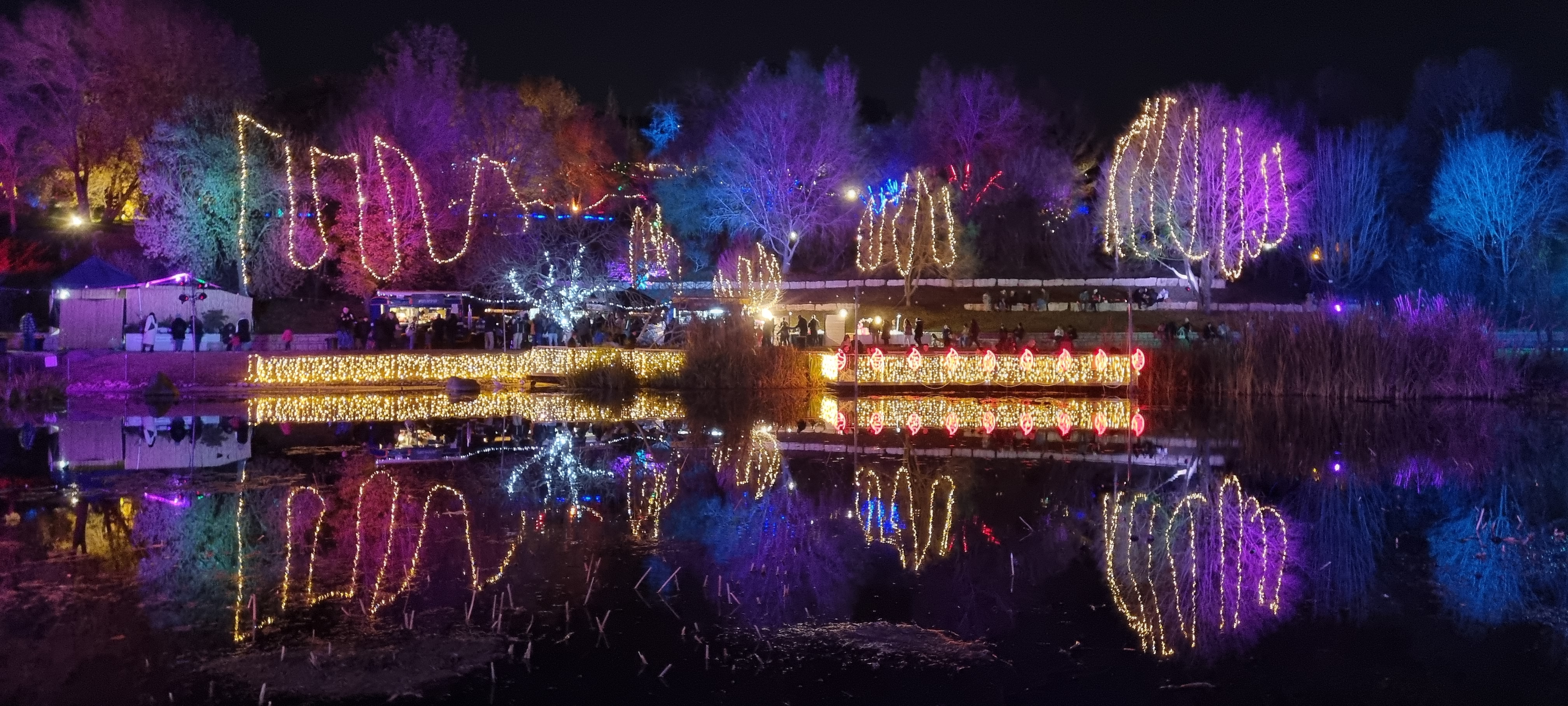
Winter Lights

In recent years, the Jerusalem Botanical Gardens has hosted the Winter Lights Festival, an annual event held during December to coincide with Hannukah and Christmas celebrations. This festival showcases elaborate lighting designs illuminating a 700-meter path by more than 2.5 million small LEDs. Alongside the displays, the festival features performances by artists and actors in costumes, as well as comfort food vendors and additional attractions.

== See also ==
- List of botanical gardens in Israel
- National Botanic Garden of Israel
- Wildlife of Israel
- Tourism in Israel
