= R v Wallace =

English criminal case

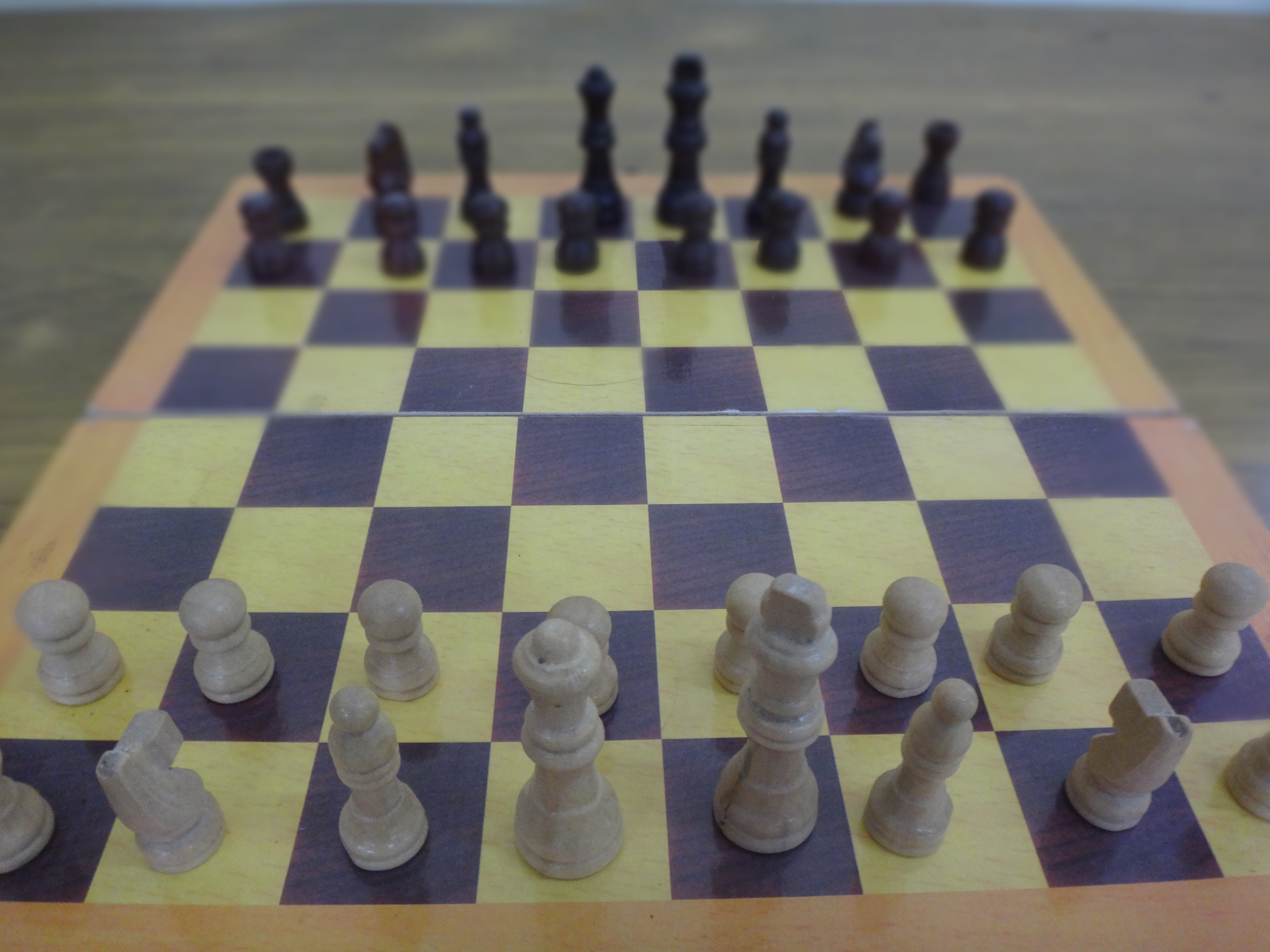
- Wallace received a telephone message at his chess club requesting he attend a meeting on the night of his wife's murder
- Court: Court of Appeal (England and Wales)
- Decided: 1931
- Citation: 23 Cr App R 32

Case history
- Prior action: Conviction in the Crown Court (Circuit Assizes) at Liverpool

Keywords
- murder; mere suspicion; verdict unreasonable; or verdict cannot be supported; regard to the evidence

R v Wallace (1931) 23 Cr App R 32 is a leading English criminal case, the first time a conviction for murder was overturned on the ground that the verdict "cannot be supported, having regard to the evidence", as provided for by Section 4(1) of the Criminal Appeal Act 1907. The headnote states: "The Court will quash a conviction founded on mere suspicion". William Herbert Wallace, a 52-year-old insurance agent, had been convicted at the Liverpool Assizes in 1931 of the brutal murder of his wife, Julia Wallace, and sentenced to death.

== Facts ==
The case against Wallace was circumstantial. On 19 January 1931, someone telephoned the Liverpool Central Chess Club that Wallace frequented, asking him to visit "R. M. Qualtrough" at 7.30pm the following evening to discuss an insurance policy. They gave an address of 25 Menlove Gardens East in Mossley Hill, a district of south Liverpool several miles from Wallace's home in Anfield. Wallace arrived at the chess club about 25 minutes after the phone call, and was informed of the message by the club captain, Samuel Beattie.

The following night, a milk boy visited Wallace's house around 6:30pm, and saw his wife. Wallace left home at about fifteen minutes later, catching several trams to Mossley Hill. He couldn't find the address; there were Menlove Gardens North, South and West, but not East. He asked numerous people and a policemen about the address and Qualtrough, but nobody could help. After 40 minutes, he gave up and got a tram home. He entered his house around 8.45pm, witnessed by his neighbours John Sharpe Johnston and Florence Sarah Johnston, and found his wife bludgeoned to death in the parlour, with evidence of a bungled robbery.

The police discovered that the telephone call had been made from a public call box only 400 yards from Wallace's home, and thought Wallace had made the call himself to create an elaborate alibi, and had in fact murdered his wife before leaving his house the following evening. However, no trace of blood was found on Wallace even when his clothing was benzidine tested, although the killer would have been heavily bloodstained, and a milk-boy's testimony of seeing Mrs. Wallace alive sometime between 6.30pm and 6.45pm left Wallace scarcely enough time to kill his wife, clean himself up, and stage a robbery before catching his tram. The murder-weapon was not found, and no motive could be ascribed to Wallace in killing his wife. On the contrary, Wallace, 52, was in poor health, and his wife had fulfilled the role of companion and occasional nurse (though the couple often employed outside help when in poor health). They had been married 17 years and had no children. (Note: Contemporary reports say Julia Wallace was of the same age. She was 17 years older than he, almost 70 at the time of her death. (per Murphy, 2001))

When investigations into other suspects such as Richard Gordon Parry fell flat, the police charged Wallace with murder. (Note: It is now known there was a more credible suspect — a young man and former colleague of Wallace's, with criminal propensities, who was familiar with the layout of Wallace's home and his insurance collections. Wallace and others in fact named him to the police, but he appeared to have an alibi — evidence suggests Parry had an unknown accomplice who entered the house, posing as "Qualtrough", and murdered Julia, when confronted after rifling the cash-box. (per Brown, 2018))

At the committal hearing, several factual misstatements were made by the prosecuting solicitor, and these were widely reported in the local press. The feeling in Liverpool was anti-Wallace, and although the jury was selected from outside the city environs, they came from nearby towns, which could have been infected by prejudice. Wallace cut an austere, fusty figure, and his stoicism throughout his ordeal, combined with his intellectual hobbies of chess, botany and chemistry, gave the impression to some of a cold, calculating killer who had contrived to commit the perfect murder.

Wallace was tried at St. George's Hall at the Assizes in April 1931. Edward Hemmerde, KC led for the Crown, assisted by Leslie Walsh. Roland Oliver, KC, assisted by Sydney Scholefield Allen, led for the Defence (instructed by solicitor Hector Munro of H. J. Davis, Berthen and Munro).

During cross-examination it became clear that the police surgeon had blundered, in not taking temperature to ascertain the time of death, and the police had allowed the poorly-preserved crime-scene to become cross-contaminated. Indeed, the investigating officers' fingerprints were found all over the crime scene, and in different photographs of the same rooms many objects are in different positions or even entirely absent.

Beattie, the recipient of the telephone message at the chess-club, who knew Wallace well, was adamant that the voice was not Wallace's.

== Verdicts ==
=== Trial ===
The trial was presided by Mr. Justice Wright, who summed up the case as "almost unexampled in the annals of crime." Key pieces of evidence were centred on who made the telephone call as "Qualtrough" and what of Wallace's time was unaccounted for and whether it could be sufficient to commit the murder. The judge repeatedly told the jury that the evidence did not exclude the reasonable possibility that someone else had committed the crime. He summed up for an acquittal.

=== Church of England's intervention ===
After Wallace been sentenced to death, public opinion started to swing in his favour. The Church of England offered special prayers – "intercessions extraordinary" at Liverpool Cathedral.

=== Court of Appeal ===
The prospects for Wallace's appeal were not good, because the Court of Criminal Appeal had never overturned a conviction in a capital case on the grounds that the verdict was "unreasonable, or cannot be supported having regard to the evidence", and those were the only grounds of appeal available.

The appeal was heard on 18 May and 19 May 1931 at the Royal Courts of Justice, Strand, London by Lord Chief Justice Hewart, sitting with Mr Justice Hawke and Mr Justice Branson.

Unusually, the court retired for 47 minutes, to consider its verdict. The ruling, delivered by Lord Hewart CJ, was the appeal was allowed and the conviction quashed. This set a precedent that a case could be appealed on the grounds of incorrect judgement of facts, rather than an incorrect application of law.

== See also ==
- English criminal law

== Bibliography ==
- Adam, Hargrave Lee (1932). Murder Most Mysterious – via The Internet Archive.
- Wyndham-Brown, WF (1933). The Trial of William Herbert Wallace. Victor Gollancz Ltd.online copy at The Internet Archive
- Lustgarden, Edgar (1950). Verdict in Dispute.online copy at The Internet Archive
- Wallace: The Final Verdict (1985) by Roger Wilkes. Grafton ISBN 978-0-586-06452-8
- The Murder of Julia Wallace (2001) by James Murphy. Bluecoat Press ISBN 978-1-872568-81-2
- The Killing of Julia Wallace (2012) by John Gannon. Amberley ISBN 978-1-4456-0506-7
- Move to Murder (2018) by Antony M Brown. Mirror Books ISBN 978-1-907324-73-4
