= William Herbert Wallace =

Englishman acquitted of murder on appeal

William Herbert Wallace (29 August 1878 – 26 February 1933) was a British man convicted in 1931 of the murder of his wife, Julia, in their home in Wolverton Street in Liverpool's Anfield district. Wallace's conviction was later overturned by the Court of Criminal Appeal, the first instance in British legal history where an appeal had been allowed after re-examination of evidence. The case, with its strange background, has long been the subject of speculation and has generated many books, being regarded internationally as a classic murder mystery.

== Background ==
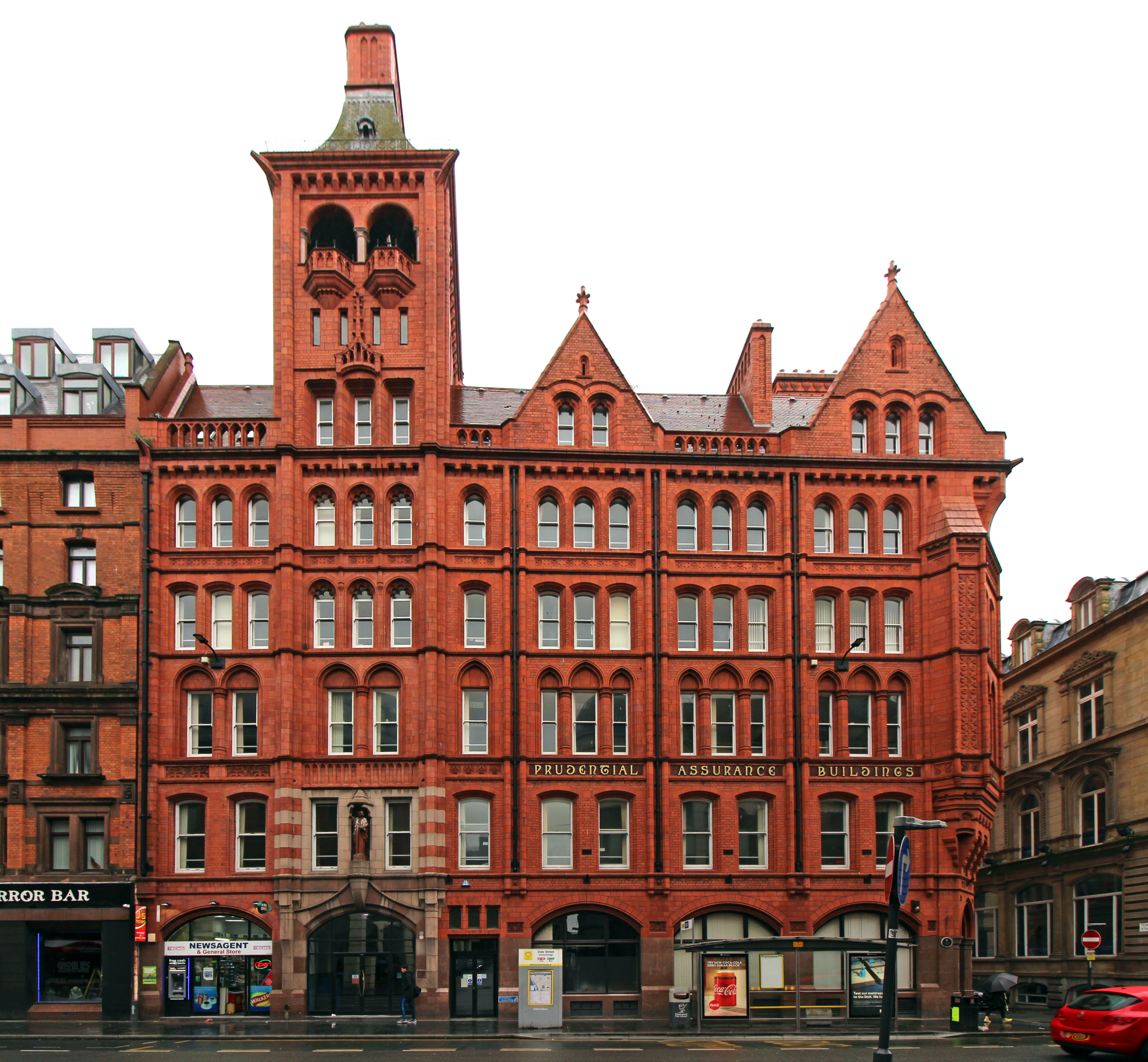
The Prudential Assurance Building in Liverpool

William Herbert Wallace was born in Millom, Cumberland, in 1878; he was the eldest of three children born to Benjamin and Margery Wallace, having a younger brother and sister. On leaving school at age 14 he began training as a draper's assistant in Barrow-in-Furness, Lancashire, and on finishing his apprenticeship he obtained a position in Manchester with Messrs Whiteway Laidlaw and Company, outfitters to the British Armed Forces and the Colonial, Indian and Diplomatic Services. In 1903, after five years' service, Wallace obtained a transfer to the company's branch in Calcutta, India, where he remained for two years. On the suggestion of his brother Joseph, who lived in Shanghai, Wallace sought another transfer to Whiteway Laidlaw's branch of that city in 1905.

A recurrent kidney complaint resulted in Wallace resigning his position and returning to England in 1907, where his left kidney was removed at Guy's Hospital. Little is recorded of his life after this time, until he obtained a position working for the Liberal Party in Harrogate, rising to the post of election agent in 1911. During his time in Harrogate, he met Julia Dennis (1861–1931), and they were married there in March 1914. All early sources suggested that Julia was approximately the same age as Wallace, but in 2001 James Murphy demonstrated from her original birth certificate that she was actually seventeen years older than he was. Julia's father was a destitute alcoholic farmer from near Northallerton, who had died in 1875, leaving her an orphan at the age of 13. In later life Julia exaggerated her antecedents, claiming her father had been a veterinary surgeon and her mother French.

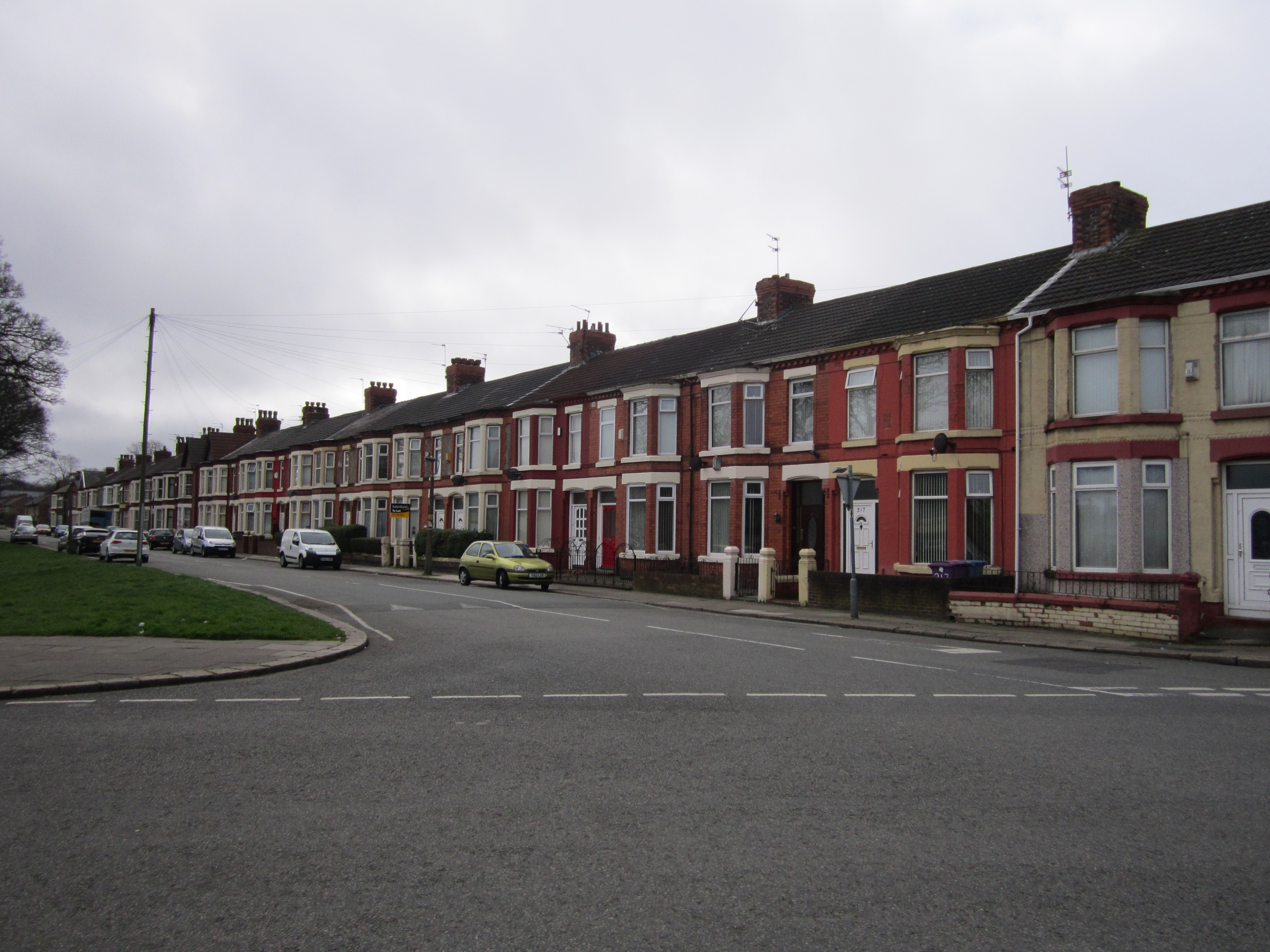
Typical street in Clubmoor, where Wallace worked for sixteen years

At the outbreak of the First World War, the position of Liberal election agent in Harrogate was discontinued, owing to the suspension of elections and a parliamentary truce, and Wallace once again found himself looking for a job. Through the help of his father, he obtained a position as a collections agent with the Prudential Assurance Company in Liverpool. The Wallaces moved there in 1915, settling at 29 Wolverton Street in the district of Anfield. During the 1920s, Wallace supplemented his comfortable but mundane existence as a collections agent, working exclusively in the neighbouring Clubmoor district, by lecturing part-time in chemistry at Liverpool Technical College. His hobbies included chemistry, botany and chess, and in 1928 he learned to play the violin to enable him to accompany Julia, who was an accomplished pianist, in "musical evenings" at their home at Wolverton Street.

== The crime ==
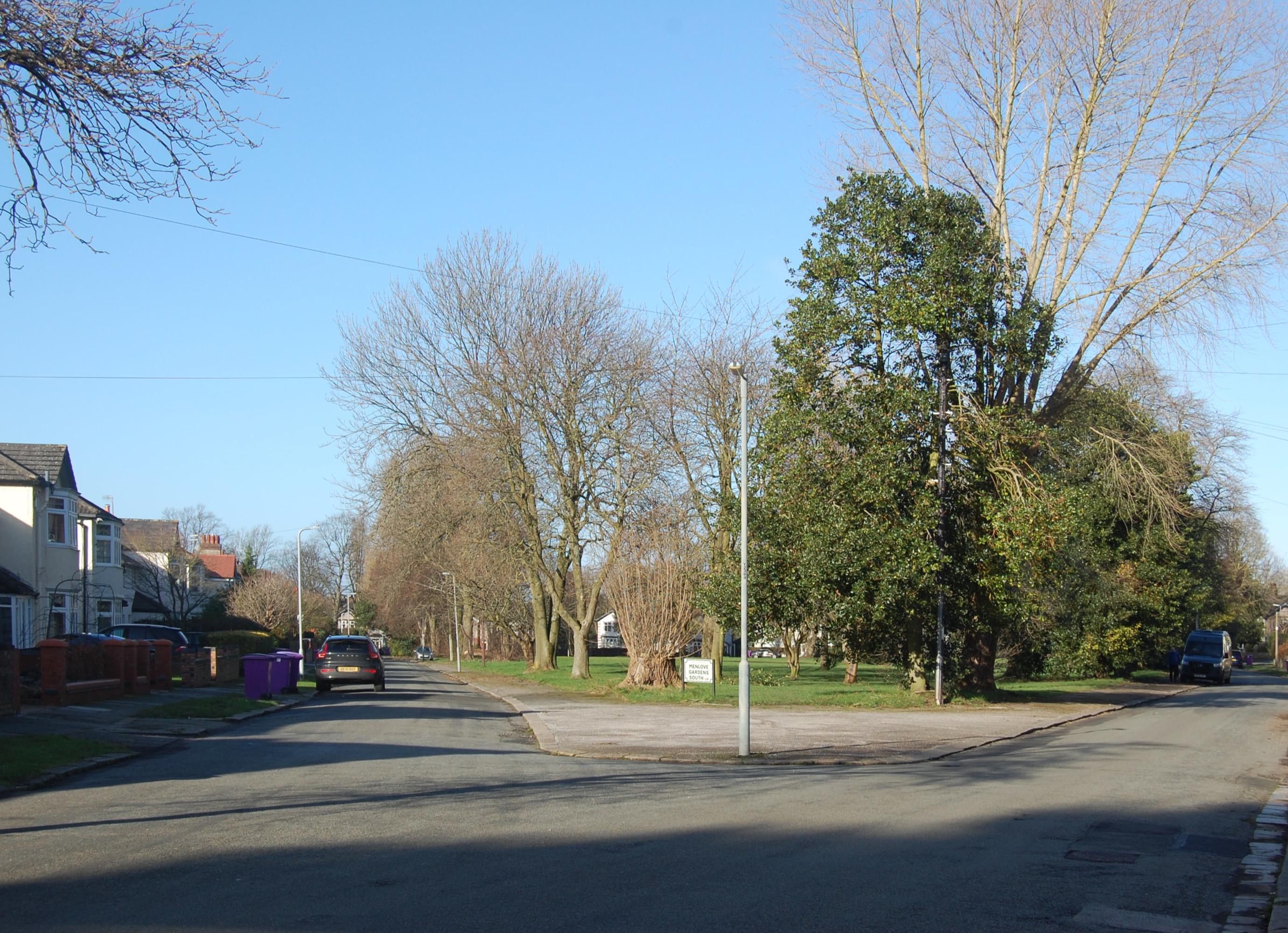
Menlove Gardens, at the location where Menlove Gardens East should have been, but wasn't.

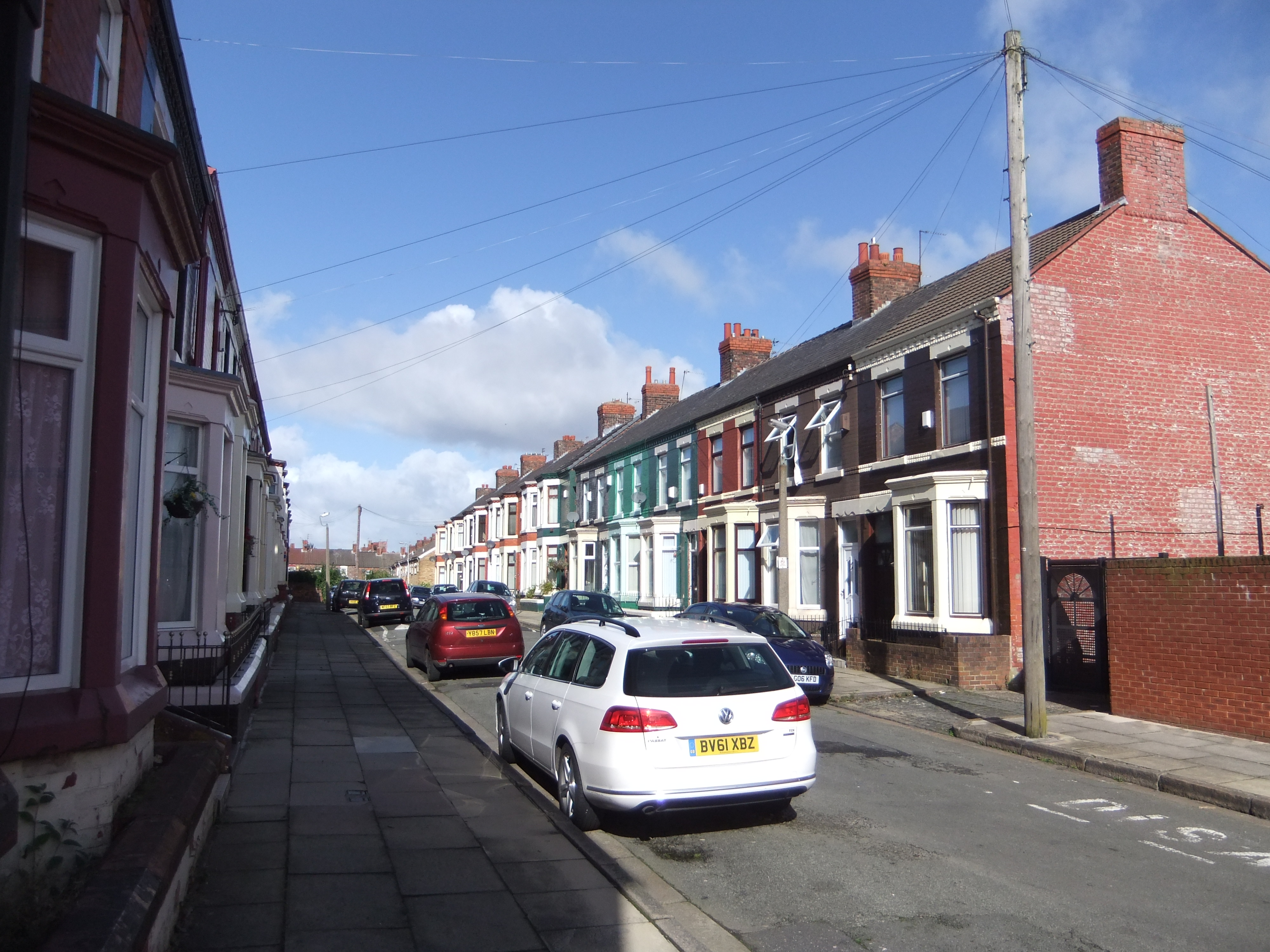
Wallace and his wife lived at 29 Wolverton St in Anfield. The row of buildings had been built in 1910.

On the evening of Monday 19 January 1931, Wallace, aged 52, attended a meeting of the Liverpool Central Chess Club to play a scheduled chess game. While there he was handed a message, which had been received by telephone about twenty-five minutes before he arrived. It requested that he call at an address at 25 Menlove Gardens East, Liverpool, at 7.30 pm the following evening to discuss insurance with a man who had given his name as "R. M. Qualtrough".

The following night, Wallace duly made his way by tramcar to the south of the city at the time requested, only to discover that while there were Menlove Gardens North, South and West, there was no East. He called at 25 Menlove Gardens West, and asked several passers-by in the neighbourhood for directions, but to no avail. Wallace also spoke to a policeman on his beat, and made inquiries in a nearby newsagent's, but nobody he asked was able to help him in his search for the address or the mysterious Qualtrough.

After searching the district for about forty-five minutes, Wallace returned home. Neighbours John and Florence Johnston were heading out for the evening when they encountered Wallace in the back alleyway, complaining that he could not gain entry to his home at either the front or the back. While they watched, Wallace tried the back door again, which now opened. Inside he found his wife, Julia, had been brutally beaten to death in their sitting room.

== The investigation ==
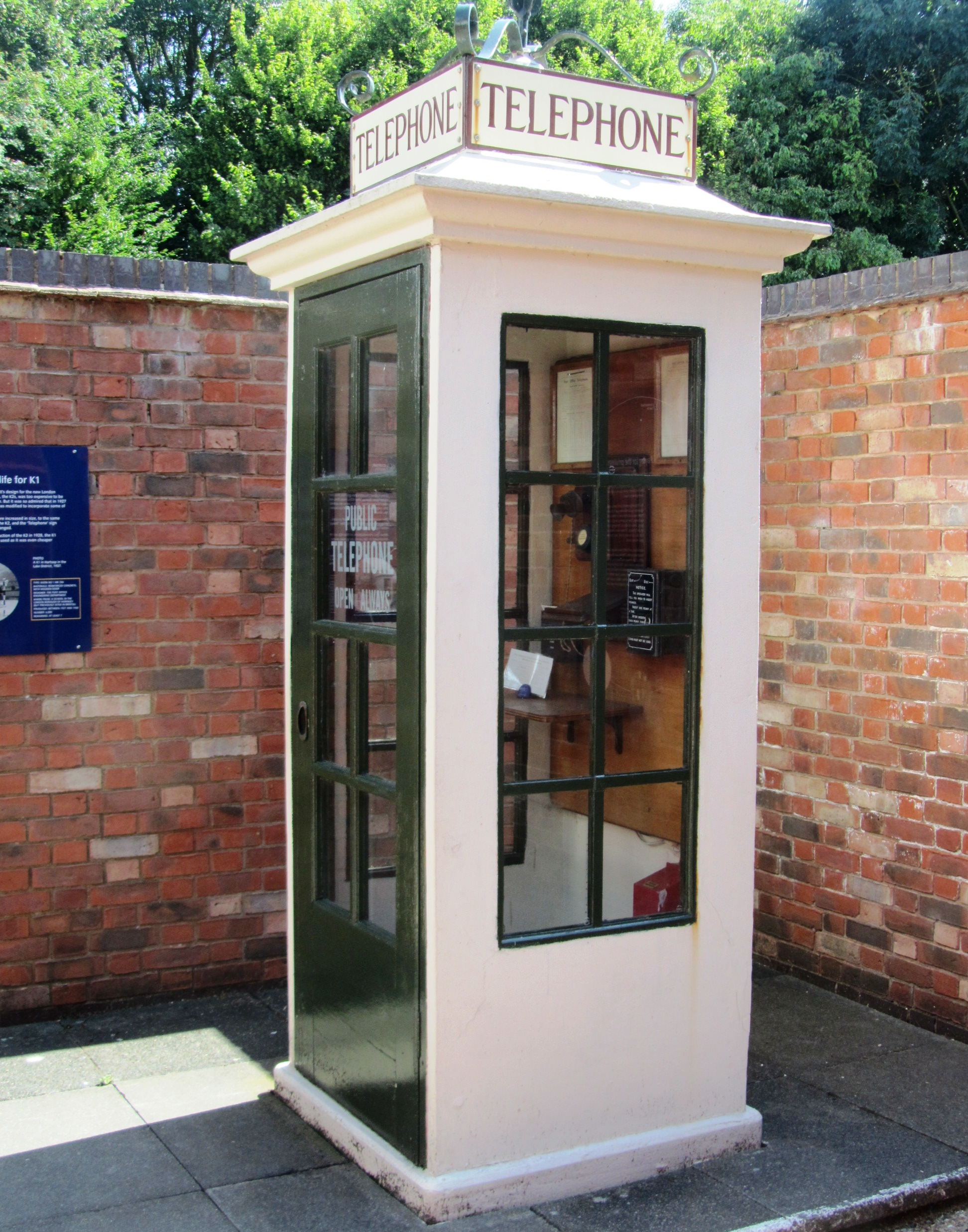
The call was made from a K1 phone box 400 yards from Wallace's house.

Up to his arrest two weeks later, Wallace made four voluntary statements. While he was never intensively questioned by police, he was required to attend CID headquarters every day and was asked specific questions about whether the Wallaces had a maid, why he had subsequently asked the man who had taken the telephone message at the chess club to be specific about the time he took it and whether he had spoken to anyone in the street on his way back to his house from his abortive attempt to find Mr. Qualtrough. Police had evidence that the telephone box used by "Qualtrough" to make his call to the chess club was situated just 400 yards (370 m) from Wallace's home, although the person in the café who took the call was quite certain it was not Wallace on the other end of the line. Nevertheless, police began to suspect that "Qualtrough" and Wallace were the same man. Wallace's legal team conducted timing tests that showed it was possible for someone to have made the call, catch a tram and arrive at the chess club when Wallace did, and it was equally possible for Wallace to arrive at the same time by boarding at the stop he claimed he had used, nowhere near the telephone box. These tests were not introduced as evidence at trial since, ultimately, the Crown offered nothing to controvert Wallace's assertion that he had boarded the tram elsewhere and did not make the phone call.

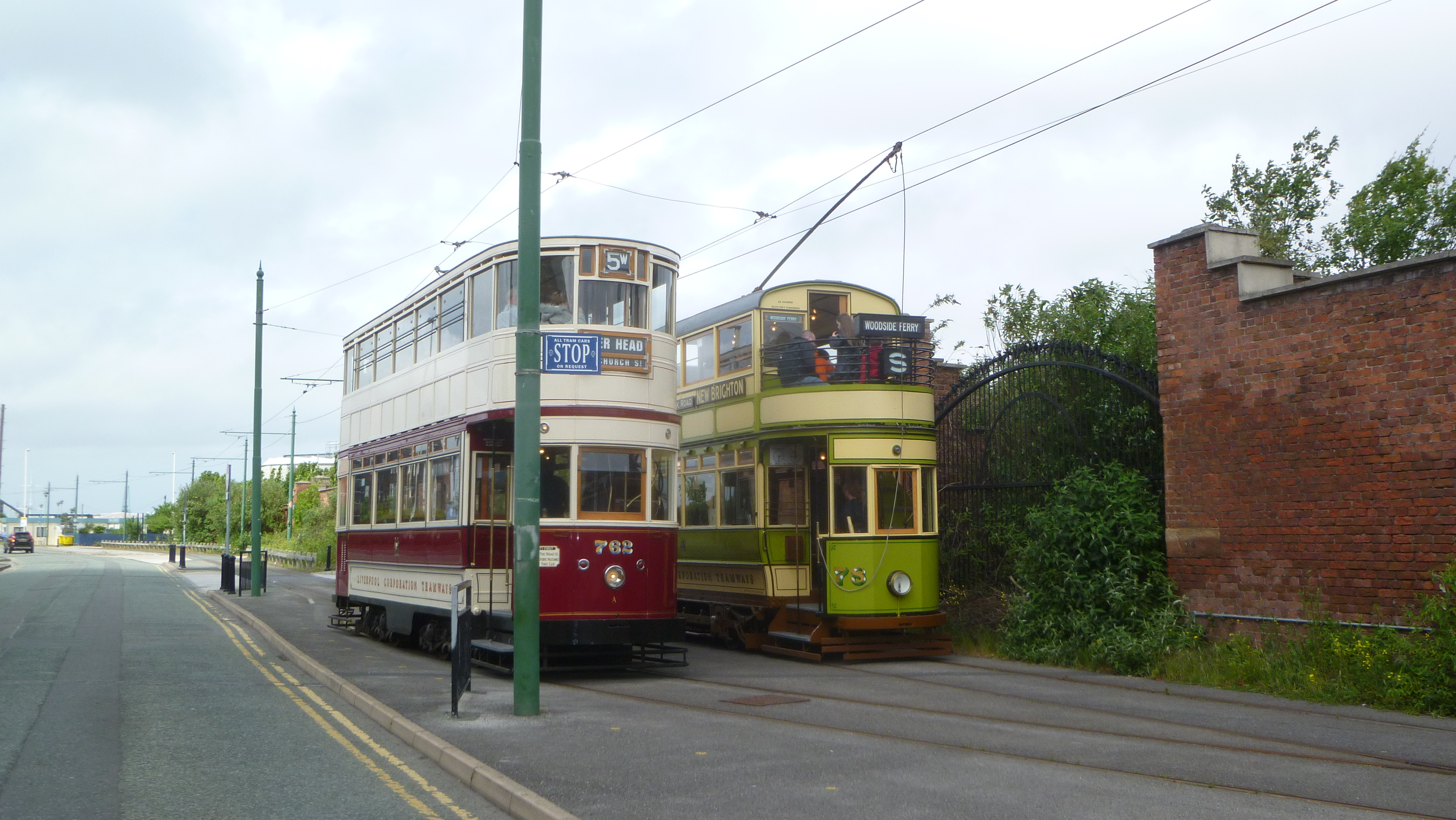
The Police examined Wallace's journey by three trams to the non-existent address

Police were also convinced that it would have been possible for Wallace to murder his wife and still have time to arrive at the spot where he boarded his tram. They attempted to prove this by having a fit young detective go through the motions of the murder and then sprint all the way to the tram stop, something an ailing 52-year-old Wallace probably could not have accomplished. The original assessment of the time of death, around 8 pm, was also later changed to just after 6 pm although there was no additional evidence on which to base the earlier timing. A milk-boy witness who claimed to have spoken to Mrs. Wallace on her doorstep sometime after 6.30 pm further undermined the Crown's case, leaving Wallace an extremely narrow window in which he could possibly have committed the "frenzied" crime, yet emerge blood-free and composed only minutes later to catch his tram.

Forensic examination of the crime scene had revealed that Julia's attacker was likely to have been heavily contaminated with her blood, given the brutal and frenzied nature of the assault. Wallace's suit, which he had been wearing on the night of the murder, was examined closely but no trace of bloodstains were found. Police formed the theory that a mackintosh, which was inexplicably found under Julia's corpse, had been used by a naked Wallace to shield himself from blood spatter while committing the crime. Examination of the bath and drains revealed that they had not been recently used, and there was no trace of blood there either, apart from a single tiny clot in the toilet pan, the origin of which could not be established, but was alleged to have been the result of inadvertent cross-contamination by police.

== Trial and appeal ==
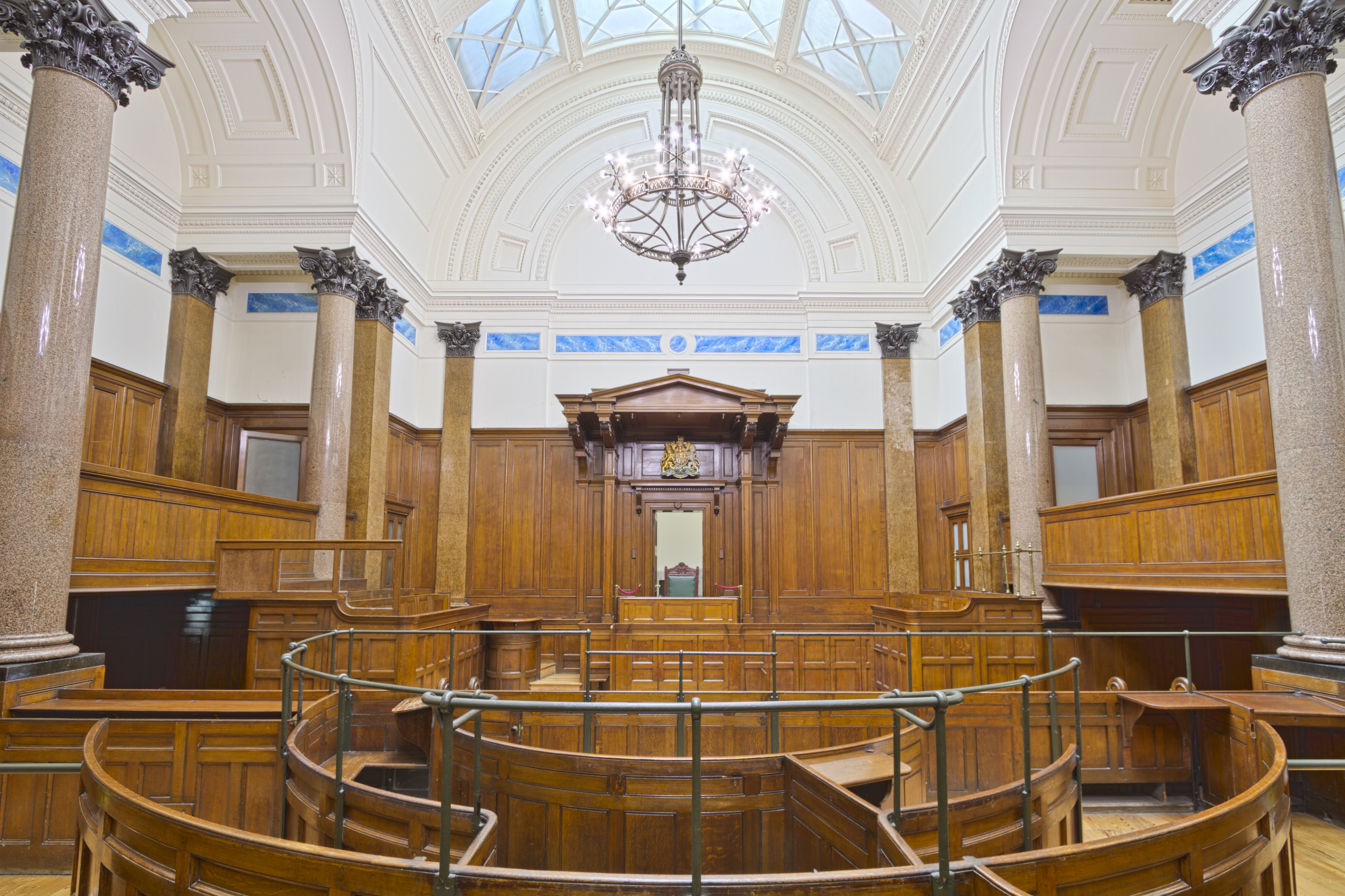
The court at St George's Hall, Liverpool where Wallace was tried in April 1931

Wallace consistently denied having anything to do with the crime but was charged with murder and stood trial at the Liverpool Assizes on 22 April 1931. After conducting a secret mock-trial in London, which unanimously found Wallace not guilty, the Prudential Staff Union sponsored his defence. Despite the evidence against him being purely circumstantial, and the statement of the milk-boy—who was certain he had spoken to Julia only minutes before her husband would have had to leave to catch his tram—Wallace was found guilty after an hour's deliberation by the Liverpool jury, and sentenced to death.

F. J. Salfeld (1905–2001), who was present in the courtroom, commented, "what probably harmed [Wallace] most at his trial was his extraordinary composure. Like every other observer, I found enigmatic his seeming indifference to his surroundings. Shock? Callousness? Stoicism? Confidence? We shall never know."

In an unprecedented move, the Court of Criminal Appeal quashed the verdict in May 1931 on the grounds that it "cannot be supported, having regard to the evidence", and Wallace was set free. The decision meant that the jury was wrong in law, and in fact there was no evidence against Wallace—appeals are usually brought on the basis of bad decisions by the presiding judge at the original trial or by the emergence of new evidence.

No other person was charged with the murder, and it remains officially unsolved. A further mock trial, conducted by the Merseyside Medico-Legal Society in 1977, presided over by Mr. Justice Lawton, also found Wallace not guilty. Robert Montgomery QC led for the prosecution while Richard Whittington-Egan led for the defence.

== Later life and death ==
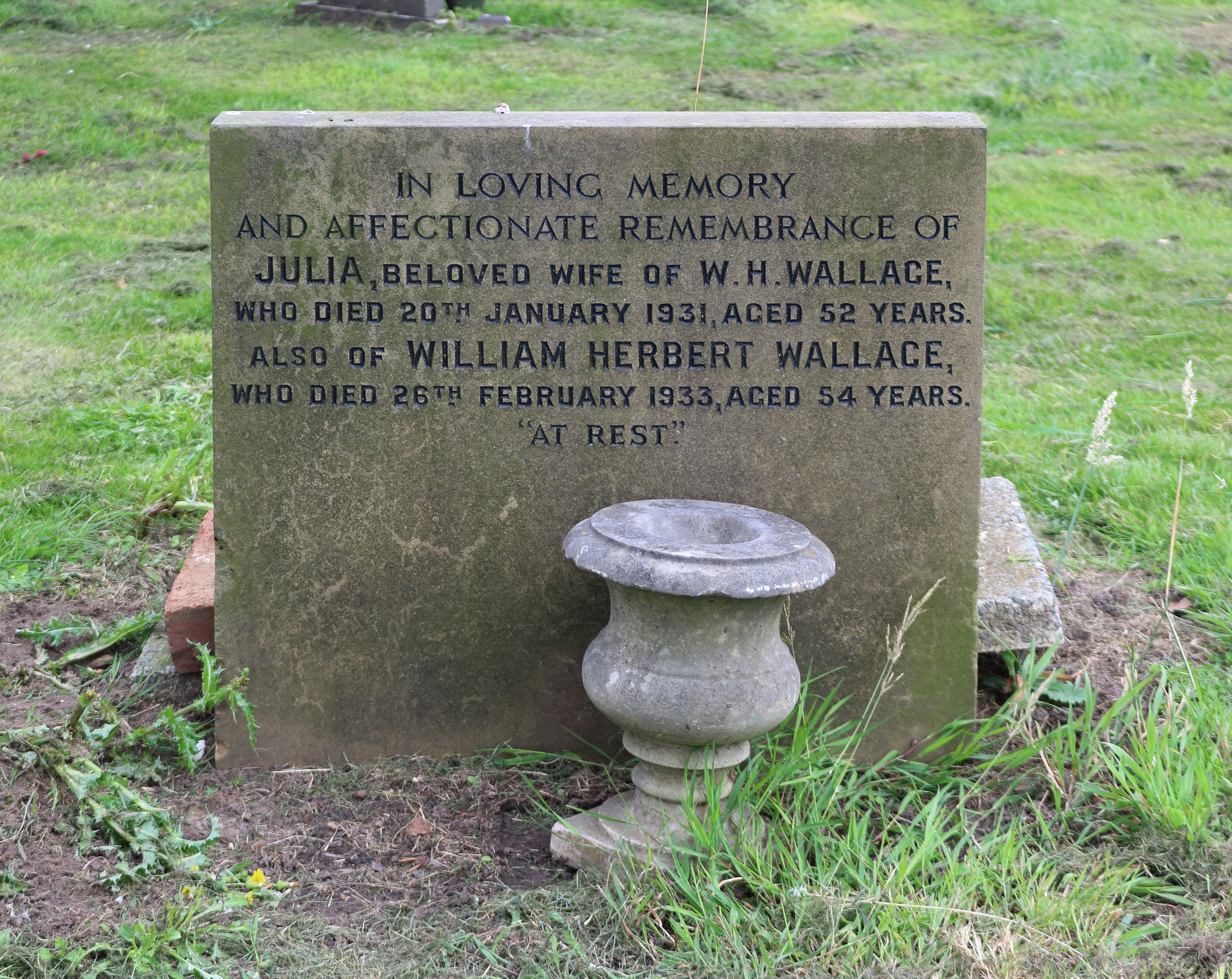
The Wallaces' grave in Anfield Cemetery

After his successful appeal, Wallace returned to his job in insurance but resigned after suffering from declining health and moved to the Wirral. On 26 February 1933, less than two years after the appeal, he died from uraemia and pyelonephritis at Clatterbridge Hospital at age 54. He is buried in Anfield Cemetery with his wife.

== Richard Gordon Parry ==
=== Jonathan Goodman, 1960s ===
In the 1960s, crime writer Jonathan Goodman made inquiries that led him to a junior employee at Prudential who had worked with Wallace. This man had done some of Wallace's collection work for him when the older man had been ill in 1928. Wallace had then had first-hand evidence that the younger man did not pay in all the premiums which he had collected. Yet for whatever reason, Wallace did not seem to have passed this information on to his employer. About a year later, the young man left Prudential to join another insurance firm. Wallace was later told that while this man had not been sacked he had left under something of a cloud, his father making up some of his son's shortfall. The young man was also acquainted with Julia. Goodman mentioned him, but not by name, in his book The Killing of Julia Wallace.

=== Roger Wilkes, 1981 ===
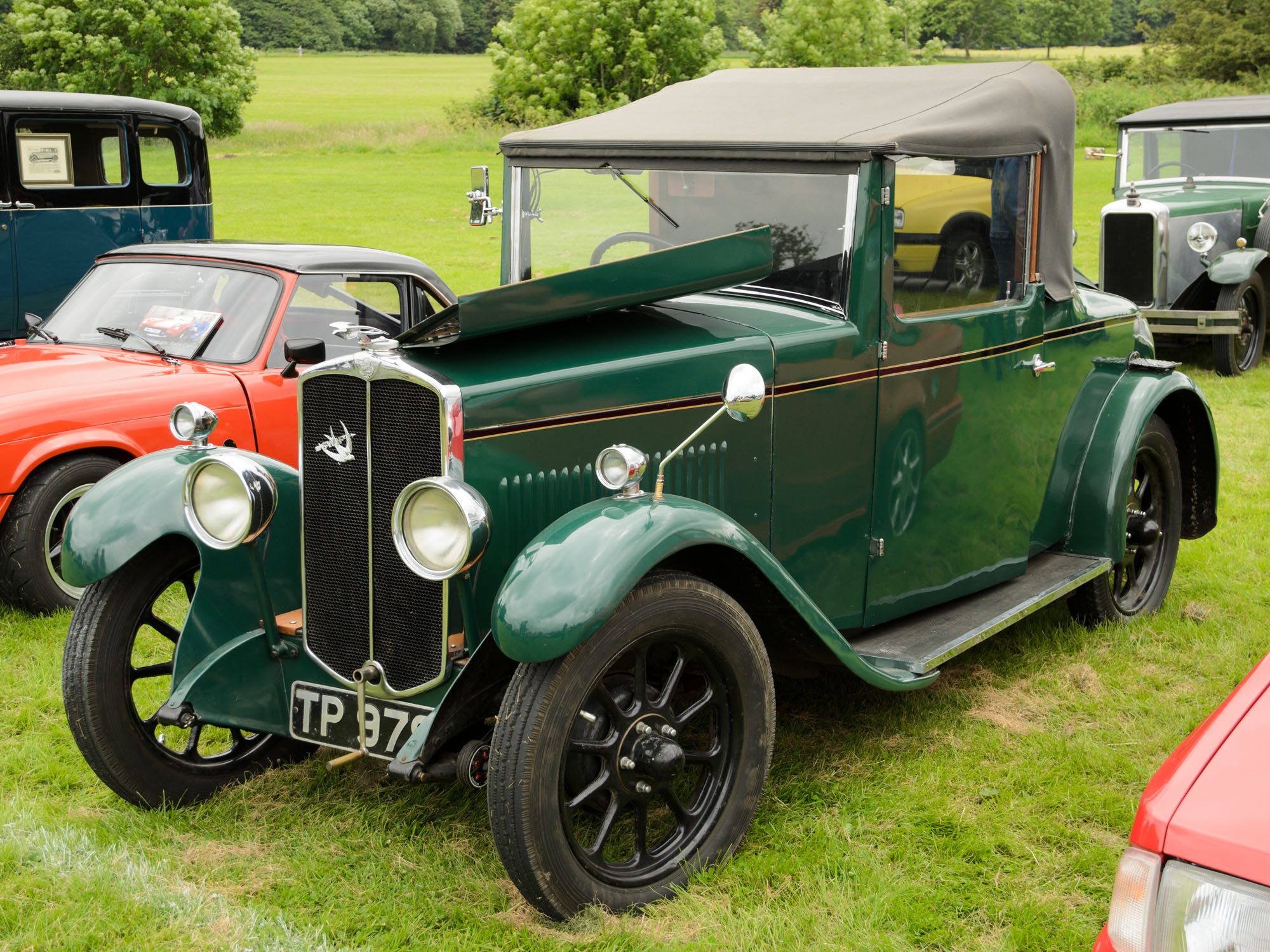
A Swift motor car, similar to the one that Gordon Parry allegedly took to a garage to be hosed down, inside and out, late on the night of the murder.

Roger Wilkes, an independent radio news editor, investigated the case for a radio programme to be broadcast on the fiftieth anniversary of the crime in early 1981. Wilkes learned that Goodman's suspect, a man named Richard Gordon Parry, had given police an alibi for the time of Julia's murder – presumed to be from Lily Lloyd, the woman to whom he was engaged. However, after Wallace's death and after being jilted by Parry, Lloyd allegedly offered to swear to Wallace's solicitor that the alibi had been false. Wilkes also discovered that, on the night of the murder, Parry had visited a local garage where he had used a high-pressure hose to wash down his car. A mechanic at the garage had noticed that one of his gloves was soaked in blood. Wilkes attempted to track down Parry, only to learn that he had died a few months previously. At the time Goodman's book was published, Parry had retired to a remote village in North Wales, where he was known as "Dick Parry", working part-time as a hospital telephone-switchboard operator.

In 1931, Parry, then aged 22, was a spoilt young man who sustained a lavish lifestyle by spending recklessly. Wilkes claims that Parry knew that Wallace's insurance takings for the day would have been in a cash box at his home. He was familiar with Wallace's house and his habits, having assisted the older man in his collections in 1928 and 1929. Since he also personally knew Wallace's wife, it would have been no trouble to visit her on some pretext once Wallace had been lured out of the house by means of the phone call sending him to a non-existent address. Julia's murder for the insurance takings that night was somewhat in vain as there was very little in the cash box, since Wallace had been ill during the previous week. The son of the detective sergeant on the case confirmed to Wilkes that Parry was interviewed by police as "the prime suspect", and that his house and car were "turned over", but he appeared to have an "unshakeable" alibi for the time of the crime. Wilkes went ahead and named Parry in his radio programme, and later spelled out his case in a book called Wallace: The Final Verdict.

The case against Parry is much stronger than that against Wallace and ascribes a more convincing motive. There was witness evidence of a blood-stained glove found in Parry's car on the night of the murder when he took his car to the garage for cleaning. The evidence from the man who cleaned the car was suppressed by police at the time. Wilkes argues that there was, moreover, no motive or reason for Wallace to kill his own wife, and that he was charged because the immense publicity surrounding the case impelled police to get a conviction at any cost. Parry died in 1980 without admitting any involvement in the crime. However, when Goodman and his friend Richard Whittington-Egan confronted him on his London doorstep in 1966, Parry displayed an astonishingly detailed knowledge of the case and was aware of the deaths of several obscure witnesses connected with it. He also boasted that he would never talk about it, "not if you were to offer me £2,000" (an amount equivalent to £32,532 in 2025).

Parry may have been suspected long before Goodman or Wilkes began their investigations. In 1934 author Winifred Duke made an oblique reference to the name of the killer as 'Harris', a common Welsh surname which is a cognate of Parry. Hargrave Lee Adam had also referred to the killer as "Mr. P" in his 1932 book.

=== James Murphy, 2001 ===
While adopting a stance that Wallace was guilty of the crime, The Murder of Julia Wallace by James Murphy did introduce two new facts to the case. The first was that Julia was actually seventeen years older than William, and had romanticized her origins. More importantly, for the first time, the police statements of Parry and his associates came into the public domain. It was apparent that, contrary to Wilkes' assumption, Parry's alibi for the time of the murder did not depend at all on Lloyd's testimony. A woman named Olivia Brine swore that Parry and others were at her house from 5:30 pm to 8:30 pm on the evening of the murder. If true, it would have been impossible for Parry to have killed Mrs. Wallace.

=== P. D. James, 2013 ===
Writing in The Sunday Times Magazine in October 2013, P. D. James refers to the conclusions of Goodman and Wilkes, but speculates that Parry made the "Qualtrough" call as a practical joke in retaliation for Wallace's having reported Parry to their employers for dishonesty. She concludes that Wallace did in fact murder his wife and speculates that the murder weapon was an iron poker with which Wallace struck his victim, having first stripped and covered himself with the mackintosh found at the scene, spattered with Julia's blood, and that it was entirely possible for him to have done so within a reconstructed timeline of the events of that evening. She believes that "in the end justice was done, if only the fallible justice of men". This reading of the evidence must, however, be set against the fact that Wallace probably never reported his experience of Parry's dishonesty to their mutual employer and that Parry was not formally dismissed either at the time, or later. There is no evidence that Wallace attempted to use this information to coerce or blackmail Parry.

=== Antony M. Brown, 2018 ===
Author Antony M. Brown surveyed all the published theories, both evidentially and logically, in his 2018 book Move to Murder, before concluding that, on balance, a previously unpublished theory "is the best explanation for one of the most puzzling murder cases in British criminal history." The new theory, first posited in 2008 by Merseyside-based researcher Rod Stringer, holds that Parry was indeed the brains behind a distraction burglary, which turned to murder when his unknown accomplice was confronted by Julia after rifling the cash box—after first gaining entry to Wolverton Street on the pretext he was “Qualtrough”.

== Quotes ==
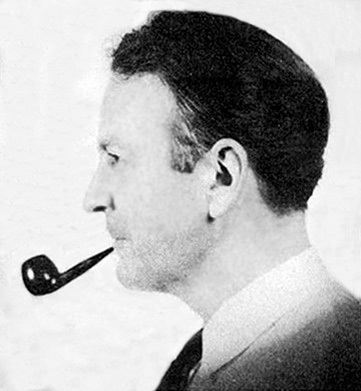
"The impossible murder"; "Wallace couldn’t have done it, and neither could anyone else"; "the Wallace case is unbeatable; it will always be unbeatable". Raymond Chandler

- "This murder, I should imagine, must be almost unexampled in the annals of crime ... murder so devised and arranged that nothing remains which will point to anyone as the murderer." (Mr. Justice Wright, summing-up in R v Wallace)
- "The Wallace murder had no key-move and ended, in fact, in stalemate." (Dorothy L. Sayers in The Anatomy of Murder)
- "It was planned with extreme care and extraordinary imagination. Either the murderer was Wallace or it wasn’t. If it wasn't, then here at last is the perfect murder." (James Agate in Ego 6)
- "Almost every fact in the evidence was accepted by both prosecution and defence; but every fact could be interpreted in two ways." (John Rowland in The Wallace Case)
- "Whoever killed Mrs Wallace attained a distinction accorded to few murderers. His was the perfect crime, undetected, unexplained, motiveless, unavenged." (Winifred Duke in Six Trials)
- "The case began to assume the unique character for which it is famous; it was not so much that the weight of the evidence swung evenly from one side to the other, it was that the entire evidence pointed equally convincingly in both directions." (F. Tennyson Jesse in Checkmate)
- "The Wallace case is more than a classic, it is the classic of criminology." (John Brophy in The Meaning of Murder)
- "... as a mental exercise, as a challenge to one’s powers of deduction and analysis, the Wallace murder is in a class by itself. It has all the maddening, frustrating fascination of a chess problem that ends in perpetual check. ... Any set of circumstances that is extracted from it will readily support two incompatible hypotheses; they will be equally consistent with innocence and guilt. It is pre-eminently the case where everything is cancelled out by something else." (Edgar Lustgarten in Verdict in Dispute)
- "The Wallace case is the nonpareil of all murder mysteries ... I call it the impossible murder because Wallace couldn’t have done it, and neither could anyone else. ... The Wallace case is unbeatable; it will always be unbeatable." (Raymond Chandler, in Raymond Chandler Speaking)
- "Still unsolved, fascinating in its permutations, absolutely typical of the 1930s. Couldn't have happened at any other time, not in precisely the way it did happen... What is interesting is that the evidence, such as it was, could support either the prosecution or the defence depending on how you chose to look at it." (P. D. James in The Murder Room, through character Conrad Ackroyd).
- "The Wallace case of 1931 is regarded as the classic English whodunnit, a labyrinth of clues and false trails leading everywhere except, it seems, to the identity of the murderer... The setting is wintrily provincial, the milieu lower middle-class, the style threadbare domestic. J.B. Priestley's fog-filled Liverpool remembrance of "trams going whining down long sad roads" is the quintessence of it. Events turn tantalisingly on finical questions of time and distance; knuckle-headed police jostle with whistling street urchins for star billing, while at the centre of the drama stands the scrawny, inscrutable figure of the accused man, William Herbert Wallace, the Man from The Pru..." (Roger Wilkes, editor, The Mammoth Book of Unsolved Crimes, 2005)
- "... criminologists and crime writers are drawn to this tantalising whodunit like a fish to a brightly coloured lure." (Antony M. Brown, in Move To Murder)

== Fictional portrayals ==
Two novels were published shortly after Wallace's death, both suggesting that he may in fact have been guilty of the murder of his wife: The Jury Disagree by George Goodchild and C. E. Bechhofer Roberts and Skin for Skin by Winifred Duke. In 1978 Jonathan Goodman, who wrote a seminal factual investigation of the case, published a novel, The Last Sentence, with the crime setting transposed to London. The most recent treatment is in author Anthony Quinn's The Mouthless Dead, in which the murder is seen through the eyes of a fictional police inspector, reliving the crime as he prepares to write his memoirs.

The case was the basis for the BBC's 1990 Screen Two film The Man from the Pru, starring Jonathan Pryce as Wallace and Anna Massey as Julia.

== See also ==
- Miscarriages of justice
- List of unsolved deaths
