= List of endemic flora of Israel =

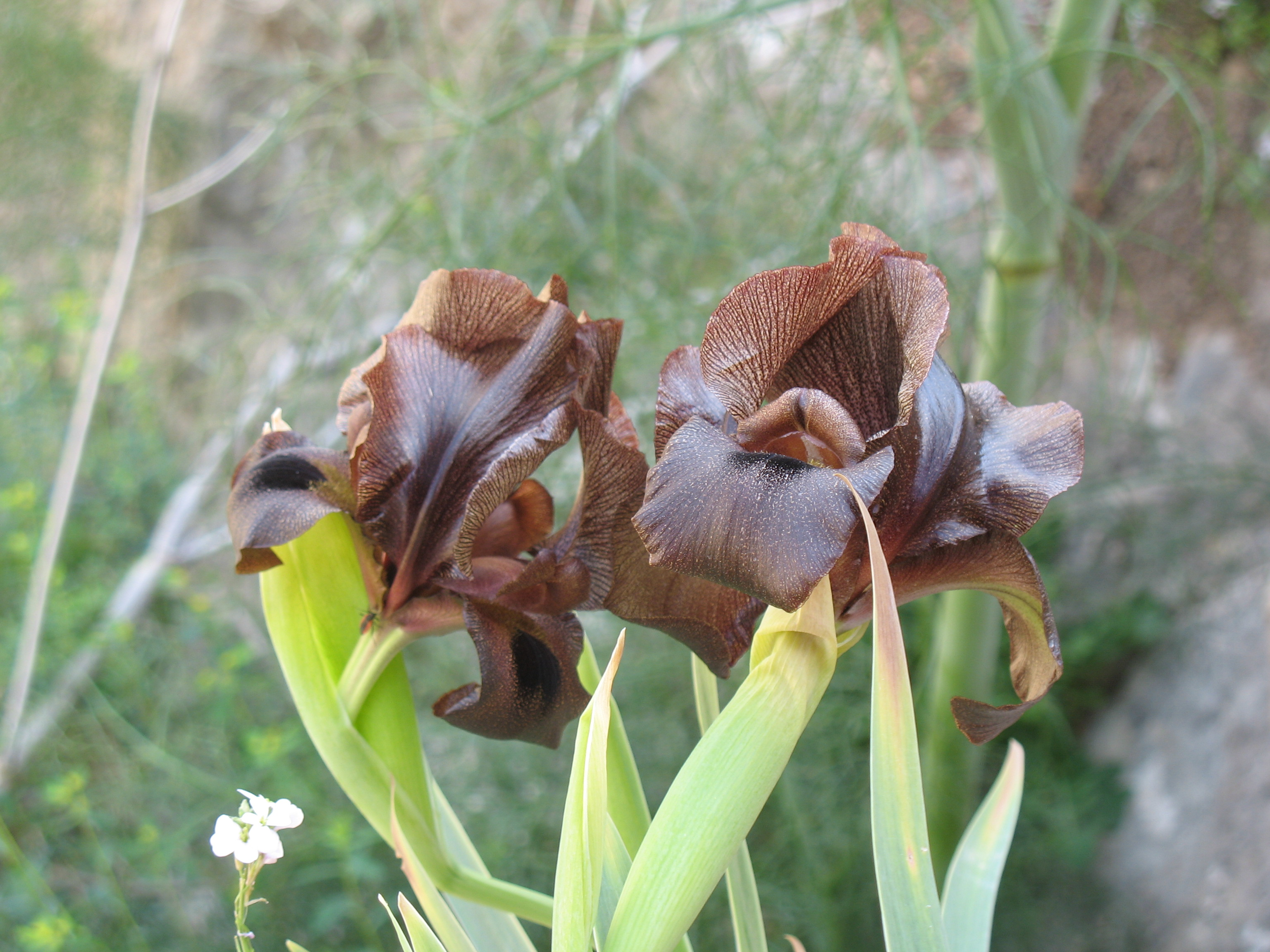
Iris atrofusca

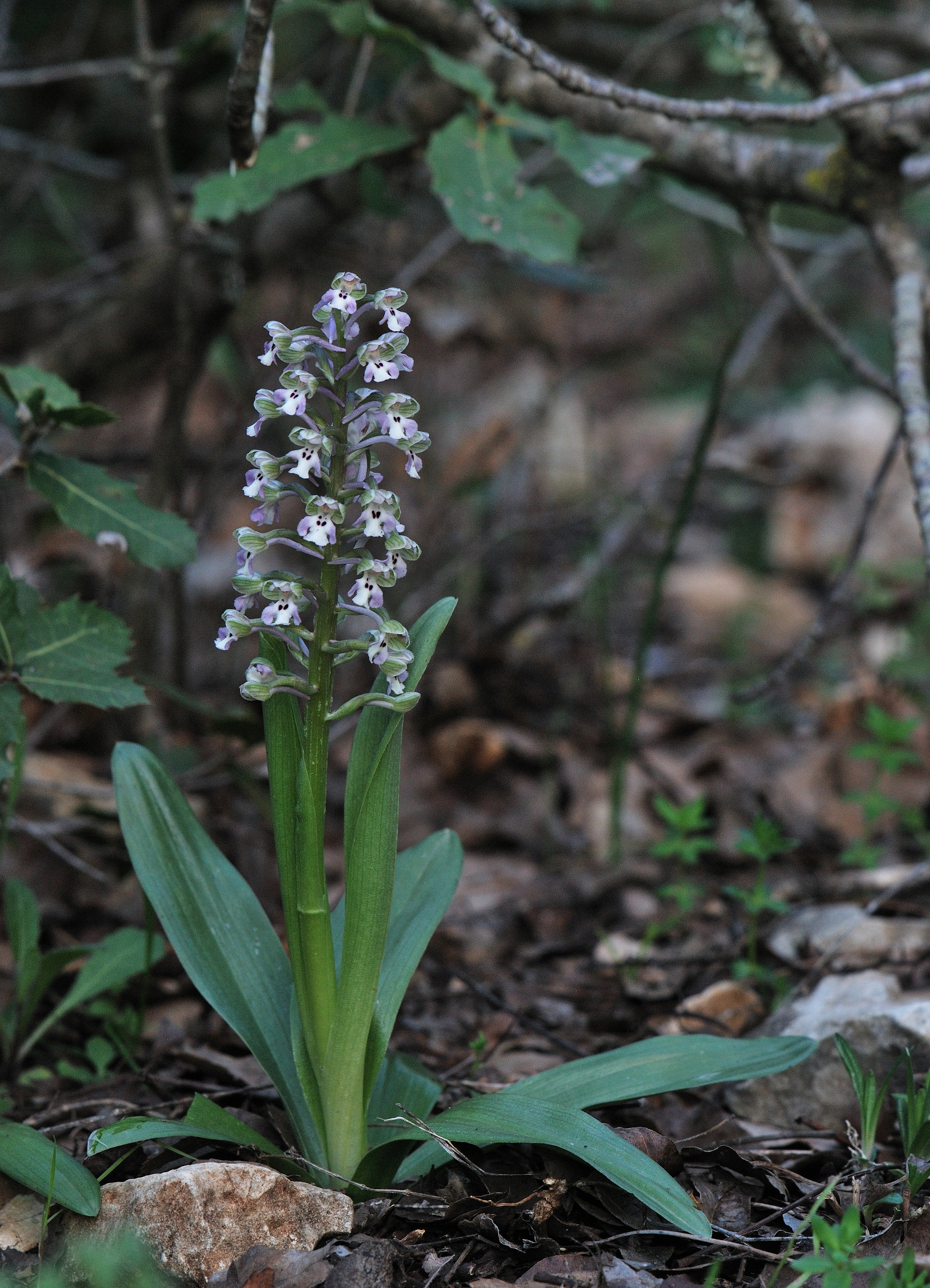
Anacamptis israelitica

List of endemic flora of Israel refers to flowers, plants and trees endemic to Israel/Palestine.

- Allium akirense
- Allium dumetorum
- Allium tardiflorum
- Anacamptis israelitica
- Anthemis brachycarpa
- Crypsis minuartioides
- Echinops philistaeus
- Erodium subintegrifolium
- Ferula samariae
- Galium philistaeum
- Iris atrofusca
- Iris atropurpurea
- Paronychia palaestina
- Rumex aeroplaniformis
- Scandix blepharicarpa
- Silene telavivensis
- Tamarix negevensis

== See also ==
- Jerusalem Botanical Gardens
- List of native plants of Palestine (A-B)
- Wildlife of Israel
- Wild edible plants of Israel / Palestine
