= Allium akirense =

Conservation status
- Critically Endangered (IUCN 3.1)

Scientific classification
- Kingdom: Plantae
- Clade: Embryophytes
- Clade: Tracheophytes
- Clade: Spermatophytes
- Clade: Angiosperms
- Clade: Monocots
- Order: Asparagales
- Family: Amaryllidaceae
- Subfamily: Allioideae
- Genus: Allium
- Species: A. akirense

Binomial name
- Allium akirense Friesen and Fragman-Sapir

Species of flowering plant

Allium akirense is a species of flowering plant in the family Amaryllidaceae endemic to Israel. Is it closely related to Allium qasyunense. It is diploid having 14 chromosomes.

== Etymology ==
The name "akirense" derives from the Biblical Hebrew word "Ekron" and the Arabic word "Akir", both referring to the area where the species is found.

== Description ==
Allium akirense roots are between 10–15 cm long. Its stem is erect, cylindrical, smooth and between 15 and 50 cm tall. It also have green, dry leaves that are linear and flat between 12 and 40 cm and 1–3 mm wide. The leaves narrow towards the tip. Its ovary is yellow and sub-cylindrical.

== Distribution and habitat ==
This species is exclusively found on the coast of Israel, 25 km south of Tel Aviv, The plain is densely settled and a lot of agriculture and cultivation occurs there. The original distribution of the species is unknown. It is estimated to occupy an area of around 8 km^{2}.

There are eight known sub-populations of Allium akirense. Three of them have hundreds of individuals, while the other five only have a few.

== Conservation ==
It is list as critically endangered by IUCN with a decreasing population trend. It is believed that there are only about 3,000 mature individuals left.

=== Threats ===
Urban and industrial development poses a serious threat to the species. They are also threatened by agriculture of non-timber crops which has caused stress on the local ecosystem.

=== Conservation ===
Although this species is critically endangered, the species is not in protected areas. They are currently under ex-situ conservation at the Jerusalem Botanical Gardens.

== See also ==
- Flora of Israel
- List of critically endangered plants
