= Desertarium =

Desertarium (a portmanteau, "desert" + "terrarium") may refer to:

- Desertarium, a vivarium housing plants and animals native to arid and low-humidity environments
- Midbarium, Israeli desert zoo and park
- Part of the High Desert Museum, Oregon, United States
