= Negev Zoo =

The Zoological Garden of Beersheba ("NegevZoo")
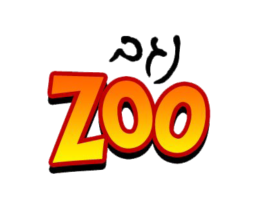

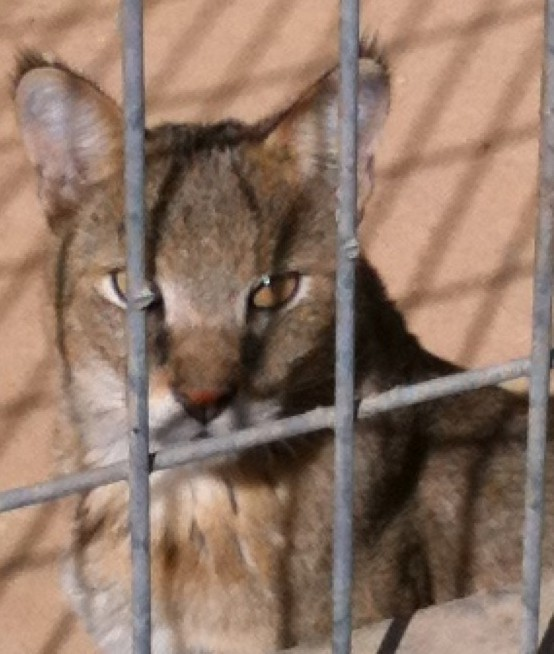
- Interactive map of The Zoological Garden of Beersheba ("NegevZoo")
- 31.26°N 34.745°E
- Location: Beersheba, Israel
- Land area: 50 dunams (5.0 ha; 12 acres) (as of 2018)
- No. of species: 150
- Website: http://negevzoo.co.il/

Negev Zoo (Zoological Garden of Beersheba) was a desert zoo near the west entrance of Beersheba, Israel.

The zoo's area is 50 dunams (1 hectare or 2.5 acres). It has a collection of mammalians, birds and reptiles of which the ungulates, turtles, snakes and lizards are especially notable.

== History ==
The zoo was established in 1954 as a petting zoo of the nearby school. Little by little it got support from the city of Beersheba, the Israeli Ministry of Education, the Housing and Construction Minister of Israel and private contributors, it moved from place to place in the town, and finally was made a formal zoo.

In 1983 Prof. R. Yagil started a funding Campaign to fund a new location for the Zoo, in 1985 the Zoo had moved to the location where Ma'abarat Hazerim had been previously located, and was officially opened in 1985. The transfer was to a 1,000 m^{2} (11,000 sq ft) area. Most of the work was done by volunteers.

In 1991 with the establishment of Neve Ze'ev the zoo was moved to Kiryat Meir Batz and reopened in 1996.

In 2011 the zoo had moved to be operated by the Be'er Sheva city hall, and since then it is operated by the Kivunim corporation which is owned by the Be'er sheva city hall.

In 2017, Negev zoo was expected to receive a pair of lions Three white lions had arrived from the Sóstó Zoo, Hungary (one male and two females).

In 2022, the zoo was closed, cages demolished. In 2023 in its place the Midbarium ("desertarium", desert park and zoo) was established.

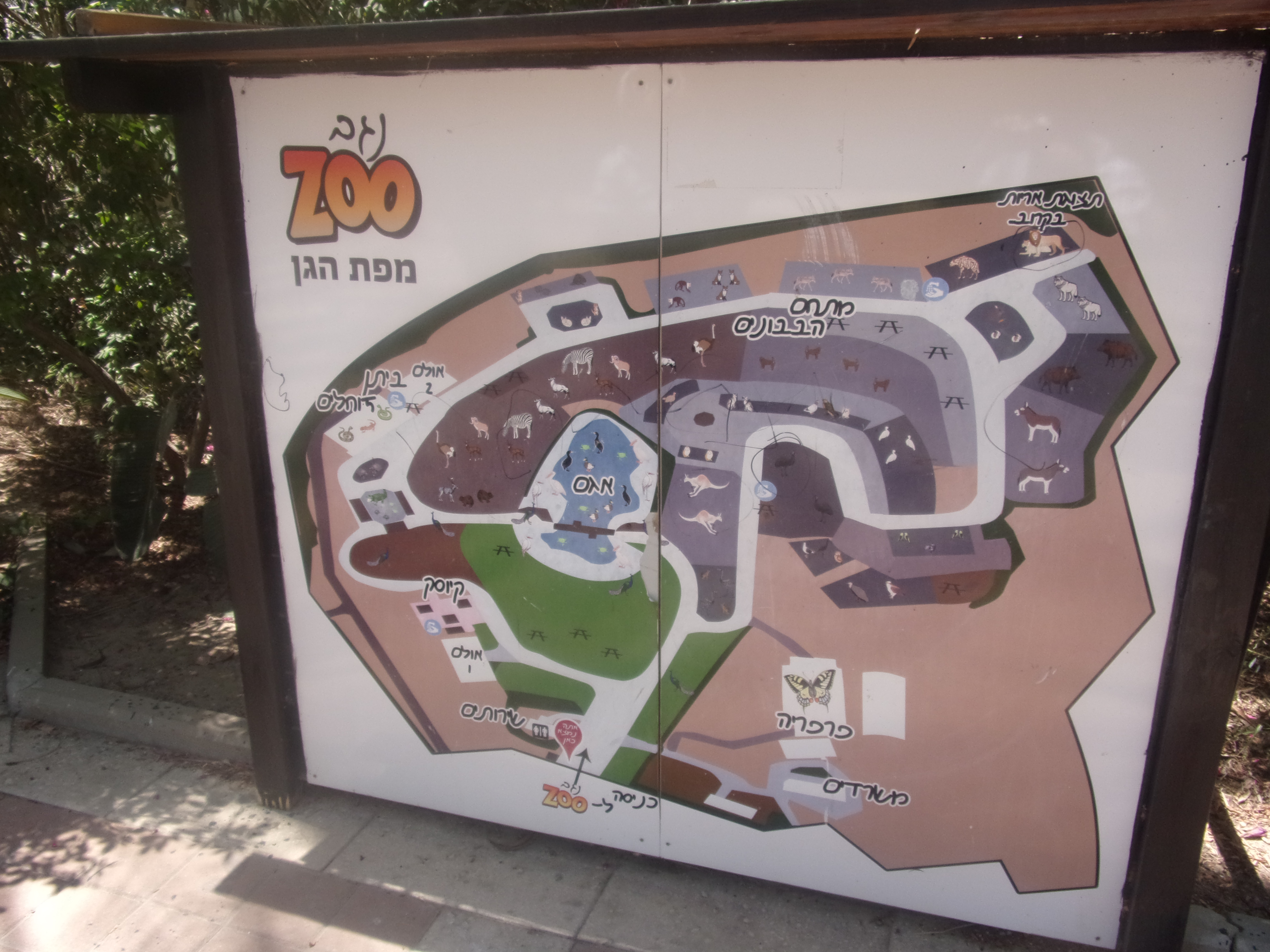
Negev zoo map

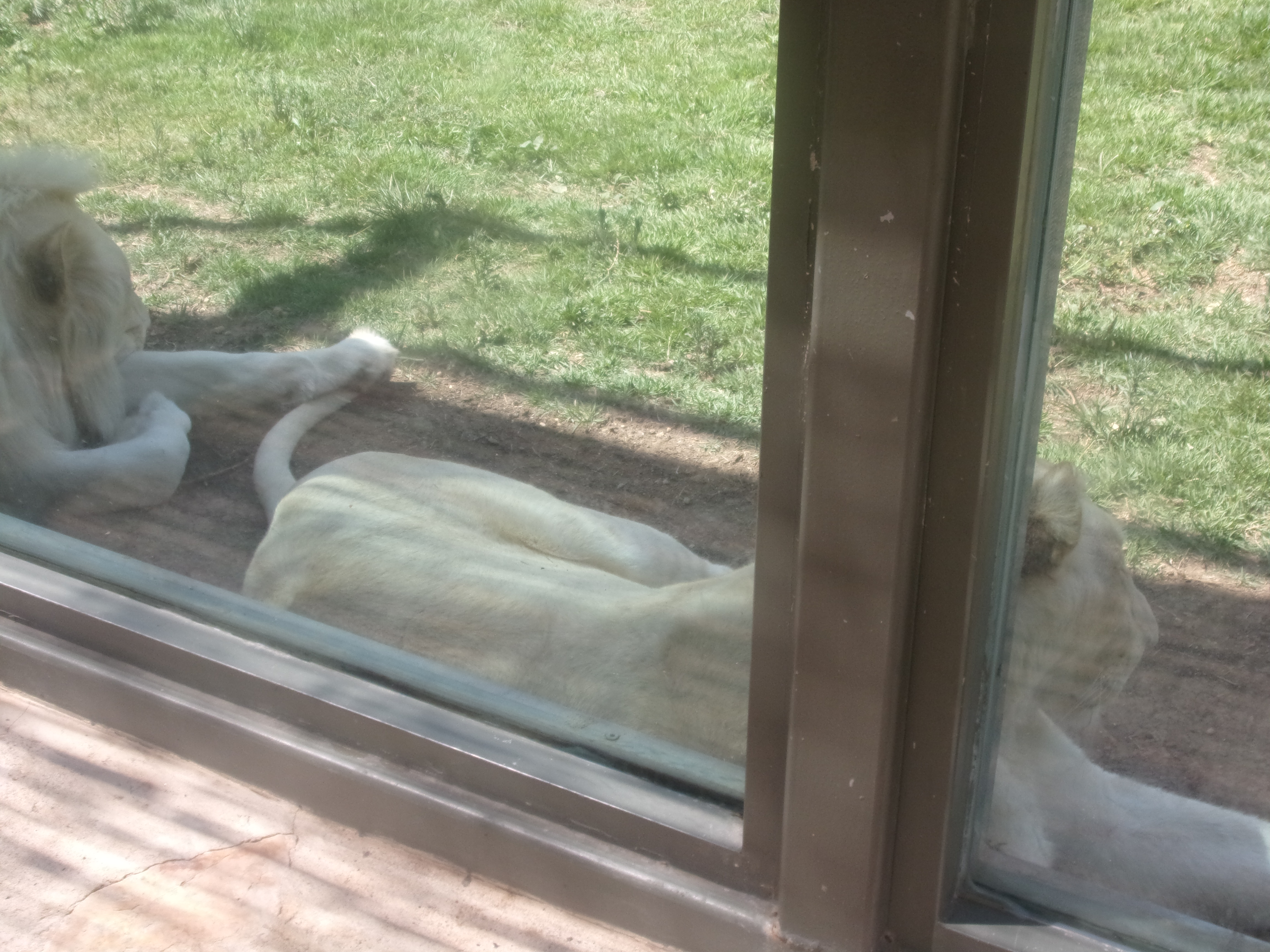
White lions at NegevZoo

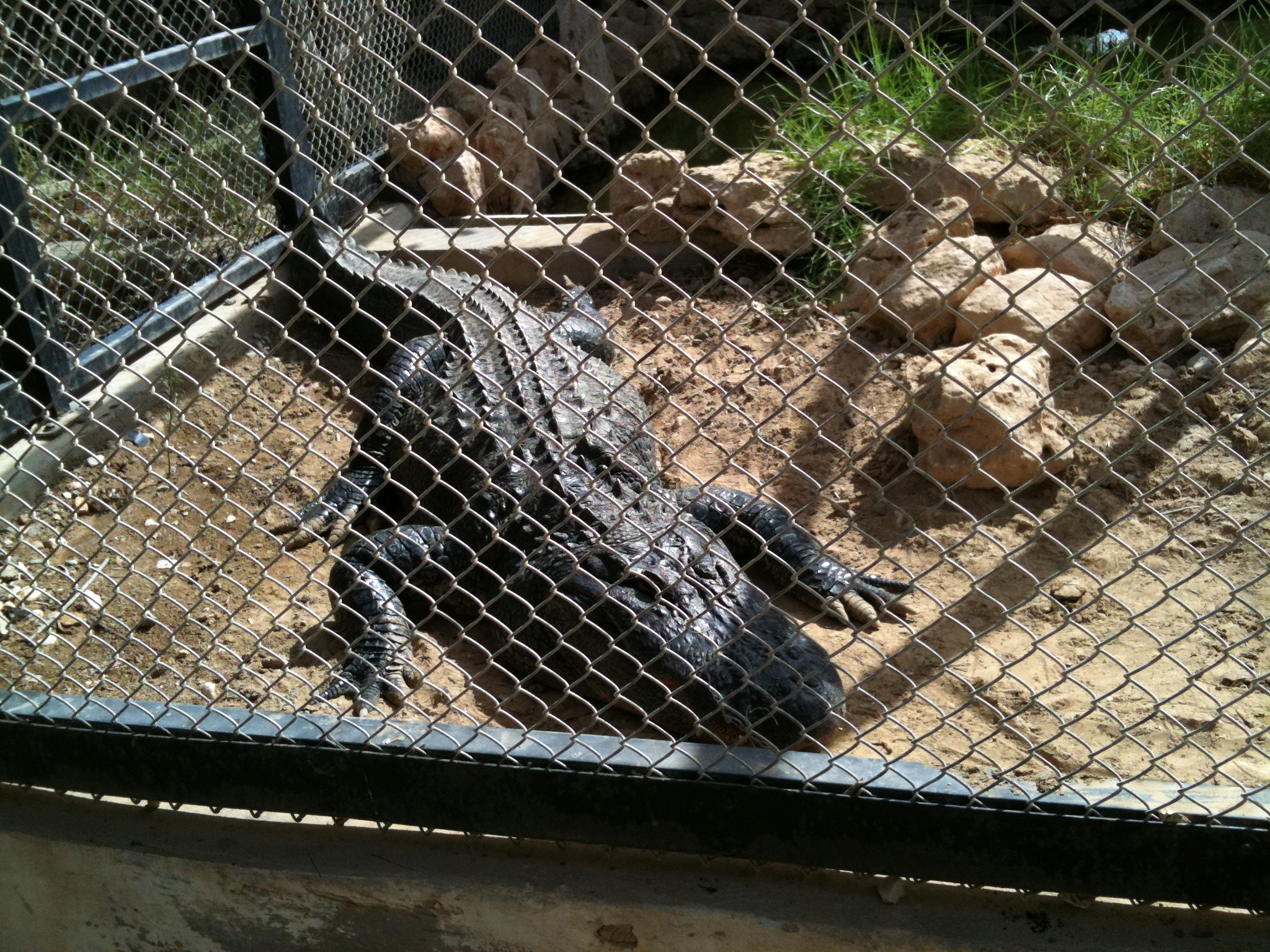
American alligator

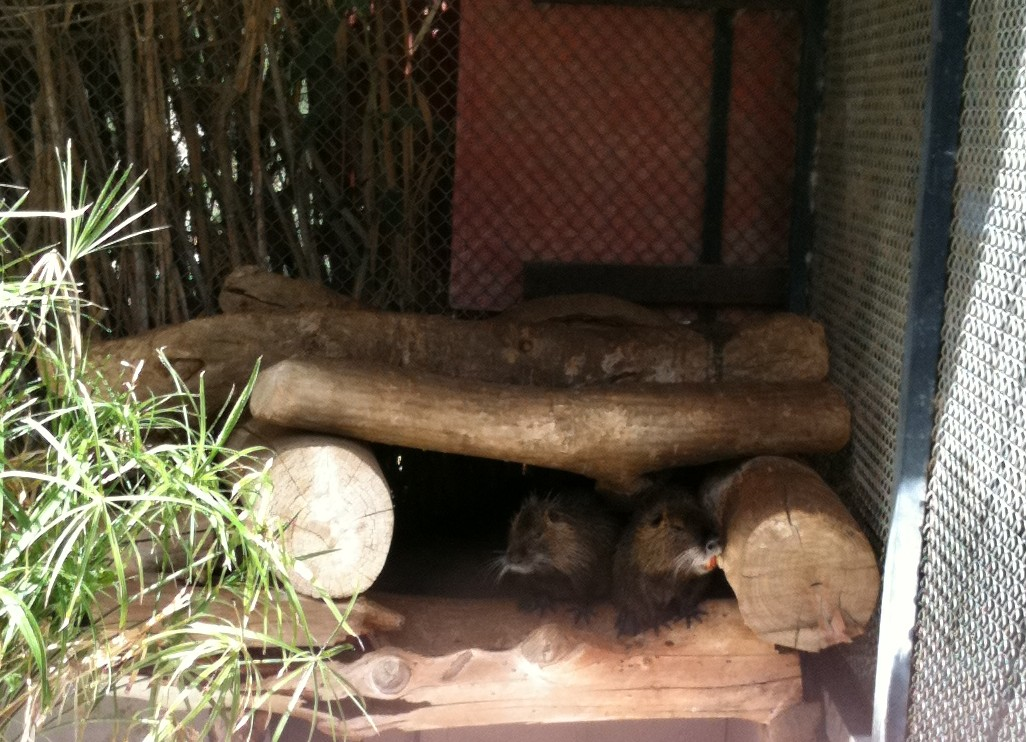
Nutria at NegevZoo

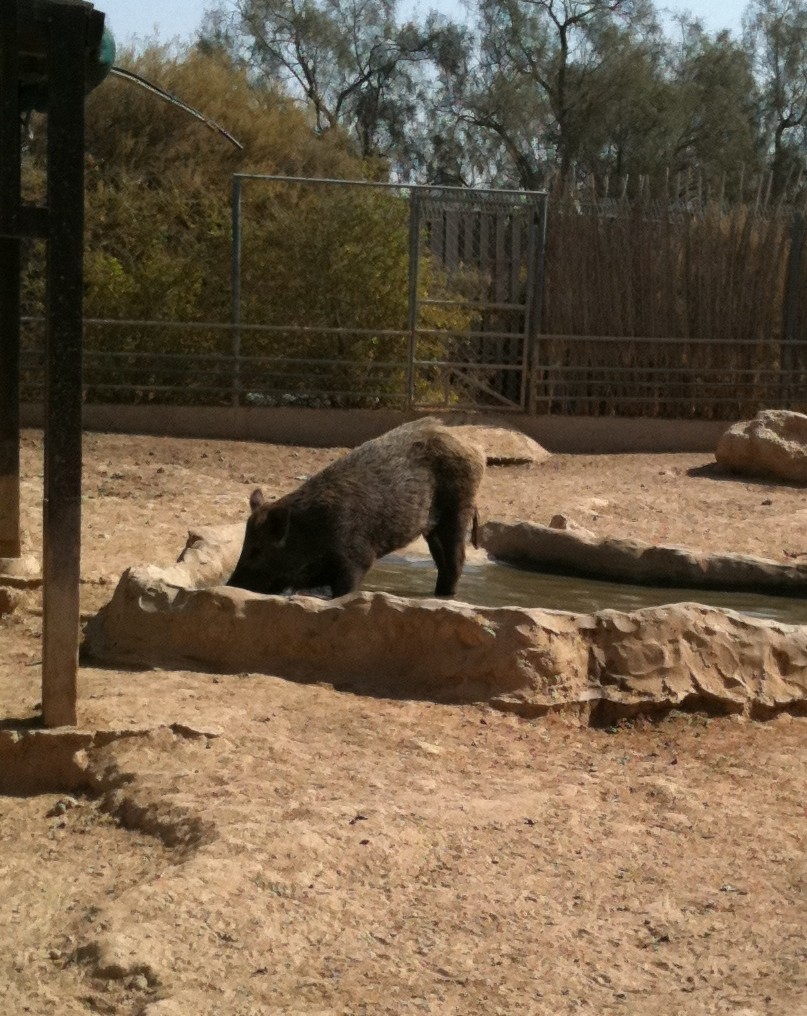
Boars at NegevZoo

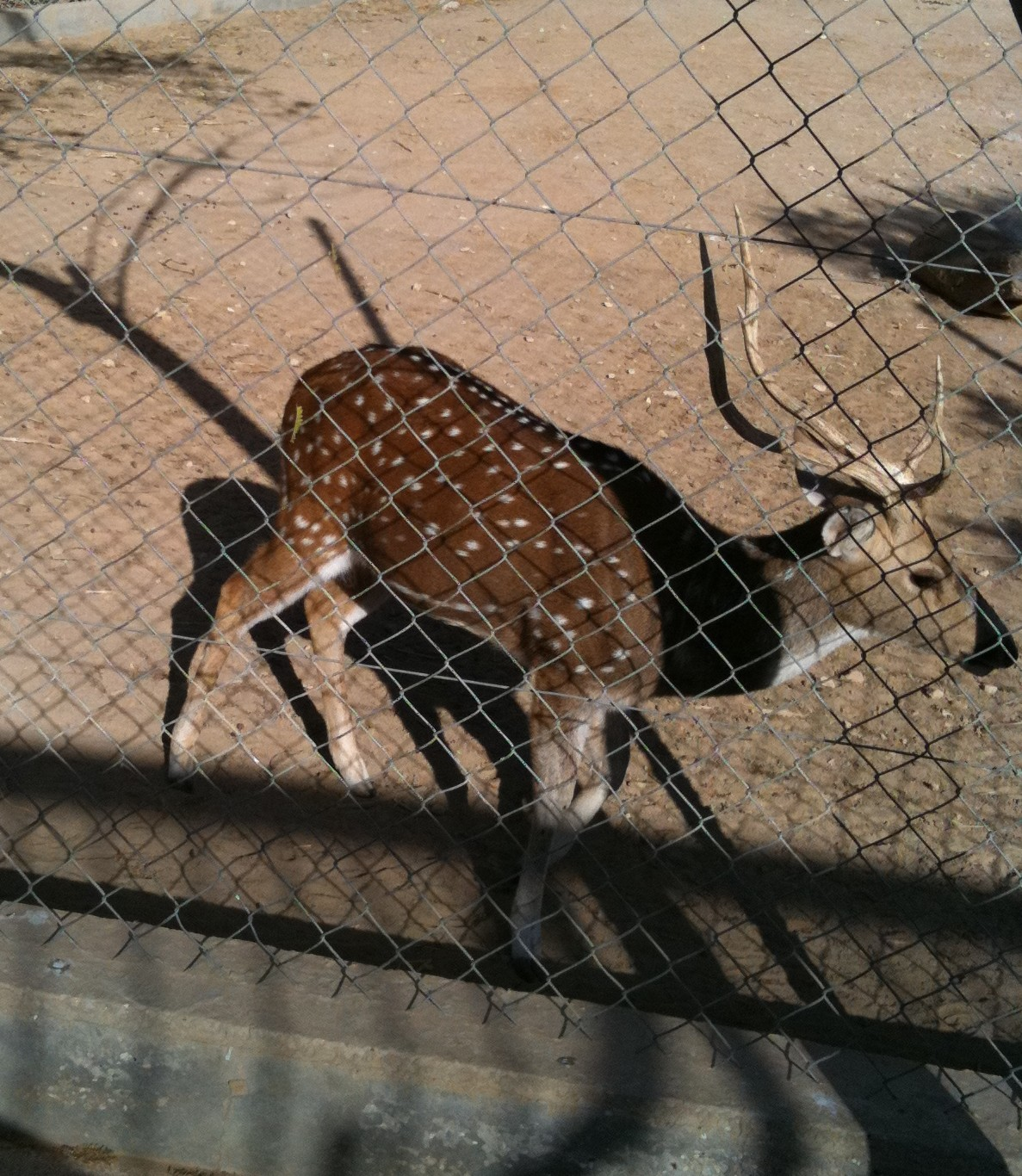

== See also ==
- Wildlife of Israel
