= Midbarium =

Zoo in Beersheba, Israel

Coordinates: 31°15′39″N 34°44′47″E

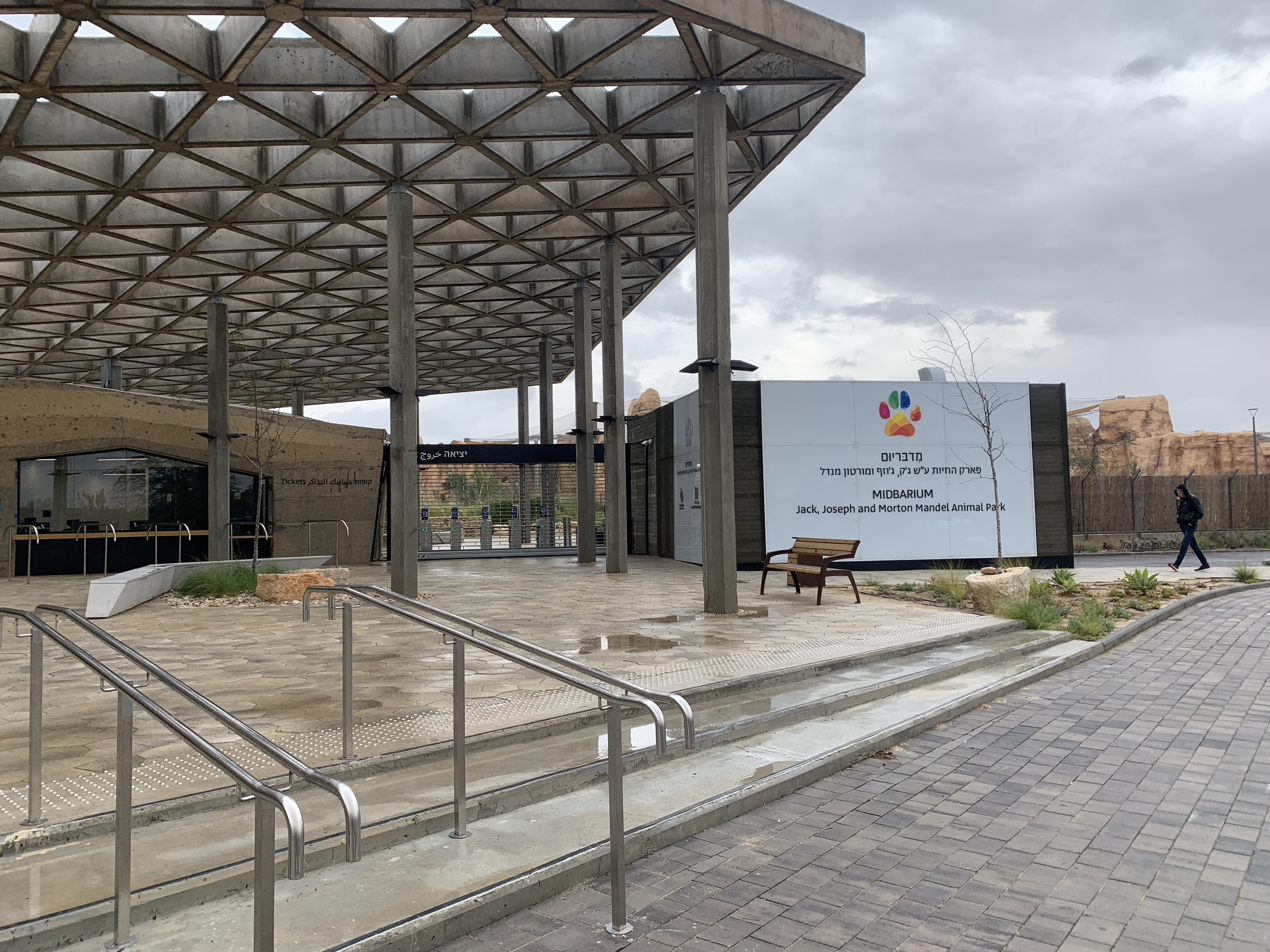
Midbarium entrance

The Midbarium or "Desertarium" (Hebrew: מדבריום; "midbar" means "desert" is Hebrew), also the Jack, Joseph, and Morton Mandel Animal Park is a desert zoo and amusement park at the edge of the desert by the northwest outskirts of Beersheba, Israel. It covers 140 dunams (37 acres) and has over 100 species of animals, including leopards, zebras, giraffes, turtles, wild dogs, hippopotami, meerkats, lions, and eagles.

It was established in 2024, in place of Negev Zoo, which was demolished in 2022, and is managed by the same company, Kivunim. Since August 2024 its director is Yuval Lavi, replacing Ziv Reshef. Many animals for Midbarium came from Negev Zoo, as well as from other places.

The park features a number of interactive features for visitors to have a feel of the experience of an animals: to "see like a raptor", ride high in an elevator to look around from the height of a giraffe, hunt like a crocodile, and move in the dark using echolocation like a bat.

== See also ==
- Wildlife of Israel
