= List of bats of Israel =

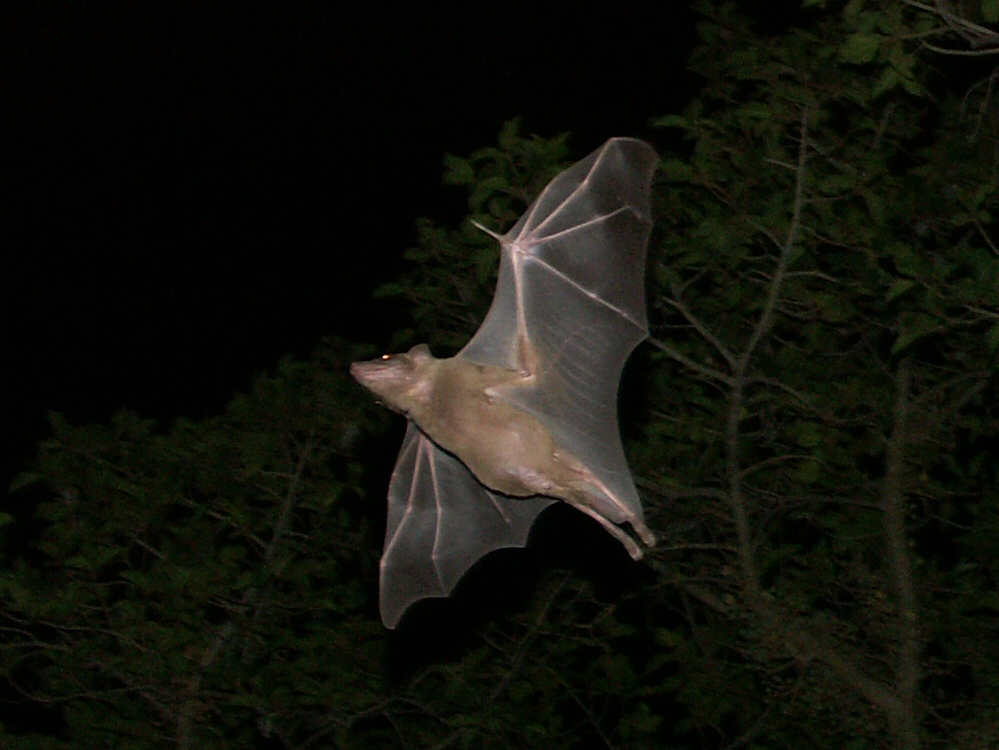
The most common bat in Tel Aviv, according to one report, is the Egyptian fruit bat, Rousettus aegyptiacus.

To date, thirty-three species of Israeli bats have been identified, of which 32 are insectivorous.

The largest bat hibernation site in Israel is the Twins Cave near Beit Shemesh.

One-third of the species of bats of Israel are found in the Jordan Valley region, with many inhabiting abandoned Israeli military outposts along the border with Jordan.

Beginning in the 1950s, bat caves in Israel were routinely fumigated to reduce the number of fruit bats in the country. As the population of fruit bats declined, so did that of other bat species. Consequently, the number of noctuid moths soared, resulting in extensive damage to crops.

== Bat caves ==
The largest bat hibernation site in Israel is the Twins Cave, south of Beit Shemesh. The cave is a karstic formation measuring 50m x 70m and takes its name from a local Arab legend about a woman who drank from a spring in the cave and subsequently gave birth to a pair of twins. The cave forms part of the Twins Cave Nature Reserve.

== List of bats of Israel ==
=== Insectivorous bats ===
- Asellia tridens
- Pipistrellus kuhlii
- Rhinolophus hipposideros
- Tadarida teniotis
- Rhinopoma hardwickei
- Rhinopoma microphyllum
- Eptesicus serotinus
- Miniopterus schreibersii
- Myotis blythii
- Myotis capaccinii
- Myotis emarginatus
- Myotis myotis
- Myotis mystacinus
- Myotis nattereri
- Nyctalus noctula
- Pipistrellus pipistrellus
- Pipistrellus savii
- Rhinolophus blasii
- Rhinolophus euryale
- Rhinolophus ferrumequinum
- Taphozous nudiventris
- Barbastella leucomelas
- Eptesicus bottae
- Nycteris thebaica
- Otonycteris hemprichii
- Pipistrellus bodenheimeri
- Pipistrellus rueppellii
- Plecotus austriacus
- Rhinolophus clivosus
- Taphozous perforatus

=== Fruit bats ===
- Rousettus aegyptiacus

== See also ==
- Wildlife of Israel
