= Allium qasyunense =

Scientific classification
- Kingdom: Plantae
- Clade: Tracheophytes
- Clade: Angiosperms
- Clade: Monocots
- Order: Asparagales
- Family: Amaryllidaceae
- Subfamily: Allioideae
- Genus: Allium
- Species: A. qasyunense

Binomial name
- Allium qasyunense Mouterde

Species of flowering plant

Allium qasyunense is a Middle Eastern species of onions in the amaryllis family, found in Israel, Palestine, Syria and Jordan. It is a bulb-forming perennial with an umbel of cream-colored flowers.
