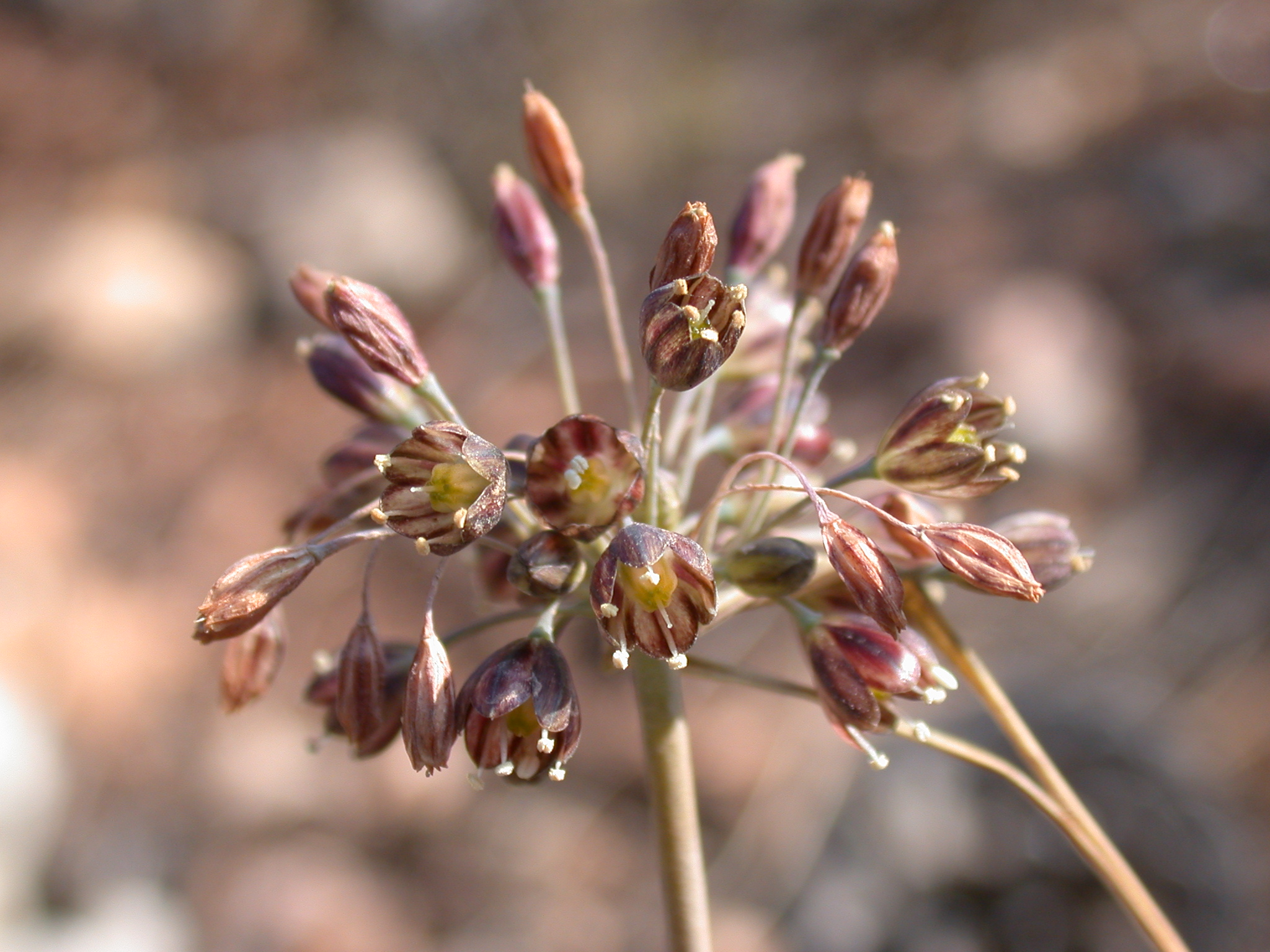
- Allium tardiflorum found at Mount Carmel, Israel

Scientific classification
- Kingdom: Plantae
- Clade: Tracheophytes
- Clade: Angiosperms
- Clade: Monocots
- Order: Asparagales
- Family: Amaryllidaceae
- Subfamily: Allioideae
- Genus: Allium
- Species: A. tardiflorum

Binomial name
- Allium tardiflorum F.Kollmann & Shmida

= Allium tardiflorum =

Species of flowering plant

Allium tardiflorum is a plant species found in Israel. It is a bulb-forming perennial producing an umbel of flowers late in the season, in September or October. Flowers are on long pedicels, forming a lax umbel. Tepals are green with purple midveins and purple margins.
