= Wildlife of Israel =

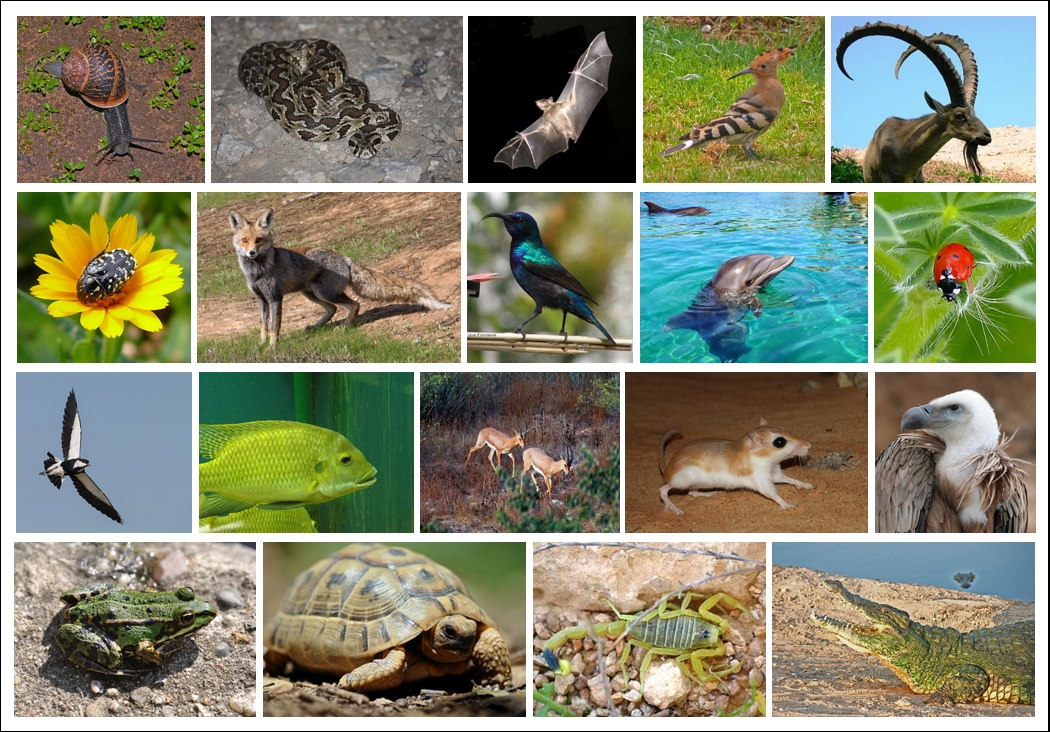
Animals of Israel

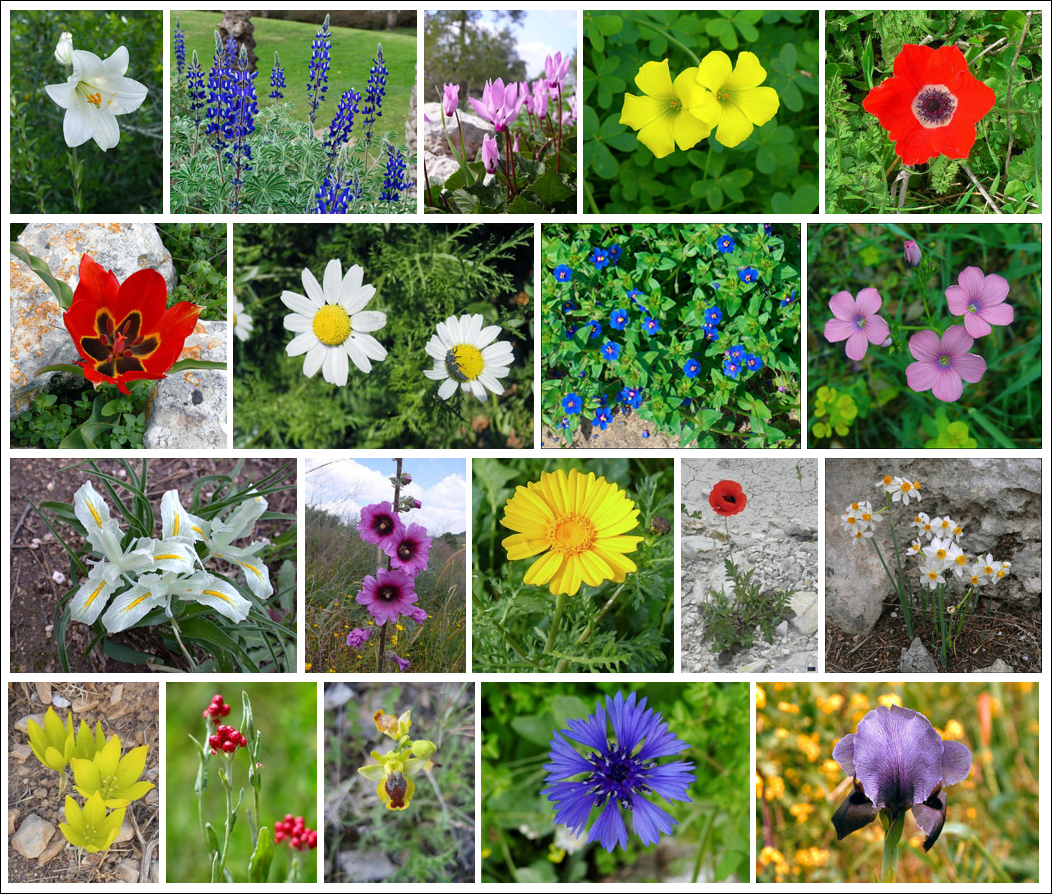
Flowers of Israel

The wildlife of Israel includes the flora and fauna of Israel, which is extremely diverse due to the country's location between the temperate and the tropical zones, bordering the Mediterranean Sea in the west and the desert in the east. Species such as the Syrian brown bear and the Arabian ostrich have become extinct in Israel because of their loss of habitat. As of May 2007, 190 nature reserves have been established in Israel.

== Fauna ==
=== Mammals ===
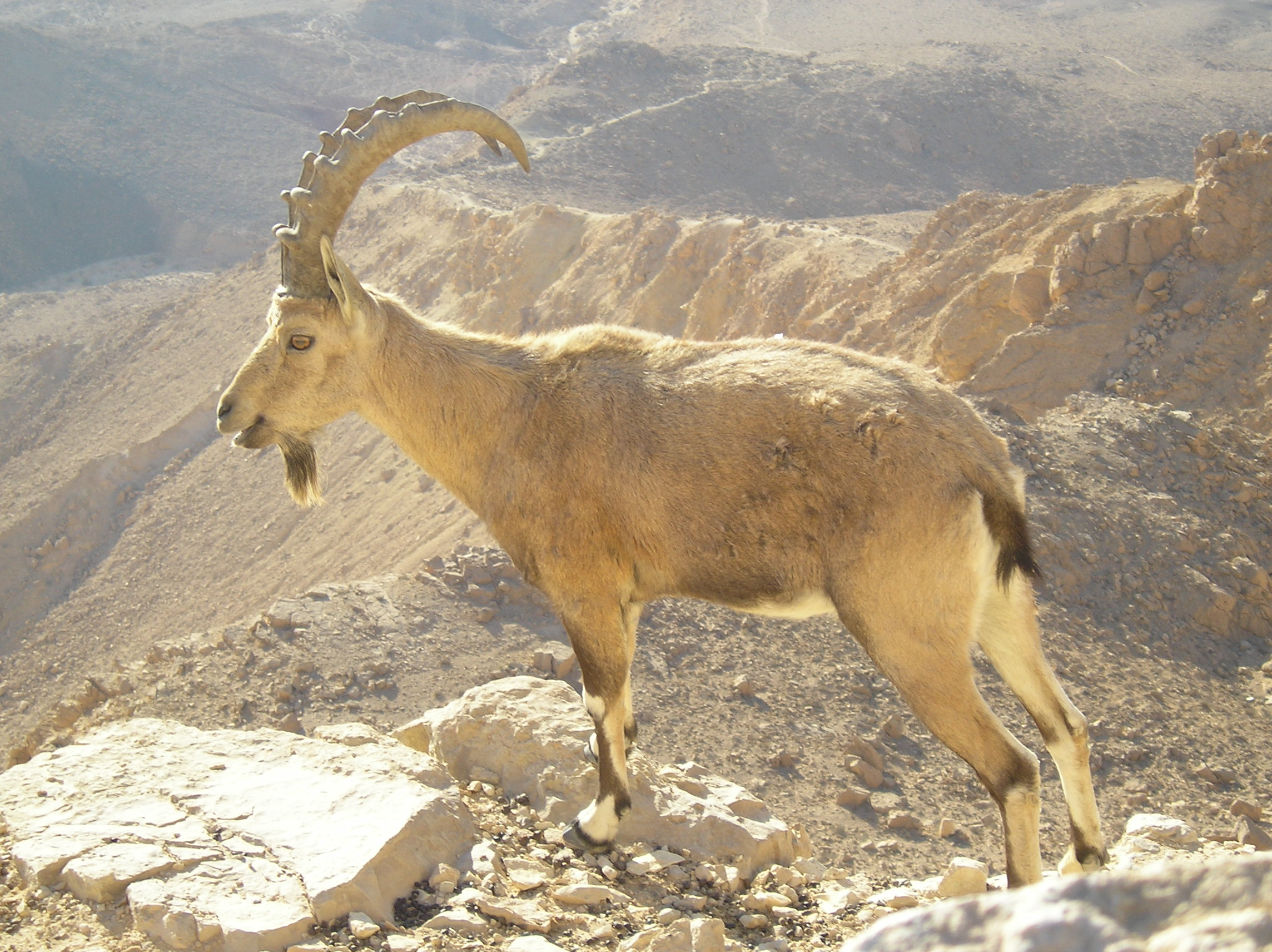
A Nubian ibex in the Negev desert

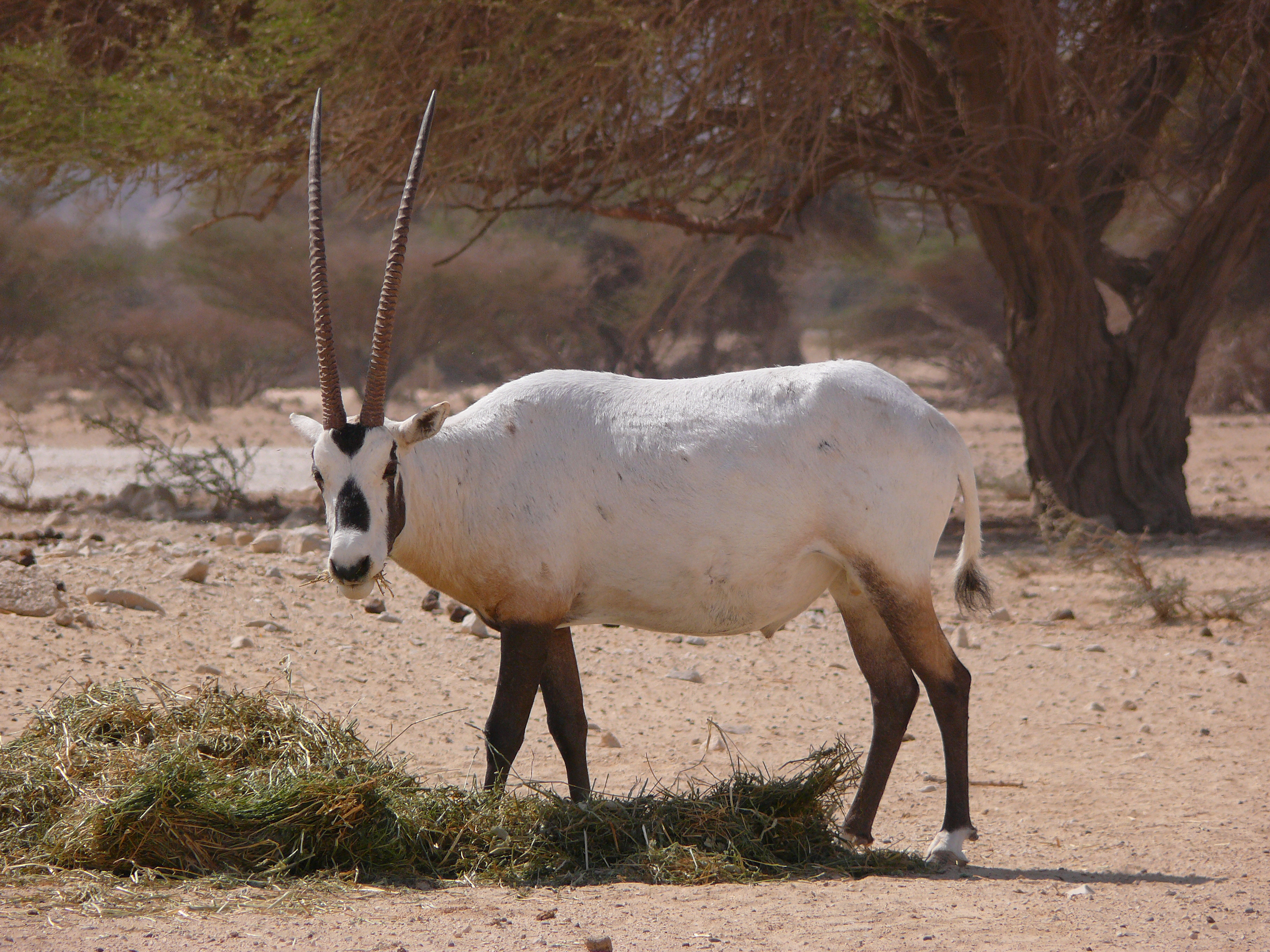
An Arabian oryx in the Yotvata wildlife reserve

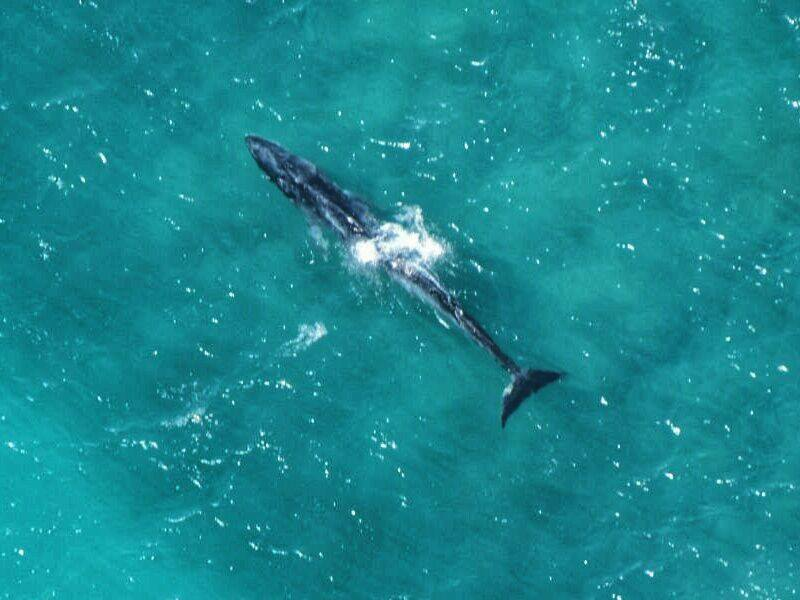
Fin whale in distress swims off national park of Caesarea Maritima

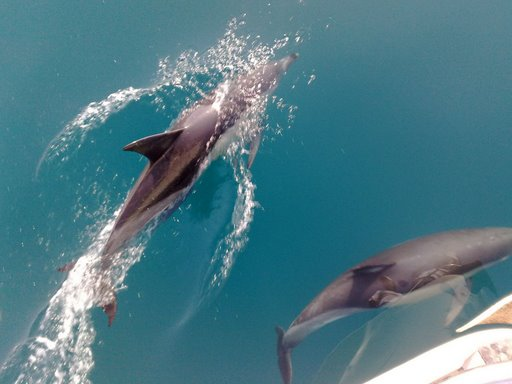
Short-beaked common dolphins bow-riding off Ashdod

Israel contains a variety of mammals due to its geographical and climatic diversity. For many of the mammals, Israel is the border of their territory. The territories of species which originate in the Palearctic generally stop at the deserts and those who originate from the African deserts usually stop at the Mediterranean coasts. Most of the mammals in Israel are of a Palearctic origin and about a tenth of the mammals are endemic to its general area. The land of Israel once contained a greater variety of mammals, however in recent times many mammals such as the European water vole, the Asiatic cheetah and the Caucasian squirrel went locally extinct. The largest predator in Israel was the Arabian leopard which is now also believed to be locally extinct due to the lack of sightings since 2011. In the modern age many mammal populations such as the sand cat are in a high risk of extinction. In total there are 57 species of mammals which are endangered (as of 2002) out of the total 104 species. There are 33 species of bats in Israel (as of 2002), the most species out of the ten mammalian orders currently in Israel, most of which are insect-eaters. Researchers from Tel Aviv University found 12 species of bat living in old army outposts in the Jordan Valley.

Various animal species have become extinct due to unchecked hunting under Ottoman rule and to a lesser extent under British Mandate rule, due to a non-enforcement of hunting laws. By the early 20th century, the white oryx, Syrian brown bear, Asiatic lion, red deer, Asiatic cheetah, and Syrian wild ass had become extinct in the region. Modern hunting laws prohibit all hunting of mammals, birds, reptiles and amphibians, except those considered pests and specific animals in hunting seasons. However the packs of feral dogs that are taking over the countryside are an increasing threat to wildlife and domesticated animals.

Rapid urbanization as well as overforestation (planting many dense eucalyptus and pine forests) have caused the destruction of many natural habitats in modern times. One of the most famous examples of habitats destroyed is the drying of swamps including the Hula lake which caused the local extinction of the European water vole and jungle cat. An ancient wave of urbanization during the Iron Age resulted in the local extinction of the aurochs, bubal hartebeest, and hippopotamus.

Another distinguished cause of endangerment is the past use of DDT and other chemicals which has hurt all of the birds of prey populations as well as the bat population (mainly Microchiroptera) which were also killed by human made lighting in the caves due to the suspicion that fruit-eating bats were harming local crops.

Some mammals that have gone locally extinct are being reintroduced, such as the Persian fallow deer and the roe deer.

The extinct narrow-nosed rhinoceros may have survived in Israel as recently as 15,000 years ago, which if correct would make it the youngest known record of the species.

=== Reptiles ===
Israel has roughly 100 species of reptiles, of which almost a third live in its northern areas. The extinction rate among reptiles has been relatively low here; reptiles that became locally extinct in the region around the beginning of the 20th century include the Nile crocodile, European pond turtle, Levant viper, and Nile monitor.

=== Amphibians ===
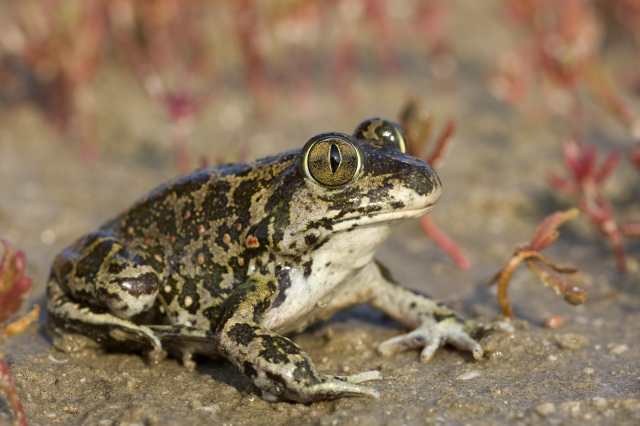
Pelobates syriacus

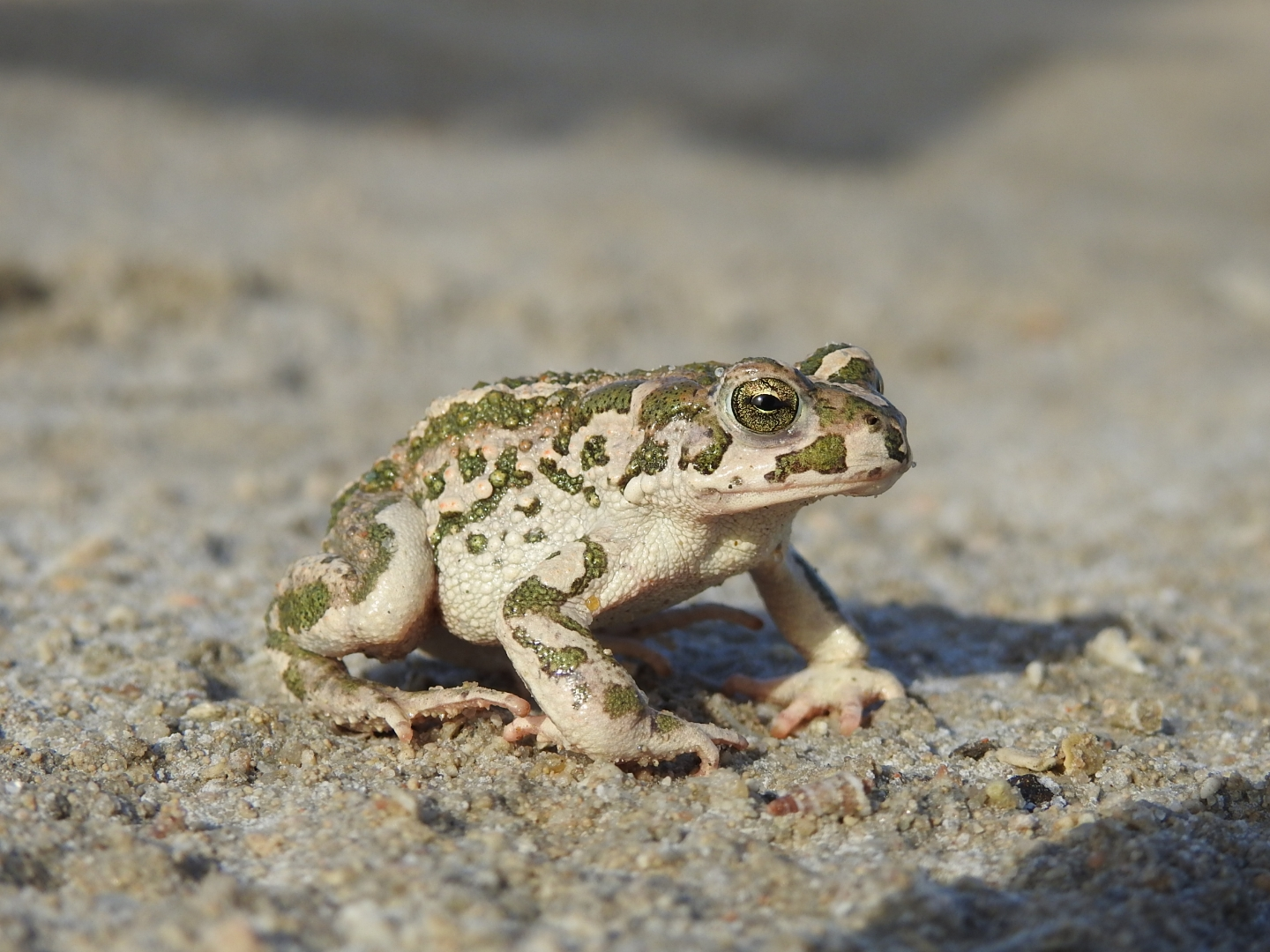
A variable green toad, Israel's most widespread amphibian

The number of amphibians in Israel has decreased dramatically since the last century mainly due to the drying of various swamps and wetlands by early settlers. The Hula painted frog was thought to be extinct until a female specimen was found in November 2011. Environmental improvements in the Hula reserve have been cited as a possible reason for the frog's re-emergence.

The amphibians of Israel include five from the order Anura (the marsh frog, Hyla savignyi, the variable green toad, the eastern spadefoot toad, and the Hula painted frog) and two from the order Urodela (the fire salamander and the banded newt). The banded newt, the eastern spadefoot toad, and the Hula painted frog are critically endangered.

The variable green toad is the most widespread amphibian in Israel, living across nearly the entire Mediterranean shore. While the toad is usually limited to areas with a constant supply of water, populations have begun to spread into drier places. Even though it has relative great range in Israel, a 55% decrease has been noted in active spawning sites, mainly due to destruction of habitats, water contamination and habitats being split by roads or train tracks. The population currently numbers at a few thousands.

The eastern spadefoot toad (Pelobates syriacus), also called Syrian spadefoot toad, is critically endangered and is locally extinct in Jordan. The spadefoot lives in the Israeli coastal plains, north of Holon and Ashdod. Only a few hundred adult toads remain in Israel due to splitting of habitats and the species' loyalty to their spawning spots. The spadefoot is a protected species by law. The banded newt (Ommatotriton vittatus vittatus) lives mainly in the northern areas of Israel, especially in the Galilee area, mostly in vernal pools. The coastal shores near Ashkelon are the southern border for its global population. Small populations in more southern areas disappeared due to water contamination. They are inactive during the summer, staying underground in aestivation, and even in winter they are only active at night. The newts have slightly different breeding seasons depending on location, ranging from January–February in the coastal plains to February–March in the Galilee. The banded newt is critically endangered in Israel (only 5% of the 1950s population remains) and is thus a protected species.

Fire salamanders (Salamandra salamandra salamandra or S. s. infraimmacullata) reside near the Mediterranean shores and are the least widespread of the amphibians of Israel. The salamanders have three distinct populations (in Tel Dan, Mount Carmel and the Galilee). Compared to European populations, the adults have especially long legs and fingers and a more rounded head. The local populations differ in size (Tel Dan salamanders are much smaller), arrangement of spots on the skin and colour (ranging from orange to yellow), in mating habits and times, as well as activity times (Tel Dan salamanders are active throughout most of the year because of their proximity to water). The populations are relatively stable. Nevertheless, they are an endangered species in Israel and one of the three amphibians to be a protected species.

Marsh frogs (Pelophylax ridibundus) live almost exclusively near stable water pools or winter pools, mainly in north and central Israel. The frogs are active even during the summer and sometimes during the day. The frogs are lighter and slightly smaller than in other countries.

The critically endangered Hula painted frog (Latonia nigriventer) is found in the Hula Valley and was endemic to the lake that used to fill the valley. The lake was drained in the 1950s to combat malaria and create more farmland, but the draining of the lake led to the destruction of its unique ecosystem. The frog was declared extinct by the IUCN in 1996. In the 1990s, the southern part of the valley was flooded again, and in 2011 the Hula painted frog was rediscovered. The frog has since been reclassified as critically endangered.

Hyla savignyi, also known as Savigny's treefrog, is the most abundant amphibian in Israel, though its available breeding sites have decreased and it is considered "vulnerable". Populations reside in the Northern Negev and north of it, though they once reached as far as the Dead Sea. The population is estimated at a few thousands.

=== Fish ===
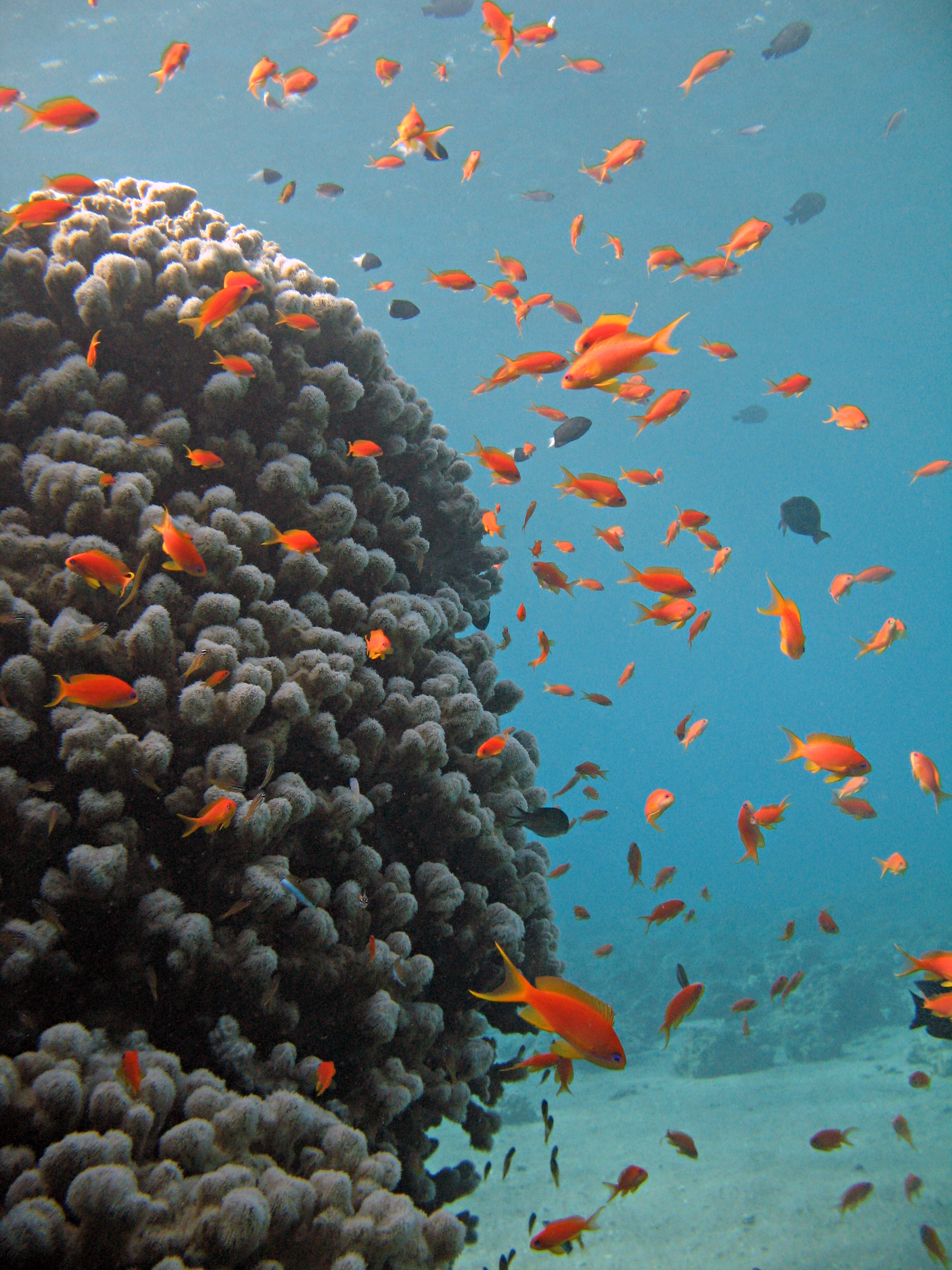
Sea goldies in the Gulf of Eilat

Israel is currently home to about 1,728 species of fish, 410 of which in the Mediterranean and 1,270 in the Red Sea. The rest, 48 species, are cultivated or wild freshwater fish. The fish population has declined and endemic species such as Nemacheilus dori have become endangered. Acanthobrama hulensis became extinct in the 1970s following a decline in population after the drying of the Hula lake. In 2012, the Acanthobrama telavivensis, was which was nearly extinct, reappeared in the Yarkon River after a decade of rehabilitation and preservation efforts. Einot Zukim, saline wetlands in the north of the Dead Sea, is the only known place in the world where populations of blue and Dead Sea killifish (Nevit Hula and Nevit Yam Hamelakh) live side by side.

The long jaw tristramella became extinct in 1990.

=== Birds ===
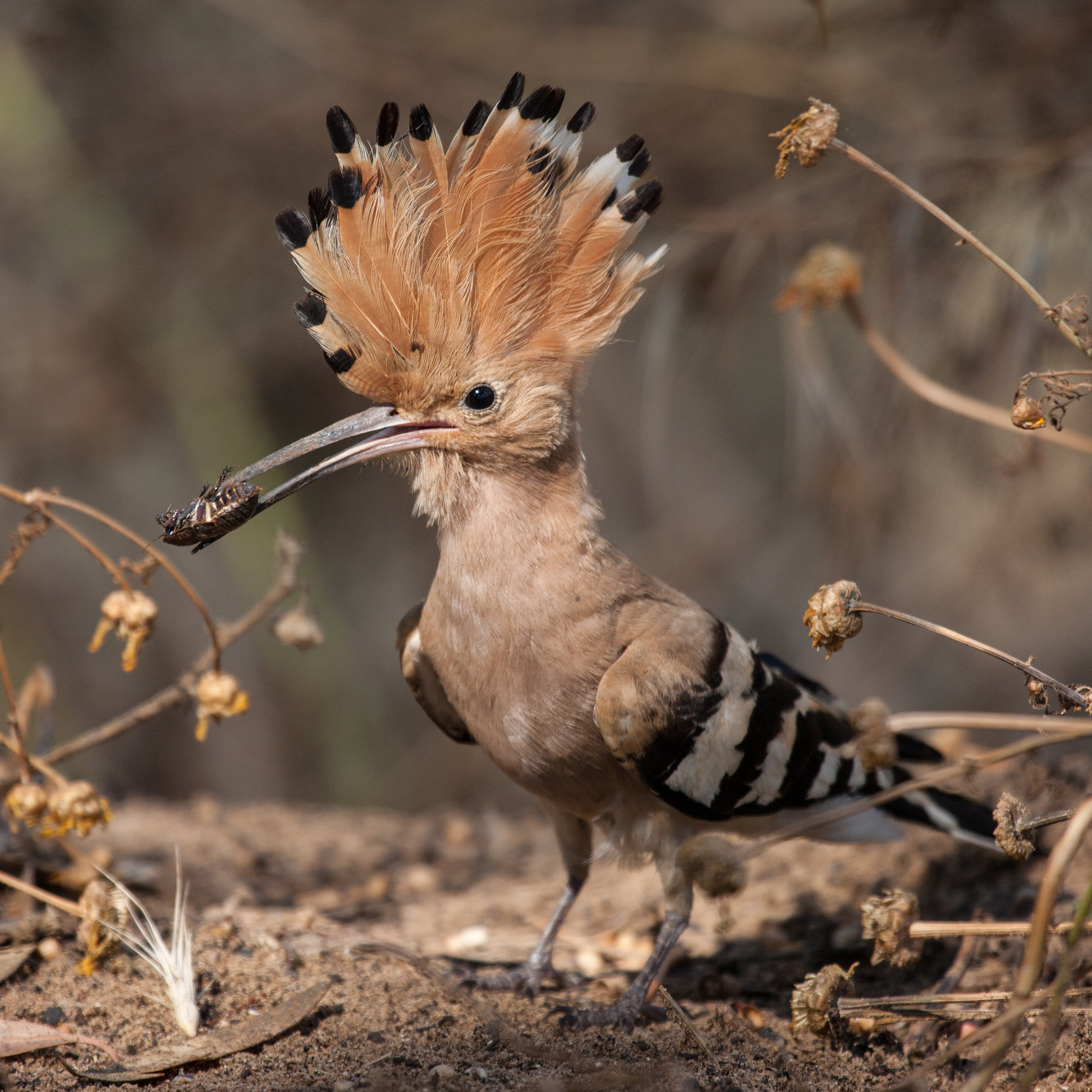
A Eurasian hoopoe, Israel's national bird, with insect

About 500 million birds from 500 species pass through Israel during the bi-annual migration season, from Europe and West Asia to Africa in the winter, and back in the spring. A program has been developed to build major birdwatching centres in Ein Gedi and Sde Boker. Existing stations will be upgraded in Eilat, the Jordan Valley and kibbutzim Kfar Ruppin and Ma'agan Michael.

Lake Hula is the stopover point for tens of thousands of cranes migrating from Finland to Ethiopia every winter. In Israel, farmers set out food for them to keep them from damaging crops near the lake.

The number of raptors has been decreasing due to its prey becoming endangered or extinct as well as massive poisoning of some prey. About a fifth of the nesting birds are endangered (39 out of 206).

Yossi Leshem, director of Israel's International Centre for the Study of Bird Migration, says that the country has one of the highest concentrations of bird traffic in the world per square mile. On a single morning at the Jerusalem Birdwatching Observatory, the staff has spotted 10,000 eagles.

The Arabian ostrich has been extinct from Israel for years. An attempt was made to introduce the North African ostrich from captivity to the open areas and reserves of the Negev desert in Israel where once Arabian ostriches lived.

The northern bald ibis has been extirpated from Israel.

=== Invertebrates ===
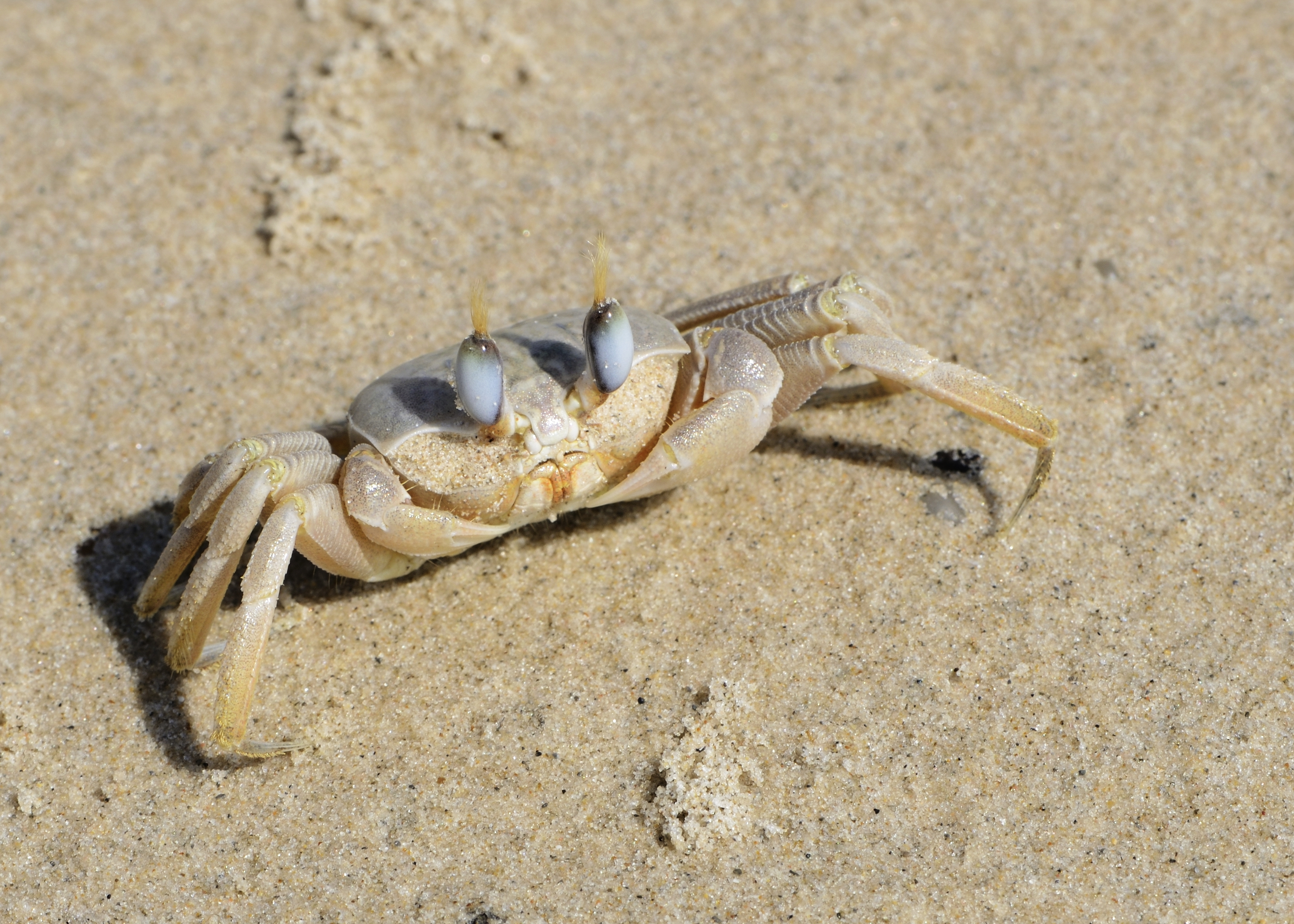
Ocypode cursor crab

Israel has about 30,000 invertebrates, of which about 22,500 are insects and 3,900 are non-insect arthropods. Among the invertebrates there is a wide variety of molluscs, of which about 230 are terrestrial, 850 are of the Mediterranean and 1,120 are of the Red Sea. The insects of Israel belong to various ecological zones, but mainly to the Mediterranean. There are insects belonging to roughly 27 orders in Israel, out of about 29 worldwide.

=== Invasive species ===
Israel contains many invasive species brought by man, including scores of molluscs (the most common is the common garden snail Cornu aspersum) which usually live around gardens and greenhouses but also in natural habitats of native molluscs. As of 2008, over 220 species of invasive insects have been identified, some of them considered pests. The situation is little better with vertebrates, as a 2004 report reported that there are two mammalian invasive species (the coypu and Indian palm squirrel), one fish species (mosquito fish), two reptilian species (the red-eared pond slider and the roughtail gecko) as well as 18 bird species. There are no amphibian invasive species, most likely due to the fact there are no suitable habitats for such.

== Flora ==
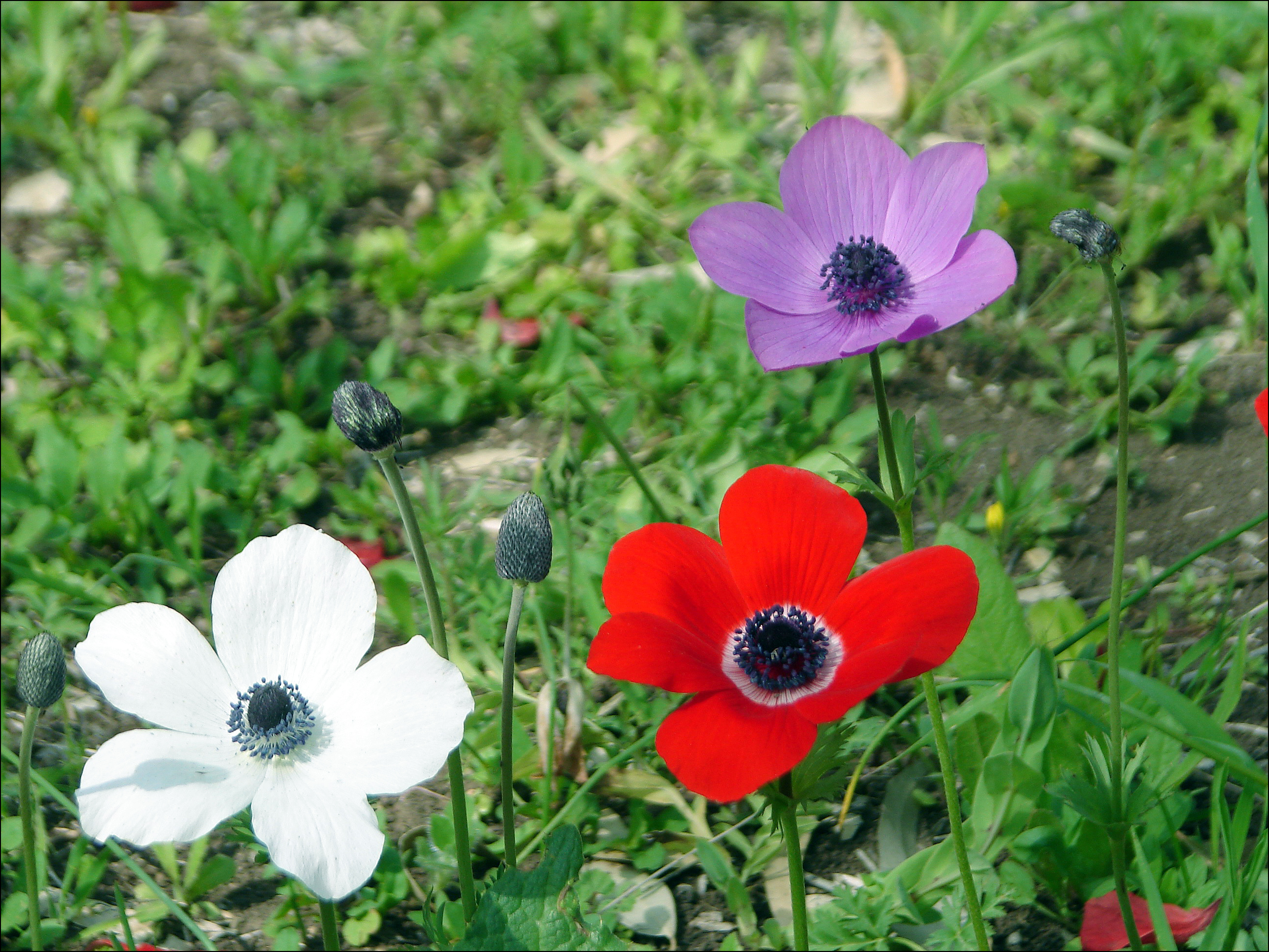
Anemone coronaria, a protected flower that grows wild all over Israel

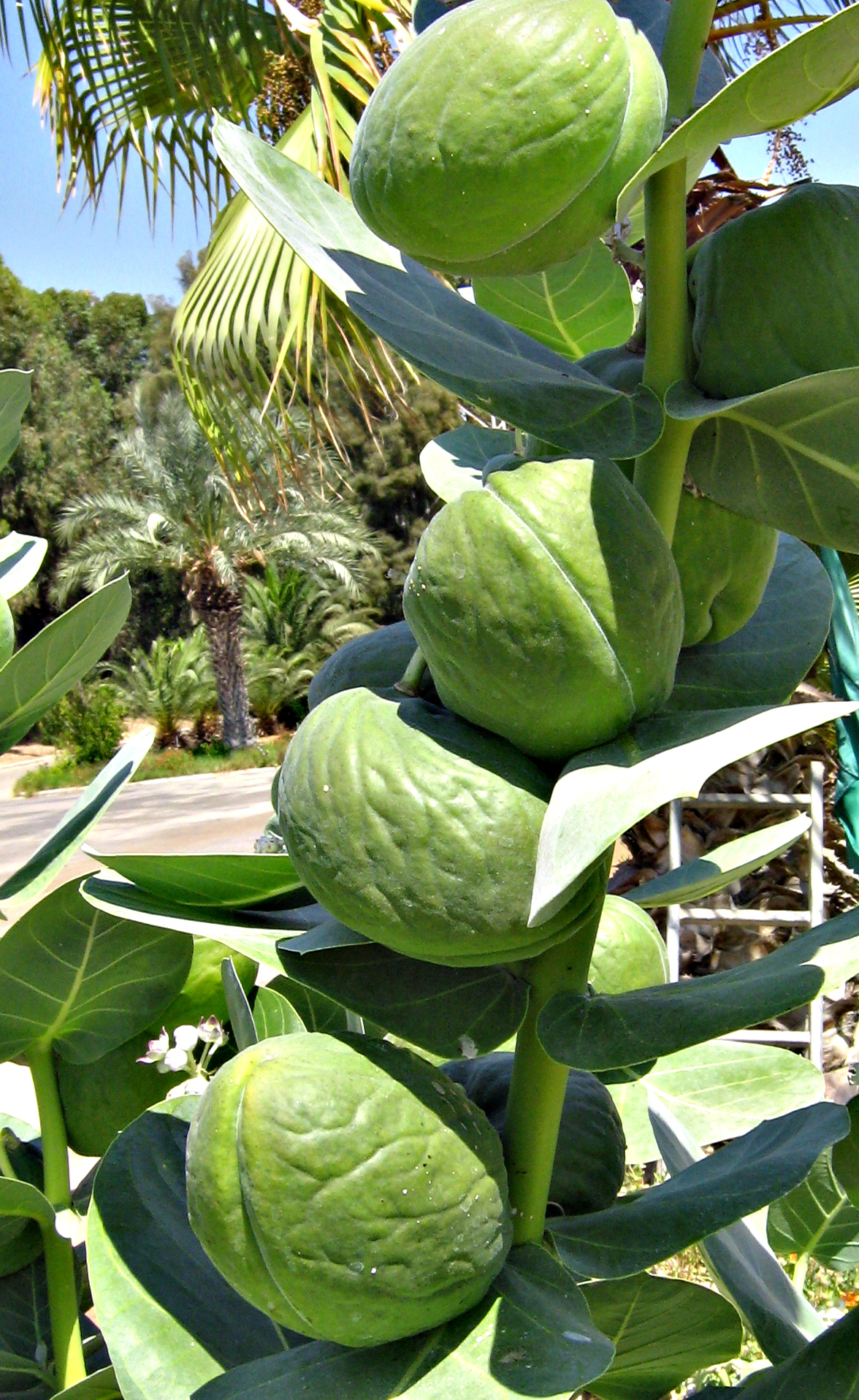
Apple of Sodom, Ein Gedi

There are 2,867 known species of plants found in Israel. Of these, at least 253 species are introduced and non-native. The coastal plain and Sharon regions are especially rich in endemic species. The Galilee fumitory (Fumaria thuretti Boiss), a rare flower with bright pink blossoms and an elongated bulge that collects nectar and attracts wild bees, was discovered in 2012 after botanists believed it was extinct.

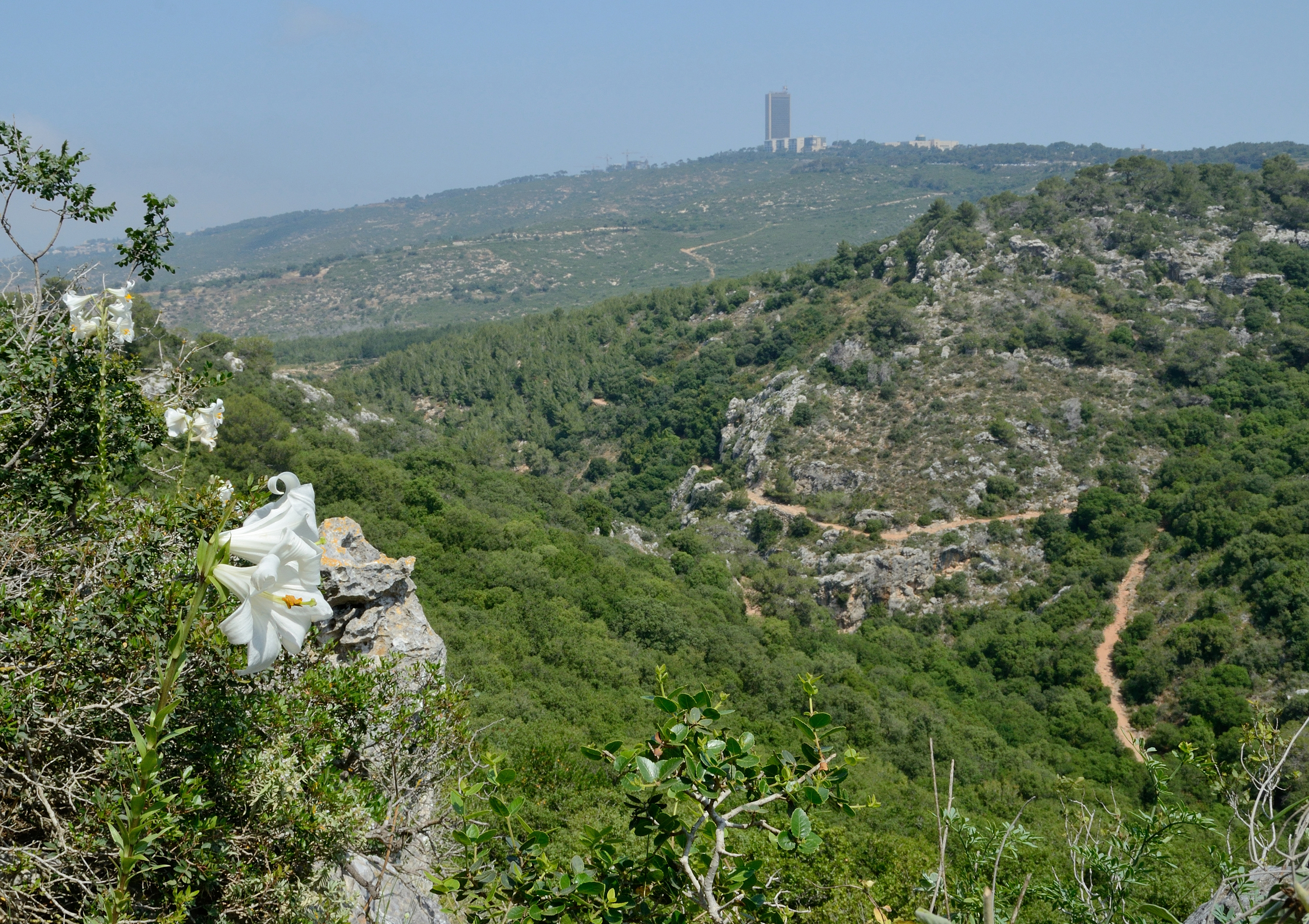
Lilium candidum on Mount Carmel

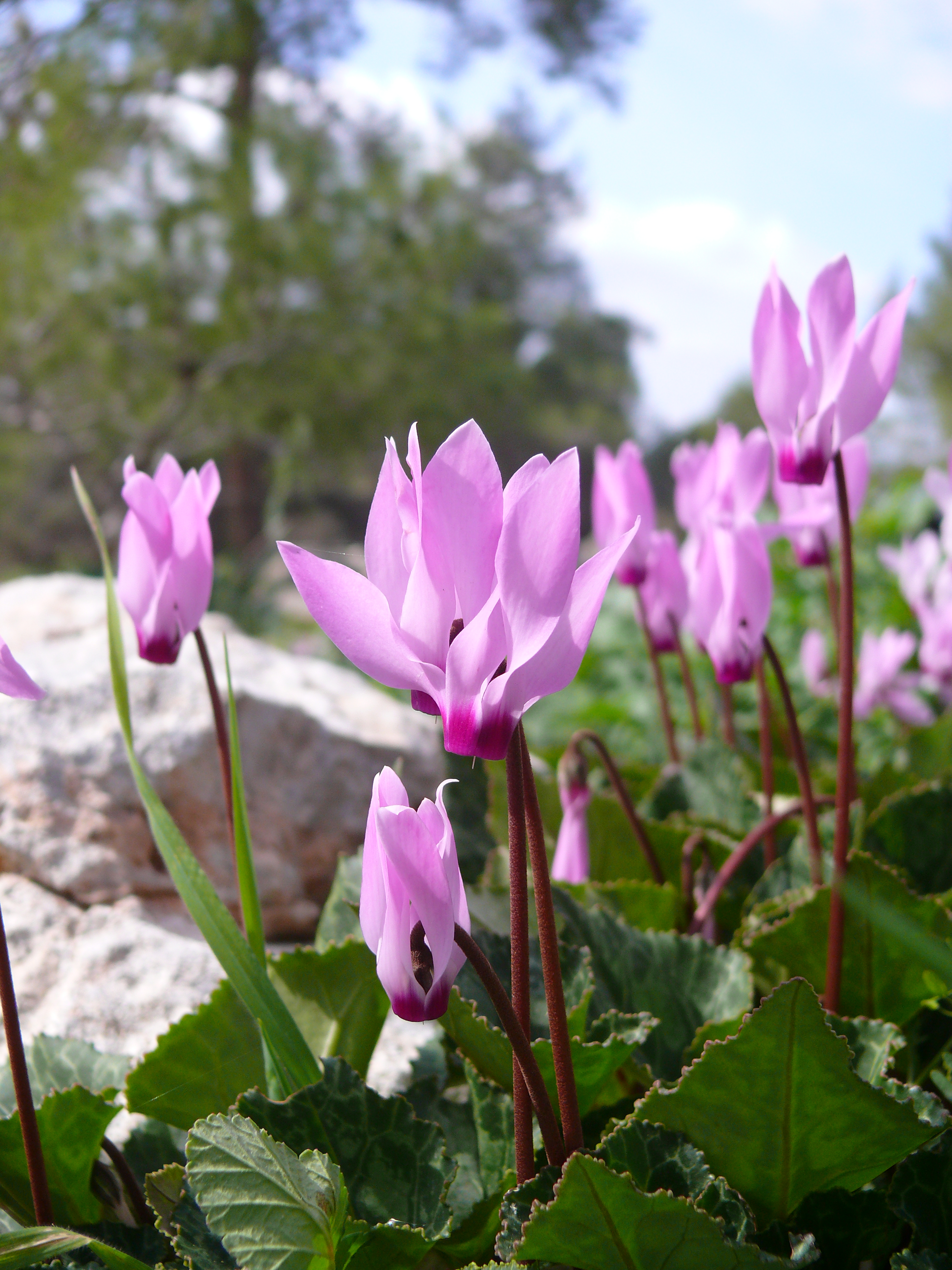
Cyclamen persicum

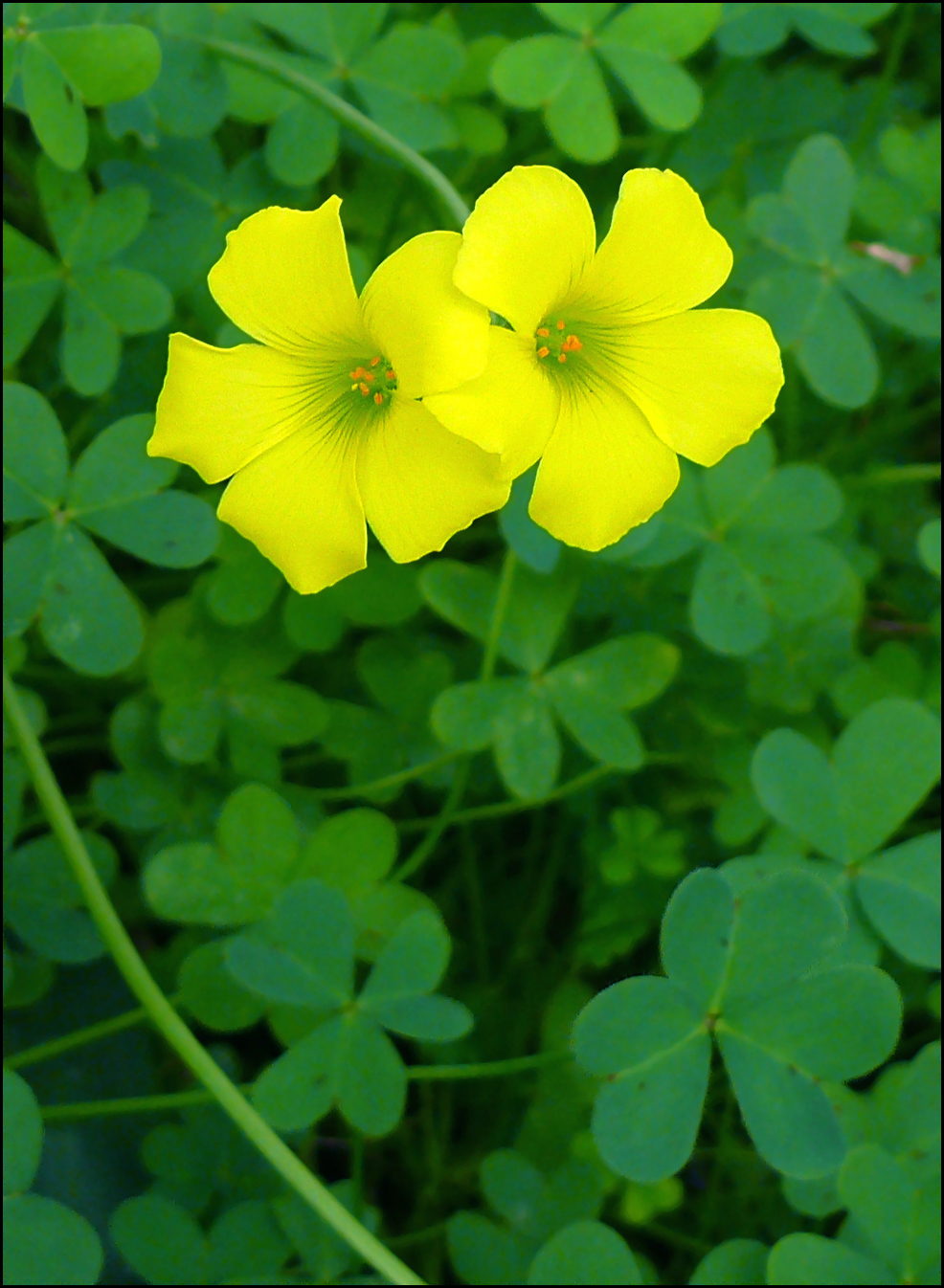
Oxalis pes-caprae, invasive species

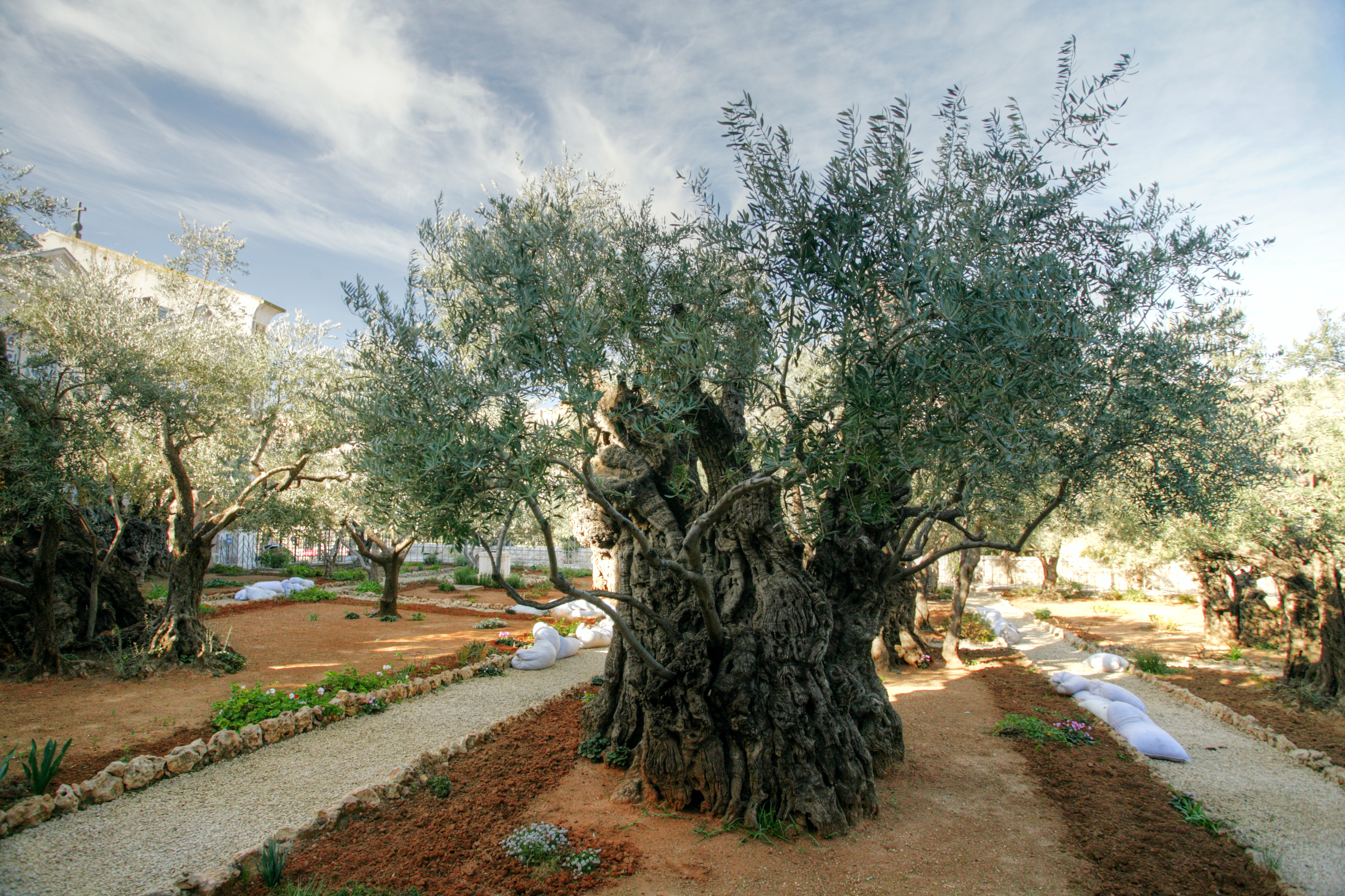
Olive tree

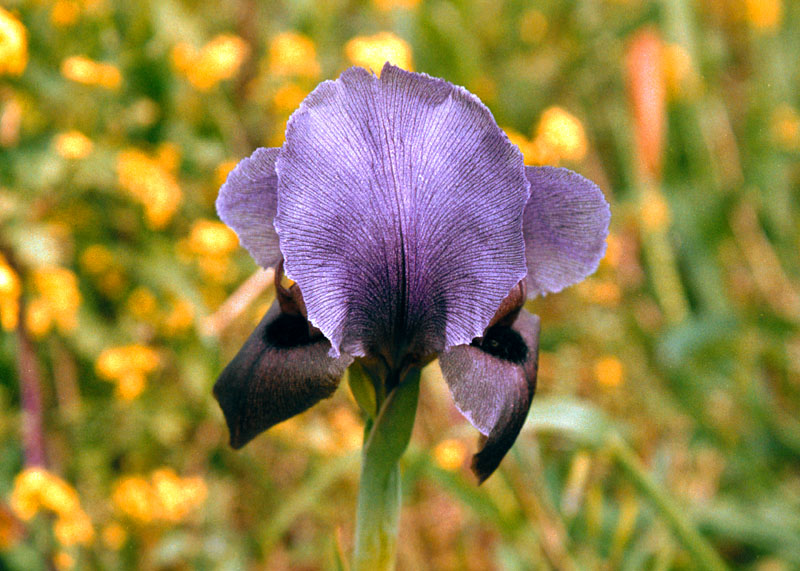
Iris haynei

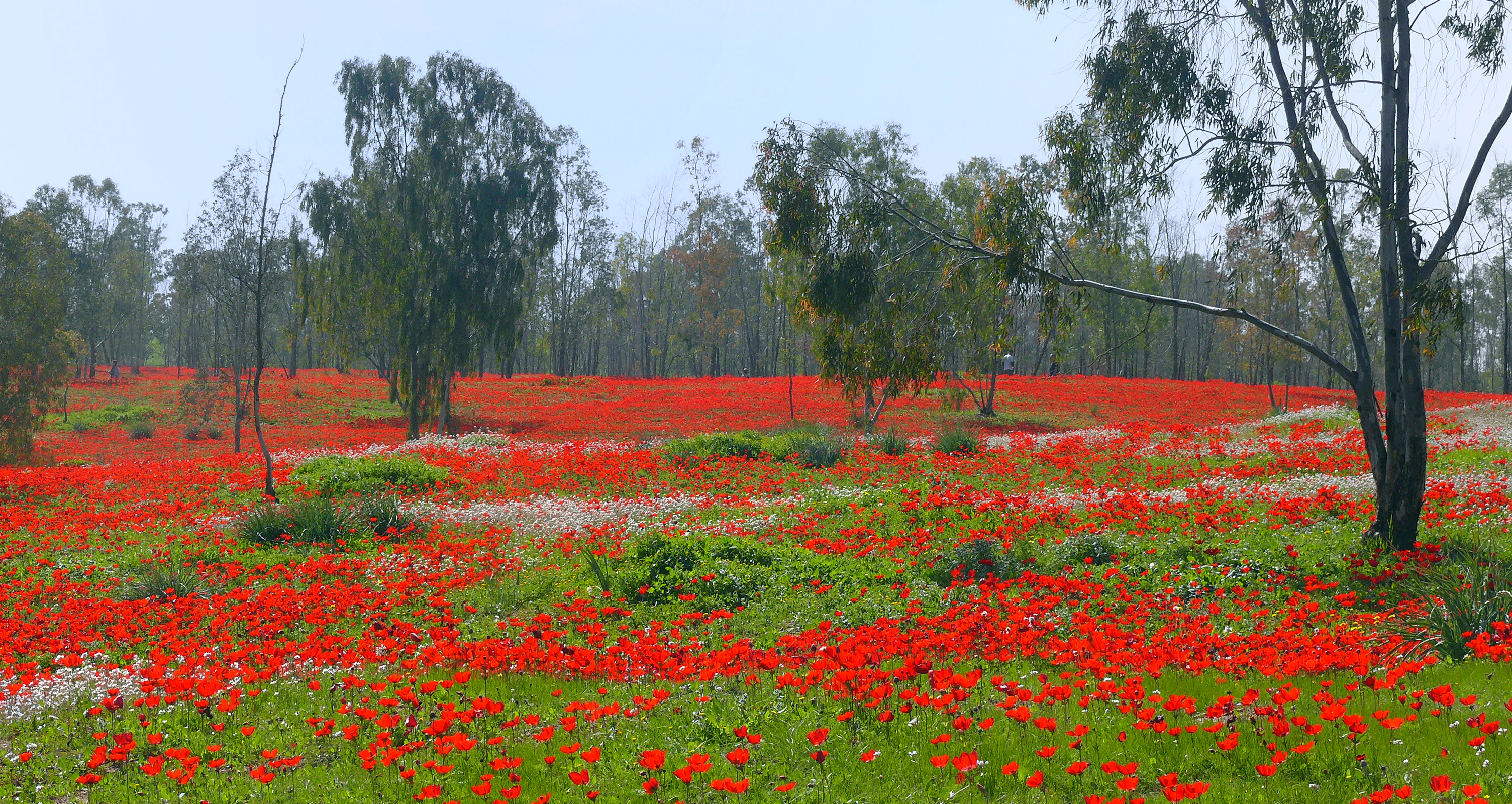
Anemone coronaria thrive in Israel

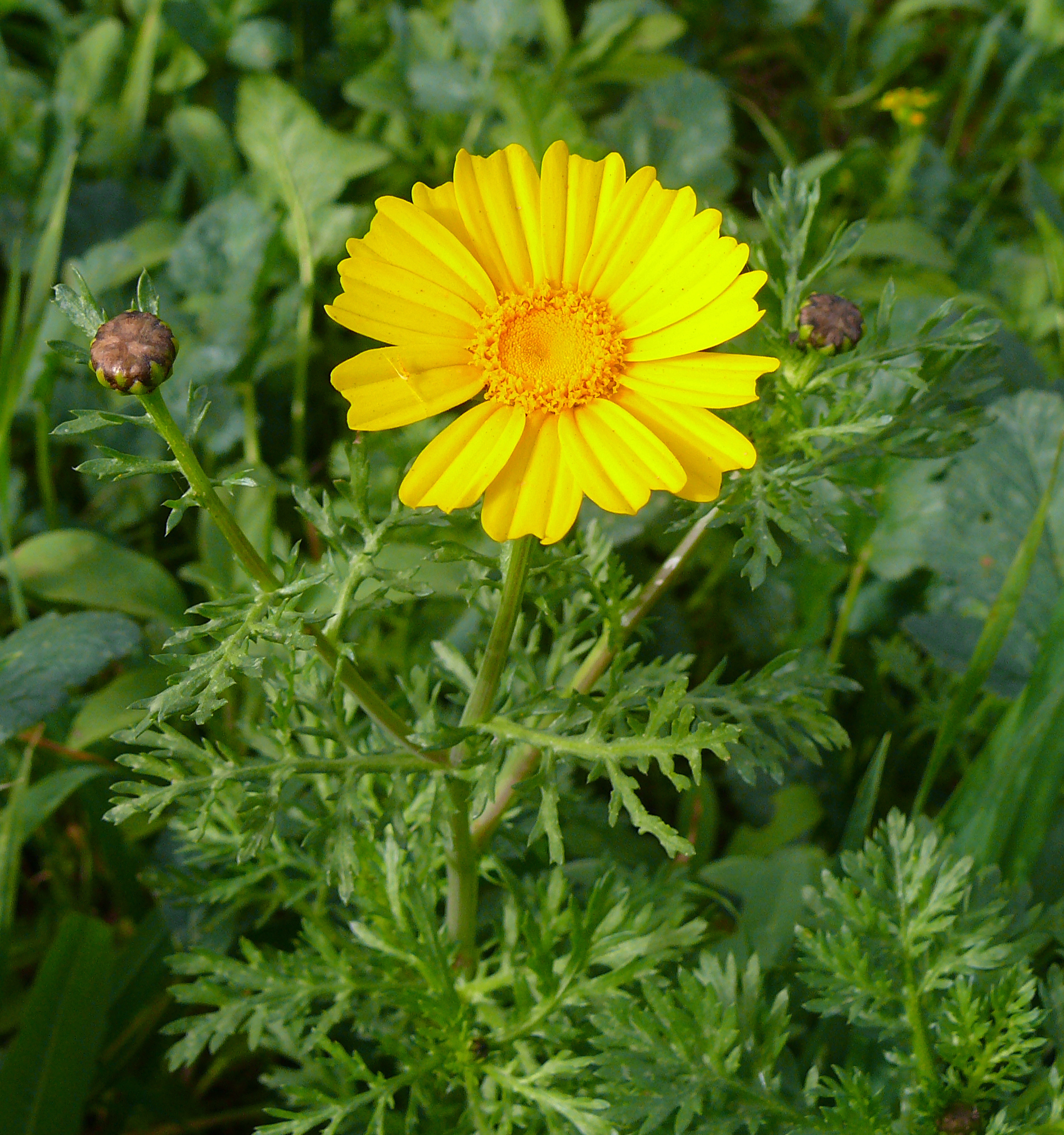
Garland chrysanthemum is a very common spring flower in Israel

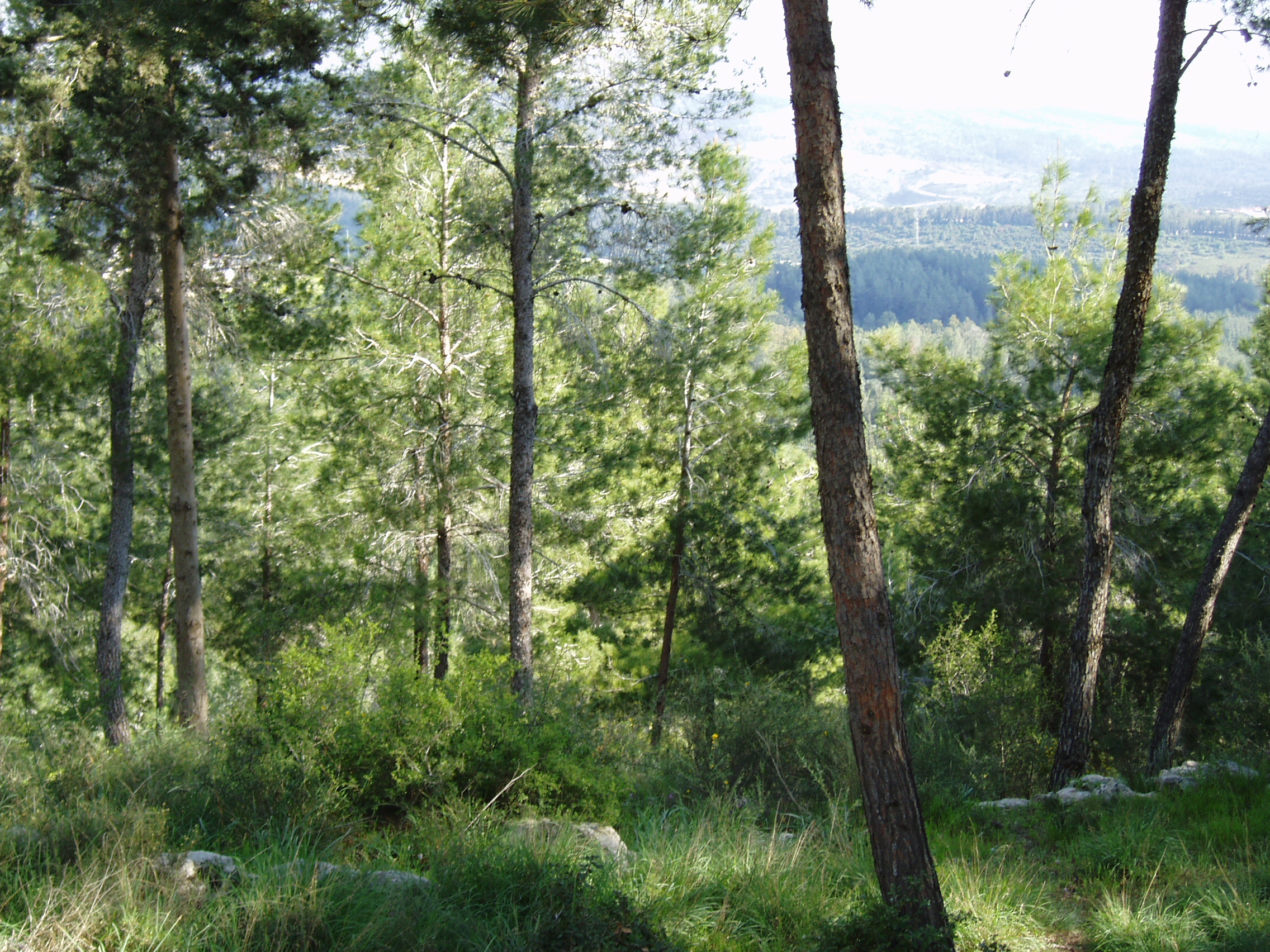
Large pine forests were planted by the Jewish National Fund

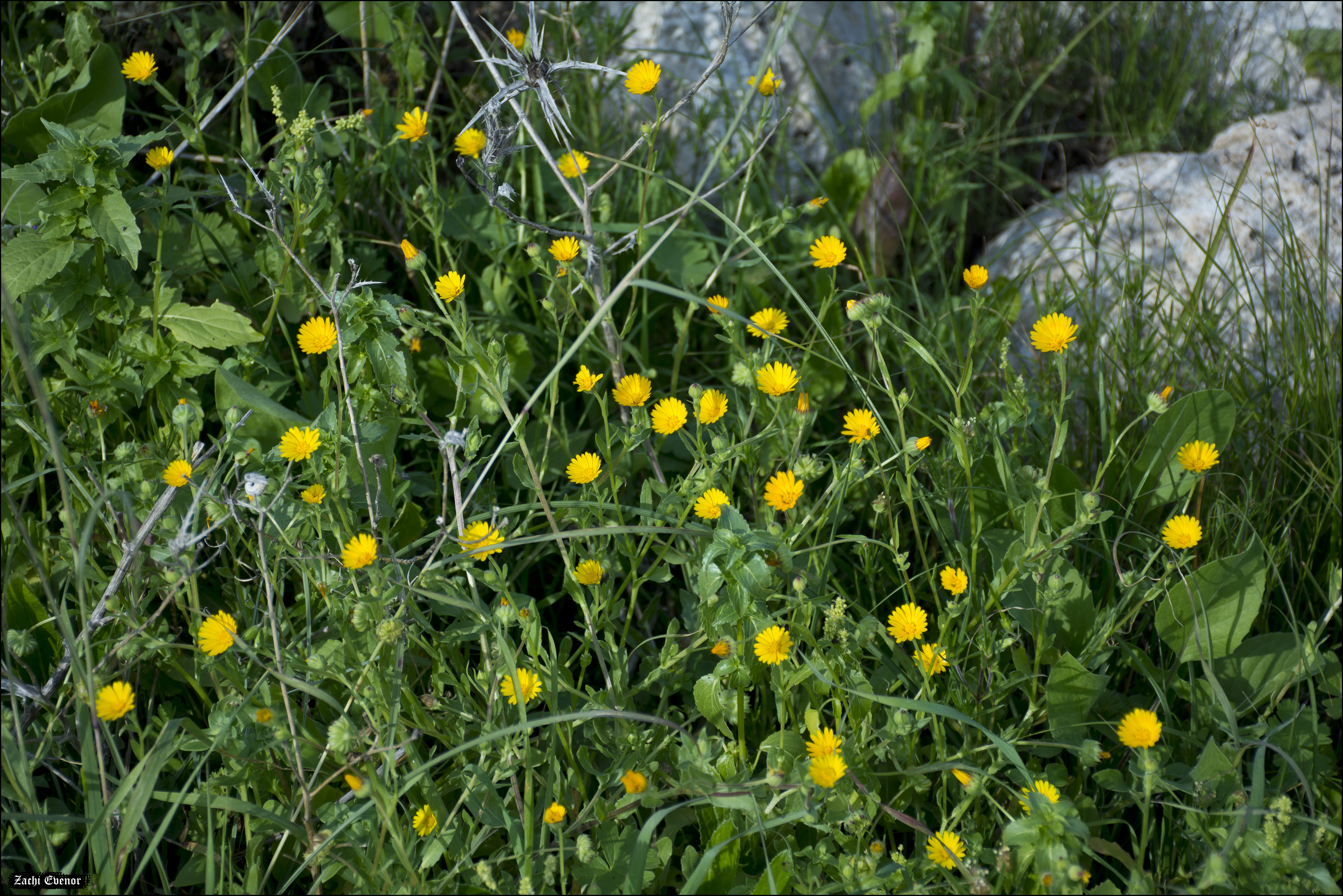
Calendula arvensis, early winter in Israel

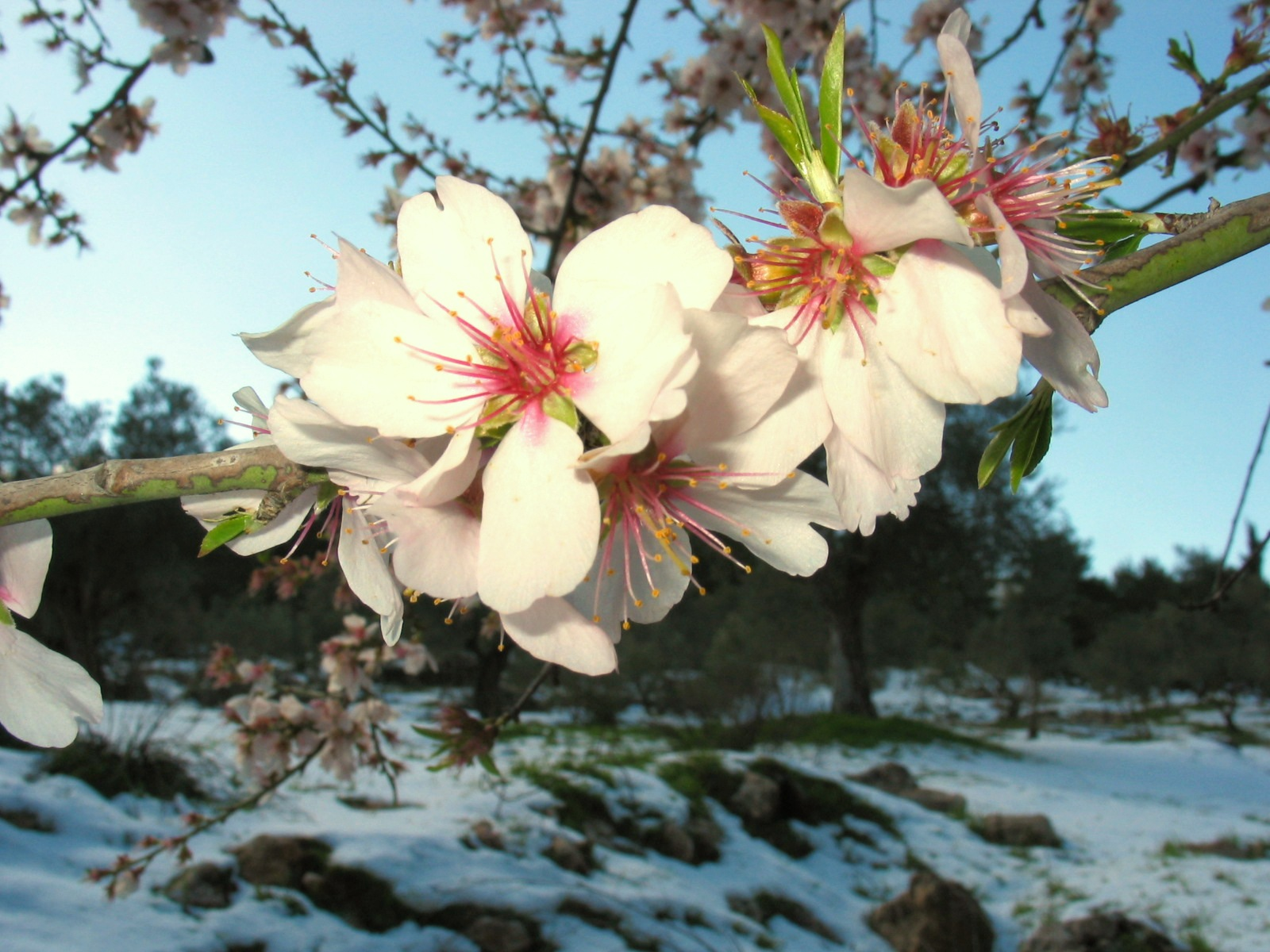
Almond

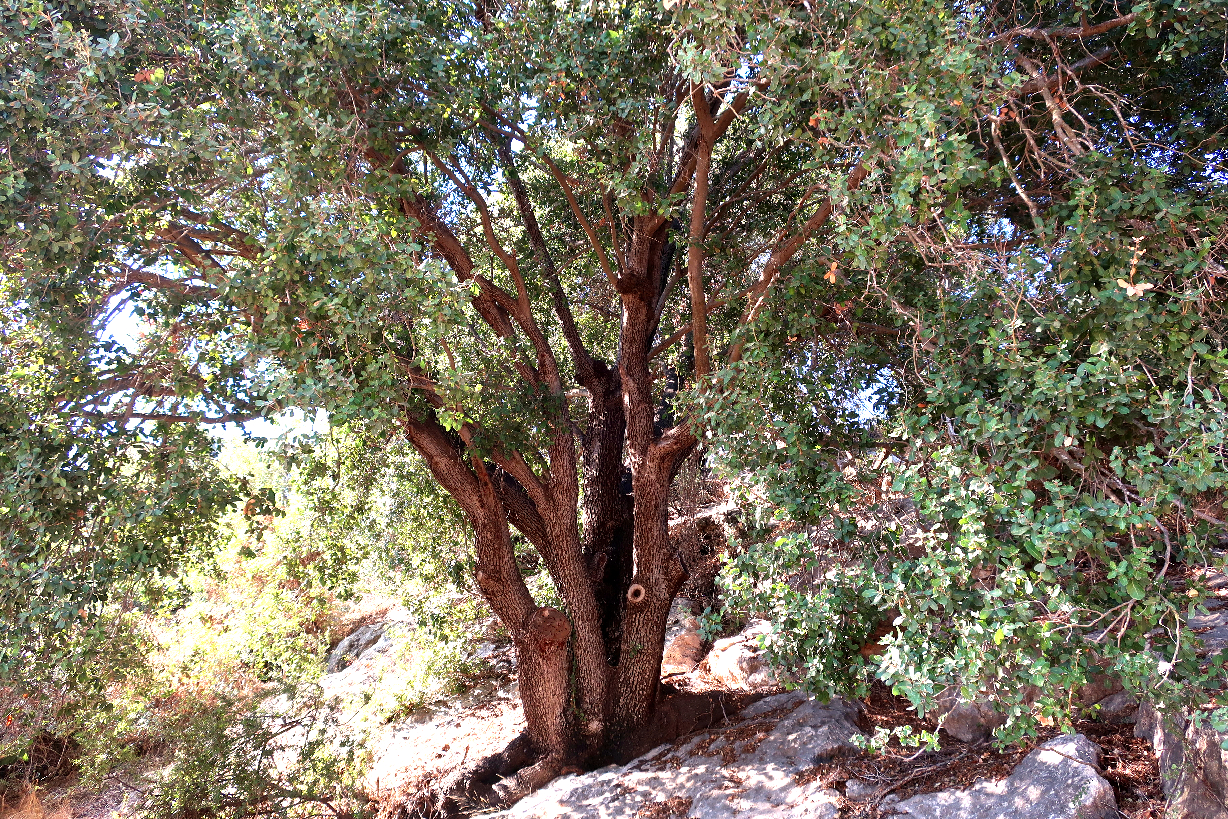
Oak - Quercus calliprinos

== See also ==
- Biodiversity in Israel, the West Bank, and the Gaza Strip
- Society for the Protection of Nature in Israel
- Acanthobrama lissneri
- Acanthobrama terraesanctae
- Biblical Zoo
- List of endemic flora of Israel
- List of reptiles of Israel
- Ramat Gan Safari
- Tourism in Israel

== Sources ==
- Dolev, Amit (2004). Avi Perevolotsky (ed.). The Red Book: Vertebrates in Israel. Israel: Israel Nature and Parks Authority. ISBN 978-965-90466-0-7.
