= Scope =

Scope or scopes may refer to:

== Arts, media, and entertainment ==
- CinemaScope or Scope prints, anamorphic film prints
- Scope (magazine), a South African men's magazine
- The Scope (alternative weekly), a newspaper in St. John's, Newfoundland
- Scope (Australian TV series)
- Scope (Irish TV series)
- Scope (album), a 1979 studio album by Buck Hill Quartet
- Scope (Dutch band)

== Computing ==
- Scope (computer programming), the range in which a variable can be referenced
- scope (scopeArchiv), an archival information program
- CDC SCOPE, a series of Control Data Corporation operating systems

== Concepts ==
- Scope (logic), the range influenced by the quantification in logic
- Scope (formal semantics), the natural language counterpart of logical scope
- Scope (project management), the sum of all projects, products and their features
- Scope of practice (US and Canada), terminology that defines the procedures, actions, and processes that are permitted for licensed professionals

== Devices and procedures ==
- Any of a number of viewing instruments
- SCOPE (protein engineering), a technique of creating gene libraries
- Scope (synthesizer), a DSP-based synthesizer by Creamware
- Endoscope, an optical instrument (borescope) used to perform medical visual inspection (endoscopy) of enclosed body cavities. The term "scope" may refer to the following medical procedures:
  - Arthroscopy, for examining a joint space (orthopedics)
  - Bronchoscopy, for examining the lower respiratory tract (pulmonology)
  - Colonoscopy, for examining the large intestine (gastroenterology)
  - Cystoscopy, for examining the bladder (urology)
  - Gastroscopy, for examining the esophagus, stomach and duodenum (gastroenterology)
  - Mediastinoscopy, for examining the anterior mediastinum (cardiothoracics)
  - Laparoscopy, for examining the abdominopelvic cavity (general surgery and gynecology)
  - Nephroscopy, for examining the pelvic and calyceal system of a kidney (urology)
  - Rhinoscopy, for examining the nasal cavity, sinuses and pharynx (otorhinolaryngology)
  - Thoracoscopy, for examining a pleural cavity (cardiothoracics)
  - Ureteroscopy, for examining a ureter (urology)
- Microscope, a magnifying optical instrument used to see objects that are too small for the naked eye
- Oscilloscope, a type of electronic test instrument
- Scope soldering iron, an Australian low-voltage soldering iron
- Telescope, a magnifying optical instrument used to see objects that are too distant for the naked eye
  - Spotting scope, a portable high-power telescope for observation of distant objects
- Telescopic sight, a telescope used as a sighting device, typically on rifles and air rifles

== Organisations ==
- Scope (charity), a British charity that supports people with disabilities
- SCOPE Art Show, a global emerging art fair
- SCOPE Maastricht, a nonprofit study association at Maastricht University, The Netherlands
- Scientific Committee on Problems of the Environment
- Senior Consulting Program for Engineering, a program at Olin College in Massachusetts

== Other uses ==
- John T. Scopes (1900–1970), central figure in the Scopes Trial regarding the teaching of evolution
- Scope (horse), a racehorse
- Scope (mouthwash)
- Norfolk Scope, an arena in Norfolk, Virginia
- Scopes trial, a 1925 US legal case in Tennessee
- SCOPE Act, a 2023 Texas internet law

== See also ==
- Scope creep, the incremental expansion of the scope of a project
- Scopus (disambiguation)
