= Scopus (disambiguation) =

Scopus may refer to:

- Scopus, a bibliographic database for science
- Scopus Technology, Inc., a former producer of server software founded in 1991 in Emeryville, CA, then acquired by Siebel Systems itself acquired by Oracle Corporation.
- Scopus (journal), a journal of East Africa ornithology
- Scopus (bird), the sole genus in the Scopidae bird family
- Mount Scopus, a mountain in northeast Jerusalem
- Scopus Township, Bollinger County, Missouri, a U.S. town

== See also ==
- Scope (disambiguation)
- Skopos (disambiguation)
