= Kiryat Menachem Begin =

Israeli government complex in East Jerusalem

Coordinates: 31°47′49.9″N 35°14′0.63″E

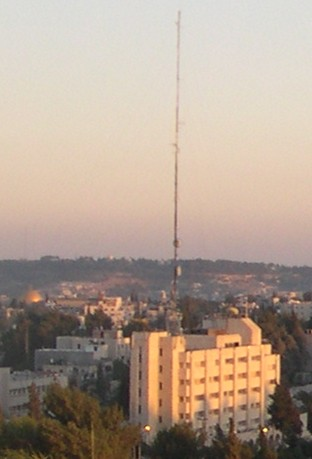
National Headquarters of the Israel Police in Kiryat Menachem Begin, on the western side of Mount Scopus.

Kiryat Menachem Begin, named after former Israeli Prime Minister Menachem Begin, is a complex of government buildings in East Jerusalem located between Sheikh Jarrah in the north, adjacent to Mount Scopus in the east and Ammunition Hill in the west.

The complex is also referred to as Kiryat HaMemshala (Hebrew: קרית הממשלה, lit. 'Government complex'), although Kiryat HaMemshala more commonly refers to the government complex in southwest Jerusalem.

== Overview ==
The Kiryat Menachem Begin complex serves as home to several government offices, along with the main government complex in Givat Ram. It also includes the National Headquarters of the Israel Police.

The complex includes the following institutions:

- The Ministry of Public Security
- The Housing and Construction Ministry
- The Science and Technology Ministry

== History ==
Government offices area in East Jerusalem were built after the Six-Day War in 1967 in an area that separated western and eastern Jerusalem. The first building was the National Headquarters of the Israel Police that was inaugurated in 1973, planned by architect Dan Eytan. In the early 1980s, Prime Minister Menachem Begin decided to set up government offices close to the police headquarters. After his death the area was named after him.

== See also ==
- Kiryat Menachem
