= National Headquarters of the Israel Police =

Police headquarters in East Jerusalem

Coordinates: 31°47′49.78″N 35°13′57.46″E

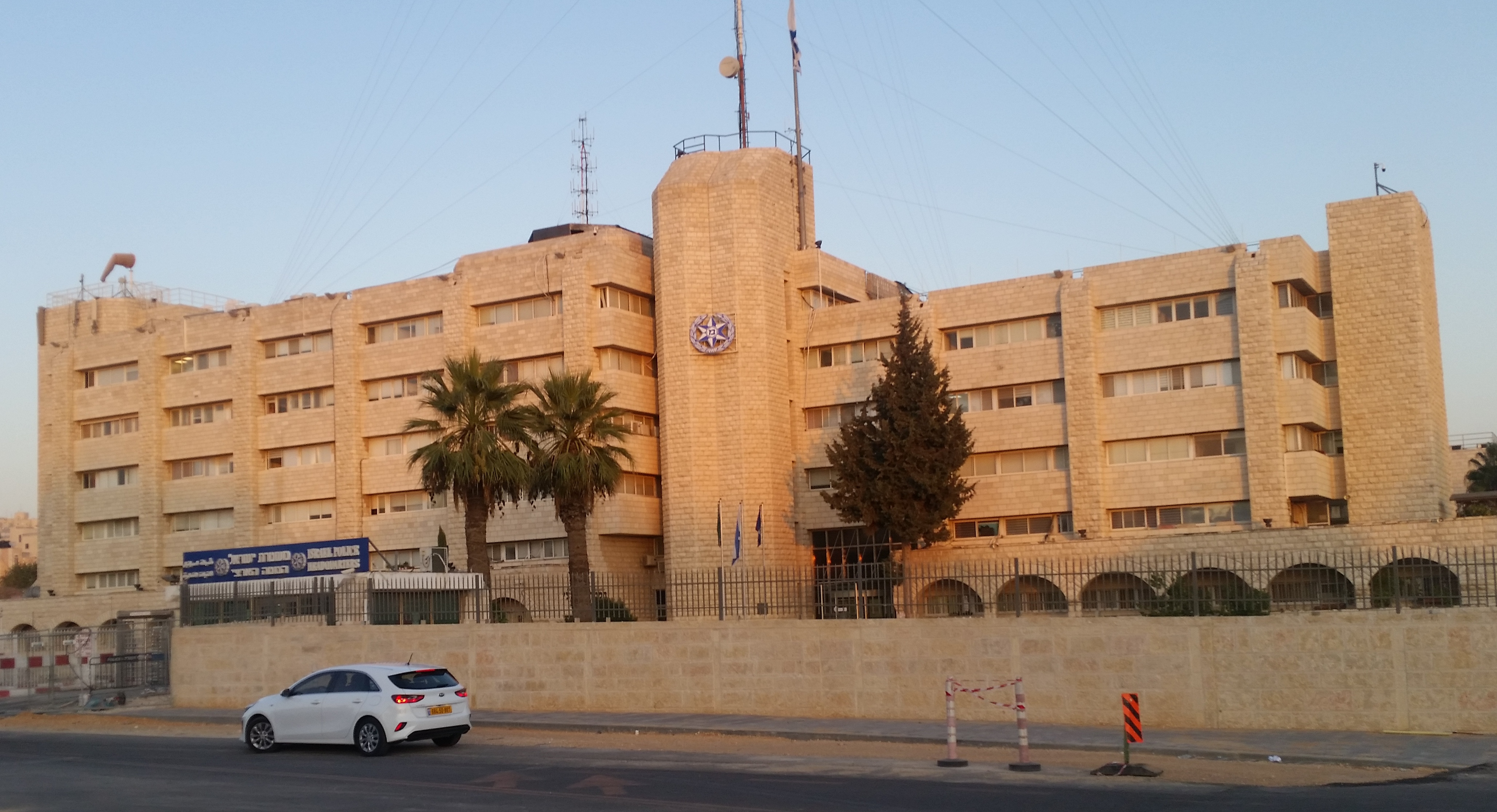
National Headquarters of the Israel Police in Kiryat Menachem Begin

The National Headquarters of the Israel Police (Hebrew: בניין המטה הארצי של משטרת ישראל, romanized: Binian HaMateh HeArtzi shel Mishteret Yisrael) is the headquarters of the Israel Police, located in Kiryat Menachem Begin in East Jerusalem.

== History ==
During Israel's first two decades, the Israel Police headquarters were in Tel Aviv. As the organization increased its size, the need for a new staff building became apparent. Following the Six-Day War, in which Israel captured all of Jerusalem, a new location was chosen in eastern Jerusalem, between Mount Scopus and the western part of the city.

The original building, first planned during the Jordanian period as a hospital, was redesigned by architect Dan Eytan and inaugurated in 1973, at which time a second and larger building was added. The Ministry of Public Security building was later built next to the police headquarters.

The Israel National Police headquarters houses a centralized computer in which all criminal records are stored. Gun permits, vehicle registration and driving licenses are also on file.
