= Hecht Synagogue =

Synagogue

Coordinates: 31.7919°N 35.2423°E

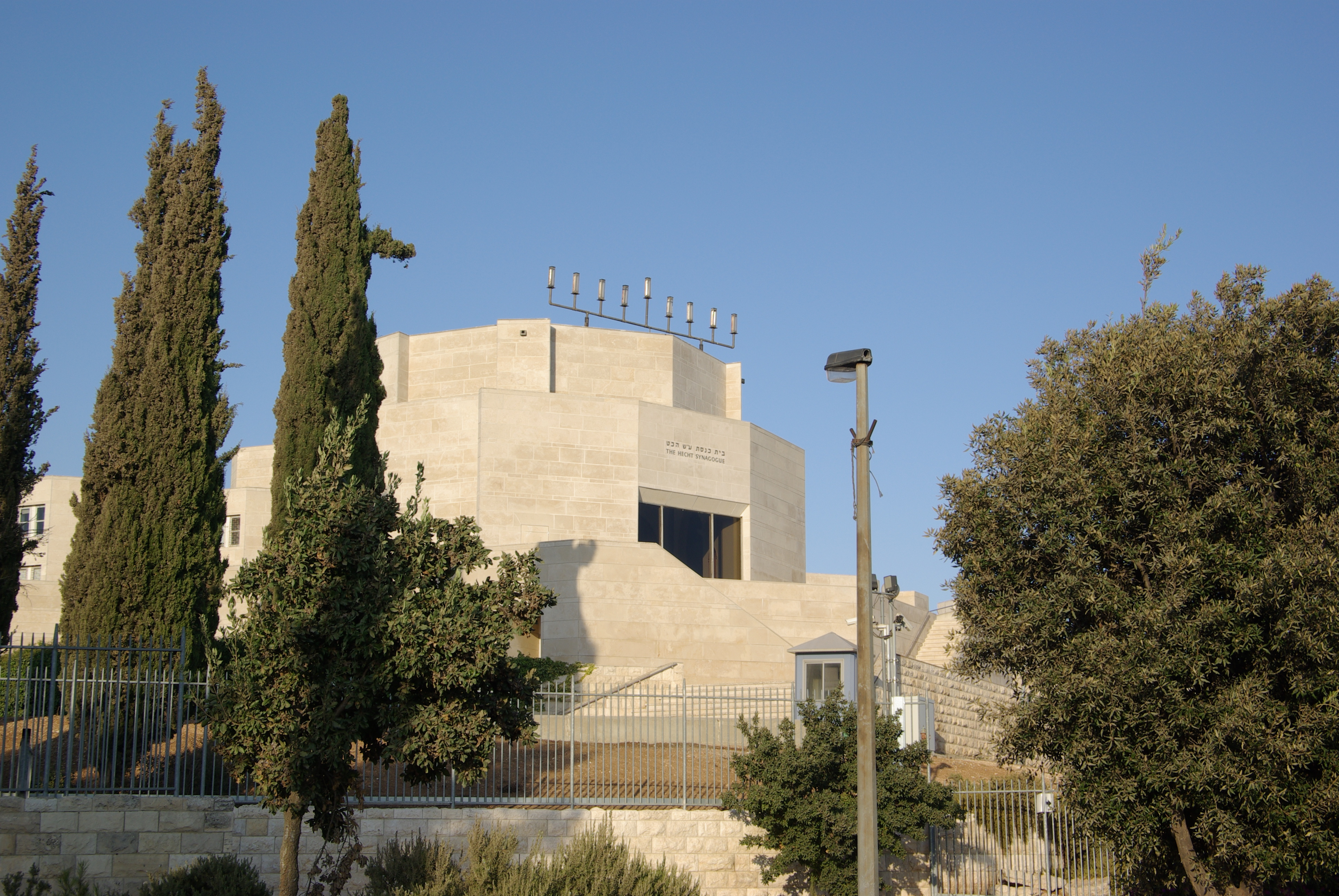

Religion
- Affiliation: Orthodox Judaism
- Status: Active

Location
- Location: Jerusalem, Israel
- Interactive map of Hecht Synagogue

Architecture
- Architect: Ram Karmi
- Completed: 1981

Hecht Synagogue (Hebrew: בית הכנסת הכט) is a synagogue located on the Mount Scopus campus of the Hebrew University of Jerusalem.

== History ==
The Hecht synagogue was established by the family of Mayer Jacob "Chic" Hecht (1928–2006), a Republican United States Senator from Nevada and U.S. Ambassador to the Bahamas. It is noted for the unique arrangement of the Torah ark and panoramic view of the Old City of Jerusalem from a huge window. The building was designed by Israeli architect Ram Karmi. Construction was completed in June 1981.

The synagogue overlooks the Temple Mount. The building is constructed of Jerusalem stone with a women's section on the gallery floor. The synagogue does not operate on Sabbath and the Jewish holidays.

== See also ==
- Architecture of Israel
- History of the Jews in Israel
- List of synagogues in Israel
- Synagogues of Jerusalem
