= Skopos (disambiguation) =

Skopos is a village in Greece.

Skopos may also refer to:

- Skopos theory, a translation studies concept
- Skopo, Sežana, a village in Slovenia

== See also ==
- Scopus (disambiguation)
