= Scope (Dutch band) =

Dutch jazz rock band

- Origin: Zwolle, the Netherlands
- Genres: Jazz Rock
- Years active: 1971–1976
- Past members: Rik Elings; Henk Zomer; Erik Raayman; Rens Nieuwland; Rob Franken; Robert Vink; Pablo Nahar; Roland Zeldenrust; Cees Essers; Peter Schön; Paul Bachmeier; Arthur Clark

Scope was a Dutch jazz rock group that was active from 1971 to 1976. It was founded in the city of Zwolle by keyboardist/flutist Rik Elings and drummer Henk Zomer as a successor to their band Strange Power. Their compositions utilize elements of jazz as well as progressive rock combined with the prominent use of sounds that are typical of the decade such as the use of the wah-wah pedal. During their period of activity they were popular in the jazz rock scene in the Netherlands and often compared by Dutch publications to other jazz fusion groups, mostly those that originated in the United States.

They are also often associated with bands from the Dutch progressive rock scene. The band released two albums in the 70s and a third one, which consists of unreleased recordings, was released on streaming platforms during the 2010s and made more widely available in 2020.

== History ==
Scope started as a continuation of the band Strange Power, founded in 1969, in which Elings and Zomer, as well as Henk van Ling and Stanley Kho, played. The band recorded three singles in 1971, two of which were made in collaboration with singer Barry Freeman. After guitarist Rens Newland and bassist Erik Raayman joined Elings and Zomer, the name of the group was changed to Scope. In 1974, they recorded their first, self titled album in Germany during one of their tours. It was released by the record label Atlantic and features six compositions by Elings as well as two by Newland which make up a total of eight tracks. This album was included in Billboard's FM Action list – which lists albums that have been played by "leading progressive stations" across the United States – on the magazine's September 1974 issue.

That same year, another album by the group was recorded in Germany and it was released by Atlantic the following year. This second album, known as II or Scope II also consisted of eight tracks – which could be counted as nine due to 'The Zebra' being divided into two parts – composed, once again, mostly by Elings. Three of them, including the previously mentioned two-part composition, were created by Rens Newland. This time, the lineup features Elings on bass and Rob Franken taking the former's previous role on keyboards due to Raayman leaving the group to join another Dutch band called Medusa. Two of this second albums's tracks, "Frisky Frog Funk" and "High Checker", were released as singles. Both albums were originally produced by Jochen Petersen and were reissued in CD format in 2020 by Sireena Records.

In 1976 both founding members left the group, which went into inactivity after a series of lineup changes. Members of Scope at this time included Robert Vink and Roland Zeldenrust on drums, Peter Schön on keyboard, and previously Cees Essers on bass who was replaced by Pablo Nahar and Paul Bachmeier.

=== Scope III ===
In 2010, Rens Newland released a third Scope album on the internet, titled Scope III, which features unreleased recordings of varying sound quality from 1976. Originally meant to be released at that time, it was cancelled because the studio thought it wouldn't meet their sales expectations. The compilation was made more widely available in 2020, when it was put on Spotify and released digitally by Jive Music. According to Rens Newland, this album is a "bootleg", since the original recording were destroyed in a fire. The lineup in Scope III consists of Rens Newland, Rob Franken, Robert Vink, and Arthur Clark.

== Critical reception ==
Several publications in the Netherlands had a generally positive reception towards Scope's music, specifically in 1975, the same year their second album was released. Newspaper publications such as Limburgsch Dagblad, Nieuwe Winterwijksche courant or Nieuwsblad van het Noorden have referenced Mahavishnu Orchestra as well as Chick Corea and his band Return to Forever when talking about the band, referring to Scope as a Dutch equivalent of those groups, while the Algemeen Dagblad stated in one of their issues that they were "starting to get a face of their own." These comparisons to groups formed in the United States have been included in more recent online publications, including official promotional material.
