= ScopeArchiv =

- Developer(s): scope solutions ag
- Stable release: 5.3 / February 2019
- Operating system: Windows
- Type: database
- License: Proprietary
- Website: www.scope.ch

scopeArchiv is an archive information program that covers the hybrid records management as well as the digital preservation.

scopeArchiv covers the archival work process from accession to usage for public and private archives. It allows the OAIS conform and ISO 20652 based transfer of digital data to the archive. The software follows the international standards ISAD(G), ISAAR(CPF), ISDIAH, ISDF and the metadata standards EAD, Dublin Core and PREMIS. It is available in English, German and French.

The module scopeIngest (digital preservation) allows a gate to any archival storage products and works as interface between the description and the repository (e.g. Fedora Commons).
