= Mount Scopus =

Mountain in northeast Jerusalem

- הַר הַצּוֹפִים (Hebrew) جبل المشارف (Arabic)
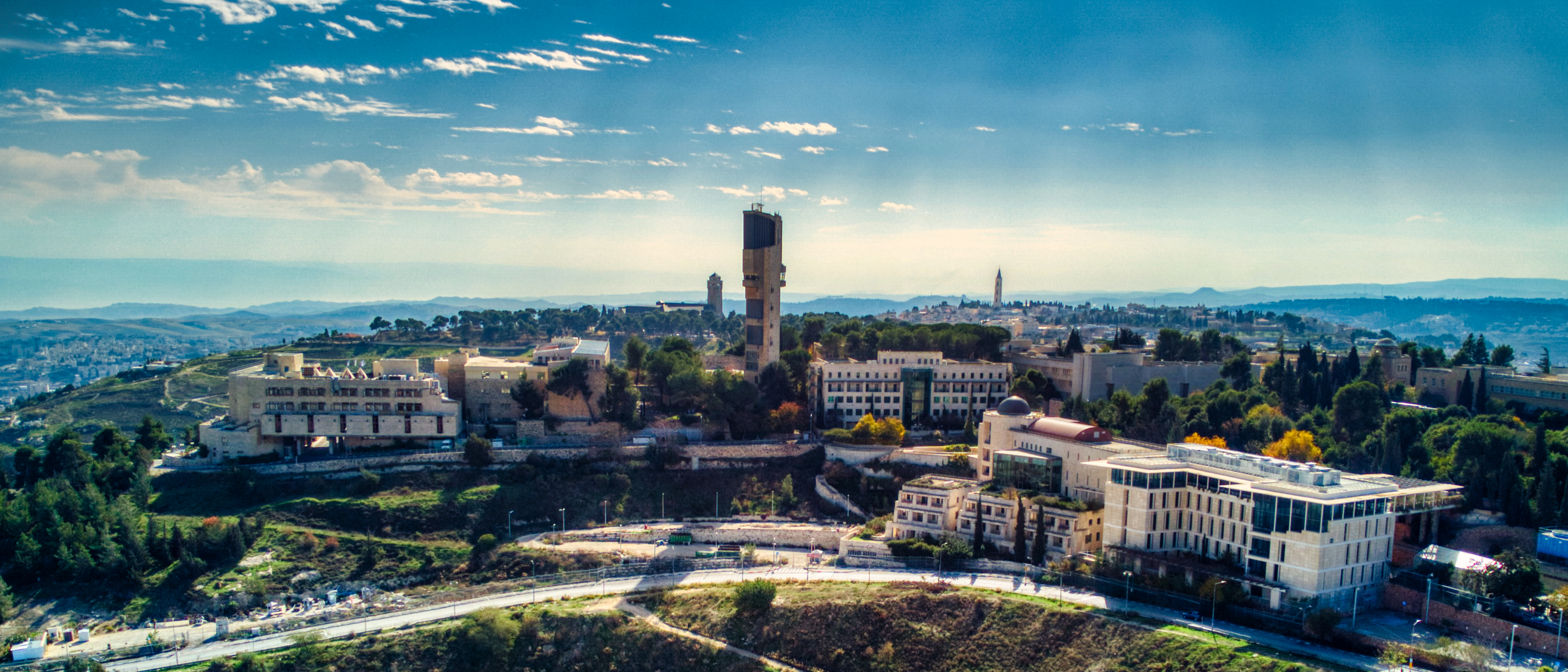
- North view of the main campus and tower of the Hebrew University of Jerusalem, 2022

Highest point
- Elevation: 826 m (2,710 ft)
- Coordinates: 31°47′33″N 35°14′39″E

Geography
- Location: Jerusalem
- Country: Israel
- Parent range: Judaean

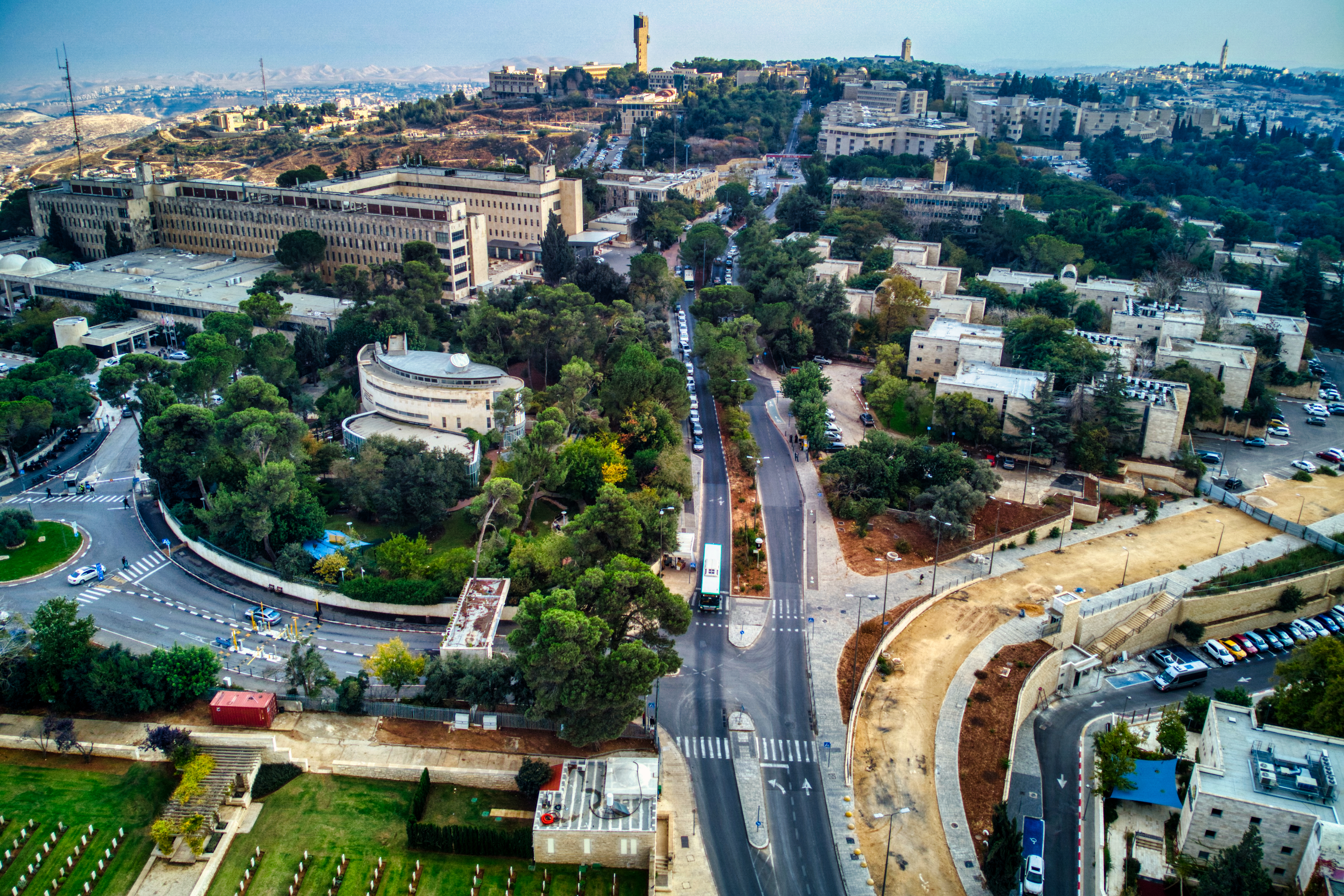
Mount Scopus, Jerusalem

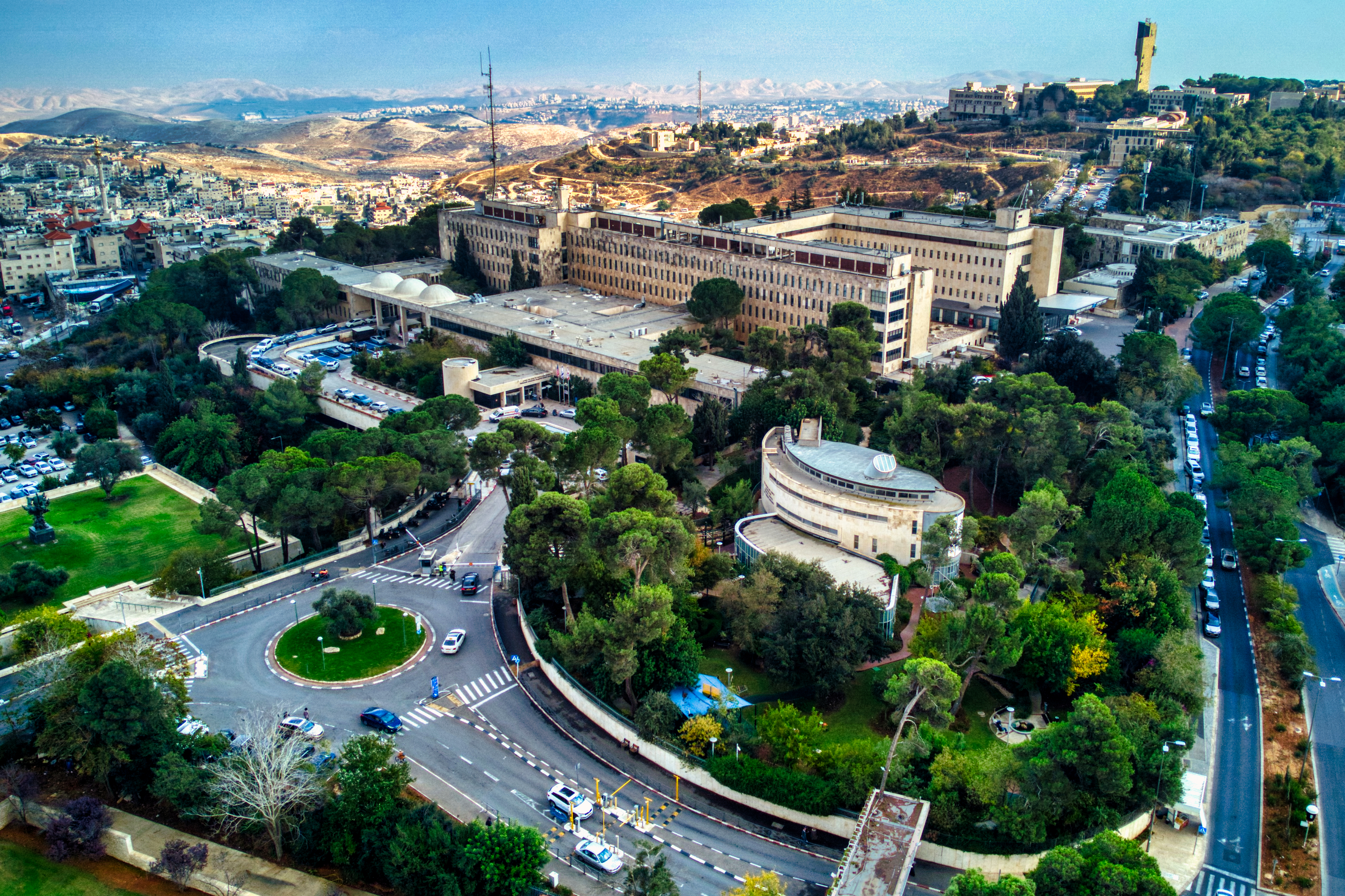
Hadassah University Hospital, Mount Scopus, Jerusalem

Mount Scopus (Note: (Hebrew: הַר הַצּוֹפִים Har HaTsofim, "Mount of the Watchmen/ Sentinels"; Arabic: جبل المشارف Ǧabal al-Mašārif, lit. "Mount Lookout", or جبل المشهد Ǧabal al-Mašhad "Mount of the Scene/Burial Site", or جبل الصوانة "Mount Syenite")) is a mountain located in Jerusalem with an elevation of 826 meters (2,710 ft) above sea level. Between the 1948 Arab–Israeli War and the 1967 Arab–Israeli War, it was an internationally protected exclave of Israel within Jordan, as it was geographically part of Jordan's East Jerusalem, but politically part of Israel's West Jerusalem. It is home to the main campus of the Hebrew University of Jerusalem and Hadassah Medical Center. Since the collapse of the City Line in 1967, the area now lies within Jerusalem's Israeli municipal boundaries.

== Etymology ==
The ridge of mountains east of ancient as well as modern Jerusalem offers the best views of the city, which it dominates. Since the main part of the ridge bears the name Mount of Olives, the name "lookout" was reserved for this peak to the northeast of the ancient city. Its name in many languages (Hebrew, Arabic, Greek and Latin) means "lookout." Scopus is a Latinisation of the Greek word for "watcher", skopos.

The Hebrew name, Har HaTzofim, "Lookout Mountain", is not mentioned in the Hebrew Bible. It first appears in the form of the Greek "ὁ Σκοπός" (skopós) in the works of Josephus (The Jewish War 2.528; 5.67, 106, first century CE) in connection to Alexander the Great and the 70 CE Roman siege. He also writes that its ancient name was Sapha (Σάφα), which has led to a theory that the hills of Safa and Marwa near Mecca, which Muslim pilgrims walk or run between, were originally Scopus/Sapha and Mount Moriah, and the pilgrimage originally took place at Jerusalem.

The Mishnah (third century CE) mentions "Tzofim" in relation to Jerusalem, but it is not at all certain that it means a particular location or rather any point from which the Temple can be seen.

The ancient name Har Hatzofim or Mount Scopus has been affixed to this particular mountain and its peak in the 20th century without the certainty that it corresponds precisely to what Josephus had referred to as Mount Scopus.

== History ==
=== Antiquity ===
Overlooking Jerusalem, Mount Scopus has been strategically important as a base from which to attack the city since antiquity. During the Great Jewish Revolt, the 12th Roman Legion commanded by Cestius, camped there in 66 CE. In 70, at the conclusion of the same war that led to the destruction of the Jewish Temple, Mount Scopus was used as a base to carry out the final siege of the city by the same 12th Legion, plus the 15th and 5th Legions, while the 10th Legion was positioned on the continuation of the same ridge, known as the Mount of Olives. The Crusaders used it as a base in 1099.

=== Modern era ===
The exact location of the mountain known in the ancient sources as Mount Scopus is not known. It is described as being in the north-eastern part of the ridge that prominently includes the Mount of Olives, which dominates Jerusalem from the east. As the Zionist organisations decided to build a new Jewish institution of higher learning in Jerusalem, which eventually became the Hebrew University, they decided that it was unwise to try and ask for donations for a project designed to be built on the Mount of Olives, a location with many Christian connotations.

The site chosen for the university did correspond approximately to the description of the ancient Mount Scopus and so it was decided to name that particular peak "Mount Scopus".

In 1948, as the British began letting go of their security responsibilities, the Jewish enclave on Mount Scopus became increasingly cut off from the main sections of Jewish Jerusalem. Access to the hospital and university campus was through a narrow road, 2.4 kilometres (1.5 mi) long, passing through the Palestinian neighbourhood of Sheikh Jarrah. Arab sniper fire on vehicles moving along the access route became a regular occurrence, and road mines were laid. When food and supplies at the hospital began to dwindle, a large convoy carrying doctors and supplies set out for the besieged hospital, leading to an attack that became known as the Hadassah medical convoy massacre. Seventy-eight Jewish doctors, nurses, students, patients, faculty members, and Haganah, and one British soldier were killed in the attack.

After the ceasefire agreement of November 30, 1948, which established the division of East and West Jerusalem, Israel controlled the western part of the city while Jordan controlled the east. Several demilitarized "no man's land" zones were established along the border, one of them Mount Scopus. Fortnightly convoys carrying supplies to the university and hospital located in the Israeli part of the demilitarized zone on Mount Scopus were periodically held up by Jordanian troops.

Article VIII of the 1949 Armistice Agreements signed by Israel and Jordan in April 1949 called for:

[T]he normal functioning of the cultural and humanitarian institutions on Mount Scopus and free access thereto; free access to the Holy Places and cultural institutions and use of the cemetery on the Mount of Olives; resumption of operation of the Latrun pumping station; provision of electricity for the Old City; and resumption of operation of the railroad to Jerusalem.

In January 1958, Francis Urrutia, a representative of the UN Secretary-General, tried to persuade Jordan to abide by Article VIII, but without success. In May 1958, Jordanian soldiers fired on Israeli patrols, killing a UN officer and four Israeli policemen.

Mount Scopus was not a traditional exclave. There were two versions of the demilitarization agreement: one was initialed by Franklyn M. Begley, a UN official; the local Jordanian commander; and the Israeli local commander; while the other was not initialed by the Israeli local commander. Having two versions of the map was the cause of many incidents within the Mount Scopus area.

[W]ithin the Mount Scopus enclave Israel lacked many aspects of the traditional concept of sovereignty: it could not control cross-border movements (interdependence sovereignty); it lacked de jure and de facto control of the area (Vattelian sovereignty) as the area was subject to UN control; and it arguably also lacked recognition on the part of all those who lived within the bounds of the enclave, as it would be presumptuous to assume that the inhabitants of the Arab village of Issawiya, which was located within the enclave, would have recognized Israel (domestic sovereignty).

Seen from the Israeli perspective, which is easier to adopt due to archival accessibility, one may say that every move that the state of Israel made within the bounds of the enclave was designed to assert its sovereignty while at the same time consolidating and expanding its territory. Put differently, sovereignty – and not its absence – appears to be the fundamental issue that governed all developments throughout the enclave's existence.

Ralph Bunche, assistant to UN Secretary-General Dag Hammarskjöld, visited Jerusalem and Amman to find a solution, followed by Hammarskjöld himself, again unsuccessfully. The Mount Scopus Agreement signed on July 7, 1948, regulated the demilitarised zone around Mount Scopus and authorized the United Nations Truce Supervision Organization to settle disputes between the Israelis and Jordanians.

Two Jewish-owned plots in Issawiya known as Salomons Garden were purchased by Mrs. V.F. Salomons in 1934 and sold to the Gan Shlomit Company, Ltd. in 1937. It was surrounded by a fence, but clashes erupted when Arabs living on the other side of the fence sought to cultivate land, pick olives, and carry out repairs on homes close to the fence. The Arabs were requested not to work closer than fifty metres from the fence unless prior permission was granted by the Israeli police.

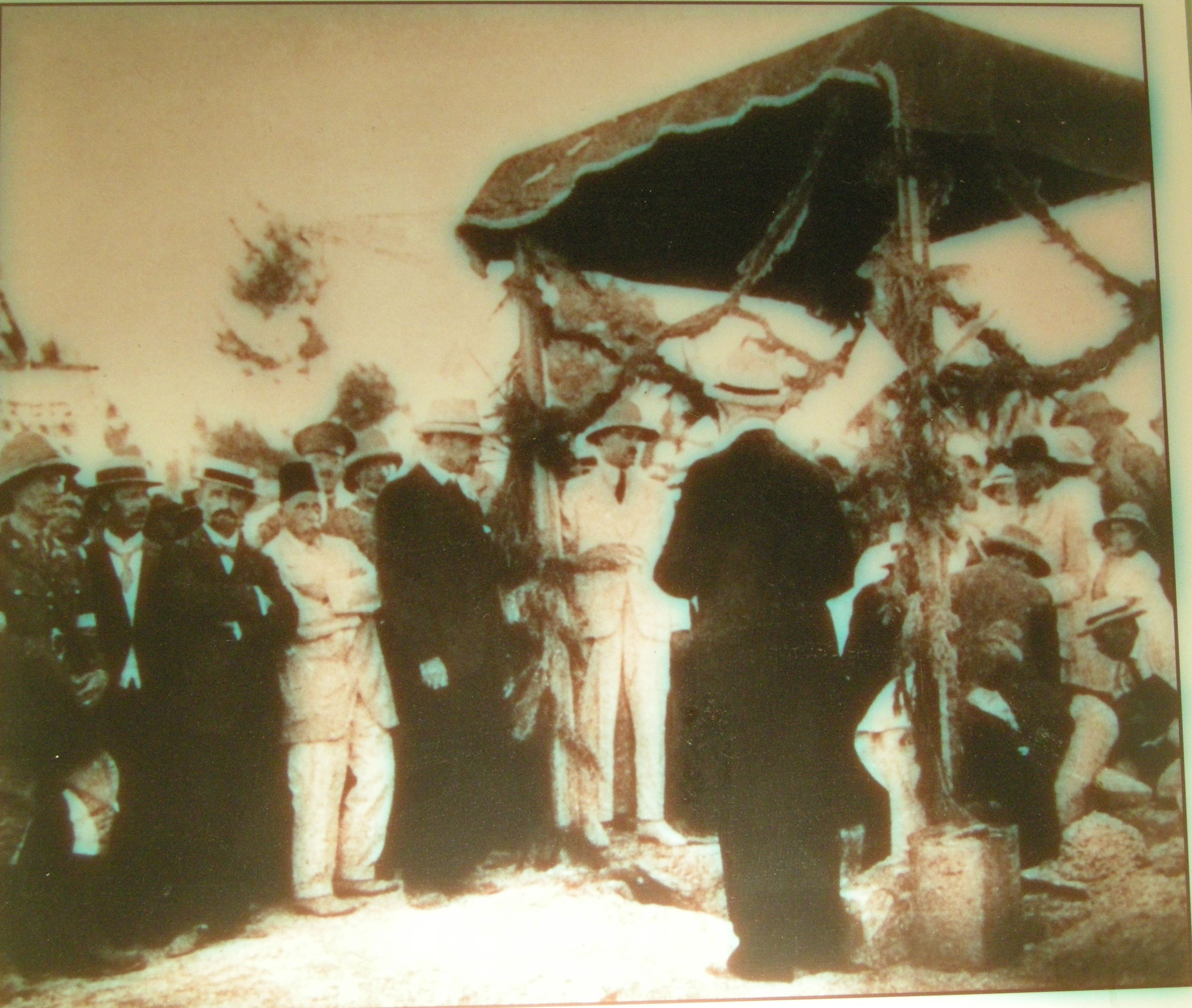
Hebrew University cornerstone ceremony, 1918

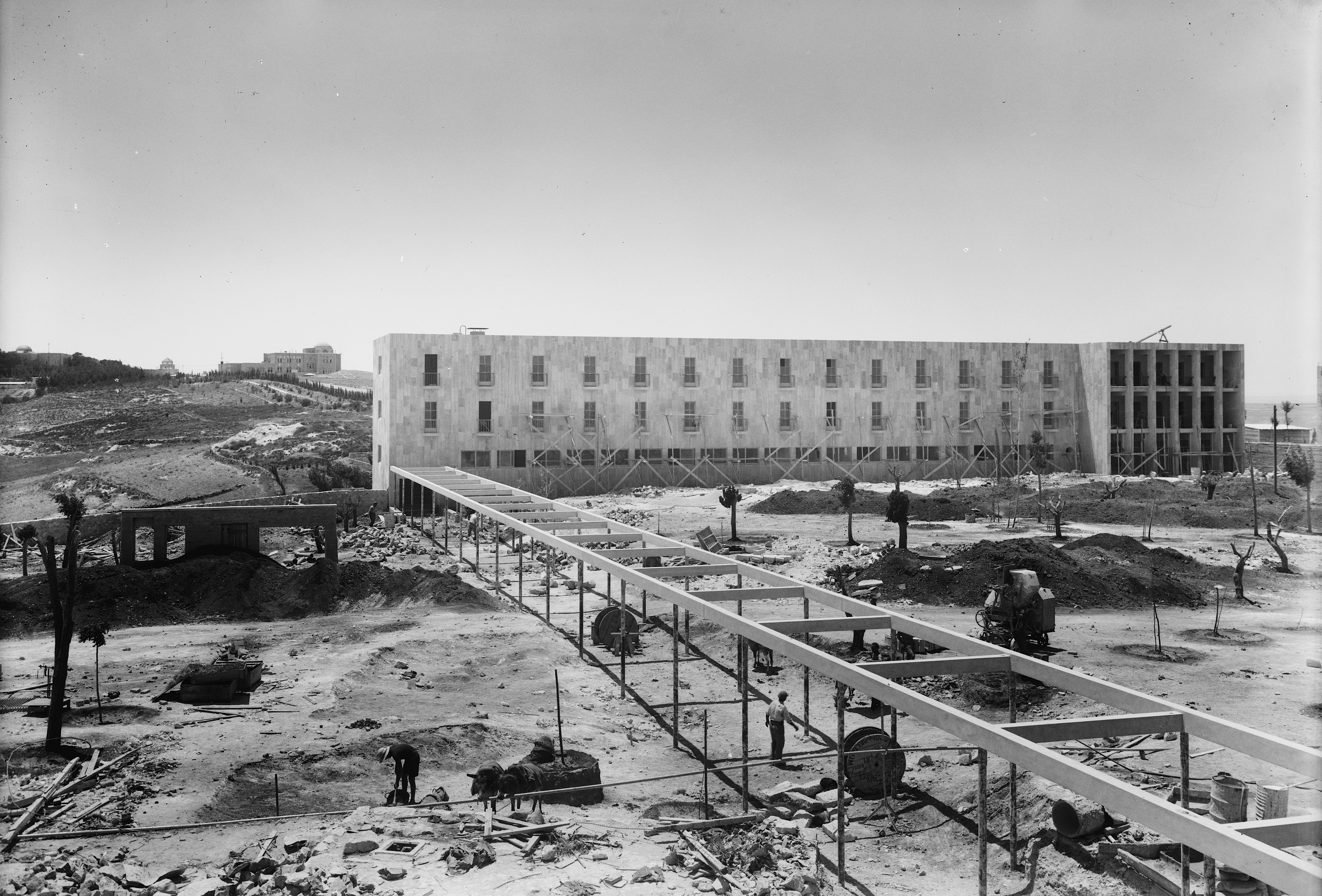
Hadassah nursing school under construction, c. 1934

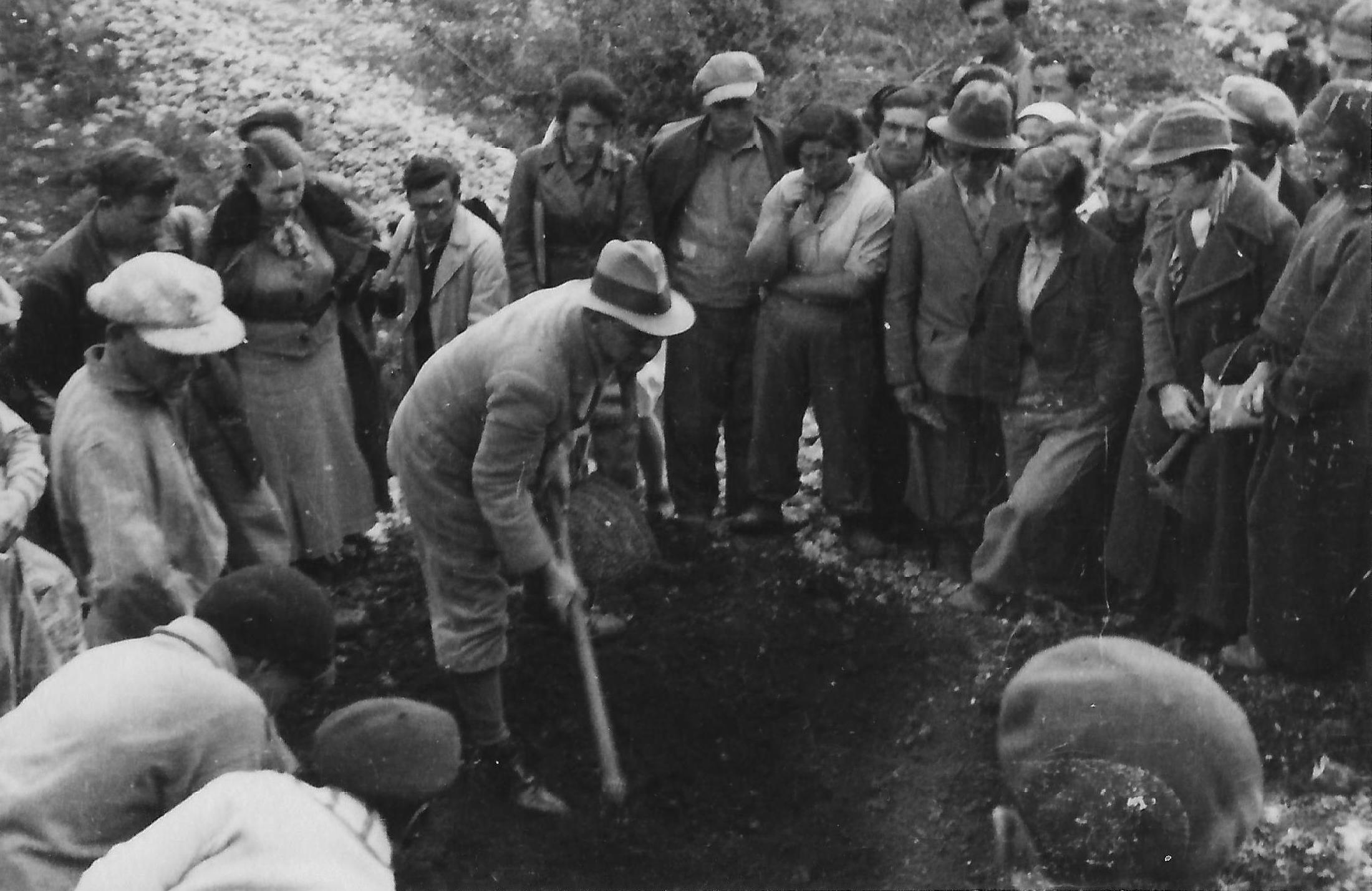
The Botanist Alexander Eig established the National Botanical Garden of Israel in 1931.

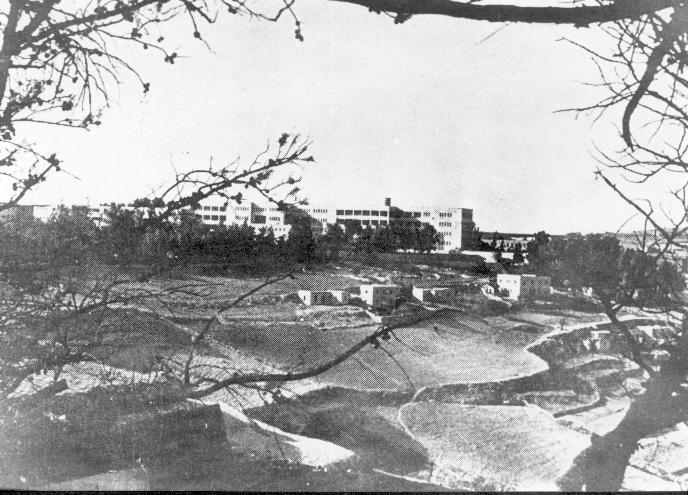
Mount Scopus 1948

== Landmarks ==
=== Hebrew University of Jerusalem ===
Construction of the Mount Scopus campus of the Hebrew University began in 1918 on land purchased from the Gray Hill estate. The dedication ceremony was held in 1925 in the presence of many dignitaries. A design for the university campus by Sir Patrick Geddes positioned the university buildings on the slopes of the mount, below a domed, hexagonal Great Hall recalling the Star of David, as a counterpoint to the octagonal Dome of the Rock in the Old City. This plan was never implemented, but Geddes designed the university Library, today the Hebrew University Faculty of Law on Mount Scopus.

By 1947, the university was a solid research and teaching institution with humanities, science, medicine, education and agriculture departments (in Rehovot), a national library, a university press and an adult education center. The university had a student population of over 1,000 and 200 faculty members.

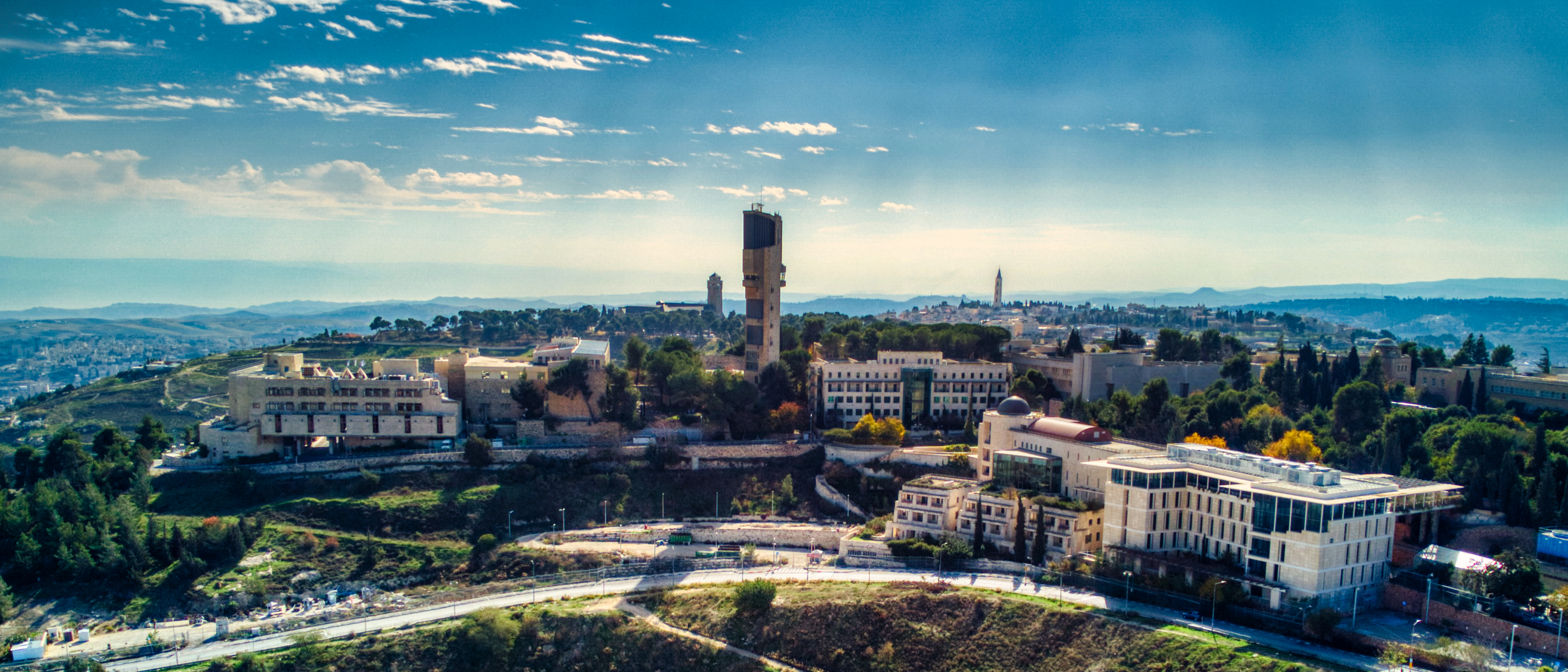
Mount Scopus campus of the Hebrew University

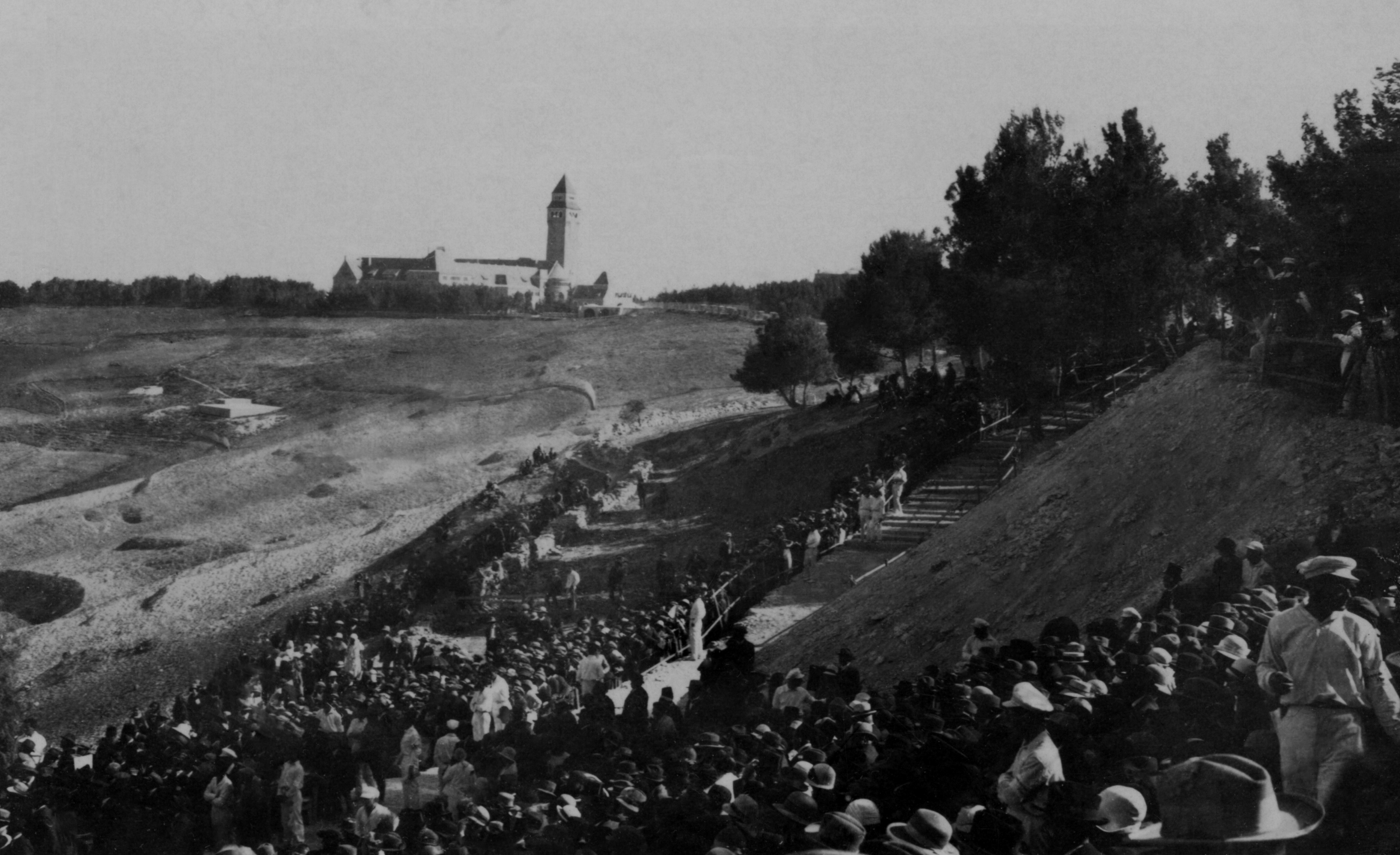
The opening ceremony of the Hebrew University campus on Mount Scopus, 1925

==== Bezalel Academy of Arts and Design ====
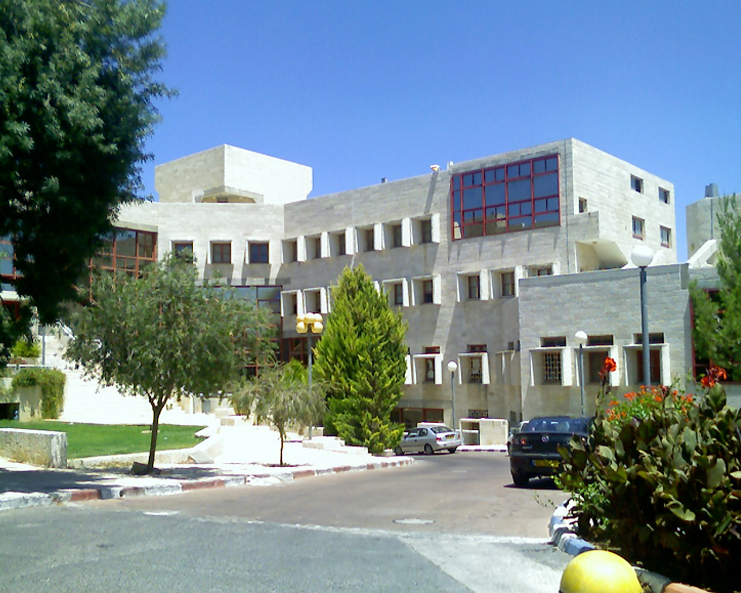
Bazalel campus on Mount Scopus

Bezalel Academy of Arts and Design is Israel's national school of art, founded in 1906 by Boris Schatz. It is named for the Biblical figure Bezalel (Hebrew: בְּצַלְאֵל, romanized: Bəṣalēl), who was appointed by Moses to oversee the design and construction of the Tabernacle in Exodus 35:30-35.

The university's main campus was located on Mount Scopus from 1990 to 2023.

==== Cave of Nicanor ====
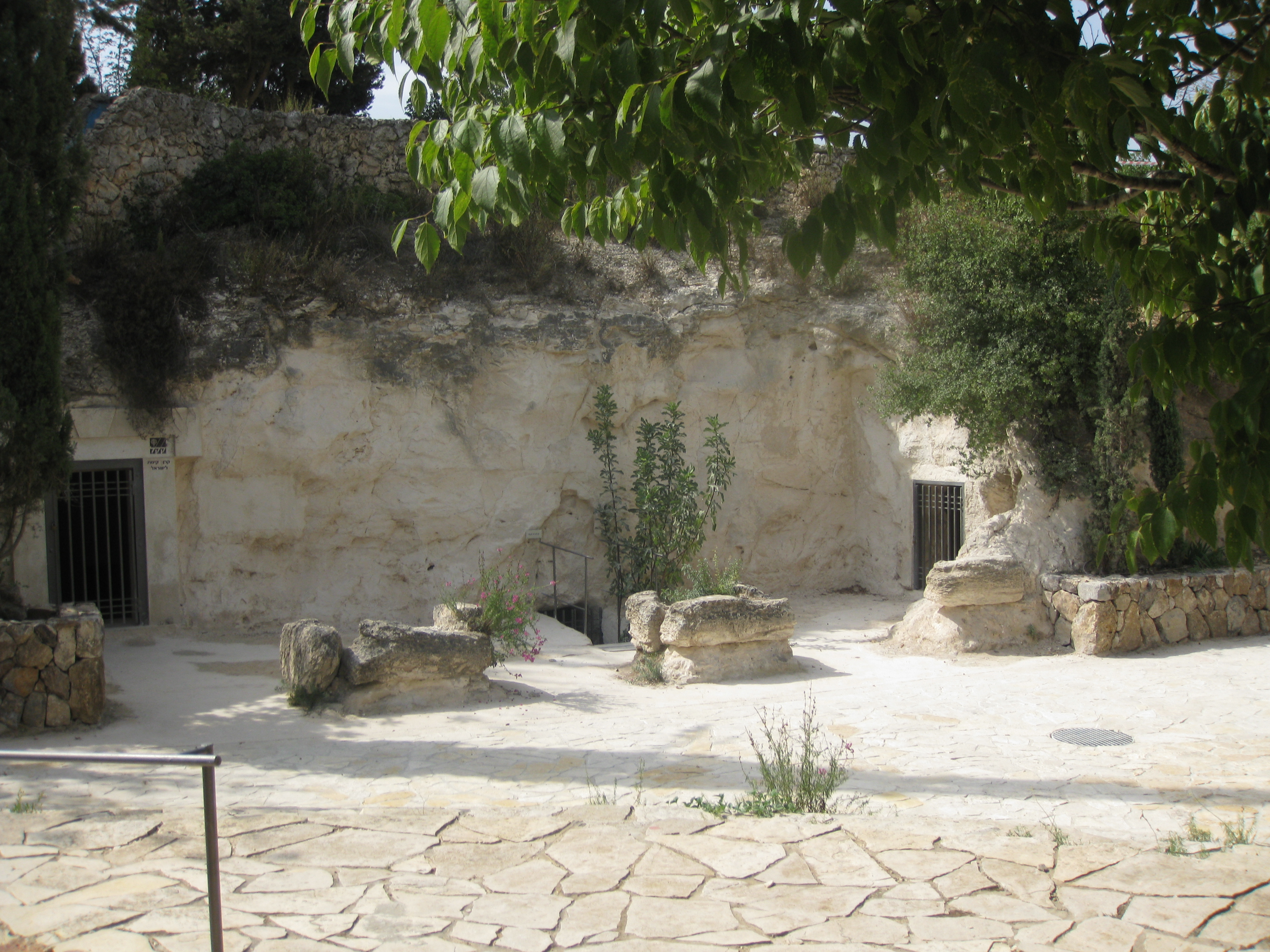
Cave of Nicanor

The Cave of Nicanor is an ancient burial cave located on Mount Scopus in Jerusalem, Israel. Excavations in the cave discovered an ossuary referring to "Nicanor the door maker". He has been identified as Nicanor of Alexandria, who donated one of the gates of Herod's Temple. The cave is located in the National Botanic Garden of Israel.

There was a plan to use the Cave of Nicanor as a national Pantheon of Zionism, but due to circumstances (the area of Mount Scopus after receipt of Israel's independence was an enclave, surrounded by the West Bank territorial possessions of Jordan), this project was not implemented. Only two of Zionist leaders – Leon Pinsker and Menachem Ussishkin – were interred inside the ancient tomb. After 1948, the national cemetery was created on Mount Herzl, closer to the centre of West Jerusalem.

==== Hadassah Medical Center ====
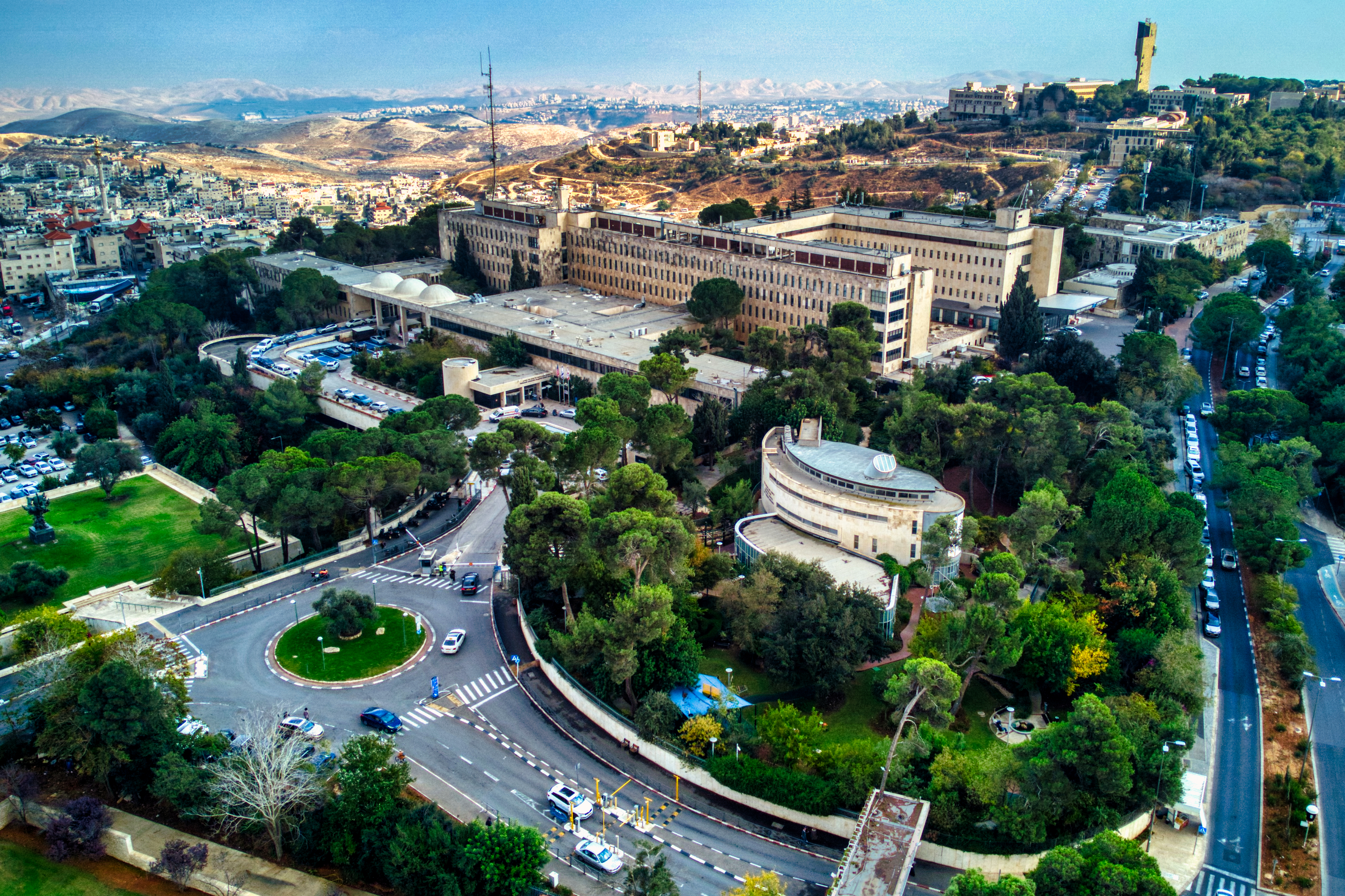
Haddasah Hospital Mount Scopus

In 1939, the Hadassah Women's Organization opened a teaching hospital on Mount Scopus in a building designed by architect Erich Mendelsohn. In 1948, when the Jordanians occupied East Jerusalem and blockaded the road to Mount Scopus, the hospital could no longer function. In 1960, after running clinics in various locations, the organization opened a medical center on the other side of the city, in Jerusalem's Ein Karem neighborhood. On April 13, 1948, a civilian convoy bringing medical supplies and personnel to Hadassah Hospital on Mount Scopus was attacked by Arab forces. Seventy-eight Jews, mainly doctors and nurses, were killed in the ambush.

==== Hecht Synagogue ====
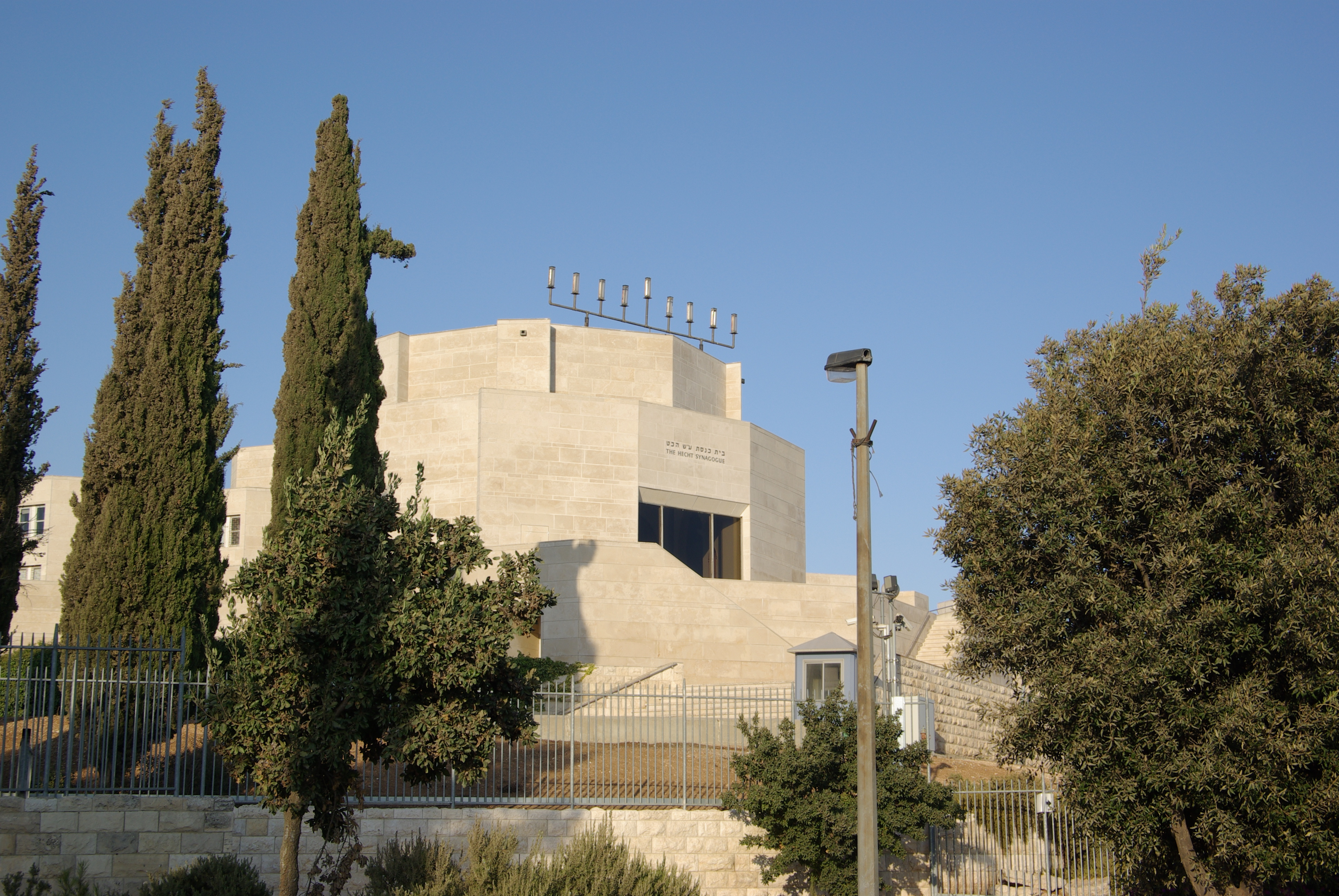
Hecht Synagogue

The Hecht Synagogue, a large noticeable building on the south-west corner of the campus, was erected by the family of Mayer Jacob "Chic" Hecht (1928–2006), a Republican United States Senator from Nevada and U.S. Ambassador to the Bahamas. It is noted for the unique arrangement of the Torah ark and the panoramic view of the Old City from a huge window.

==== National Botanical Garden of Israel ====
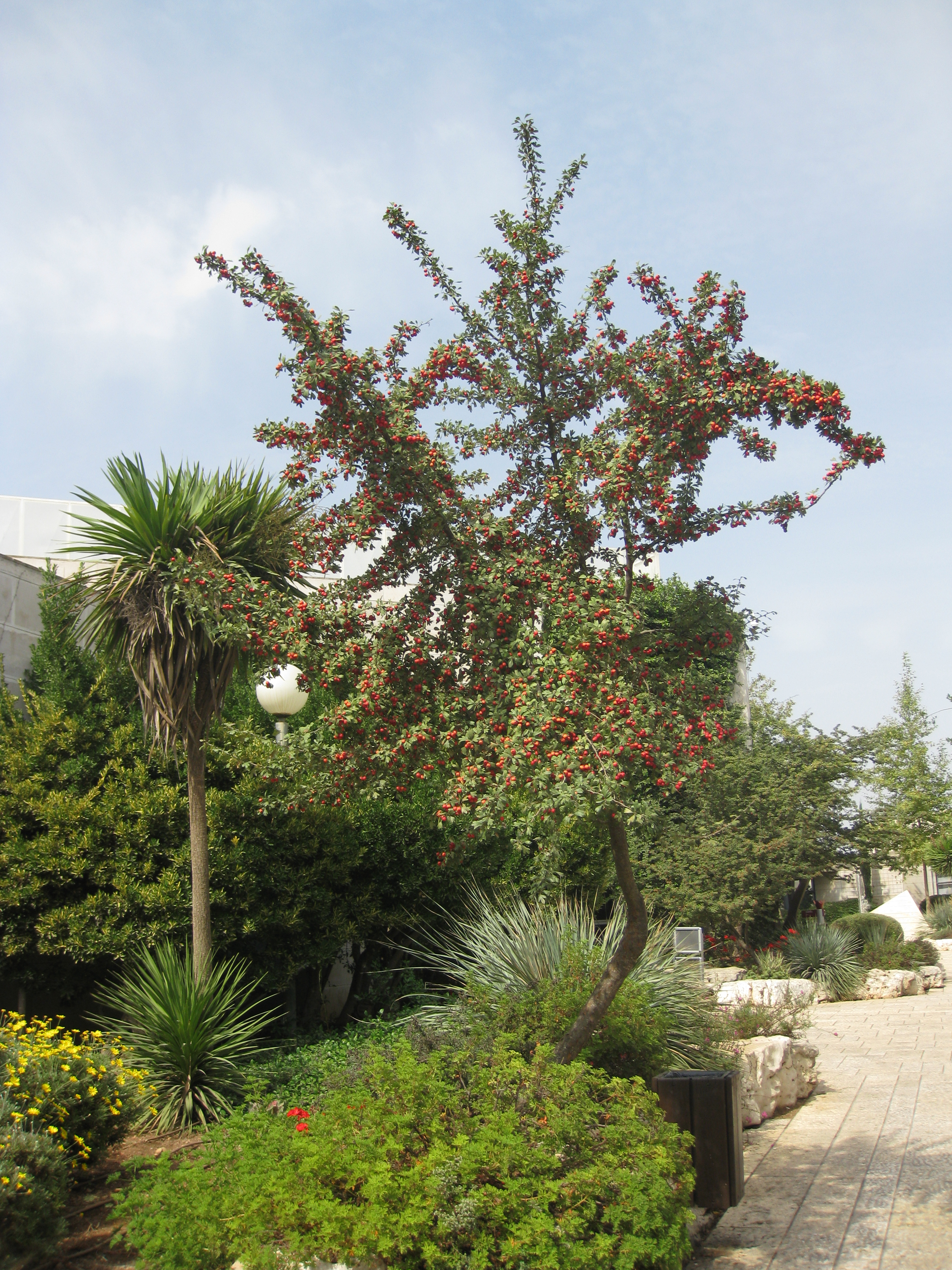
National Botanic Garden of Israel

The National Botanic Garden of Israel, also called the Land of Israel Botanic Garden, was founded on the grounds of the Hebrew University on Mount Scopus by botanist Alexander Eig in 1931. This garden contains one of the largest collections of Israeli uncultivated plants. This was the first home of the Jerusalem Biblical Zoo. A cave in the garden has been identified as the Tomb of Nicanor (see above).

=== Jerusalem British War Cemetery ===
The Jerusalem British war cemetery is a military cemetery for fallen soldiers of the British Empire, later known as the Commonwealth of Nations, in World War I in Mandatory Palestine. The cemetery is located on the neck of land on the north end of the Mount of Olives and west of Mount Scopus.

Buried in the cemetery were 2,515 fallen soldiers, of whom 2,449 were war dead, including 2,218 British casualties. A total of 100 fallen soldiers are unidentified.

A memorial was placed in the cemetery to 3,300 service personnel killed in operations in Palestine and Egypt who have no known grave. In all, commemorated in this cemetery are 5815 service personnel of World War I. No casualties buried in the cemetery died after the war.

=== Kiryat Menachem Begin ===
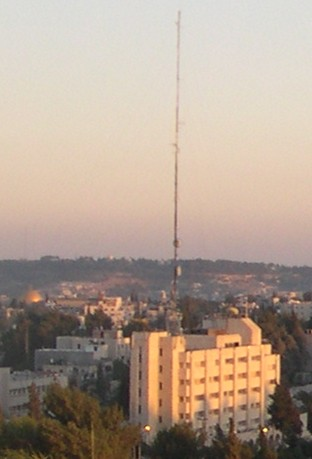
Kiryat Menachem Begin

Kiryat Menachem Begin, named after former Israeli Prime Minister Menachem Begin and also known as Kiryat HaMemshala, is a complex of government buildings in East Jerusalem located between Sheikh Jarrah in the north, adjacent to Mount Scopus in the east and Ammunition Hill in the west. It serves as home to several government offices, along with the main government complex in Givat Ram. It also includes the National Headquarters of the Israel Police.

=== Tabachnik Garden ===
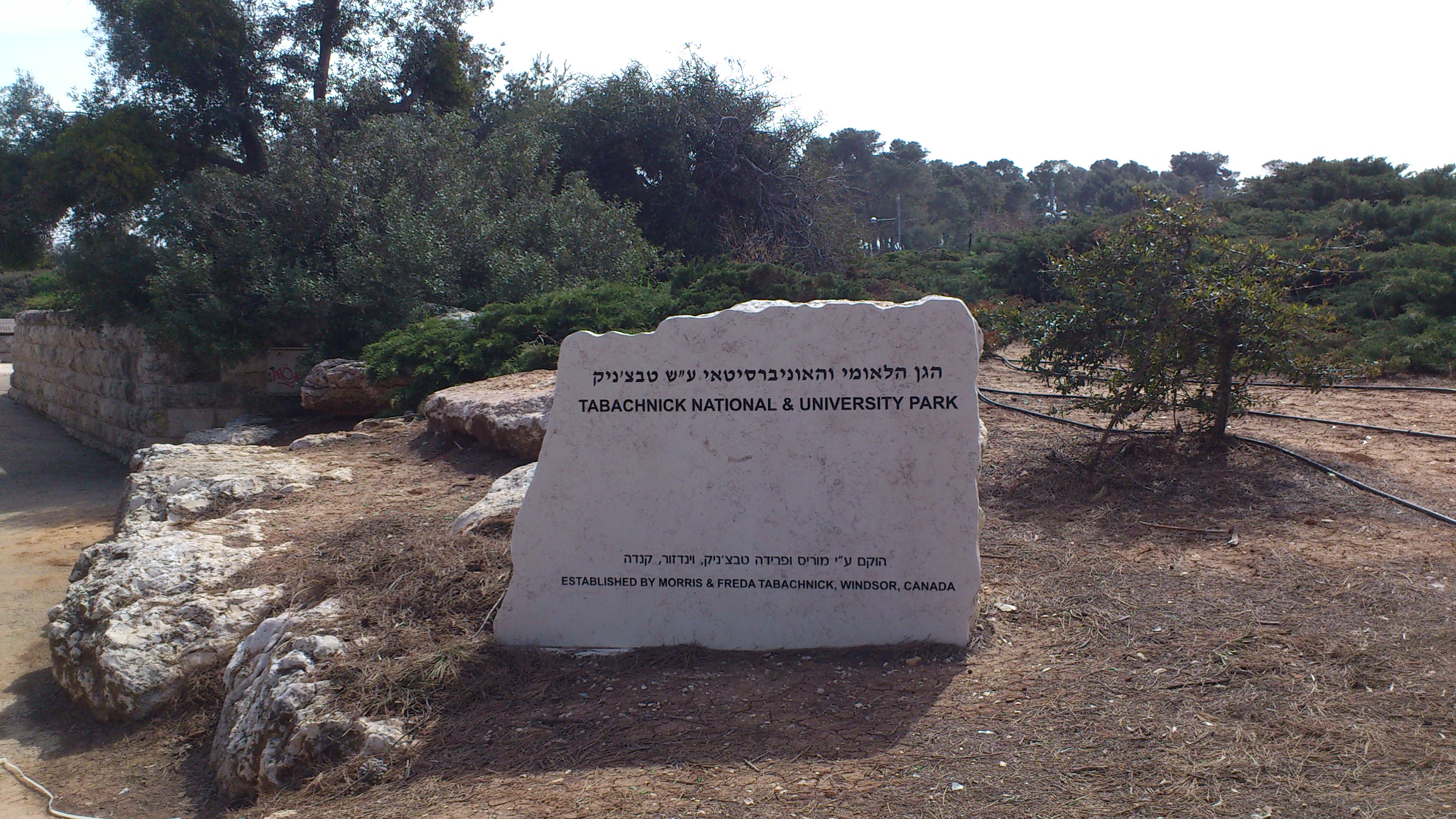
Tabachnik Garden

Tabachnik Garden is a National Park located on the southern slopes of Mount Scopus, next to the Hebrew University. The park preserves some Jewish burial caves from the Second Temple period and it also contains two smaller cemeteries, the Bentwich Cemetery and one of the cemeteries of the American Colony. Inside the park there are two lookouts, one facing eastward towards the Dead Sea and the Judean Desert, the other westward towards the Temple Mount.

==== Jerusalem American Colony Cemetery ====
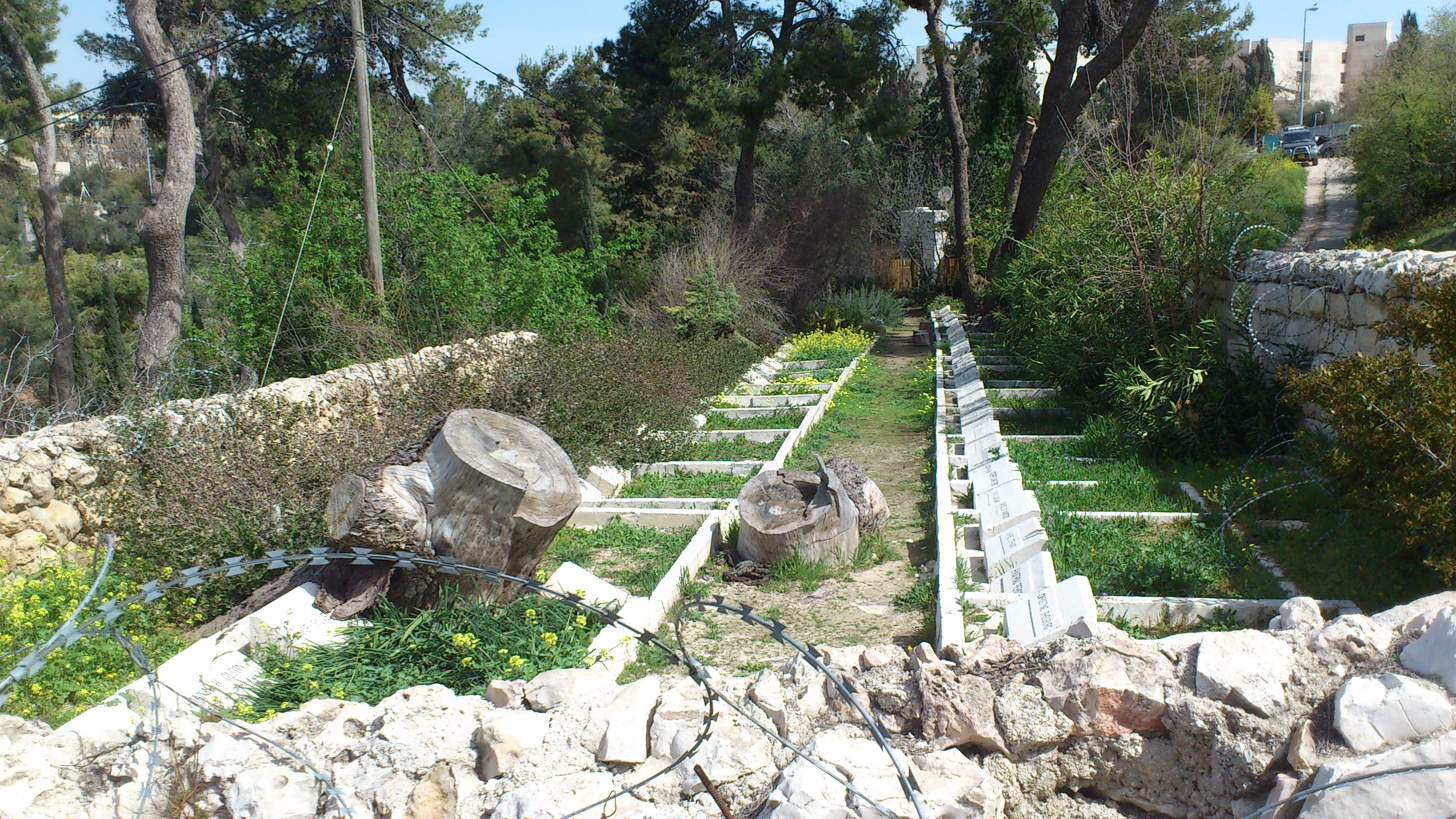
American Colony Cemetery

The American Colony Cemetery on Mount Scopus is the main cemetery of Jerusalem's American Colony, located next to the Hebrew University in the Tabachnik Garden. Among those buried there are Anna Spafford and Jacob Spafford (1864–1932), born in Ramallah as Jacob Eliahu into a Turkish Jewish family, adoptive son of Horatio and Anna Spafford and discoverer of the Siloam inscription.

==== Bentwich Cemetery ====
A small cemetery, dedicated to Herbert Bentwich and his family, is located beside the American Colony Cemetery in Tabachnik Garden.

=== Ammunition Hill ===
Ammunition Hill was a fortified Jordanian military post in the north-west side of Mount Scopus in Jerusalem that was in the northern part of Jordanian East Jerusalem. It was the site of one of the fiercest battles of the Six-Day War.

== Gallery ==
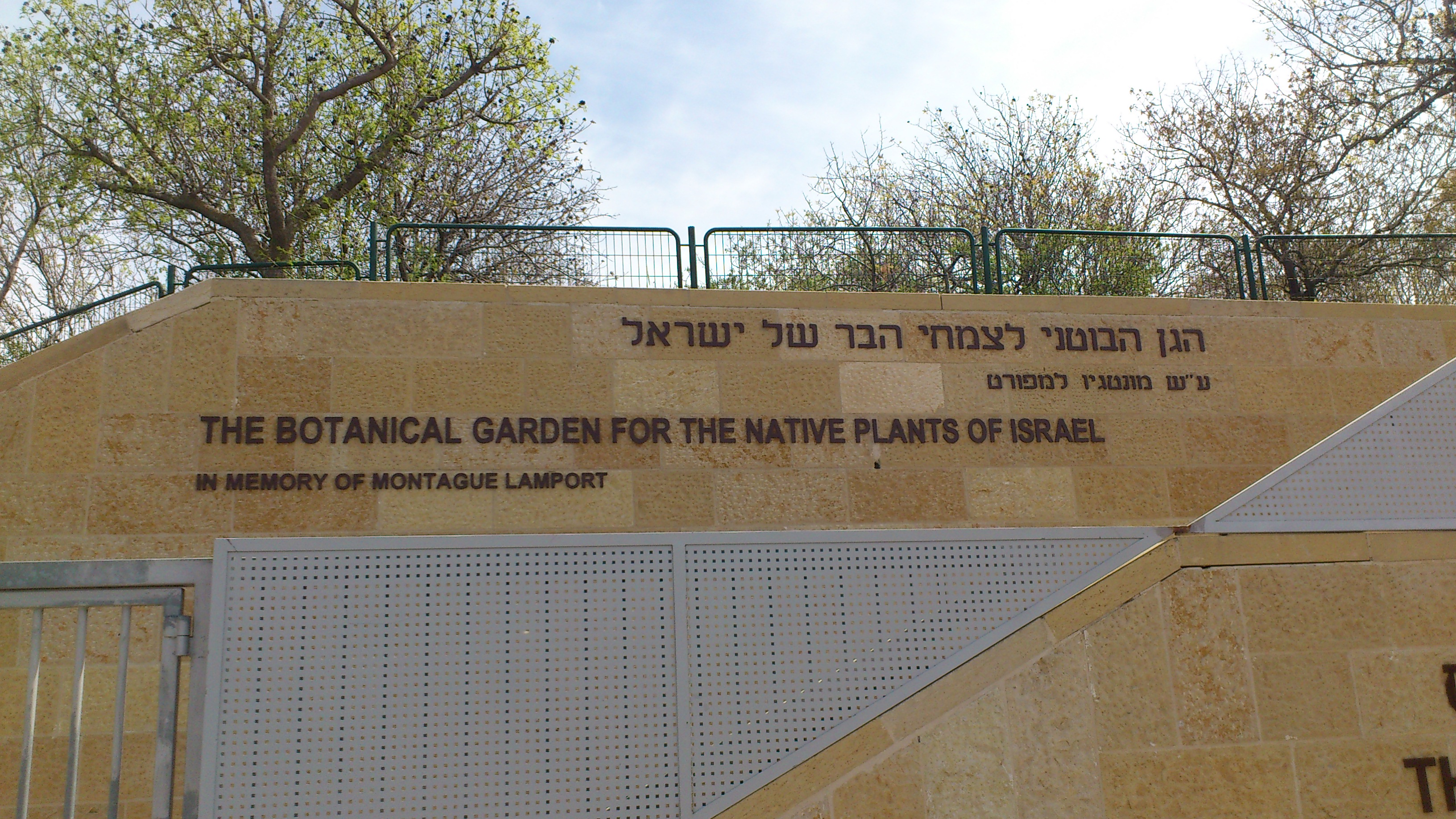
The National Botanic Garden of Israel

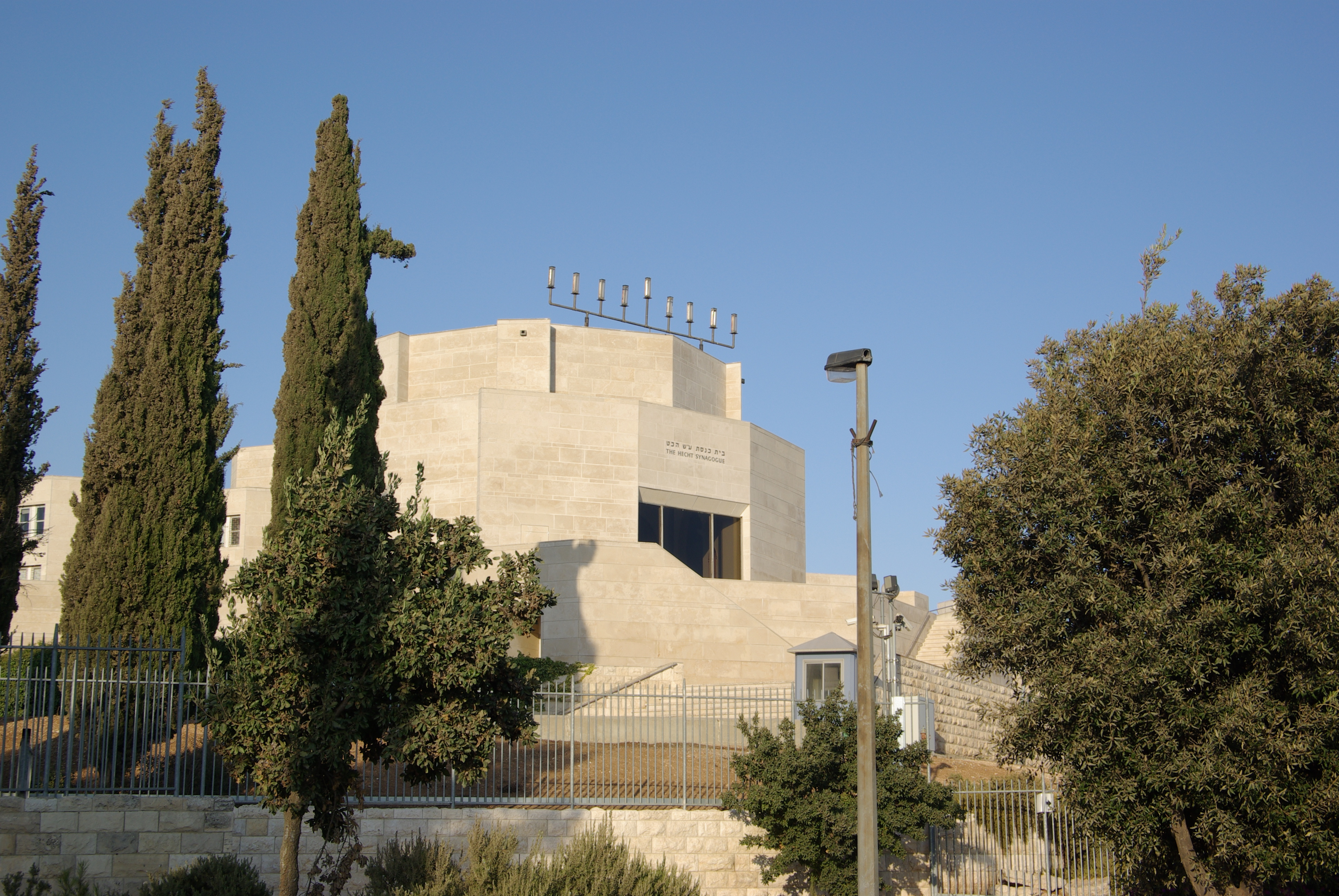
Hecht Synagogue

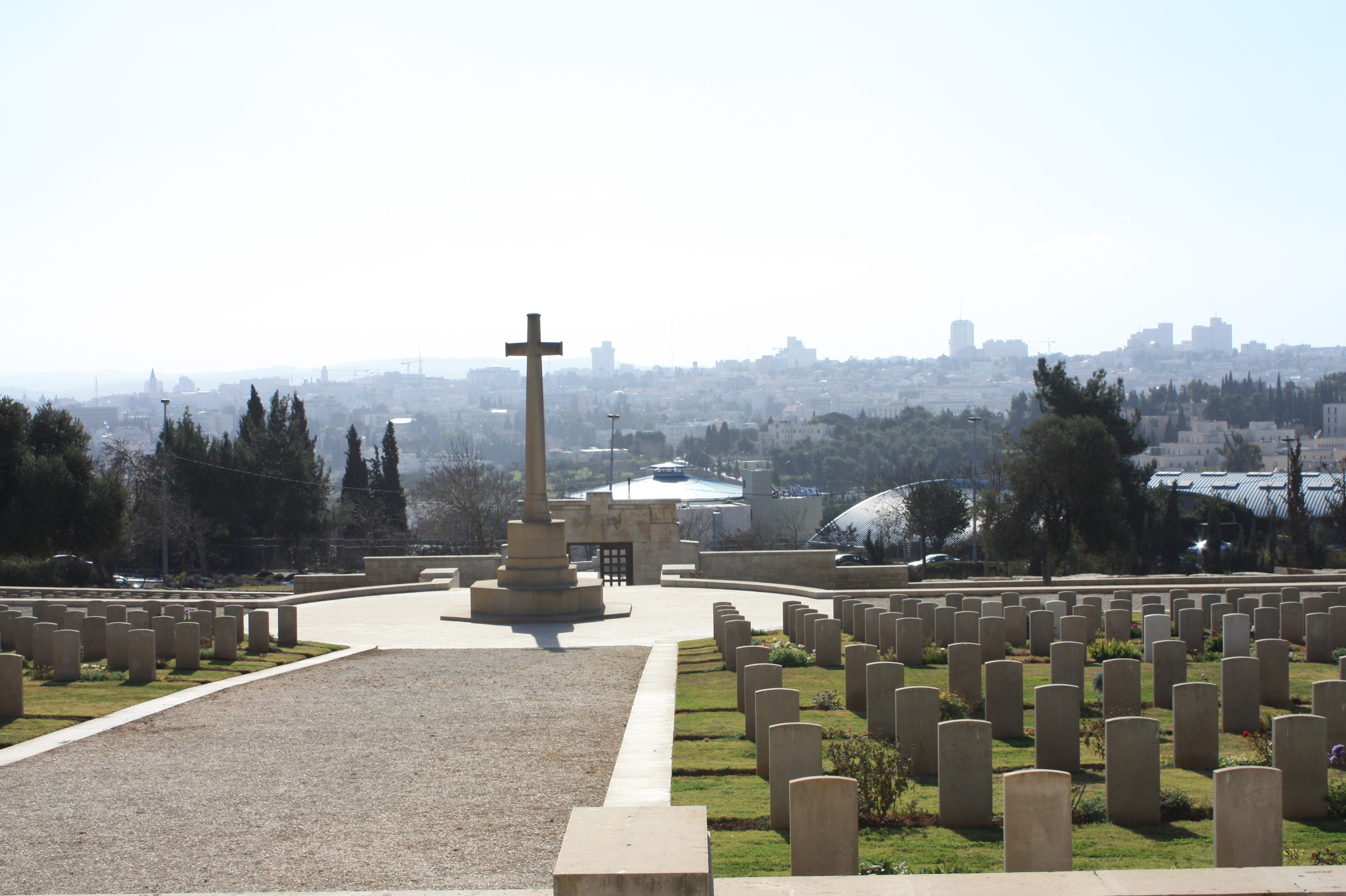
Jerusalem British War Cemetery

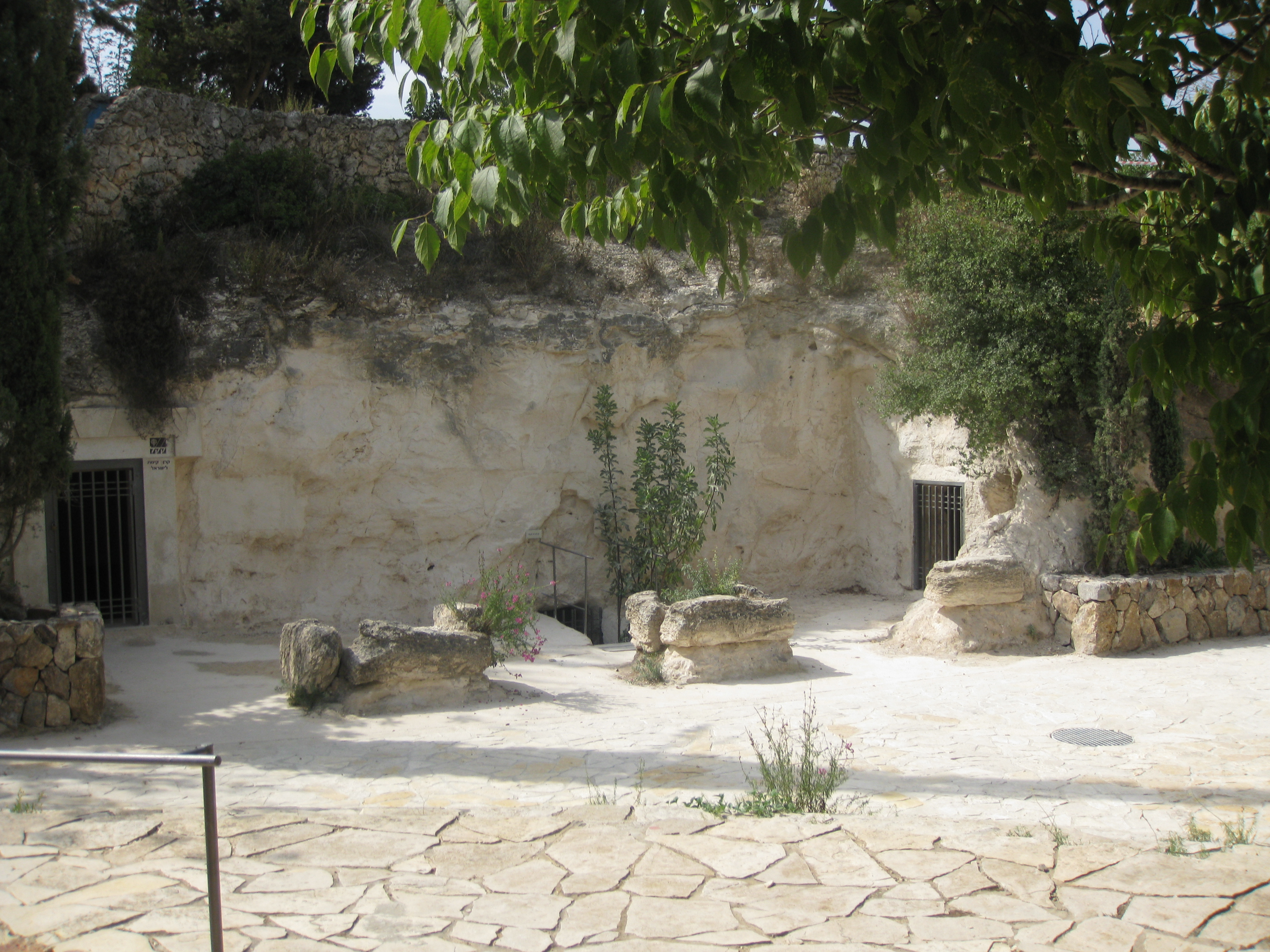
Cave of Nicanor

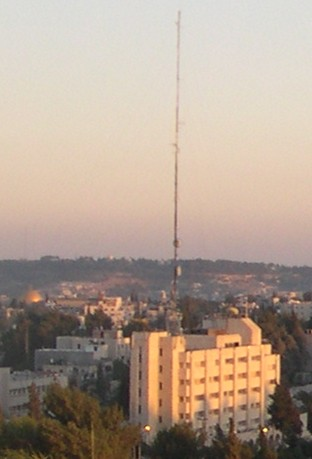
National Headquarters of the Israel Police

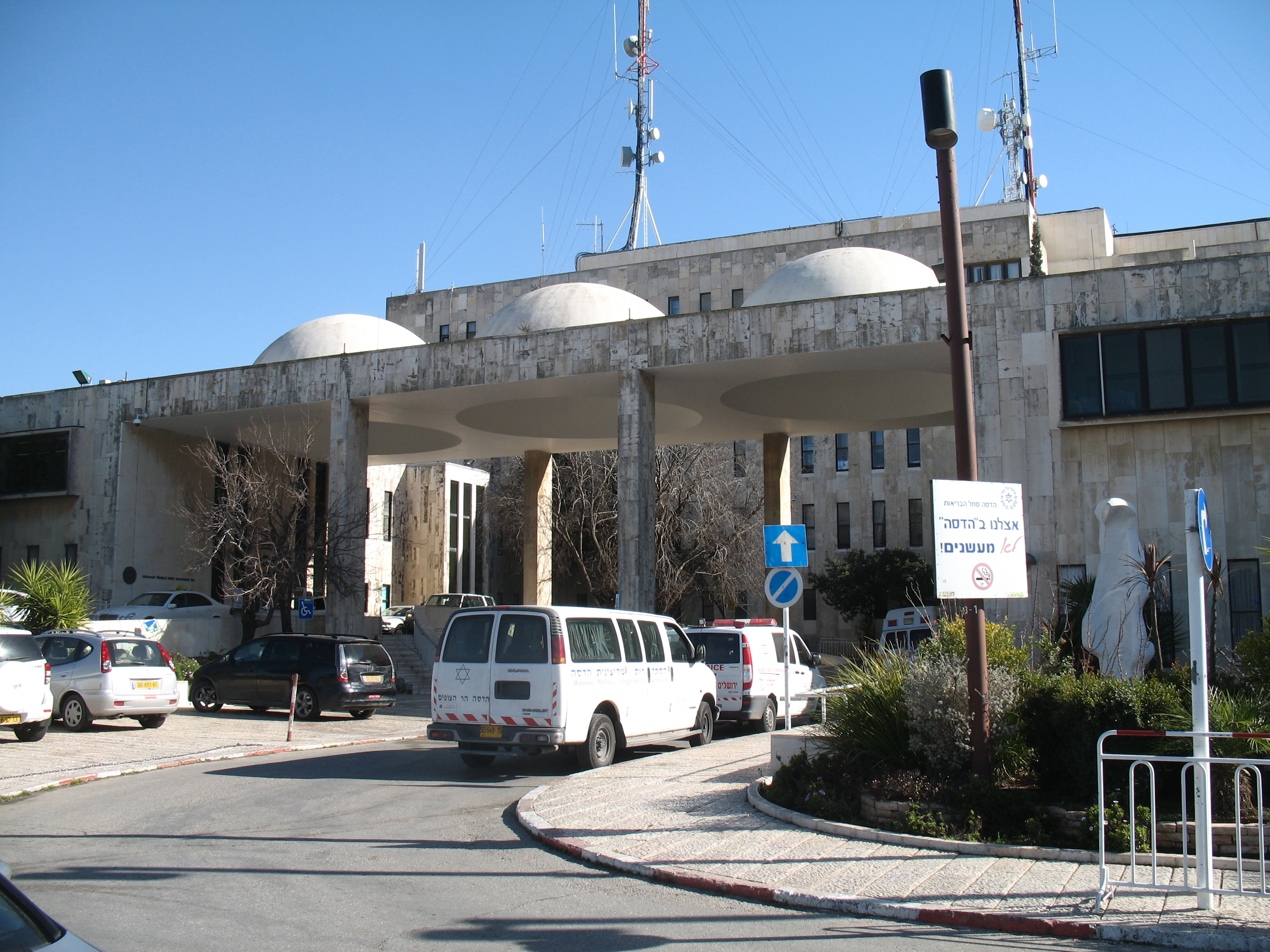
Hadassah Hospital – Mount Scopus

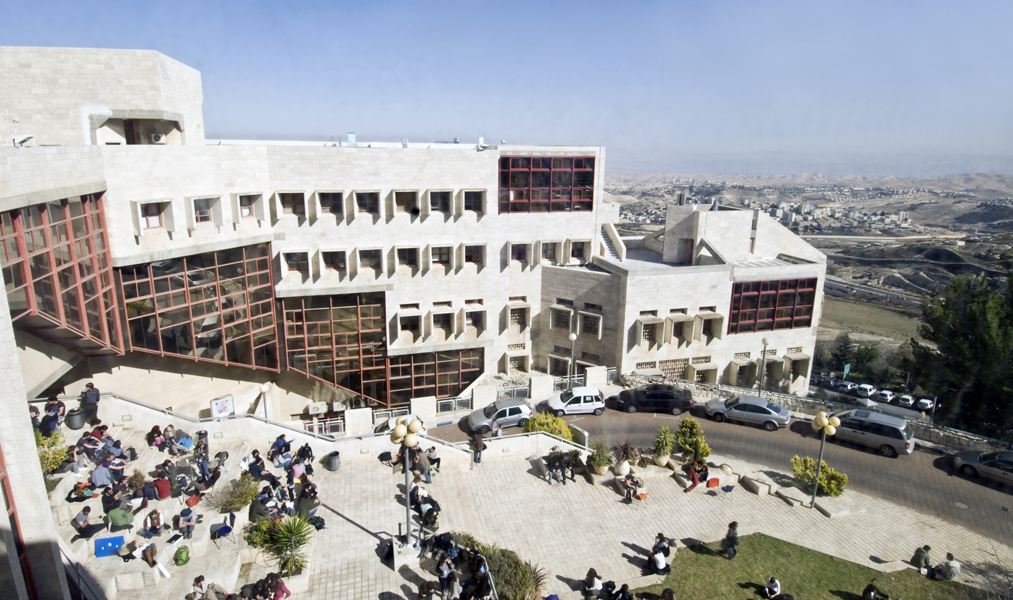
Bezalel Academy of Art and Design

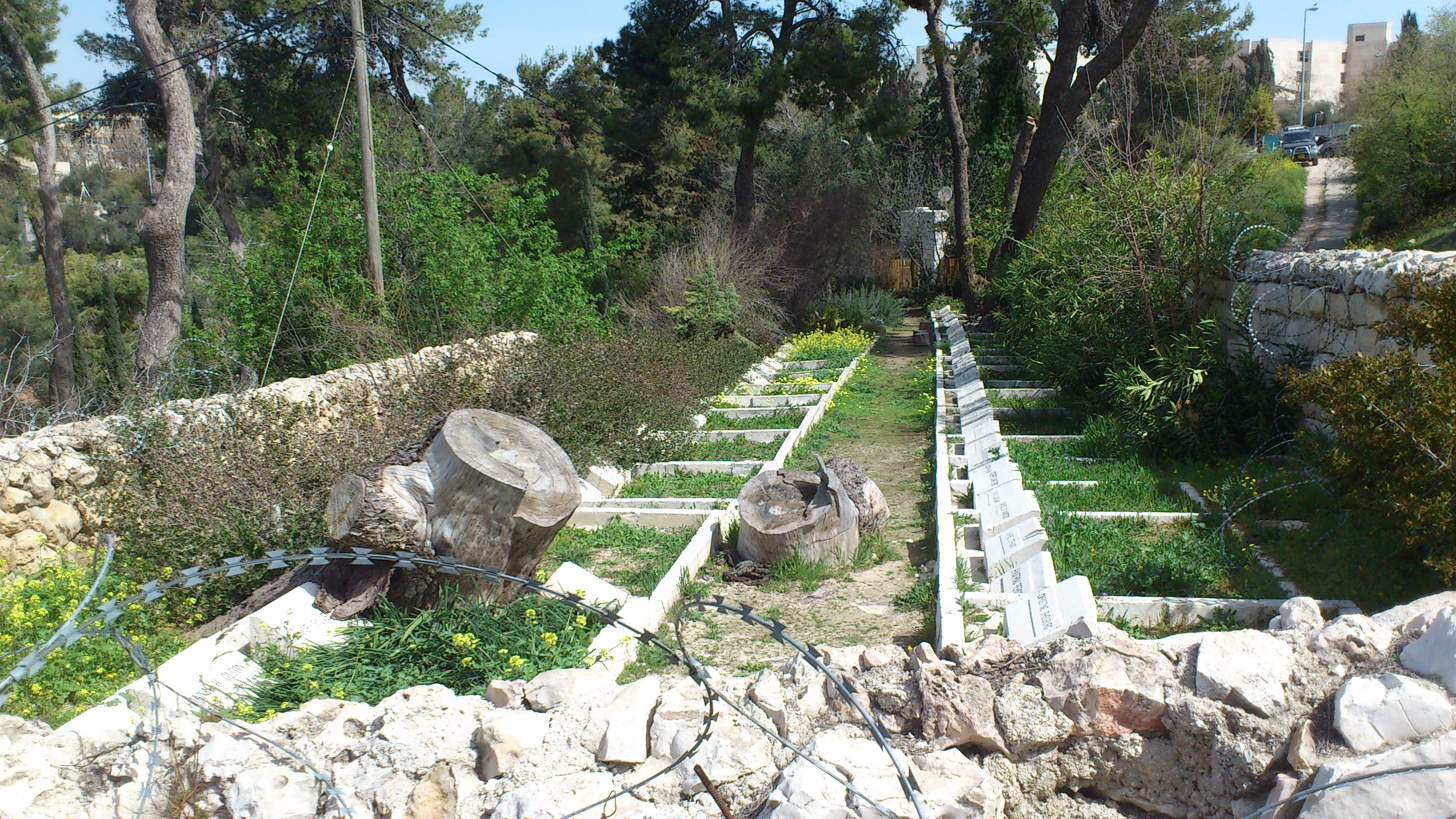
Jerusalem American Colony Cemetery

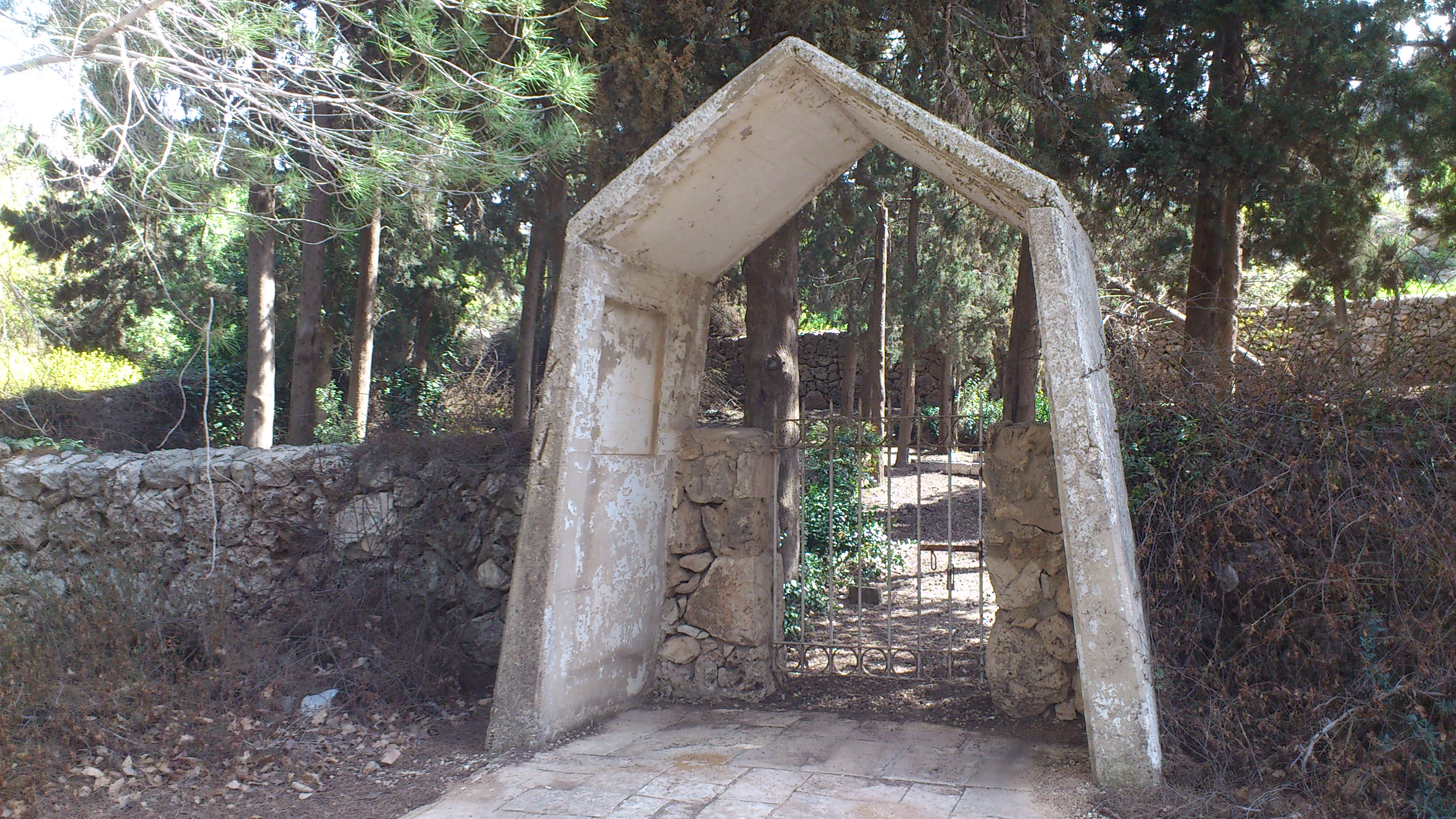
Bentwich Cemetery

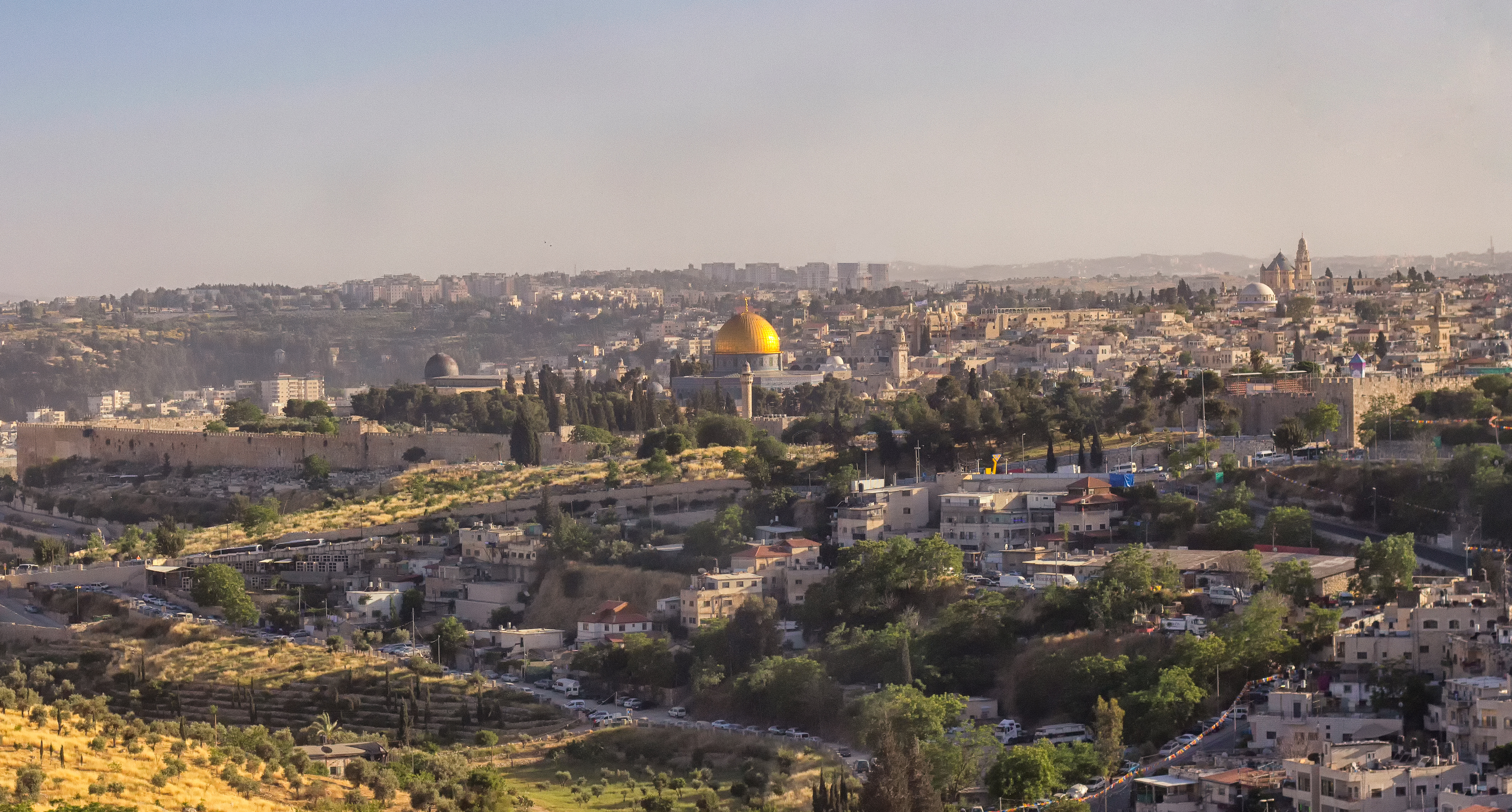
View of the Old City of Jerusalem as seen from Mount Scopus

== See also ==
- Scopus stone vessels cave
