= Chaya (Hebrew given name) =

Chaya is a Hebrew female given name (Hebrew: חַיָּה Ḥayyah, Classical Hebrew: [ħajˈjaː], Israeli Hebrew: [ˈχaja, ħaˈja]; English pronunciations: /ˈhɑːjɑː/ HAH-yah, /ˈxɑːjɑː/ KHAH-yah). With its literal meaning "living", it is considered to be a feminine counterpart of the Hebrew masculine given name Haim. It has a number of other transliterations: Chaja, Haya, Khaya, Haia. East Slavic spelling: Хая.

Approximately before 1920s, for Ashkenazi Jews in Europe it was customary to record legal names of females in diminutive form. In the case of Chaya these were Chayka (Hebrew: חייקה), Chaika, Chajka, Khaika, Khayka, etc. East Slavic spelling: Хайка. In Latin, the name becomes Vita, and in Spanish Vida. Variants in Yiddish, among the Ashkenazi diaspora, the equivalent name was Vite, Yitta or Yetta.

Notable people with the given name include:

== Variants of Chaya ==
- Chaja Florentin, interviewed in the 2009 German documentary Chaja & Mimi
- Chaja Goldstein (1908–1999), Polish-born Dutch dancer and singer
- Chaja Rubinstein, birth name of Helena Rubinstein (1872–1965), Polish-born American business magnate
- Chaya Arbel (1921–2007), Israeli composer
- Chaya Clara Heyn (1924–1998), Israeli botanist and professor
- Chaya Czernowin (born 1957), Israeli composer
- Chaya Schwartz (1921–2007), Israeli artist, recipient of several Dizengoff Prizes
- Chaya Gusfield, American attorney and rabbi
- Chaya Kaufman, birth name of Ariel Durant (1898–1981), Ukrainian-born American researcher and writer
- Chaya Lispector, birth name of Clarice Lispector (1920–1977), Ukrainian-born Brazilian novelist and short story writer
- Chaya Mushka Schneersohn (fl. 1860), member of the Chabad-Lubavitch Hasidic dynasty
- Chaya Mushka Schneerson (1901–1988), member of the Chabad-Lubavitch Hasidic dynasty
- Chaya Raichik (born 1995), American blogger and owner of Libs of TikTok
- Haia Lifșiț (1903–1929), Russian Empire-born Romanian communist
- Haya Freedman (1923–2005), Polish-born Israeli mathematician
- Haya Harareet (1931–2021), Israeli actress
- Haya Kaspi (born 1948), Israeli mathematician
- Haya Shalom (born 1944), Israeli lesbian feminist and human rights activist
- Haya Shenhav (born 1936), Israeli author of stories and poems for both children and adults

== Variants of Chayka ==
- Chajka, (died 1781), mistress of the Polish king Stanisław August Poniatowski
- Chajka Klinger (1917–1958), Jewish Holocaust resistance fighter
- Haika Grossman (1919–1996), Israeli politician, member of Knesset

== See also ==
- All pages in Hebrew Wikipedia starting with חיה
