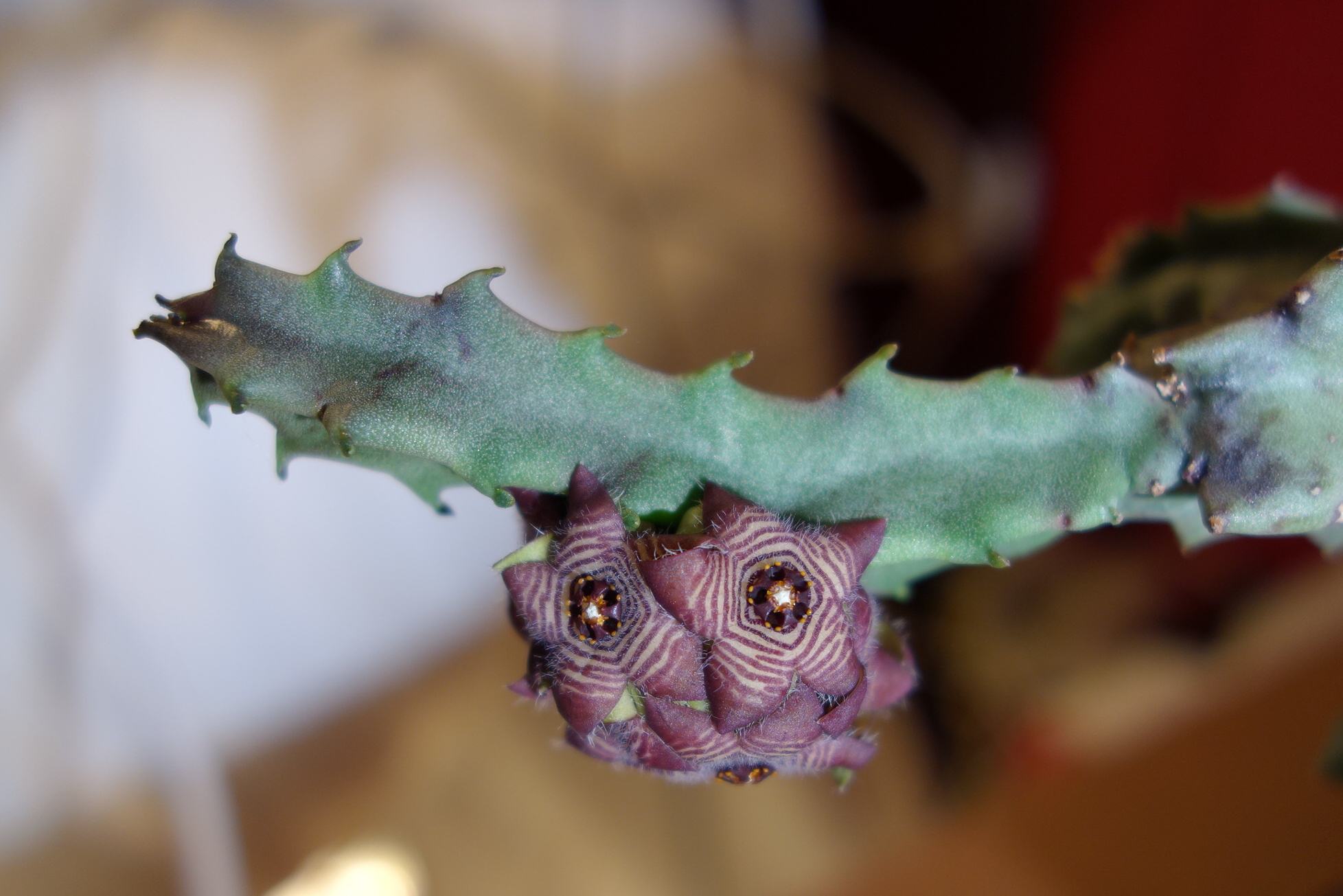
- Apteranthes europaea

Scientific classification
- Kingdom: Plantae
- Clade: Tracheophytes
- Clade: Angiosperms
- Clade: Eudicots
- Clade: Asterids
- Order: Gentianales
- Family: Apocynaceae
- Genus: Apteranthes
- Species: A. europaea

Binomial name
- Apteranthes europaea (Guss.) Murb.

Synonyms
- Stapelia europaea Guss.; Boucerosia europaea (Guss.) G.Nicholson; Desmidorchis europaea (Guss.) Kuntze; Caralluma europaea (Guss.) N.E.Br.

= Apteranthes europaea =

Species of flowering plant

Apteranthes europaea is a succulent subshrub flowering plant that belongs to the genus Apteranthes in the subfamily Asclepiadoideae of the family Apocynaceae. Its basionym is Stapelia europaea. The native range of this species is Almería and Murcia in southeast Spain, the islands of Linosa and Lampedusa in the Mediterranean sea, North Africa from Morocco to Egypt and from the Sinai to west Jordan.

Common names in Spain include: chumberilla, chumberillo de lobo, empeinadora, espinal, penquilla, penquilla del campo. Called dghemsi, dghibsi or Dawa Nafli (= the medicine of Nafli) in Palestine. Called daghmous in Morocco.

== Uses ==
Edible fleshy branches, much sought after by Bedouin and villagers in Palestine and thought to be delicious. Chewed raw. Also regarded as a medicine. A popular medicinal plant in Morocco. Sold in the souk at Aguelmous.

== Taxonomy ==
Giles Munby sent a plant of Apteranthes europaea to Kew Gardens which was the first of that species to flower at Kew. This led to William Jackson Hooker becoming confused and publishing Boucerosia munbyana (now Apteranthes munbyana) as a synonym of Apteranthes gussoniana, the name he had at that time for Apteranthes europaea. Though the flowers are very distinct, the two species are difficult to distinguish when not in flower.

== Accepted Subspecies and Varieties ==
Meve and Heneidak noted that the extreme variability within and between populations of Apteranthes europaea had led to taxonomists often describing new species, subspecies, varieties or forms which were just morphotypes, ecotypes or geographical races of the species.

Apteranthes europaea subsp. europaea Native range: Southeast Spain, Linosa, Lampedusa, North Africa from Morocco to Egypt.

Synonymous species:

- Stapelia italica Ten. ex Salm-Dyck
- Apteranthes gussoneana J.C.Mikan
- Stapelia gussoneana (J.C.Mikan) Jacq. ex Lindl.
- Stapelia lampadosa Jacob-Makoy
- Piaranthus gussoneanus (J.C.Mikan) G.Don
- Boucerosia gussoneana (J.C.Mikan) Hook.f.
- Caralluma simonis A.Berger
- Caralluma affinis De Wild.
- Caralluma confusa Font Quer

Apteranthes europaea subsp. maroccana (Hook.f.) Plowes Native range: Morocco.

Basionym: Boucerosia maroccana Hook.f.

Synonymous species:

- Stapelia quadrangula Schousb.
- Boucerosia maroccana Hook.f.
- Caralluma maroccana (Hook.f.) N.E.Br.

Apteranthes europaea var. judaica (Zohary) Plowes Native range: East of the Suez Canal, from Sinai to west Jordan.

Basionym: Caralluma europaea var. judaica Zohary

Synonymous species:

- Boucerosia aaronis Hart
- Caralluma aaronis (Hart) N.E.Br.
- Caralluma negevensis D.Zohary
- Apteranthes negevensis (D.Zohary) Plowes
