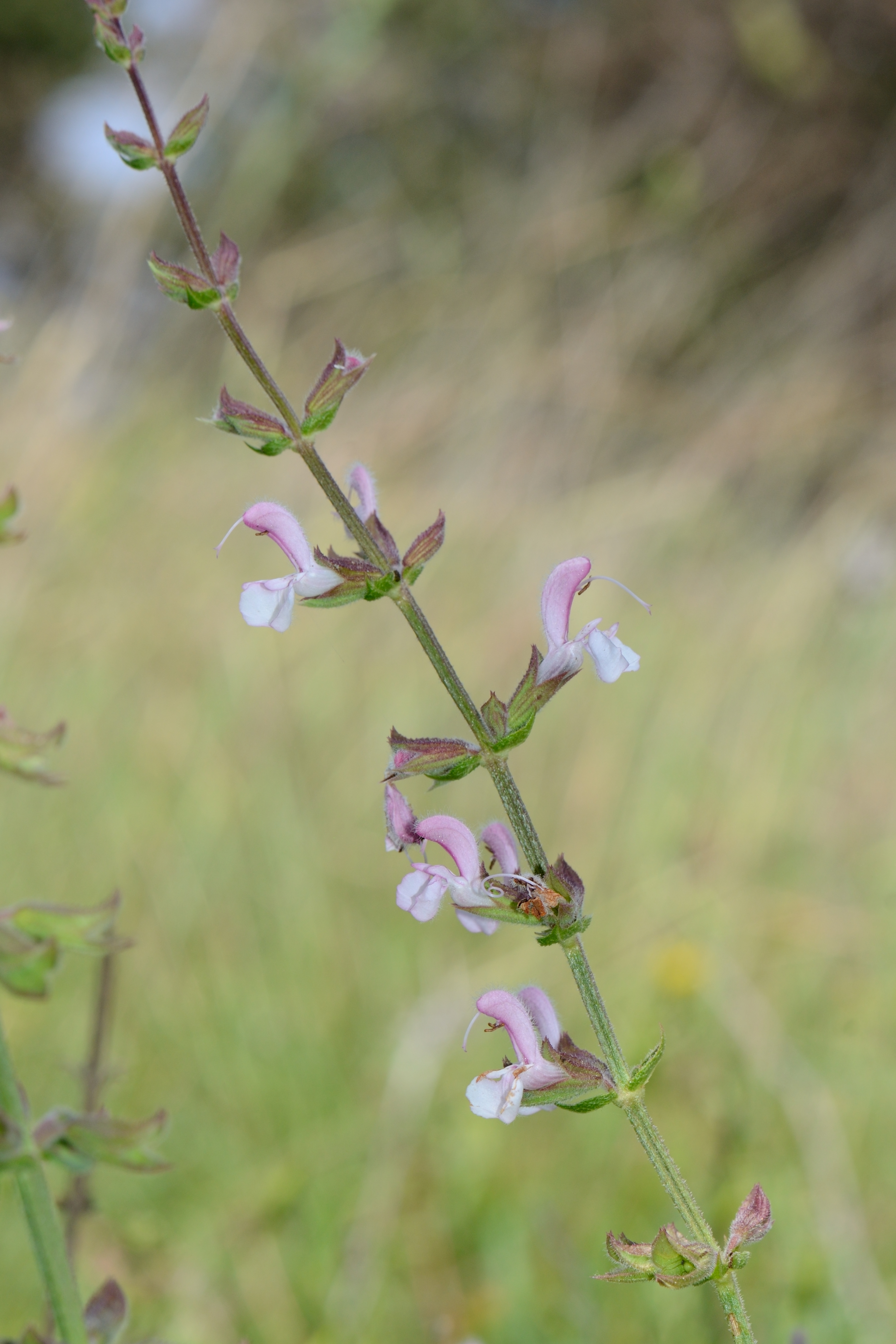

Scientific classification
- Kingdom: Plantae
- Clade: Tracheophytes
- Clade: Angiosperms
- Clade: Eudicots
- Clade: Asterids
- Order: Lamiales
- Family: Lamiaceae
- Genus: Salvia
- Species: S. eigii

Binomial name
- Salvia eigii Zohary

= Salvia eigii =

Species of flowering plant

Salvia eigii is a herbaceous perennial native to Israel. The plant grows in a clump 30 cm high by 60 cm wide, with dark green leaves, the largest of which grow up to 30 cm long and 20 cm wide. The flower stalk grows up to 1 m high, with several 20–30 cm inflorescences which hold flowers growing in whorls. The flower's upper lip is purple, the lower lip is pink, with ruby lines going into the throat. The calyx is a prominent ruby color. Salvia eigii is named after the botanist Alexander Eig.
