= Astragalus zoharyi =

Scientific classification
- Kingdom: Plantae
- Clade: Tracheophytes
- Clade: Angiosperms
- Clade: Eudicots
- Clade: Rosids
- Order: Fabales
- Family: Fabaceae
- Subfamily: Faboideae
- Genus: Astragalus
- Species: A. zoharyi

Binomial name
- Astragalus zoharyi Eig

Synonyms
- Astracantha zoharyi (Eig) Podlech

Species of flowering plant

Astragalus zoharyi is a species of flowering plant in the family Fabaceae. It is a subshrub.

The species is native to the temperate regions of north-eastern Iraq and western Iran.

Astragalus zoharyi was described by Alexander Eig in 1955.
