= Ehud Zohary =

Israeli scientist (born 1958)

- אהוד זהרי
- Born: November 8, 1958 (age 67)
- Education: The Hebrew University of Jerusalem
- Awards: Alon Award (1995), given to the top 20 Israeli tenure track new lecturers in all fields and universities. SPONSOR: Council for Higher Education, Israel. Ben Porat presidential award (1998) for the most prominent young investigator (under 40) in all fields at the Hebrew University of Jerusalem. Golda Meir award (1999) for tenure track fellows. SPONSOR: Golda Meir Foundation. 21st century science initiative award (2004): Bridging Brain, Mind and Behavior SPONSOR: The McDonnel Foundation. Hilgard award for visiting professor (2012-13) at Stanford University.
- Scientific career
- Fields: Visual perception and its development in normal and abnormal conditions.
- Website: https://elsc.huji.ac.il/people-directory/faculty-members/ehud-zohary/

Ehud Zohary (Hebrew: אהוד זהרי; born Nov 8, 1958) is an Israeli scientist, professor of neurobiology at the Edmond and Lilly Safra Center for Brain Science and Alexander Silberman Institute of Life Sciences, the Hebrew University of Jerusalem.

== Biography ==
Ehud Zohary was born and raised in Israel. He did his B.Sc. in biology at the Hebrew University of Jerusalem, and continued studying towards his Ph.D. degree in neurobiology at the Hebrew University under the supervision of Prof. Shaul Hochstein. In 1992, Zohary went to the United States for postdoctoral studies at Stanford University, to join the research group of Bill Newsome, studying the neural correlates of motion perception.

Zohary returned to Israel in 1994, and established a visual neuroscience research group at the department of Neurobiology, the Alexander Silberman Institute of Life Sciences, the Hebrew University of Jerusalem. In 2010 he was invited to join the newly established Edmond and Lilly Safra Center for Brain Science, and is current member of its faculty. He is founder of the Jerusalem Brain Community, and headed it from 2013 to 2020. Zohary was a visiting prof. at Harvard university in 2004-2005 and a Hillgardt visiting Prof. at Stanford university in 2012–2013

Zohary is a faculty-member at the Alexander Silberman life-science institute, Hebrew University, following the footsteps of his grandfather, Michael Zohary, and father, Daniel Zohary. He is married to Rachel Ben Eliyahu, a father of three daughters, and lives in Jerusalem.

== Research ==
Ehud Zohary is studying visual perception and its development in normal and abnormal conditions.

Some of his achievements are summarized below.

=== The sensitivity of single neurons and motion perception ===
Zohary's early research (at Stanford) was focused on understanding the neural basis of motion perception. Using simultaneous recordings from pairs of MT neurons, Zohary found that the firing rates of direction-selective neurons were typically mildly correlated on a trial-by-trial basis. Theoretical considerations showed that this "correlated noise" severely limits the benefits of pooling and may explain why the animal (who is presumably integrating information across wide populations of neurons) is not more sensitive to motion signals than the average neuron. These findings were later reviewed and highlighted.

=== Visual associative memory and sequence memory ===
After establishing his own lab at the Hebrew University Zohary and colleagues studied the neural basis of associative memory. Using single unit recordings, coupled with neural network modelling techniques, they tested and verified key predictions that stem from attractor network theory. As expected from the theory, monkeys naturally categorized visual images according to their ordinal number.

=== Reorganization of the visual cortex following blindness ===
The loss of vision does not render the visual cortex completely useless. Instead, regions in the occipital cortex of people blinded at early age are activated when they read Braille. Yet Braille, being a reading process, involves more than just fine tactile judgments. Indeed, Zohary and colleagues found using fMRI that in the congenitally blind, regions in the occipital lobe are activated during language processes (retrieval of words from memory, in the absence of any sensory input) and their activation level is correlated with memory capabilities. They further showed that blind have superior serial memory performance. Moreover, targeted disruption of the normal activity in the "visual" cortex during verb generation lead to errors in task performance in the congenitally blind but not in the sighted. Thus, long term blindness from birth, dramatically alters the functional architecture of the human brain, in seemingly beneficial ways for the blind person. These initial findings were replicated and extended later and reviewed thoroughly.

The possibilities and limits for visual function recovery after prolonged blindness from birth

Zohary's latest research is focused on the development of vision functions following prolonged visual deprivation since birth. Zohary's Project Eye Opener, is centered around children in Ethiopia that have been blind from birth for years due to untreated cataract. Project eyeopener enables a rare assessment of vision restoration after the "critical period" for visual development. Contrary to this dogma, the utility of surgery at relatively late age for vision restoration is obvious. Still, there are some limits to the capabilities that can be attained.

== Awards and honors ==
- 1995: Alon Scholarship (given to the top 20 Israeli tenure track new lecturers in all fields and universities). SPONSOR: Council for Higher Education, Israel.
- 1998: Ben Porat presidential award, for the most prominent young investigator (under 40) in all fields at the Hebrew University of Jerusalem
- 1999: Golda Meir award for tenure track fellows. SPONSOR: Golda Meir Foundation
- 2004: 21st century science initiative award: Bridging Brain, Mind and Behavior SPONSOR: The McDonnel Foundation
- 2012-13: Hilgard award for visiting professor at Stanford University
