= Allium truncatum =

Scientific classification
- Kingdom: Plantae
- Clade: Tracheophytes
- Clade: Angiosperms
- Clade: Monocots
- Order: Asparagales
- Family: Amaryllidaceae
- Subfamily: Allioideae
- Genus: Allium
- Subgenus: A. subg. Allium
- Species: A. truncatum

Binomial name
- Allium truncatum (Feinbrun) Kollmann & D.Zohary

Synonyms
- Allium ampeloprasum var. truncatum Feinbrun; Allium ampeloprasum subsp. truncatum (Feinbrun) Kollmann

Species of flowering plant

Allium truncatum is a plant species found in Israel, Palestine, Lebanon and Turkey. It is a bulb-forming perennial producing an umbel of many urn-shaped purple flowers.
