= Alexander Silberman Institute of Life Sciences =

Research & teaching institute in the Hebrew University

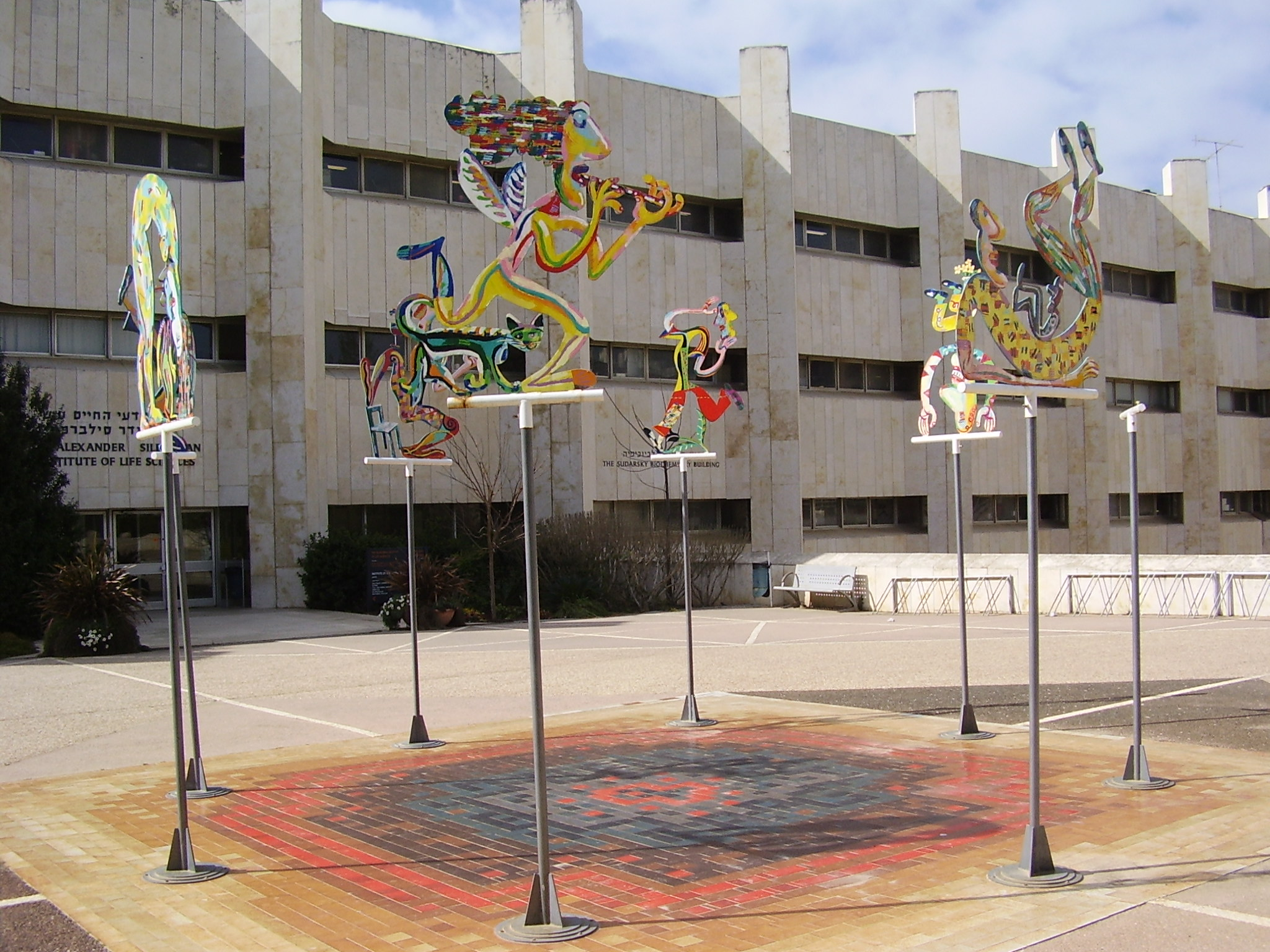
- Type: Research Institute
- Established: 1925
- Parent institution: The Hebrew University of Jerusalem
- Chairperson: Prof. Guy Bloch
- Academic staff: 75
- Students: 900
- Undergraduates: 600
- Location: Jerusalem, Israel
- Language: Hebrew & English
- Website: https://www.bio.huji.ac.il/en

The Alexander Silberman Institute of Life Sciences (AS-ILS) at the Hebrew University of Jerusalem is the oldest life sciences research institute in Israel. It is part of the Faculty of Sciences, and is located in the Edmond J. Safra Campus (Givat Ram) in Jerusalem.

== History ==
The origins of the institute date back to 1925, the year that the Hebrew University was founded, when the Department of Botany was formed as part of a research unit called "The Institute for Studying the Natural History of the Land of Israel". Among the founding researchers were Profs. Otto Warburg, Alexander Eig, Michael Zohary and Naomi Feinbrun-Dothan. During the first years of the department, several large-scale projects that continue to this day have been started off, including the establishment of the Herbarium Collection, today part of Israel's Natural History Collections, and the establishment of the National Botanic Garden of Israel at Mount Scopus, which was the first of its kind in the Middle East.

In 1928, Prof. Simon Bodenheimer joined the nascent institute and established the Department of Zoology, leading the institute to probe into new scientific fields.

Research activities at both departments (and at the Hebrew University in general) were diminished in 1948 during the War of Independence, and were brought to a complete stop following the Hadassah medical convoy massacre. Activity in both departments was renewed after the war, in April 1949.

== Notable achievements ==
Throughout the years AS-ILS members have conducted basic research as well as applied science in the fields of biomedicine, biotechnology and agriculture at multiple levels of organization, from molecular mechanism in cells, through processes within the whole organism, and to studies at the population level. AS-ILS members have been associated with several discoveries:

- The first description of the flora of Palestine.
- Studies of various genetic traits amongst different Jewish ethnic groups in Israel. These studies served as the basis of genetic counseling in Israel.
- Description of 2,470 plant species found in Israel and surrounding areas, which serve as the meeting point of four phytogeographical regions, first published in 1966.
- Allosteric control of enzymes and cooperativity and the mathematical equations that describe these phenomena.
- Discovery that cholera toxin activates adenylyl cyclase by inhibiting the catecholamine-stimulated GTPase.
- Revealing the stabilizing role of poly(A) tail on mRNA.
- Signal transduction mechanisms - beta-adrenergic receptors and their mode of coupling to adenylate cyclase.
- Demonstrating that the β-adrenergic receptor acts as a guanine nucleotide exchange factor facilitating GDP/GTP exchange to activate adenylyl cyclase.
- Plant domestication in the Middle East, especially crops such as cereals, pulses and fruit trees (first published in 1987).
- Understanding how microbes adapt to changing environments.
- Developing pharmacological inhibitors of tyrosine kinases that can serve as anti-cancer drugs.
- Identification and isolation of the major positive regulator of meiosis.
- Identification and characterization of the gene mutated in cystic fibrosis disease and uncovering genetic mechanisms contributing to the disease severity.
- Mapping of meiotic DNA double-strand breaks on whole yeast chromosomes.
- First report of the impact of stress on gene expression.
- Genetic manipulation and disease modeling using human pluripotent stem cells.
- Immunogenicity and the basis of tumorigenicity of human embryonic stem cells.
- Studying how microbes develop resistance mechanisms against antibiotics.
- Discovery that cancer development is promoted by uncoordinated regulation of nucleotide biosynthesis and cell proliferation.
- First demonstration of spontaneous and direct differentiation of human embryonic stem cells.
- First DNA methylation maps of Neanderthals and Denisovans.
- First generation of haploid human embryonic stem cells.
- Genome-wide screenings in human development and disease.
- Anatomical profile of a Denisovan.
- Re-discovery of transfer RNA fragments' functions.

== Study Programs ==
The institute offers a number of undergraduate programs, including a single major program, joint dual major programs, supplementary units, and a number of excellence programs.
