= Clara Heyn =

Romanian-born Israeli botanist (1924–1998)

Chaya Clara Heyn
- חיה קלרה חן
- Born: 13 June 1924; Cluj, Romania
- Died: 27 December 1998 (aged 74); Rosario, Argentina
- Education: Hebrew University of Jerusalem
- Known for: Taxonomy
- Awards: OPTIMA gold medal (1995)
- Scientific career
- Fields: Botany
- Workplaces: Hebrew University of Jerusalem
- Doctoral advisor: Naomi Feinbrun, Michael Zohary
- Author abbrev. (botany): Heyn

Chaya Clara Heyn (Hebrew: חיה קלרה חן; June 13, 1924 – December 27, 1998) was an Israeli botanist and professor at the Alexander Silberman Institute of Life Sciences, the Hebrew University of Jerusalem, also working in the university's herbarium. She has cataloged and identified many plants, and three taxa are named in her honor.

== Biography and education ==
Clara Blau was born in 1924 in Cluj, Transylvania, Romania. Her father, Paul-Pinchas (1889–1948), was a journalist and a businessman and had a doctorate in international relations. Her mother, Sima (née Grünfeld, 1895–1990) was a housewife. Her brother is Joshua Blau.

In 1931, the family emigrated to Baden, Austria, staying there until 1937, when they moved to Vienna. After the Anschluss the family used their Romanian passports to leave Austria on June 8, 1938, and moved to Italy, while waiting to receive immigration certificates to emigrate to Mandatory Palestine. After one month in Trieste the documents arrived, and they moved to Tel Aviv.

Clara studied at the teachers seminary and worked for seven years as an elementary school teacher. In 1945 she started studying biology at the Hebrew University in Jerusalem, after being inspired by hearing a lecture on the topic from Yeshayahu Leibowitz. In 1946 she married Zalman Heyn, who was a poet and a songwriter, as well as the first spokesman and head of public relations at the Ministry of Labor. They had two children.

During the War of Independence, she had to stop her studies and participated in the Haganah activities and later served also in the Israel Defence Forces. After the war, she competed her M.Sc. in botany (cytotaxonomy) in 1954 under the supervision of Naomi Feinbrun. During her studies, Heyn also taught at the Hebrew University Secondary School from 1950 to 1953. Heyn continued to study for a doctorate, which she completed in 1960. Her dissertation was on the “Monographic revision of annual species of Medicago L. in the sections Spirocarpos Ser. and Orbiculares Urb.” under the supervision of Naomi Feinburn and Michael Zohary. She then published a book based on that dissertation.

== Scientific career ==
Her research focused on the family Leguminosae, and especially the genus Medicago. In addition to Medicago, some of the genera she studied in depth were Trigonella, Lotus, Onobrychys, Lupinus, Prangos, Heptaptera and Calendula. In 1962, she became part of the department of botany in the Hebrew University In Jerusalem and in 1978 finally received the rank of a full professor. Between 1969 and 1997 she managed the university's Herbarium. and was instrumental in computerization of the herbarium's collections, starting from 1980.

From 1993 to 1998 Heyn was the head of the committee of Naming Israeli flora of the Academy of the Hebrew Language, dedicated to determining Hebrew names to many of the local flora.

Heyn was one of the founders of the Organisation for the Taxonomic Investigation of the Mediterranean Area (OPTIMA) in 1974, and served on its board and executive council until 1993. She received the OPTIMA gold medal in 1995. Heyn's research included the systematics and evolution of plants, moving into pollination biology by the 1980s. Later in life, she studied the mosses of Israel, in collaboration with Dr. Ilana Herrnstadt. Her last book Bryophyte Flora of Israel was published posthumously in 2004 (with Ilana Herrnstadt, Hélène Bischler and Suzanne Jovet-Ast).

Heyn died from cancer on December 27, 1998.

Three taxa are named after her: Medicago sect. Heynianae Greuter; Medicago heynianae Greuter; and Prangus subg. Heynia Pimenov & V. H. Tikhom.

== Books ==
- Chaia Clara Heyn, The annual species of Medicago, Magnes Press, 1963
- M. Zohary, C.C. Heyn, D. Heller, Conspectus florae orientalis : an annotated catalogue of the flora of the Middle East, Israel Academy of Sciences and Humanities, 1980-1994
- C. Clara Heyn and Ilana Herrnstadt, editors, The Bryophyte flora of Israel and adjacent regions, Israel Academy of Sciences and Humanities, 2004
- Heyn also wrote botany articles of the Encyclopaedia Hebraica.
