= Allium dumetorum =

Conservation status
- Least Concern (IUCN 3.1)

Scientific classification
- Kingdom: Plantae
- Clade: Tracheophytes
- Clade: Angiosperms
- Clade: Monocots
- Order: Asparagales
- Family: Amaryllidaceae
- Subfamily: Allioideae
- Genus: Allium
- Subgenus: Allium subg. Melanocrommyum
- Species: A. dumetorum

Binomial name
- Allium dumetorum Feinbrun & Szel.

Species of flowering plant

Allium dumetorum is a Middle Eastern species of onion found in Israel, Palestine, Lebanon and Jordan. It is a bulb-forming perennial with a few pinkish flowers; ovary pale green.

== Bibliography ==
- Fragman-Sapir, Ori; Fritsch, Reinhard M. (2011). "New species of Allium sect. Melanocrommyum from the eastern Mediterranean" (PDF). Herbertia. 65: 31–50. Archived from the original (PDF) on 2016-09-23.
