= Murbeckiella sousae =

Conservation status
- Near Threatened (IUCN 3.1)

- Near Threatened (IUCN 3.1)

Scientific classification
- Kingdom: Plantae
- Clade: Tracheophytes
- Clade: Angiosperms
- Clade: Eudicots
- Clade: Rosids
- Order: Brassicales
- Family: Brassicaceae
- Genus: Murbeckiella
- Species: M. sousae

Binomial name
- Murbeckiella sousae Rothm.

Species of plant

Murbeckiella sousae is a species of flowering plant in the mustard family Brassicaceae, endemic to the central and northern mountains of continental Portugal. It inhabits cracks in rocks, escarpments, embankments of paths. On siliceous substrates, mainly schists, in mountain areas.
