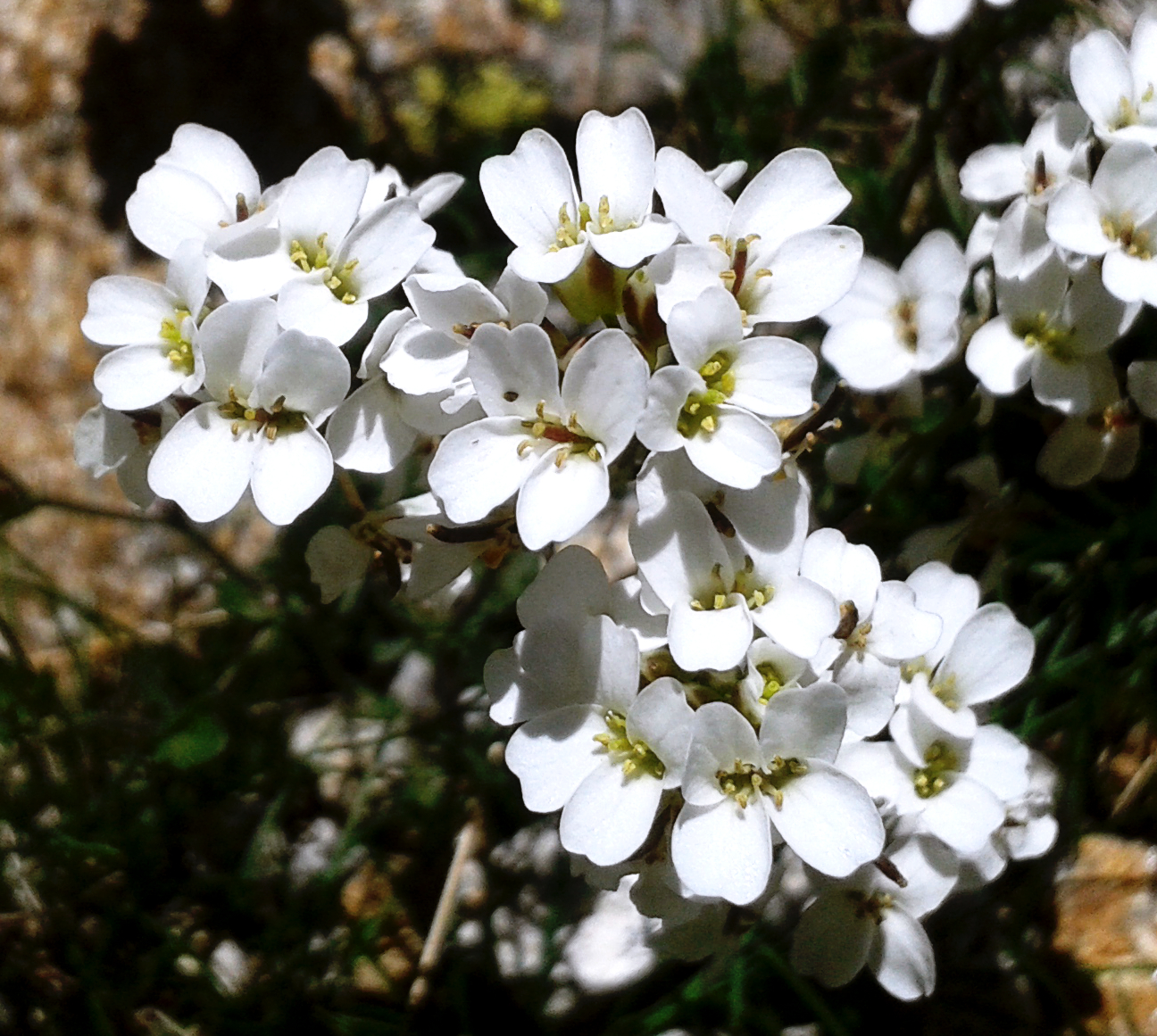
- Murbeckiella boryi

Scientific classification
- Kingdom: Plantae
- Clade: Tracheophytes
- Clade: Angiosperms
- Clade: Eudicots
- Clade: Rosids
- Order: Brassicales
- Family: Brassicaceae
- Tribe: Oreophytoneae
- Genus: Murbeckiella; Rothm.

Species
- See text

= Murbeckiella =

Genus of flowering plants

Murbeckiella is a genus of six species of flowering plants in the mustard family Brassicaceae. The species of the genus are native to mountainous areas in Southern Europe, the Caucasus, and Northwest Africa.

They are native to France, Italy, Morocco, Portugal, Spain, Switzerland, the Caucasus, and Turkey.

The genus name of Murbeckiella is in honour of Svante Samuel Murbeck (1859–1946), a Swedish professor, botanist, pteridologist and explorer. It was first described and published in Bot. Not. 1939 on page 468 in 1939.

== Species ==
Six species are accepted.

- Murbeckiella boryi (Boiss.) Rothm.: Iberian Peninsula (Portugal and Spain) and Morocco
- Murbeckiella huetii (Boiss.) Rothm.: Eastern Turkey and Caucasus
- Murbeckiella omissa B.P.R.Chéron – south-central France
- Murbeckiella pinnatifida (Lam.) Rothm.: Pyrenees and the western and central Alps
- Murbeckiella sousae Rothm.: Portugal
- Murbeckiella zanonii (Ball) Rothm.: south and central France and Italy (Apennine Mountains)
