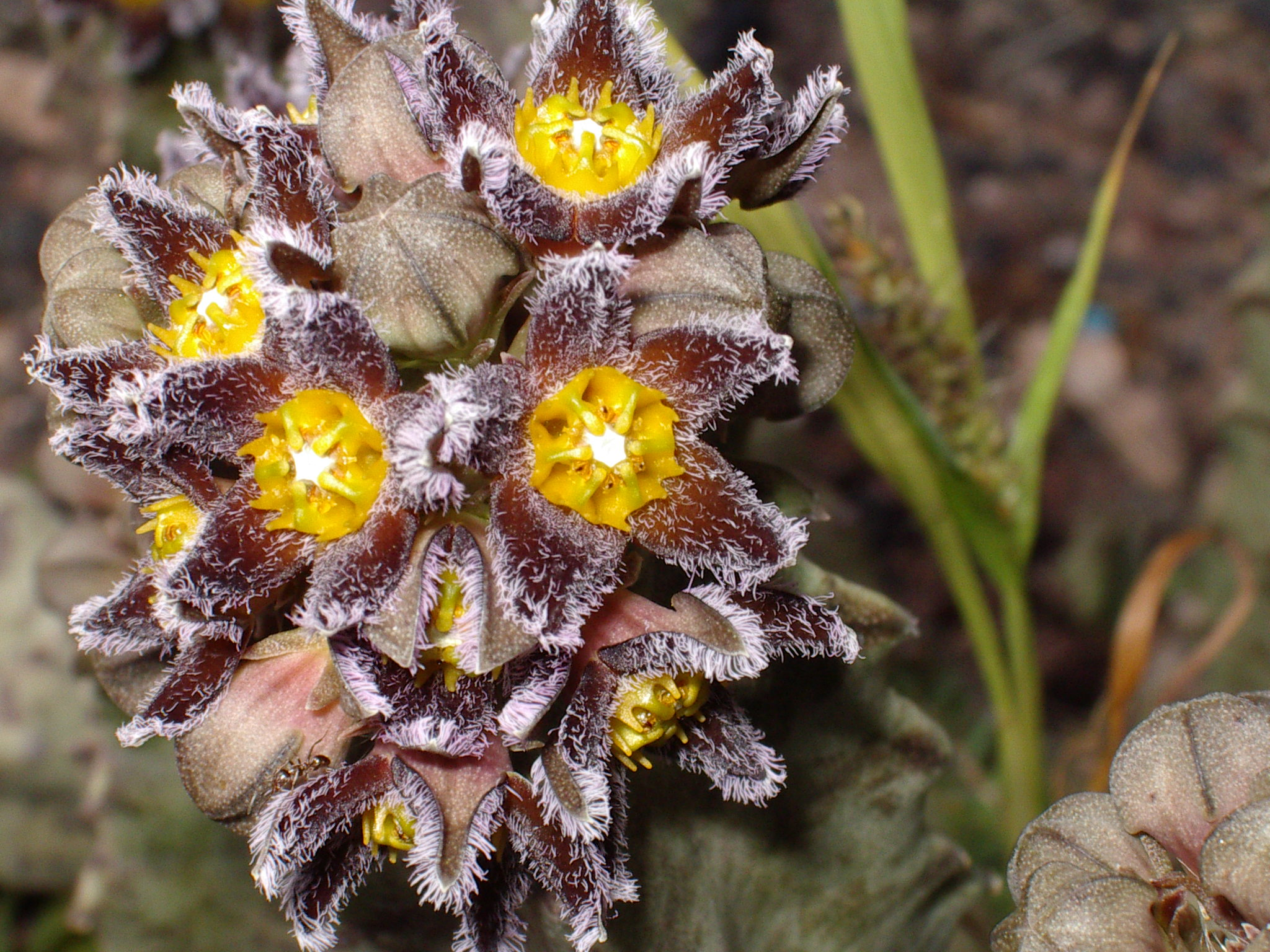

Conservation status
- Endangered (IUCN 3.1) (Europe regional assessment)

Scientific classification
- Kingdom: Plantae
- Clade: Tracheophytes
- Clade: Angiosperms
- Clade: Eudicots
- Clade: Asterids
- Order: Gentianales
- Family: Apocynaceae
- Genus: Apteranthes
- Species: A. burchardii

Binomial name
- Apteranthes burchardii (N.E.Br.) Plowes

Synonyms
- Caralluma burchardii

= Apteranthes burchardii =

Species of plant

Apteranthes burchardii is a fleshy and superficially cactus-like plant that belongs to the genus Apteranthes in the subfamily Asclepiadoideae of the family Apocynaceae. Its basionym is Caralluma burchardii. This species is native to the Canary Islands archipelago and adjacent Morocco.

On the Canary Islands it is found on the islands of Fuerteventura, Lanzarote and Tenerife - specifically, the Tindaya mountains, and La Oliva with more on the Los Lobos Island and on Graciosa.

This stem succulent has flowers which are coloured green to yellow, densely covered with white hairs in the middle, and violet to maroon in a shape of the star.

There are two subspecies:

- Apteranthes burchardii subsp. burchardii. Canary Islands.
- Apteranthes burchardii subsp. maura. Morocco.

== Uses ==
Young shoots eaten by Berbers in Morocco.
