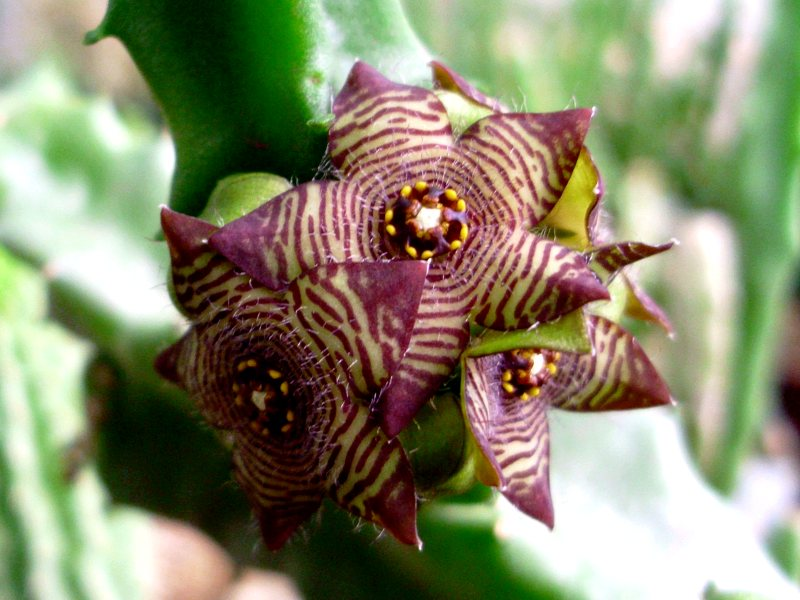
- Apteranthes europaea

Scientific classification
- Kingdom: Plantae
- Clade: Tracheophytes
- Clade: Angiosperms
- Clade: Eudicots
- Clade: Asterids
- Order: Gentianales
- Family: Apocynaceae
- Tribe: Ceropegieae
- Genus: Apteranthes; J.C.Mikan

= Apteranthes =

Genus of flowering plants

Apteranthes is a genus of flowering plants belonging to the family Apocynaceae.

Its native range is Canary Islands, Mediterranean to Indian subcontinent.

Species:

- Apteranthes burchardii (N.E.Br.) Plowes
- Apteranthes europaea (Guss.) Murb.
- Apteranthes faucicola (Bruyns) Plowes
- Apteranthes joannis (Maire) Plowes
- Apteranthes munbyana (Decne.) Meve & Liede
- Apteranthes staintonii (H.Hara) Meve & Liede
- Apteranthes tuberculata (N.E.Br.) Meve & Liede
