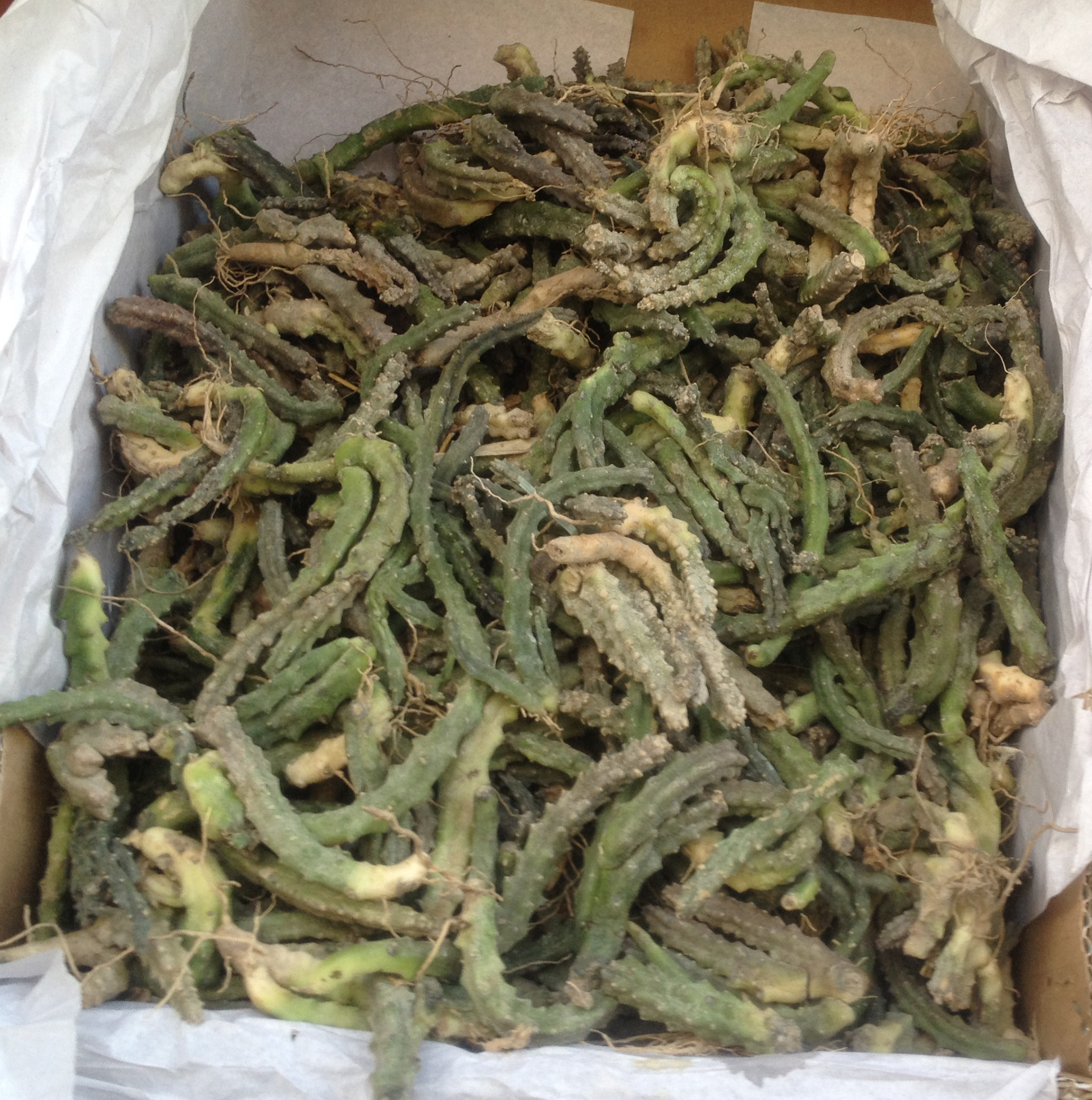
- Chung sold as a vegetable in Paris

Scientific classification
- Kingdom: Plantae
- Clade: Embryophytes
- Clade: Tracheophytes
- Clade: Spermatophytes
- Clade: Angiosperms
- Clade: Eudicots
- Clade: Asterids
- Order: Gentianales
- Family: Apocynaceae
- Genus: Apteranthes
- Species: A. tuberculata

Binomial name
- Apteranthes tuberculata (N.E.Br.) Plowes

Synonyms
- Caralluma tuberculata N.E.Br. Borealluma tuberculata (N.E.Br.) Plowes

= Apteranthes tuberculata =

Species of plant

Apteranthes tuberculata is a succulent subshrub flowering plant that belongs to the genus Apteranthes in the subfamily Asclepiadoideae of the family Apocynaceae. Its basionym is Caralluma tuberculata. This species is native to Afghanistan, India, Iran, Pakistan, Palestine, Saudi Arabia and the West Himalaya and is found in desert and dry shrubland.

Common names in Pakistan include chungee, chunga and pawuni.

== Uses ==
In 1851, the Scottish army doctor and botanist Andrew Fleming reported that this plant was "A favourite food of the natives, both raw & boiled" in the Salt Range.

In 1892, the English soldier and botanist Henry Collett remarked "This is sold in the bazaars of Peshawar—and eaten fried in ghee—the juice of the plant [which is very bitter... ...] having first been expressed."

In 1988, a paper reporting on new chemicals found in the species reported that it is "... a succulent perennial herb occurring wild and also cultivated throughout Pakistan... ...This plant is eaten raw or cooked as a vegetable and is also reputed to be a cure for diabetes and rheumatism."
