= Eigia =

Scientific classification
- Kingdom: Plantae
- Clade: Tracheophytes
- Clade: Angiosperms
- Clade: Eudicots
- Clade: Rosids
- Order: Brassicales
- Family: Brassicaceae
- Genus: Eigia; Soják

Synonyms
- Macrostigmatella longistyla (Eig) Rauschert; Stigmatella longistyla Eig

Genus of plants

Eigia is a monotypic genus of flowering plants belonging to the family Brassicaceae. It only contains 1 species, Eigia longistyla (Eig) Soják .

Its native range is eastern Mediterranean, and is found in the countries of Palestine and Saudi Arabia.

Its genus name of Eigia is in honour of Alexander Eig (1894–1938) an Israeli botanist, and the epithet of longistyla is a combination of 'long' and the Greek word of stylos meaning a pillar.

Eigia longistyla (Eig) Soják was first published and described in Cas. Nár. Mus., Odd. Prír Vol.148 on page 193 (in 1979 but published in 1980).
