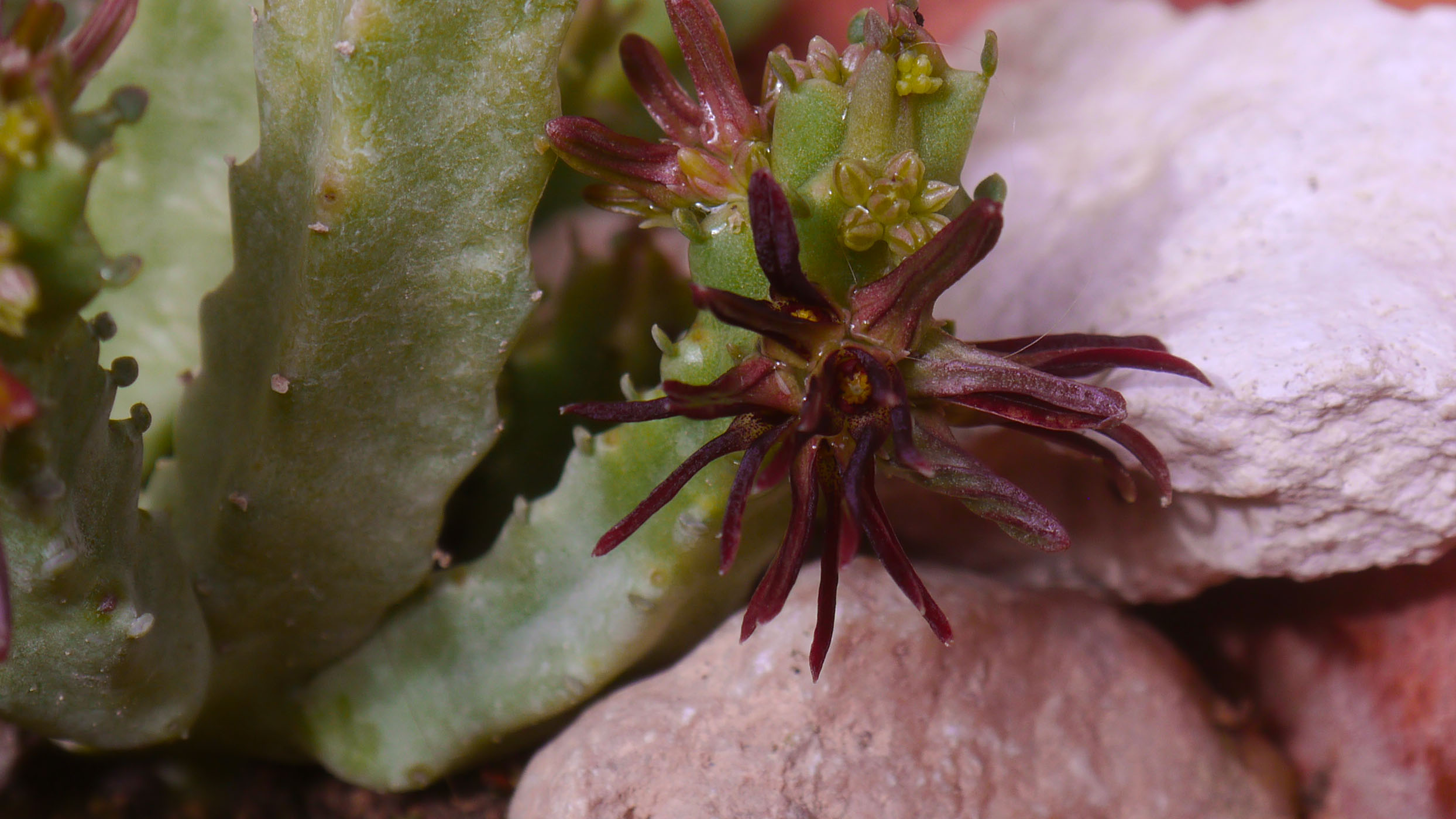
- Apteranthes munbyana

Scientific classification
- Kingdom: Plantae
- Clade: Tracheophytes
- Clade: Angiosperms
- Clade: Eudicots
- Clade: Asterids
- Order: Gentianales
- Family: Apocynaceae
- Genus: Apteranthes
- Species: A. munbyana

Binomial name
- Apteranthes munbyana (Decne.) Meve & Liede

Synonyms
- Boucerosia munbyana Decne.; Caralluma munbyana (Decne.) N.E.Br.; Boucerosia hispanica Coincy; Borealluma munbyana (Decne.) Plowes

= Apteranthes munbyana =

Species of flowering plant

Apteranthes munbyana is a succulent subshrub flowering plant that belongs to the genus Apteranthes in the subfamily Asclepiadoideae of the family Apocynaceae. The native range of this species is Algeria, Morocco and southeast Spain (Albacete, Alicante, Murcia and Valencia).

== Uses ==
In 1847, Giles Munby was the first to publish the species, as Boucerosia munbyana, having found the plants growing abundantly on rocks overlooking the sea on the coast between Mers El Kébir and Cape Falcon, just west of Oran in Algeria. Munby noted that the young shoots were eaten by Arabs.

== Taxonomy ==
Munby has the first publication of this plant in his own book, despite it being named after himself. Normally, this would be a breach of botanical etiquette but Joseph Decaisne was reported to have named the plant in an unpublished letter.

Munby sent a plant of Apteranthes europaea to Kew Gardens which was the first of that species to flower at Kew in 1858. This misled William Jackson Hooker into publishing Boucerosia munbyana as a synonym of Apteranthes gussoniana, the name he had at that time for Apteranthes europaea. Though the flowers are very distinct, the two species are difficult to distinguish when not in flower.

Some of the plants sent by Munby to Kew must have been Apteranthes munbyana as a small flowering sample "from a plant recḏ from Mr. Munby cult. by N.E. Brown" was included on a herbarium sheet that was mostly Munby's 1851 herbarium offering of the species.

In the same article, Hooker also suggested that René Louiche Desfontaines had been the first to encounter an Apteranthes, near Kerwan in Tunisia. Desfontaines had published the plant he encountered as Stapelia hirsuta in 1797, despite that plant only being known from South Africa at that time. Desfontaines did not give his own description or illustration of the plant he saw.
