= Daniel Zohary =

Israeli botanist (1926–2016)

Daniel (Dani) Zohary (Hebrew: דניאל זהרי; 24 April 1926 – 16 December 2016) was an Israeli plant geneticist, agronomist, and professor at the Hebrew University. He was the co-author of a comprehensive review of the origin and spread of domesticated plants in southwest Asia, Europe, and North Africa, Domestication of Plants in the Old World.

== Biography ==
Daniel Zohary was born in Jerusalem to Leah and Michael Zohary, who was a professor, writer, and pioneering botanist. Inspired by travels with his father on botanical expeditions, Zohary took an interest in the flora of the region and began to interact with other researchers like Tuviah Kushnir, Daniel Raz and Eviatar Nevo. He was conscripted at 17 and joined the Palmach. Three years later, Zohary went to study at the Hebrew University in Jerusalem. His study was interrupted by war in 1948, during which he was stationed in the Jerusalem Corridor where heavy fighting resulted in the loss of most of his platoon and many of his fellow students, including his close friend Tuviah Kushnir.

In 1952, he moved to the University of California and worked on his PhD under G. Ledyard Stebbins on the cytogenetics of Dactylis glomerata. In 1954 he married his girlfriend Devora, and in 1956, he returned with his family to the Hebrew University where he helped found the department of genetics.

Zohary's wife Devora died in 1976, and he later remarried Lilly (born Monderer). Zohary had three children Tamar, a marine biologist; Ruth, an artist; and Ehud, Professor of Neurobiology at the Alexander Silberman Institute of Life Sciences and the Safra Brain Center, Hebrew University.

The standard author abbreviation D.Zohary is used to indicate this person as the author when citing a botanical name.

== Awards ==
- J. Belling Award in Genetics, University of California, 1959
- Distinguished Economic Botanist, 2003
