= Svante Samuel Murbeck =

Swedish professor, botanist, pteridologist and explorer

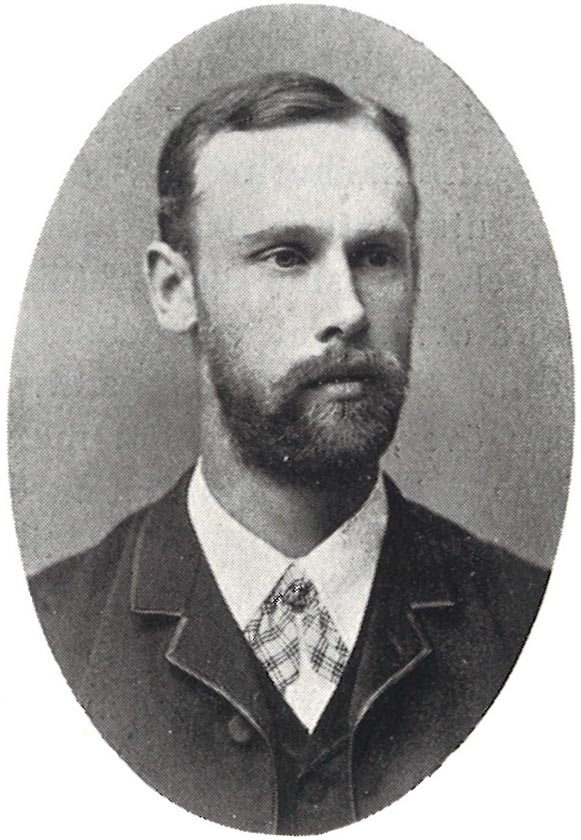
Svante Murbeck

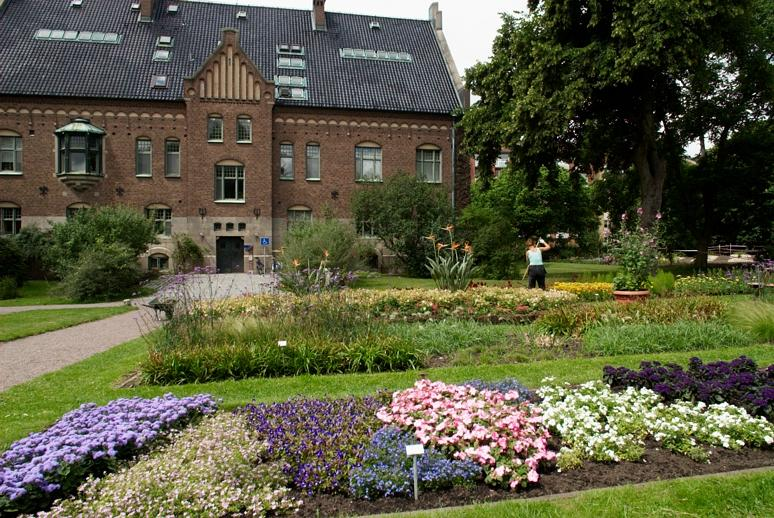
Botaniska trädgården at Lund

Svante Samuel Murbeck (20 October 1859 - 26 May 1946) was a Swedish professor, botanist, pteridologist and explorer.

== Biography ==
Murbeck was born in the parish of Hardeberga in Skåne County, Sweden. While studying at Lund University, Murbeck undertook a successful field trip to Bosnia-Herzegovina before receiving his PhD in geology and botany in 1891. That same year he was made a lecturer at the university. He took up a position as curator of the Swedish Museum of Natural History (1882-1883) and from 1897 until 1902 he worked for the Swedish University of Agricultural Sciences at Alnarp. Murbeck returned to Lund University to become professor of botany and director of the Botaniska trädgården from 1902-24. Murbeck became a member of the Royal Swedish Academy of Sciences in 1907 and the Royal Society of Sciences in Uppsala in 1911. Starting from 1886 he co-edited the exsiccata Violæ Sueciæ exsiccatæ quas adjuvante Carl Areskog ediderunt L. M. Neuman, L. J. Wahlstedt, S. S. Murbeck.

Murbeck also published important studies in morphology, histology and embryology. He made important contributions to knowledge of the flora of North Africa, writing several articles and books, including Contributions a la connaissance de la flore du nord-ouest de I'Afrique et plus specialement de la Tunisie (1897). In 1907, he published the exsiccata Plantae selectae ex Africa boreali.

== Bibliography ==
=== Books ===
- 1891. Kenntniss Beiträge zur Flora von der Südbosnien und der Herzegovina. Ed. Aus Lunds universitets årsskrift, t. 27. 192 pp.
- 1892a. Beiträge zur Kenntniss der Flora von Südbosnien und der Hercegovina. Ed. Berlingska Boktrykkeri. 182 pp.
- 1892b. Tvenne Asplenier, deras affiniteter och genesis. Ed. Berlingska boktrykkeri och stilgjuteriaktiebolage. 45 pp.
- 1897. Contributions à la connaissance des Renonculacées-Cucurbitacées de la flore du nord-ouest de l'Afrique et plus spécialement de la Tunisie. Ed. Impr. de E. Malmström. 126 pp.
- 1898. Contributions à la connaissance des Primulacées-Labiées de la flore du nord-ouest de l'Afrique et plus spécialement de la Tunisie. Ed. Impr. de E. Malmström. 45 pp.
- 1899. Contributions à la connaissance des Plombaginées-Graminées de la flore du nord-ouest de l'Afrique et plus spécialement de la Tunisie. Ed. Impr. de E. Malmström. 32 pp.
- 1900. Contributions à la connaissance des Graminées-Polypodiacées de la flore du nord-ouest de l'Afrique et plus spécialement de la Tunisie. Ed. Impr. d'E. Malmström. 38 pp.
- 1901. Parthenogenetische Embryobildung in der Gattung Alchemilla. Ed. E. Malmströms Buchdruckerei. 46 pp.
- 1905a. Contributions à la connaissance de la flore du nord-ouest de l'Afrique, et plus spécialement de la Tunisie. 2e série. Ed. Impr. de H. Ohlsson. 40 pp.
- 1905b. Contributions à la connaissance de la flore du nord-oues de l'Afrique et plus spécialement de la Tunisie. 2e série suite. Ed. Impr. de H. Ohlsson. 83 pp.
- 1912. Untersuchungen über den Blütenbau der Papaveraceen. Berlín Almqvist och Wiksell. 168 pp. 28 plates & 39 illustrations in the texto
- 1918. Ueber staminale Pseudapetalie und deren Bedeutung für die Frage nach der Herkunft der Blütenkrone. Ed. H. Ohlsson. 59 pp.
- 1923. Contributions à la connaissance de la flore du Maroc. II. Géraniacées, Composées. Ed. C.W.K. Gleerup. 68 pp.
- 1933. Monographie der Gattung Celsia / Weitere Studien uber der Gattungen Verbascum und Celsia. Lund, 1925-1939 2 partes: 236; 70, 630 pp. 16 doube-page plates, 11 figures in the text; 4 plates, 28 maps

=== Other publications ===
- 1892. Studien über Gentianen aus der Gruppe Endotrichae Froel. Ed. Impr. de I. Marcus. 22 pp.
- 1894. Neue oder wenig bekannte Hybriden in dem botanischen Garten Bergielund et Hortus bergianuse, beobachtet von Sv. Murbeck. Ed. Impr. de I. Marcus. 21 pp.
- 1900. Ueber den Bau und die Entwickelung von Dictyosiphon foeniculaceuse Huds. Grev. Ed. J. Dybwad. 28 pp.
- 1901. Ueber das Verhalten des Pollenschlauches bei eAlchemilla arvensise L. Scop. und das Wesen der Chalazogamie. Ed. E. Malmströms Buchdruckerei. 20 pp.
- 1902a. Ber Anomalien im Baue des Nucellus und des Embryosackes bei parthenogenetischen Arten der Gattung Alchemillae. Ed. E. Malmströms Buchdruckerei. 11 pp.
- 1902b. Ber die Embryologie von Ruppia rostellatae Koch. Ed. Kungl. boktryckeriet. 21 pp.
- 1906. Bidrag till Pterantheernas morphologi. Ed. Ohlssons boktryckeri. 20 pp.
- 1907. Die Vesicarius-Gruppe der Gattung et Rumexe, von Sv. Murbeck. Ed. H. Ohlssons Buchdruckerei. 31 pp.
- 1914. Ueber die Baumechanik bei Aenderungen im Zahlenverhältnis der Blüte. Ed. H. Ohlsson. 36 pp.
- 1915. Zur Morphologie und Systematik der Gattung et Alchemillae. Ed. H. Ohlsson. 16 pp.
- 1916. Ueber die Organisation, Biologie und verwandtschaftlichen Beziehungen der Neuradoideen. Ed. H. Ohlsson. 29 pp.
- 1919. Beiträge zur Biologie der Wüstenpflanzen. Ed. O. Harrassowitz
- 1921. Sur quelques espèces nouvelles ou critiques des genres Celsia et Onopordon. Ed. C.W.K. Gleerup. 18 pp.
- 1922. Contributions à la connaissance de la flore du Maroc. I. Ptéridophytes, Légumineuses. Ed. C.W.K. Gleerup.
- 1925. Plantes du Sahara algérien récoltées par Th. Orre, déterminées par Sv. Murbeck. Ed. C.W.K. Gleerup. 9 pp.

== Eponymy ==
In 1939, botanist Werner Hugo Paul Rothmaler published Murbeckiella, a genus of flowering plants in the mustard family Brassicaceae and named in his honour.

The plant taxa Calendula murbeckii, Centaurea murbeckii, Colymbada murbeckii, Mariana murbeckii, Onopordum murbeckii, Bufonia murbeckii, Cerastium murbeckii, Aspidium murbeckii, Gentiana murbeckii and Juncus murbeckii are named after him.

== Botanical authority ==
The abbreviation Murb. is used to indicate Svante Samuel Murbeck as an authority on the description and scientific classification of plants. For a list of the 423 species described by the author, see IPNI.
