= Haya Shalom =

Israeli feminist and human rights activist (born 1944)

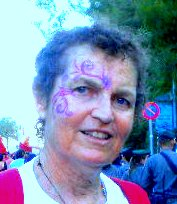
Haya Shalom

Haya Shalom (Hebrew: חיה שלום; born December 4, 1944, in Jerusalem, Israel) is a lesbian feminist and human rights activist. She graduated from Hebrew University in Jerusalem in History Studies. Shalom was nominated among 1000 women for The Nobel Peace Prize. She is of Sephardic extraction.

== Social activism ==
She is active in women anti-war movement Women in Black, she founded a Community for Lesbian Feminist (1987) and co-founded Coalition of Women for Just Peace (1988). Shalom has been involved in movements and projects which focus on prevention of violence against women, solidarity, promotion of peace, non-violent resistance and the role of lesbians in society. Haya Shalom was the initiator and organizer of the Women Poet's Festival (1996). She has been a member of the International board of advisory of the International Gay and Lesbian Human Rights Commission (IGLHRC).

She received the Community Prize of the Gay and Lesbian Community (2000) in recognition of her work and efforts to support the rights of gays and lesbians.

Haya Shalom has been a member of various organizations, e.g. the Women Center for Peace, a Chair of Board of Members of “Kol Haisha”, and a feminist cultural center.

She is involved in the work of the Coalition of Women for Just Peace which consists of Israeli and Palestinian women who make efforts to promote and bring about peace and justice between Israel and Arab and engage women into establishing a just peace and standing up for human rights.

Haya Shalom says "We need to achieve and implement a drastic change that will enable the feminine language to break through and tackle issues concerning solidarity, peace and violence against the rights of women.”
