= Chaja Goldstein =

Polish-born Dutch dancer and singer

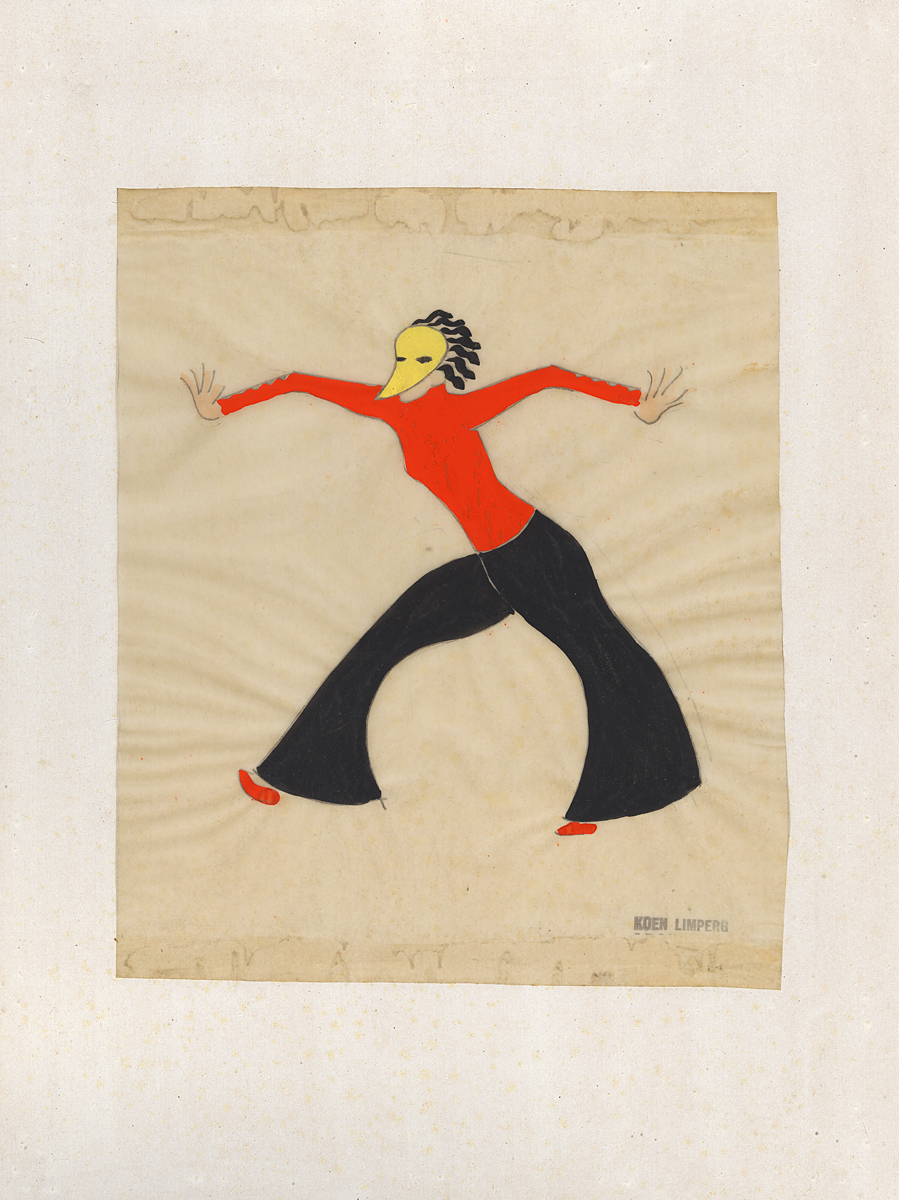
Costume for Chaja Goldstein (by Koen Limberg)

Chaja Ruchel Goldstein (2 July 1908 – 27 January 1999) was a Polish-born Dutch dancer and singer.

The daughter of Jacob Schyja Goldstein and Laja Bromberger, she was born in a ghetto in Rypin. At the age of ten, she moved to Berlin with her family. Goldstein began performing in 1931, dancing and singing Yiddish songs at a Jewish theatre. She lived with the painter György Kepes and had an affair with the Dutch artist Wijnand Grijzen. In 1933, with the rise to power of the Nazis, she moved to Amsterdam. There, she taught dance and gymnastics and also performed in theatres such as the Amsterdam City Theater and the Kurhaus of Scheveningen. Goldstein joined the cabaret performing group Ping Pong. She also performed with Trudi Schoop's ballet company in various locations around the world. Goldstein appeared in an experimental colour film by Paul Schuitema in 1946. In 1948, she moved to New York City with her husband. She was not treated well there and stopped performing in 1951. Her husband became ill and she returned to Amsterdam in 1973; he died five years later. Goldstein emigrated to Israel in 1981.

She married Theodor Johann Heinrich Güsten in 1937.

Goldstein died in Netanya, Israel at the age of 90.
