= Alexander Eig =

Israeli botanist (1894–1938)

- אלכסנדר איג
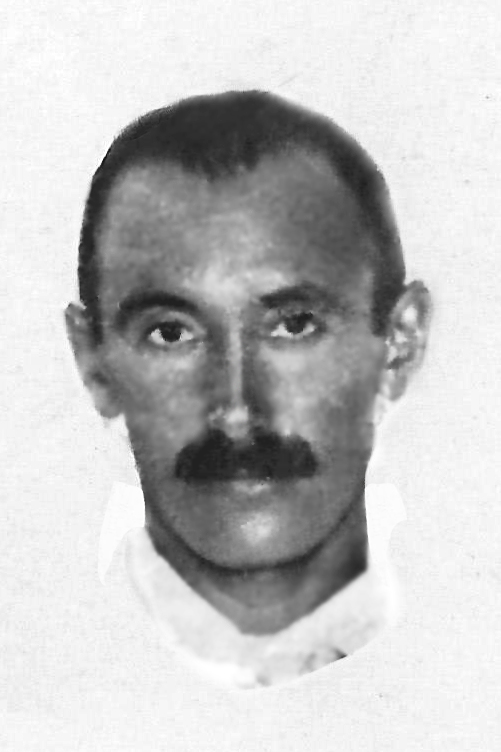
- Born: 1894; Shchadryn, Minsk Governorate, Russian Empire
- Died: 30 July 1938 (aged 43–44); Jerusalem, Mandatory Palestine
- Scientific career
- Fields: Botany
- Institutions: Hebrew University of Jerusalem

Alexander Eig (Hebrew: אלכסנדר איג, Belarusian: Аляксандр Эйг; 1894 – 30 July 1938) was a botanist, one of the first plant researchers in Israel, head of the department of Botany at the Hebrew University in Jerusalem and co-founder of the National Botanic Garden of Israel on Mount Scopus campus.

== Biography ==
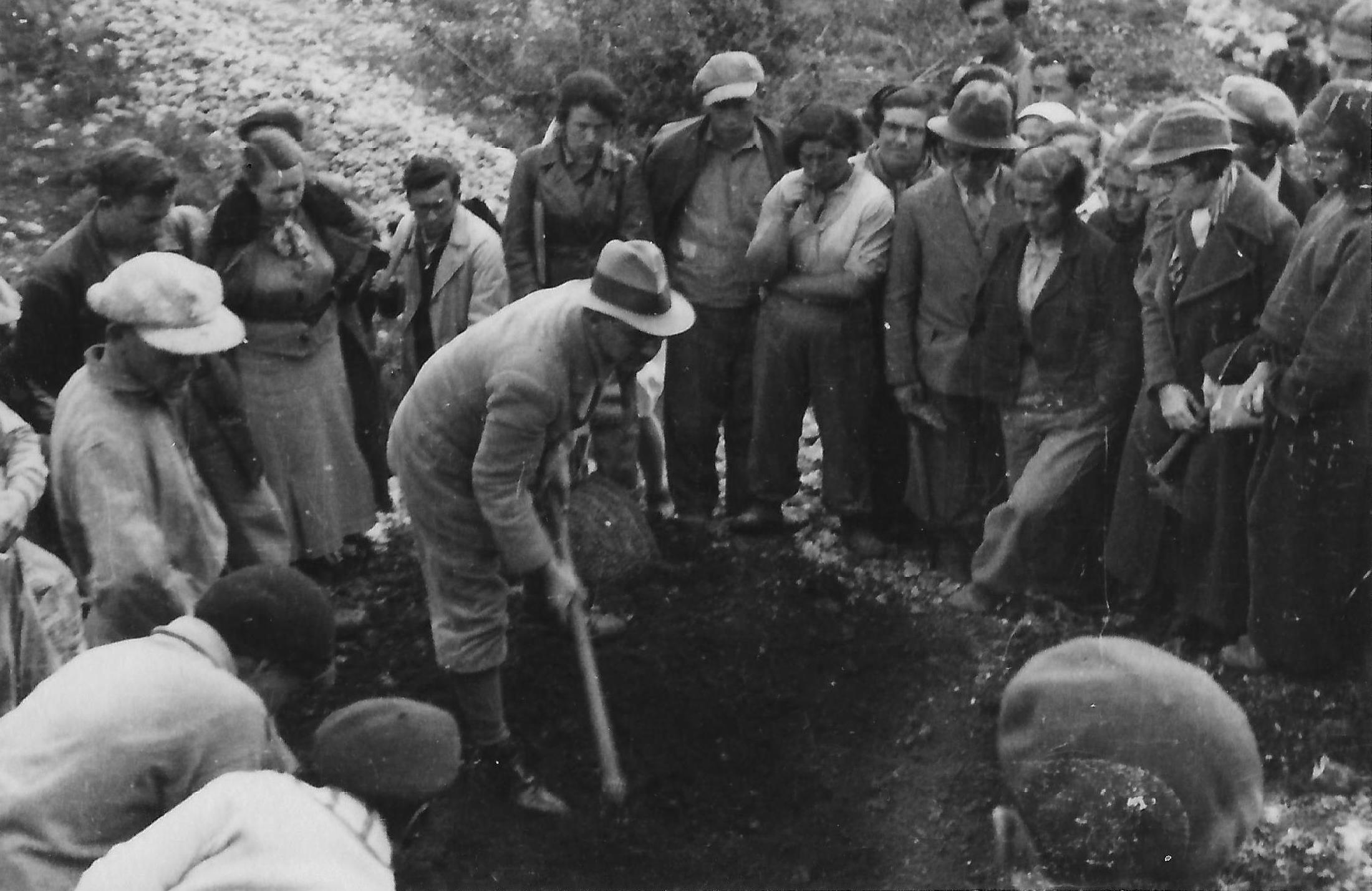
Alexander Eig planting the first tree in the National Botanic Garden of Israel - Mount Scopus 1931

Alexander Eig was born in Shchadryn near Minsk, in present-day Belarus. He used to wander in the forests and join his family on hunting and fishing expeditions observing the plants around. At the age of 15 he immigrated to Palestine, where he became a student at Mikveh Israel agricultural school.

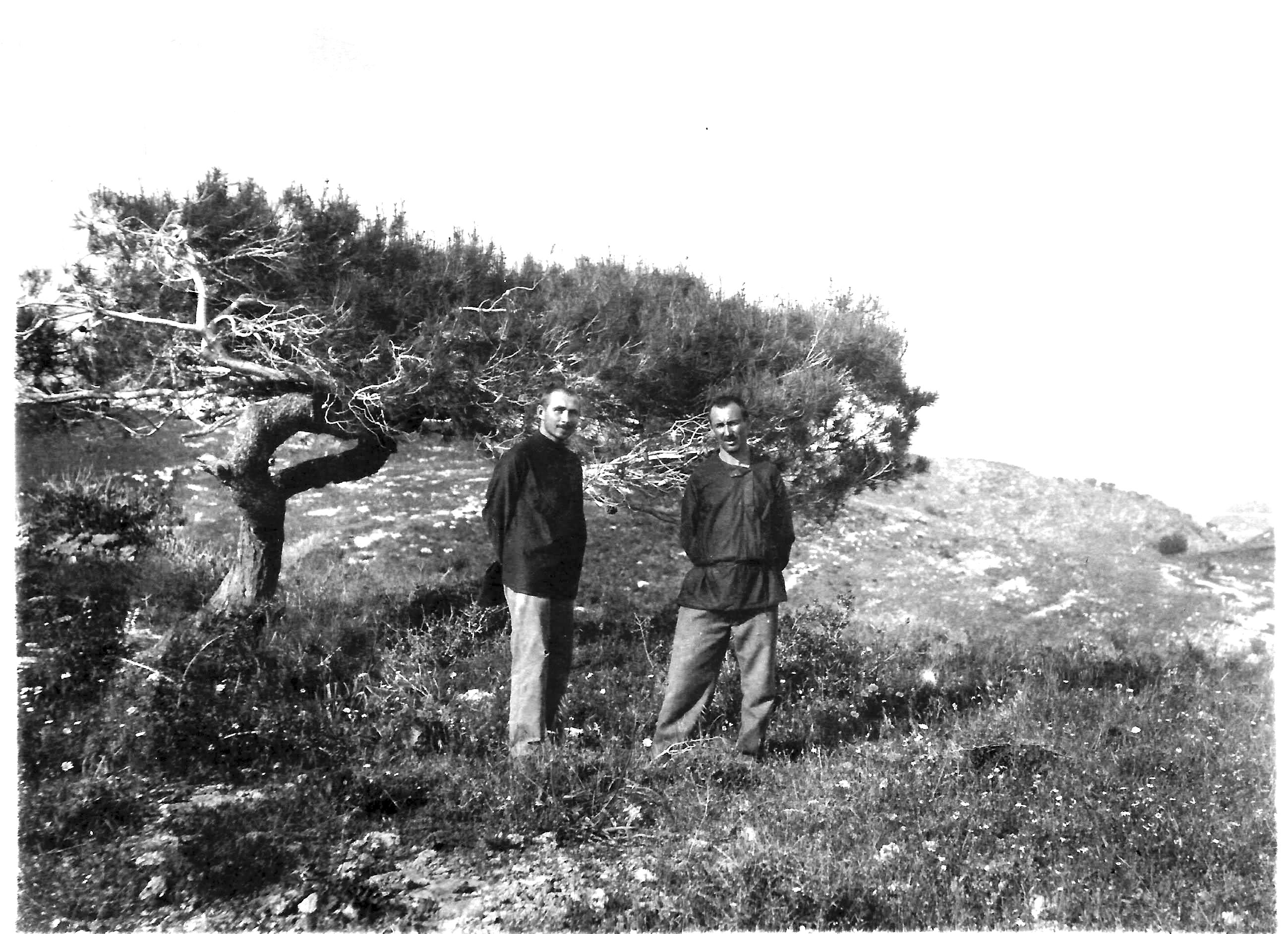
Alexander Eig and Elazar Faktorovsky

In 1925 he was invited by Otto Warburg to join the agricultural experimental station in Tel Aviv, where he worked with Michael Zohary. A year later, the unit moved to Jerusalem, and they joined the staff of the Hebrew University of Jerusalem. That year he married Itta Faktorovsky, the sister of his closest friend and fellow botanist Elazar Faktorovsky.

In 1931 he graduated with his Ph.D., and founded the Botanic Garden on Mount Scopus, together with Zohary and Naomi Feinbrun-Dothan. In 1932 he started teaching botany. Among his students were the brothers Aaron and Ephraim Katzir.

In 1937 he was invited by Yitzhak Ben-Zvi to testify before the Peel Commission, on the question of whether the country could sustain a large population. He was later asked to prepare a map that would serve the arguments of the Zionist side in the international arena.

Eig died of cancer in 1938, at the age of less than 44 years. He was buried in the Mount of Olives Jewish Cemetery. His gravestone bears the inscription "The creator of plant science in Israel." He was eulogized by Moshe Sharett, Hugo Bergmann, Judah Leon Magnes and Yitzhak Ben-Zvi.

== Works ==
- Eig, Alexander (1926). A contribution to the knowledge of the Flora of Palestine. Tel-Aviv. OCLC 917330167.
- Eig, Alexander (1927). A second contribution to the knowledge of the flora of Palestine. Bulletin (Zionist Organisation, Institute of Agriculture and Natural History), 6. Tel-Aviv. OCLC 1004245180.

With Michael Zohary and Naomi Feinbrun-Dothan he organised the distribution of plant specimens from Israel in the exsiccata series. The first series issued in 1930 is entitled Flora exsiccata Palaestinae a sectione botanica Universitatis Hebraicae Hierosolymitanae edita.

== Taxonomic patronyms ==
In honor of Alexander Eig, five taxonomic patronyms were given in plants with names of genus, species and subspecies:

- Eigia longistyla (Eig) Soják
- Bellevalia eigii Feinbrun
- Poa eigii Feinbrun
- Salvia eigii Zohary
- Ornithogalum neurostegium subsp. eigii (Feinbrun) Feinbrun
