= Naomi Feinbrun-Dothan =

Israeli botanist and professor (1900–1995)

Naomi Feinbrun
- נעמי פיינברון
- Born: Naomi Feinbrun; 17 April 1900; Moscow, Russia
- Died: 8 March 1995 (aged 94); Jerusalem
- Education: Moscow University, University of Cluj, Hebrew University of Jerusalem
- Known for: Taxonomy, phytogeography, genetics
- Awards: Gold medal from Optima (1986), Israel Prize (1991)
- Scientific career
- Fields: Botany
- Academic advisors: Alexander Eig
- Author abbrev. (botany): Feinbrun

Naomi Feinbrun-Dothan (Hebrew: נעמי פיינברון-דותן; 17 April 1900 – 8 March 1995) was a Russian-born Israeli botanist, who became part of the academic staff at the Hebrew University of Jerusalem. She studied the flora of Israel and published dozens of articles and several analytical flora books. Just after her 91st birthday, she received the 1991 Israel Prize for her unique contribution to the Land of Israel studies.

She is the botanical author of Allium truncatum, Allium dumetorum, and Iris regis-uzziae.

== Biography ==
Naomi Feinbrun was born in Moscow in 1900. Her parents, Rachel and Aharon Feinbrun, belonged to Hovevei Zion and her father was also a member of the 'Benei Zion' association in Moscow. She had an older sister, Shulamit, and two younger brothers, Miron and Moshe.

The family lived in Kishinev, Bessarabia. She went to an elementary school where she was taught Hebrew and a Jewish girls’ high school in Kishinev. In 1907, the family moved to Moscow. After finishing high school in 1918, she went to Moscow University. In 1920, the family moved back to Bessarabia. She carried on her studies at the University of Cluj, in the Romanian province of Transylvania. In 1923, she received her first degree in botany. She then became a teacher at a Jewish girls high school, teaching natural sciences.

In 1924, the entire Feinbrun family immigrated to Palestine. Since Naomi was 24, she could not use her parents’ familial immigration certificate. Instead a relative helped her by testifying to the authorities that she had been a high-school student at the Herzliya Hebrew Gymnasium in Tel Aviv before leaving for Moscow for a few years. After receiving a recommendation from Rachel Katznelson, Feinbrun started work as a teacher at a school in Tel Adashim in the Jezreel Valley.

In 1925, Feinbrun went on a study tour for natural sciences teachers to the Tavor Mountain. Guiding the tour was Alexander Eig. He encouraged her to do more plant research and became her mentor and colleague.

On the 8 March 1995, Naomi Feinbrun-Dothan died just before her ninety-fifth birthday.

== Scientific career ==
In 1926, she attended the Institute of Agriculture and Natural History in Tel Aviv, (which was directed by Otto Warburg) She then accepted the part-time post of guest researcher. During this time, she studied English mostly using G. E. Posts's book, 'Flora of Syria, Palestine and Sinai' (Beirut 1898).

When the Hebrew University of Jerusalem was founded in April 1925, it was later decided that the Institute of Agriculture and Natural History would be part of the new university. Its name was changed to the 'Systematic Botany Branch', with Otto Warburg still the director.

In 1929, she became an un-tenured assistant at the university, with Alexander Eig and Michael Zohary, they moved to Jerusalem. With Eig and Zohary she started to organise the distribution of plant specimens from Israel in exsiccata series. The first series issued in 1930 is entitled Flora exsiccata Palaestinae a sectione botanica Universitatis Hebraicae Hierosolymitanae edita. In 1931, they produced the first analytical flora book (written in Hebrew). It was later reprinted in English in 1965.

The university had started as a research facility without formal teaching. The teaching of sciences started in the early 1930s. In the Department of Botany, genetics was chosen to be one of the six major subjects on the curriculum. Due to Feinbrun's cytology work with Hannan Oppenheitmer (who was engaged in physiological botany in Rehovot Campus of the university) she began teaching genetics.

From 1930 to 1938, all her botanic publications were in Hebrew or German, and only after 1938 did she start publishing in English.

In 1931, she went to the Kaiser Wilhelm Institute in Berlin in order to increase her knowledge of genetics and there she worked in the 'Department for Hereditary Research'.

In 1931, Alexander Eig founded the Jerusalem Botanical Gardens on Mount Scopus, together with Michael Zohary and Feinbrun.

In 1933, Feinbrun joined a delegation of seven Hebrew University scientists who were invited to Iraq by the Iraqi Ministry of Agriculture. Their main purpose was to conduct a survey of the forests of Kurdistan - preparing an inventory of trees and presenting a proposal for afforestation and for preserving the forests. Other research expeditions in which Feinbrun participated were to Transjordan, the Sinai Peninsula, Lebanon, Cyprus and, in 1944, to the eastern desert in Egypt.

In 1935, she spent two and a half months in the laboratory of Professor Alexandre Guilliermond at the Sorbonne University in Paris. When she returned to Palestine she began teaching genetics and cytology. Until the 1950s she was the only one who taught a course in genetics at the Hebrew University.

In 1936, Eig established the 'Palestine Journal of Botany Jerusalem' In 1951 it was renamed the 'Israel Journal of Botany' and then in 1994 'Israel Journal of Plant Sciences'. In which Feinbrun and her colleagues used to publish their works. The first issue of the journal included a 'phytographic' map based on the three researchers’ many field trips.

During this time, she worked on her doctoral dissertation, A monographic study of the genus Bellevalia, studying the number and form of chromosomes and using them in the systematic classification of this plant genus. Under the supervision of Dr. Eig. It was published in the 'Palestine Journal of Botany'.

In 1938, at the age of 44, Dr. Alexander Eig died. After his death, his two assistants, Michael Zohary and Naomi Feinbrun, continued his work of documenting the flora of Palestine and cultivating the Mount Scopus Botanical Garden.

Also in 1938, she received her Ph.D. degree, but was promoted from instructor to lecturer eventually in 1952. She devoted her full attention to the study of local and Middle Eastern species, mostly grown in her experimental plots and investigated cytotaxonomically (a branch of taxonomy in which chromosome characteristics are used to classify organisms).

In 1948 she wrote an article describing the many botanical contributions of a young botanist, Tuvia Kushnir who fell in the Lamed He convoy.

After 1947, when the state of Israel was established, she and her brothers 'Hebraized' their family name, and she became Naomi Feinbrun-Dothan.

In 1953, Feinbrun spent a sabbatical year at the herbarium at Kew Gardens in London and also the herbaria of Edinburgh and Geneva. In 1960, she became an associate professor of the university. She joined Elisabeth Oldschmidt, Tscharna Rayss and Hanna Rozin (in various fields of biology and medicine), who were the only three women of that rank in the university.

In 1960, she wrote 'Wild plants in the land of Israel'.

Between 1966 and 1986 she co-authored with Prof. Michael Zohary the four volumes of Flora Palaestina. These books include analytical keys, botanical descriptions, and full page illustrations of the native and naturalized plant species of the region.

In the 1970s, several bulbs of an unknown Colchicum were given to her to study. She identified it as a Greek species called Colchicum bowlesianum. Later the bulbs were re-investigated by Karin Persson and were then classed as a separate species. She described the bulbs as a new species in the 'Israeli Journal of Plant Science'. She named it Colchicum feinbruniae after Prof. Feinbrun.

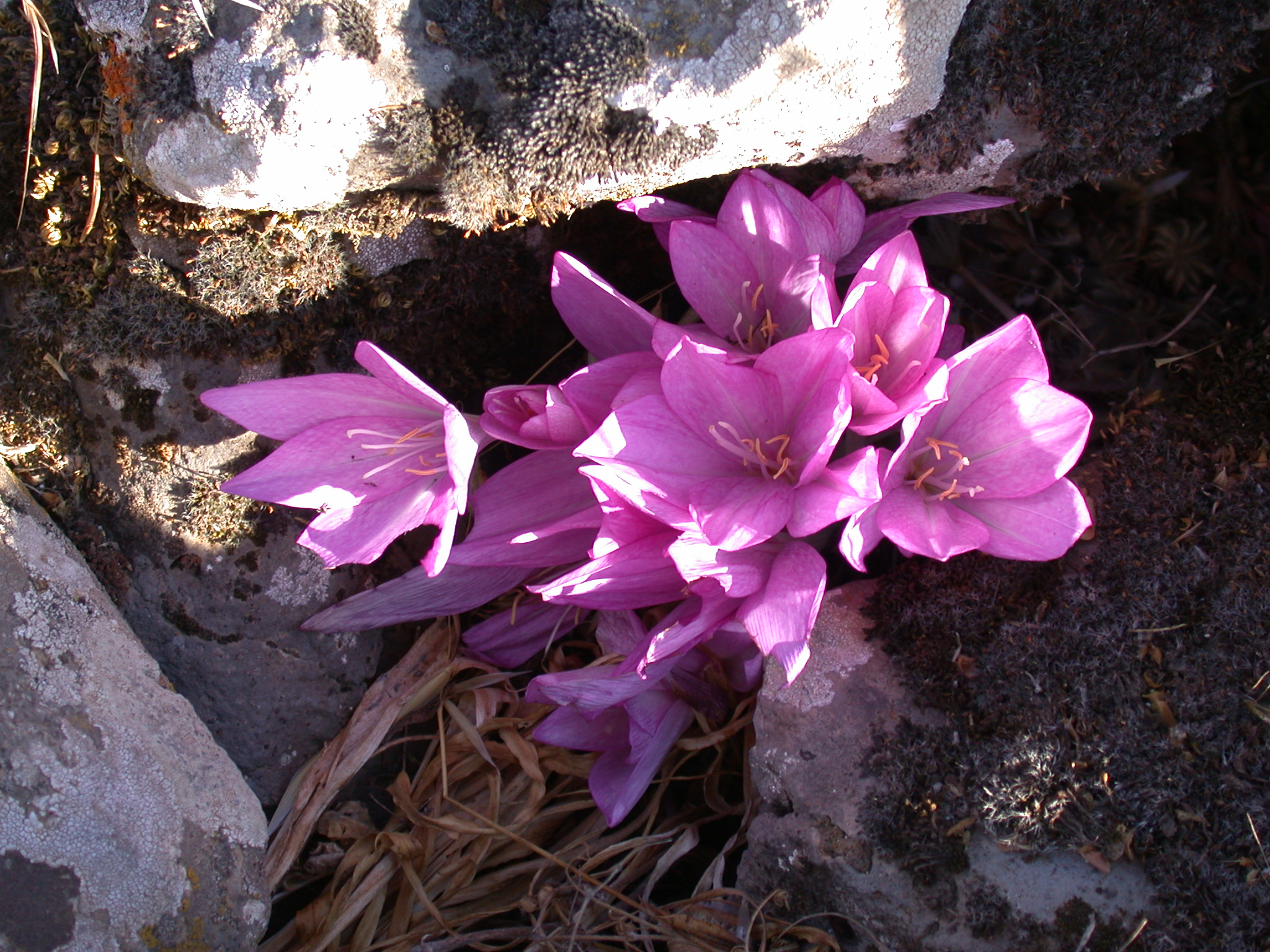
Colchicum feinbruniae on Golan Heights, Israel/Syria, named after Naomi Feinbrun-Dothan

In 1991, she wrote with Avinoam Danin, a new and updated analytical flora book.

== Awards and recognition ==
In 1986, she was awarded a gold medal from 'Optima' (Organization for the Phyto-Taxonomic Investigation of the Mediterranean area), the International Organization of Mediterranean botanists in recognition of the completion of this landmark publication.

In recognition of her botanical achievements, she was awarded the Israel Prize (Land of Israel Studies) in 1991.

Her memory lives on in a number of plants named in her honor by colleagues in Israel and abroad, among them Astragalus feinbruniae (1970), Bellevalia feinbruniae (1970) and Colchicum feinbruniae (1992).
