= Michael Zohary =

Israeli botanist

- מיכאל זהרי
- Born: Michael Schein; May 9, 1898; Bóbrka, Austria-Hungary
- Died: May 16, 1983 (aged 85); Jerusalem
- Occupation: Botanist
- Awards: Weizmann Prize (1954)

Michael Zohary (Hebrew: מיכאל זהרי; born 9 April 1898 in Bóbrka, Galicia (Austria-Hungary); died 16 April 1983 in Jerusalem) was a pioneering Israeli botanist.

== Biography ==
Michael Schein (later Zohary) was born into a Jewish family in Bóbrka, near Lviv (then Austria-Hungarian Empire). He immigrated to the British Mandate for Palestine in 1920. After working building roads, he attended the Teacher's Seminary in Jerusalem. He published the monumental Geobotanical Foundations of the Middle East. He was responsible for introduction of the important principle of antiteleochory which adumbrated that seed germination of the desert plant is ensured by dispersal near the parent plant. His son, Daniel Zohary (1926–2006) was also a highly published botanist specializing in prehistoric plant domestication. His grandson, Ehud Zohary (1958 -present) is a neurobiologist. All three generations were/are faculty members at the same institute.

In 1931, Alexander Eig founded the National Botanic Garden of Israel on Mount Scopus, together with Michael Zohary and Naomi Feinbrun-Dothan.

In 1952 he was appointed professor of botany at the Hebrew University of Jerusalem.

As well as his interest in the plant geography and vegetation of Israel and Jordan, from 1950 to 1965 Zohary's research paid special attention to Turkey and Iran. He published The Plant Life of Israel in 1962 and a major article on the vegetation of Iran in the Israel Journal of Botany in 1964. His work on the Flora Palaestina resulted in the publication of the first two volumes, Pteridophyta (1966), and Dialypetalae (1972), meanwhile his major two-volume work, Geobotanical Foundations of the Middle East, appeared in 1973. Zohary's best known work, however, is A New Analytical Flora of Israel (1976, in Hebrew).

Zohary officially retired in 1967, but as Professor Emeritus continued his research, his final book being Plants of the Bible (1982). He died on 15 April 1983 in Jerusalem.

The plants Anthemis zoharyana Eig (1938), Bellevalia zoharyi Feinbrun (1939), and Stachys zoharyana Eig (1948), are all named after him.

== Awards ==
- In 1954, Zohary was awarded the Israel Prize, for life sciences.

== Works ==
- Zohary, Michael (1998). David Heller (ed.). A New Analytical Flora of Israel (in Hebrew) (2 ed.). Tel Aviv: Am Oved. OCLC 916628298. (published posthumously)
- "The Segetal Plants Communities of Palestine", in: Vegetatio 2 (1950), pp. 387–411.
- Flora Palaestina, I–II, Jerusalem 1966–1971.
- Plants of the Bible, Cambridge 1982.
- Domestication of Plants in the Old World (3rd edition), Oxford 2000.
- "The diffusion of South and East Asian and of African crops into the belt of Mediterranean agriculture", in: Plants for Food and Medicine (H.D.V. Prendergast, et al. editors), Royal Botanic Gardens, Kew 1998, pp. 123–134.

With Alexander Eig and Naomi Feinbrun-Dothan he organised the distribution of plant specimens from Israel in several exsiccata series. The first series issued in 1930 is entitled Flora exsiccata Palaestinae a sectione botanica Universitatis Hebraicae Hierosolymitanae edita.

== See also ==
- List of Israel Prize recipients
- List of Galician Jews
- List of people from Galicia (modern period)
